= Tekkno =

Studio album by Electric Callboy
- Released: 16 September 2022
- Genres: Metalcore; electropop; alternative rock; synth-pop; pop metal
- Length: 30:35
- Languages: English; German
- Label: Century Media
- Producers: Daniel "Danskimo" Haniß; Pascal Schillo; Kevin Ratajczak

Electric Callboy chronology
Rehab (2019)	Tekkno (2022)	Tanzneid (2026)

Singles from Tekkno
- 1. "We Got the Moves" Released: 3 September 2021; 2. "Pump It" Released: 3 December 2021; 3. "Spaceman" Released: 8 April 2022; 4. "Fckboi" Released: 8 July 2022; 5. "Hurrikan" Released: 19 August 2022

Tekkno is the sixth studio album by German Electronicore band Electric Callboy. The album was released on 16 September 2022 through Century Media Records. It is the band's first album to feature Nico Sallach as the band's clean vocalist and also their first since changing their name from Eskimo Callboy to Electric Callboy. It is likewise their last album with drummer David-Karl Friedrich, who left in April 2025.

== Background ==
On 22 December 2021, the band announced that they were removing old songs from all platforms due to offensive lyrics and that they would be changing their band name. On March 9, 2022, the band announced their new name, Electric Callboy. The band changed the word 'Eskimo' to 'Electric' because it can be seen as a derogatory name for the Inuit and Yupik people in Canada and Alaska. They subsequently re-released the artwork from their previous albums under the new name.

== Release and promotion ==
On 3 September 2021, the band released the lead single, "We Got the Moves". On 3 December 2021, the band released the second single, "Pump It". On 6 December 2021, the band submitted "Pump It" into the German national selection for the Eurovision Song Contest 2022, but ultimately were not included in the final list of participants. In December 2021, the band announced that they would be going on a United States tour with Attack Attack! from October to November 2022.

On 8 April 2022, the band released their first song under their new name, "Spaceman", featuring rapper Finch. On 15 April 2022, Electric Callboy announced Tekkno, which was released on 9 September 2022.

On 8 July 2022, the band released the fourth single, "Fckboi", with the American metalcore band Conquer Divide. On 19 August 2022, the band released the fifth single, "Hurrikan". The release date for the album was changed to 16 September 2022. In the following week, they had to postpone their UK/France Tour as well as cancelling their participation on the US Level-Up tour with Attack Attack! due to singer Nico Sallach having a jaw and middle ear infection. On 21 November 2022, the band released a music video for "Mindreader".

== Composition ==
Tekkno has been described as metalcore, electropop, alternative rock, synth-pop, and pop metal. Tuonela Magazine described the album as a "mash-up between Eurodance-inspired tunes and brutal djent-sprinkled riffs. According to Hysteria Mag, "Fckboi" leans into a pop punk sound, while utilizing alternative rock and trap elements. Nicholas Senior writing for New Noise Magazine, noted "house styles" on "Neon". "Mindreader" and "Parasite" mix the band's metalcore and rave sound. "Mindreader" opens with an "atmospheric trance/synth intro". The song "Hurrikan" starts off with German schlager and switches to deathcore.

== Reception ==
Professional ratings
Review scores
Source	Rating
Kerrang!	2/5
New Noise Magazine	4.5/5 stars
Sputnikmusic	3.8/5
Wall of Sound	7.5/10

Tekkno received generally positive reviews from critics. Nicholas Senior of New Noise Magazine stated, "Tekkno appropriately feels like a rebirth for the famed ravecore pioneers. A new name, a renewed sense of style, and clearly they were having as much fun as possible when making this." Writing for Sputnikmusic, Trey noted improvements this album made in comparison to the band's previous work, stating "Each album since Crystals had been increasingly bland and uninspired, while at the same time neutering the heavier elements of their past; Tekkno fixes all of that ... huge breakdowns, brilliant pop choruses, modern and old-school electro, metalcore riffs, and a large dose of escapist fun." Paul Brown was positive towards the album's mix of EDM and metal and called the album "wacky, unpredictable and...one of the funniest releases in recent years." Nick Ruskell of Kerrang! was less positive towards the different elements the band uses stating, "the disparate elements of the music are all so brightly coloured that often they refuse to mix...the novelty is stretched so far that it's hard to see past it."

== Commercial performance ==
Tekkno entered the German albums chart at No. 1 in the week after release, the highest ranking any record of Electric Callboy achieved. In October 2024, the album received Gold in Finland certifying 10.000 sold copies. In May 2025, Tekkno received Gold certification in Austria for 7,500 units being sold. During the bands own Escalation Fest 2026 the band announced that Tekkno had been certified Gold in Germany with 100,000 units sold.

== Track listing ==
All tracks are written by Daniel Haniß, Pascal Schillo, Kevin Ratajczak, Nico Sallach, except where noted.

No.	Title	Writer(s)	Length
1.	"Pump It"		2:53
2.	"We Got the Moves"		3:27
3.	"Fuckboi" (featuring Conquer Divide)	Haniß, Schillo, Ratajczak, Sallach, Conquer Divide	2:44
4.	"Spaceman" (featuring Finch)	Haniß, Schillo, Ratajczak, Sallach, Nils Wehowsky, Daniel Großmann, Matthias Mania	3:10
5.	"Mindreader"		3:45
6.	"Arrow of Love"		3:43
7.	"Parasite"		3:03
8.	"Tekkno Train"		2:58
9.	"Hurrikan"		1:40
10.	"Neon"		3:12
Total length:			30:35

== Personnel ==
Electric Callboy

- Kevin Ratajczak – vocals, keyboards, production
- Nico Sallach – vocals
- Daniel Haniss – guitar, production, mixing
- Pascal Schillo – guitar, production
- Daniel Klossek – bass guitar, backing vocals
- David Friedrich – drums

Guests

- Conquer Divide – "Fuckboi"
- Finch – "Spaceman"

Additional personnel

- Conquer Divide – production ("Fuckboi")
- Daniel Großmann – production ("Spaceman")
- Christoph Wieczorek – mastering

== Charts ==
=== Weekly charts ===
Weekly chart performance for Tekkno
Chart (2022)	Peak position
Australian Albums (ARIA)	66
Austrian Albums (Ö3 Austria)	3
Belgian Albums (Ultratop Flanders)	9
Belgian Albums (Ultratop Wallonia)	123
Dutch Albums (Album Top 100)	27
Finnish Albums (Suomen virallinen lista)	13
German Albums (Offizielle Top 100)	1
Scottish Albums (Official Charts)	44
Swiss Albums (Schweizer Hitparade)	6
UK Album Downloads (Official Charts)	9
UK Albums Sales (OCC)	30
UK Physical Albums (OCC)	42
UK Rock & Metal Albums (Official Charts)	4

=== Year-end charts ===
Year-end chart performance for Tekkno
Chart (2022)	Position
German Albums (Offizielle Top 100)	49

== Certifications ==
Certifications for Tekkno
Region	Certification	Certified units/sales
Austria (IFPI Austria)	Gold	7,500^{‡}
Finland (Musiikkituottajat)	Gold	10,000
Germany (BVMI)	Gold	100,000^{‡}
^{‡} Sales+streaming figures based on certification alone.
