= Hypa Hypa =

Single by Electric Callboy

from the album MMXX
- Released: June 19, 2020
- Genre: Electronicore
- Length: 3:33
- Label: Century Media
- Composers: Daniel Haniß; Kevin Ratajczak; Nico Sallach; Pascal Schillo
- Producers: Daniel Haniß; Kevin Ratajczak; Pascal Schillo

Electric Callboy singles chronology
"Prism" (2019)	"Hypa Hypa" (2020)	"Hate/Love" (2020)

Music video
- "Hypa Hypa" on YouTube

"Hypa Hypa" is a song by German Electronicore band Electric Callboy (formerly Eskimo Callboy). The track is the first single from their second EP MMXX. The track gained notoriety in 2021 through its various reissues that the band released in collaboration with other musicians. The song reached number 77 on the German charts.

== Genesis and artwork ==
The song was written by the band members Daniel Haniß, Kevin Ratajczak, Nico Sallach and Pascal Schillo. Recording and production resulted from the collaboration between Haniß, Ratajczak and Schillo. Haniß was also responsible for mixing the piece himself. The mastering was done by Pitchback Studio, under the direction of the owner Aljoscha Seig.

A screenshot from the accompanying music video can be seen on the front cover of the single. It shows the band in a 1980s style, in front of a convertible, four palm trees and a bright neon pink sun. The artist and song information consists of the inscription: 'Eskimo Callboy starring in Hypa Hypa'. The information is centred at the top of the cover image. Matthias Lowesnstein from Season Zero was responsible for the artwork. The concept came from the band itself. The cover image was first presented on 4 June 2020.

== Publishing and promotion ==
Hypa Hypa was initially released as a single on 18 June 2020. The single was released as a digital download through the music label Century Media. It was distributed by Sony Music Publishing. On 11 September 2020, the song was released as part of Electric Callboy's second EP MMXX. In the first half of 2021, the band re-recorded the song with some guest vocalists. Some of these new recordings were released in April and May 2021 as singles and some were released as music videos. All singles, like the main track, were released as digital downloads and streaming. The first remix featured the medieval rock band Saltatio Mortis on 30 April 2021. It was followed by a feature from pop singer, Sasha on 7 May 2021. The hip-hop duo 257ers on 14 May 2021. The DJ duo GeStort aber GeiL, the metal singer Axel One, the metalcore band We Butter the Bread with Butter and the country band The BossHoss on 20 May 2021. On 21 May 2021, a new edition of the MMXX album was released called: 'Hypa Hypa edition'. This extended EP includes all the new remixes, as well as the unreleased featuring with guitarist Tobias Rauscher.

To promote the song, the band performed at Wacken World Wide 2020, among other music festivals.

== Background information ==
Hypa Hypa is the first release from Electric Callboy to feature the new front man Nico Sallach, who was previously the lead singer of trancecore band To the Rats and Wolves. He replaced Sebastian 'Sushi' Biesler, who had left the band after ten years. Biesler announced his departure on 12 February 2020. After leaving the band, he formed Ghostkid.

== Content ==
The lyrics to Hypa Hypa are in English and a reference to Hyper Hyper by Scooter. The term 'hypa' is a corruption of 'hyper' which comes from the Greek and can be translated as 'mega', 'super' or 'over'. The music and lyrics were originally written and composed by Electric Callboy members Danierl Haniß, Kevin Ratajcak, Nico Sallach and Pascal Schillo. The version with the 257ers contains lyrics in German, and only the chorus was taken over in the original. The two members of the 257ers, Mike Rohleder and Daniel Schneider appear as additional authors. Musically, the song moves in the field of metalcore. The tempo is 76 beats per minute and the key is G-sharp minor.

== Music video ==
The music video was shot in Castrop-Rauxel and premiered on YouTube on 19 June 2020. A first teaser was presented on 4 June 2020, when Sallach was officially confirmed as the new lead singer. During the shooting, the band received support from influencers such as _alienxbaby_ or HandOfBlood. The video was shot in the style of the 1980s and uses stylistic devices such as Hawaiian shirts, neon colours or a mullet-Hairstyle. It can be divided into three scenes. First, you see the band playing the song. On the other hand you see _alienxbaby_, who plays with things in an ambiguous way or poses lasciviously in front of a Ferrari convertible. Another scene shows the other influencers dancing to the song. The total length of the video is 3:31 minutes. The Schillo brothers Oliver and Pascal, who also directed VIP and Prism, directed the film. The music video has over 52 million views on YouTube to date (as of March 29, 2026).

In addition, music videos for the versions with Sasha (7 May 2021), 257ers (14 May 2021), We Butter the Bread with Butter (21 May 2021) and Axel One (25 May 2021) have also been released, leading to the for the most part also take up the stylistic devices of the 1980s. Ratajczak and Sallach have guest appearances in all videos; _alienxbaby_ also appears in the videos of the 257ers and Sasha.

== Success ==
Approx. one year after its initial release, Hypa Hypa managed to enter the German single charts at 77 on 28 May 2021. It is the first song by Electric Callboy achieving a chart entry overall. Before that, Hypa Hypa charted in the German single trends charts, reaching no. 1 on 16 June 2020 which indicated that an entry in the official single charts was missed barely.

During the COVID-19 pandemic lockdown of 2020–21, Electric Callboy released 7 more versions of Hypa Hypa to much fanfare. These included covers by and features with Sasha, The BossHoss, 257ers, Axel One, We Butter The Bread With Butter, Saltatio Mortis and Gestort aber GeiL. These were released as a part of the MMXX "Hypa Hypa Edition".

In February 2023, Hypa Hypa was certified Gold in Germany for selling 200.000 copies of the single. In November the same year, the song received Gold in Austria for certified 15.000 copies sold. In August 2024, the song was certified Gold in Switzerland.

== Credits ==
=== Song production ===
- David Friedrich: drums
- Daniel Haniß: mixdown, guitar, composer, songwriter, sound engineer
- Daniel Klossek: bass
- Kevin Ratajczak: vocals, keyboards, composer, songwriter, sound engineer
- Nico Sallach: vocals, composer, lyricist
- Pascal Schillo: guitar, composer, songwriter, sound engineer
- Aljoscha Sieg: mastering

=== Company ===
- Century Media: music label
- Life Lines Edition: publisher
- Melodies of the World: publisher
- Sony Music Publishing: distribution

=== Cover design ===
- Matthias Lowenstein: artwork

== Charts ==
Chart performance for "Hypa Hypa"
Chart (2021)	Peak position
Germany (Official German Charts)	77

== Certifications ==
Certifications and sales for "Hypa Hypa"
Region	Certification	Certified units/sales
Austria (IFPI Austria)	Gold	15,000^{‡}
Germany (BVMI)	Gold	200,000^{‡}
Switzerland (IFPI Switzerland)	Gold	10,000^{‡}
^{‡} Sales+streaming figures based on certification alone.
