= God Save the Rave =

Studio album by Scooter
- Released: 16 April 2021
- Recorded: 2019–2020
- Studios: Sheffield Underground (Hamburg, Germany)
- Length: 52:17
- Labels: Sheffield Tunes; Kontor
- Producer: Scooter

Scooter chronology
100% Scooter – 25 Years Wild & Wicked (2017)	God Save the Rave (2021)	Open Your Mind and Your Trousers (2024)

Singles from God Save the Rave
- 1. "Rave Teacher (Somebody Like Me)" Released: 5 April 2019; 2. "God Save the Rave" Released: 31 May 2019; 3. "Devil's Symphony" Released: 11 October 2019; 4. "Which Light Switch is Which?" Released: 13 December 2019; 5. "Bassdrum" Released: 5 June 2020; 6. "FCK 2020" Released: 23 October 2020; 7. "Paul is Dead" Released: 27 November 2020; 8. "We Love Hardcore" Released: 19 March 2021; 9. "Groundhog Day" Released: 16 April 2021

Professional ratings
Review scores
Source	Rating
Laut.de	4/5 stars
Mix1	7/8
Plattentests.de	1/10

God Save the Rave is the twentieth studio album by German band Scooter, released on 16 April 2021 through Sheffield Tunes and Kontor Records. It is the first Scooter album not to be released after the usual one year-two year gap, being released almost four years after 2017's Scooter Forever. It is also the first and only studio album featuring Sebastian Schilde, who replaced Phil Speiser in 2019 and then departed from the band in December 2022, and the final studio album featuring Michael Simon who also left in December 2022 after being with the band since 2006.

== Background ==
In April 2019, Scooter officially announced their new member Sebastian Schilde would be replacing Phil Speiser, after Speiser had been with the group since 2014. Their twentieth album was set to be released in the winter of 2020. It would be titled God Save the Rave and include 15 tracks. The album's tour, "The God Save the Rave tour" was originally expected to go ahead in the summer of 2020, but was postponed due to the COVID-19 pandemic. In December 2020, the album release date was postponed to 16 April 2021 due to the renewed lockdown.

== Track listing ==
All lyrics are written by H.P. Baxxter, except "Bassdrum" lyrics by H.P. Baxxter and Finch Asozial.

CD 1: God Save the Rave
No.	Title	Writer(s)	Length
1.	"Futurum est Nostrum"	H.P. Baxxter; Sebastian Schilde; Michael Simon; Jens Thele	1:48
2.	"God Save the Rave" (with Harris & Ford)	Baxxter; Schilde; Simon; Thele; Patrick Poehl; Kevin Kridlo; Vanessa Schulz	3:12
3.	"Never Stop the Show"	Baxxter; Schilde; Simon; Thele; Diandra Faye; Mijke Breepoel	3:51
4.	"We Love Hardcore" (with Dimitri Vegas and Like Mike)	Baxxter; Thele; Simon; Schilde; Michael Karl Thivaios; Dimitri Thivaios; Fabian Bohn; Elie Abwi; Florian Senfter; Emanuel Guenther	3:15
5.	"Paul is Dead" (with Timmy Trumpet)	Baxxter; Schilde; Simon; Thele; Timothy Jude Smith; Jeremy Bunawan; Leonie Burger	2:55
6.	"Bassdrum" (with Finch Asozial)	Baxxter; Schilde; Simon; Thele; Nils Wehowsky; Matthias Mania; Daniel Großmann; Schulz	2:55
7.	"Which Light Switch is Which?"	Baxxter; Schilde; Simon; Thele; Poehl; Kridlo; Christin Pohl; Vincent Oostlander; Marco Marinus J.A.C.M. Verkuylen	3:22
8.	"FCK 2020"	Baxxter; Schilde; Simon; Thele; Schulz	3:29
9.	"Groundhog Day"	Baxxter; Schilde; Simon; Thele; Burger; Vitali Zestovskih	2:53
10.	"Hang the DJ"	Baxxter; Schilde; Simon; Thele	3:16
11.	"Rave Teacher (Somebody Like Me)" (with Xillions)	Baxxter; Schilde; Thele; Mark Carpentier; Shea Duncan; Oscar Bishop	3:17
12.	"Анастасия"	Baxxter; Schilde; Simon; Thele	6:57
13.	"Devil's Symphony"	Baxxter; Schilde; Simon; Thele; Pohel; Kridlo; Charlotte Boss	3:05
14.	"These Days"	Baxxter; Schilde; Simon; Thele	4:03
15.	"Wand'rin' Star"	Frederick Lowe; Alan Jay Lerner	3:59
Total length:			52:17

CD 2: I Want You to Stream!
No.	Title	Length
1.	"Intro"	1:24
2.	"One (Always Hardcore)"	4:15
3.	"The Logical Song"	4:49
4.	"Bora! Bora! Bora!"	3:50
5.	"My Gabber" (with Jebroer)	3:47
6.	"God Save the Rave" (with Harris & Ford)	4:49
7.	"Fire"	4:36
8.	"How Much is the Fish?"	3:52
9.	"The Age of Love (Live Version)"	2:30
10.	"Fuck the Millennium/Call Me Mañana"	5:39
11.	"J'adore Hardcore/Jumping All Over the World"	7:59
12.	"Maria (I Like It Loud)"	5:01
13.	"Which Light Switch is Which?"	4:29
14.	"Endless Summer/Hyper Hyper/Move Your Ass! (Noisecontrollers Remix)"	7:41
Total length:		64:41

Notes

- The police car from the "Rave Teacher (Somebody Like Me)" music video is a reference to the Ford Timelord car used by the KLF in the "Doctorin' The Tardis" music video and the road movie The White Room. This is not the first reference to Ford Timelord by Scooter, who used this reference in the 2000 "I'm Your Pusher" music video.
- "Rave Teacher (Somebody Like Me)" differs from its single version, going for a more hardstyle approach in the album version, as opposed to the single version's hands up sound.
- "Анастасия" is pronounced Anastasia.
- On the vinyl edition of the album, the track "Wand'rin' Star" is replaced by "Lugosi".

Sample credits

- "We Love Hardcore" contains samples of the 1999 song "Kernkraft 400" by Zombie Nation.
- "Which Light Switch is Which?" contains samples of the 1995 song "Strings of Infinity" by T-Marc featuring Vincent.
- "FCK 2020" contains samples of the 2003 song "Pump It Loud" by the Pitcher.
- "Hang the DJ" contains samples of the 1993 song "Konvulsionslaten" by Anders Norudde.
- "Rave Teacher (Somebody Like Me)" contains an interpolation of the Mark With A K remix of the 2017 song "Somebody Like Me" as performed by Xillions.
- "Devil's Symphony" contains samples of Swan Lake Act 2, Scene 10 Moderato by Pjotr Iljitsch Tschaikowski.
- "These Days" contains samples of the 2015 song "Iyéwaye" by Oliver Koletzki.
- "Wand'rin' Star" is a cover version of the 1951 song of the same name. The idea of making this song is probably one of many ideas that Scooter borrowed from The KLF. The song "Build A Fire" from The KLF's album The White Room contains the text: "We'll stop for lunch in some taco bar. Lee Marvin on the jukebox, "Wand'rin' Star".

== Charts ==
Chart performance for God Save the Rave
Chart (2021)	Peak position
Austrian Albums (Ö3 Austria)	7
Belgian Albums (Ultratop Wallonia)	159
German Albums (Offizielle Top 100)	4
Hungarian Albums (MAHASZ)	22
Slovak Albums (ČNS IFPI)	91
Swiss Albums (Schweizer Hitparade)	12
UK Dance Albums (Official Charts)	2
