= God Save the Rave (song) =

2019 single

Single by Scooter and Harris & Ford

from the album God Save the Rave
- Released: 20 June 2019
- Studio: Sheffield Underground Studios
- Length: 3:12
- Label: Sheffield Tunes
- Composers: H.P. Baxxter; Kevin Kridlo; Patrick Pöhl; Sebastian Schilde; Michael Simon; Jens Thiele; Vanessa Ulmer
- Producers: Scooter; Harris & Ford

Scooter singles chronology
"Rave Teacher (Somebody Like Me)" (2019)	"God Save the Rave" (2019)	"Devils Symphony" (2019)

God Save the Rave is a single by German hard dance band Scooter and Austrian disc jockey duo Harris & Ford, it was the first single from Scooter's twentieth studio album with the same name.

On download, the song was featured with previous single Rave Teacher (Someone Like Me) with Xillions.

== Track listing ==
=== Digital download ===
1. "God Save the Rave" — 3:12
2. "Rave Teacher (Somebody Like Me)" — 3:15

=== Extended mix ===
1. "God Save the Rave (Extended Mix)" — 5:08

== Chart performance ==
Chart (2019)	Peak position
Hungary (MAHASZ)	2

== Certifications ==
Region	Certification	Certified units/sales
Germany (BVMI)	Gold	300.00^
Austria (IFPI)	Gold	15.000^
^{^} Shipments figures based on certification alone.
