= Harris & Ford =

Austrian electronic music duo

Harris & Ford are an Austrian DJ duo consisting of the two DJs, music producers and songwriters Kevin Kridlo and Patrick Pöhl.

== History ==
The band was formed in January 2011.

Legendär, Das geht Boom and Tick Tack were the first musical successes of the duo. All three songs were able to place themselves in the official Austrian charts. Das Geht Boom stayed in the single charts for eight weeks and also reached number one in the DJ Charts Austria.

While their productions were initially classified as pop dance, their current productions and releases can be classified as hardstyle, psytrance and big room. Harris & Ford have been under a contract with Kontor Records since early 2019.

In May 2019 they reached number 88 in the official German single sales charts with their song Freitag Samstag (feat. Finch Asozial). As a result, various international collaborations emerged. Also in May 2019, they released a single God Save the Rave along with Scooter. The single, Break the Beat followed in September, with the Italian DJ/producer team VINAI. In November 2019, they released an official remix of the Scooter single Devil's Symphony. In December, they released a remix of the track Hardstyle Girl from the project 'Hard But Crazy'. The remix peaked at number one on the Beatport Hard Dance.

In January 2020, they released the song Mutter together with the Dutch rapper Jebroer. The title is based on the Berlin Gassenhaur Mutter, der Mann mit dem Koks ist da from the late 19th century. In March 2020, Fight Back, together with Ummet Ozcan was released through Spinnin' Records. In April 2020, Harris & Ford, along with Norwegian DJ and producer team Da Tweekaz, released a new remix version of the song Moscow by Dschinghis Kahn. The song premiered at the World Cup Dome Winter Edition in Düsseldorf in January 2020. Another remix, He's a Pirate, was released in April 2020. In May 2020, the song Spotlight was released together with Dutch DJ and producer Sander van Doorn on Spinnin' Records. In May 2020, the single True Friendship was released.

== Discography ==
=== Singles ===
- 2011: Your show
- 2012: I feel like it
- 2012: Legendary
- 2013: That Goes Boom (Shag Ragga) (vs. Gordon & Doyle feat. Lisah)
- 2014: Tick Tock (feat. Lisah)
- 2015: Great! (feat. Trackshittaz)
- 2015: We Need Mood (feat. Vanny)
- 2016: Eurotrip (with Anna Chiara)
- 2016: If Not Now, When (vs. Powerkryner)
- 2017: Born to Party (with Marry)
- 2017: Forever and Now (Club Mix) (with Julia Buchler)
- 2017: Up & Down (The Fit Program)
- 2017: 96 Hours Awake (feat. Jöli)
- 2018: Forever young
- 2018: Live is Life (feat. Ena)
- 2018: A day of infinity
- 2018: Hard, Style & Folk Music (feat. Addnfahrer; AT:)
- 2019: We are the party (with Isi Glück)
- 2019: Drop Me Amadeus
- 2019: Friday Saturday (with Finch; AT:)
- 2019: God Save the Rave (with Scooter; AT:)
- 2019: Break the Beat (with Vinai)
- 2020: Mother (with Jebroer)
- 2020: Fight Back (with Ummet Ozcan)
- 2020: Moscow (with Da Tweekaz)
- 2020: Spotlight (with Sander van Doorn)
- 2020: True Friendship
- 2020: Neighbors (with Finch)
- 2020: Rocketship (with Da Hool)
- 2020: Addicted to the Bass (with Brennan Heart)
- 2020: My Way (with Mike Candys)
- 2020: Higher Space (with Jerome)
- 2021: The Master (with Jebroer)
- 2021: Bye Bye (with Neptunica)
- 2021: Lost in you (with Maxim Schunk)
- 2021: Coco Jambo (with HBz & Thovi)
- 2021: Running (with Klaas)
- 2021: Everlasting (with Nooma)
- 2021: Million Dreams (with Ummet Ozcan)
- 2021: Circus (with Amber Van Day)
- 2021: Madhouse (with Outsiders)
- 2021: I Wouldn't Know (with Molow)
- 2021: Bassman (with Blasterjaxx)
- 2021: Jeanny (with Ian Storm & SilkandStones)
- 2021: Checkmate (with Maxim Schuck & Hard But Crazy)
- 2021: Dreams (with Axmo feat. Sarah de Waaren)
- 2021: Never Let Me Go (with Timmy Trumpet & Cascada)
- 2021: Neon Lights (with Lizot)
- 2021: Your Mama (with Glass Bead Game)
- 2021: Survivors
- 2022: The Sound (with Robert Falcon feat. JUSTN X)
- 2022: Alive (with Madugo)
- 2022: Numb (with DJ Gollum)
- 2022: Never Alone (with Hard But Crazy)
- 2022: Hollywood (with Faustix feat. PollyAnna)
- 2022: Amsterdam (with 2 Angels & Charlie)
- 2022: Psycho (with Bassjackers feat. Rebecca Helena)
- 2022: Turn Back Time
- 2022: Raindrop (with Marnik feat. Shibui)
- 2022: Make The World Rave Again (with Finch)
- 2022: Come with Me (with W&W & Special D.)
- 2022: Died in Your Arms (Reloaded) (with Sound Rush)
- 2022: Halo (with Prezioso feat. Shibui)
- 2022: "Weekend Party" (with ItaloBrothers)
- 2022: I’ve got hungry eyes (with Mark Star & Chris Thor)
- 2023: Fantasy (Tricky Disco) (with W&W & Triiipl 3)
- 2023: Techno is Back (with Scooter)

=== Remixes ===
- 2011: C-Nattix - Love
- 2011: Sunset Project & Tomtrax - Nessaiah
- 2012: Mike Indigo- Bam Baram
- 2012: Royal XTC feat. Molti- Hello
- 2013: DualXess & Nico Provenzano feat. Charlee - Ladies Night
- 2013: Gordon & Doyle - Raise Your Memory
- 2013: Funky Control - Freaky Boys
- 2013: DJ East Curve feat. Big Daddi, Kane & Enzo - Ti amo 2k13
- 2013: Club Raiders - Get Away
- 2013: Flava & Stevenson feat. Cesca Lara - Love a Paris
- 2013: Peter Sax- Pool Party
- 2013: Action in the ear - it doesn't matter
- 2013: Tomtrax— Mono 2 Stereo
- 2013: Seaside Clubbers - Don't Forget
- 2014: Trackshittaz - Awesome!
- 2014: Pressure Unit feat. Young Sixx - Let's Go Wild
- 2016: Andreas Gabalier – Hulapalu
- 2016: Vanessa Mai - I die for you
- 2016: Kerstin Ott - Little Rocket
- 2017: Lorenz Buffalo – Johnny Däpp
- 2017: Nockalm Quintet – In the night
- 2017: Helene Fischer – only with you
- 2017: Marco Wagner & Dave Brown – Hey Bro
- 2017: Peter Wackel – I'm selling my body
- 2017: Peter Power & Powerkryner - Left Right - Jump!
- 2018: Isi Glück - Life is a party
- 2018: Almklausi & Specktakel - Mama Laudaaa
- 2018: Andreas Gabalier – Hello
- 2018: The doctors - cry for love
- 2019: Miranda – Vamos ala Playa
- 2019: Scooter - Devil's Symphony
- 2019: Hard But Crazy - Hardstyle Girl
- 2020: Scotty - He's a Pirate
- 2021: Captain X- Wellerman
- 2021: Maxim Schunk & Noisetime – Perfect Match
- 2021: Emi Flemming – Don't Worry (Get Yourself A Hobby)
- 2021: Jebroer - Blood Mary
- 2021: Electric Callboy - Pump It
- 2021: Yves V & CORSAK feat. Leony - Where Do You Think You Are Going
- 2021: NoooN & Kati Breuer - Nuts are healthy
- 2022: Alexander Eder – 7 hours
- 2022: Julian Sommer - Tight in the plane
- 2022: 2 Angels & Charlie – Goethe
- 2022: Tream – BMW 3 Series
- 2022: The Zipfelbuben – Olivia
- 2022: Nathan Evans - Drunken Sailor
- 2022: Nena - 99 Luftballons
