= Groundhog Day (disambiguation) =

Groundhog Day is a holiday celebrated on February 2 in the United States and Canada.

Groundhog Day may also refer to:

- "Groundhog Day", a song by Melanie Safka from her 1976 album Photograph
- Groundhog Day (film)
  - Groundhog Day (musical), a 2016 musical based on the film
- "The Groundhog Day", an episode of The O.C.
- "Groundhog Day", a song by Eminem from the deluxe edition of The Marshall Mathers LP 2
- "Groundhog Day", a song by Drag-On from Opposite of H2O
- "Groundhog Day", a song by Em Beihold
- "Groundhog Day", a song by Scooter from God Save the Rave
- "Groundhog's Day", a song by Primus from Frizzle Fry

== See also ==
- Groundhog (disambiguation)
