= Conquer Divide (album) =

Studio album by Conquer Divide
- Released: July 24, 2015
- Recorded: 2013–2015
- Studio: The Foundation Estate
- Genre: Metalcore; post-hardcore
- Length: 44:21
- Label: Artery
- Producer: Joey Sturgis

Conquer Divide chronology
Conquer Divide (2015)	Slow Burn (2023)

Singles from Conquer Divide
- 1. "Sink Your Teeth Into This" Released: June 16, 2015; 2. "Nightmares" Released: July 29, 2015; 3. "What's Left Inside" Released: May 24, 2016; 4. "Eyes Wide Shut (acoustic)" Released: September 11, 2016 (Japan exclusive)

Conquer Divide is the debut self-titled album by American rock band Conquer Divide. It was released on July 24, 2015, by Artery Recordings.

== Critical reception ==
Professional ratings
Review scores
Source	Rating
New Transcendence	9/10 stars
Sputnikmusic	3/5 stars

Natasha Van Duser of New Noise Magazine wrote, "Conquer Divide nail the unclean verse/clean chorus formula right on the head. It’s a tried and true method, but a method we have all seen a dozen and one times".

New Transcendence Magazine wrote, "Lyrically and musically this album is full of things to love. If you enjoy fast-paced metal with killer female vocalists (such as Kittie) you will definitely find this enjoyable. What’s more is that these gals bring these songs to life in a way you wouldn’t imagine live! Such charisma and energy… go catch them at a show"

Sputnikmusic wrote, "Between solid songwriting and playing to their strengths, the band manages to pull out an engaging debut where a lot of their contemporaries haven’t."

== Track listing ==
All tracks are written by Conquer Divide and produced by Joey Sturgis, except where noted.

Conquer Divide track listing
No.	Title	Writer(s)	Length
1.	"Sink Your Teeth Into This" (featuring Denis Stoff)	Conquer Divide; Denis Stoff	3:20
2.	"Self Destruct"	Conquer Divide	4:00
3.	"Eyes Wide Shut"	Conquer Divide	3:49
4.	"Nightmares"	Conquer Divide; Steve Aiello	5:52
5.	"Lost"	Conquer Divide; Andrew Oliver	3:49
6.	"What's Left Inside"	Kristen Sturgis; Joey Sturgis	4:33
7.	"At War"	Conquer Divide	4:03
8.	"Despicable You"	Conquer Divide	4:10
9.	"Heavy Lies the Crown"	Conquer Divide	4:11
10.	"Broken"	Conquer Divide; Andy Loy; Michael Neal	7:05
Total length:			44:21

Japanese bonus track
No.	Title	Length
11.	"Eyes Wide Shut" (acoustic)	4:06

== Personnel ==
Credits adapted from AllMusic.

Conquer Divide

- Kiarely Castillo – clean vocals
- Janel Duarte – unclean vocals, additional clean vocals
- Kristen Sturgis – rhythm guitar, bass
- Isabel "Izzy" Johnson – lead guitar
- Sarah Stonebraker – bass (credited but does not perform)
- Tamara Tadic – drums

Additional musicians

- Denis Stoff – guest vocals (track 1)
- Michael Neal – piano outro (track 10)

Additional personnel

- Joey Sturgis – producer, engineer, mastering, mixing
- Chuck Alkazian – drum engineer
- Nick Scott – engineering and editing

== Charts ==
Chart performance for Conquer Divide
Chart (2015)	Peak position
US Top Heatseekers (Billboard)	8
US Hard Rock Albums (Billboard)	23
