= Slow Burn (Conquer Divide album) =

Studio album by Conquer Divide
- Released: September 8, 2023
- Recorded: 2021–2023
- Studio: Big Sky Recording (Ann Arbor, Michigan)
- Genre: Alternative metal; metalcore
- Length: 51:15
- Label: Mascot
- Producer: Joey Sturgis

Conquer Divide chronology
Conquer Divide (2015)	Slow Burn (2023)

Singles from Slow Burn
- 1. "Atonement" Released: March 28, 2022; 2. "Paralyzed" Released: October 26, 2022; 3. "Welcome2paradise" Released: May 11, 2023; 4. "The Invisible" Released: June 15, 2023; 5. "New Heaven" Released: July 27, 2023

Slow Burn is the second studio album by American rock band Conquer Divide. The album was released on September 8, 2023, through Mascot Records. This is the first album to feature drummer Samantha Landa and last album to feature unclean vocalist and bassist Janel Duarte.

== Overview ==
Prior to the signing, the band began recording for the second album. In March 2022, the band was signed to Mascot Records. Following the band's signing with the label, the first single, "Atonement" was released on March 28, 2022. The second single, "Paralyzed" was released on October 26, 2022. On May 11, 2023, the third single, "welcome2paradise" was released. The album title and the tracklist was unveiled on the same day through their social media accounts.

== Themes and composition ==
Critics described the album as metalcore, alternative rock, and hard rock.

The album contains themes ranging from mental illness and depression to the environment. The song "Paralyzed" contains "battling with mental illness and depression — especially during the pandemic—and feeling like you are too mentally paralyzed to move forward.", as stated by guitarist Kristen Sturgis. Rocksound Magazine stated the song was "designed for arenas" and a "monster" (of a track), while Metalhammer Magazine stated "Conquer Divide are showing off their own capability for massive earworms with the ultra-addictive Paralyzed... the true MVP of Paralyzed is the absolutely enormous chorus".

== Track listing ==
All tracks are written by Conquer Divide and produced by Joey Sturgis, except where noted.

Slow Burn track listing
No.	Title	Writer(s)	Length
1.	"Atonement"	Conquer Divide	3:57
2.	"New Heaven"	Conquer Divide; Johnny Andrews	3:18
3.	"Paralyzed"	Conquer Divide	3:45
4.	"Welcome2paradise"	Conquer Divide	4:46
5.	"Pressure"	Conquer Divide; Tyler Smyth	3:44
6.	"System_failure"	Conquer Divide	4:18
7.	"Playing w/ Fire"	Conquer Divide	3:36
8.	"Over It."	Conquer Divide; Marshall Altman	3:36
9.	"Afterthought.wav"	Conquer Divide	3:53
10.	"The Invisible"	Conquer Divide; Andrews	3:42
11.	"Wide Awake"	Conquer Divide; Erik Ron	3:36
12.	"OnlyGirl"	Conquer Divide	3:52
13.	"Gatekeeper"	Conquer Divide	5:07
Total length:			51:15

Slow Burn (Deluxe Edition)
No.	Title	Writer(s)	Length
14.	"Paralyzed" (featuring Chris Parketny of Attack Attack!)	Conquer Divide	3:32
15.	"Bad Guy" (Sirius XM Octane Next Wave Concert Series Version)	Billie Eilish; Finneas O'Connell	3:11
16.	"Atonement" (Sirius XM Octane Next Wave Concert Series Version)	Conquer Divide	3:58
17.	"Paralyzed" (Sirius XM Octane Next Wave Concert Series Version)	Conquer Divide	3:46
18.	"OnlyGirl" (Acoustic)	Conquer Divide	3:50
19.	"80 Proof"	Kiarely Castillo	3:25
Total length:			72:57

== Personnel ==
Conquer Divide

- Kiarely Castillo – clean vocals
- Janel Duarte – unclean vocals, bass, backing clean vocals
- Kristen Sturgis – rhythm guitar, additional vocals (track 4)
- Isabel "Izzy" Johnson – lead guitar, additional vocals (track 2)
- Samantha Landa – drums

Additional musicians

- EunYoung Lee – piano
- Chris Parketny (of Attack Attack!) – guest vocals (track 14, Deluxe Edition only)

Additional personnel

- Joey Sturgis – producer, executive producer, engineer, mastering, mixing
- Nick Matzkows – engineering
- Jon Eberhard – additional engineering
- Bailey Zindel – artwork

== Charts ==
Chart performance for Slow Burn
Chart (2023)	Peak position
UK Rock & Metal Albums (OCC)	39
US Top Hard Rock Albums (Billboard)	8
US Top Rock Albums (Billboard)	18
