= Nico Sallach =

German singer (born 1990)

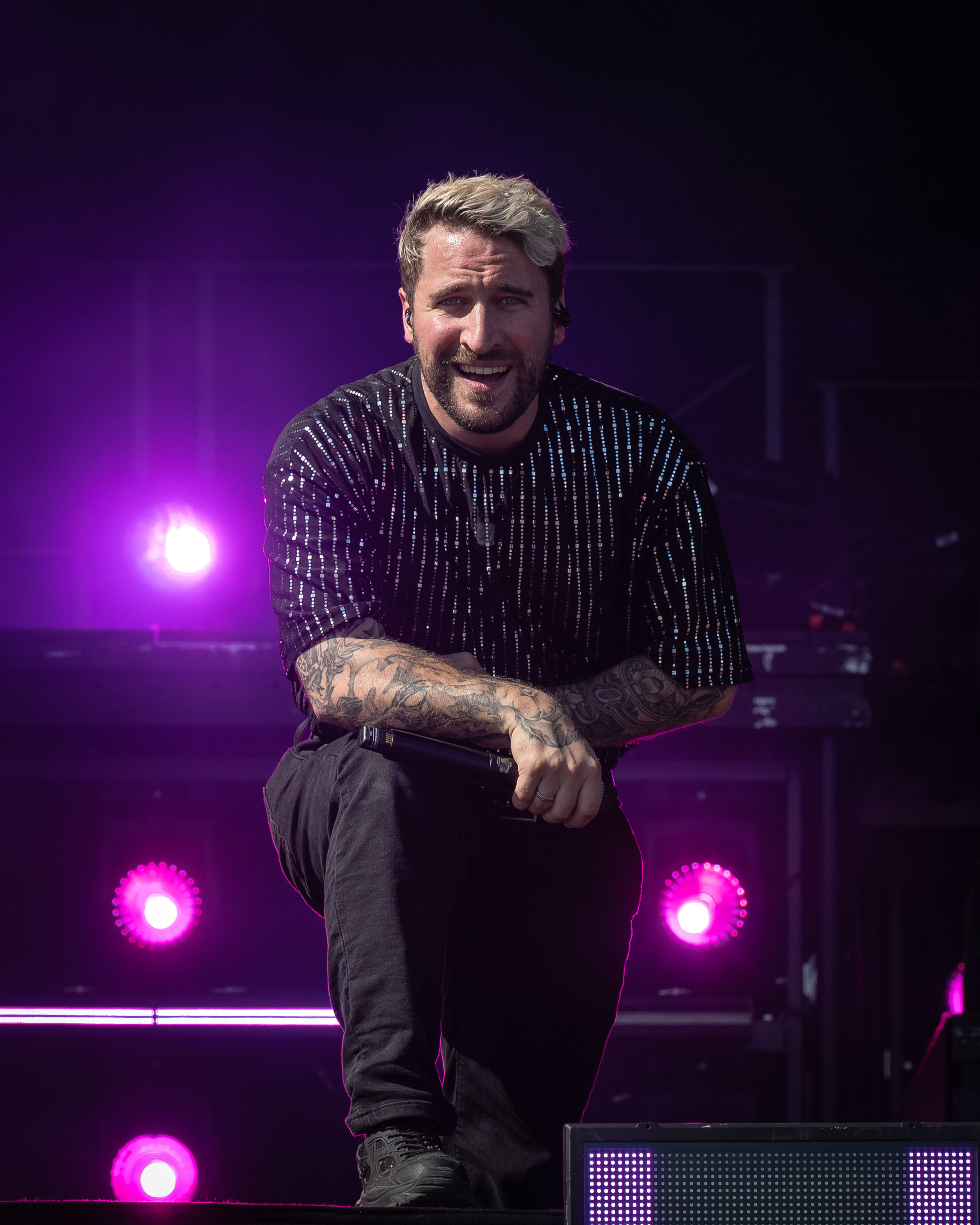
- Sallach performing in 2025

Background information
- Born: 31 May 1990 (age 36); Essen, Germany
- Genres: Electronicore; metalcore; post-hardcore; EDM
- Occupations: Singer; songwriter
- Member of: Electric Callboy
- Formerly of: To the Rats and Wolves

Nico Sallach (born 31 May 1990) is a German singer. He first became known as a founding member and the co-lead vocalist of To the Rats and Wolves, which formed in 2012 and disbanded in 2020. He gained wider prominence in 2020 when he joined Electric Callboy as its "clean" vocalist and lyricist, alongside "unclean" vocalist Kevin Ratajczak.

== Early life ==
Sallach was born in Essen on 31 May 1990. He has two younger brothers. His singing career started when he was in a school band. Before he was able to make his music career a full-time commitment, he worked as a qualified gerontological nurse, specialising in extra-clinical ventilation with a focus on patients suffering from amyotrophic lateral sclerosis and multiple sclerosis.

== Career ==
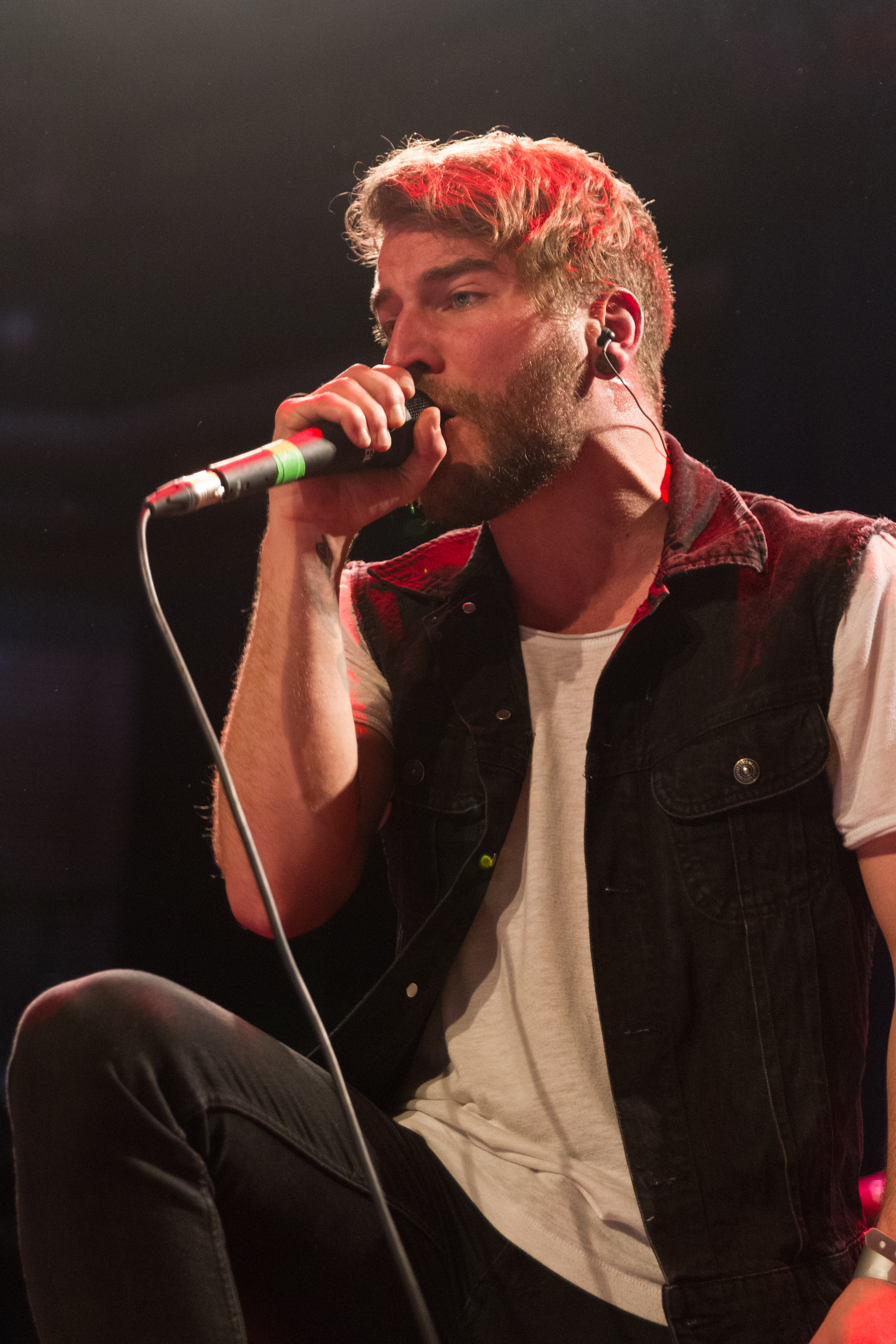
Sallach with To the Rats and Wolves in 2015

In 2009, Sallach was the frontman for Through Your Veins. In 2012, he became a founding member and the "clean" vocalist of To the Rats and Wolves alongside "unclean" vocalist Dixi Wu, guitarists Danny Güldener and Marc Dobruk, bassist Stanislaw Czywil, and drummer Simon Yildirim. They released three albums and one EP before disbanding in 2020.

In 2020, Sallach replaced Sebastian Biesler as the new "clean" vocalist and lyricist for Electric Callboy alongside "unclean" vocalist Kevin Ratajczak, and they released the EP MMXX (2020) with a music video for the song "Hypa Hypa". The band's first album with Sallach, Tekkno (2022), spent a week at No. 1 on the German album charts. Since Sallach joined the band, it has increasingly incorporated wider musical influences such as pop and EDM. He writes most of the lyrics together with Ratajczak.

== Discography ==
=== To the Rats and Wolves ===
Albums

- Neverland (2016)
- Dethroned (2016)
- Cheap Love (2019)

EPs

- Young.Used.Wasted. (2013)

=== Electric Callboy ===
Albums

- Tekkno (2022)
- Tanzneid (2026)

EPs

- MMXX (2020)

=== As featured artist ===
- "Changes" by Breathe Atlantis (2022)
- "Pizza Homicide" by Samurai Pizza Cats (2023)
