= Conquer Divide =

American rock band

- Origin: Michigan U.S.
- Genres: Metalcore; post-hardcore; alternative rock
- Years active: 2013–2018, 2020–present
- Labels: Mascot; Artery
- Members: Kiarely Castillo; Kristen Sturgis; Isabel Johnson; Samantha Landa
- Past members: Tamara Tadic; Ashley Colby; Sarah Stonebraker; Suzie Reagan; Janel Duarte
- Website: conquerdivideofficial.com

Conquer Divide is an American rock band whose members are from the United States, the United Kingdom, and Canada, with one former member coming from Serbia.

== History ==
The band was formed in Michigan by guitarist and songwriter Kristen Sturgis along with Suzie Reagan. The lineup initially began as a five-piece with the addition of bassist Sarah Stonebraker, drummer Tamara Tadic, and singer Kiarely Castillo in 2013. On March 1, 2014, Conquer Divide announced that they had recruited Liverpool-based YouTube guitarist Izzy Johnson to become a member, making it a six-piece. A short time later, Suzie was let go and replaced by Texas-based vocalist Janel Duarte. Although their official biography featured on the Artery Recordings website states that they were formed in 2013, the concept for the band had existed since about 2005, according to their producer Joey Sturgis.

== Career ==
=== 2013–2017: Self-titled debut album ===
On December 2, 2013, Conquer Divide released a lyric video for their first single "Eyes Wide Shut" via YouTuber BryanStars' channel. Shortly after the release, they signed to Artery Recordings in mid-2014. The band worked with producer Joey Sturgis (We Came as Romans, Asking Alexandria, The Devil Wears Prada, Blessthefall) on their self-titled debut album. It features guest vocals by Denis Shaforostov (known by his stage moniker Denis Stoff) formerly of Asking Alexandria. It also features a collaboration with Andrew Oliver of I See Stars on the song "Lost". They later posted a video about the process of making the band and the album.

On July 24, 2015, at the Hard Rock Cafe in Las Vegas, Nevada, their album was officially released. The same day, the album reached #4 on the iTunes Metal Chart and ranked #8 on Billboard's Top HeatSeekers chart. On May 24, 2016, the band released a video for their song 'What's Left Inside', which held steady on Billboard's top 40 Mainstream Rock chart for over six weeks, peaking at #23 in August 2016.

The band went on to support the release of their album on the Allstars Tour, which went across North America. They also played festivals such as South By Southwest, South By So What, and Treasure Fest supporting Crown The Empire, Beartooth, In This Moment, Motionless In White, Attila, The Color Morale, Chiodos, and Enter Shikari. The band also toured across North America with Upon A Burning Body, Dance Gavin Dance, Iwrestledabearonce, Capture The Crown, Slaves, Outline In Color, Alesana, Dayshell, A Skylit Drive, Oceano, Within The Ruins, The Browning, and The Funeral Portrait. On March 10, 2016, vocalist Janel Duarte announced that Izzy Johnson was temporarily unable to tour with the band due to wrist surgery. She was replaced by former Hopeless Records's SycAmour member Blake Howard for one tour.

During 2015, their music video for "Nightmares" was featured daily in Journeys stores nationwide. "What's Left Inside" was also featured nationwide in Journeys stores in 2016. Guitarist Kristen Sturgis released a playthrough video of their single "Nightmares" via Guitar World on August 4, 2015. The band has also seen success on Japanese charts after partnering with Japanese label Five One Inc. in February 2016. They released a lyric video for the unplugged version of "Eyes Wide Shut" exclusive for Japan, on May 24, 2016. "Sink Your Teeth Into This" was featured in an NHL commercial for the Detroit Red Wings hockey team via Windsor-Detroit's 89x CIMX-FM radio station.

On June 22, 2017, a tour with I Set My Friends On Fire and Arsonists Get All The Girls was announced.

=== 2020–2021 ===
On August 6, 2020, after a brief hiatus, the band released their first song since 2015, "Chemicals", along with an accompanying music video, featuring Canadian drummer Samantha Landa (ex-Nervosa). Chemicals went on to receive critical acclaim and was hailed as "a contender for best hard rock / metalcore crossover of the year" by Alternative Press magazine, and was later picked up by SiriusXM Octane. On August 14, 2020, they released a cover of Billie Eilish's "Bad Guy" which was picked up by SiriusXM Octane's Accelerator and landed the number 17 spot on their Octane Costume Covers Countdown Contest out of 100 active rock cover nominations.

On May 11, 2021, they released a new single titled "Messy", with the music video featuring all band members. Unlike many of their previous songs, "Messy" is entirely sung by clean vocalist Kia Castillo. Messy was added into regular rotation on SiriusXM Octane and reached number 6 on the Foundations Chart, as well as number one most added to Billboard's Hard Rock Indicator Chart. They released a version featuring Kellin Quinn of Sleeping With Sirens on July 16, 2021.

On October 19, 2021, the band announced on social media that they would be direct support for Attack Attack in 2022. The band also announced a 2022 fall tour supporting Outline In Color, Attack Attack! and Electric Callboy

=== 2022–present: Slow Burn ===
On May 17, 2022, it was announced that the band signed to Mascot Records by President Ron Burman, who also signed Nickelback to Roadrunner Records in 1999 when he was Senior Vice President of A&R at Roadrunner. To coincide with the announcement, the band released a new standalone single, "Atonement."

On June 8, 2022, they released a single and music video called "Fuckboi" with German metalcore band Electric Callboy via Century Media, of which both bands are featured in the music video. The song is included on Electric Callboy's 2022 album Tekkno.

The band released a new single "Paralyzed," on October 26, 2022, alongside its official music video. They also confirmed that they have begun work on their second studio album "Slow Burn". Rocksound Magazine stated the song was "designed for arenas" and a "monster" (of a track), while Metalhammer Magazine stated "Conquer Divide are showing off their own capability for massive earworms with the ultra-addictive Paralyzed... the true MVP of Paralyzed is the absolutely enormous chorus".

It was announced that the band would be playing Welcome To Rockville, supporting Slipknot, Rob Zombie, Queens of the Stone Age, Trivium, Bullet for My Valentine, and Black Veil Brides on Thursday, May 18, 2023. They later announced they were added to Blue Ridge Rock Festival supporting Slipknot, Flyleaf, Motionless In White, Lorna Shore, Sleep Token and Tech N9ne on September 8, 2023. The band announced they would support Electric Callboy on their sold-out Tekkno tour and would follow up as direct support for Icon for Hire across North America.

On May 11, 2023, the band released "welcome2paradise", along with a music video. They also announced the name of the second album titled "Slow Burn", which was released on September 8, 2023. On July 27, 2023, the band released a 5th single and music video towards their sophomore effort "Slow Burn" titled "N E W H E A V E N".

On March 12, 2024, the band announced that unclean vocalist and bassist Janel Duarte would be stepping back to focus on personal endeavors. The following day, the band announced American Idol contestant Madison Spencer would be touring with them as direct support for The Warning on a sold-out tour in Europe, followed by a North American Tour with Avatar. The band would headline their own tour titled Slow Burn tour for August to October 2024 dates. Spencer Maybe from A War Within toured with them, on bass and unclean vocals.

On January 15, 2025, the band released a standalone single "Bad Dreams", which features Tyler Ennis of Of Virtue. The band would later tour with New Years Day for UK tours in January 2025 and Ankor for European tours from April to March 2025. Following the tours, the band announced that Landa will be taking a maternity leave from touring but remains in the band. The band are currently writing new music and working on their third album.

On October 29, 2025, the band released another standalone single "The Ocean Between Us", along with its accompanying music video. The band is confirmed to perform at Sonic Temple Festival playing with Bloodywood, The Plot In You, We Came As Romans and Electric Callboy, which will take place in Columbus, Oh in May 2026.

== Style, influences and lyrical content ==
Conquer Divide's older style has been primarily described as metalcore, post-hardcore and alternative rock. Among the band's influences are Architects, We Came as Romans, and Parkway Drive, while Demi Lovato is one of Castillo's favorite singers. Others have noted similarities in the band's sound to metalcore bands such as Attack Attack!.

Although the band's self-titled debut album is primarily a metalcore record, its successor Slow Burn features a more varied alternative rock and hard rock sound, while preserving the band's original metalcore style on some tracks.

The lyrical content of the band's music is inspired mainly by personal experiences, which include dealings with prior band members, family, addiction, and relationships.

== Collaborations ==
Vocalist Kiarely Castillo collaborated with The Plot In You's vocalist Landon Tewers on his self-titled solo project. On December 14, 2015, they released a song together titled "Waste of My Time". She also performed a cover of "Scream" by Michael Jackson with German band Annisokay. Guitarist Kristen Sturgis wrote a vocal melody for Miss May I's song "Turn Back The Time" from their 2015 release Deathless. She also did vocal engineering, gang vocals, and translation work on Chunk No Captain Chunk's album Pardon My French in 2013. In 2018, Sturgis worked with popular YouTuber Meytal Cohen on an all-female rendition of Asking Alexandria's song "Into The Fire" for her new "Co-Lab" video series. Kiarely traded places with Sleeping With Sirens frontman Kellin Quinn in November 2020 on a "Freaky Friday" episode for Joey Sturgis Tones where Quinn sang "Chemicals" and Kiarely sang "P.S. Missing You" by Sleeping With Sirens. In April 2022, it was announced that the band would be featured on Electric Callboy's sixth album Tekkno, on the song "Fuckboi", which was co-written by Sturgis. On June 26, 2023, Kristen recorded backing vocals for Falling In Reverse on their cover of Papa Roach's song "Last Resort (Reimagined) ". In January 2026, the band cowrote with Stitched Up Heart on the song "Glitch Bitch", the song will be featured on the album Medusa, which will be released on June 12, 2026. The song features Kiarely singing, and Kristen debuting screaming vocals.

== Awards ==
The band's song "At War" was nominated for "Best Song" at the 2015 Relentless Kerrang Awards Their cover of "Bad Guy" by Billie Eilish was nominated for "BigUns of the year" in 2020 by SiriusXM Octane. "Paralyzed" was nominated for "Best Metal song of 2022" by Metal Hammer Magazine in the UK.

== Members ==
Current members

- Kiarely "Kia" Castillo – clean vocals (2013–present)
- Kristen Sturgis – rhythm guitar (2014–present), backing vocals (2023–present), lead guitar (2013–2014)
- Isabel "Izzy" Johnson – lead guitar (2014–present)
- Samantha "Sam" Landa – drums (2018–present)

Former members

- Janel Monique Duarte – unclean vocals (2014–2018, 2020–2024), backing and occasional clean vocals (2020–2024), bass (2017–2018, 2020–2024)
- Tamara Tadic – drums (2013–2017)
- Ashley Colby – bass (2015–2017)
- Sarah Stonebraker – bass (2013–2015)
- Suzie Reagan – unclean vocals (2013–2014), rhythm guitar (2013–2014), clean vocals (2013)

Touring members

- Spencer Maybe – bass, unclean and backing clean vocals (2024–present)
- Ryan Ritthaler – drums (2025–present; touring substitute for Samantha Landa)
- Blake Howard – lead guitar (March–April 2016, touring substitute for Izzy Johnson)
- Niko Karras – lead guitar (October–November 2022, touring substitute for Izzy Johnson)
- Madison Spencer – unclean and backing clean vocals (March–June 2024)

Timeline

== Discography ==
=== Studio albums ===
List of studio albums, with selected details
Title	Details
Conquer Divide	Released: July 24, 2015; Label: Artery
Slow Burn	Released: September 8, 2023; Label: Mascot

=== Extended plays ===
List of extended plays, with selected details
Title	Details
New Heaven	Released: July 27, 2023; Label: Mascot

=== Singles ===
List of singles, with selected chart positions and certifications, showing year released and album name
Title	Peak chart positions	Album	Release Date
Title	US Main.	Album	Release Date
"Eyes Wide Shut"	—	Non-album singles (later re-recorded for Conquer Divide)	November 29, 2013
"At War"	—	Non-album singles (later re-recorded for Conquer Divide)	November 4, 2014
"Sink Your Teeth Into This" (feat. Denis Stoff of Asking Alexandria)	—	Conquer Divide	June 16, 2015
"Nightmares"	—	Conquer Divide	July 29, 2015
"What's Left Inside"	—	Conquer Divide	May 24, 2016
"Eyes Wide Shut" (acoustic)	—	Conquer Divide (Japan exclusive)	September 11, 2016
"Chemicals"	—	Non-album singles	August 6, 2020
"Messy"	—	Non-album singles	May 11, 2021
"Messy" (feat. Kellin Quinn of Sleeping with Sirens)	—	Non-album singles	July 16, 2021
"Atonement"	—	Slow Burn	March 28, 2022
"Paralyzed" (original or feat. Chris Parketny of Attack Attack!)	40	Slow Burn	October 26, 2022
"welcome2paradise"	—	Slow Burn	May 10, 2023
"the INVISIBLE"	—	Slow Burn	June 15, 2023
"N E W H E A V E N"	—	Slow Burn	July 27, 2023
"Bad Dreams" (feat. Tyler Ennis of Of Virtue)	—	TBA	January 15, 2025
"The Ocean Between Us"	—	TBA	October 29, 2025

Other songs

List of singles, with selected chart positions and certifications, showing year released and album name
Title	Peak chart positions		Album	Release Date
Title	US Airplay	US Main.	Album	Release Date
"FCKBOI" (with Electric Callboy)	—	—	Tekkno	July 8, 2022
"The Optimist" (with 10 Years)	31	9	Inner Darkness	September 12, 2024
"Glitch Bitch" (with Stitched Up Heart)	—	—	Medusa	January 6, 2026
