= Groundhog (disambiguation) =

A groundhog is a small mammal (Marmota monax).

Groundhog may also refer to:

- The Groundhogs, British blues and rock band
- "Groundhog", a song written by Paul Simon
- Groundhog (comics), a fictional character
- "Groundhogs (The Bear)", a 2025 episode of The Bear TV show

== See also ==
- Groundhog Day (disambiguation)
