= Electric Callboy =

German electronicore band

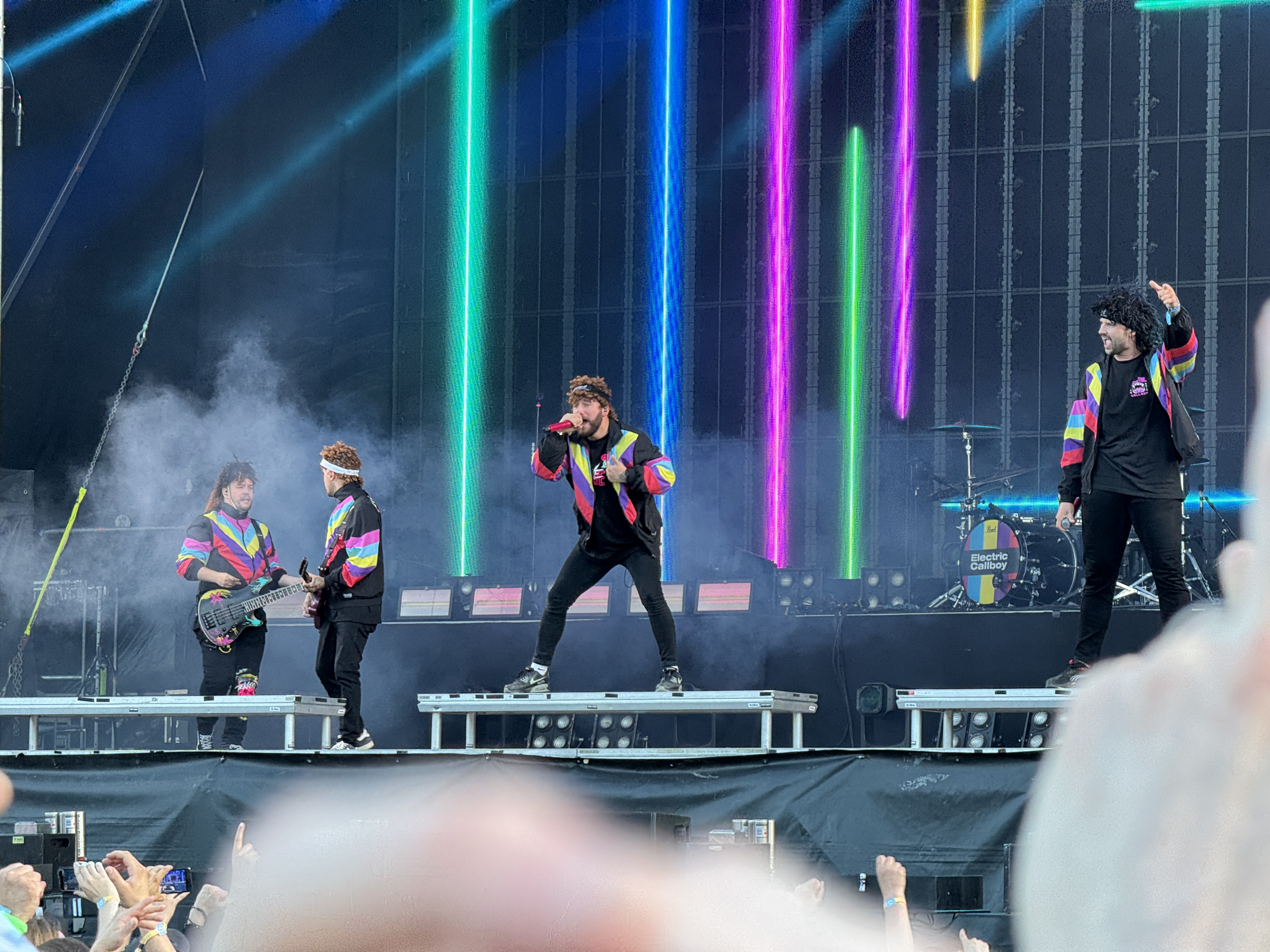
- Electric Callboy at Ilosaarirock in 2024

Background information
- Also known as: Eskimo Callboy (2010–2022)
- Origin: Castrop-Rauxel, Germany
- Genres: Electronicore; post-hardcore; metalcore; melodic metalcore
- Years active: 2010–present
- Labels: Redfield; Spinefarm; Radtone Music (Japan); Universal; Century Media
- Spinoffs: Ghostkid
- Members: Kevin Ratajczak; Daniel "Danskimo" Haniß; Pascal Schillo; Daniel Klossek; Nico Sallach; Frank Zummo
- Past members: Michael "Micha" Malitzki; Sebastian "Sushi" Biesler; David Friedrich
- Website: electriccallboy.com

Electric Callboy, formerly Eskimo Callboy, is a German electronicore band formed in Castrop-Rauxel in 2010. Initially noted for their serious lyrics and post-hardcore sound, they underwent a line-up and name change during the early 2020s and have since garnered mainstream attention for their comedic songs, live shows, and music videos. They also occasionally perform DJ sets under the name Electric Bassboy.

== History ==
=== Early releases and Bury Me in Vegas (2010–2013) ===
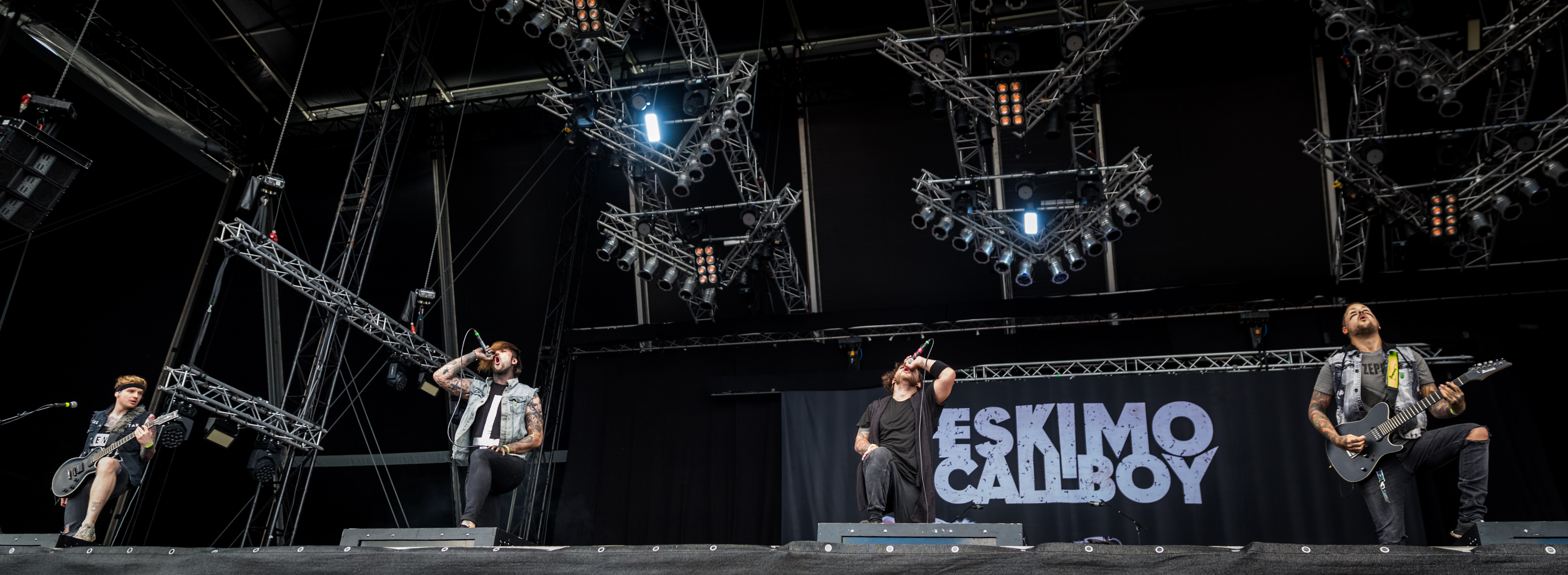
Electric Callboy (then Eskimo Callboy) at Wacken Open Air in 2016

The band's debut EP, Eskimo Callboy, was self-released in 2010 and was distributed via EMP. The band later re-released the EP via their then recording label Redfield Records. The band was a support act for groups like Bakkushan, Callejon, Ohrbooten, We Butter the Bread with Butter, and Neaera. At festivals, the group shared the stage with acts like Casper, Distance in Embrace, and Rantanplan. In 2011, they played at Traffic Jam Open Air and Mair1 Festival. Their debut album Bury Me in Vegas was released worldwide via Redfield Records on 23 March 2012. Between 28 and 30 September 2012, the band toured Japan on the Geki Rock Tour, then toured China and Russia.

In October and November 2012, the band opened for Callejon on their tour through Germany and Austria. During the final show of the tour, at Live Music Hall in Cologne on 10 November 2012, nine fans were injured after pieces of the ceiling fell onto the moshpit area. The concert was stopped and rescheduled to take place at E-Werk in Cologne on 23 February 2013, for which the band could not appear due to touring with The Browning, Close to Home, and Intohimo through Europe.

On 17 November 2012, the band announced after a concert in Düsseldorf that they were parting ways with their drummer Michael Maletzki, who was replaced by David Friedrich. In April 2013, the band toured the United States for the first time alongside Kottonmouth Kings and Deuce. In August, the band made an appearance at Wacken Open Air, as well as returning to the Geki Rock Tour in Japan. The band won the Up And Coming Award at the German Metal Hammer Awards, held in Berlin on 13 September 2013.

=== We Are the Mess, Crystals, The Scene, Rehab, and departure of Biesler (2013–2020) ===
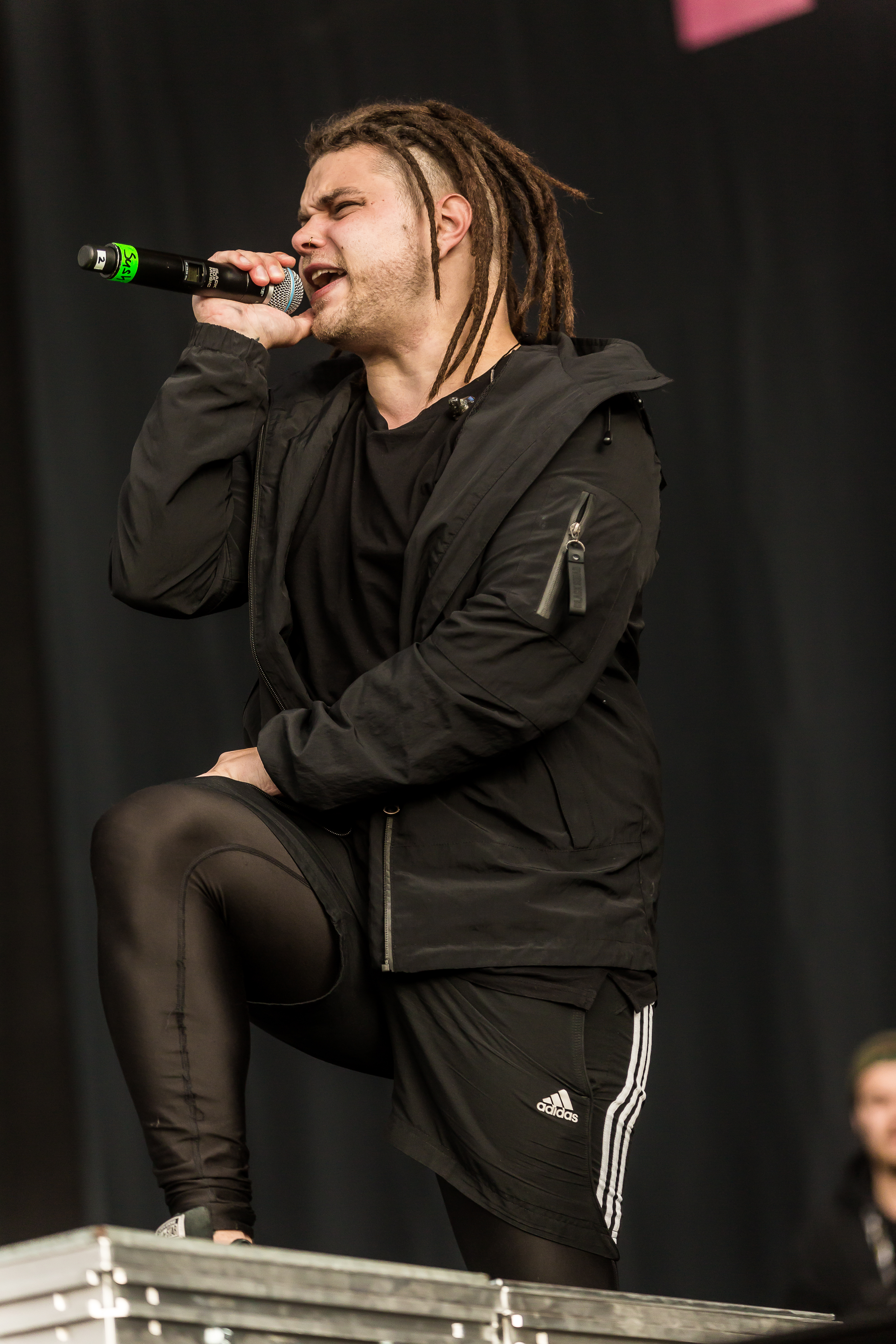
Biesler performing with the band in 2018

The band started recording their second album, We Are the Mess, at Kohlekeller Studios with producer Kristian Kohlmannslehner in autumn 2013. The album was released on 10 January 2014 via Redfield Records and Warner Music Japan. The band played five shows in Germany supported by Annisokay. We Are the Mess peaked at No. 8 on Germany's official long-play charts and No. 64 in Austria. The band also toured in Japan to promote their album. In March, the band toured Europe supported by Iwrestledabearonce, Her Bright Skies, and To the Rats and Wolves.

In August 2019, the band released the single "Hurricane" from their fifth studio album Rehab, which was released on 1 November. Following the release of Rehab, the band embarked on their Rehab European Tour 2019. On 12 February 2020, they announced that lead singer Biesler would be leaving the band. He soon after announced his new project Ghostkid, formed with former members of To the Rats and Wolves.

=== Tekkno and addition of Nico Sallach (2020–2024) ===
On 24 April 2020, co-lead singer Kevin Ratajczak announced that the band had found Biesler's replacement, which was confirmed to be Nico Sallach (former frontman of To the Rats and Wolves, who toured with the band seven years prior) on 4 June. On 19 June, the band released the song "Hypa Hypa", with its accompanying music video signalling a more comedic direction for the band and becoming their most-viewed YouTube video. On 24 July, the band released the song "Hate/Love". On 11 September, the band released the EP MMXX.

On 3 September 2021, the band released the song "We Got the Moves", whose music video overtook "Hypa Hypa" to become their most-viewed YouTube video. On 3 December, the band released the song "Pump It". On 6 December, the band announced that they had applied to represent Germany in the 2022 Eurovision Song Contest with "Pump It", but ultimately were not included in the final list of participants.

In December, the band announced that they were removing a selection of their old songs from all platforms due to lyrics that had "become increasingly problematic in modern times". In March 2022, they announced that they had changed their name from Eskimo Callboy to Electric Callboy after learning that "Eskimo" can be seen as an outdated term and slur for the Inuit and Yupik people. They subsequently re-released the artwork from their previous albums with their new name. On 8 April, they released their first song under their new name, "Spaceman" featuring rapper Finch. On 15 April, they announced their next album Tekkno, to be released on 9 September 2022.

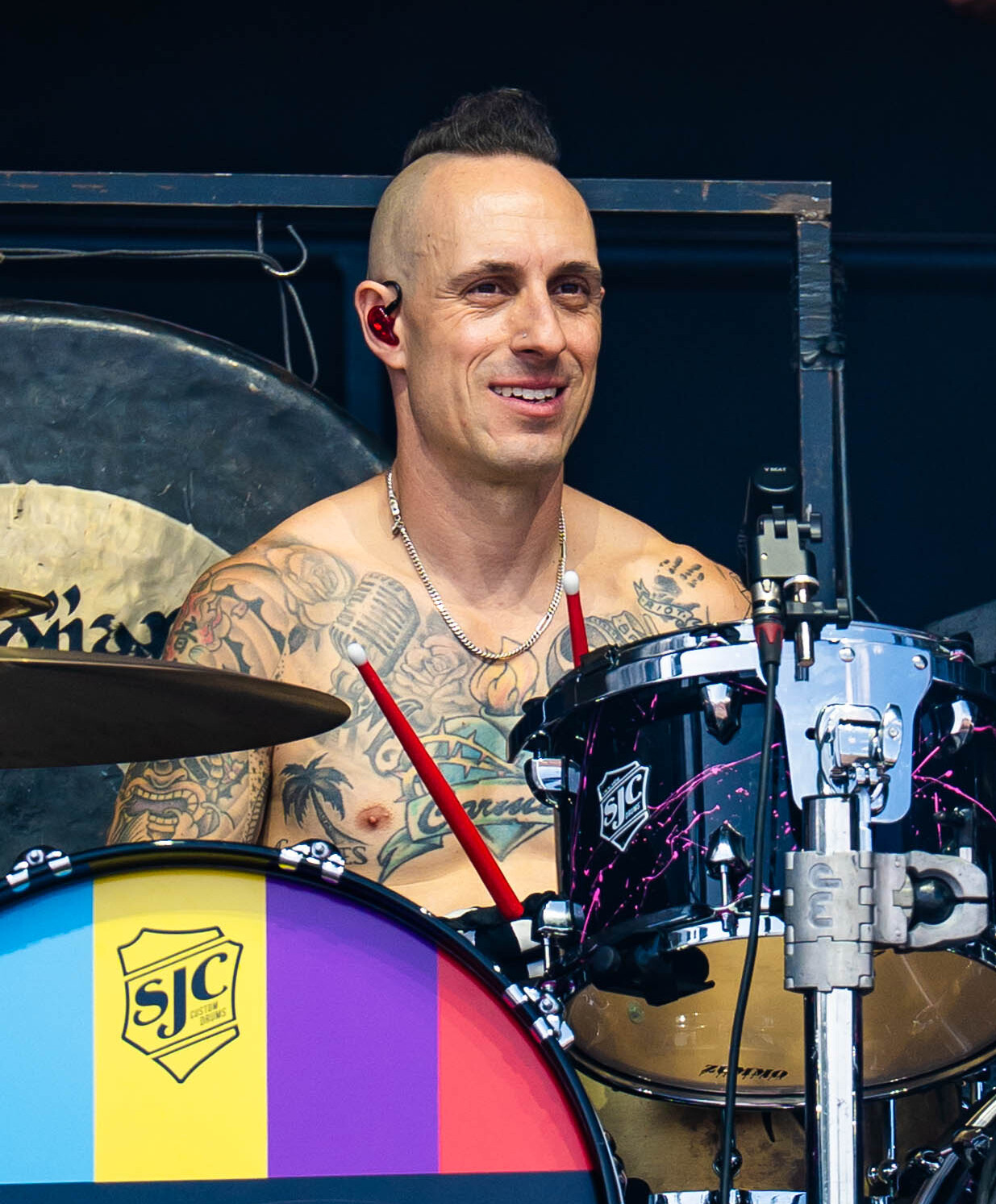
Drummer Frank Zummo (formerly of Sum 41) began touring with the Electric Callboy in October 2025

On 8 July 2022, the band released a song called "Fuckboi" alongside American metalcore band Conquer Divide. On 19 August, they released the song "Hurrikan" (unrelated to their old song "Hurricane"), and the release date for Tekkno was changed to 16 September 2022. Tekkno entered the German charts at No. 1 in the first week after release, the highest ranking any of their records achieved. In the following week, they had to postpone their UK and France tour as well as cancelling their participation on the US Level-Up Tour with Attack Attack! due to Sallach suffering from a jaw and ear infection.

=== Departure of David-Karl Friedrich, addition of Frank Zummo, and Tanzneid (2024–present) ===
On 23 May 2024, the band released the single "Ratatata" alongside Japanese metal band Babymetal, which was used by WWE as the theme song for that year's Bash in Berlin event. During the band's tour in Australia, former Sum 41 drummer Frank Zummo filled in on drums when Friedrich departed unexpectedly due to illness.

On 24 January 2025, the band released the single "Elevator Operator". On 29 April, Friedrich announced his departure from Electric Callboy after 13 years with the band, stating his intention to pursue a new direction in life. The band confirmed they would perform the upcoming tour with a new drummer, with Zummo eventually returning. On 23 May, the band released the single "Revery". On 31 October, the band announced the 2025–2026 Tanzneid World Tour and released the song "Tanzneid" with a music video featuring Zummo on drums for the first time. On 16 April 2026, the band announced their upcoming seventh studio album, Tanzneid, set for release on 7 August 2026. Along with the announcement, they also released the single, "Hypercharged", in collaboration with the Brawl Stars mobile game. On 5 June 2026, they released the single "Let the Good Times Roll" featuring The Offspring, with the song premiering on SiriusXM’s Octane channel the day before.

On 10 August 2026, Zummo confirmed through Instagram he was the official drummer for Electric Callboy going forward.

== Musical style and influences ==
The band's musical style can be described as electronicore, metalcore, melodic metalcore, post-hardcore, comedy rock, dubstep, and electro. The musicians named bands like Asking Alexandria and Attack Attack! as their musical influences. Their singer stated that the musicians don't feel like being a part of the "hardcore music scene".

Their lyrics deal with themes such as getting drunk, parties, and sex. The band call their music "Porno Metal". In an interview with the German magazine FUZE, vocalist Sebastian Biesler said that their lyrics only use clichés in a satirical way. German Metal Hammer magazine published a positive review of the band, writing, "This is why Eskimo Callboy is enjoyable: because they dismiss themselves and let the fun rule".

== Band members ==
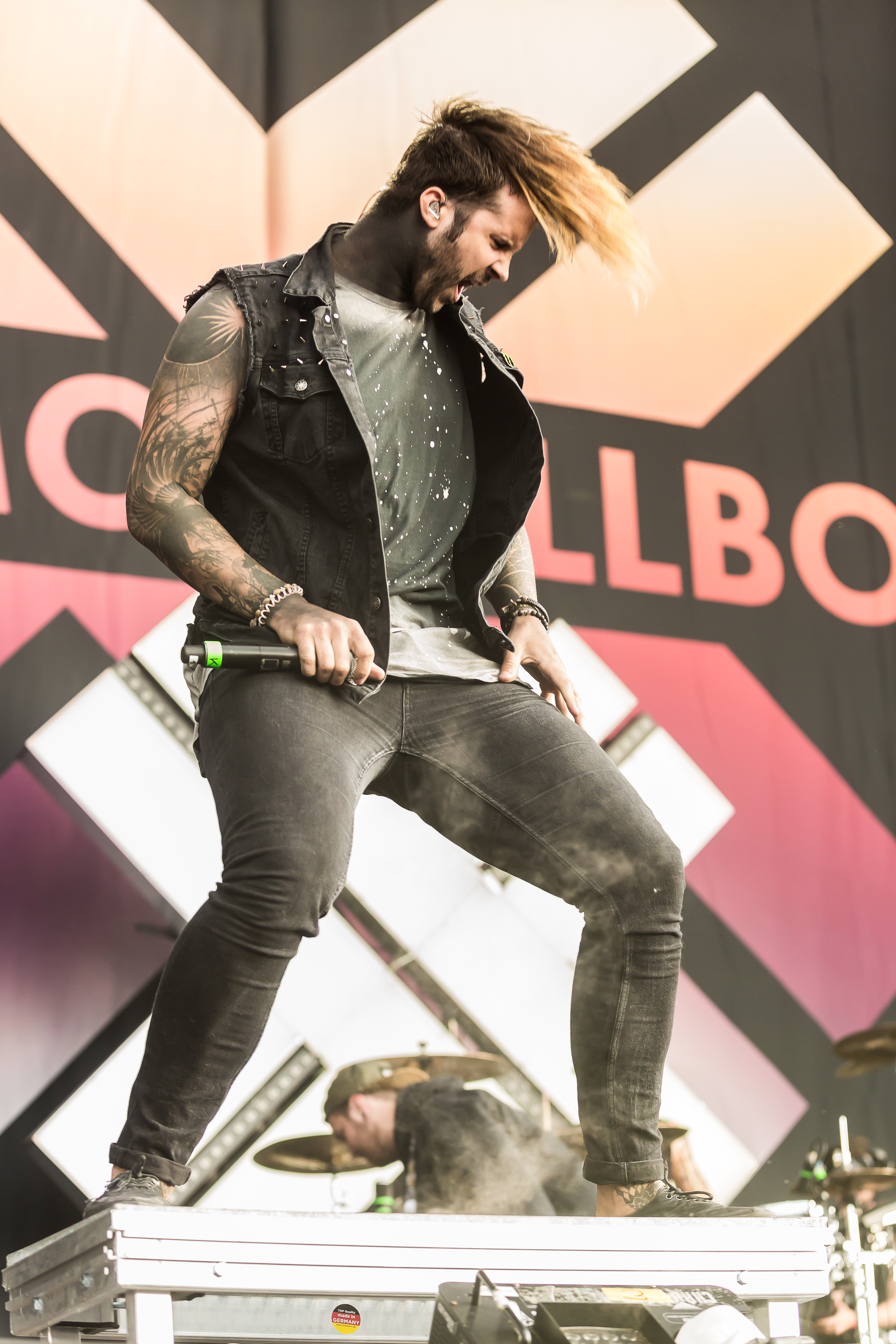
Kevin Ratajczak

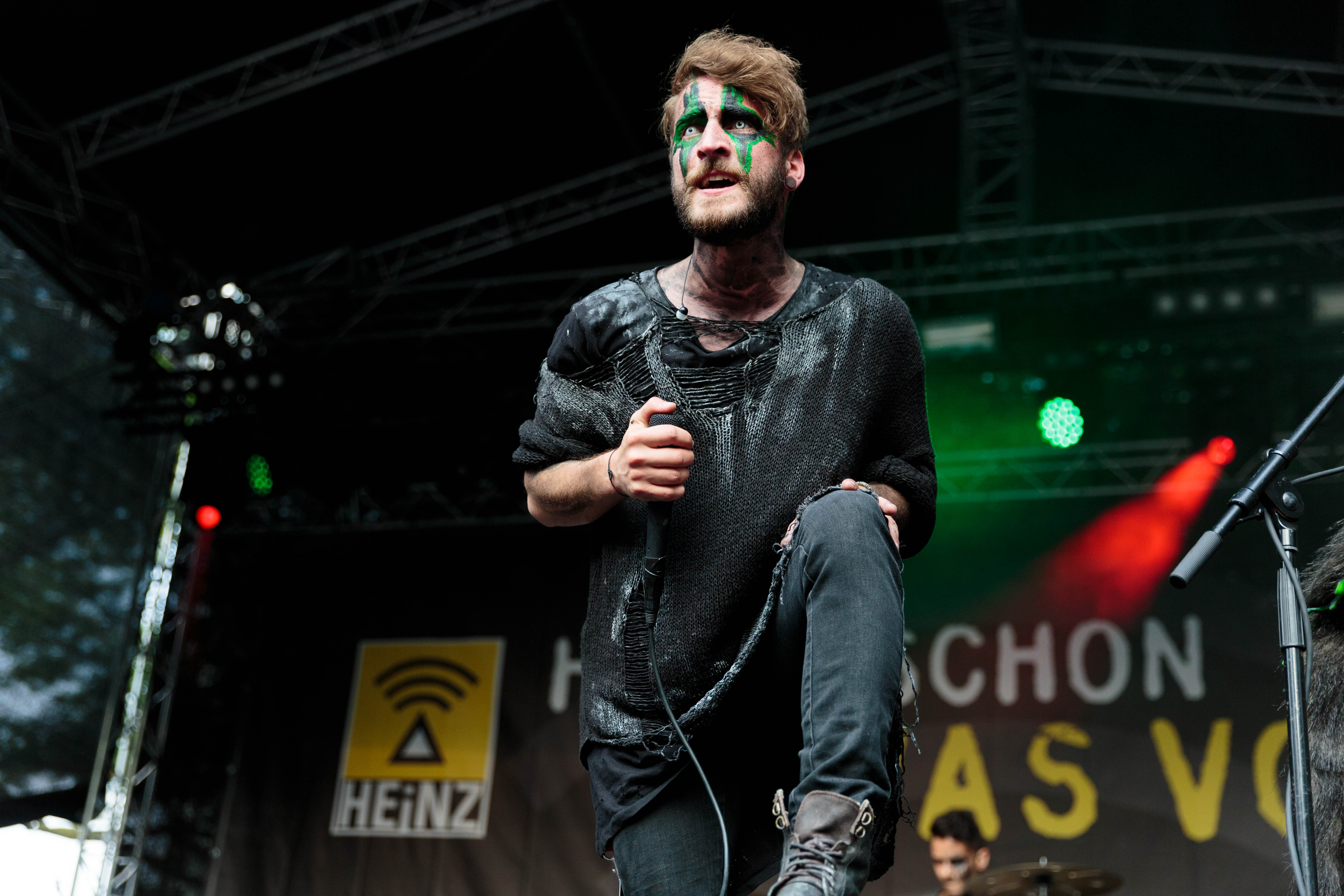
Nico Sallach

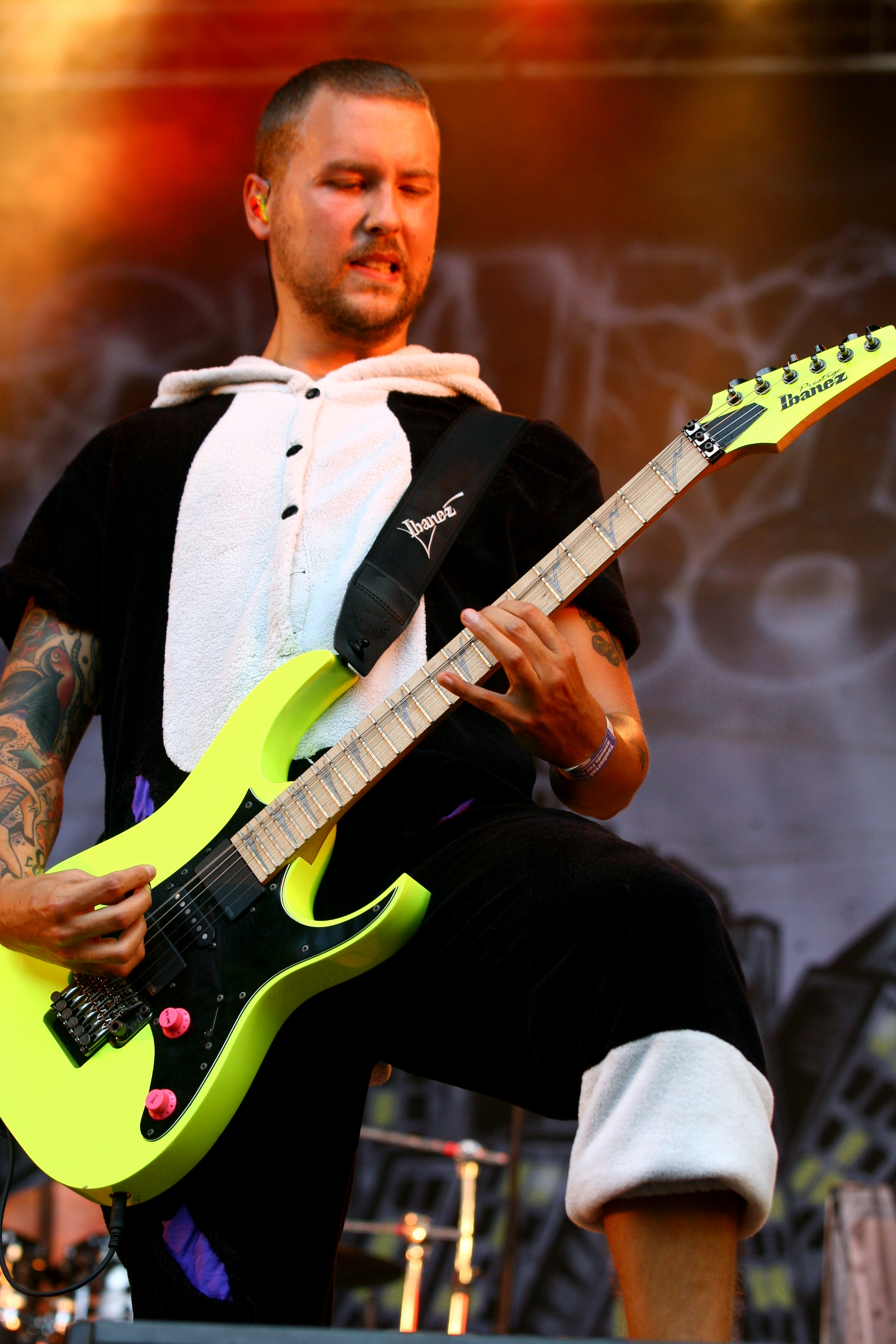
Daniel "Danskimo" Haniß

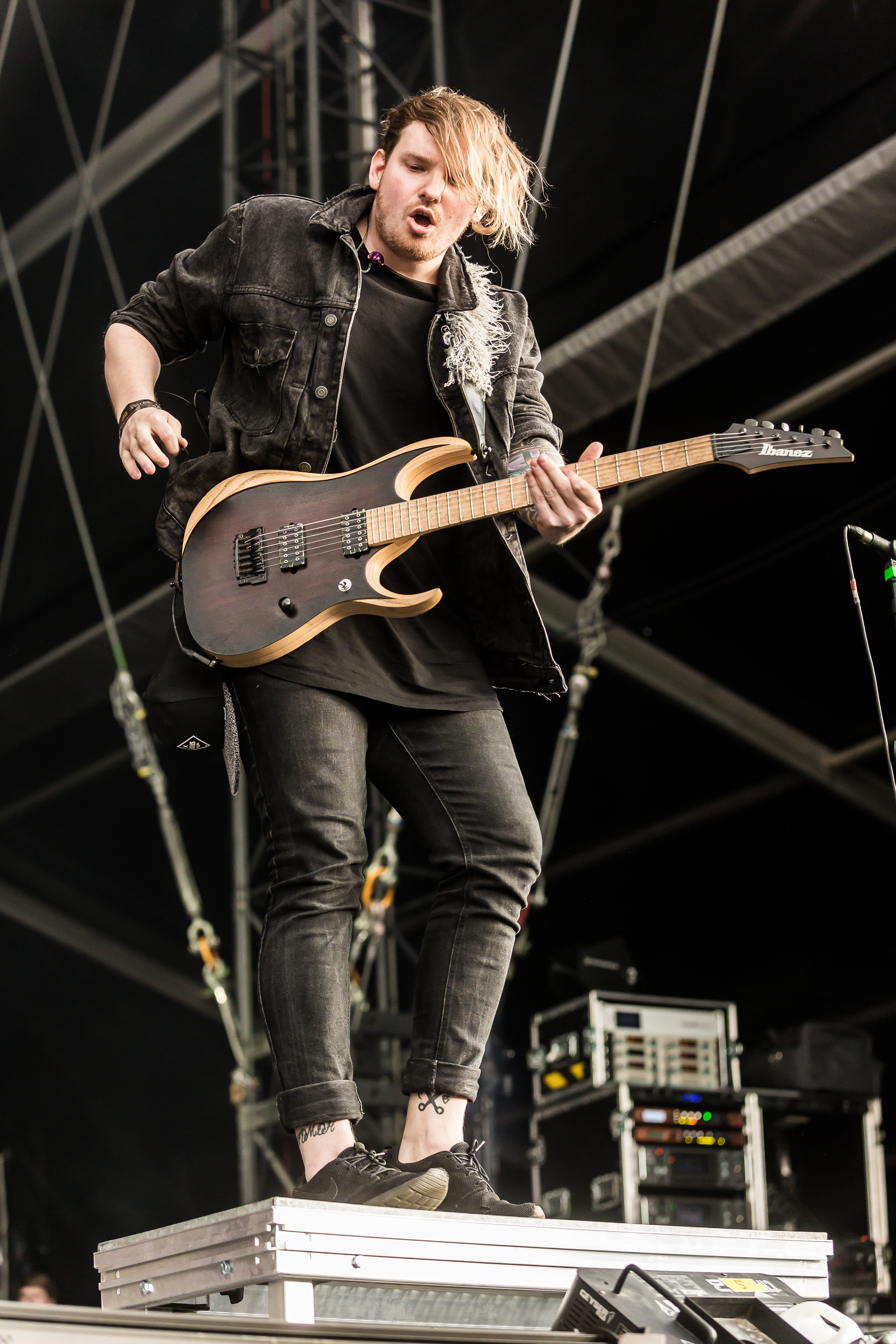
Pascal Schillo

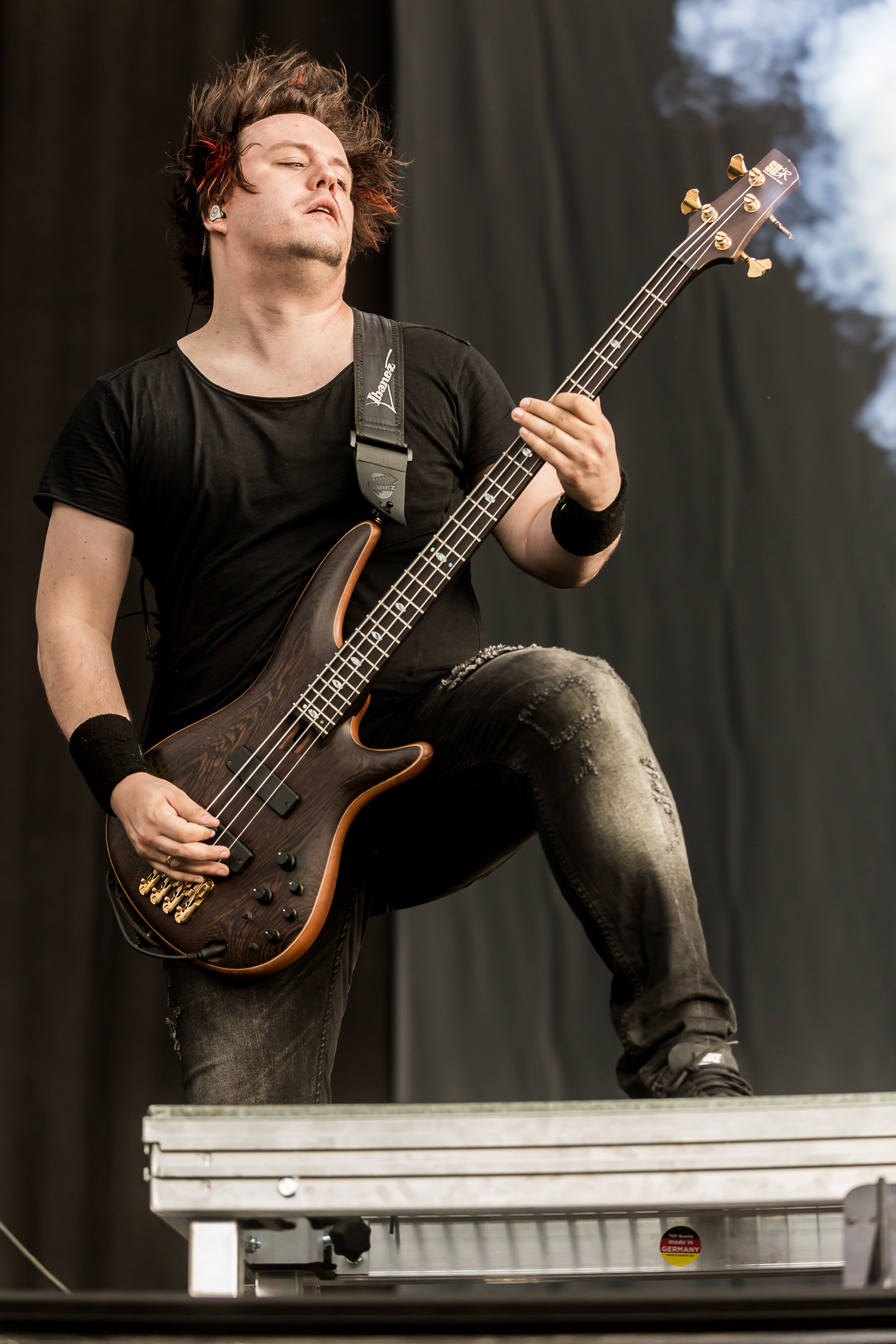
Daniel Klossek

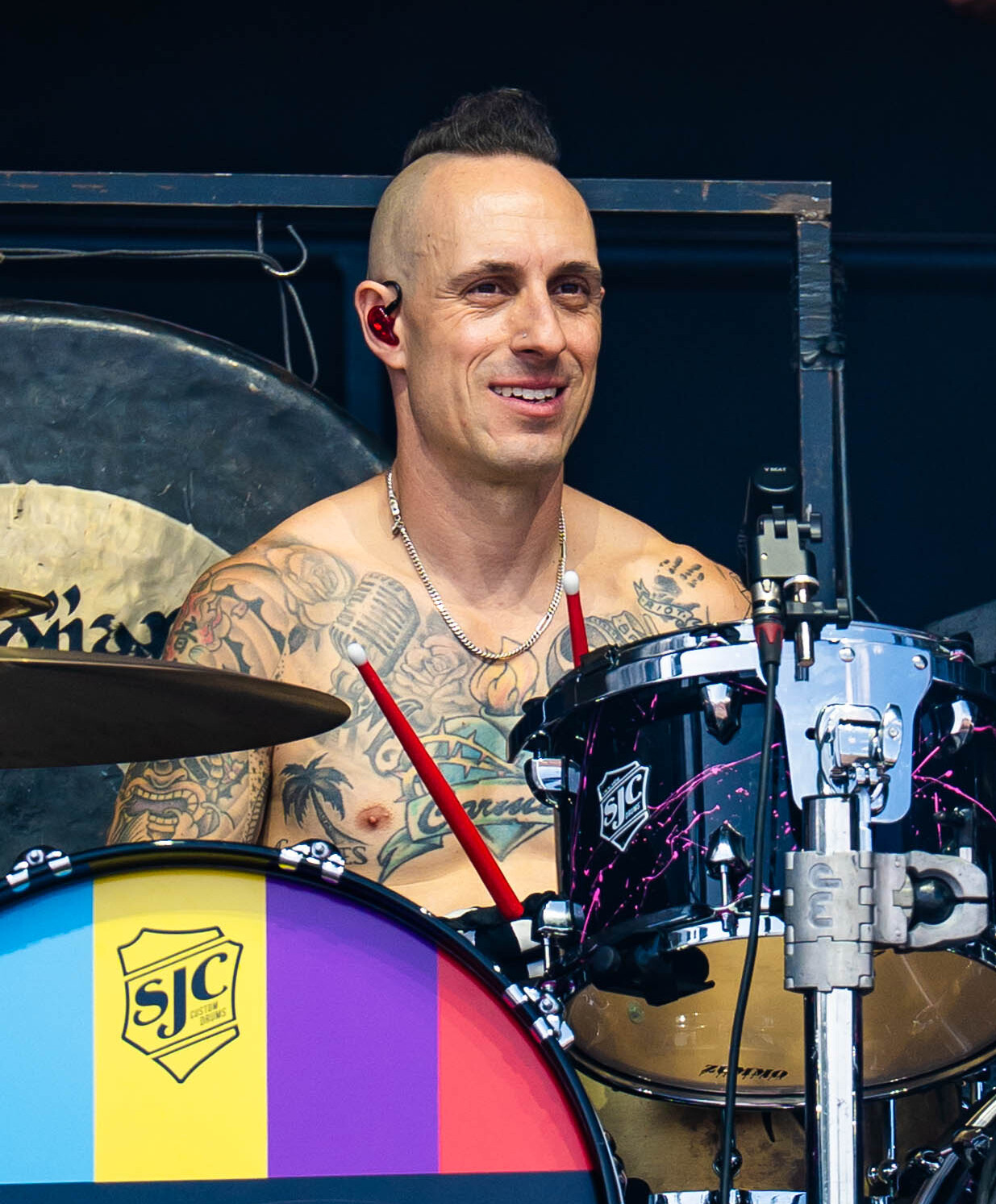
Frank Zummo

Current

- Daniel "Danskimo" Haniß – lead guitar (2010–present)
- Daniel Klossek – bass, backing vocals (2010–present)
- Kevin Ratajczak – lead vocals, keyboards, programming (2010–present)
- Pascal Schillo – rhythm guitar, backing vocals (2010–present)
- Nico Sallach – lead vocals (2020–present)
- Frank Zummo – drums (2026–present; touring musician 2024, 2025–2026)

Former

- Michael "Micha" Malitzki – drums (2010–2012; guest 2022)
- Sebastian "Sushi" Biesler – lead vocals (2010–2020)
- David-Karl Friedrich – drums (2012–2025)

Timeline

== Discography ==
=== Studio albums ===
List of studio albums, with selected chart positions
| Title | Album details | Peak positions | | | | | | | | | Certifications |
| Title | Album details | GER | AUS | AUT | BEL (FL) | BEL (WA) | FIN | NLD | SWI | UK | Certifications |
|---|---|---|---|---|---|---|---|---|---|---|---|
| Bury Me in Vegas | Released: 23 March 2012; Label: Redfield; Format: CD, LP | 65 | — | — | — | — | — | — | — | — | |
| We Are the Mess | Released: 10 January 2014; Label: Redfield; Format: CD, LP, digital download, streaming | 8 | — | 64 | — | — | — | — | — | — | |
| Crystals | Released: 20 March 2015; Label: Spinefarm; Format: CD, LP, digital download, streaming | 6 | — | 54 | — | — | — | — | 70 | — | |
| The Scene | Released: 25 August 2017; Label: People Like You, Century Media; Format: CD, LP, digital download, streaming | 6 | — | 14 | — | — | — | — | 89 | — | |
| Rehab | Released: 1 November 2019; Label: Century Media; Format: CD, LP, digital download, streaming | 16 | — | 65 | — | — | — | — | — | — | |
| Tekkno | Released: 16 September 2022; Label: Century Media; Format: CD, LP, digital download, streaming | 1 | 66 | 3 | 9 | 123 | 13 | 27 | 6 | — | IFPI FIN: Gold; IFPI AUT: Gold; BMVI: Gold |
| Tanzneid | Released: 7 August 2026; Label: Century Media; Format: CD, LP, digital download, streaming | 1 | 11 | 2 | 8 | 3 | 10 | 16 | 4 | 62 | |

=== Extended plays ===
List of extended plays
| Title | EP details |
|---|---|
| Eskimo Callboy | Released: 3 September 2010; Label: Tone Df, Redfield; Format: CD |
| MMXX | Released: 11 September 2020; Label: Century Media; Format: CD, digital download, streaming |

=== Singles ===
List of singles, with selected chart positions
| Title | Year | Peak positions | | | | | Certifications | Album |
| Title | Year | GER | AUT | UK Rock | US Hard Rock | US Main. Rock | Certifications | Album |
|---|---|---|---|---|---|---|---|---|
| "Is Anyone Up?" | 2011 | — | — | — | — | — | | Bury Me in Vegas |
| "We Are the Mess" | 2013 | — | — | — | — | — | | We Are the Mess |
| "Best Day" | 2015 | — | — | — | — | — | | Crystals |
| "MC Thunder" | 2017 | — | — | — | — | — | | The Scene |
| "Hurricane" | 2019 | — | — | — | — | — | | Rehab |
| "Nice Boi" | 2019 | — | — | — | — | — | | Rehab |
| "Prism" | 2019 | — | — | — | — | — | | Rehab |
| "Hypa Hypa" | 2020 | 77 | — | — | — | — | BVMI: Gold; IFPI AUT: Gold; IFPI SWI: Gold | MMXX |
| "Hate/Love" | 2020 | — | — | — | — | — | | MMXX |
| "We Got the Moves" | 2021 | 93 | — | — | — | — | | Tekkno |
| "Pump It" | 2021 | 31 | — | — | — | — | | Tekkno |
| "Spaceman" (featuring Finch) | 2022 | 31 | — | — | — | — | IFPI AUT: Gold | Tekkno |
| "Fuckboi" (featuring Conquer Divide) | 2022 | — | — | — | — | — | | Tekkno |
| "Hurrikan" | 2022 | — | — | — | — | — | | Tekkno |
| "Ratatata" (with Babymetal) | 2024 | 55 | 66 | 22 | 6 | — | | Tanzneid |
| "Elevator Operator" | 2025 | 54 | 73 | 27 | 7 | — | | Tanzneid |
| "Revery" | 2025 | — | — | — | — | — | | Tanzneid |
| "Tanzneid" | 2025 | — | — | — | — | — | | Tanzneid |
| "Let The Good Times Roll" (featuring The Offspring) | 2025 | — | — | — | 9 | 21 | | Tanzneid |

=== Covers ===
List of singles, with selected chart positions
| Title | Original artist | Year | Peak positions | |
| Title | Original artist | Year | GER | US Hard Rock Digi. |
|---|---|---|---|---|
| "California Gurls" | Katy Perry | 2010 | — | — |
| "Cinema" | Benny Benassi and Skrillex | 2013 | — | — |
| "Everytime We Touch" | Cascada | 2023 | 95 | — |
| "Crawling" | Linkin Park | 2025 | — | — |
| "Still Waiting" | Sum 41 | 2025 | — | 8 |
| "Maniac" | Michael Sembello | 2026 | — | — |
| "You Say Run" | Yuki Hayashi | 2026 | — | — |

=== Music videos ===
| Year | Title | Director(s) |
|---|---|---|
| 2010 | "California Gurls" (Katy Perry cover) | Oliver Schillo |
| 2011 | "Is Anyone Up?" | Unknown |
| 2012 | "Muffin Purper-Gurk" | Eskimo Callboy |
| 2013 | "Cinema" (Skrillex/Benny Benassi cover) | Oliver Schillo and Pascal Schillo |
| 2013 | "We Are the Mess" | Eskimo Callboy and Oliver Schillo |
| 2014 | "Final Dance" | Tommy Antonini and Eskimo Callboy |
| 2015 | "Crystals" | Eskimo Callboy |
| 2015 | "Best Day" (featuring Sido) | Unknown |
| 2015 | "Baby (T.U.M.H.)" | Unknown |
| 2017 | "The Scene" (featuring Fronz) | Eskimo Callboy |
| 2017 | "MC Thunder" | Pascal Schillo and Oliver Schillo |
| 2017 | "VIP" | Pascal Schillo and Oliver Schillo |
| 2018 | "Shallows" | Christian Ripkens |
| 2019 | "Hurricane" | Unknown |
| 2019 | "Nice Boi" | Unknown |
| 2019 | "Prism" | Unknown |
| 2020 | "Made by America" | Christian Ripkens |
| 2020 | "Hypa Hypa" | Pascal Schillo and Oliver Schillo |
| 2020 | "Hate/Love" | Pascal Schillo and Oliver Schillo |
| 2020 | "MC Thunder II (Dancing Like a Ninja)" | Pascal Schillo and Oliver Schillo |
| 2021 | "We Got the Moves" | Pascal Schillo and Oliver Schillo |
| 2021 | "Pump It" | Pascal Schillo and Oliver Schillo |
| 2022 | "Spaceman" (featuring Finch) | Pascal Schillo and Oliver Schillo |
| 2022 | "Fckboi" (featuring Conquer Divide) | Pascal Schillo and Oliver Schillo |
| 2022 | "Hurrikan" | Pascal Schillo and Oliver Schillo |
| 2022 | "Arrow of Love" | Pascal Schillo and Oliver Schillo |
| 2022 | "Mindreader" | Mirko Witzki |
| 2023 | "Tekkno Train" | Pascal Schillo and Oliver Schillo |
| 2023 | "Everytime We Touch" (Cascada cover) | Pascal Schillo and Oliver Schillo |
| 2023 | "Parasite" | Christian Ripkens |
| 2024 | "Ratatata" | Pascal Schillo and Oliver Schillo |
| 2025 | "Elevator Operator" | Pascal Schillo and Oliver Schillo |
| 2025 | "Revery" | Pascal Schillo and Oliver Schillo |
| 2025 | "Still Waiting" (Sum 41 cover) | Pascal Schillo and Oliver Schillo |
| 2025 | "Tanzneid" | Pascal Schillo and Oliver Schillo |
| 2026 | "Let The Good Times Roll" (featuring The Offspring) | Schillobros & Florian Berwanger |

== Awards and nominations ==
=== Berlin Music Video Awards ===
| Year | Nominee/ work | Award | Result | Ref. |
|---|---|---|---|---|
| 2025 | "Elevator Operator" | Best Song | Nominated | |

=== German Metal Hammer Awards ===
| Year | Nominee / work | Award | Result | Ref. |
|---|---|---|---|---|
| 2013 | "N/A" | Up And Coming (best newcomer award) | Won | |

=== Impericon Awards ===
Award nominations at Impericon Awards
| Year | Nominee / work | Award | Result |
|---|---|---|---|
| 2020 | "Hypa Hypa" | Best Video | Won |
| 2021 | "We Got the Moves" | Best Music Video | Won |
| 2023 | "Everytime We Touch" | Best Music Video | Won |
| 2023 | Electric Callboy | Band of the Year | Nominated |
| 2023 | Electric Callboy | Best Live Band | Nominated |

=== Heavy Music Awards ===
Award nominations at Heavy Music Awards
| Year | Nominee / work | Award | Result |
|---|---|---|---|
| 2022 | "Pump It" | Best Video | Won |
| 2023 | Electric Callboy | Best International Live Artist | Won |
| 2023 | Electric Callboy | Best International Artist | Nominated |
| 2023 | "Hurrikan" | Best Video | Nominated |
| 2024 | Electric Callboy | Best International Live Artist | Won |

== Tours ==
- Hypa Hypa European Tour 2022 (2022)
- Tekkno World Tour (2023–2024)
- TANZNEID World Tour (2025–2026)
