= We Are the Mess =

Studio album by Electric Callboy
- Released: 10 January 2014
- Length: 34:30
- Label: Redfield
- Producer: Kristian Kohlmannslehner

Electric Callboy chronology
Bury Me in Vegas (2012)	We Are the Mess (2014)	Crystals (2015)

Singles from We Are the Mess
- 1. "We Are the Mess" Released: 29 November 2013; 2. "Final Dance" Released: 28 February 2014

Professional ratings
Review scores
Source	Rating
New Noise Magazine	3/5 stars
Rock Sound	6/10

We Are the Mess is the second studio album by German electronicore band Electric Callboy (formerly Eskimo Callboy). It was released on 10 January 2014 through Redfield Records. The album was entirely produced by Kristian Kohlmannslehner.

"Jagger Swagger" features guest appearances by Callejon's BastiBasti and former Hollywood Undead singer Deuce.

== Track listing ==
Standard edition
No.	Title	Length
1.	"CSTRP"	1:17
2.	"We Are the Mess"	3:11
3.	"Party at the Horror House"	3:34
4.	"Blood Red Lips"	3:36
5.	"Never Let You Know"	3:20
6.	"#elchtransformer"	1:22
7.	"Jagger Swagger" (featuring BastiBasti of Callejon and Deuce)	3:21
8.	"Ghosts of the Night"	3:28
9.	"Final Dance"	3:25
10.	"Voodoo Circus"	3:14
11.	"Broadway's Gonna Kill Us"	3:45
12.	"RXL"	0:57
Total length:		34:30

iTunes Store deluxe edition
No.	Title	Length
13.	"Final Dance" (Remix)	3:20
Total length:		37:50

Japanese edition
No.	Title	Length
13.	"Never Let You Know" (acoustic)	3:30
14.	"We Are the Mess" (remix)	3:10
15.	"Is Anyone Up?" (remix 2014)	4:10
Total length:		45:20

Special edition
No.	Title	Length
13.	"Never Let You Know" (acoustic)	3:30
Total length:		38:00

== Personnel ==
- Sebastian "Sushi" Biesler – vocals
- Kevin Ratajczak – vocals, keyboards
- Daniel Haniß – guitar
- Pascal Schillo – guitar
- Daniel Klossek – bass guitar
- David Friedrich – drums

Additional personnel

- Deuce – additional vocals on "Jagger Swagger"
- BastiBasti (Callejon) – additional performer on "Jagger Swagger"
- Kristian Kohlmannslehner – producer

== Charts ==
Chart performance for We Are the Mess
Chart	Peak position
Austrian Albums (Ö3 Austria)	64
German Albums (Offizielle Top 100)	8
