= Ghostkid =

German rock band

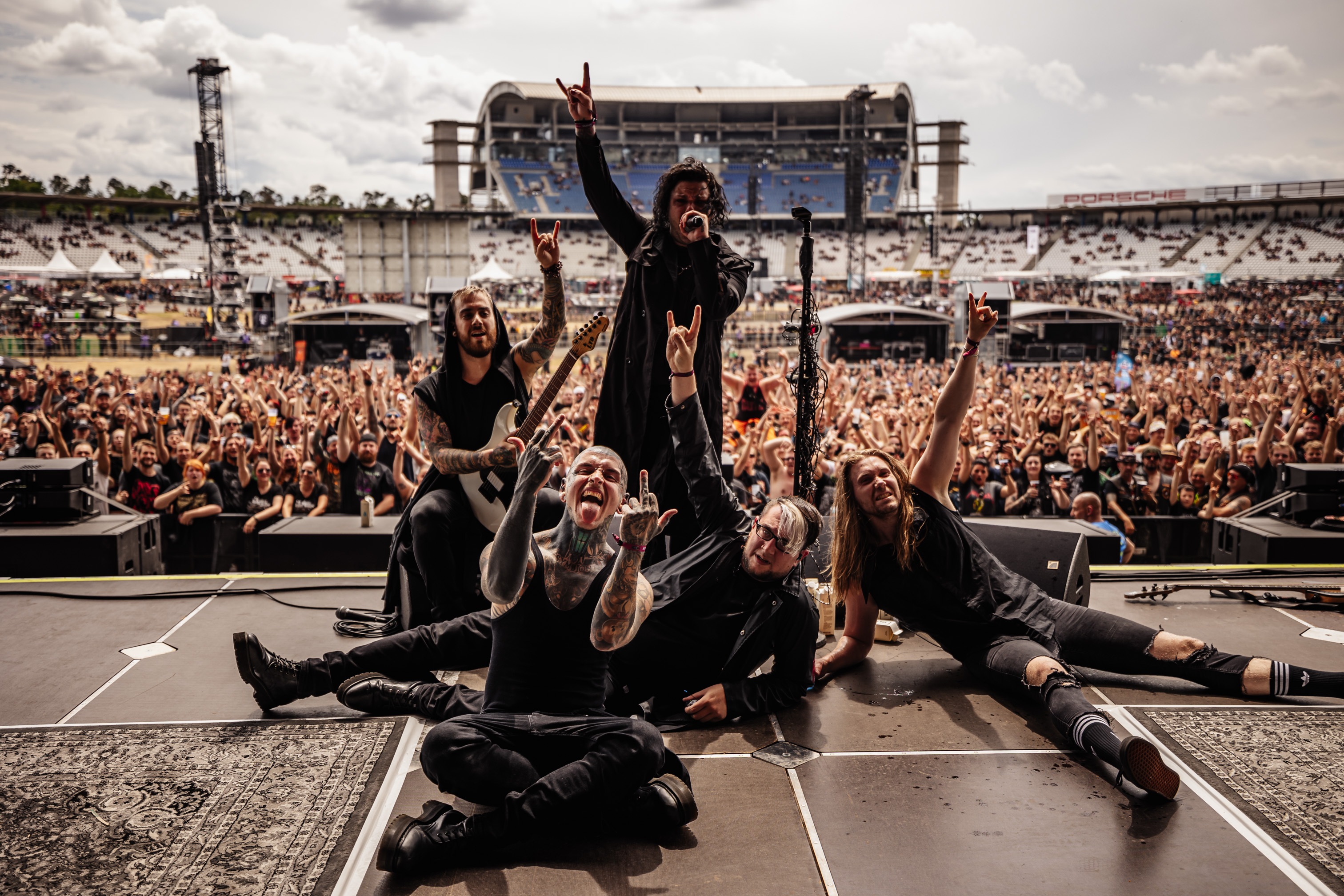
- Ghostkid at Download Festival, Hockenheimring, Germany in 2022

Background information
- Origin: Gelsenkirchen, Germany
- Genres: Metalcore; post-hardcore; nu metal; industrial metal; gothic metal
- Years active: 2020–present
- Label: Century Media
- Spinoff of: Electric Callboy; To the Rats and Wolves
- Members: Sebastian Biesler; David Friedrich; Iain Duncan; Axel One
- Past members: Daniel Güldener; Stanislaw Czywill; Jan Marco Heinz; Joakim Stephan Möller; Christian Kisseler
- Website: ghost-kid.de

Ghostkid (stylized as Ghøstkid) is a German rock band formed in Gelsenkirchen, in 2020. The band currently consists of vocalist and multi-instrumentalist Sebastian Biesler, guitarist Iain Duncan, drummer David Friedrich and bassist Axel One. Former members include, guitarists Daniel Güldener, Jan Marco Heinz, and Christian Kisseler, bassist Stanislaw Czywill, and drummer Joakim Stephan Möller. Their musical style consists of metalcore and post-hardcore, with influences of nu metal, industrial metal, and gothic metal.

== History ==
=== Formation and Ghøstkid (2020–2021) ===
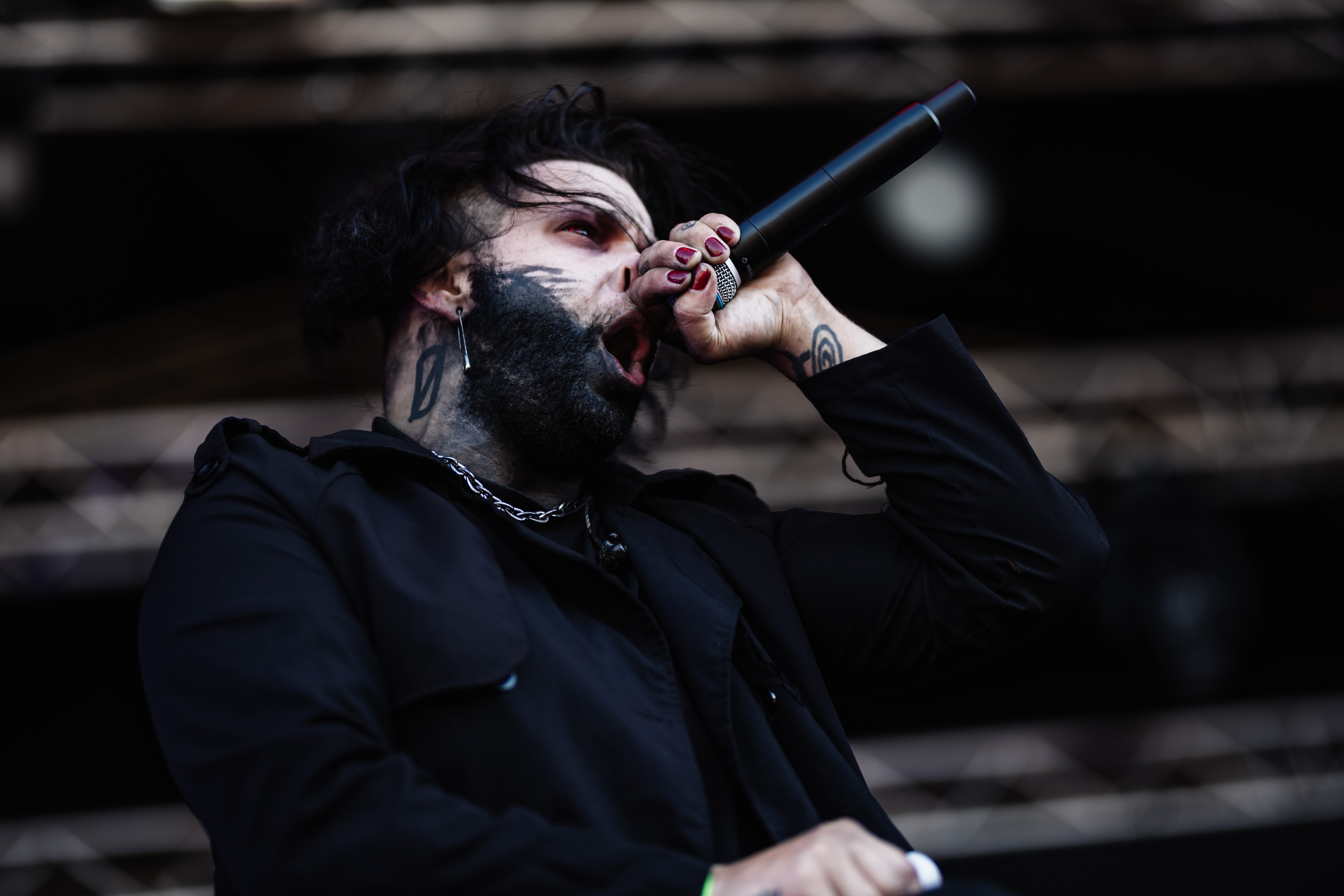
Biesler performing with the band in 2022

Vocalist Sebastian Biesler co-founded Electric Callboy (then known as Eskimo Callboy) in 2010, recording five studio albums with band before Biesler announced his departure from the band in February 2020. He soon after announced his new project Ghostkid, formed with former members of To the Rats and Wolves.

In November 2020, Ghostkid released their self-titled debut album, GHØSTKID, produced by Sky van Hoff. The band was scheduled to go on tour in support of the album in April 2021; however, due to the COVID-19 pandemic, the tour was pushed back to December of that year. Additional tour dates were announced in May.

=== Hollywood Suicide and line-up change (2022–2026) ===
Concluding the touring cycle of their debut album, Ghostkid released their second studio album, Hollywood Suicide in 2024. It was also announced the band would be supporting Blind Channel on tour.

In May 2026, vocalist Sebastian Biesler announced members Stanislaw Czywill, Jan Marco Heinz, Joakim Stephan Möller, and Christian Kisseler have parted ways with the band, leaving Biesler the sole remaining member.

=== Follow the White Rabbit (2026–present) ===
In June 2026, frontman Sebastian Biesler announced a new chapter for Ghostkid via his Instagram account. The new album, "Follow the White Rabbit", was announced with a release date of October 2nd, 2026. The first single “Ivory” was released on July 31st, 2026 alongside an accompanying music video. In keeping with the album's title, the new band members were concealed behind white rabbit masks during the video. Their identities were officially revealed in the video for the second single, "I Destroyed You", released on August 27th, 2026. The new members are

- Iain Duncan (guitars)
- David Friedrich (drums)
- Axel One (bass)

In September 2026, the European tour originally scheduled for October, was postponed until April 2027. Sebastian Biesler explained the decision by personal challenges and the need to prioritize his mental health and take time for further recovery. However, the Christmas concert scheduled to take place in Cologne on December 19, 2026, is still set to go ahead.

== Musical style and influences ==
Vocalist Sebastian Biesler explained some of his influences consists of Marilyn Manson, Fever 333, and Bring Me the Horizon. He combined this inspiration with gloom, aggressiveness, snootiness with pop affinity, as well as influences from nu metal, trap, industrial metal.

== Band members ==
Current

- Sebastian "Sushi" Biesler – lead vocals, guitars, bass (2020–present)
- Iain Duncan - guitars (2026-present)
- David Friedrich - drums (2026-present)
- Axel One - bass (2026-present)

Former

- Daniel "Danny" Güldener – guitars (2020)
- Stanislaw "Stanni" Czywill – bass (2020–2026)
- Jan Marco "Jappo" Heinz – guitars, backing vocals (2020–2026)
- Joakim Stephan "Steve" Möller – drums, percussion (2020–2026)
- Christian "Chris" Kisseler – guitars (2021–2026)

== Discography ==
Studio albums

- Ghøstkid (2020)
- Hollywood Suicide (2024)
- Follow the White Rabbit (2026)

Singles

- "Start a Fight" (2020)
- "Supernova" (featuring Marcus Bischoff of Heaven Shall Burn) (2020)
- "This Is Not Hollywood" (featuring Johnny 3 Tears of Hollywood Undead) (2020)
- "This Is Not Hollywood" (featuring Timi Hendrix) (2020)
- "You & I" (2020)
- "Fool" (2021)
- "Ugly" (2022)
- "The Sickness" (featuring Kayzo) (2022)
- "Hollywood Suicide" (2023)
- "Heavy Rain" (2023)
- "FSU" (2024)
- "Murder" (featuring Code: Pandorum) (2024)
- "Ivory" (2026)
- "I Destroyed You" (2026)

== Awards and nominations ==
Impericon Awards

Year	Nominee / work	Award	Result	Ref.
2020	Ghostkid	Best Newcomer	Won	

Berlin Music Video Awards

Year	Nominee / work	Award	Result	Ref.
2021	"Supernova"	Best Music Video	Nominated	

Heavy Music Awards

Year	Nominee / work	Award	Result	Ref.
2021	Ghostkid	Best International Breakout Band	Nominated	
