= Julia Büchler =

German television presenter, radio reporter and journalist

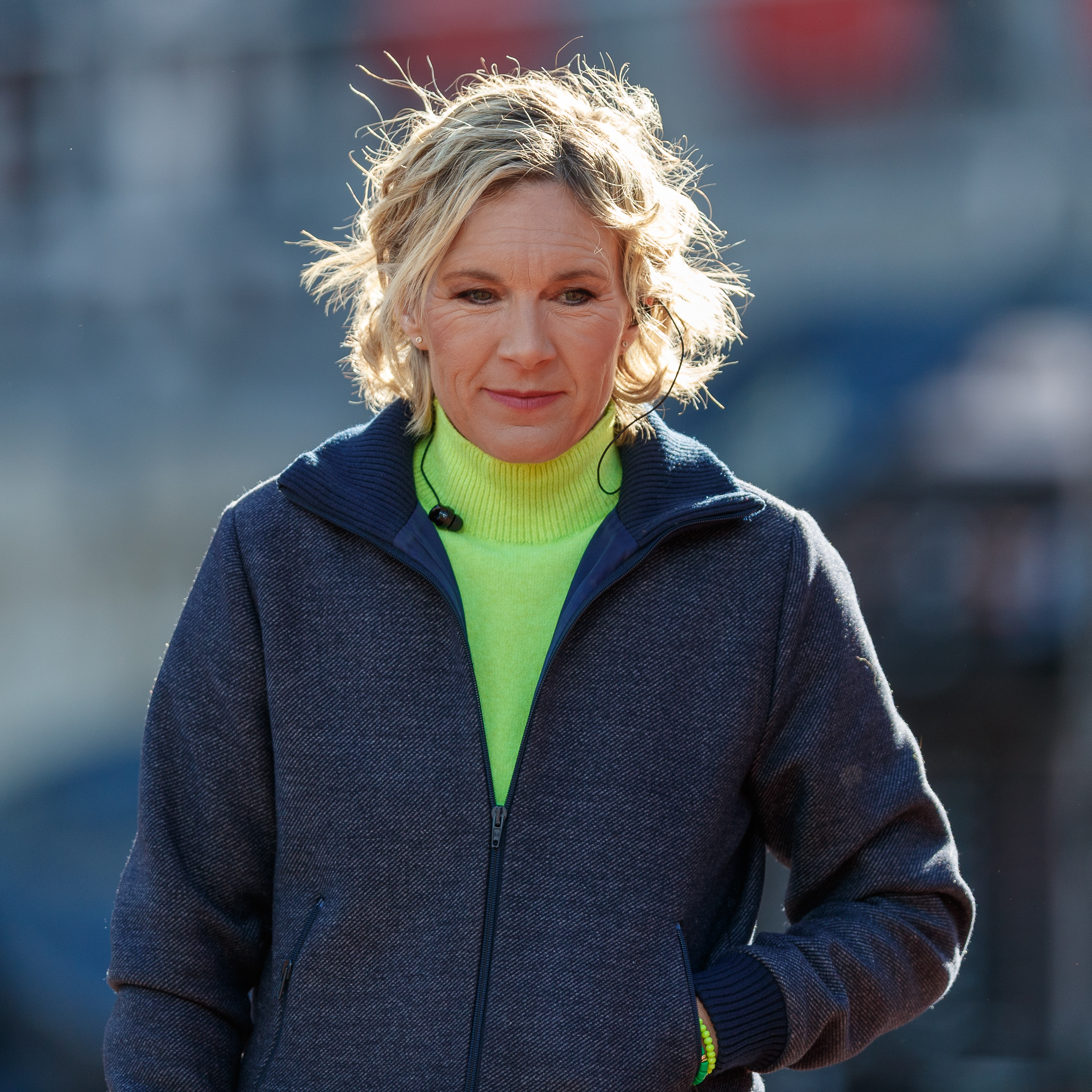
- Born: 11 February 1973 (age 53); Erlangen, Bavaria, Germany
- Occupations: Television presenter, radio reporter and journalist

Julia Büchler (born 11 February 1973 in Erlangen) is a German television presenter, radio reporter and journalist.

== Biography ==
Büchler grew up in Erlangen. After graduating from high school, she worked for Franken Funk- und Fernsehen. She then studied sports economics at the University of Bayreuth and went to San Francisco, California, for a year. During her studies, Büchler worked as a news editor at Radio Energy.

== Journalism career ==
In 2000, she began working in the current editorial department of Bayerischer Rundfunk as an author for television and radio. She also presented the news on Bayern 1 and has been working as an ARD radio story writer for the Germany national football team since 2006. She is a regular interviewer at major events (World Cup, European Championship) and also in the Bundesliga.

Since October 2016, Büchler has been part of the team of sports presenters in the ARD Tagesthemen. On BR television, Büchler presents the sports events and the magazine Blickpunkt Sport Bayern in the Rundschau. Since 2013, she is presenter of the Frankenschau aktuell. In 2016 and 2018, she hosted the opening of the Nuremberg Christmas Market for the Abendschau in BR Fernsehen with Roman Roell. At the Fastnacht in Franken festival, she presents live from the red carpet.

Since December 2017, she has also been a presenter for cross-country skiing in the ARD Sportschau in winter. At the Freestyle and Snowboard World Championships 2019 in Park City, Utah, she was on site as presenter for the Sportschau.

Julia Büchler is married to the sports presenter Philipp Eger, and has four children.
