= To the Rats and Wolves =

German electronicore band

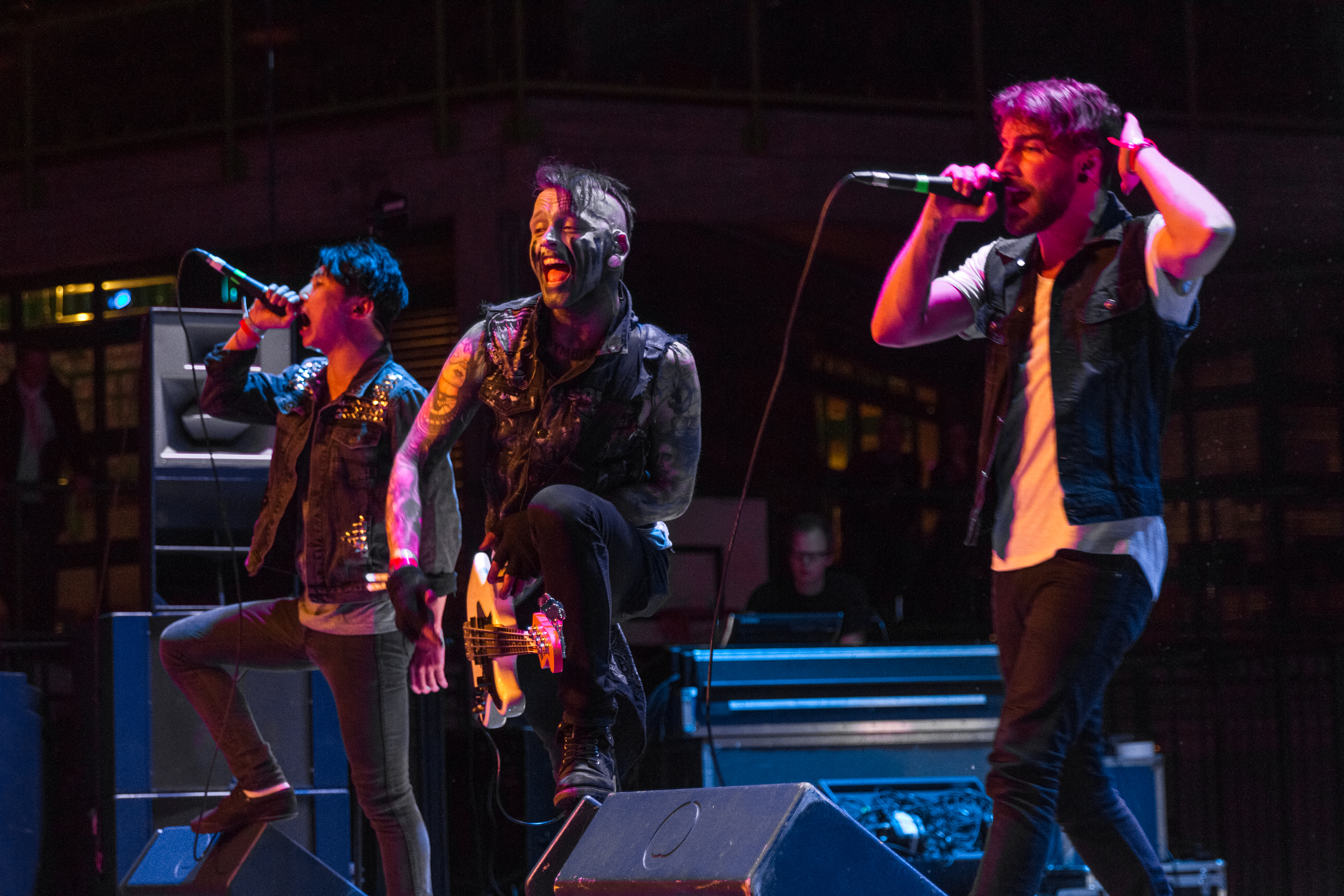
- To the Rats and Wolves performing at the Schüler Rockfestival in 2015

Background information
- Origin: Essen, North Rhine-Westphalia, Germany
- Genres: Post-hardcore; metalcore; electronicore
- Years active: 2012–2020
- Labels: Arising Empire
- Past members: Dixi Wu; Nico Sallach; Danny Guldener; Marc Dobruk; Stanislaw Czywil; Simon Yildirim; Tobias Lotze

To the Rats and Wolves was a German electronicore band from Essen, North Rhine-Westphalia first formed in 2012 until they split up in 2020.

== History ==
The band, founded in 2012, emerged from the last line-up of the disbanded deathcore band Beast War Returns and released their first EP "Young.Used.Wasted", produced by Electric Callboy guitarist Daniel Haniß. The band was formed with two singers, Dixi Wu and Nico Sallach, two guitarists Danny Güldener and Marc Dobruk, bassist Stanislaw Czywil, and drummer Simon Yildirim. Before joining To the Rats and Wolves, Yildirim was active as a drummer for We Set the Sun, which was signed to Redfield Records. In March 2014, the band toured Europe as the opening act for Her Bright Skies, Iwrestledabearonce, and Electric Callboy. This was followed by appearances at the Mair1 Festival, Bochum Total and Olgas Rock, and then went on tour in Germany again in the Fall as the support band for Electric Callboy.

In January 2015, To the Rats and Wolves was booked for the Summer Breeze Open Air festival in Dinkelsbühl, Bavaria and performed in August of that year. In October 2015, the band started as the opening act for We Butter the Bread with Butter on the Wieder Geil Tour, the first concert of which took place in Dresden, Saxony. After 16 shows, the tour concluded in December of that year in Hamburg. During that time in November, the band signed with Arising Empire.

In 2016, To the Rats and Wolves released two albums, "Neverland" in February and "Dethroned" in September. In 2019, around time of the released of their third and final album, Cheap Love, the band announced on social media that they would disband in 2020. A farewell tour took place in January 2020 in four German cities. Singer Nico Sallach later joined as the clean vocalist for Electric Callboy, replacing Sebastian "Sushi" Biesler in the line-up.

== Discography ==
Album

- Neverland (2016)
- Dethroned (2016)
- Cheap Love (2019)

EP

- Young.Used.Wasted. (2013)
