= Kevin Ratajczak =

German singer (born 1985)

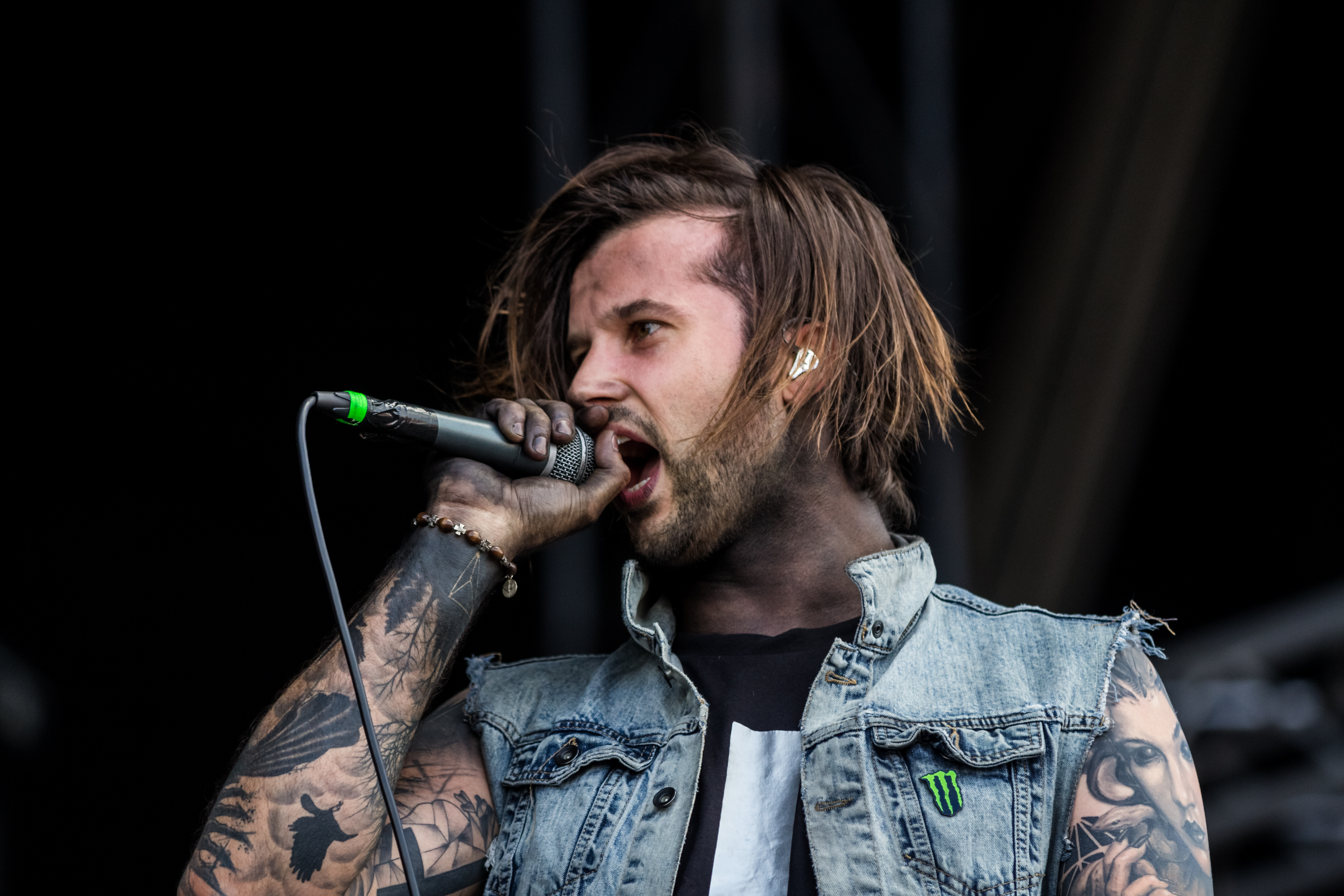
- Ratajczak performing in August 2016

Background information
- Born: 7 August 1985 (age 40); Datteln, Germany
- Genres: Electronicore; metalcore; melodic metalcore; post-hardcore; EDM
- Occupations: Singer; musician; songwriter
- Instruments: Vocals; keyboards
- Member of: Electric Callboy

Kevin Ratajczak (born 7 August 1985) is a German singer. He is a founding member and the primary lyricist of the electronicore band Electric Callboy, for which he provides the "unclean" vocals (growling and screaming) alongside "clean" vocalist Nico Sallach.

== Early life ==
Ratajczak was born in Datteln on 7 August 1985. He is of Polish descent. As a child, his first experience with harder music came from listening to his father's Deep Purple albums. He would also later cite Brendon Urie of Panic! at the Disco as a vocal role model, as well as revealing that seeing Slipknot at the Grugahalle when he was 18 was his favourite concert.

== Career ==
In 2010, Ratajczak became a founding member of Electric Callboy, providing its "harsh" vocals (growling and screaming) alongside "lead" vocalist (providing both screaming and singing) Sebastian "Sushi" Biesler, lead guitarist Daniel "Danskimo" Haniß, bassist Daniel Klossek, drummer Michael Malitzki, and rhythm guitarist Pascal Schillo. Biesler left the band in 2020 and was replaced by Nico Sallach on clean vocals. Ratajczak and Sallach write most of the band's lyrics. They submitted their song "Pump It" to represent Germany as a wildcard selection in the 2022 Eurovision Song Contest, but it was ultimately denied.

== Personal life ==
Ratajczak is married and has two children.
