= Finch (rapper) =

German rapper

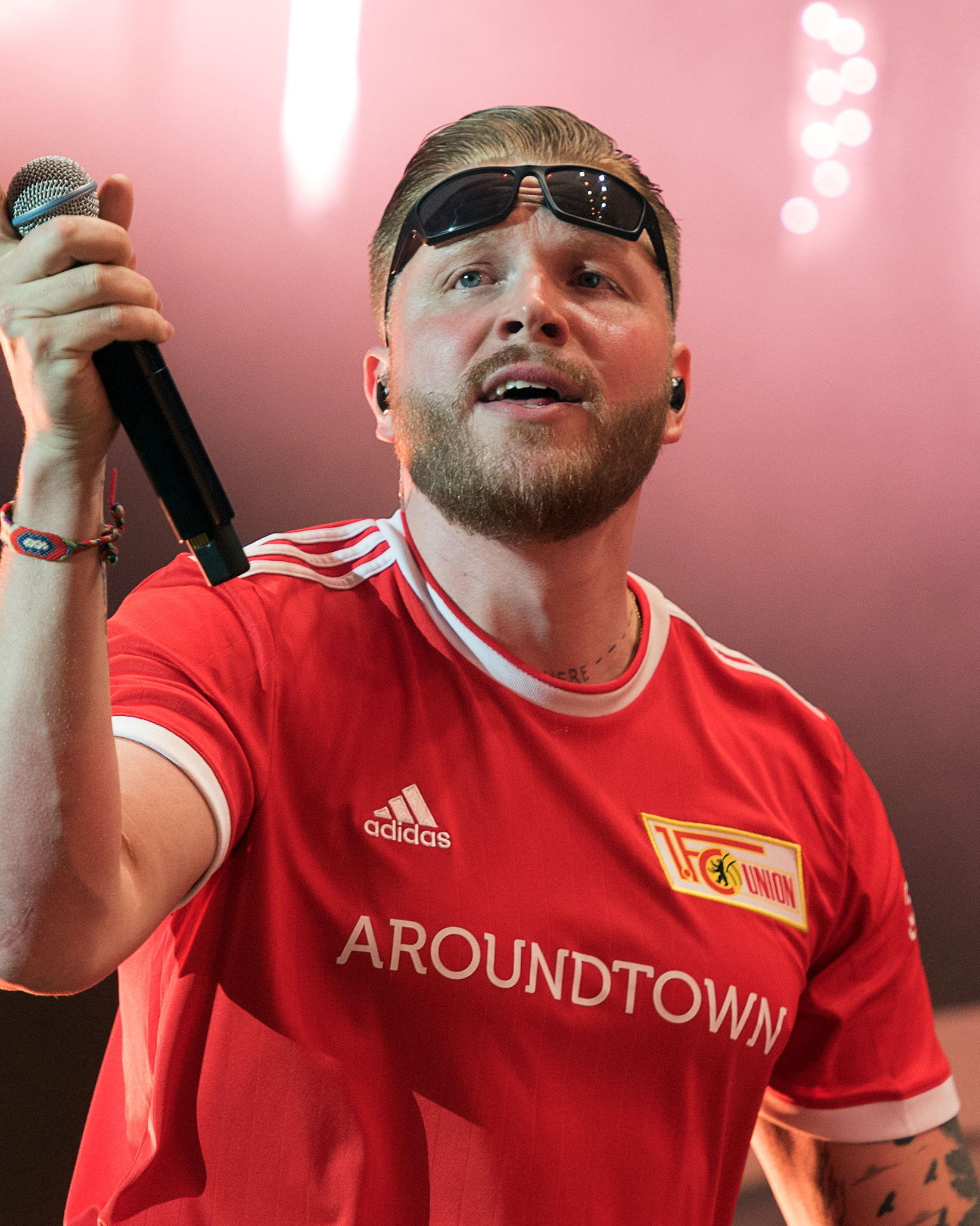
- Wehowsky performing in 2023

Background information
- Born: 13 April 1990 (age 36); Frankfurt (Oder), East Germany
- Origin: Lichtenberg, Berlin, Germany
- Genres: Hip hop; battle rap; rave
- Occupations: Rapper; singer; streamer; YouTuber
- Years active: 2014–present

Nils Wehowsky (born 13 April 1990), better known by his stage name Finch, formerly Finch Asozial (stylized as FiNCH and FiNCH ASOZiAL), is a German rapper, Twitch streamer, YouTuber and battle rapper.

== Early life and education ==
Wehowsky was born in Frankfurt (Oder), East Germany, on 13 April 1990 and grew up in the nearby town of Fürstenwalde. He did an apprenticeship in mechanics and worked for five years in the private sector, after which he studied electrical engineering. He moved to work in the Lichtenberg borough of Berlin in 2013.

== Career ==
Wehowsky first came to prominence on the German battle rap show Rap am Mittwoch. He began regularly uploading his songs to his Youtube channel in 2014 and released his debut single Ostdeutscher Hasselhoff in August 2016. This was followed in August 2018 by his EP Fliesentisch Romantik. In July 2018, he took part in a battle rap with rapper Clep on the TopTierTakeover YouTube channel. Their video gained over a million views. He released his single Departure in December 2018 and within two weeks it had reached number 63 on the German single charts. This was his first song to enter the charts and its music video has over 20 million views on Youtube. His first studio album Dorfdisko was released on 8 March 2019 and quickly reached number 2 on the German album charts. On 14 February 2020 his second album Finchi's Love Tape was released, which had also reached number 2 on the charts. He started his Twitch channel sweetfinchiboy90 in 2020, on which he regularly streams video games.

In May 2021 he announced, via his Instagram profile, that he would henceforth only perform under the stage name of Finch (having previously performed as Finch Asozial). He had already renamed all of his social media channels accordingly and released his April 2021 single Keine bösen Wörter under the Finch stage name. The reason he gave for the change was that he didn't want "people to prejudice my music - without knowing me, without ever having heard my music". His third album Rummelbums was released on 17 February 2022. The album reached number one in the German album charts.

== Persona ==
Wehowsky's persona embraces his East German background; he wears "a mullet and polyester jogging suits" and uses East German culture and stereotypes favourably in his music videos. He also writes his satirical lyrics in vulgar language, characterised by nostalgia and a largely positive attitude towards modern East Germany and excessive drug use. According to Wehowsky, these aesthetics are based on 1980s East Germany.

== Discography ==
=== Studio albums ===
Year	Title	Record label	Chart position		
Year	Title	Record label	Germany	Austria	Switzerland
2019	Dorfdisko	Walk This Way Records (WMG)	2 (8 weeks)	18 (1 week)	32 (1 week)
2020	Finchi's Love Tape	Walk This Way Records (WMG)	2 (9 weeks)	18 (1 week)	17 (1 week)
2022	Rummelbums	Walk This Way Records (UMG)	1 (5 weeks)	23 (2 weeks)	9 (1 week)
2023	Dorfdisko zwei	Walk This Way Records (UMG)	1	-	-
2026	Aussenseiter Spitzenreiter	Walk This Way Records (UMG)	1 _{(2 weeks)}	-	-
