= List of metalcore bands =

Metalcore is a broad fusion genre of extreme metal and hardcore punk. Its subgenres include mathcore and melodic metalcore. This incomplete list includes bands described as performing any of these styles, including those who also perform other styles (with the exception of deathcore bands, which fuse metalcore with death metal and are listed separately).

== 0–9 ==
- 108
- 156/Silence
- 36 Crazyfists
- 7 Angels 7 Plagues

== A ==
- Abandon All Ships
- The Acacia Strain
- ACCVSED
- Across Five Aprils
- Adept
- Advent
- After the Burial
- The Afterimage
- The Agonist
- The Agony Scene
- Alazka
- Alesana
- All Out War
- All Pigs Must Die
- All That Remains
- Allt
- Alpha Wolf
- Amaranthe
- American Me
- American Standards
- The Amity Affliction
- Annisokay
- Antagonist
- Antagonist A.D.
- Any Given Day
- Architects
- Arma Angelus
- The Armed
- Arsonists Get All the Girls
- As Blood Runs Black
- As I Lay Dying
- The Ascendicate
- Asking Alexandria
- Atreyu
- Attack Attack!
- Attila
- August Burns Red
- Austrian Death Machine
- The Autumn Offering
- Avenged Sevenfold
- AVIANA
- Avralize
- Awake the Dreamer
- AxeWound

== B ==
- Bad Omens
- Balance Breach
- Beartooth
- Becoming the Archetype
- Beneath the Sky
- Betraying the Martyrs
- Better Lovers
- Between the Buried and Me
- Black Tide
- Black Veil Brides
- The Bled
- Bleed from Within
- Bleed the Sky
- Bleeding Through
- Blessed by a Broken Heart
- Blessthefall
- Bless the Fallen
- Blood Has Been Shed
- Bloodlined Calligraphy
- Bloodsimple
- Bloodywood
- Botch
- Born of Osiris
- Boundaries
- A Breach of Silence
- Bring Me the Horizon
- Broken Teeth
- The Browning
- Bullet for My Valentine
- A Bullet for Pretty Boy
- The Bunny the Bear
- Burden of a Day
- Buried in Verona
- Burnt by the Sun
- Burst
- Bury Tomorrow
- Bury Your Dead
- Butcher Babies

== C ==
- Caliban
- Callejon
- The Callous Daoboys
- Candiria
- Cane Hill
- Capture
- Carpathian
- Cataract
- Catch Your Breath
- Cave In
- Changer
- The Chariot
- Chimaira
- Chunk! No, Captain Chunk!
- Coalesce
- Code Orange
- Cold as Life
- Coldrain
- The Color Morale
- Confession
- Confessions of a Traitor
- Confide
- Conquer Divide
- Converge
- Corpus Christi
- Counterparts
- Cover Your Tracks
- The Crimson Armada
- Crossfaith
- Crown the Empire
- Cry of the Afflicted
- Cryptopsy
- Crystal Lake
- Cult Leader
- Currents

== D ==
- Damnation A.D.
- Dar Sangre
- Dark Divine
- Darkest Hour
- Darkness Divided
- Darkness Dynamite
- Dayseeker
- A Day to Remember
- Dead by April
- The Dead Rabbitts
- Deadguy
- Dead to Fall
- Death Ray Vision
- Demon Hunter
- Deny
- Design the Skyline
- Destroy the Runner
- Devil Sold His Soul
- The Devil Wears Prada
- Diecast
- The Dillinger Escape Plan
- Dir En Grey
- Disembodied
- Doch Chkae
- Dream On, Dreamer
- Drop Dead, Gorgeous
- Drowningman
- Dry Kill Logic
- Dying Wish

== E ==
- Earth Crisis
- Eighteen Visions
- Electric Callboy
- Elwood Stray
- Embodyment
- Embrace the End
- Emmure
- Employed to Serve
- Enter Shikari
- Erra
- Escape the Fate
- Eso-Charis
- The Esoteric
- Eternal Lord
- Evergreen Terrace
- Every Time I Die
- Every Knee Shall Bow
- Everyone Dies in Utah
- Extortionist
- The Eyes of a Traitor
- Eyes Set to Kill

== F ==
- Falling in Reverse
- Famous Last Words
- Fear, and Loathing in Las Vegas
- Fear Before
- Feed Her to the Sharks
- Figure Four
- Fit for a King
- Focused
- For All Eternity
- For All I Am
- For All Those Sleeping
- For the Fallen Dreams
- For Today
- Forevermore
- From a Second Story Window
- From Autumn to Ashes
- Full Blown Chaos

== G ==
- Gaza
- Get Scared
- The Ghost Inside
- Gideon
- Glamour of the Kill
- Glass Cloud
- God Complex
- God Forbid
- Goodbye to Gravity
- Graves of Valor
- The Great Commission
- Greeley Estates
- Gulch
- Gunmetal Grey
- Gwen Stacy

== H ==
- Half Me
- Hanabie.
- Haste the Day
- Hatebreed
- Hell Within
- He Is Legend
- Headwreck
- Heart in Hand
- Heaven Shall Burn
- Heavy Heavy Low Low
- Heriot
- Himsa
- Hollow Front
- The Hope Conspiracy
- Horse the Band
- House vs. Hurricane
- The Human Abstract

== I ==
- I Killed the Prom Queen
- I Prevail
- I See Stars
- I Set My Friends on Fire
- I, the Breather
- Ice Nine Kills
- Icepick
- Imminence
- In Dying Arms
- In Fear and Faith
- In Hearts Wake
- In This Moment
- Infected Rain
- Inhale Exhale
- Integrity
- Invent Animate
- Ion Dissonance
- Issues
- It Dies Today
- It Prevails
- Iwrestledabearonce

== J ==
- Jamie's Elsewhere
- Jesus Piece
- Jinjer
- Johnny Booth
- Johnny Truant

== K ==
- Killing Me Softly
- The Killing Tree
- Killswitch Engage
- Kill the Lights
- King 810
- Kingdom of Giants
- Knocked Loose
- Kublai Khan

== L ==
- Lamb of God
- Landmvrks
- Last Chance to Reason
- Letlive
- Life in Your Way
- A Life Once Lost
- Liferuiner
- Ligeia
- Light the Torch
- Like Moths to Flames
- Living Sacrifice
- Loathe
- Lorna Shore
- Lost in Hollywood
- Lotus Eater

== M ==
- Malevolence
- Make Me Famous
- Make Them Suffer
- Mastodon
- Mavis
- Maximum the Hormone
- Memphis May Fire
- Merauder
- Misery Signals
- Miss May I
- Modern Error
- Morning Again
- Most Precious Blood
- Motionless in White
- Motograter
- My Ticket Home
- MyChildren MyBride
- Myka Relocate
- Mutiny Within

== N ==
- Nasty
- Night Rider
- Nine Shrines
- No Sin Evades His Gaze
- Nora
- Norma Jean
- Northlane
- Not Enough Space
- Novelists
- The Number Twelve Looks Like You

== O ==
- Oathbreaker
- Obey the Brave
- Ocean Sleeper
- Oceans Ate Alaska
- Odd Project
- Of Mice & Men
- Of Virtue
- Oh, Sleeper
- Okilly Dokilly
- The Oklahoma Kid
- On Broken Wings
- Once Nothing
- One Morning Left
- The Ongoing Concept
- Our Hollow, Our Home
- Our Last Night
- Our Mirage
- Overcast
- Overcome
- The Overseer

== P ==
- Pain of Truth
- Palisades
- Parkway Drive
- Penknifelovelife
- Phinehas
- A Plea for Purging
- Polaris
- The Plot in You
- Poison the Well
- Prayer for Cleansing
- Protest the Hero

== R ==
- Racetraitor
- Ravenface
- RedHook
- Reflections
- Resolve
- Ringworm
- Rise to Remain
- Rising Insane
- Rolo Tomassi
- Rorschach

== S ==
- Scarlet
- Scars of Tomorrow
- Secrets
- Senses Fail
- Sea of Treachery
- SeeYouSpaceCowboy
- Shadows Fall
- Sharptooth
- Shai Hulud
- Shattered Sun
- Shoreside
- Showbread
- The Showdown
- Sikth
- Silent Civilian
- Silent Planet
- Silent Screams
- Sirens and Sailors
- Skip the Foreplay
- Sky Eats Airplane
- A Skylit Drive
- Sleeping by the Riverside
- Sleeping Giant
- Sleeping with Sirens
- Snapcase
- Society's Finest
- Sonic Syndicate
- The Sorrow
- Speed
- Spiritbox
- Spitfire
- Static Dress
- Starkweather
- Stick to Your Guns
- Still Remains
- Straight Line Stitch
- Stray from the Path
- Sunami
- Sworn In
- Sylar
- Sylosis

== T ==
- Tallah
- Tear Out the Heart
- Tetrarch
- Texas in July
- Textures
- TheCityIsOurs
- This or the Apocalypse
- Thousand Below
- Threat Signal
- Throwdown
- Thrown into Exile
- Thy Will Be Done
- Times of Grace
- To Speak of Wolves
- The Tony Danza Tapdance Extravaganza
- Training for Utopia
- Trenches
- Trivium
- Twelve Gauge Valentine
- Twelve Tribes
- Twitching Tongues

== U ==
- Underoath
- Unearth
- Until I Wake
- Upon a Burning Body
- Upon This Dawning

== V ==
- Vampires Everywhere!
- Vanna
- Varials
- Vassline
- Veil of Maya
- Vein.fm
- Vended
- VENUES
- Versus Me
- Vicious Rain
- Vision of Disorder
- Volumes

== W ==
- Wage War
- Walls of Jericho
- War from a Harlots Mouth
- War of Ages
- We Butter the Bread with Butter
- We Came as Romans
- Westfield Massacre
- While She Sleeps
- The White Noise
- Will Haven
- Windwaker
- Wind Walkers
- Within the Ruins
- Woe, Is Me
- Wolves at the Gate
- The Word Alive
- Wovenwar

== X ==
- xDeathstarx
- Xibalba

== Y ==
- Yashin
- Years Since the Storm
- Your Memorial

== Z ==
- Zao
- Zulu

== See also ==
- List of melodic metalcore bands
- List of mathcore bands
- List of deathcore bands
- List of post-hardcore bands
- List of electronicore bands
- List of djent bands
- List of industrial metal bands
- List of heavy metal bands
- List of hardcore punk bands
- List of crossover thrash bands
