= Our Hollow, Our Home =

British metalcore band

- Origin: Southampton, Hampshire, England, UK
- Genres: Metalcore; melodic metalcore
- Years active: 2013–2024
- Labels: Hollow Music; Arising Empire
- Past members: James Hackett; Gaz King; Kieran Tonks; Matt Thomason; Lawrence Welling; Bobby Brooks; Alex Raynor; Matt Tubb; Connor Hallisey; Josh White; Tobias Young; Tim Hoolahan; James Tuckey

Our Hollow, Our Home was a British metalcore band from Southampton first formed in 2013.

== History ==
=== Formation and Early Years ===
The band formed in 2013, with the initial line-up consisted of vocalist Connor Hallisey, guitarists Tobias Young and Josh White, bassist Tim Hoolahan, and drummer James Tuckey. Everyone in this line-up aside from Tuckey performed together previously in a band called Deadlines.

During the first few years of their formation, they released a 7-track EP called //Redefine in 2015, releasing 3 singles & videos.

In 2015-17, the band performed at a series of well known venues in England, including headline shows at the Joiners in Southampton, Key Club in Leeds, The Wedgewood Rooms in Portsmouth, as well as playing Redfest, Butserfest, and Takedown Festival amongst others.

The EP, combined with an intensely energetic on stage show, helped cement their reputation as 'one to watch' in the up and coming metalcore band scene, with Kerrang! detailing them in their 'local heroes' section of the magazine.

In 2017 they released 4 previously written songs titled Feast For the Crows, Throne to the Wolves, Worms Wood, and Karmadillo, before 2017 when all 4 songs appeared on their debut album Hartsick. During the time of release of these tracks, Hoolahan and Tuckey left the band, with Matt Tubb joining on bass, and Nick Taliadoros on drums.

Between 2018 and 2022, Tubb would later leave the band, initially replaced by Bobby Brooks, before Bobby left the band and Lawrence Welling joined. Taliadoros also left and was replaced by Alex Raynor.

In late March of 2017, Our Hollow, Our Home headlined a show at Venue 229 in London with Vanity Draws Blood and Sworn Amongst as special guests. In October that year, the band headlined a Halloween show with special guests Crystal Lake, Holding Absence, Shields, Lifetight, and Map Maker. Shortly afterward, Our Hollow, Our Home co-headlined a tour across the UK with Kingdom of Giants. A year later, in October of 2018, the band held a Halloween show in their native Southampton. Beforehand, they released their third album In Moment / / In Memory and the idea of the album came from guitarist and vocalist Tobias Young who spoke about his father who died from an aggressive form of lung cancer. Young stated that the moment of his life was the catalyst for the third album. In March of 2019, Our Hollow, Our Home headlined yet another show, this time at the Boston Music Room in London special guests Lock & Key, TheCityIsOurs, and The Uncharted. In September of 2019, the band released a music video to Parting Gift as an effort to provide all proceeds from digital sales to be donated to Macmillan Cancer Support. In November that year, the British metalcore quintet were among the acts for the Impericon Never Say Die! Tour with Crystal Lake and King 810.

=== COVID and Signing with Arising Empire ===
In the Spring of 2020, Our Hollow, Our Home was scheduled to headline a European and UK tour with special guests Ghost Iris, AVIANA, and TheCityIsYours but was cancelled due to the COVID-19 pandemic. In 2021, just as the COVID lockdowns were lifting, the band signed with German record label Arising Empire and released their fourth album Burn in the Flood and released a music video to the song from that album titled Remember Me with Ryo Kinoshita of Crystal Lake.

=== New Lineup, Hope & Hell, and Disbandment ===
In 2023, all members with the exception of Tobias Young decided to depart and Young was later joined with a new lineup, including unclean vocalist Gaz King, guitarist James Hackett, Matt Thomason on the bass, and drummer Kieran Tonks. The new lineup released their first single together titled Downpour. In 2024, Our Hollow, Our Home decided to call it quit but held one final show at the Loft in their hometown of Southampton. They also dropped their fifth and final album 'Hope & Hell' which was released in September that year.

== Band Members ==
=== Final Lineup ===
- Gaz King - Unclean Vocals
- Tobias Young - Guitar & Clean Vocals
- James Hackett - Guitar
- Matt Thomason - Bass
- Kieran Tonks - Drums

=== Past Members ===
- Connor Hallisey - Unclean Vocals (Original Lineup)
- Josh White - Guitar (Original Lineup)
- Lawrence Welling - Bass
- Alex Rayner - Drums
- Bobby Brooks - Bass
- Matt Tubb - Bass
- Nick Taliadoros - Drums
- Tim Hoolahan - Bass (Original Lineup)
- James Tuckey - Drums (Original Lineup)

== Discography ==
=== Albums ===
- //Redefine (2015)
- Hartsick (2017)
- In Moment / / In Memory (2019)
- Burn in the Flood (2021)
- Hope & Hell (2024)
