= Lost in Hollywood (disambiguation) =

Lost in Hollywood is a German metalcore band.

Lost in Hollywood may also refer to:

- "Lost in Hollywood", a song by Rainbow from the album Down to Earth
- "Lost in Hollywood", a song by System of a Down from the album Mezmerize
