= Blacktoothed =

German rock band

- Origin: Leipzig, Saxony, Germany
- Genres: Electropop; Metalcore; Heavy metal
- Years active: 2007–present
- Label: Arising Empire
- Members: Hendrik Rathgeber; Mathilde Keitel; David Sommer

Blacktoothed are a Leipzig-based German metal band. Although chiefly a heavy metal outfit, the band have explored multiple rock music genres to create their music.

== History ==
Blacktoothed were formed in 2007 as Black Tooth Scares and started playing hard rock. Their style is a mixture of 1980s hard rock, modern metal, and American pop. The band currently consist of frontman and lead vocalist Hendrik Rathgeber, guitarist and backing vocalist Mathilde "Matti" Keitel, and drummer David Sommer. Rathgeber learned how to perform through his mother, who was a music teacher, and his brother, who was also a musician.

Blacktoothed's first album, titled Seeker, was released in 2018. The band signed with German record label Arising Empire around 2022, with which they released their second album, Juli, on July 29, 2022. Upon release of the new album, they released a music video for the song "You Never Know", which was produced by Annisokay guitarist and frontman Christophe Wieczorek and Julian Breucker at Sawdust Recordings. They then performed at the Impericon Festival alongside bands Annisokay, Hands Like Houses, Bad Omens, Polaris, Thundermother, Acres, and many others. In 2023, they released a song titled "Carried Away", with a video again produced by Wieczorek. They released their third studio album, Headway, on January 24, 2025.

== Band members ==
- Hendrik Rathgeber - lead vocals
- Mathilde Keitel - guitar, backing vocals
- David Sommer - drums

== Discography ==
Albums

- Seeker (2018)
- Juli (2022)
- Headway (2025)

EPs

- Antidote (2024)
