= Breathe Atlantis =

German alternative rock band

- Origin: Essen, North Rhine-Westphalia, Germany
- Genres: alternative rock; post-hardcore
- Years active: 2012-2023
- Labels: Redfield; Arising Empire
- Past members: Nico Schiesewitz; Lasse Weigang; Jan Euler; Silas Fischer; Markus Harazim; Joschka Basteck

Breathe Atlantis was a German alternative rock band based out of Essen, North Rhine-Westphalia formed in 2012 until their dissolvement in 2023.

== History ==
Breathe Atlantis was formed in 2012 in the North Rhine-Westphalian city of Essen. The band consisted of lead vocalist Nico Schiesewitz, guitarist Joschka Bastek, bassist Jan Euler, and drummer Markus Harazim. In 2014, Breathe Atlantis released their debut album Shorelines, which the group financed out of their own pocket and released without a record company. Afterwards, Breathe Atlantis was signed by Redfield Records and released their second album Futurestories on the label in 2016. In 2017, the band played two tours with Any Given Day, To the Rats and Wolves, and Vitja in Germany and Switzerland. The group also played as the support act for bands like Memphis May Fire, Attila, Bury Tomorrow, Betraying the Martyrs, The Word Alive, Caliban, Hands Like Houses, Slaves, and Callejon. The band then joined with Our Mirage as the opening act for the European tour of the Swedish band Imminence, which took place in December of 2018 throughout Europe. The same year, Breathe Atlantis signed with Arising Empire and released their third album Soulmade on the record label in early 2019. In August of 2019, Breathe Atlantis joined Of Mice & Men on tour with Japanese band Crossfaith headlining the shows. In 2022, Breathe Atlantis released a video for the song "Changes" featuring Nico Sallach of Electric Callboy. That same year, Breathe Atlantis released their final album, Overdrive, and disbanded in 2023.

== Discography ==
Albums

- Shorelines (2014)
- Futurestories (2016)
- Soulmade (2019)
- Overdrive (2022)
