= Polar (band) =

English punk band

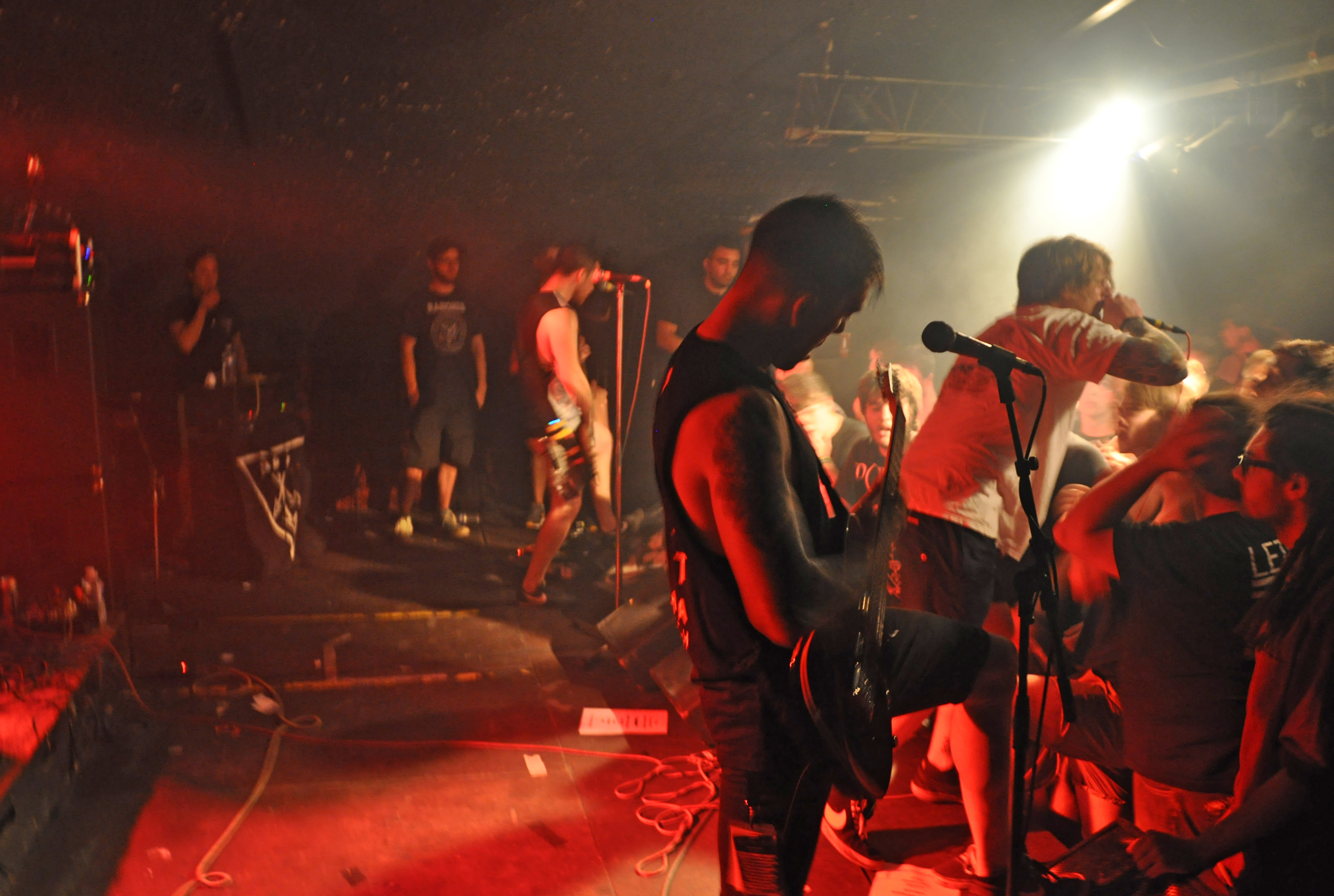
- Polar playing at the Summerblast in Trier, Germany

Background information
- Origin: Guildford, Surrey, England, UK
- Genres: hardcore punk
- Years active: 2009–present
- Labels: Wolf at Your Door Records; In at the Deep End Records; Prosthetic Records; Arising Empire
- Members: Adam Woodford; Bruno Consani; Simon Richardson; Stefan Whiting; Max Flohr

Polar is an English hardcore punk band based out of Guildford, Surrey, first formed in 2009.

== History ==
The band is currently signed to German record label Arising Empire. They were previously signed to the American label Prosthetic Records. Polar is known to play typical hardcore music with some metalcore elements, since the released of their 2014 album "Shadowed by Vultures" there have been more melodic elements in their music. Frontman and vocalist Adam Woodford provides raw screams for the tracks that stand out particularly. With the album Nova released in 2019, the band's style was described as softer, but also more serious and complex. Back in 2014, Polar toured Western Europe with bands like Being as an Ocean, Hundredth and Counterparts. In 2018, Polar toured Europe once again with Being as an Ocean, Northlane, Alazka, Casey, Currents, and Thousand Below on the Impericon Never Say Die! Tour. In 2019, Polar toured Germany after the release of their fourth studio album "Nova". They received support from the band Tripsitter, among others, who presented their debut album "The Other Side of Sadness", which was also released in April. After almost four years of silence, the band released their fifth album "Everywhere, Everything" in early 2023 under the label Arising Empire.

== Style ==
Polar plays a melodic variant of hardcore punk, in which was described on their 2012 debut album "Iron Lungs" as rough and chaotic. The second album is influenced by old-school hardcore and is reminiscent of hardcore bands such as Gorilla Biscuits and American Nightmare, although the melodic vocals in the song "Before the Storm" penetrate into the spheres of post-hardcore. On the third album "No Cure, No Savior", Polar deal with issues such as homelessness. Already on this album the band turned more towards the metalcore vibe. On their fourth album "Nova", released in 2019, the bands increasingly turned to the metal scene and their characteristics were incorporated into their music. The combination of their sound is located somewhere between bands like Parkway Drive, While She Sleeps, and Devil Sold His Soul. Since the release of their fourth album, there were no changes on "Everything, Everywhere", released in 2023.

== Discography ==
Albums

- 2012: Iron Lungs (Wolf at Your Door Records)
- 2014: Shadowed by Vultures (In at the Deep End Records)
- 2016: No Cure, No Savior (Prosthetic Records)
- 2019: Nova (Arising Empire)
- 2023: Everywhere, Everything (Arising Empire)
- 2024: Five Arrows (Arising Empire)

EPs

- 2010: This Polar Noise (Wolf at Your Door Records)
- 2013: Inspire Create Destroy (In at the Deep End Records)
