= Engst =

Engst is a surname. Notable people with the surname include:

- Adam C. Engst (born 1967), American technology writer and publisher
- Erwin Engst (1918–2003), American advisor to the People's Republic of China

== See also ==
- Engst (band), German punk band
