= Alleviate (band) =

German post-hardcore band

- Origin: Germany
- Genres: Post-hardcore; metalcore
- Years active: 2020–present
- Labels: Arising Empire
- Members: Timo Bonner; Marius Wedler; Ramon Kluft; Marc Baker; Yunus Proch

Alleviate is a post-hardcore band and side project consisting of members from separate bands formed in Germany formed in 2020.

== History ==
Alleviate was started at the height of COVID-19 consisting mostly of German bands members, clean vocalist Timo Bonner of Our Mirage, unclean vocalist Marius Wedler of Breakdown at Tiffany's, guitarist Marc Baker of We are Perspectives, drummer Yunus Proch of Time, The Valuator, and the only non-German member, guitarist Ramon Kluft of the Dutch progressive metalcore band The Evolutionist. The project was created when Timo Bonner and Ramon Kluft were goofing around and playing on their PS5 and wrote a song as a fun side-project. In 2021, all five members released their first single together titled "Die For Me". That same year, drop yet another single titled "Broken". The song was recorded at Mega Blaster Recordings and the music video was produced by Mirko Witzki. The point of the song was designed to overcome depression as the band pointed out.

In August of 2024, Alleviate released their first album "DMNS". The reviews were far from perfect but shows to be a strong album. The album consisted of 10 songs, including the 2021 songs "Die For Me" and "Broken".

== Band Members ==
- Timo Bonner (Our Mirage) - clean vocals
- Marius Wedler (Breakdown at Tiffany's) - unclean vocals
- Ramon Kluft (The Evolutionist) - guitar
- Marc Baker (We are Perspectives) - guitar
- Yunus Proch (Time, the Valuator) - drums
