= Arising Empire =

German record label

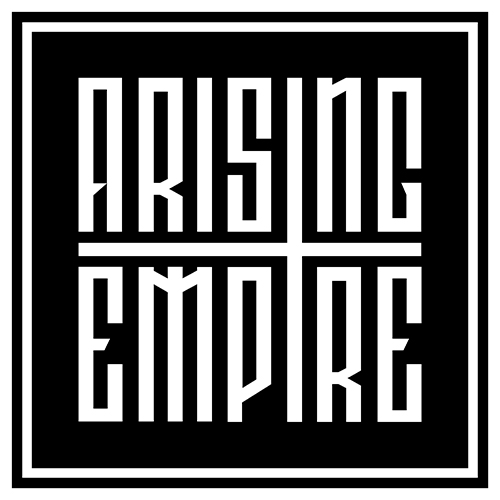
- Parent company: Kontor Records
- Founded: 2015
- Founder: Markus Staiger, Tobbe Falarz
- Status: Active
- Distributors: Kontor Records (current); Warner Music Group (former)
- Genre: Punk; rock; metalcore
- Country of origin: Germany
- Location: Donzdorf, Baden-Württemberg
- Official website: arising-empire.com

Arising Empire is a German independent record label that focuses primarily on punk, rock, alternative, post-hardcore, and all forms and subsidiaries of metalcore music. It was first established in 2015 in Donzdorf, Baden-Württemberg.

== History ==
Arising Empire was founded in 2015 by Nuclear Blast owner Markus Staiger and former "People Like You Records" manager Tobbe Falarz. It was, besides the former subsidiary company SharpTone Records, which was founded shortly after Arising Empire, a sub-label of Nuclear Blast. The distribution was taken on by Warner Music at the time. Most of the bands who were and still are signed to the label hail from Central Europe, Germany in particular, while some bands like Imminence, Royal Republic, and Aviana that hailed from Sweden, Novelists, and Landmvrks originally of France, as well as For the Fallen Dreams and Lionheart who hail from the United States, and One Morning Left of Finland.

The first set of bands signed by the label were Amor, Imminence, Novelists, and GWLT. The first release of the label was the album Souvenirs from the French progressive metalcore band Novelists, on 11 November 2015.

On June 22, 2020, during the height of COVID, Arising Empire was acquired by fellow German label Kontor Records, a subsidiary of the German-based media company Edel Music AG.

== Current artists ==
- (Germany) Accvsed
- (Germany) Alleviate
- (Germany) Annisokay
- (Germany) Any Given Day
- (Sweden) Aviana
- (Germany) Avralize
- (Sweden) Awake the Dreamer
- (Australia) Banks Arcade
- (Germany) Blacktoothed
- (Norway) Blood Command
- (Germany) The Butcher Sisters
- (United States) The Dark.FM
- (Germany) Defocus
- (Germany) Doomcrusher
- (Germany) Emil Bulls
- (Germany) Engst
- (Sweden) Eyes Wide Open
- (Germany) Floya
- (United States) For the Fallen Dreams
- (Germany) From Fall to Spring
- (Canada) Get the Shot
- (Germany) Half Me
- (United Kingdom) Heart of a Coward
- (Italy) Hopsydian
- (Belgium) Ice Sealed Eyes
- (France) Kadinja (Hiatus)
- (France) Landmvrks
- (United States) Lionheart
- (Germany) Lost in Hollywood
- (Germany) Madsen
- (Germany) Mavis
- (Germany) Neovise
- (United States) Of Virtue
- (Germany) The Oklahoma Kid
- (Germany) Our Mirage
- (Germany) PLUME
- (United Kingdom) Polar
- (France) Resolve
- (France) Revnoir
- (Japan) Sable Hills
- (United Kingdom) TheCityIsOurs
- (Germany) Throatcut
- (Sweden) Thrown
- (Scotland) To Kill Achilles
- (Sweden) Tungsten
- (Canada) The Veer Union
- (Germany) VENUES
- (Germany) Vianova
- (Switzerland) Vicious Rain

== Former artists ==
Active

- (United States) Amor (No Clear Info)
- (United States) Cro-Mags
- (Germany) Future Palace
- (Germany) GWLT
- (Sweden) Imminence
- (Japan) Lovebites
- (France) Novelists
- (United Kingdom) Peter and the Test Tube Babies
- (Sweden) Royal Republic
- (Belgium) Spoil Engine
- (United Kingdom) While She Sleeps

Disbanded

- (Germany) Alazka
- (Germany) Breathe Atlantis
- (Finland) One Morning Left
- (United Kingdom) Our Hollow, Our Home
- (Netherlands) The Charm the Fury
- (Germany) To the Rats and Wolves
- (Germany) Vitja
