= Mavis (band) =

German metalcore band

- Origin: Stuttgart, Baden-Württemberg, Germany
- Genres: metalcore
- Years active: 2019–present
- Labels: Arising Empire
- Members: Phil Donay; Manuel Weller; Mo Amrein; Jakob Schulz-Klein
- Past members: Robin Dachtler; Mike Uhland; Johannes Rupp
- Website: mavisband.com

Mavis (stylized as MAVIS) is a German metalcore band from Stuttgart first formed in 2019. The band has been signed to Arising Empire since August of 2023.

== History ==
Mavis was founded in 2019 by Robin Dachtler, Phil Donay, Mike Uhland, Mo Amrein, and Johannes Rupp in Stuttgart. In November that same year, the band released their debut single, "Insight", along with a music video. Shortly after, the second single, "Monsters", was dropped in February of 2020, which including a music video. Later in April, the EP "Shades" was released shortly afterwards. Aside from the 2 previous tracks first released, a third track titled "Reflections" was listed in the EP. The band's first songs already caused a stir and received positive feedback from the music press.

At the beginning of the COVID-19 pandemic in Germany and the lockdowns which resulted in the ban on performances, MAVIS initially played online concerts. As the pandemic progressed, several members left the group. After a fire in the rehearsal room in 2022, which destroyed all of the musicians' equipment, and further departures, the group was on the verge of collapse. Months later, a new lineup was introduced, averting the band's dissolution.

In August 2023, a year down the road, the band announced their signing with German independent label Arising Empire. In collaboration with their new label, MAVIS released the song "Tortured Land" along with a music video. Two more singles were dropped October and November, both titled "Furry Tongue" and "Calypso", each of which was also released with a music video. On 15 December 2023, the band released their debut album titled "Grief is No Ally". A music video for the song "Limerent" was released to coincide with the album's release, featuring VENUES singer Lela Gruber as a guest vocalist.

In mid-2024, the band performed at the 25th Annual Summer Breeze Open Air Festival.

In November 2024, "DNA", the next single for "Grief is No Ally", was released along with a music video.

== Style ==
The band plays modern metalcore and is also characterized as progressive metal. Characteristic are the low-tuned guitar riffs, which vary between complex lines using more sophisticated playing techniques and simple, deep breakdowns typical of metalcore. These are accompanied by alternating, often "hardcore-like" shouts and catchy clean vocals. Other key elements of the music are the use of synthesizers and atmospheric sounds, as well as the use of pop song sequences as the formal framework of the songs. The lyrics deal with themes such as self-confidence, trust and love, but also disappointment and doubt.

== Discography ==
Album

- Grief is No Ally (2023)

EPs

- Shades (2020)

Singles

- Insight (2019)
- Monsters (2019)
- Tortured Land (2023)
- Furry Tongue (2023)
- Calypso (2023)
- DNA (2024)

== Awards ==
Top 20 Impericon Next Generation Vol. 7 (2021)
