= Vicious Rain =

Swiss metalcore band

- Origin: Baden, Switzerland
- Genres: Post-hardcore metalcore
- Years active: 2022–present
- Label: Arising Empire
- Members: David Häusermann; Mauro Gugerli; Tristan Meier; Loris De Notaristefano; Michael Teufelberger

Vicious Rain is a Swiss metalcore band from Baden, formed in 2022.

== History ==
The band was first established in 2022, consisting of lead vocalist and frontman David Häusermann, guitarist and backing vocalist Mauro Gugerli, guitarist Tristan Meier, bassist Loris De Notaristefano, and drummer Michael Teufelberger and the following year they released a string of singles, "The Devil & Lovers", "Blackout", and "Crown of Thorns". They even released a music video for the song, "The Devil & Lovers" which was directed by Mirko Witzki. In April 2024, Vicious Rain released their debut EP titled "Like a Nightmare" and dropped a video with the namesake title. In October of that year, Vicious Rain released their debut album, "There is Beauty in Letting Go". One of their tracks from the album titled "Hysteria", they recorded this song with German metalcore band and fellow Arising Empire artists Half Me.

The band released their second album, The Anatomy of Surviving, on March 13, 2026.

== Band Members ==
- David Häusermann
- Mauro Gugerli
- Tristan Meier
- Loris De Notaristefano
- Michael Teufelberger

== Discography ==
Album

- There Is Beauty in Letting Go (2024)
- The Anatomy of Surviving (2026)

EP

- Like a Nightmare (2024)
