= GWLT =

German punk band

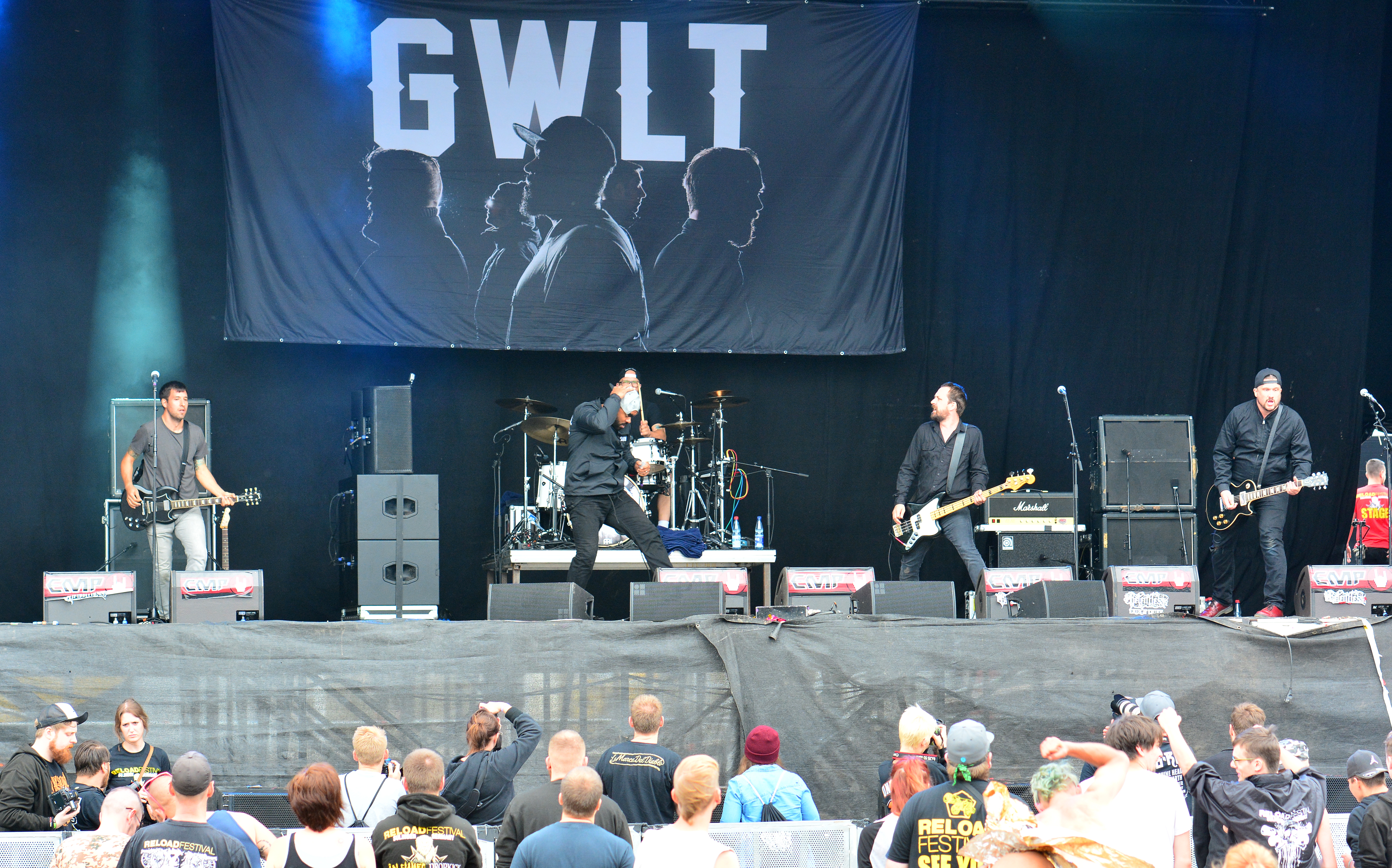
- GWLT performing at Reload Festival (2015)

Background information
- Origin: Munich, Bavaria, Germany
- Genre: hardcore punk
- Years active: 2013–present
- Labels: Acuity.Music; Cutwork Collective; Arising Empire
- Members: David Mayonga; Chris Zehetleitner; Florian Gudzent; Fabian Füss; Michael Kokus

GWLT is a German hardcore punk band based out of Munich, Bavaria first formed in 2013.

== History ==
GWLT was established in 2013 by lead vocalist David Mayonga and guitarist Chris Zehetleitner in Munich. Later, a second guitarist, Florian Gudzent, as well as bassist Michael Kokus and drummer Fabian Füss completed the quintet. Zehetleitner, Füss and Gudzent had experience in bands as they previously and respectively played for the punk bands Emil Bulls, The Blackout Argument, and The New Recruits. Frontman David Mayonga also does some MC performances under the nickname Roger Rekless. During the year of the bands establishment, GWLT released its debut EP "Ohne Anfang Ohne Ende" with three tracks on Acuity.Music, the subsidiary of the German independent record company Let It Burn Records, initially on a digital level. A physical release followed with the release of the second EP "Psychogenese in Zeiten der Apokalypse" on May 23, 2014. The two EPs, along with the EP "Wir sind keine Helden", released on October 10, 2014, are part of an EP trilogy, which was later re-released as an EP trifecta in a bundle. The physical version of all EPs was released by Cutwork Collective, another sublabel of Let It Burn Records. With the song "Frontex International", the band supported the Hardcore Help Foundation, which, among other things, pressed songs by well-known and unknown scene groups on a compilation and uses the proceeds to support social projects. The proceeds went to initial reception centers, among other things, in the wake of the refugee crisis between 2015 and 2016.

On July 13, 2015, Markus Staiger of Nuclear Blast announced the founding of a new sublabel, Arising Empire, whose first signings included GWLT, along with Imminence, Novelists, and LANDMVRKS. Before signing with new label, the band released the song "Weil wir viele sind" along with a music video. The band also started the Weil wir viele sind campaign, which is involved in social and political projects outside of music. On November 13, 2015, another EP, "Die Grundmauern der Furcht", was released, exclusively on vinyl, limited only to 1,000 copies. The debut album "Stein & Eisen" was announced at the end of 2015 and finally released on January 29, 2016 through Arising Empire. [ 4 ] The album was recorded in Kohlekeller Studios with record producer Kristian "Kohle" Kohlmannslehner. Two live shows took place in October of 2015, one at the Underground in Cologne and another at the Cassiopeia club in Berlin. Between January and March in 2016, the group played as part of the Togetherfest Tour in several German cities, as well as in Austria, Belgium, the Netherlands, and the United Kingdom. The group played as opening act for the Gorilla Biscuits, Modern Life Is War, and Touché Amoré.

== Discography ==
=== Albums ===
- Stein & Eisen (2016)

=== EPs ===
- "Ohne Anfang ohne Ende"/"Psychogenese in Zeiten der Apokalypse" (2014)
- "Wir sind keine Helden" (2015)
- Die Grundmauern der Furcht (2015)
