= The Butcher Sisters =

German beatdown hardcore band

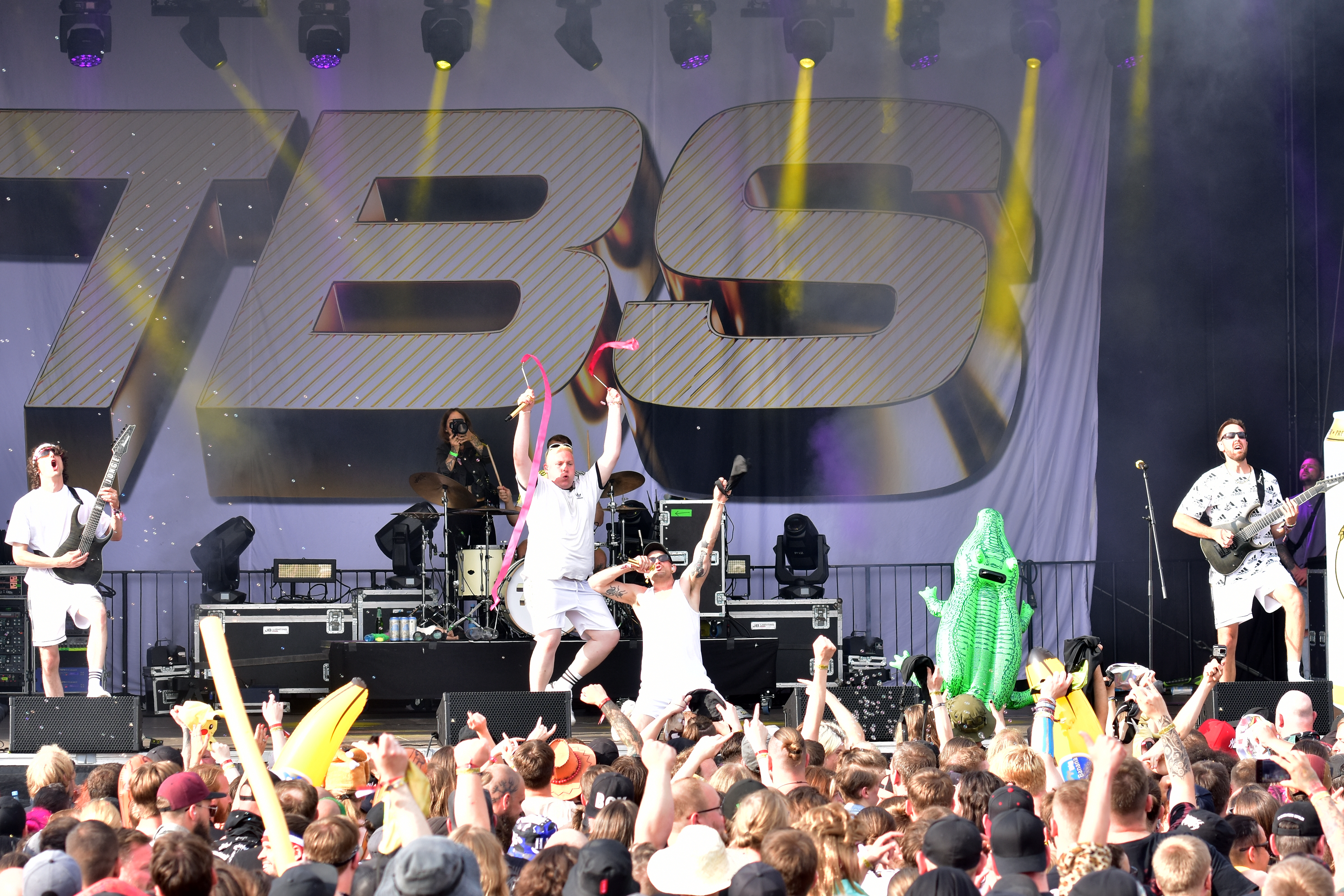
- The Butcher Sisters at the Reload Festival 2024

Background information
- Origin: Mannheim, Baden-Württemberg, Germany
- Genres: Beatdown hardcore; German hip-hop
- Years active: 2011–present
- Labels: Bleeding Nose Records; Arising Empire
- Members: Alexander Bechtel; Nicklas Stroppel; Manuel Renner; David Schneider; Bastian Gölz
- Past members: Aljosha Naarmann; Andreas Polke; Lukas Ringeisen; Raphael; Florian Toma

The Butcher Sisters (also known as TBS) are a German band formed in Mannheim, Baden-Württemberg in 2011. They are a band whose music can be classified somewhere between German rap, metal, and beatdown hardcore.

== History ==
The band was established in 2011 by guitarists David Schneider and Manuel Renner, along with vocalist and frontman Alexander Bechtel in Mannheim. In 2013, their self-titled EP was released under their own distribution. A short time later, they received a record deal with Bleeding Nose Records. The band achieved initial success and began touring nationwide.

On October 28, 2016, the band released their debut album "Respekt und Robustheit", which marked the band's breakthrough. Two years down the road, in 2018, the EP "68 Undercover" was released, which included cover versions of various artists such as Toni D, KIZ, Haftbefehl, Marteria, and Pol1Z1Stens0Hn. In 2019, their second album "Alpha & Opfah" was released. The Butcher Sisters appear as the featured artist on the song "Path of Destiny" by the German metal band Equilibrium.

In 2024, The Butcher Sisters signed a contract with Arising Empire with the release of the single "Sonnenbrille". Shortly after, they performed at Full Force, Summerbreeze, and Reload.

Their third album "Das Weiße Album" was released on January 17, 2025.

On 23 January 2026, the band released their fourth album, Das Schwarze Album. [9]

== Discography ==
Albums

- Respect and Robustness (2016)
- Alpha & Opfah (2019)
- Das Weiße Album (2025)
- Das Schwarze Album (2026)

EPs

- The Butcher Sisters (2013)
- 68 Undercover (2018)
