= Sable Hills =

Japanese metalcore band

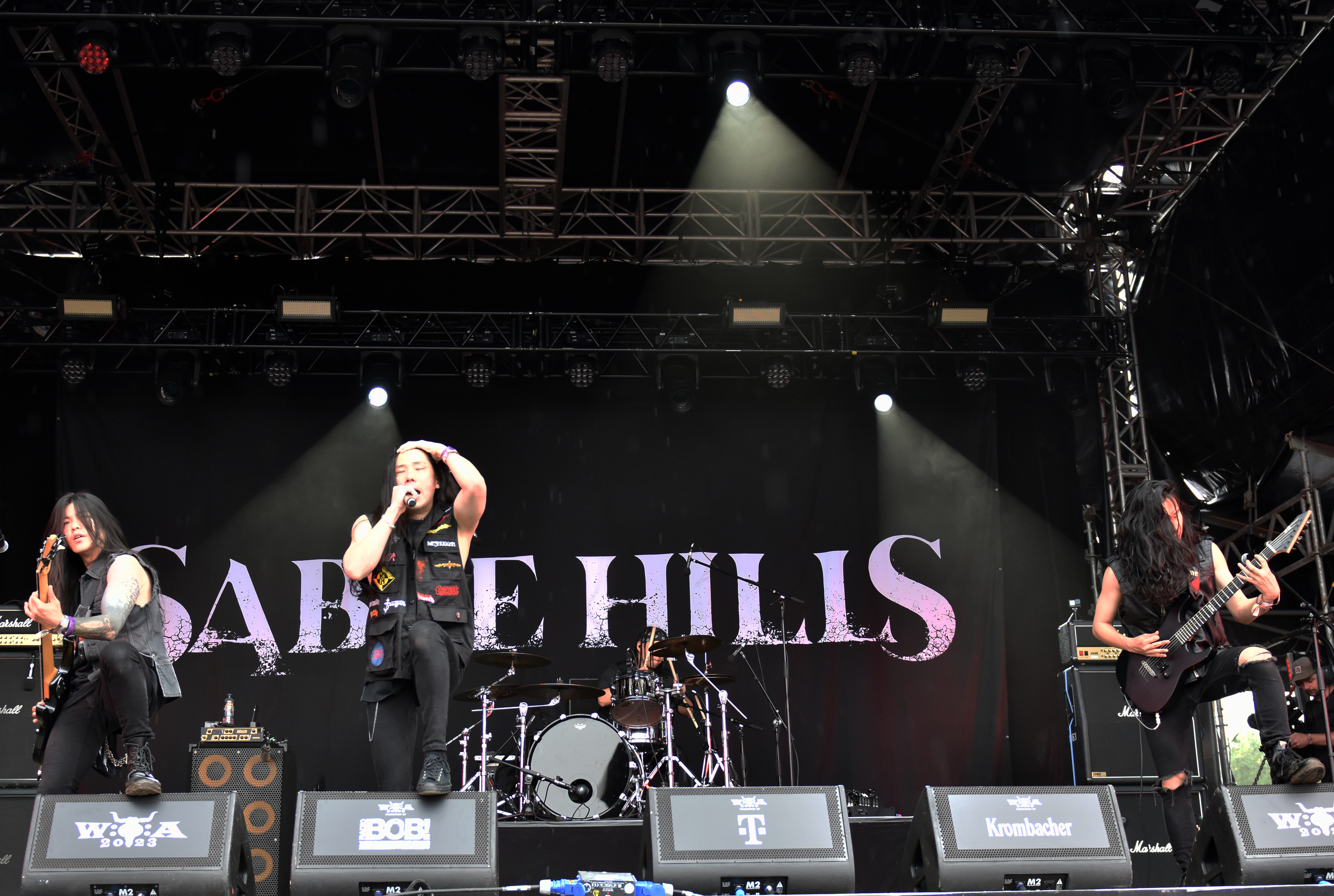
- Sable Hills performing in 2023

Background information
- Origin: Tokyo, Japan
- Genre: Metalcore
- Years active: 2015–present
- Label: Arising Empire
- Members: Takuya; Rict; Wataru; Ueda; Keita
- Website: sablehills.jp

Sable Hills is a Japanese metalcore band from Tokyo. They won first place in the 2022 Wacken Open Air metal battle competition. As of 2026, they have released three studio albums.

== History ==
Sable Hills was formed in 2015 by the brothers Takuya (vocals) and Rict (guitars). The band is complemented by bassist Ueda, drummer Keita, and second guitarist/vocalist Wataru. They have released three studio albums: Embers (2019), Duality (2022), and Odyssey (2024).

In August 2022, Sable Hills performed at Wacken Open Air, winning first place in the metal battle. The band signed with the German record label Arising Empire at the end of 2023.

== Musical style and inspirations ==
Among Sable Hills' musical influences are such metalcore bands as As I Lay Dying, Parkway Drive, Unearth, Texas in July, and Counterparts. Some sources categorize their musical style as melodic metalcore and hardcore punk.

== Band members ==
- Takuya – vocals
- Rict – guitars
- Wataru – guitars/vocals
- Ueda – bass
- Keita – drums

== Discography ==
Studio albums

- Embers (2019)
- Embers (Instrumental Edition) (2020)
- Duality (2022)
- Odyssey (2024)
- Homura (2026)

EPs

- Resurrection (2015)
- Absolute (2017)
- Elements (2017)
- Birth split with Earthists. and Graupel (2021)
