= Half Me =

German metalcore band

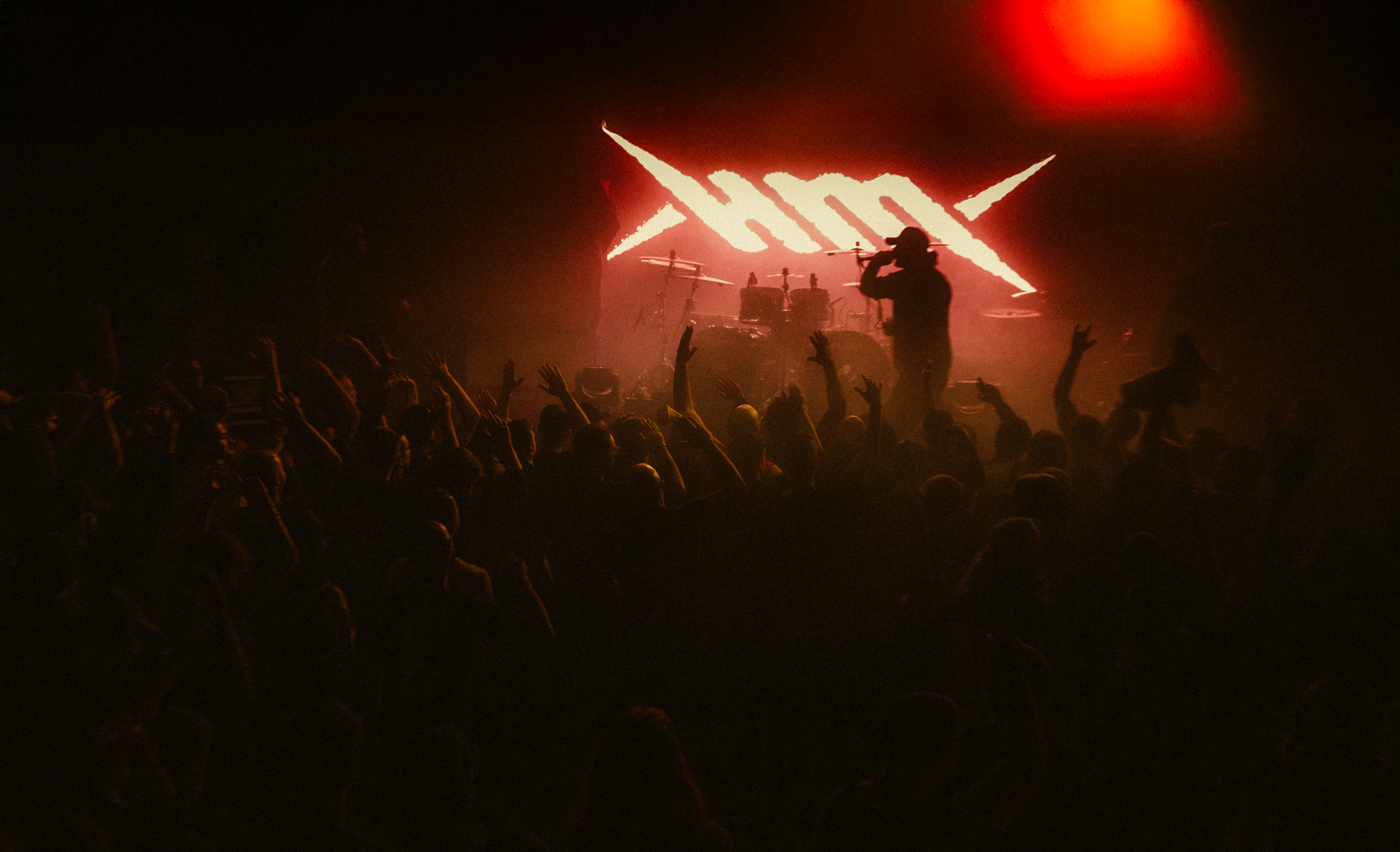
- Half Me performing in Madrid 2025

Background information
- Origin: Hamburg, Germany
- Genres: Metalcore, nu metalcore
- Years active: 2018–present
- Label: Arising Empire
- Members: Christopher Zühlke; Christopher Hesse; Tobias Max Sajons; Maximilian Eisersdorff

Half Me is a German metalcore band formed in Hamburg in 2018.

== History ==
The band was formed in 2018 and consists of four members, naming vocalist Christopher Zühlke, guitarists Christopher Hesse, bassist Tobias Max Sajons, and drummer Maximilian Eisersdorff. Three years later in 2021, they signed with German record label Arising Empire and dropped the single, "Trauma Culture". In 2023, they released their first album titled "Soma". Reviews for the debut album were considerably positive. At the end of 2023, Half Me dropped another single, "Concrete Ceiling". In May 2024, Half Me joined Cane Hill and Acres on the UK & European Tour with Resolve as the headliners. At the End of 2025, they released their EP titled "OPIUM EP". In February 2025, they joined Diesect on tour in Australia with Swedish metalcore band Thrown as the headlining act. Half Me also performed two concerts in Tokyo and Osaka at the beginning of the year. In spring 2025, they supported Upon A Burning Body, alongside Left To Suffer, King 810, and Bury My Demons on their US tour. In the summer of 2025, they played numerous festivals and supported bands such as The Ghost Inside, Landmvrks, Northlane, Whitechapel, Stray From The Path, and others. In the fall of 2025, they played a second time in the United States as support for Future Palace & Heavy Hitter. Most recently, they played as the opener for Rise Of The Northstar, alongside Get The Shot on their Neo Europe Tour.

== Band members ==
- Christopher Zühlke – vocals
- Christopher Hesse – guitar
- Tobias Max Sajons – bass
- Maximilian Eisersdorff – drums

Past members

- Julius Jansen - guitar
- Silvan Petersen - guitar

== Style ==
Half Me's musical style is predominantly classified as metalcore. The band's music is characterized by low-tuned guitar riffs, rhythmically dominant breakdowns, and influences from hardcore and nu metal. Elements from industrial metal and modern metal productions are also sometimes integrated into their sound.

The vocals combine aggressive screams with rhythmically emphasized vocals. Lyrically, the band often deals with themes such as personal alienation, social pressure and psychological stress.

=== Studio albums ===
List of studio albums
| Title | Album details |
|---|---|
| SOMA | Released: 17. February 2023; Label: Arising Empire |
| DOGMA | Released: 23 October 2026 Label: Arising Empire |

=== EPs ===
List of extended plays
| Title | EP details |
|---|---|
| OPIUM EP | Released: 27. September 2024; Label: Arising Empire |

=== Singles ===
- "Firewalk" (2019)
- "Livebait" (2020)
- "Mantis" (2020)
- "Snakeoil" (2021)
- "Exitwound" (2021)
- "Trauma Culture" (2021)
- "Wraith" (2022)
- "Half Me" (2022)
- "Ex Negativo" (2023)
- "Blacklight" (2023)
- "I Am But A Guest In Exile" (2023)
- "Concrete Ceiling" (2023)
- "Quitter Talk" (2023)
- "Nothing Left To Lose But The Chains" (2024)
- "Fatalist" (2024)
- "In Denial" (2024)

== Awards and nominations ==
| Year | Award | Category | Result |
|---|---|---|---|
| 2024 | Heavy Music Awards | | |
| 2024 | Heavy Music Awards | Best International Breakthrough Artist | Nominated |

== Tours ==
| Year | Tour | With | Territory |
|---|---|---|---|
| 2024 | Resolve | Cane Hill · Acres | Europe |
| 2024 | Oceano | To The Grave · Vctms | United States |
| 2025 | Thrown | Diesect | Australia |
| 2025 | Get The Shot | Vomit Forth · Soulprison | Europe |
| 2025 | Upon A Burning Body | King810 · Left To Suffer · Bury My Demons | United States |
| 2025 | Future Palace | Hawk | United States |
| 2025 | Heavy Hitter | Demsfightingwords | United States |
| 2025 | Rise Of The Northstar | Get The Shot | Europe |
