= Vitja (band) =

German metalcore band

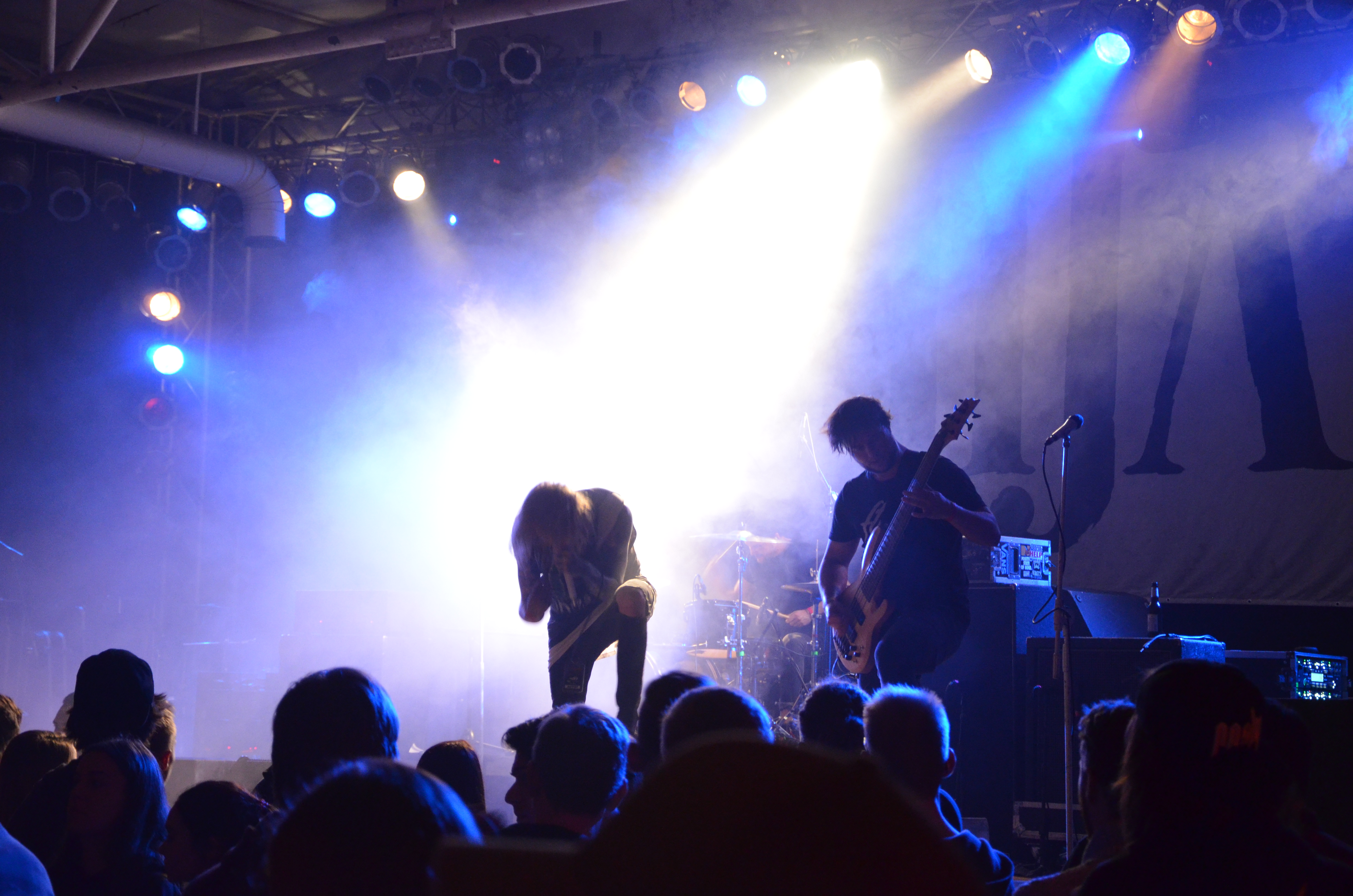
- Vitja at Taste of Anarchy Fest in Cologne, 2016

Background information
- Origin: Münster and Cologne, Germany
- Genres: Metalcore, progressive metal, djent
- Years active: 2013–2022
- Labels: Redfield, Arising
- Past members: Gabriel Spigolon (vocals); Fabio DeDominicis (guitar); Florian Vogel (bass); Daniel Pampuch (drums); David Beule (vocals); Vladimir Donchenko (guitar); Mario Metzler (bass)

Vitja was a German metalcore band with members from Münster and Cologne, formed in 2013. Vitja is Russian for Viktor, which means winner, but according to the band, the sound and aesthetics of the word were key to the naming. The band later disbanded in 2022.

== Biography ==
The group was formed in 2013 by former musicians from the bands Disposed to Mirth, Shake the Pagoda Tree, Progress Utopia and Myterror. The group quickly got a recording contract with Redfield Records, which resulted in the debut album Echoes was released. Vitja played in August 2013 as a substitute for Silent Screams on the For Those About to Mosh Tour with Martyr Defiled. In July and August 2014, Vitja toured several places in Europe supporting Texas in July and Iwrestledabearonce.

In February and March 2015 the band played a German tour supporting Annisokay and Callejon. The band has been confirmed for Summer Breeze and Vainstream in summer 2015.

On 6 February 2015, the group's first EP, Your Kingdom, was released via Redfield Records.

In 2017 they supported Emil Bulls on their tour. In the same year her album Digital love was released, which represented a change in style towards more melodic Metalcore with a higher proportion of clear vocals.

The following year Vitja's next album Mistaken was released. However, very shortly after the release, the band canceled their planned "Mistaken" tour and kept quiet about the reasons for several months until May 2019 when a new singer was presented with the release of the latest single "Back". Singer David Beule, founding member of the band, had been replaced by Gabriel Spigolon, who like him performs the metal band's guttural vocals.

The band finally broke up in April 2022. The main reason given is the lack of a common basis after many years of change.

== Musical style ==
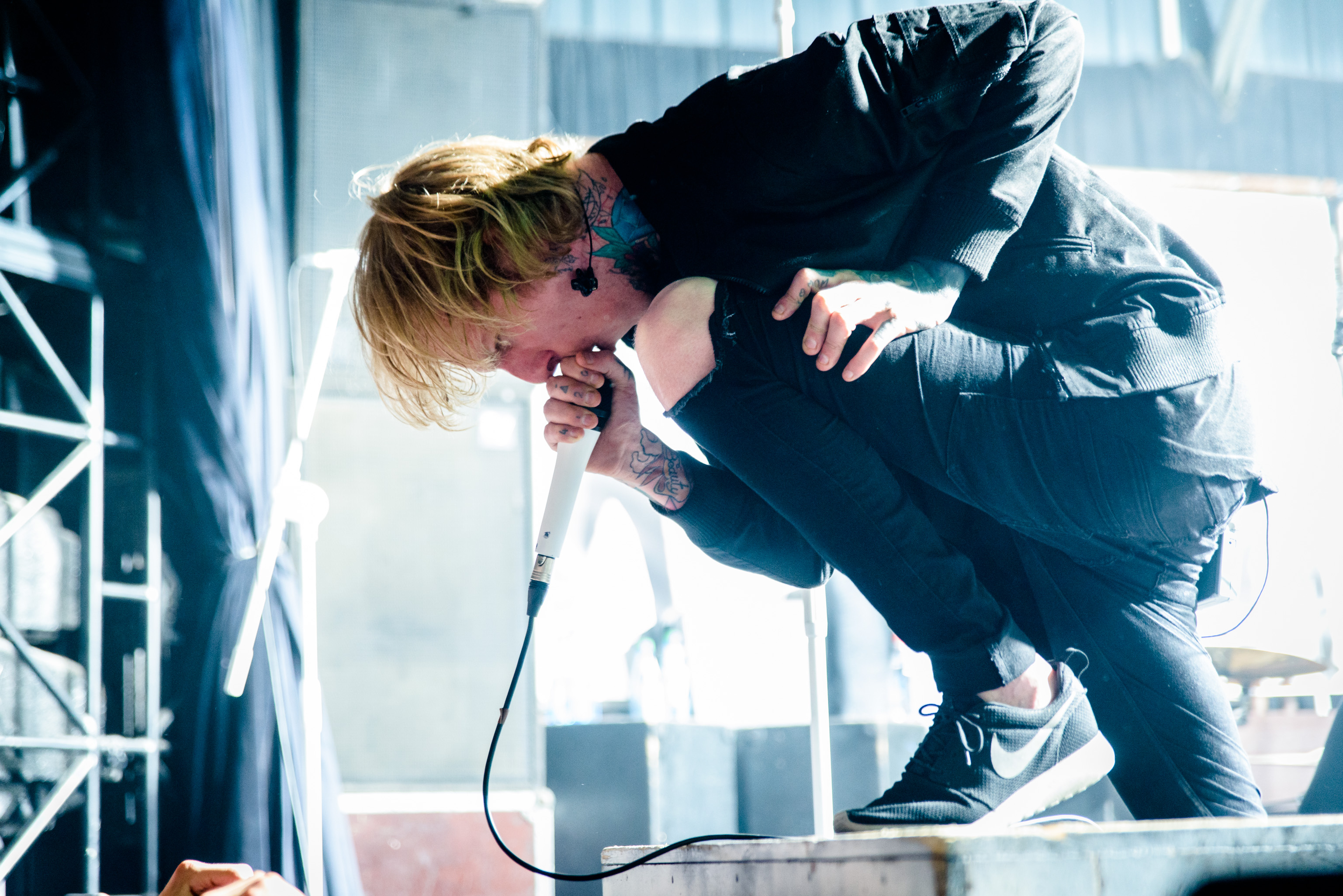
David Beule in 2015

The interviewer at Dearly Demented attributed the group to the metalcore scene, but also to the djent scene. Andreas Kuhlmann of the Ox-Fanzine describes the music as comparable to Veil of Maya and Volumes. Rock Hard magazine's Volkmar Weber describes Vitja as one of many "Metalcore/Djent hybrids".

== Discography ==
- 2013: Echoes (album, Redfield Records)
- 2015: Your Kingdom (EP, Redfield Records)
- 2017: Digital Love (LP, Century Media Records)
- 2018: Mistaken (LP, Century Media Records)
- 2019: Thirst (LP, Arising Empire)
