= Awake the Dreamer =

Swedish post-hardcore band

- Origin: Stockholm, Sweden
- Genres: Post-hardcore; metalcore
- Years active: 2015–present
- Label: Arising Empire
- Members: Max Andrén; Henric Packendorf
- Past members: Fabian Fagerberg; Alexander Backman; Oscar Järn; Benjamin Turesson; Kenny Silvergren; Victor Sandberg; Johan Norsander

Awake the Dreamer is a Swedish post-hardcore band from Stockholm first formed in 2015. The group initially consisted of Max Andren (vocals), Alexander Backman (guitar), Oscar Järn (guitar), Benjamin Turesson (bass), and Fabian Fagerberg (drums). They released their debut EP Awake the Dreamer the same year, and Grow in 2016. In 2019, they signed with Arising Empire and released their first full-length album Damaged Souls.

== History ==
=== Formation and Damaged Souls ===
The band was founded in 2015, including lead vocalist Max Andrén, guitarists Alexander Backman and Oscar Järn, bassist and backing vocals Kenny Silvergren, and drummer Fabian Fagerberg. The year of their band debut, the released a self titled EP, in 2016, the EP Grow was dropped, and in 2019, they signed with Arising Empire in which they released their debut album Damaged Souls in which music videos for the songs Your Mind, Atmosphere featuring Ryo Kinoshita of Crystal Lake, Far Away, and Lunar were dropped.

== COVID-19 and Holocene ==
Two years after the album in 2021, shortly after the COVID lockdowns, Awake the Dreamer recorded a reimagined EP of the album Damaged Souls using 5 tracks from that said album and releasing a video to the song Believe and Far Away. The pandemic hit the Swedish band hard and the Stockholm-based group decided to start a new chapter, in which in 2022, they dropped a single titled Alone along with a music video. At the start of 2023, Awake the Dreamer joined Self Deception on tour in Central Europe with Dead by April as the headliners. In September of the same year, Awake the Dream dropped yet another single titled Labyrinth along with a music video. In December that year, Awake the Dreamer and Norwegian punk group Blood Command opened up at the Slaktkyrkan in Stockholm with Imminence as the headliners. In September of 2024, the band dropped their second album Holocene, beforehand they released 2 EPs titled Violence and Take My Hand and the songs from both EPs are featured on the sophomore album. In 2025, the band released a new single titled Save You along with a music video.

== Members ==
=== Current ===
- Max Andrén (Vocals)
- Henric Packendorff (Bass)

=== Former ===
- Fabian Fagerberg (Drums)
- Alexander Backman (Guitar)
- Oscar Järn (Guitar)
- Kenny Silvergren (Bass)

== Discography ==
=== Albums ===
- Damaged Souls (2019)
- Holocene (2024)

=== EPs ===
- Awake the Dreamer (2015)
- Grow (2016)
- Damages Souls - Reimagined (2021)
- Violence (2024)
- Take My Hand (2024)

=== Music Videos ===
- Your Mind
- Atmosphere feat Ryo Kinoshita
- Far Away
- Lunar
- Believe (Acoustic)
- Far Away (Acoustic)
- Alone
- Labyrinth
- Broken Home
- Years Begin to Fade
- Save You
