= List of melodic metalcore bands =

The following is a list of bands described as playing melodic metalcore, a genre of music combining metalcore with melodic death metal.

== List of bands ==
- 7 Angels 7 Plagues
- A Day to Remember
- The Agonist
- All That Remains
- The Autumn Offering
- As Blood Runs Black
- As I Lay Dying
- Atreyu
- August Burns Red
- Avenged Sevenfold
- Bleed from Within
- Bleeding Through
- Bring Me the Horizon
- Bullet for My Valentine
- Bury Tomorrow
- Caliban
- Cataract
- Darkest Hour
- Dead to Fall
- Electric Callboy
- Feed Her to the Sharks
- Fit for a King
- Heaven Shall Burn
- Ice Nine Kills
- I Killed the Prom Queen
- In This Moment
- Killswitch Engage
- Light the Torch
- Misery Signals
- Miss May I
- Mutiny Within
- Of Mice & Men
- Parkway Drive
- Phinehas
- Poison the Well
- Polaris
- Prayer for Cleansing
- Shadows Fall
- Shai Hulud
- Trivium
- Unearth
- The Raven Age
- Wage War

== See also ==
- List of metalcore bands
- List of melodic death metal bands
