= The Oklahoma Kid (band) =

German metalcore band

- Origin: Rostock, Mecklenburg-Vorpommern, Germany
- Genres: Metalcore; post-hardcore
- Years active: 2012–present
- Label: Arising Empire
- Members: Fred Stölzel; Andreas Reinhard; Robert Elfenbein; David J. Burtscher; Tobias Rische
- Past members: Tomm Brümmer

The Oklahoma Kid is a German metalcore band based out of Rostock, Mecklenburg-Vorpommern first formed in 2012.

== History ==
Their formation began in 2012, consisting of vocalist and frontman Tomm Brümmer, drummer David J. Burtscher, guitarists Fred Stölzel and Robert Elfenbein, and bassist Andreas Reinhard and since the establishment the Oklahoma Kid have consistently pushed the envelope, setting the pace for their foundation in the German metal scene. Their debut EP "Fortuneteller" was released in 2014. One year later the band added a second EP "Doppelganger" to their repertoire and was produced by Aljoscha Sieg. With the help of video director Pavel Trebukhin, the Oklahoma Kid created their first music video for their hit-single ‘Scharlatan’, for which they received the national PopFish Music Video Award. Afterwards, the band toured Germany with Stick to Your Guns, Carnifex, Evergreen Terrace, and Hatebreed. In 2019, the Oklahoma Kid released their first album "Solarray". The band released their second album in 2022 titled "Tangerine Tragic" with a music video for the single "Melt Into You" from the said album and once again teamed up with Trebukhin for the video production. In 2024, they released a music video for the song "Ignoranz" directed by Sven Int-Veen. A month later, the quintet released yet another video titled "Masquerade" for the upcoming EP "Featherminded" which was released in August 2024.

== Band members ==
Current members

- Fred Stölzel - guitar
- Andreas Reinhard - guitar
- Robert Elfenbein - bass
- David J. Burtscher - drums
- Tobias Rische - vocals

Past members

- Tomm Brümmer - vocals

== Discography ==
Albums

- Solarray (2019)
- Tangerine Tragic (2022)

EPs

- Fortuneteller (2014)
- Doppelganger (2015)
- Featherminded (2024)
