= Blood Command =

Norwegian punk rock band

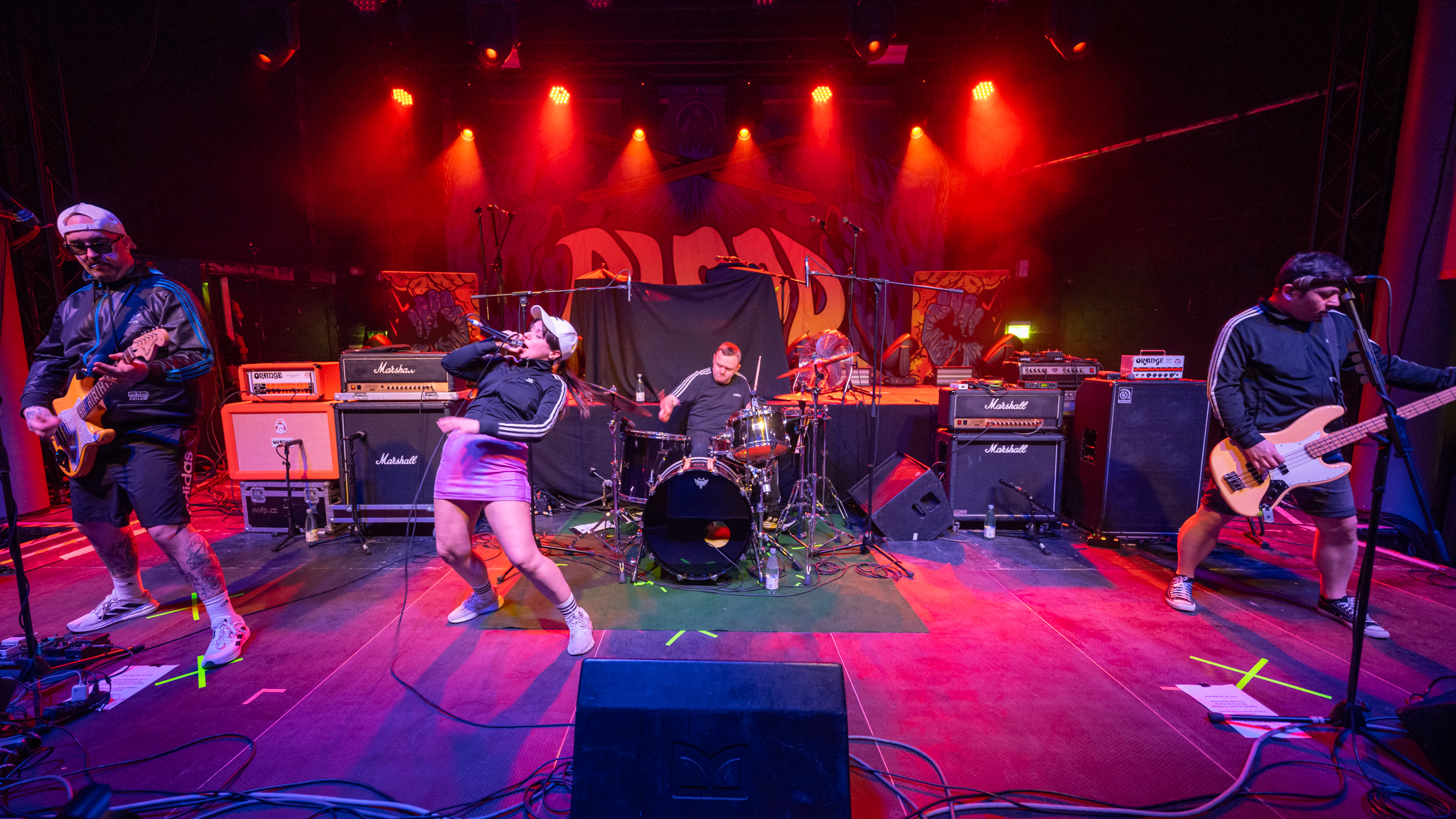
- Blood Command live in Germany in 2025

Background information
- Origin: Bergen, Hordaland, Norway
- Genres: Post-hardcore; Punk rock; hardcore punk
- Years active: 2008–present
- Labels: Fysisk Format; Hassle; Arising Empire
- Members: Nikki Brumen; Yngve Andersen; Snorre Kilvær; Sigurd Haakaas
- Past members: Silje Tombre; Karina Ljone; Benjamin Berge; Simon Oliver Økland
- Website: www.bloodcommand.net

Blood Command is a Norwegian punk rock band from Bergen. The band was formed in 2008 by Yngve Andersen, Silje Tombre and Sigurd Haakaas. The current lineup consists of Andersen, Haakaas, Snorre Kilvær and Nikki Brumen. The band has been praised for their high-energy live shows and their fresh, vibrant take on rock music, with their albums earning rave reviews from Kerrang!, Metal Hammer, and others. As of 2023, Blood Command has released five studio albums and four EPs.

== Biography ==
=== Formation, Ghostclocks and Funeral Beach: 2008–2013 ===
Blood Command was founded in Bergen in 2008 by guitarist Yngve Andersen, vocalist Silje Tombre and drummer Sigurd Haakaas. The band first released two EPs in 2009, before their debut album Ghostclocks was released in 2010. The album was nominated for the Norwegian Grammy award Spellemannprisen in 2011. Following the album's release, Blood Command supported the Canadian hardcore band Comeback Kid on their European tour in 2011. In 2012, bassist Simon Oliver Økland joined the band for their second full-length titled Funeral Beach. The album received positive reviews both domestically and internationally from magazines such as Kerrang! and Metal Hammer. The band toured extensively in following the release of Funeral Beach and supporting acts for Protest the Hero, Gallows, and Biffy Clyro.

=== Line-up changes, Cult Drugs and Return of the Arsonist: 2014–2019 ===
In November 2014, founding member and vocalist Tombre departed Blood Command and was subsequently replaced by Karina Ljone. The band's third album, and first with new vocalist Ljone, was released in 2017. Cult Drugs was met with positive reviews from critics, with high ratings from Kerrang, Metal Hammer and Ox Magazine. The band toured extensively in support of the album, while bassist Økland would leave the band in 2019. Blood Command followed up Cult Drugs that same year with a seven-track EP titled Return of the Arsonist. The release received positive reviews from magazines such as Kerrang and Distorted Sound. Songwriter Andersen noted that the title track is a sequel to their 2011 track "Summon The Arsonist" off the Hand Us the Alpha Male! EP: "A gift from us to our most loyal fans who have been with us since the beginning."

=== New vocalist, Praise Armageddonism and World Domination: 2020–present ===
Blood Command joined fellow Norwegian band Kvelertak on tour in early 2020, which came to a halt due to the COVID-19 pandemic. During the lockdown in Norway, the band announced in April that current vocalist Ljone would be leaving due to pregnancy. In June 2021, ex-Pagan vocalist Nikki Brumen was announced as the new vocalist of the band. Alongside the announcement, the band released a new single titled "A Villain's Monologue", while a second single, "The End is Her", followed up a few months later. Both singles were accompanied by music videos that notably featured separate filming locations as Brumen was still located in Melbourne, Australia. The band's fourth album Praise Armageddonism was released in July 2022, with Kerrang calling it a creative rebirth for the band. After signing with Arising Empire, Blood Command's fifth album, World Domination, was released in September 2023.

== Musical style ==
Musically, the band has referenced artists like Refused and Boney M. as their main inspirations when writing, alongside other acts like the Clash. The band's main songwriter Yngve Andersen has stated that the band is: "a blissful mix of R&B, punk and a little disco, (...) And two percent metal." Lyrically, the band has found inspiration from rave culture, cults such as Heaven's Gate, and the increasing political manipulation taking place in both Europe and the US.

== Band members ==
Current members

- Nikki Brumen – lead vocals (2020–present)
- Yngve Andersen – guitars, bass, synthesizers, backing vocals (2008–present)
- Snorre Kilvær – bass, guitars, synthesizers, backing vocals (official member 2019–present; live member 2017–2019)
- Sigurd Haakaas – drums (2008–present)

Former members

- Silje Tombre – lead vocals (2008–2014)
- Simon Oliver Økland – bass, backing vocals (official member 2014–2019; live member 2012–2014)
- Karina Ljone – lead vocals (2014–2020)
- Benjamin Berge – guitars, backing vocals (official member 2019–2024; live member 2018–2019)

Former live members

- Bjarte Haugland – guitars, synthesizers, backing vocals (2010–2017)
- Ole Gunnar Eikeland – bass, backing vocals (2010–2011)
- Endre Olsen – guitar, backing vocals (2011)
- Sjalg Otto Unnison – guitars, backing vocals (2011–2012)
- Nikolas Jon Aarland – guitars, backing vocals (2013)
- Inge Johansson – bass, backing vocals (2023)

== Discography ==
=== Studio albums ===
- Ghostclocks (2010)
- Funeral Beach (2012)
- Cult Drugs (2017)
- Praise Armageddonism (2022)
- World Domination (2023)

=== EPs ===
- Five Inches of a Car Accident (2009)
- Party All the Way to the Hospital (2009)
- Hand Us the Alpha Male! (2011)
- Return of the Arsonist (2019)
- Forever Soldiers Of Esther (2023)
- Wet Death (2026)

=== Singles ===
- Cult of the New Beat (2012)
- High Five for Life (2012)
- Here Next to Murderous (2012)
- Cult Drugs (2017)
- Saturday City (2020)
- A Villain’s Monologue (2021)
- The End Is Her (2021)
- Losing Faith (2023)
- Decades (2023)
- Forever Soldiers Of Esther (2023)
- The Plague On Both Your Houses (2023)
- Heaven’s Hate (2023)
- We Could Be Heaven (2024)
- All I Ever Hate About Is You (2025)
- Mariah’s Song (2025)

== Awards and nominations ==
Spellemann Awards

Year	Category	Work	Result
2010	Rock	Ghostclocks	Nominated
