= Engst (band) =

German punk band

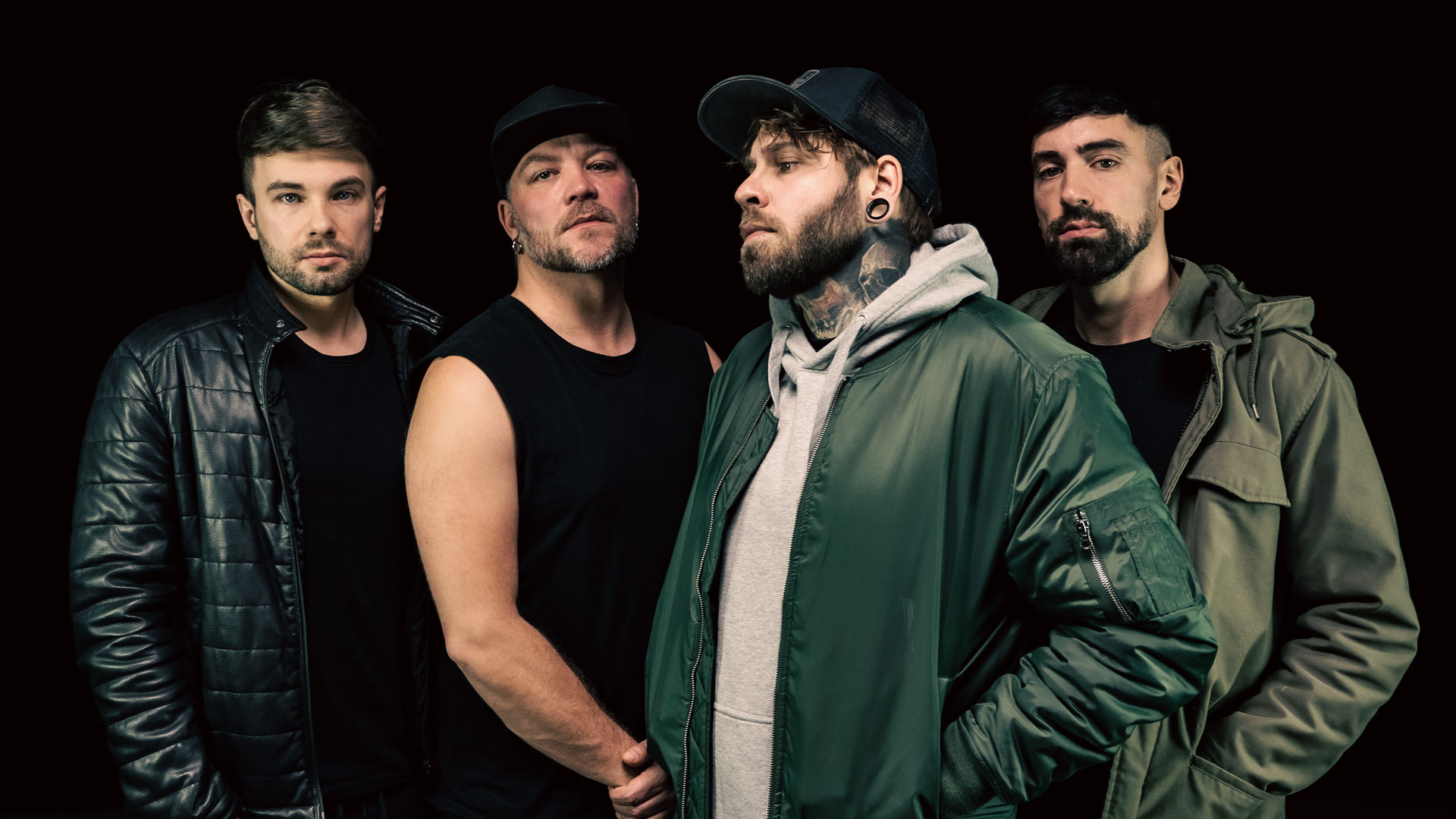
- Yuri, Chris, Matthias, and Ramin (2021)

Background information
- Origin: Berlin, Germany
- Genres: Punk rock; pop punk
- Years active: 2015–present
- Label: Arising Empire
- Members: Matthias Engst; Ramin Tehrani; Yuri Cernovolov; Chris Wendel
- Past members: Tim Eden; Kevin Heidenreich; Alexander Köhler
- Website: https://www.engst-musik.de/

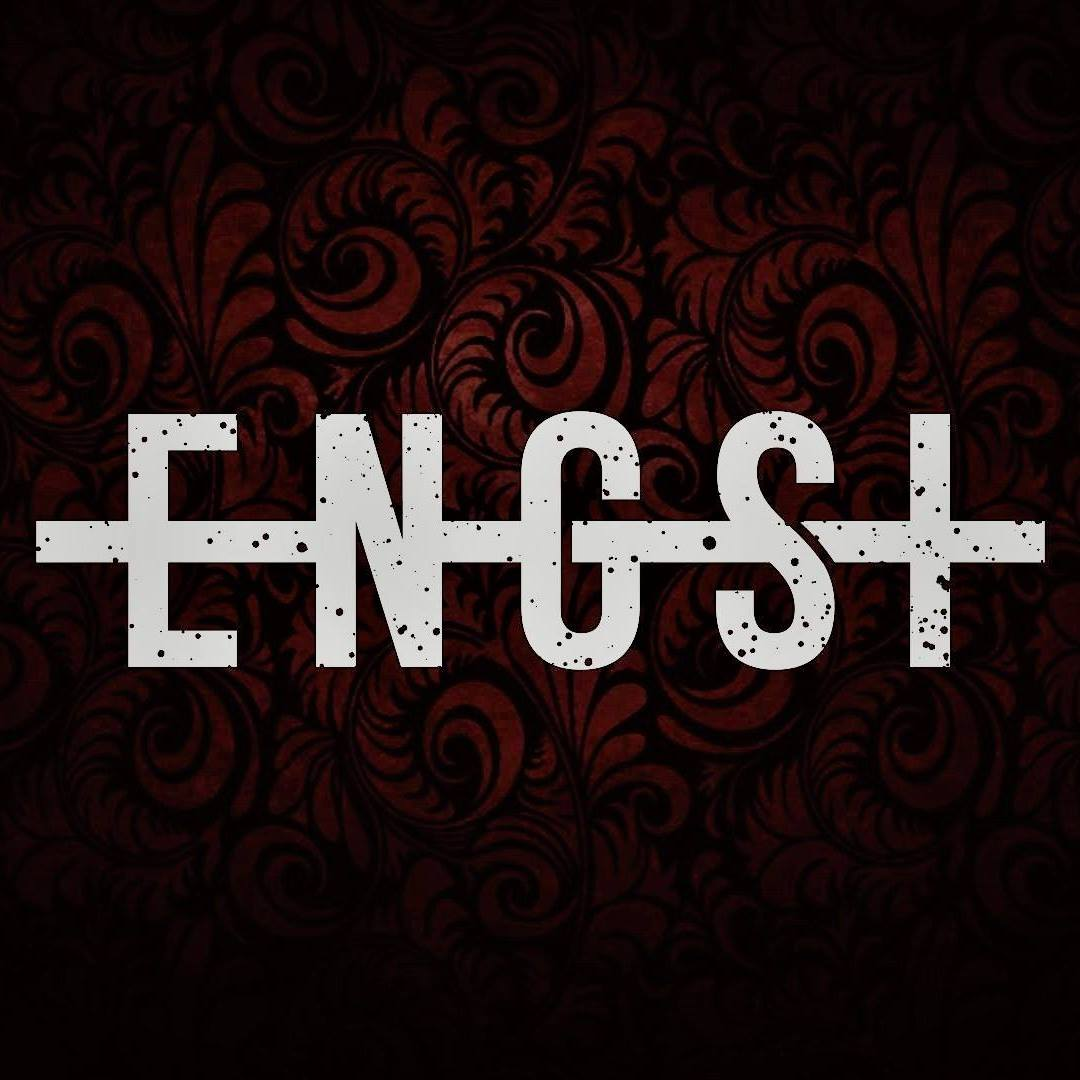
Engst Band Logo

Engst is a German punk band founded in Berlin in 2015.

== History ==
The band Engst was founded in 2015 by vocalist and namesake frontman Matthias Engst, drummer Yuri Ceronovolov, bassist Alexander Köhler, guitarist and backing vocalist Ramin Tehrani, keyboarder Tim Eden, and guitarist Kevin Heidenreich. Matthias Engst was the winner of a singing television competition called Die Band in which Köhler, Eden, and Cernovolov were also contestants and rather than pursue a record deal to be a pop star, After a year of forming the band and playing in some concerts, Tim Eden departed from the band. The band produced music videos and they released their first self-titled EP. After the release of their EP, Kevin Heidenreich left. The band decided not to replace Heidenreich and continue with one guitarist. In 2017, Engst signed with German record label Arising Empire and re-released their self titled album. Afterwards they went on tour with fellow German punk band Serum 114. In the Spring of 2018, the band went into the studio and recorded their debut album titled "Flächenbrand" which was released on October 26, 2018. After the release of their first album, bassist Köhler departed and was replaced by Chris Wendel. Between 2018 and 2019, Engst went on tour with fellow German bands Massendefekt, Betontod, and Rogers. As 2019 was wrapping up into 2020, the band Engst played their first headline tours through Germany, Austria, and Switzerland. Before 2020 wrapped up, the band released their second album Schöne neue Welt, which landed at number 20 in the official German album charts. In 2021, the EP Vier Gesichter was released along with the music video "Gute Jahre". In the Summer of 2022, the band played their third headline tour with the Schöne neue Sommer Tour. Engst's third album was released in October 2023 titled "Irgendwas ist immer". The album ranks 14th in the official German album charts, making it the band's second top 20 album. Engst toured Germany, Austria, and Switzerland with the new album from November 2023. In October 2024, they headlined the Irgenwas Ist Immer Tour in Germany with Schimmerling as their special guest.

== Music style ==
Engst deals with catchy lyrics and melodies that lean towards the punk rock vibe. There isn't a specific genre to identify Engst yet they are supported by punk community. In their lyrics, the band often expresses their leftwing views and speak out against right-wing extremism, fascism and xenophobia.

== Band members ==
Current

- Matthias Engst - vocals
- Ramin Tehrani - guitar, vocals
- Yuri Cernovolov - drums
- Chris Wendel - bass

Former

- Tim Eden - keyboard
- Kevin Heidenreich - guitar
- Alexander Köhler - bass

== Discography ==
Albums

- 2018: Flächenbrand
- 2020: Schöne neue Welt
- 2023: Irgendwas ist immer

EPs

- 2017: Engst
- 2021: Vier Gesichter

Singles

- 2019: Unsere Kneipe
- 2021: Dunkelheit
- 2021: Raumschiff
- 2021: Au Revoir
- 2021: Gute Jahre
- 2022: Immer noch am Leben
- 2022: Scheiß Liebeslieder
- 2022: Hast du vielleicht (Sondaschule-Cover)
- 2023: Was wäre wenn
- 2024: Herr Meier Von Der AfD

Music Videos

- 2017: Hymne der Verlierer
- 2017: Ohne Dich
- 2017: Lila Wolken (Marteria-Cover)
- 2017: Auf die Freundschaft
- 2017: Zeit was zu bewegen
- 2018: Optimisten
- 2018: Der Moment
- 2019: Ich steh wieder auf
- 2019: Ist mir egal
- 2020: Träumer und Helden
- 2020: Der König
- 2020: Unsere Kneipe
- 2020: Wieder da
- 2020: Mein Problem
- 2020: Schöne neue Welt
- 2020: Alle tragen schwarz
- 2020: Schlechtes Gewissen
- 2020: Soll der Teufel
- 2021: Keinen Meter (feat. Evergreen Terrace)
- 2021: Dunkelheit
- 2021: Raumschiff
- 2021: Au Revoir
- 2021: Au Revoir (Pianoversion)
- 2021: Gute Jahre
- 2021: Zu Hause (Pianoversion)
- 2022: Immer noch am Leben
- 2022: Hast du vielleicht (Sondaschule-Cover)
- 2022: Scheiß Liebeslieder
- 2023: Was wäre wenn
- 2023: Geschichte schreiben
- 2023: Drei Uhr Nachts
- 2023: Umtausch ausgeschlossen
- 2023: Kopf Hoch
- 2023: Wir werden alle sterben
