= Lost in Hollywood =

German metalcore band from Hamburg

- Origin: Hamburg, Germany
- Genres: Metalcore
- Years active: 2023–present
- Label: Arising Empire
- Members: Amon Garrasi; Timo Dymala; Julian Utz; Samuel Mineo

Lost in Hollywood is a German metalcore band based out of Hamburg.

== History ==
=== Formation and The Beauty of Death (2023-2024) ===
The band first formed in 2023, with Amon Garrasi as the vocalist, Timo Dymala as the guitarist, Julian Utz as the bassist, and Samuel Mineo on the drums. Within a year in November, the Hamburg-based quartet dropped their debut album "The Beauty of Death", which quickly gained the attention of the alternative rock and metalcore scene. During that time, they dropped some music videos, including one to the song "Make Me Feel Alright" featuring Jules Mitch of fellow German metalcore act SETYØURSAILS. Between November of 2024 and January the following year, Lost in Hollywood began going on tour in major cities in their native Germany.

=== Signing with Arising Empire and Self-Titled Album (2025-present) ===
In 2025, following the success of The Beauty of Death, Lost in Hollywood signed with German record label Arising Empire, and recorded their first single "Chasing Dreams" along with a music video co-produced by Max Ivory and Annisokay frontman Christoph Wieczorek. In June that year, the German quartet dropped another song and music video titled "The Fire" which was directed by Daniel Priess, and the song combined powerful riffs, emotional clean vocals, and haunting breakdowns into an impressive soundscape which underscored the band's versatility. In September that year, the band dropped another single "Pretty Skin" during which they received help in the songwriting process from Manuel Kohlert of Future Palace. Their sophomore self-titled album was released on March 20, 2026.

== Musical style ==
While staying true to the metalcore scene, their music and lyrics tend to have a pop and R&B vibe and the songs tend to be heartbreaking, melancholic, impactful, and energetic. Their style of music expresses emotion with energy.

== Band members ==
=== Current members ===
- Amon Garrasi – Vocals (2023-present)
- Timo Dymala – Guitar (2023-present)
- Julian Utz – Bass (2023-present)
- Samuel Mineo – Drums (2023-present)

== Discography ==
Albums

- The Beauty of Death (2024)
- Lost in Hollywood (2026)
