= Accvsed =

German metalcore band

ACCVSED
- Origin: Wiesbaden, Hesse, Germany
- Genres: Metalcore
- Years active: 2021–present
- Label: Arising Empire
- Members: Tino Mehlig; Valentin Noack; Daniel Gorgievski; Pascal Klebe; Christopher Lerner
- Website: https://www.accvsed.com/

Accvsed (stylized in capital letters) is a German metalcore band from Wiesbaden, founded in 2021. The band gained recognition within the European metalcore scene following the release of their debut EP House of Doubt (2023) and their signing to the record label Arising Empire in 2024. Their debut studio album, Dealers of Doom, was released in 2025.

== History ==
=== Formation and early releases (2021–2023) ===
ACCVSED was formed in 2021 in Wiesbaden, Germany. Following their formation, the band released several singles and established an early presence within the modern metalcore scene.

In December 2023, they released their debut EP House of Doubt, which marked their first broader recognition in the European metalcore community.

=== Signing and debut album (2024–2025) ===
In 2024, ACCVSED signed with the German record label Arising Empire and released several singles, including "Day of the Locust".

Subsequent releases included singles such as "Avoider", which received coverage in music media outlets.

Their debut album Dealers of Doom was released in 2025 via Arising Empire. The album received reviews from several music publications, which highlighted the band’s development within the modern metalcore scene.

== Musical style ==
ACCVSED’s music is generally categorized as metalcore, combining heavy guitar riffs, breakdowns and melodic elements typical for the genre.

== Band members ==
- Tino Mehlig - vocals
- Valentin Noack - guitar, backing vocals
- Daniel Gorgievski - guitar, backing vocals
- Pascal Klebe - bass
- Christopher Lerner - drums

== Discography ==
EP

- House of Doubt (2023)

Album

- Dealers of Doom (2025)
