= VENUES =

German post-hardcore band

- Origin: Stuttgart, Baden-Württemberg, Germany
- Genres: Post-hardcore; metalcore
- Years active: 2015–present
- Label: Arising Empire
- Members: Lela Gruber; Robin Baumann; Valentin Hahnemann; Dennis Vanhöfen
- Past members: Chrisi 'Nyves' Krithinidou; Wowa Reising; Michael Mark; Florian Brett; Toni Lixx; Constantin Ranis

VENUES, formerly known as Break Down a Venue, is a German post-hardcore band based out of Stuttgart.

== History ==
VENUES was founded in 2015 under their original name "Break Down a Venue" releasing a self-titled EP a year later with three songs listed. They began with five members, clean vocalist and frontwoman Chrisi 'Nyves' Krithinidou, unclean vocalist and frontman Robin Baumann, guitarist Constantin Ranis, bassist Michael Mark, and drummer Dennis Vanhöfen. Along the way, Toni Lixx joined as the sixth member and second guitarist. Though formed in Germany, three of their members, Nyves, Lixx, and Ranis, were natives of Greece. The band changed their name in 2017 to VENUES, during that time, Mark departed from the band and was replaced with Florian 'Flo' Brett. Most of their shows were performed at the time in their native Germany. One year later the band signed with German record label Arising Empire and dropped their first album title Aspire in which British magazine Kerrang! called "Album of the Week". In January 2019, frontwoman Nyves made the decision to depart from the band. This put VENUES in a position to cancel their upcoming shows. A few months later, the band was able to fill the void with newcomer Lela Gruber. With Gruber at the helm, in 2021, they released there next album "Solace" Afterwards, they released some singles leading up to the third album in 2024 titled "Transience".

== Members ==
Current

- Lela Gruber - clean vocalist
- Robin Baumann - unclean vocalist
- Valentin Hahnemann - guitarist
- Dennis Vanhöfen - drummer

Former

- Chrisi 'Nyves' Krithinidou - clean vocalist
- Wowa Reising - bassist
- Michael Mark - bassist
- Florian Brett - bassist
- Toni Lixx - guitarist
- Constantin Ranis - guitarist

== Discography ==
Albums

- Aspire (2018)
- Solace (2021)
- Transience (2024)

EPs

- Break Down a Venue (Self-Titled) (2015)

As a Featured Artist

- Tragedy (by Devil May Care)
