= Resolve (band) =

French metalcore band

- Origin: Lyon, France
- Genres: Metalcore; hardcore punk; alternative rock; melodic metalcore
- Years active: 2016–present
- Label: Arising Empire
- Members: Anthony Diliberto; Antonin Carré; Robin Mariat; Nathan Mariat
- Past members: Aurélien Mariat
- Website: resolveofficial.co

Resolve is a French metalcore band from Lyon.

== History ==
In 2016, after disbanding their old band Above the North, siblings Robin (bass), Aurélien (guitar), and Nathan Mariat (drums) decided to form a new band in which they recruit Anthony Diliberto, who sang for the band Happening.

The band released their first track, Exposed, on February 19, 2017, and performed in their first concert on June 13, 2017, during the Longlive Rockfest at the Transbordeur in their native Lyon. The track later became part of the EP Rêverie, which was released on October 13 of the same year and the band performed songs from that EP while on tour.

On August 3, 2018, the band released a new EP, called Stripped Down Sessions, featuring three tracks from Rêverie Reimagined, as well as a cover of Best of You by Foo Fighters. In the Fall of 2018, Aurélien Mariat decided to bid farewell to his role as guitarist in the band in order to concentrate on other projects, primarily the production of the band's music videos. Resolve then continued as a trio for the composition of their first album, with Anthony Diliberto recording the guitars, but still performed on stage as a quartet, with Antonin Carré joining as the session guitarist from 2020. The band then dropped their debut album Between Me and the Machine on November 26, 2021.

During the height of COVID-19, there were a series of restrictions that made touring hard and to counter the issue, the band organized a concert with LANDMVRKS and Glassbone, in which was filmed and broadcast on YouTube on June 2, 2021.

On March 29, 2022, Antonin officially joined the group as their guitarist. The newly formed quartet went on a series of dates, including a French headlining tour during March 2022, then on a European tour as the opening act for LANDMVRKS, in the United Kingdom with Oceans Ate Alaska, in Germany with Caliban, and in 2023 across Europe as co-headliner with Siamese.

The band performed live at Hellfest 2023. They also appeared at Resurrection Fest the same year. Their second album, Human, was released on September 15, 2023.

In November 2024, Resolve went on a European Tour headlined by While She Sleeps, with supporting acts Malevolence and Thrown.

In March 2025, Resolve joined Silent Planet as supporting act for the CURE 2025 Tour in Australia with ERRA as the headliners. In April and May that same year, Resolve joined as supporting acts with If Not For Me and Conjurer on a European Tour with Make Them Suffer as the headliners.

In September 2026, Resolve released "Spread My Ashes Into Space" a single from their upcoming album.

== Band Members ==
=== Current ===
- Anthony Diliberto (Vocals)
- Robin Mariat (Bass)
- Nathan Mariat (Drums)
- Antonin Carré (Guitar)

=== Former ===
- Aurélien Mariat (Guitar)

== Discography ==
=== Studio albums ===
- Between me and the machine (2021)
- Human (2023)
- Spread My Ashes Into Space (2027)
