= Future Palace =

German rock band

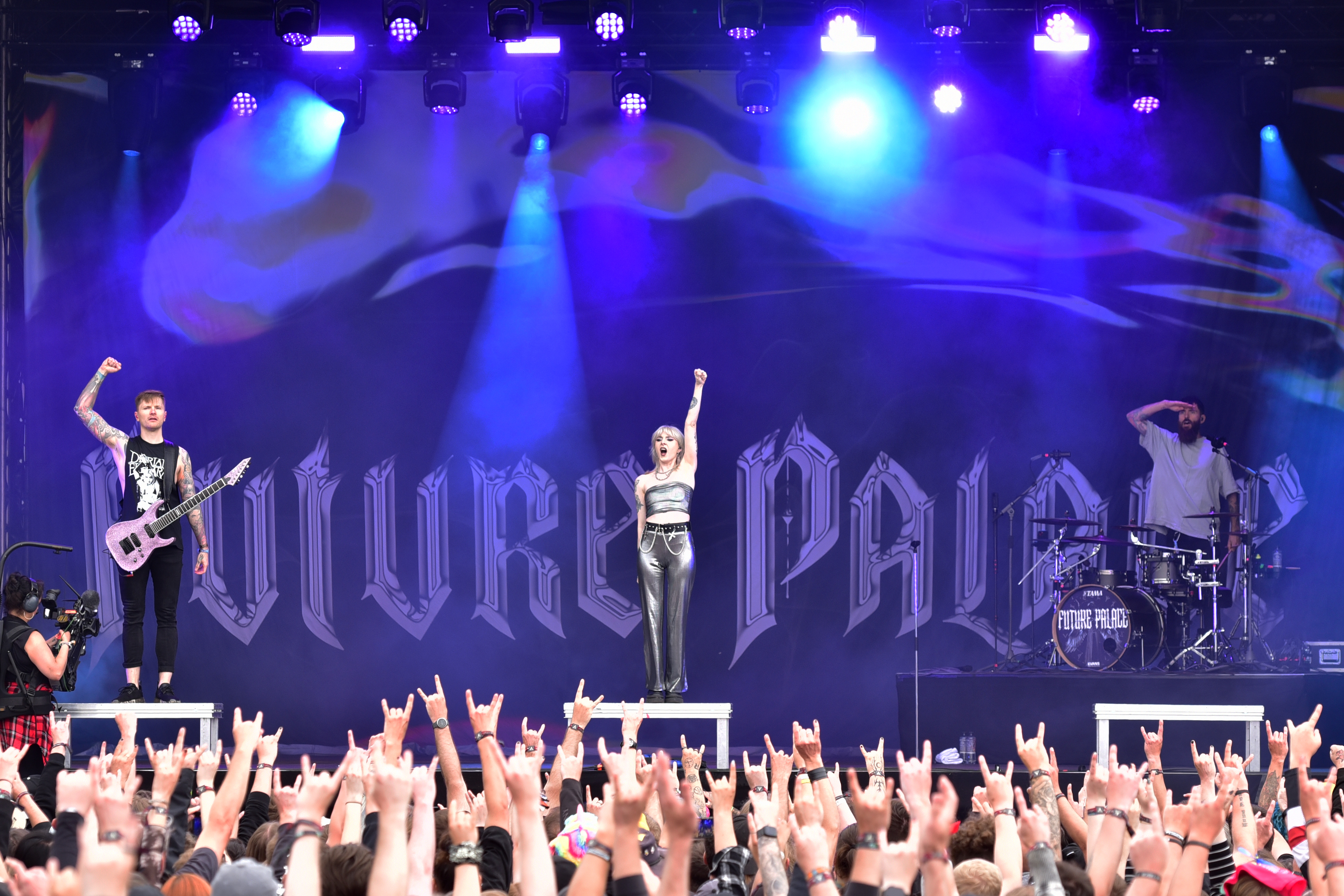
- Future Palace at Wacken Open Air 2024. From left to right: Manuel Kohlert, Maria Lessing, Johannes Früchtenicht

Background information
- Origin: Berlin, Germany
- Genres: Alternative rock; post-hardcore; alternative metal
- Years active: 2018–present
- Labels: Arising Empire; Century Media
- Members: Maria Lessing; Manuel Kohlert; Johannes Früchtenicht
- Website: future-palace.com

Future Palace is a German rock band from Berlin. It consists of vocalist Maria Lessing, guitarist Manuel Kohlert, and drummer Johannes Früchtenicht. The band has been signed to the German label Century Media Records since 2025 and to date has released four studio albums, Escape (2020), Run (2022), Distortion (2024), and Resurgence (2026).

== History ==
=== 2018–2019: Formation and early years ===
Future Palace was formed at the end of 2018 by singer Maria Lessing, guitarist Manuel Kohlert, and drummer Johannes Früchtenicht. The latter two had previously been active in several bands together and met Maria Lessing when she sang a feature for their band at the time. With the idea of establishing a new band later, the three created a WhatsApp group called Future Palace. This name was ultimately adopted as the band name. On 26 March 2019, the band released their first single "Maybe". The accompanying music video was released on 11 April 2019 on Future Palace's YouTube channel. The band then on 31 May 2019 released a second single, "Anomaly". They played their first concerts on 29 and 30 August 2019 in Berlin and Hamburg.

=== 2020: Escape and signing with Arising Empire ===
On 6 March 2020, Arising Empire announced that they had signed Future Palace. On the same day, the single "Illusionist" featuring Tobias Rische of Alazka was released along with a music video. Announced with the release of their single "Ghost Chapter" on 17 July 2020, the band released their debut album Escape on 18 September 2020. In addition, a Germany-wide headliner tour was announced for early 2021, which later had to be cancelled due to the COVID-19 pandemic.

=== 2021–2022: Run ===
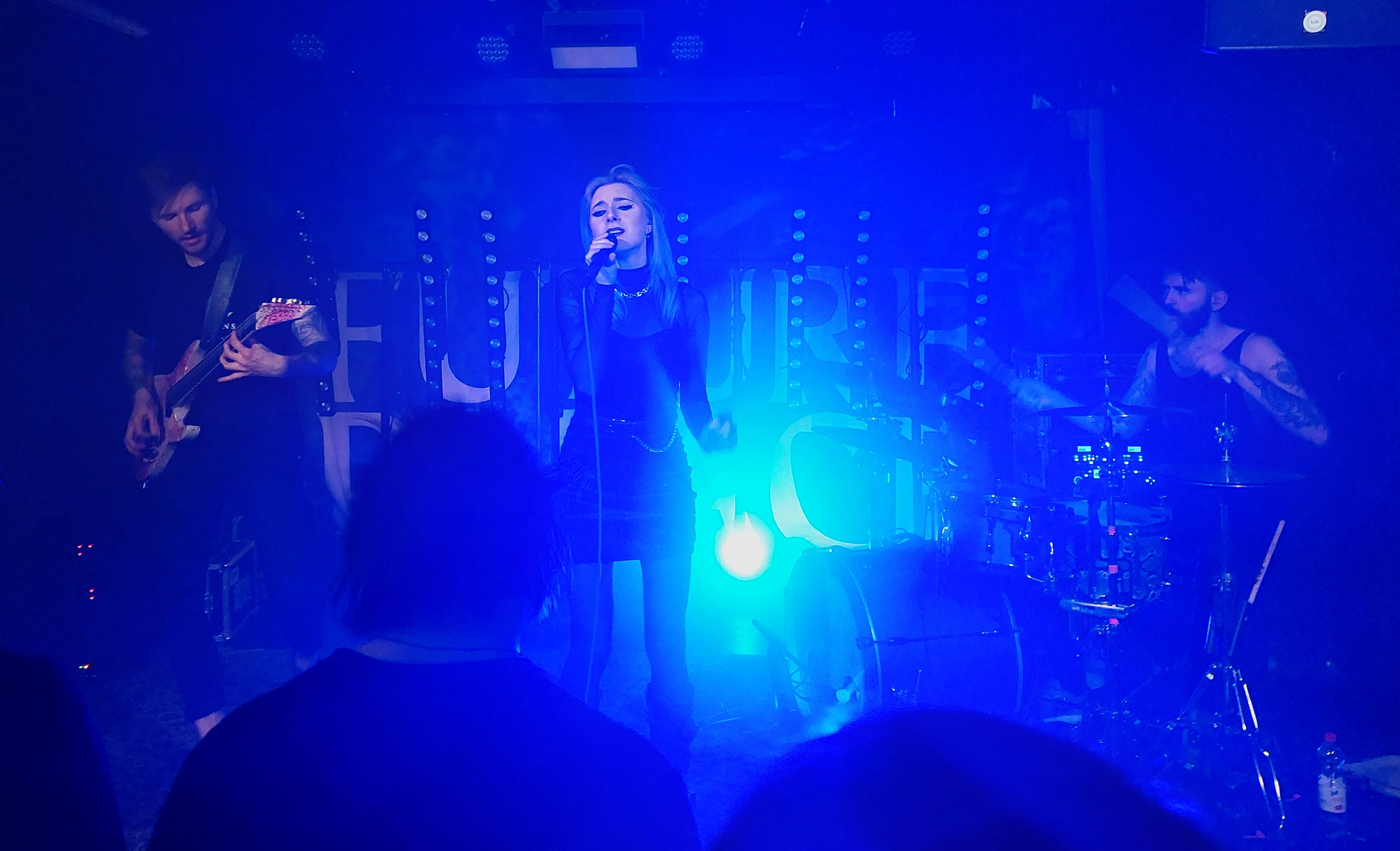
Future Palace in 2022

On 5 November 2021, the band released the single "Paradise" including a music video. With the release of the single "Heads Up" on 16 December 2021, the second album Run was also announced, which was released on 10 June 2022. The album opened on position 82 in the official German Album Charts. In April 2022, the band played their first headlining tour, called "Take Me to Paradise" tour.

=== 2023–2024: Distortion ===
On 20 April 2023, Future Palace released the single "Malphas", followed by "Uncontrolled" on 5 April 2024. On 16 May 2024, they released "The Echoes of Disparity", featuring Charlie Rolfe of As Everything Unfolds, followed by an announcement of their third studio album, Distortion, to be released on 6 September 2024. On 21 June 2024, they released the fourth single, "Dreamstate", from the upcoming album. The fifth single, "Decarabia", was released on 2 August 2024.

Distortion was released on 6 September 2024 to positive reviews. Distorted Sound Magazine gave the album a 9/10 rating, and Heavy Magazine said that "Distortion promises to take their music to new heights".

=== 2025–present: Resurgence ===
On 13 September 2025, the band released the single "Cyclone", their first release with Century Media Records, followed by "Deep Blue" on 27 November 2025, and "Supernova" on 27 March 2026. On 29 May 2026, they released "Resurge", alongside an announcement of their fourth studio album Resurgence, which was released on 31 July 2026. On 3 July 2026, they released their final single "Tidal Waves".

== Style and influences ==
The band's musical style has been described as post-hardcore/alternative rock with 80's synth-pop and electronica influences. Among others, the members name Bring Me the Horizon, Pvris, The Midnight, and Mike Oldfield as musical influences. The lyrics are written by vocalist Maria Lessing and deal with personal experiences, especially depression, inner conflicts and toxic relationships.

== Band members ==
- Maria Lessing – vocals
- Manuel Kohlert – guitar
- Johannes Früchtenicht – drums

== Discography ==
=== Studio albums ===
List of studio albums, with selected chart positions
| Title | Album details | Peak chart positions |
| Title | Album details | GER |
|---|---|---|
| Escape | Released: 18 September 2020; Label: Arising Empire; Format: CD, LP, digital download, streaming | — |
| Run | Released: 10 June 2022; Label: Arising Empire; Format: CD, LP, digital download, streaming | 82 |
| Distortion | Released: 6 September 2024; Label: Arising Empire; Format: CD, LP, digital download, streaming | 32 |
| Resurgence | Released: 31 July 2026; Label: Century Media; Format: CD, LP, digital download, streaming | 18 |

=== Music videos ===
| Year | Title | Album | Director |
|---|---|---|---|
| 2019 | "Maybe" | Escape | Niko Gindler |
| 2020 | "Illusionist" | Escape | Hello Bipo |
| 2020 | "Parted Ways" | Escape | Hello Bipo |
| 2020 | "Ghost Chapter" | Escape | Future Palace/Hello Bipo |
| 2020 | "Maybe – Stripped" | Escape | Hello Bipo |
| 2020 | "Lately" | Escape | Hello Bipo |
| 2021 | "Paradise" | Run | Pavel Trebukhin |
| 2021 | "Heads Up" | Run | Pavel Trebukhin |
| 2022 | "Flames" | Run | Pavel Trebukhin |
| 2022 | "Defeating Gravity" | Run | Peter Leukhardt |
| 2022 | "Dead Inside" | Run | Peter Leukhardt |
| 2023 | "Malphas" | Distortion | Maria Lessing, Peter Leukhardt |
| 2024 | "Uncontrolled" | Distortion | Pavel Trebukhin |
| 2024 | "The Echoes of Disparity" | Distortion | Pavel Trebukhin |
| 2024 | "Dreamstate" | Distortion | Pavel Trebukhin |
| 2024 | "Decarabia" | Distortion | Pavel Trebukhin |
| 2025 | "Cyclone" | Resurgence | Pavel Trebukhin |
| 2025 | "Deep Blue" | Resurgence | Pavel Trebukhin |
| 2026 | "Supernova" | Resurgence | Pavel Trebukhin |
| 2026 | "Resurge" | Resurgence | Pavel Trebukhin |
| 2026 | "Tidal Waves" | Resurgence | Maria Lessing, Peter Leukhardt |
| 2026 | "Nixy" | Resurgence | Hello Bipo |
