= TheCityIsOurs =

British metalcore band

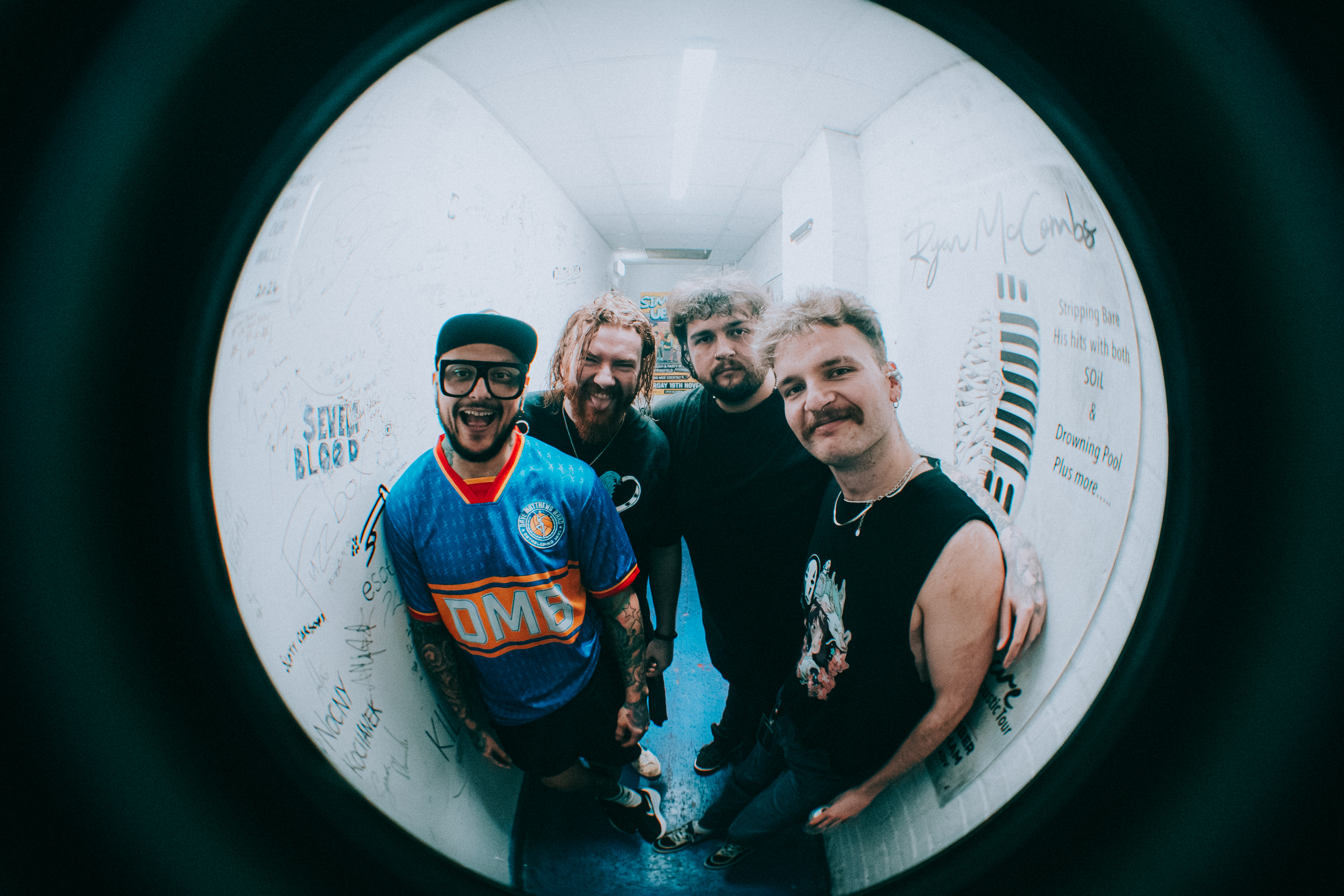
- TheCityIsOurs

Background information
- Origin: London, England
- Genres: Metalcore; melodic metalcore; alternative rock; alternative metal; post-hardcore; pop metal
- Years active: 2015–present
- Label: Arising Empire
- Members: Oli Duncanson; Mikey Page; Jamie Deeks; David Cardona
- Past members: Sam Stolliday; Stuart Mercer; Louis Giannamore; Conor Fountain; George Monroe

TheCityIsOurs is a British metalcore band based out of London, first formed in 2015.

== Band History ==
=== Formation ===
In 2015, the band was formed which featured unclean lead vocalist Sam Stolliday, guitarist and clean vocalist Mikey Page, guitarist George Monroe, bassist Jamie Deeks, and drummer Conor Fountain. A year after the formation, they released their first EP, Wildfire, which was released along with a music video. Within that time period, they shared the stage with acts like Don Broco, Betraying the Martyrs, and Deaf Havana. In May 2017, TheCityIsOurs released another EP, titled Hollow Hope, then dropped a single and music video for the song Veins in the second half of 2018.

=== Low ===
In August 2019, drummer Conor Fountain and guitarist George Monroe left the band and drummer Louis Giannamore and guitarist Stuart Mercer joined. They released their debut album, titled Low, and with that dropped a few singles with some music videos for songs like Bare Bones, which featured Connor Hallisey as a guest vocalist, Don't Wait for Me, and If You Know, You Know. During the second half of 2019, they went on tour around England.

=== Sign with Arising Empire, Coma, and departure of Stolliday ===
Two years later, shortly after the COVID-19 pandemic, TheCityIsOurs said farewell to lead vocalist Sam Stolliday and drummer Louis Giannamore. Oli Duncanson was introduced as the new lead singer and David Cardona was invited to complete the quintet as their new drummer. In that time, they signed with German record label Arising Empire. Under their new label, they released their second album, Coma, and a series of music videos from the album were released.

=== Will You Still Love Me? ===
In 2023, TheCityIsOurs released the song Shame along with a music video for the song. In the fall of 2024, the band dropped the singles and music videos to Psycho, Hot Mess, and Can You Feel It?. Can You Feel It was also released as an EP as a preview for the upcoming 2025 album. In January 2025, now as a quartet, released their third album titled Will You Still Love Me which featured the song Shame. Shortly before the album was released, the song and video for Dopamine was dropped. The band received some mixed reviews for the third album.

== Band members ==
=== Current ===
- Oli Duncanson – unclean vocals
- Mikey Page – guitar, clean vocals
- Jamie Deeks – bass
- David Cardona – drums

=== Former ===
- Sam Stolliday – unclean vocals
- Stuart Mercer – lead guitar
- Louis Giannamore – drums
- Conor Fountain – drums
- George Monroe – lead guitar

== Discography ==
=== Albums ===
- Low (2019)
- Coma (2021)
- Will You Still Love Me? (2025)

=== EPs ===
- Wildfire (2016)
- Hollow Hope (2017)
- Can You Feel It (2024)
