= Silent Screams =

English metalcore band

- Vocalist Joel Heywood performing at Breakout Festival, 2014

Background information
- Origin: Coventry, West Midlands, England
- Genres: Metalcore, melodic hardcore, post-hardcore, melodic death metal (early)
- Years active: 2007–present
- Labels: Artery, Ghost Music
- Members: Joel Heywood; Ozzi Osman; Sam Varney; Adam Mallabone; Tom Craig
- Past members: Mikey Scrivens; James Ryan
- Website: http://www.myspace.com/silentscreamsmum

Silent Screams are an English metalcore band formed in Coventry, West Midlands, England, in 2007. The band currently consists of lead vocalist Joel Heywood, guitarists Ozzi Osman and Sam Varney and drummer Adam Mallabone and bass-player and vocalist Tom Craig. The band released two EP: Ghosts in 2008, and Hope Is the Assurance of Fools in 2009; and two studio albums: When It Rains in 2011, and Hope for Now in 2014.

== History ==
The band released a self-produced EP "Ghosts" in 2008. In 2009, the band released their second EP "Hope is the Assurance of Fools", produced by Matt Hyde (As I Lay Dying, Gallows and Funeral for a Friend), in an edition of 1000 copies. In 2011, the band signed with the label Ghost Music to release their debut album with the producer Joey Sturgis (The Devil Wears Prada, Asking Alexandria, Miss May I). The album When It Rains was released on 24 October 2011.

In 2012, the lead vocalist James Ryan announced his departure of the band. In 2013, the band announced to Joel Heywood as the new lead vocalist, and with him, the band released a new song "The Way We Were".

In 2014 the band signed with Artery Recordings to release their second album Hope for Now on 22 July 2014. On 18 June 2015, the band released a music video for the song "Everything Overcome".

On 26 November 2015, bassist Tom Craig announced he would be leaving the band. The same day, the band announced they would be releasing a new song, "Everything Ends", the song featured Landon Tewers of The Plot in You. On 16 February 2017, the band announced their new band-member Mikey Scrivens on bass-guitar and also responsible for vocals.

== Members ==
Current members

- Joel Heywood – unclean vocals (2012–present), clean vocals (2017–present)
- Sam Varney – guitar (2007–present)
- Ozzi Osman – guitar (2007–present)
- Adam Mallabone – drums (2007–present)
- Tom Craig – bass, clean vocals (2008–2015, 2017–present)

Former members

- James Ryan – lead vocals (2007–2012)
- Mikey Scrivens – bass, clean vocals (2017)

== Discography ==
=== Studio albums ===
- When It Rains (2011) (Ghost Music)
- Hope for Now (2014) (Artery Recordings)

=== EPs ===
- Ghosts (2008)
- Hope Is the Assurance of Fools (2009)

=== Non-album singles ===
- "The Way We Were" (2013) (Ghost Music)
- "Everything Ends" (2015) (Independent)
- "Love/Less" (2017) (Independent)
- "Low" (2017) (Long Branch Records)

== Videography ==
Year	Title	Link	From the album
2011	Pacific Highway		When It Rains
2011	'Til There's Nothing Left		When It Rains
2012	When It Rains		When It Rains
2013	The Way We Were		non-album single
2014	A New Normal		Hope for Now
2015	Everything Overcome		Hope for Now
