= Our Mirage =

German post-hardcore band

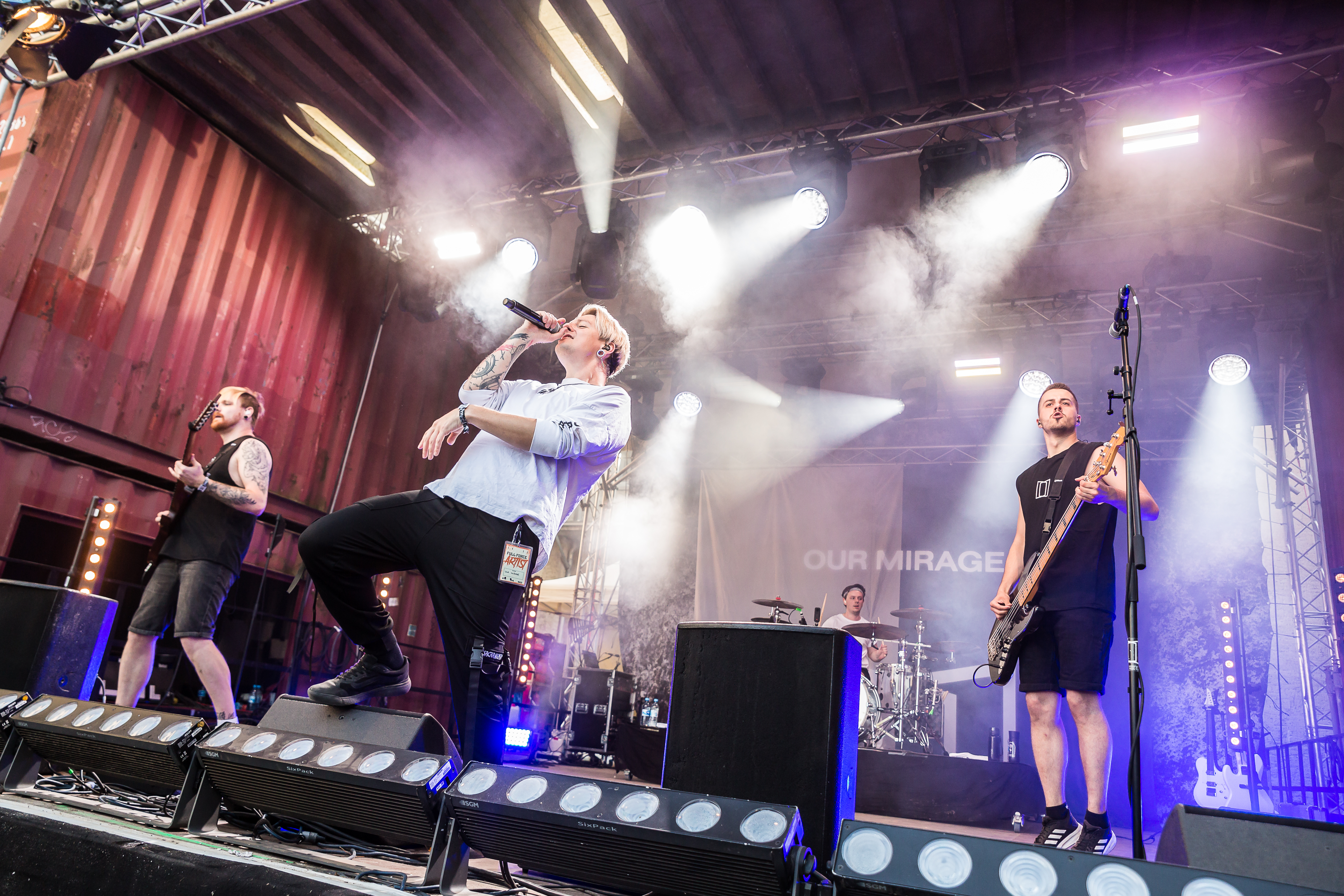
- Our Mirage at Full Force 2023 in Ferropolis, Germany

Background information
- Origin: Marl, North-Rhine Westphalia, Germany
- Genres: Metalcore; post-hardcore; melodic hardcore
- Years active: 2017–present
- Label: Arising Empire
- Members: Timo Bonner; David Fuß; Manuel Möbs; Daniel Maus
- Past members: Steffen Hirz
- Website: ourmirage.de

Our Mirage is a German metalcore band from Marl, North Rhine-Westphalia.

== History ==
=== (2017-2018) History, formation, Lifeline and early tours ===
The band was founded in March 2017 with the release of their very first single 'Nightfall', which received over 200,000 views after 2 weeks. Within a years time, Our Mirage has released 4 singles and reached almost 3 million views on these videos. They have performed many shows in Germany and have been on a small European tour in November 2017. In 2018, the band signed with German record label Arising Empire and released their first album titled "Lifeline" on August 24, 2018. During that year, they did some tours throughout Germany and around the time of the release of their first album, they were the opening act at the Elbriot Festival in Hamburg as they performed alongside Uncured, Jamey Jasta, Killswitch Engage, Beartooth, Satyricon, Skindred, Suicidal Tendencies, and Arch Enemy who closed the show. They even joined Breathe Atlantis on tour throughout Central Europe with Imminence who headlined the shows that same year.

=== (2020) Unseen Relations ===
Our Mirage Band Logo

Unseen Relations is the second studio album by Our Mirage. The album was released on February 7, 2020, through Arising Empire, and was produced by lead vocalist Timo Bonner (born 1994).

The album contains a total of 11 tracks."Falling", one of the singles from this album is features Telle Smith of The Word Alive.

=== (2022) Eclipse ===
Eclipse is the third studio album by Our Mirage. The album was released on November 25, 2022, through Arising Empire, and was produced by lead vocalist Timo Bonner.

According to one source, the album received some mixed reviews. In the music and lyrics, their songs each have an underlying ambience amidst the aggression that gives the Marl-based band their signature melancholic sound. They provided gentle guitar strumming that undertoned the resounding distortion throughout the record. Before releasing the album, between Unreal Relations and the latter release, Our Mirage released a string of songs then added the songs to the Eclipse album.

=== (2023-2026) Tours, Steffen Hirz's Departure, and Fractured Minds ===
On June 25, 2023, Our Mirage performed at the Full Force 2023 festival in Ferropolis with several other bands and Papa Roach was the Headliner for the night. In July 2023, Our Mirage performed at the Deichbrand Festival in Wurster Nordseeküste. In August, they were among the acts that performed at the Summer Breeze Open Air 2023 Festival in Dinkelsbühl, Bavaria, Germany which was headlined by In Flames, Megadeth, Powerwolf, and Trivium. In September, the band headlined the Bookwood Festival along with Judas Priest in Buchholz with other bands opening for them. In 2024, Our Mirage joined with All Faces Down the Dead By April - The Affliction Europe Tour 2024 headlined by Swedish band Dead by April and Australian band The Amity Affliction. In September 2024, the band announced the departure of their guitarist, Steffen Hirz. The band shared this news on Instagram, expressing gratitude for his 7 years of service since the band's inception. They also stated that this marks the end of an era while simultaneously ushering in a new chapter for the band.

In March 2025, the band announced the release of their single "Don't Talk" featuring Christopher Kristensen of Dead by April. The single was released alongside a music video. Our Mirage also added David to their lineup as the new guitarist, who previously toured with the band as a technician and replacement guitarist.

As of July 25, 2025, the band has already released 5 singles "Violent Spin", " Don't Talk", "Fractured", "Right Now", and " Farewell" since Steffen's departure. On January 30, 2026, their fourth album, Fractured Minds, was released with the 5 singles listed onto the album.

== Musical style ==
Our Mirage is known for their ambient music that provide emotional lyrics that can strike a nerve. Their music can offer a vast variety of elements which can relate to the listeners and they've poured their own emotions into their music. The band primarily focuses on the problems that younger folks deal with internally but their music doesn't just speak to them, it is very intuitive of the issues that many folks deal with on a common basis. Frontman Timo Bonner provides clean and unclean lyrics throughout their music. One instance of their emotion-filled lyrics is their hit "Different Eyes" from the Unseen Relations album, in which the song went in a direction of melodic and post-hardcore tracks and could also appeal to those who are less into the post-hardcore and melodic hardcore scene. In the 2022 Eclipse album, they continued their ambient and melodic playing. Our Mirage has on a consistent level have found creative ways to utilize there melodies, for example, the satisfying flow from ‘Black Hole’ into ‘Through The Night’ with ethereal guitar echoes and distant-sounding belts to foreshadow the impending chorus.

== Band members ==
=== Current members ===
- Timo Bonner — vocals, production (2017–present)
- Manuel Möbs – bass, backing vocals (2017–present)
- Daniel Maus – drums (2017–present)
- David Fuß – guitar (2025–present)

=== Past members ===
- Steffen “Stiff” Hirz – guitar (2017–2025)

== Discography ==
Albums

- Lifeline (2018)
- Unseen Relations (2020)
- Eclipse (2022)
- Fractured Minds (2026)

EPs

- Violent Sin - EP (2025)

Singles

Title	Year	Album
Nightfall	2017	Lifeline
Revivor	2017	Lifeline
My Distress	2017	Lifeline
December	2017	Lifeline
The Unknown	2018	Lifeline
Lost	2018	Lifeline
Nightfall (Piano)	2018	Non-album single
Different Eyes	2019	Unseen Relations
After All	2019	Unseen Relations
Unseen	2019	Unseen Relations
Remedy	2020	Eclipse
Through the Night	2021	Eclipse
Calling You	2022	Eclipse
Summertown (feat. Breakdown Bros)	2022	Eclipse
Black Hole	2022	Eclipse
Help Me Out!	2022	Eclipse
Farewell	2024	Fractured Minds
Right Now	2024	Fractured Minds
Fractured	2024	Fractured Minds
Don't Talk (feat. Christopher Kristensen)	2025	Fractured Minds
Violent Spin	2025	Fractured Minds
Timeloss (feat. Screamistry)	2025	Fractured Minds

Music Videos

Title	Ref.	Year
Lost		2018
Nightfall (Piano)		2018
Different Eyes		2019
After All		2019
Unseen		2019
Falling (feat. Telle Smith of The Word Alive)		2020
Transparent		2020
Remedy		2020
Through the Night		2021
Calling You		2022
Summertown (feat. Breakdown Bros)		2022
Black Hole		2022
Help Me Out!		2022
Eclipse		2022
Farewell		2024
Right Now		2024
Fractured		2024
Don't Talk (feat. Christopher Kristensen)		2025
Violent Spin		2025
Timeloss (feat. Screamistry)		2025
