= Aviana (band) =

Swedish metalcore band

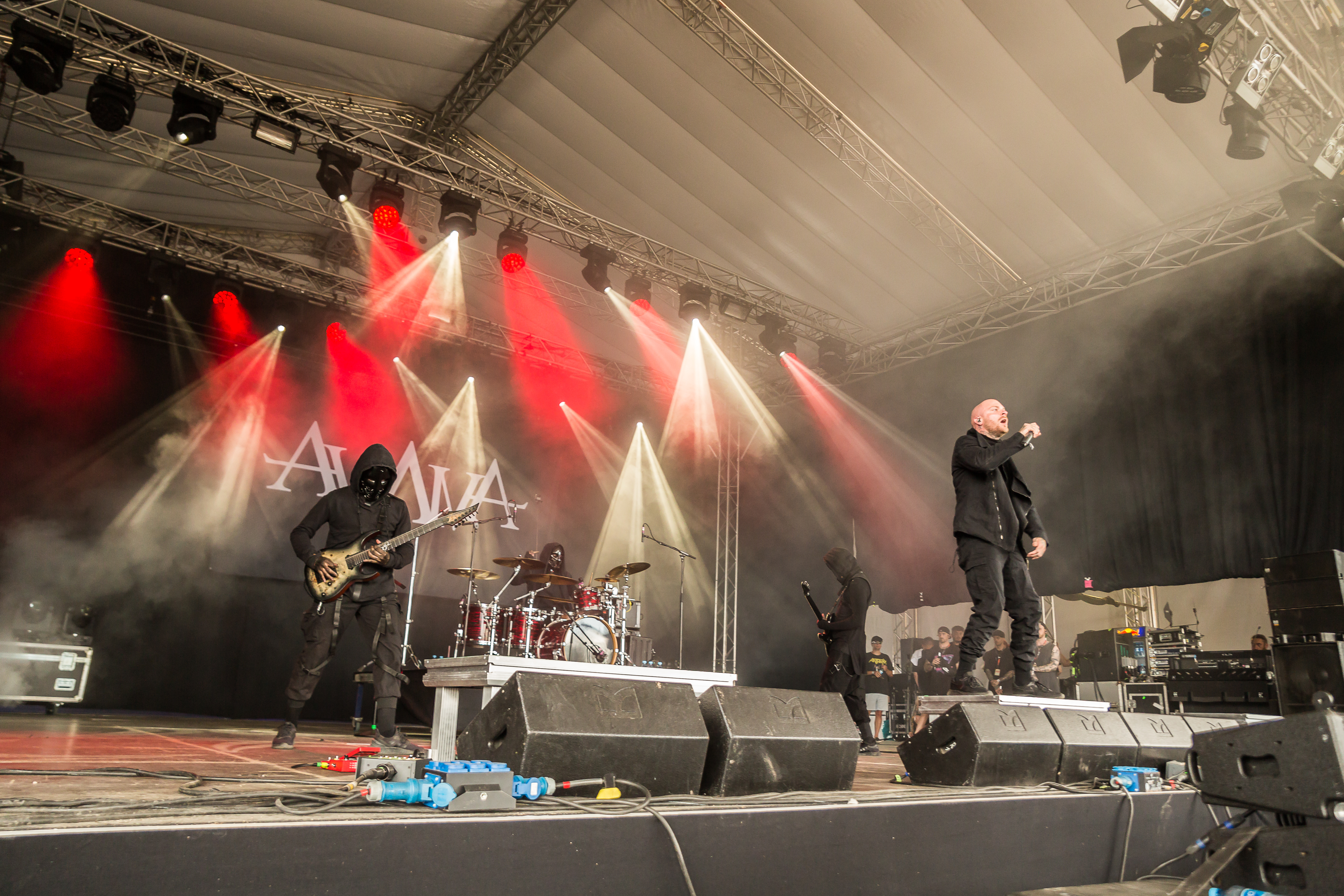
- Aviana performing at Full Force, 2023

Background information
- Origin: Gothenburg, Sweden
- Genres: Metalcore; djent; deathcore
- Years active: 2016–present
- Labels: Rambo; Arising Empire
- Members: Joel Holmqvist; Death; Fear; Dark
- Past members: Marcus Vik; Marcus Heffler; Oscar Forsman; Sebastian Colque; Niclas Bergström
- Website: https://avianaofficial.com/

Aviana logo

Aviana (stylised in all caps) are a Swedish metalcore band from Gothenburg.

== History ==
Aviana formed in 2016 with vocalist Marcus Vik, guitarists Marcus Heffler and Oscar Forsman, bassist Sebastian Colque and drummer Niclas Bergström. Their debut album Polarize was released in 2017. Later that year Vik departed and former Walking with Strangers frontman Joel Holmqvist took over vocals.

The quintet signed to German label Arising Empire and issued second album Epicenter in August 2019, earning a positive print review in Metal Hammer.

In 2020, shortly after Epicenter, Heffler, Forsman, Colque and Bergström all exited, leaving Holmqvist the sole official member. He continued under the Aviana name, releasing the standalone EP Overcome in November 2021.

During 2022 Holmqvist introduced three masked live musicians—known only as Death, Fear and Dark—issued a run of digital singles and compiled them as the third album Corporation (September 2022).

=== 2023–present ===
- 15 September 2023 – single “As Above, So Below”, accompanied by a visualiser video.
- April 2023 – Renormalization Tour of Australia supporting Earth Caller.
- 10 April 2024 – video single “Delirium”.
- 22 November 2024 – single “Father”.
- May–December 2024 – European “Black Tour” with Imminence and Allt.
- 30 January 2025 – single and video “Storm Ablaze”.
- February–March 2025 – main support on Make Them Suffer's first North-American headlining tour.
- March-April 2026 - They joined Caskets as supporting acts for the Silence Follows Tour in the United States and Canada headlined by ERRA and Currents.

== Members ==
Current

- Joel Holmqvist – vocals (2017–present)
- Death – guitar (2020–present)
- Fear – guitar (2020–present)
- Dark – drums (2020–present)

Former

- Marcus Vik – vocals (2016–2017)
- Marcus Heffler – guitar (2016–2020)
- Oscar Forsman – guitar (2016–2019)
- Sebastian Colque – bass (2016–2020)
- Niclas Bergström – drums (2016–2020)

== Discography ==
Studio albums

- Polarize (2017)
- Epicenter (2019)
- Corporation (2022)
- Void (2025)

EPs

- Overcome (2021)
- Obsession (2022)
- Transcendent (2022)

Singles

- “Anomaly” (26 May 2022)
- “As Above, So Below” (15 Sep 2023)
- “Delirium” (4 Oct 2024)
- “Father” (22 Nov 2024)
- “Storm Ablaze” (30 Jan 2025)
- “Evermore” (6 Aug 2025)

Music videos

Title	Year	Ref.
“Heavy Feather”	2019	
“My Worst Enemy”	2019	
“Red Sky”	2019	
“Frail”	2019	
“Retaliation”	2021	
“Oblivion”	2021	
“Rage”	2021	
“Overcome”	2021	
“Obsession”	2022	
“Transcendent”	2022	
“Anomaly”	2022	
“Paradox” (feat. Marcus Vik)	2022	
“Illuminate”	2022	
“As Above, So Below”	2023	
“Delirium”	2024	
“Father”	2024	
“Storm Ablaze”	2025	
“Evermore”	2025	
“World's Pulse” (feat. Eddie Berg)	2025	
