= Impericon Never Say Die! Tour =

Annual European metalcore musical tour

Never Say Die! Tour
- The Impericon Never Say Die! Tour 2011 logo
- Genre: Metalcore, deathcore, hardcore
- Dates: October, November
- Location: Europe
- Years active: 2007–present
- Website: neversaydietour.com

The Never Say Die! Tour (abbreviated NSD) is a metalcore festival that tours European cities every autumn. It is officially named the Impericon Never Say Die! Tour after its sponsor, Leipzig-based retailstore Impericon, which now also organises another like tour called Impericon Festival every spring.

== History ==
The first tour took place in Germany, Luxembourg, Switzerland and Austria in 2008, with the lineup consisting out of Parkway Drive, Unearth, Despised Icon, Architects, Protest the Hero, Whitechapel and Carnifex.

Architects and Despised Icon were the headlining acts for the second tour together with As Blood Runs Black, Horse the Band, Iwrestledabearonce, The Ghost Inside and Oceano. 2009 the tour added Slovenia, Italy, the United Kingdom, the Czech Republic, Belgium and the Netherlands next to Germany, Switzerland, Austria and Luxemburg.

In October and November 2010 the third NSD tour started and first time Sweden and France were venue of the tournee. Parkway Drive, War From a Harlots Mouth, Comeback Kid, Bleeding Through, Emmure, Your Demise and We Came as Romans shared stage together that year.

2011 the fourth tour took place in Germany, Austria, the United Kingdom, Belgium, France, the Czech Republic, Hungary, Italy, Luxembourg, Poland, Switzerland and the Netherlands. The official line up consisted out of Suicide Silence, Vanna, Deez Nuts, Emmure, The Word Alive, As Blood Runs Black and The Human Abstract.

The tour played in many well-known venues around Europe like SO36, Große Freiheit, Dürer Kert and Arena Wien. German music magazine Metal Hammer made a tour report of the 2011s Never Say Die! Tour. Marco Walzl of Avocado Booking was the lead organiser of the Never Say Die! Tour.
