= I See Stars discography =

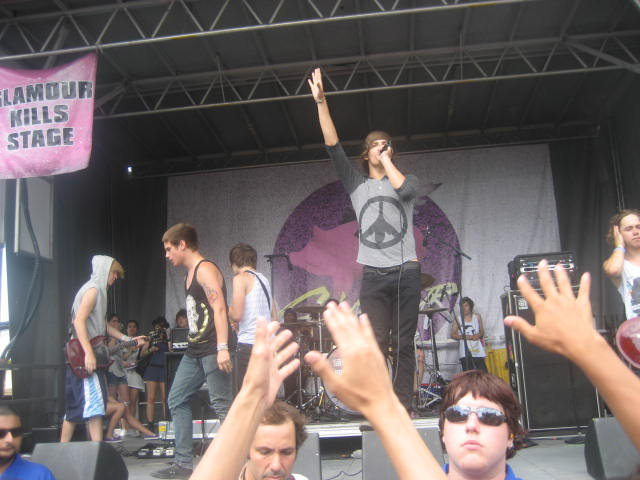
- I See Stars at Warped Tour 2010; From left: Jimmy Gregerson, Zach Johnson, Jeff Valentine, Devin Oliver, and Brent Allen
- Studio albums: 6
- EPs: 2
- Singles: 14
- Music videos: 18
- Remix albums: 3

The discography of I See Stars, an American electronicore band formed in Warren, Michigan, in 2006 consists of six studio albums, three remix albums, two extended plays, and numerous singles and videos. The quartet consists of vocalist Devin Oliver, vocalist and keyboardist Andrew Oliver, lead guitarist Brent Allen, and bassist Jeff Valentine. Chris Moore replaced Johnson in the period of 2009–2010; however, Johnson was later reunited with the band in 2010. However, Johnson left the band once again in 2015, followed shortly after by Gregerson.

The band self-released two extended plays, before signing to Sumerian Records in 2008. Ever since, the band went on to release six studio albums, 3-D (2009), The End of the World Party (2011), Digital Renegade (2012), and New Demons (2013), Treehouse (2016), and THE WHEEL (2025).

== Albums ==
=== Studio albums ===
Year	Title	Label	Chart positions						
Year	Title	Label	Top 200	US Indie	US Heat	US Rock	US Alt	US Digital	US Hard Rock
2009	3-D	Sumerian	176	22	5	—	—	—	—
2011	The End of the World Party	Sumerian	144	18	1	37	23	—	—
2012	Digital Renegade	Sumerian	45	9	—	15	10	24	—
2013	New Demons	Sumerian	28	—	—	2	—	—	5
2016	Treehouse	Sumerian	93	—	—	—	—	—	4
2025	The Wheel	Sumerian	—	—	—	—	—	—	—

=== Remix albums ===
Year	Title	Label	Chart positions
Year	Title	Label	US Dance
2013	Renegades Forever	Sumerian	—
2015	New Demons (Remixes)	Sumerian	10
2015	Phases	Sumerian	—
2018	Treehouse (Acoustic)	Sumerian	—

=== Extended plays ===
Year	Title	Label
2007	Green Light Go!	Self-released
2008	I See Stars	Self-released

== Singles ==
Year	Title	Album
2010	"The End of the World Party"	The End of the World Party
2011	"Wonderland"	The End of the World Party
2012	"Filth Friends Unite"	Digital Renegade
2012	"NZT48"	Digital Renegade
2012	"The Hardest Mistakes" (feat. Cassadee Pope)	Renegades Forever
2013	"Can We Start Again" (feat. Frankie Palmeri & Mattie Montgomery)	Renegades Forever
2013	"Violent Bounce (People Like You)"	New Demons
2013	"Murder Mitten"	New Demons
2013	"New Demons"	New Demons
2016	"Mobbin' Out"	Treehouse
2016	"Running with Scissors"	Treehouse
2023	"Anomaly / Drift"	The Wheel
2023	"are wre 3ven?"	The Wheel
2023	"D4MAGE DONE"	The Wheel
2024	"SPLIT"	The Wheel
2025	"Eliminator"	The Wheel
2025	"Lost It" (feat. Palaye Royale)	The Wheel

== Music videos ==
Title	Year	Director	From the album
"What This Means to Me"	2009	Robby Starbuck	3-D
"3-D"	2010	Spence Nicholson	3-D
"The Common Hours"	2010	Andrew Pulaski	3-D
"The End of the World Party"	2011	Scott Hansen	The End of the World Party
"Wonderland"	2011	Bryce Hall	The End of the World Party
"Glow"	2011	Joe Dietsch	The End of the World Party
"Filth Friends Unite"	2012	Frankie Nasso	Digital Renegade
"NZT48"	2012	Casey Watson	Digital Renegade
"Murder Mitten"	2013		New Demons
"New Demons"	2013	Kevin Joel	New Demons
"Ten Thousand Feet"	2014		New Demons
"Murder Mitten (Raw & Unplugged)"	2015	Ramon Boutviseth	Phases
"Break"	2016	Brandon Bolmer	Treehouse
"Running with Scissors"	2016	Sam Leabo	Treehouse
"Calm Snow"	2016	Jensen Noen	Treehouse
"Everyone's Safe in the Treehouse"	2017	Sam Leabo	Treehouse
"Are We Even?"	2023	Orie McGinness	
"D4MAGE DONE"	2023	Jensen Noen	

== Collaborations ==
Year	Song	Album	Artist
2010	"Cowboy" (feat. Devin Oliver)	Crossroads: 2010	Bizzy Bone
2013	"Small Hinge" (feat. Zach Johnson)	Bullhound Sessions	Captive
2014	"Party Monster" (feat. Devin Oliver & Bertrand Poncet)	Suns of Saturn EP	A War Within
2016	"Standstill" (feat. Devin Oliver)	Through the Storm EP	Of Truth
2016	"44" (feat. Zach Johnson)	ADHD	Guard My Ways
2017	"Just Like Hollywood" (feat. Devin Oliver)	Single	Vegas Lights
2017	"High Horse" (feat. Zach Johnson)	Fortunes EP	Fortunes
2018	"Broken" (feat. Devin Oliver)	Inner Signals	If I Were You
2018	"FOLLOW YOU" (feat. Devin Oliver)	OVERLOAD	Kayzo
2019	"Someone You Loved (Lewis Capaldi Cover)" (feat. Devin Oliver, Telle of The Word Alive & Asia of Ashland)	Single	Our Last Night
