= Cocoon for the Golden Future =

Studio album by Fear, and Loathing in Las Vegas
- Released: October 26, 2022
- Recorded: 2020–2022
- Studios: VICTOR STUDIO; aLIVE RECORDING STUDIO
- Genres: Electronicore; metalcore; post-hardcore; screamo
- Length: 38:35
- Labels: Getting Better; Victor Entertainment
- Producer: Kai Kuzuyama (Warner Music Japan / THIRDFLAG)

Fear, and Loathing in Las Vegas chronology
Hypertoughness (2019)	Cocoon for the Golden Future (2022)

Singles from Cocoon for the Golden Future
- 1. "Shape of Trust" Released: December 16, 2020; 2. "Evolve Forward in Hazard" Released: March 24, 2021; 3. "One Shot, One Mind" Released: April 21, 2021; 4. "Repaint" Released: June 22, 2022; 5. "Tear Down" Released: August 24, 2022; 6. "Get Back the Hope" Released: October 1, 2022

Cocoon for the Golden Future is the seventh full-length album by Japanese electronicore band Fear, and Loathing in Las Vegas. It was released on October 26, 2022 by Getting Better Records (Victor Entertainment).

== Overview ==
This is Fear, and Loathing in Las Vegas' first release in nearly three years, since their previous album Hypertoughness. The CD includes 11 tracks, including five digitally released since 2020: "Shape of Trust," "Evolve Forward in Hazard," "One Shot, One Mind," "Repaint," and "Tear Down," as well as "Get Back the Hope," which was released digitally on October 1.

The album title, "Cocoon for the Golden Future," literally translates to "Cocoon for a Golden Future," and is the result of thinking about the themes of "adapting to a changing environment" and "preparing for the next stage." Minami (keyboards, etc.) said that he felt "Cocoon" was more familiar and easier to understand than "Chrysalis." Additionally, they already have an idea for the title of their next album, and this is also intended as preparation for that.

== Background and production ==
The release gap between this album and the previous one, Hypertoughness, was approximately three years. This was due to the COVID-19 pandemic, which made touring impossible. Minami commented, "Originally, we'd release albums regularly and do release tours... so this was the first time we couldn't do that for three years. We were in a situation where we wondered when we'd be able to release an album and tour again, so I'm happy that we can finally release it. It feels like we can finally do it." On the other hand, the gap also allowed them to take their time creating the album, saying, "We were able to incorporate a variety of new elements, while still retaining a Las Vegas vibe, so I think it's a packed album." The songwriting process remained the same as before, with Minami receiving song themes and images from the band's manager, then creating ideas based on those ideas and working with the manager to bring them to life. Furthermore, the procedures and equipment were more organized than before, and the process of creating phrases for dubbing parts and other aspects of the album had become more stable.

Several new guitars were purchased for the recording of this album, and they were used during dubbing, changing guitars for each phrase, broadening the range of the sound. The manager commented that while producing the previous album, she was mentally exhausted, and upon listening to it again after its release, she noticed a lack of consistency in the guitar tone. She also said that she had been thinking about adding more guitars before recording began for this album. Furthermore, because the digital singles were produced first and new equipment was added each time, the sonic approaches of the songs on the album are different.

== Release format ==
Cocoon for the Golden Future was released on October 26 in five formats: Limited Edition A with Autographs, Limited Edition B with Autographs, Limited Edition A, Limited Edition B, and a standard edition.

The limited edition included live footage from the "Dance & Scream Subscription Release Commemorative Solo Live" held on October 20, 2021, as well as approximately 110 minutes of bonus footage, including tour behind-the-scenes footage from the "FaLiLV Shuffle Tour 2022 Part 1," which took place from March to June 2022, and music videos for three songs scheduled to be included on the album. Additionally, the limited edition came with bonuses such as a 64-photobook featuring behind-the-scenes photos from the "FaLiLV Shuffle Tour 2022," as well as a special lyric book.

The "Autographed Limited Edition," which features the members' autographs in the photobook, was available in limited quantities by pre-order only, with orders closing once the limit had been reached.

Additionally, as a bonus common to all formats, a streaming card that can be used to download the sound effects used in the "Dance & Scream Subscription Release Commemorative Solo Live" and a jacket photo sticker were included.

Format	Specifications	Product Number
Autographed Limited Edition A	CD + BD + Photobook (Autographed)	VIZL-2114
Autographed Limited Edition B	CD + DVD + Photobook (Autographed)	VIZL-2115
Autographed Limited Edition A	CD + BD + Photobook	VIZL-2116
Autographed Limited Edition B	CD + DVD + Photobook	VIZL-2117
Regular Edition	CD	VICL-65738

== Promotion ==
At the Kobe Harbor event on February 26, 2022, the first day of the "FaLiLV Shuffle Tour 2022 Part 1," During a live performance at Studio, it was announced that they would be releasing a new album and going on tour in 2022. Later, on August 30 of the same year, the album title, release date, and release tour schedule were officially announced at the opening performance of the "FaLiLV Shuffle Tour 2022 Part 2" held at Zepp Haneda in Tokyo. On September 15, detailed information about the album's artwork, tracklist, and more was released, along with a trailer for the limited edition, including a snippet of the music video for "Ain't That So Awesome," on their YouTube channel. On October 1, "Get Back the Hope," the lead track from the album, was released in advance on various streaming services, and the music video was also released at the same time.

On October 13, it was announced that posters would be displayed in convenience stores across the country to coincide with the ticket sales for the Cocoon for the Golden Future Release Tour 2022-2023, which was held in conjunction with the album release. In addition, in order to promote the poster development, the artist photo had been edited in some areas, as described below.

Posting Period	Type	Area	Number of Stores
October 11 (Tue) - October 31 (Mon)	A1 Poster	Nagano/Niigata	443
October 11 (Tue) - October 31 (Mon)	A1 Poster	Shizuoka	496
October 11 (Tue) - October 31 (Mon)	A1 Poster	Tokai	2,334
October 11 (Tue) - October 31 (Mon)	Information Board	Tohoku	1,189
October 11 (Tue) - October 31 (Mon)	Information Board	Hokuriku	551
October 11 (Tue) - October 31 (Mon)	Information Board	Chugoku	1,272
October 11 (Tue) - October 31 (Mon)	Information Board	Kyushu	1,078
November 1 (Tue) - November 14 (Mon)	Information Board	Hokkaido	239
November 1 (Tue) - November 14 (Mon)	Information Board	Kanto/Yamanashi	5,594
November 1 (Tue) - November 14 (Mon)	A1 Poster	Kansai	2,649

On the same day, a special page was launched on the web media "Gekirock" to commemorate the release of this album. At the same time, the first part of an interview with Minami and the band's manager was released, with the second part to follow on October 25, and the third installment on November 10.

To commemorate the release of this album, a special program called "RADIVEGAS Special" aired on October 23 on Kiss FM KOBE, the radio station in their hometown of Hyogo, in which the band members talked about the album, their solo tour, "MEGA VEGAS", and more. The new song "Trap by the Nervous" included in the album was premiered in a radio edit. In addition, the members were scheduled to appear on local radio programs around the time of the album's release, as described below.

Date and time	Station/Media	program	Appearance
October 20 (Thursday)	ZIP-FM	LACHIC CENTURY SESSION	So
October 23 (Sunday)	Kiss FM KOBE	RADIGAS Special	So, Taiki, Tomonori, Tetsuya
October 24 (Monday)	K-mix	K-mix Wiz.	So
October 25 (Tuesday)	FM802	EVENING TAP	So, Taiki
October 27 (Thursday)	17LIVE	Takanori Nishikawa's Nishina LIVE	So, Taiki
October 28 (Friday)	ZIP-FM	ESSENTIAL MUSIC	So
October 31 (Monday)	RKB Radio	Sae no Waffle	So
November 4 (Friday)	ZIP-FM	ESSENTIAL MUSIC	So
November 4 (Friday)	CROSS FM	FRIDAY SPECIAL BAYSIDE SHOCK	So (Telephone appearance)
Saturday, November 5	AIR-G’	Dragon, Spread, Scatter	So (Comment only)
Wednesday, November 16	FM Osaka	J3 Wednesday ~Midnight Master Key~	So, Taiki

To commemorate the album's release, a live photo panel exhibition is being held at Tower Records locations in Shinjuku, Shibuya, Akihabara, Nagoya Parco, Umeda NU Chayamachi, and Kobe from October 25 to November 7 (until October 31 at Nagoya Parco).

== Ratings & results ==
=== Chart results ===
According to the Oricon Chart, the album sold 5,892 copies in its first week (as of November 7, 2022), ranking 13th on the Oricon Weekly CD Album Rankings. This is the first time since "NEXTREME" officially began appearing on the Oricon Charts that the album has not yet reached the Top 10. In the "Oricon Weekly Combined Album Rankings," it achieved 6,683 points in its first week, ranking 13th. Meanwhile, according to Billboard JAPAN, the album sold 6,012 copies in its first week (published November 2, 2022), ranking 8th on the Billboard Japan Top Album Sales, marking the album's seventh consecutive Top 10 appearance since "NEXTREME."

=== Reviews ===
Mayu Yamamoto of Gekirock's editorial department commented, "This album is like a further blossoming of their insatiable curiosity." She also commented, "While incorporating flashy and glittering elements like '80s/'90s revivals like disco and Eurobeat, as well as trendy EDM and k-pop, the guitars are firmly metal, and the heavy parts are subdued, providing a solid transition in tempo that never gets boring. It's also impressive how the rap and lyrics are tackled in earnest, without being merely a joke. This work once again reminds us of the magnitude of the band Fear, and Loathing in Las Vegas, who defy convention."

Music writer Ryosuke Arakane commented in Real Sound, "Cocoon for the Golden Future definitely feels like it captures the next phase of Las Vegas," and praised the album, saying, "It has incredible power that far surpasses their previous works."

Music writer Tetsuo Yamaguchi commented, "The album is a whirlwind of 11 tracks, including 'Ain't That So Awesome,' which incorporates Korean language elements and strengthens the dance music elements, the heavy metalcore-heavy 'Tear Down,' and 'Interude,' which also features jazz elements, and a euphoric closer that will leave you in awe." He also praised the album, saying, "While unfolding their signature high-voltage chaos, the album is more crisp and dramatic than ever before."

Writer Yako Ryuji commented on rockin'on, "This first full-length album in about three years is an explosion of pent-up frustration and the imagination they've built up over that time, featuring 11 diverse, high-energy tracks that further refine their sound, blending loud and electro." He also commented, "There's a reason they continue to shine like no other in a world where loud music can often sound the same. Next year will mark their 15th year since formation, but they still give the impression of limitless potential."

== Track listing ==
CD
No.	Title	Length
1.	"Get Back the Hope"	3:08
2.	"Evolve Forward in Hazard"	3:26
3.	"Shape of Trust"	3:43
4.	"Ain't That So Awesome"	3:39
5.	"One Shot, One Mind"	3:33
6.	"Interlude"	2:12
7.	"Tear Down"	3:51
8.	"Repaint"	3:52
9.	"Gas Will Blow You Away as Only Brakes is Boring"	3:42
10.	"Trap by the Nervous"	3:45
11.	"Luck Will Be There"	3:40
Total length:		38:35

=== Limited edition bonus ===
Blu-ray / DVD disc one
No.	Title	Length
1.	"Burn the Disco Floor with Your "2-step"!!"
2.	"Hey Girl!! Why Not Party Like a Bitch!?"
3.	"Rave-up Tonight"
4.	"Take me out!!"
5.	"Evolve Forward in Hazard"
6.	"Stray in Chaos"
7.	"Shape of Trust"
8.	"Just Awake"
9.	"Beyond the End"
10.	"Why Couldn't I Say The Last Goodbye to You?"
11.	"Keep the Heat and Fire Yourself Up"
12.	"Because You Are Here"
13.	"One Shot, One Mind"
14.	"My Dear Lady, Will You Dance With Me Tonight?"
15.	"Solitude X'mas"
16.	"The Sun Also Rises"
17.	"Twilight"
18.	"Love at First Sight"

Blu-ray / DVD disc two
No.	Title	Length
1.	"FaLiLV Shuffle Tour 2022 BEHIND THE SCENE SHOTS (BEHIND THE SCENE SHOTS)"
2.	"Tear Down" (#2-4: Music Video)
3.	"Get Back the Hope"
4.	"Ain't That So Awesome"

== Personnel ==
Fear, and Loathing in Las Vegas

- So - clean vocals, backing unclean vocals, guitar (track 1), wind synthesizer (track 10)
- Minami - unclean vocals, rap vocals, keyboards, guitar (track 8)
- Taiki - guitars, unclean vocals, backing vocals, rap vocals (track 4)
- Tomonori - drums, percussion
- Tetsuya - bass guitar, backing vocals, rap vocals (track 4)

Design

- Yutty (KISS OF DEATH) - art direction and design
- Yuji Ono - photography
- Yusaku Ishimaru -Hair and makeup
- Kentaro Harada - Styling

Production

- Kai Kuzuyama - Direction and maanagement
- Yasuhisa Kataoka - Recording and mixing
- Tucky (Tucky's Mastering Inc) - Mastering
- Akira Omachi -Instruments sound co-ordinate

Additional personnel

- Chisa Koune - A&R
- Yusuke Iwata - Product manager
- Yohei Saito - Sales promotion
- Kenji Ibata = Digital Promotion
- Yuichiro Soshi - Package Coordination
- Nana Nishizawa - Package Coordination

== Chart ==
"Cocoon for the Golden Future" Chart (2022)
Chart	Highest Ranking
Oricon Daily Album	4
Oricon Weekly CD Album	13
Oricon Combined Album	13
Oricon Rock Album	2
Oricon Digital Album	9
Billboard Japan Hot Albums	10
Billboard Japan Top Albums Sales	8
Billboard Japan Download Albums	11
