= Phases (I See Stars album) =

Remix album by I See Stars
- Released: August 28, 2015
- Length: 38:18
- Label: Sumerian
- Producer: Nick Scott

I See Stars chronology
New Demons (2013)	Phases (2015)	Treehouse (2016)

Singles from Phases
- 1. "Murder Mitten" Released: 31 July 2015; 2. "Latch" Released: 7 August 2015

Phases is the third remix album by American electronicore band I See Stars, released through Sumerian Records on August 28, 2015. The album features "raw and unplugged" versions of some of the band's previously recorded material, as well as some cover songs. The album is entirely composed of acoustic guitars and basses, pianos, and stringed instruments accompanied by Devin and Andrew Oliver's singing, in place of the screaming, breakdowns, and electronics typically used by the band.

On September 25, 2015, the band embarked on the Phases tour in promotion of the album. Appropriately, the tour only featured the versions of songs performed on Phases and did not feature the entire band, leading to departure rumors of keyboardist and unclean vocalist Zach Johnson and guitarist Jimmy Gregerson. Gregerson's departure was later confirmed, followed by Johnson's a short while later.

== Track listing ==
All tracks except for 3, 6, 8, and 10 written by I See Stars; lyrics written by Andrew and Devin Oliver.

No.	Title	Length
1.	"Murder Mitten" (originally from New Demons)	4:03
2.	"The Common Hours" (originally from 3D)	3:10
3.	"Youth" (Daughter cover)	4:10
4.	"Digital Renegade" (originally from Digital Renegade)	2:26
5.	"3D" (originally from 3D)	2:21
6.	"Latch" (Disclosure cover)	4:20
7.	"New Demons" (originally from New Demons)	4:52
8.	"Take Me to Church" (Hozier cover)	3:53
9.	"Glow" (originally from The End of the World Party)	2:51
10.	"Your Love" (The Outfield cover; originally from Punk Goes Classic Rock)	3:41
11.	"What This Means to Me" (originally from 3D)	3:33
Total length:		38:18

== Chart performance ==
Chart (2015)	Peak position
US Billboard Independent Albums	26
US Billboard Top Rock Albums	41

== Personnel ==
Credits were adapted from AllMusic.

I See Stars

- Devin Oliver – lead vocals
- Brent Allen – guitars
- Jeff Valentine – bass guitar
- Andrew Oliver – drums, percussion, backing vocals

Additional personnel

- Nick Scott – producing, co-writing, mixing, mastering, additional guitar
- Jake Burkey – additional percussion
- Christopher Coo – piano, keyboards
- Jacob Halmich – cello
