= Rave-up Tonight =

EP by Fear, and Loathing in Las Vegas
- Released: 15 January 2014
- Studio: Innig Studio; Prime Sound Studio Form; Parasight
- Genre: Post-hardcore; electronicore; dubstep; electronic
- Length: 25:06
- Label: VAP

Fear, and Loathing in Las Vegas chronology
All That We Have Now (2012)	Rave-up Tonight (2014)	Phase 2 (2014)

Rave-up Tonight is the ninth EP by Japanese electronicore band Fear, and Loathing in Las Vegas. It was released on 15 January 2014 through VAP. It features remixes of songs from Dance & Scream, Nextreme, and All That We Have Now. The EP debuted at number 3 on Oricon chart with sales of 19,409 copies in Japan in its first week release. A music video of "Rave-up Tonight" was nominated for the 2014 Space Shower Music Awards for Best Video category. The song was used as the theme song for arcade game Mobile Suit Gundam: Extreme Vs. Maxi Boost.

== Track listing ==
No.	Title	Length
1.	"Rave-up Tonight"	3:24
2.	"The Courage to Take Action"	3:15
3.	"Step of Terror"	3:29
4.	"Ley-Line" (Boom Boom Satellites remix)	5:09
5.	"My Dear Lady, Will You Dance with Me Tonight?" (Takkyu Ishino's Rave 1991 remix)	5:30
6.	"Chase the Light!" (Hyadain No Ri Ri Ri Ri ☆ remix)	4:18
Total length:		25:06

== Personnel ==
Fear, and Loathing in Las Vegas

- So – clean vocals, backing unclean vocals, programming
- Minami – unclean vocals, rapping, keyboards, programming
- Sxun – lead guitar, backing vocals
- Taiki – rhythm guitar, backing vocals
- Kei – bass
- Tomonori – drums, percussion

== Charts ==
=== Song ===
Title	Year	Peak positions	
Title	Year	JPN Oricon	JPN Billboard
"Rave-up Tonight"	2014	3	7

== Certifications ==
Region	Certification	Certified units/sales
Japan	—	19,409

== Awards and nominations ==
Year	Award	Category	Work/Nominee	Result
2014	Space Shower Music Awards	Best Video	"Rave-up Tonight"	Nominated
