= Phase 2 (album) =

Studio album by Fear, and Loathing in Las Vegas
- Released: 6 August 2014
- Studio: Innig Studio; Prime Sound Studio Form; Parasight
- Genre: Post-hardcore; electronicore; metalcore; easycore; electropop
- Length: 40:15
- Label: VAP
- Producer: Yasuhisa Kataoka

Fear, and Loathing in Las Vegas chronology
Rave-up Tonight (2014)	Phase 2 (2014)	Feeling of Unity (2015)

Singles from Phase 2
- 1. "Rave-up Tonight" Released: 25 January 2014

Phase 2 (stylised in all caps) is the third studio album by Japanese electronicore band Fear, and Loathing in Las Vegas. It was released on 6 August 2014 through VAP. It debuted at number 4 on Oricon chart with sales of 21,978 copies in Japan in its opening week. The single for the album, "Rave-up Tonight", was released on 25 January 2014. Its music video was nominated for the 2014 Space Shower Music Awards for Best Video category. "Rave-up Tonight" was used as theme song for arcade game Mobile Suit Gundam: Extreme Vs. Maxi Boost. Other songs of the album, "Virtue and Vice", was featured as the opening theme for anime Brynhildr in the Darkness, while "Thunderclap" was chosen for the opening theme for anime Sengoku Basara: End of Judgement.

== Track listing ==
No.	Title	Length
1.	"Are You Ready to Blast Off?"	1:52
2.	"Rave-up Tonight"	3:22
3.	"Swing It!!"	3:38
4.	"Thunderclap"	3:39
5.	"Interlude"	2:17
6.	"Virtue and Vice"	3:25
7.	"Nail the Shit Down"	3:32
8.	"Rain Inside Your Eyes"	3:50
9.	"Counterattack by the Sesame Sized Bodies"	3:39
10.	"Flutter of Cherry Blossom"	3:35
11.	"Stay as Who You Are"	7:21
Total length:		40:15

== Personnel ==
Fear, and Loathing in Las Vegas

- So – clean vocals, backing unclean vocals, programming
- Minami – unclean vocals, rapping, keyboards, programming
- Sxun – lead guitar, backing vocals
- Taiki – rhythm guitar, backing vocals
- Kei – bass
- Tomonori – drums, percussion

Additional personnel

- Yasuhisa Kataoka – production, mixing
- Tuckey – mastering
- Yutty – art direction, design
- Yuji Ono – photography

== Charts ==
=== Album ===
Chart (2014)	Peak position
Japanese Albums (Billboard)	4
Japanese Albums (Oricon)	4

=== Single ===
Title	Year	Peak positions	
Title	Year	JPN Oricon	JPN Billboard
"Rave-up Tonight"	2014	3	7

== Certifications ==
Region	Certification	Certified units/sales
Japan	—	31,995

== Awards and nominations ==
Year	Award	Category	Work/Nominee	Result
2014	Space Shower Music Awards	Best Video	"Rave-up Tonight"	Nominated
