= Fear, and Loathing in Las Vegas =

Japanese electronicore band

- Also known as: FALILV
- Origin: Kobe, Japan
- Genres: Electronicore; post-hardcore; metalcore; dance-metal; trancecore
- Years active: 2008–present
- Labels: VAP; Warner Music Japan; Getting Better
- Members: Minami; Taiki; Tomonori; So; Tetsuya
- Past members: Mashu; Sxun; Kei
- Website: lasvegas-jp.com

Fear, and Loathing in Las Vegas (Japanese: フィアー・アンド・ロージング・イン・ラスベガス, Hepburn: Fiā ando Rōjingu in Rasu Begasu) is a Japanese electronicore band from Kobe that was formed in summer 2008. The band currently consists of vocalist So, keyboardist Minami, guitarist Taiki, drummer Tomonori, and bassist Tetsuya. They are best known for their heavy use of vocoder and synthesizer blended with emo/metalcore music and rave beats.

== History ==
Band's first logo

Founded in 2008 summer, the band was originally formed by members of the bands Ending for a Start and Blank Time. A year later, after an extensive search, So (former member of Bombreligion) joined as the sixth member.

In 2010, PAC started using their song "Evolution (Entering the New World)" as his theme music when wrestling in Dragon Gate.

In 2011, the song "Jump Around" from the band's EP Nextreme was selected to appear in the video game Pro Evolution Soccer 2012 (in Asia: World Soccer: Winning Eleven 2012) as the fourth track. The song "Chase the Light!" was used as the opening theme for Gyakkyō Burai Kaiji: Hakairoku-hen (逆境無頼カイジ 破戒録篇 lit. Suffering Outcast Kaiji: Maverick Arc). In late 2011, the band's song "Just Awake" was featured as the closing song in the Hunter × Hunter reboot anime; as a single it was released later in 2012.

On 22 June 2012, the band announced that they would be releasing their second studio album on 8 August, titled All That We Have Now, with a tour in September.

In April 2013, the band announced the release of their first DVD, called The Animals in Screen, scheduled to be out on 26 June. On 26 October, they announced a new single, "Rave-up Tonight", expected to be released on 15 January 2014, which is to be the theme song for Gundam Extreme VS. Maxi Boost. In September 2013, the founding bassist Mashu left the band, as a result, on their official website announced on 23 September 2013 that Kei replaced Mashu as the new bassist.

On 23 March 2014, the band announced that they would be releasing a new album that summer. The album release was announced at the Kobe World Memorial Hall live during their first headlining show. As a result, they began a new tour. The song "Virtue and Vice" is featured as the opening theme for Gokukoku no Brynhildr and the song "Thunderclap" was made by the band for the third anime season of Sengoku Basara, subtitled Judge End. Both songs are taken from their third album, Phase 2. On 5 September, the band announced on their official site that they would release a new limited single on 7 January 2015 called "Let Me Hear". On 8 October, the short version of their new single premiered as the opening theme of Parasyte.

On 13 May 2015, the band released a new limited singles "Starburst" and "Struggle to Survive". A few days after the release of "Starburst", the band announced on their official site that they would be releasing their fourth studio album that autumn including the two main songs from their last two singles, "Starburst" and "Let Me Hear". On 12 August, the band released a new PV for the song "Cast Your Shell" which also was included to the album. On 16 August, they announced the title of the album as being Feeling of Unity which was released on 30 September 2015.

In 2017, the band signed onto a new label with Warner Music Japan. On 2 April 2017, the band announced on their official site the trailer for their new single, "Shine" on 23 June. On 26 May, they released a trailer for a PV for the song "Shine" with the full version being released the following month. The second single "Return to Zero" was released on 11 July. On 11 October, an PV was released for their new song "LLLD" which is featured on their newest fifth studio album New Sunrise. On 23 October, they released another new PV titled "The Sun Also Rises" which is the final track of the album. New Sunrise was released 25 October 2017 and includes the songs "Shine" and "Return to Zero".

On 31 January 2018, the band released a new PV for the song "Keep the Heat and Fire Yourself Up" which is also the opening for the anime Hakyū Hōshin Engi. The full single was released 2 May 2018. The band also provided "The Gong of Knockout" for the second opening for Netflix and TMS Entertainment's anime adaptation of Baki the Grappler in 2018. On 30 June, their official website announced that the guitarist, Sxun had left the band due to personal circumstances.

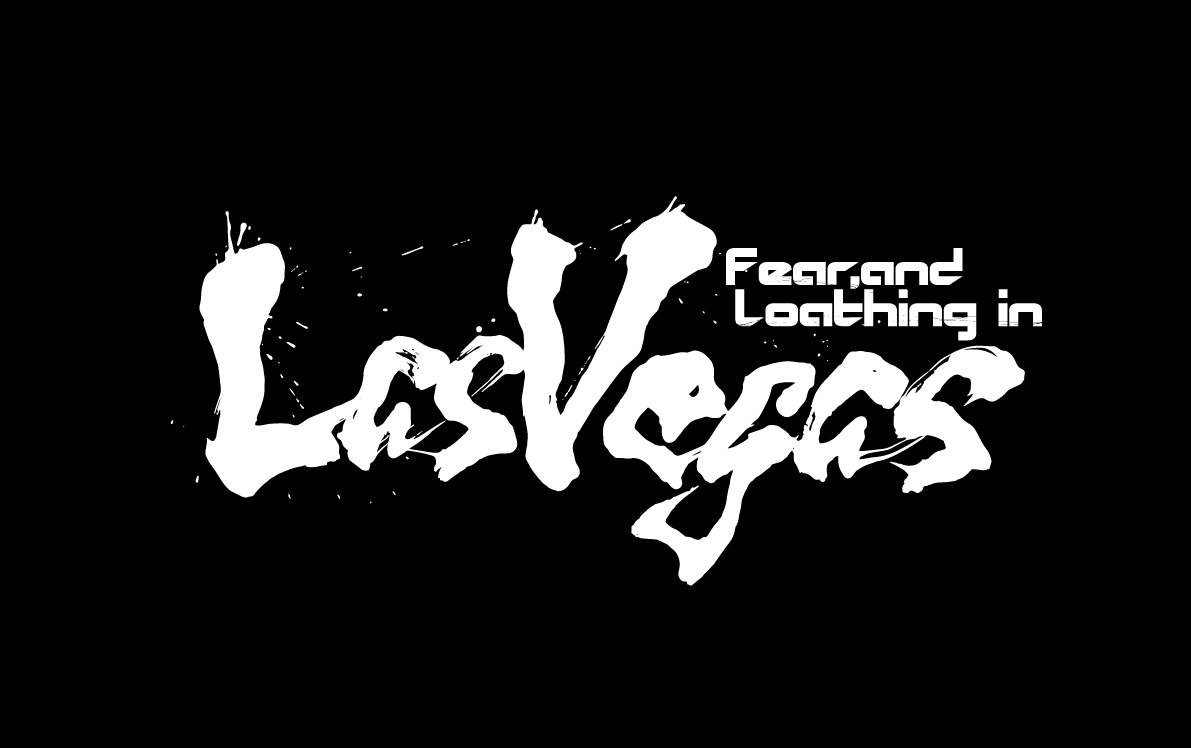
Band's 2019 logo

On 16 January 2019, the band's official website announced the bassist, Kei, had died due to acute heart failure at his home on the night of January 12th. This led to them cancelling the upcoming release of their next album and their spring tour, although they announced that it wouldn't be a permanent end to the band's activities.

On 19 March, the band's official website announced to hold a tribute concert "Thanks to You All" in the memory of Kei on 7 June 2019 at the "Namba Hatch". The reason they chose "Namba Hatch" was because it was Kei's first live performance for the band. On 29 June, the band's official website announced that Tetsuya replaced Kei as the new bassist. On 4 December, the band released their sixth studio album titled Hypertoughness in Japan with an announcement that the worldwide release date is set on 15 January 2020.

== Musical style ==
The band's musical style has been described as electronicore, post-hardcore, metalcore, dance-metal, and screamo.

== Band members ==
Current

- Minami – unclean vocals, keyboards, programming (2008–present)
- Taiki – rhythm guitar (2008–present); backing vocals (2012–present); lead guitar (2018–present)
- Tomonori – drums (2008–present)
- So – clean vocals, programming (2009–present)
- Tetsuya – bass, backing vocals (2019–present)

Former

- Mashu – bass (2008–2013)
- Sxun – lead guitar (2008–2018); clean vocals (2008–2009); backing vocals (2009–2018)
- Kei – bass (2013–2019; his death); backing vocals (2018–2019)

== Discography ==
=== Studio albums ===
Title	Album details	Peak position	Sales
Title	Album details	JPN	Sales
Dance & Scream	Released: 24 November 2010; Label: VAP; Formats: CD, digital download	—	—N/a
All That We Have Now	Released: 8 August 2012; Label: VAP; Formats: CD, digital download	4	23,525
PHASE 2	Released: 6 August 2014; Label: VAP; Formats: CD, digital download	4	21,978
Feeling of Unity	Released: 30 September 2015; Label: VAP; Formats: CD, digital download	2	—N/a
New Sunrise	Released: 25 October 2017; Label: Warner Music Japan; Formats: CD, digital download	5	10,132+
HYPERTOUGHNESS	Released: 4 December 2019 (JPN); 15 January 2020 (NA, UK, EU); Label: Warner Music Japan; Formats: CD, digital download	10	11,835
Cocoon for the Golden Future	Released: 26 October 2022; Label: Getting Better; Formats: CD, digital download	13	—N/a
StandBy	Released: 20 May 2026; Label: Getting Better; Formats: CD, digital download	15	—N/a

=== Extended plays ===
Title	EP details	Peak position
Title	EP details	JPN
Scorching Epochal Sensation	Released: 2008; Label: Independent music; Format: CD	—
Burn the Disco Floor With Your 2-Step	Released: November 2009; Label: Independent music; Format: CD	—
Evolution~Entering the New World~	Released: 16 February 2010; Label: Independent music; Format: CD	—
Take Me Out!! // Twilight	Released: 29 May 2010; Label: Independent music; Formats: CD	—
NEXTREME	Released: 13 July 2011; Label: VAP; Formats: CD, digital download	8
Just Awake	Released: 11 January 2012; Label: VAP; Formats: CD, digital download	8
Just Awake / Acceleration	Released: 23 July 2012; Label: VAP; Formats: CD, digital download	—
Rave-up Tonight	Released: 15 January 2014; Label: VAP; Formats: CD, digital download	3
Let Me Hear	Released: 7 January 2015; Label: VAP; Formats: CD, digital download	3
Starburst	Released: 13 May 2015; Label: VAP; Formats: CD, digital download	6
SHINE	Released: 14 June 2017; Label: Warner Music Japan; Formats: CD, digital download	7
Greedy	Released: 2 May 2018; Label: Warner Music Japan; Formats: CD, digital download	10

=== Live albums ===
Title	Album details	Peak position
Title	Album details	JPN
The Animals in Screen	Released: 26 June 2013; Label: VAP; Formats: DVD, Blu-ray, CD, digital download	13 (DVD); 16 (BD)
The Animals in Screen II	Released: 27 April 2016; Label: VAP; Formats: DVD, Blu-ray, CD, digital download	12 (DVD); 14 (BD)
The Animals in Screen III	Released: 16 January 2019; Label: Warner Music Japan; Formats: DVD, Blu-ray, CD, digital download	7 (DVD); 9 (BD)
The Animals in Screen Bootleg 1	Released: 7 July 2021; Label: Warner Music Japan; Formats: DVD, Blu-ray, CD, digital download	13 (DVD); 20 (BD)
The Animals in Screen Bootleg 2	Released: 1 September 2021; Label: Warner Music Japan; Formats: DVD, Blu-ray, CD, digital download	6 (DVD); 12 (BD)
The Animals in Screen Ultra Bootleg	Released: 28 June 2023; Label: Getting Better; Formats: DVD, Blu-ray	— (DVD) — (BD)
The Animals in Screen IV	Released: 19 June 2024; Label: Getting Better; Formats: DVD, Blu-ray	10 (DVD); 15 (BD)

=== Singles ===
Title	Year	Peak position		Notes	Album
Title	Year	JPN Oricon	JPN Billboard	Notes	Album
"Burn the Disco Floor with Your 2-Step!!"	2009	—	—		Dance & Scream
"Evolution: Entering the New World"	2010	—	—	Pac's theme music when wrestling in Dragon Gate.	Evolution: Entering the New World
"Take Me Out!!"	2010	—	—		Dance & Scream
"Twilight"	2010	—	—		Dance & Scream
"Just Awake"	2012	8	24	Ending theme for anime Hunter × Hunter (2011).	All That We Have Now
"Rave-up Tonight"	2014	3	7	Theme song for Gundam Extreme VS. Maxi Boost.	PHASE 2
"Let Me Hear"	2015	3	7	Opening theme for anime Parasyte.	Feeling of Unity
"Starburst"	2015	6	—		Feeling of Unity
"SHINE"	2017	7	36		New Sunrise
"Return to Zero"	2017	—	—		New Sunrise
"Greedy"	2018	10	32		Greedy
"The Gong of Knockout"	2018	—	—	Opening theme for anime Baki the Grappler.	HYPERTOUGHNESS
"Be Affected" (with Takanori Nishikawa)	2018	—	—	Ending theme for anime Gakuen Basara.	Non-album single
"The Stronger, the Further You'll Be"	2019	—	—		HYPERTOUGHNESS
"Massive Core"	2019	—	—		HYPERTOUGHNESS
"Shape of Trust"	2020	—	—		Cocoon for the Golden Future
"Evolve Forward in Hazard"	2021	—	—		Cocoon for the Golden Future
"One Shot, One Mind"	2021	—	—		Cocoon for the Golden Future
"Repaint"	2022	—	—		Cocoon for the Golden Future
"Tear Down"	2022	—	—		Cocoon for the Golden Future
"Get Back the Hope"	2022	—	—		Cocoon for the Golden Future
"Dive in Your Faith"	2023	—	—		StandBy
"Fist for the New Era"	2024	—	—		StandBy
"Song of Steelers"	2025	—	—		StandBy
"Until You Die Out"	2025	—	—	Ending theme for anime Ninja vs. Gokudo.	StandBy
"Overwrite"	2026	—	—		StandBy

=== Music videos ===
Year	Song	Director(s)	Album	Link
2009	"Why Couldn't I Say the Last Goodbye to You?"	Unknown	Burn the Disco Floor with Your 2-Step!!	
2010	"Stray in Chaos"	Suzuki Daishin	Dance & Scream	
2010	"Love at First Sight"	Suzuki Daishin	Dance & Scream	
2011	"Chase the Light!"	Suzuki Daishin	Nextreme	
2011	"Jump Around"	Suzuki Daishin	Nextreme	
2011	"Shake Your Body"	Suzuki Daishin	Nextreme	
2012	"Just Awake" (English version)	Hiroshi Moriyama	Just Awake / Acceleration	
2012	"Crossover"	Suzuki Daishin	All That We Have Now	
2012	"Scream Hard as You Can"	Suzuki Daishin	All That We Have Now	
2012	"Ley-Line"	Wakame	All That We Have Now	
2013	"Step of Terror"	Unknown	Rave Up Tonight	
2014	"Rave-up Tonight"	Suzuki Daishin	Phase 2	
2014	"Virtue and Vice"	Suzuki Daishin	Phase 2	
2014	"Thunderclap"	Suzuki Daishin	Phase 2	
2014	"Swing It!!"	Suzuki Daishin	Phase 2	
2014	"Let Me Hear"	Suzuki Daishin & Takayuki Kojima	Feeling of Unity	
2015	"Starburst"	Suzuki Daishin	Feeling of Unity	
2015	"Cast Your Shell"	Suzuki Daishin	Feeling of Unity	
2015	"Party Boys"	Unknown	Feeling of Unity	
2017	"Shine"	Suzuki Daishin	New Sunrise	
2017	"Return to Zero"	Unknown	New Sunrise	
2017	"LLLD"	Koh Yamada/Hiroya Brian	New Sunrise	
2017	"The Sun Also Rises"	Suzuki Daishin	New Sunrise	
2018	"Keep the Heat and Fire Yourself Up"	Inni Vision	Hypertoughness	
2018	"Treasure in Your Hands"	Inni Vision	Hypertoughness	
2019	"The Stronger, the Further You'll Be"	Inni Vision	Hypertoughness	
2019	"Massive Core"	Inni Vision	Hypertoughness	
2020	"The Gong of Knockout"	Unknown	Hypertoughness	
2022	"Tear Down"	Inni Vision	Cocoon for the Golden Future	
2022	"Get Back the Hope"	Inni Vision	Cocoon for the Golden Future	
2023	"Dive in Your Faith"	Inni Vision	StandBy	
2024	"Fist for the New Era"	Inni Vision	StandBy	
2025	"Song of Steelers"	Inni Vision	StandBy	
2025	"Until You Die Out"	Unknown	StandBy	
2026	"Overwrite"	Unknown	StandBy	

== Concert tours ==
=== Japanese tours ===
- Summer Sonic Festival with Various Artists (2011)
- Punkspring with Various Artists (2012)
- Summer Sonic Festival with Various Artists (2012)
- Punkspring with Various Artists (2013)
- Ozzfest Japan with Various Artists (2013)
- Summer Sonic Festival with Various Artists (2014)
- Monster Energy Outburn Tour with Various Artists (2014)
- Rising Sun Rock Festival with Various Artists (2015)
- Ozzfest Japan with Various Artists (2015)
- Summer Sonic Festival with Various Artists (2017)
- Fall Out Boy "Mania Tour" with Fear, and Loathing in Las Vegas as supporting act (2018)

=== World tours ===
- Ultra Korea in South Korea with Various Artists (2014)
- Heart-Town Festival in Taiwan with Various Artists (2015)
- Pentaport Rock Festival in South Korea with Various Artists (2015)
- Fear, and Loathing in Las Vegas – Live in Paris in France (2015)
- Megaport Music Festival in Taiwan with Various Artists (2017)

== Awards and nominations ==
Year	Award	Category	Work/Nominee	Result
2012	CD Shop Awards	New Blood	Nextreme	Won
2013	CD Shop Awards	Grand Prix	All That We Have Now	Nominated
2014	Space Shower Music Awards	Best Video	"Rave-up Tonight"	Nominated
2016	Space Shower Music Awards	Best Punk / Loud Rock Artist	Fear, and Loathing in Las Vegas	Nominated

== See also ==
- Japanese rock
- Electrocore
