= New Sunrise =

Studio album by Fear, and Loathing in Las Vegas
- Released: 25 October 2017
- Genre: Electronicore; easycore; post-hardcore; metalcore
- Length: 38:45
- Label: Warner Music Japan

Fear, and Loathing in Las Vegas chronology
Feeling of Unity (2015)	New Sunrise (2017)	Hypertoughness (2019)

Singles from New Sunrise
- 1. "Shine" Released: 23 June 2017; 2. "Return to Zero" Released: 11 July 2017

New Sunrise is the fifth studio album by Japanese electronicore band Fear, and Loathing in Las Vegas. It was released on 25 October 2017 through Warner Music Japan. It is the first release on this label since the band's departure from VAP. It also the last album to feature founding lead guitarist Sxun, who left the band due to personal circumstances. It is also the last one to feature their second bassist Kei, who died due to an acute heart failure at his home on midnight of 12 January.

== Background and promotion ==
In 2017, the band signed onto a new label with Warner Music Japan. On 2 April 2017, the band announced on their official site the trailer for their new single, "Shine" on 23 June. On 26 May, they released a trailer for a PV for the song "Shine" with the full version being released the following month. The second single "Return to Zero" was released on 11 July. On 11 October, an PV was released for their new song "LLLD" which is featured on the album. On 23 October, they released another new PV titled "The Sun Also Rises" which is the final track of the album.

== Track listing ==
No.	Title	Length
1.	"Return to Zero"	3:43
2.	"Before I Fail"	3:48
3.	"Power of Life and Death"	3:22
4.	"LLLD"	3:17
5.	"To Catch the Right Way"	3:32
6.	"Interlude"	2:05
7.	"Shine"	3:54
8.	"Set Your Goal"	3:32
9.	"Accept Each Other's Sense of Values"	3:47
10.	"Fight Against the Limit"	3:45
11.	"The Sun Also Rises"	4:00
Total length:		38:45

== Personnel ==
Fear, and Loathing in Las Vegas

- So – clean vocals, backing unclean vocals, programming
- Minami – unclean vocals, rapping, keyboards, programming
- Sxun – lead guitar, backing vocals
- Taiki – rhythm guitar, backing vocals
- Kei – bass
- Tomonori – drums, percussion

== Charts ==
=== Album ===
Chart (2017)	Peak position
Japanese Albums (Oricon)	5

=== Singles ===
Title	Year	Peak positions	
Title	Year	JPN Oricon	JPN Billboard
"Shine"	2017	7	36

== Certifications ==
Region	Certification	Certified units/sales
Japan	—	10,132
