= Synthcore =

Synthcore may refer to:

- Electroclash, also known as synthcore, a genre of music that fuses 1980s electro, new wave and synth-pop with 1990s techno, retro-style electropop and electronic dance music
- Electronicore, also known as synthcore or trancecore, a fusion genre of metalcore with elements of various electronic music genres, often including trance, electronica, and dubstep

== See also ==
- Hardcore (electronic dance music genre)
