= Feeling of Unity =

Studio album by Fear, and Loathing in Las Vegas
- Released: 30 September 2015
- Genre: Electronicore; post-hardcore; easycore; electropop; metalcore
- Length: 38:07
- Label: VAP

Fear, and Loathing in Las Vegas chronology
Phase 2 (2014)	Feeling of Unity (2015)	New Sunrise (2017)

Singles from Feeling of Unity
- 1. "Let Me Hear" Released: 7 January 2015; 2. "Starburst" Released: 13 May 2015

Feeling of Unity is the fourth studio album by Japanese electronicore band Fear, and Loathing in Las Vegas. It was released on 30 September 2015 through VAP. It is the last album to be released on this label.

== Background and promotion ==
On 5 September, the band announced on their official site that they will release a new limited single on 7 January 2015 called "Let Me Hear". On 8 October, the short version of their new single premiered as the opening theme of the anime series Parasyte.

On 13 May 2015, the band released a new limited singles "Starburst" and "Struggle to Survive". A few days after the release of "Starburst", the band announced on their official site that they would be releasing their fourth studio album this autumn including the two main songs from their last two singles, "Starburst" and "Let Me Hear". On 12 August, the band released a new PV for the song "Cast Your Shell" which also was included to the album. On 16 August, they announced the title of the album.

== Track listing ==
No.	Title	Length
1.	"Cast Your Shell"	3:07
2.	"Meaning of Existence"	3:21
3.	"Escape from the Loop"	3:48
4.	"Starburst"	3:30
5.	"Interlude"	1:42
6.	"Party Boys"	3:47
7.	"Gratitude"	3:57
8.	"Ignite Your Frail Mind"	3:15
9.	"The Demon Called Careless"	3:27
10.	"Let Me Hear"	3:44
11.	"Journey to Aim High"	4:40
Total length:		38:07

== Personnel ==
Fear, and Loathing in Las Vegas

- So – clean vocals, backing unclean vocals, programming
- Minami – unclean vocals, rapping, keyboards, programming
- Sxun – lead guitar, backing vocals
- Taiki – rhythm guitar, backing vocals
- Kei – bass
- Tomonori – drums, percussion

== Charts ==
=== Album ===
Chart (2015)	Peak position
Japanese Albums (Oricon)	2

=== Singles ===
Title	Year	Peak positions	
Title	Year	JPN Oricon	JPN Billboard
"Let Me Hear"	2015	3	7
"Starburst"	2015	6	—
