= Hypertoughness =

Studio album by Fear, and Loathing in Las Vegas
- Released: 4 December 2019
- Genre: Electronicore; post-hardcore; metalcore; electropop; easycore
- Length: 36:46
- Label: Warner Music Japan

Fear, and Loathing in Las Vegas chronology
New Sunrise (2017)	Hypertoughness (2019)	Cocoon for the Golden Future (2022)

Singles from Hypertoughness
- 1. "The Gong of Knockout" Released: 7 June 2019; 2. "The Stronger, the Further You'll Be" Released: 19 September 2019; 3. "Massive Core" Released: 29 November 2019

Hypertoughness (stylised in all caps) is the sixth studio album by Japanese electronicore band Fear, and Loathing in Las Vegas. It was released on 4 December 2019 through Warner Music Japan. It is the first album to feature new bassist Tetsuya, who replaced Kei due to the latter's death from acute heart failure at his home on the night of January 12th earlier that year.

== Background and promotion ==
On 31 January 2018, the band released a new PV for the song "Keep the Heat and Fire Yourself Up" which is also the opening for the anime Hakyū Hōshin Engi. The full single was released 2 May 2018. The band also provided "The Gong of Knockout" for the second opening for Netflix and TMS Entertainment's anime adaptation of Baki the Grappler in 2018. On 4 December, the band released the album in Japan with an announcement that the worldwide release date is set on 15 January 2020.

== Track listing ==
No.	Title	Length
1.	"The Stronger, the Further You'll Be"	3:41
2.	"The Gong of Knockout"	3:30
3.	"Cure"	3:09
4.	"Great Strange"	3:22
5.	"Interlude"	2:11
6.	"Keep the Heat and Fire Yourself Up"	3:25
7.	"Treasure in Your Hands"	3:29
8.	"Karma"	3:21
9.	"Thoughtless Words Have No Value But Just a Noise"	3:23
10.	"Where You Belong"	3:39
11.	"Massive Core"	3:32
Total length:		36:46

== Personnel ==
Fear, and Loathing in Las Vegas

- So – clean vocals, backing unclean vocals, programming
- Minami – unclean vocals, rapping, keyboards, programming
- Taiki – guitars, backing vocals
- Tetsuya – bass, backing vocals
- Tomonori – drums, percussion
- Sxun - lead guitars on track 6 & 7 (uncredited)
- Kei - bass on track 6 & 7

== Charts ==
Chart (2019)	Peak position
Japanese Albums (Oricon)	10

== Certifications ==
Region	Certification	Certified units/sales
Japan	—	11,835
