= Devil Inside =

Devil Inside may refer to:

== Songs ==
- "Devil Inside" (INXS song), 1988
- "Devil Inside" (Utada song), 2004
- "Devil Inside", by Tim Skold from Skold, 1996
- "The Devil Inside", by Brandon Yates from Death Battle, 2025

== Other uses ==
- The Devil Inside (film), a 2012 American horror film
- "The Devil Inside" (Medium), a 2009 two-part TV episode
- "The Devil Inside" (The Vampire Diaries), a 2014 TV episode
- The Devil Inside (video game), a 2000 third-person shooter

== See also ==
- The Devil Inside Me, a 2011 Chinese horror film
- "The Devil Inside You", a 2010 song by Our Last Night from We Will All Evolve
