= All That We Have Now =

Studio album by Fear, and Loathing in Las Vegas
- Released: 8 August 2012
- Studio: Innig Studio; Prime Sound Studio Form; Parasight
- Genre: Post-hardcore; electronicore; metalcore; easycore
- Length: 36:44
- Label: VAP
- Producer: Yasutaka Hibi; Yasuhisa Kataoka

Fear, and Loathing in Las Vegas chronology
Nextreme (2011)	All That We Have Now (2012)	Rave-up Tonight (2014)

Singles from All That We Have Now
- 1. "Just Awake" Released: 11 January 2012

All That We Have Now is the second studio album by Japanese electronicore band Fear, and Loathing in Las Vegas. It was released on 8 August 2012 through VAP. This is the last release to feature founding member Mashu on bass. He left the band in 2013, and was later replaced by Kei. The album's title, All That We Have Now, says that they have become their culmination content so far. The album reached number 4 on Oricon chart, sold 23,525 copies in its first week release. The single of the album, "Just Awake", originally recorded in Japanese, was later released with an English version. It was used as the first ending theme of the Hunter × Hunter reboot anime.

== Track listing ==
No.	Title	Length
1.	"Acceleration"	3:08
2.	"Scream Hard as You Can"	3:57
3.	"Crossover"	3:12
4.	"How Old You Are? Never Forget Your Dream"	3:58
5.	"Interlude I"	2:01
6.	"Just Awake"	3:38
7.	"Defeat and Beat"	3:08
8.	"In the End, the Choice Is All Yours"	3:53
9.	"Ley-Line"	3:51
10.	"Interlude II"	2:11
11.	"Don't Suffer Alone"	3:43
Total length:		36:44

Bonus track
No.	Title	Length
12.	"Just Awake" (English version)	3:39
Total length:		40:23

== Personnel ==
Fear, and Loathing in Las Vegas

- So – clean vocals, backing unclean vocals, programming
- Minami – unclean vocals, rapping, keyboards, programming
- Sxun – lead guitar, backing vocals
- Taiki – rhythm guitar, backing vocals
- Mashu – bass
- Tomonori – drums, percussion

Additional personnel

- Yasutaka Hibi – production, mixing
- Yasuhisa Kataoka – production, mixing
- Tuckey – mastering
- Kentaro Tanaka – A&R
- Kai Kuzuyama – management
- Takashi Watanabe – package coordination
- Keisuke Nishina – sales promotion
- Takehiro Kobayashi – web promotion
- Yutty – art direction, design
- Yuji Ono – photography

== Charts ==
=== Album ===
Chart (2012)	Peak position
Japanese Albums (Oricon)	4

=== Single ===
Title	Year	Peak positions	
Title	Year	JPN Oricon	JPN Billboard
"Just Awake"	2012	8	24
