= Oak Island (EP) =

EP by Our Last Night
- Released: November 4, 2013
- Genre: Post-hardcore; alternative metal; metalcore
- Length: 26:29
- Label: Independent
- Producer: Matt Wentworth

Our Last Night chronology
A Summer of Covers (2013)	Oak Island (2013)	Oak Island Acoustic (2014)

Singles from Oak Island
- 1. "Same Old War" Released: October 22, 2013

Oak Island is the third EP by New Hampshire-based post-hardcore band Our Last Night. It was self-released on November 4, 2013, and was the band's first original release after leaving Epitaph Records.

== Background ==
Oak Island is Our Last Night's first original release after leaving Epitaph Records. The EP is named after a real island in Nova Scotia that is known for a legend about buried treasure and multiple discoveries of mysterious objects.

== Recording ==
The band recorded the album at Sonic Debris Recording and Impact Studios. The funds for this EP and their other EP A Summer of Covers were raised through a Indiegogo campaign where they had a goal of $15,000 and raised $46,551.

== Promotion ==
On October 22, 2013, a music video was released on Spotify and YouTube for the single "Same Old War". A lyric video for "I've Never Felt This Way" was released on YouTube on November 1, 2013. The EP was released on November 4, 2013. On January 7, 2014, a music video was released for "Sunrise" where the band partnered with the Bully Project to create a collaboration t-shirt with all the money earned from the t-shirt donated to the Bully Project. A tour was announced to start on February 3, 2014, with Secrets and Empires Fade. The band released a music video for "Dark Storms" on April 29, 2014. An acoustic version of the EP was released June 25, 2014.

== Reception ==
Professional ratings
Review scores
Source	Rating
Sputnikmusic	4/5

Sputnikmusic described the EP as "a rare example of how to make a simple and catchy album without sacrificing a moment of creativity" and that it was "a standout for the lighter side of the genre".

== Track listing ==
All tracks are written by Our Last Night.

No.	Title	Length
1.	"Dark Storms"	4:02
2.	"I've Never Felt This Way"	3:38
3.	"Same Old War"	4:05
4.	"Reality Without You"	3:41
5.	"Sunrise"	3:49
6.	"Scared of Change"	3:20
7.	"Oak Island"	3:54
Total length:		26:29

== Credits and personnel ==
Our Last Night

- Trevor Wentworth – lead vocals, additional guitar
- Matt Wentworth – clean vocals, guitar
- Alex "Woody" Woodrow – bass
- Tim Molloy – drums

Production

- Matt Wentworth – producer, mixing engineer
- Dan Korneff – mixing engineer
- Stetson Whitworth – additional producer, programmer
- Corwin Bermudez – album artist

== Charts ==
Weekly Charts
Chart (2013)	Peak position
US Billboard 200	182
US Heatseekers Albums (Billboard)	2
US Independent Albums (Billboard)	24
US Top Rock Albums (Billboard)	46
