= New Demons =

Studio album by I See Stars
- Released: October 22, 2013
- Genre: Metalcore; electronicore; post-hardcore
- Length: 50:26
- Label: Sumerian
- Producer: Joey Sturgis

I See Stars chronology
Digital Renegade (2012)	New Demons (2013)	Phases (2015)

Singles from New Demons
- 1. "Violent Bounce (People Like ¥øµ)" Released: June 19, 2013; 2. "Murder Mitten" Released: September 23, 2013; 3. "New Demons" Released: October 7, 2013

Professional ratings
Review scores
Source	Rating
Absolute Punk	75%
Alternative Press	3.5/5 stars

New Demons is the fourth studio album by American electronicore band I See Stars, released on October 22, 2013 through Sumerian Records. The album was originally set for release on August 13, before being pushed back to September 17, and again to October 22 for unknown reasons. The album marks a progression of the sound in their previous album Digital Renegade, with Zach Johnson having a much bigger vocal role, as well as having a much more prominent EDM sound. The song "Violent Bounce" was the first single to be released. It was uploaded to YouTube via the Sumerian Records channel. "Murder Mitten" and the title track, "New Demons", were to follow. The band did performances of the song "Ten Thousand Feet" to give fans a taste of what is going to be on the rest of the album before its release. Klayton of Celldweller, Mutrix, and Razihel all provided additional programming for some of the tracks.

It is the final album to feature unclean vocalist/keyboardist Zach Johnson and rhythm guitarist Jimmy Gregerson before they were dismissed from the band in June 2015.

== Background ==
The album had been worked on by the band immediately after their previous album, Digital Renegade, was finished. The song "Ten Thousand Feet" was the only song played from the album before it was released.

The song "Violent Bounce" was released as the first single from the album several months before the album release date, accompanied by a lyric video. The song "Murder Mitten" is written about brothers Devin and Andrew Oliver's relationship with their mother, who was an alcoholic during their childhood.

A remix version entitled New Demons (Remixes) was released on February 23, 2015. Featuring eight remixes from various producers, showcasing many styles of EDM.

== Reception ==
The album debuted on Billboard 200 at No. 28, No. 10 on the Top Rock Albums Albums chart, selling 10,000 copies in its first week. It has sold 47,000 copies in the United States as of June 2016.

== Track listing ==
All lyrics are written by Andrew and Devin Oliver; all music is composed by I See Stars.

No.	Title	Length
1.	"Initialization Sequence"	0:54
2.	"Ten Thousand Feet"	5:44
3.	"Follow Your Leader"	4:46
4.	"New Demons"	4:42
5.	"Violent Bounce (People Like ¥øµ)"	4:44
6.	"Murder Mitten"	5:03
7.	"We're Not in Kansas Anymore"	4:46
8.	"Judith Rules"	4:12
9.	"Boris the Animal"	4:03
10.	"Crystal Ball"	3:43
11.	"When I Say Jump, You Say How High"	3:17
12.	"Who Am I?"	4:28
Total length:		50:26

New Demons (Remixes)
No.	Title	Length
1.	"Violent Bounce" (Razihel Remix)	4:17
2.	"Initialization Sequence" (INF1N1TE Remix)	4:12
3.	"Ten Thousand Feet" (Maskarade Remix)	4:16
4.	"Murder Mitten" (Dotcom Remix)	3:13
5.	"Follow Your Leader" (Scout Remix)	3:15
6.	"Boris the Animal" (MindlessMindless Remix)	2:49
7.	"Judith Rules" (Secoya Remix)	5:43
8.	"When I Say Jump, You Say How High" (INF1N1TE Remix)	4:07
Total length:		31:12

== Personnel ==
I See Stars

- Devin Oliver – clean vocals
- Zach Johnson – unclean vocals, keyboards, synthesizers, sequencer, programming
- Brent Allen – lead guitar
- Jimmy Gregerson – rhythm guitar
- Jeff Valentine – bass guitar
- Andrew Oliver – drums, percussion, backing vocals; additional clean vocals on "Murder Mitten"

Production

- Jake Klein – additional writing for "Murder Mitten", "We're Not in Kansas Anymore" and "Who Am I?"
- Joey Valentine – additional writing for "Murder Mitten", "We're Not in Kansas Anymore" and "Who Am I?", additional production
- Joey Sturgis – production, engineering, mixing, mastering
- Shawn Keith – executive producer, art direction
- Nick Scott – guitars, bass and vocals engineering, guitar and bass editing
- Chuck Alkazian – drum engineering
- Josh Karpowicz – assistant drum engineering at Pearl Sound Studios, Canton, Michigan
- Jeff Dunne – drum editing
- Kacey Dodson – vocal editing
- Scott "Celldweller" Albert, Nicolò "Razihel" Arquilla and James "Mutrix" Ruehlmann – additional production
- Matt Dalton – additional production, additional gang vocals at 37 Studios, Michigan
- Dylan Kuhn – painting and wall photography at Noveltycross Productions
- Daniel McBride – album layout at McBride Design, art direction
- Unlimited Visual – band logo design
- Jonathan Weiner – band photography

== Charts ==
Chart (2013)	Peak position
US Billboard 200	28
US Top Alternative Albums (Billboard)	6
US Top Dance Albums (Billboard) (remix version)	10
US Top Hard Rock Albums (Billboard)	5
US Independent Albums (Billboard)	4
US Top Rock Albums (Billboard)	10
