= Age of Ignorance =

Studio album by Our Last Night
- Released: August 21, 2012
- Genre: Post-hardcore; metalcore; alternative metal
- Length: 36:13
- Label: Epitaph
- Producer: David Bendeth

Our Last Night chronology
We Will All Evolve (2010)	Age of Ignorance (2012)	A Summer Of Covers (2013)

Singles from Age of Ignorance
- 1. "Liberate Me" Released: June 26, 2012; 2. "Age of Ignorance" Released: July 24, 2012; 3. "Invincible" Released: August 7, 2012

Age of Ignorance is the fourth studio album by New Hampshire-based band Our Last Night. It was released on Epitaph Records on August 21, 2012. A deluxe edition of the album was released on iTunes on June 14, 2013, that included three additional songs: Fate (Acoustic), Reason to Love (Acoustic), and Skyfall.

== Track listing ==
All tracks are written by Matt Wentworth, except where noted.

No.	Title	Length
1.	"Fate"	3:33
2.	"Send Me to Hell"	3:51
3.	"Age of Ignorance" (Wentworth, David Bendeth)	3:55
4.	"Reason to Love" (Wentworth, Bendeth)	3:51
5.	"Liberate Me"	3:26
6.	"Voices"	3:49
7.	"Conspiracy"	3:37
8.	"Enemy"	3:09
9.	"Invincible"	3:29
10.	"A Sun That Never Sets"	3:34
Total length:		36:13

Professional ratings
Review scores
Source	Rating
AllMusic	3/5 stars
Alternative Press	2/5 stars
Diamond in the Rock	8/10 stars
Decoy Music	3/5 stars

== Personnel ==
Our Last Night

- Trevor Wentworth – lead vocals, additional guitar
- Matt Wentworth – clean vocals, guitar
- Alex "Woody" Woodrow – bass
- Tim Molloy – drums

Production

- David Bendeth – producer
