= Ninja vs. Gokudo =

Japanese manga series

- First tankōbon volume cover, featuring Kiwami Kimura (left) and Shinoha Tanaka (right)

忍者と極道 (Ninja to Gokudō)
- Genre: Action; Comedy
- Manga
- Written by: Shinsuke Kondō
- Published by: Kodansha
- English publisher: NA: Kodansha USA
- Imprint: Morning KC
- Magazine: Comic Days
- Original run: January 20, 2020 – present
- Volumes: 17
- Anime television series
- Directed by: Toshinori Watabe
- Written by: Keiichirō Ōchi
- Music by: Keita Takahashi; Harikemu Wata
- Studio: Studio Deen
- Licensed by: Amazon Prime Video
- Original network: Nippon TV, BS NTV
- Original run: October 8, 2025 – December 24, 2025
- Episodes: 12

Ninja vs. Gokudo (忍者と極道, Ninja to Gokudō) is a Japanese manga series written and illustrated by Shinsuke Kondō. It began serialization on Kodansha's Comic Days website in January 2020. An anime television series adaptation produced by Studio Deen aired from October to December 2025.

== Plot ==
An ancient war between ninja and yakuza has raged for over three centuries, resurfacing across eras as societies rise and fall. In the modern age, Shinoha Tanaka, a young ninja traumatized by his past and is unable to laugh, encounters Kiwami Kimura, a seemingly ordinary office worker who secretly leads a powerful yakuza faction. Unaware of each other's true identities, the two form an unlikely bond through shared interests, creating a fragile sense of normalcy amid hidden danger. Their friendship unfolds as tensions between ninja clans and yakuza organizations escalate once more, reigniting the long-standing blood feud.

== Characters ==
Shinoha Tanaka (多仲 忍者, Tanaka Shinoha)
Voiced by: Chiaki Kobayashi (Japanese); Conradie van Heerden (English)
Kiwami Kimura (輝村 極道, Kimura Kiwami)
Voiced by: Katsuyuki Konishi (Japanese); Nate Prentice (English)
Zanzo Kazai (神賽 惨蔵, Kazai Zanzō)
Voiced by: Toshiyuki Morikawa (Dandy), Kensho Ono (Pretty Boy), Mariko Higashiuchi (Blonde Beauty), Yūki Sanpei (Beast), Serina Machiyama (Boy), Volcano Ōta (King), Hisako Kanemoto (Beauty) (Japanese); Gavin Gomes, Chris van Rensburg^{Ep. 5 credits} (King), Bontle Mafojane^{Ep. 7 credits} (Blonde Beauty) (English)
Kaiza Akiba (璃刃 壊左, Akiba Kaiza)
Voiced by: Hōchū Ōtsuka (Japanese); Gordon van der Spuy (English)
Kosei Yuzawa (夢澤 恒星, Yuzawa Kōsei)
Voiced by: Yasuhiro Mamiya (Japanese); Rob Coutts (English)
Nodoka Matsumoto (祭下 陽日, Matsumoto Nodoka)
Voiced by: Yuma Uchida (Japanese); Luke Bollman^{Ep. 2 credits} (English)
Shiki Yamada (病田 色, Yamada Shiki)
Voiced by: Kana Hanazawa (Japanese); Bontle Mafojane^{Ep. 2 credits} (English)
Gamute (ガムテ)
Voiced by: Sumire Uesaka (Japanese); Schae Pietersen^{Ep. 3 credits} (English)
Hiroki Yajima (殺島 飛露鬼, Yajima Hiroki)
Voiced by: Takehito Koyasu (Japanese); Kine Matose^{Ep. 3 credits} (English)
Sako Hasegawa (覇世川 左虎, Hasegawa Sako)
Voiced by: Makoto Furukawa (Japanese); Thomas Collins^{Ep. 4 credits} (English)
Uryu Yagi (邪樹 右龍, Yagi Uryū)
Voiced by: Hiroki Yasumoto (Japanese); Rob Coutts^{Ep. 4 credits} (English)
Daijin (大臣)
Voiced by: Nobunaga Shimazaki (Japanese); Conradie van Heerden^{Ep. 6 credits} (English)
Tome Odaka (雄鷹 斗女, Odaka Tome)
Voiced by: Yuka Iguchi
Anatomi Kurita (繰田 孔富, Kurita Anatomi)
Voiced by: Tomokazu Sugita (Japanese); Chris van Rensburg^{Ep. 12 credits} (English)
Hanako Saito (砕涛 華虎, Saitō Hanako)
Voiced by: Taiten Kusunoki
Maya Kohara (蟲原 真夜, Kohara Maya)
Voiced by: Mamiko Noto

== Media ==
=== Manga ===
Written and illustrated by Shinsuke Kondō, Ninja vs. Gokudo began serialization on Kodansha's Comic Days website on January 20, 2020. Its chapters have been collected in seventeen tankōbon volumes as of April 2026.

During their Anime Expo 2023 panel, Kodansha USA announced that they licensed the series, with the first volume releasing in Q2 2024.

No.	Original release date	Original ISBN	English release date	English ISBN
1	April 8, 2020	978-4-06-519365-5	June 11, 2024	979-8-88-877164-8
1. "Ninja Vs. Gokudo"; 2. "Source of the Signal Flare"; 3. "Two Loves"; 4. "To War, Oblivious"; 5. "Gentle Men" (Part 1); 6. "Gentle Men" (Part 2); 7. "From Smolder to Flame"
2	July 8, 2020	978-4-06-520098-8	July 16, 2024	979-8-88-877165-5
8. "To War, Cat and Mouse"; 9. "Oh, Misery"; 10. "Second Friend"; 11. "He Who Burns the Hottest Wins"; 12. "Ring the Bells of Joy, Cue My Melancholy"; 13. "You Die!"; 14. "Lips"; 15. "Song of Solitude"; 16. "Death Storm Alert"; 17. "Highway Blues"
3	October 14, 2020	978-4-06-520852-6	October 15, 2024	979-8-88-877166-2
18. "Ready, Steady Go"; 19. "God Jazz Time"; 20. "A World Exposed"; 21. "She Died"; 22. "Burning Motors Go Lost to Heaven"; 23. "SOSOS"; 24. "Keep the Heat and Fire Yourself Up"; 25. "Razor's Song"; 26. "Electric Circus"; 27. "Waves of Gasoline"
4	January 13, 2021	978-4-06-521835-8	November 26, 2024	979-8-88-877167-9
28. "Outsider"; 29. "Black Love Hole"; 30. "Revolving Junkies"; 31. "1,000 Tambourines"; 32. "Happy People"; 33. "The End of the World"; 34. "Hit Man"; 35. "Monkey Love Sick"; 36. "Tears Will Fall"; 37. "Linda Linda"
5	February 10, 2021	978-4-06-522201-0	January 21, 2025	979-8-88-877168-6
38. "Stage of the Ground"; 39. "Laugh Maker"; 40. "Anti-Hero"; 41. "Rainbow-Coded War"; 42. "Glass Brace"; 43. "GO"; 44. "Re:set"; 45. "PLAY"; Bonus: "Morning Edition: Down to Business"
6	July 14, 2021	978-4-06-523455-6	March 18, 2025	979-8-88-877169-3
46. "Parade"; 47. "Zero"; 48. "Never Ending World"; 49. "Gungnir"; 50. "Stargazing"; 51. "Death Disco"; 52. "Battle Cry"; 53. "Fleabane"; 54. "RPG"
7	October 13, 2021	978-4-06-524976-5	May 13, 2025	979-8-88-877170-9
55. "FANTASISTA"; 56. "Tristar Quartet"; 57. "Acacia"; 58. "Dandelion"; 59. "Lost Man"; 60. "K"; 61. "Mayday"; 62. "Critical Hit"; 63. "Flame Warrior"
8	January 12, 2022	978-4-06-526450-8	July 15, 2025	979-8-88-877171-6
64. "Songs of Friends"; 65. "DON QUIXOTE"; 66. "Diamond"; 67. "Cooking Up Magic"; 68. "World Peace"; 69. "Revelry"; 70. "SOS"; 71. "Early-Summer Rain"; 72. "Moonbow"
9	April 13, 2022	978-4-06-527483-5	September 16, 2025	979-8-88-877172-3
73. "Only Lonely Glory"; 74. "Earth Child"; 75. "If I Sing to the Sky"; 76. "Au Revoir"; 77. "Hello, World!"; 78. "Nightmare on Galaxy Street"; 79. "Karma"; 80. "The Stronger, The Further You'll Be"; 81. "If Only We Could Go Through the Same Door"
10	September 14, 2022	978-4-06-529056-9	November 18, 2025	979-8-88-877173-0
82. "Ray"; 83. "REVOLUTION"; 84. "ILLUMINATI"; 85. "Blood and Roses of Reunion"; 86. "CALLING"; 87. "DICE"; 88. "Erosion"; 89. "Remains -ZAN-"; Bonus: "Sado vs. Gokudo"
11	January 11, 2023	978-4-06-530297-2	January 13, 2026	979-8-88-877174-7
90. "MERMAID"; 91. "ROCKET DIVE"; 92. "SANDY"; 93. "Her 'Modern' " 94. "Bel-Air -Within the Time of a Void-"; 95. "Sky of Oblivion"; 96. "Swaying"; 97. "Driver's High"; 98. "X"
12	October 11, 2023	978-4-06-533107-1	March 17, 2026	979-8-88-877316-1
99. "Survival"; 100. "ROSIER"; 101. "Biribiri Crashmen"; 102. "A Thousand Knives Pierce the Chest"; 103. "STORM"; 104. "Like @ Angel"; 105. "RED ZONE"; 106. "Moonlight Flower"
13	June 12, 2024	978-4-06-535861-0	May 19, 2026	979-8-88-877454-0
107. "Devil Side"; 108. "Fish Scratch Fever"; 109. "Heaven's Drive"; 110. "Silent Jealousy"; 111. "Beast of Blood"; 112. "Bloodstained Fruit"; 113. "Crimson"; 114. "Art of Life"; 115. "Winter, Again"
14	November 13, 2024	978-4-06-537366-8	—	—
15	May 14, 2025	978-4-06-539489-2	—	—
16	October 8, 2025	978-4-06-540991-6	—	—
17	April 8, 2026	978-4-06-542662-3	—	—

=== Anime ===
An anime television series adaptation was announced on February 24, 2025. It was produced by Studio Deen and directed by Toshinori Watanabe, with Keiichirō Ōchi handling series composition, Toshiyuki Matsutake designing the characters, and Keita Takahashi and Harikemu Wata composing the music. The series aired from October 8 to December 24, 2025, on Nippon TV's AnichU programming block, as well as BS NTV. (Note: Nippon TV listed the series premiere on October 7 at 25:59, which is effectively October 8 at 1:59 a.m. JST.) The opening theme song is "Sweet Disaster", performed by Miyavi, while the ending theme song is "Until You Die Out", performed by Fear, and Loathing in Las Vegas. Amazon Prime Video is streaming the series worldwide.

==== Episodes ====
No.	Title	Directed by	Written by	Storyboarded by	Original release date
1	"Shinoha and Kiwami"; Transliteration: "Shinoha to Kiwami" (Japanese: 忍者(しのは)と極道(きわみ))	Toshinori Watanabe	Keiichirō Ōchi	Toshinori Watanabe	October 8, 2025
2	"Part 1 The Blood-Scented Flare of Akasaka"; Transliteration: "Daiisshō Akasaka Keppū Rōen" (Japanese: 第一章 赤坂血風狼烟)	Takashi Andō	Keiichirō Ōchi	Toshinori Watanabe	October 15, 2025
3	"Part 2 Blazing Chivalry and Justice in Kabuchika"; Transliteration: "Dainishō Moeru Jingi no Kabuchika" (Japanese: 第二章 燃える仁義のカブチカ)	Toshinori Watanabe	Kazuhiko Inukai	Toshinori Watanabe	October 22, 2025
4	"Part 3 The Great Burial of Love #1"; Transliteration: "Daisanshō Jōai Dai Bōsō 1st" (Japanese: 第三章 情愛大暴葬 1st)	Taiei Andō	Keiichirō Ōchi	Taiei Andō	October 29, 2025
5	"Part 3 The Great Burial of Love #2"; Transliteration: "Daisanshō Jōai Dai Bōsō 2nd" (Japanese: 第三章 情愛大暴葬 2nd)	Toshinori Watanabe	Kazuhiko Inukai	Shinji Ishihira	November 5, 2025
6	"Part 3 The Great Burial of Love #3"; Transliteration: "Daisanshō Jōai Dai Bōsō 3rd" (Japanese: 第三章 情愛大暴葬 3rd)	Toshinori Watanabe	Keiichirō Ōchi	Toshinori Watanabe	November 12, 2025
7	"Part 4 Young Maniacs' Death Game, Stage 1"; Transliteration: "Daiyonshō Yokyō Bōrei Yūgi Sutēji 1" (Japanese: 第四章 幼狂死亡遊戯 STAGE1)	Hiromasa Irie	Kazuhiko Inukai	Hiromasa Irie	November 19, 2025
8	"Part 4 Young Maniacs' Death Game, Stage 2"; Transliteration: "Daiyonshō Yokyō Bōrei Yūgi Sutēji 2" (Japanese: 第四章 幼狂死亡遊戯 STAGE2)	Yū Yabūchi	Keiichirō Ōchi	Shōko Hayashi	November 26, 2025
9	"Part 4 Young Maniacs' Death Game, Stage 3"; Transliteration: "Daiyonshō Yokyō Bōrei Yūgi Sutēji 3" (Japanese: 第四章 幼狂死亡遊戯 STAGE3)	Kōsuke Shimotori	Kazuhiko Inukai	Shinji Ishihira	December 3, 2025
10	"Part 4 Young Maniacs' Death Game, Stage 4"; Transliteration: "Daiyonshō Yokyō Bōrei Yūgi Sutēji 4" (Japanese: 第四章 幼狂死亡遊戯 STAGE4)	Taiei Andō	Kazuhiko Inukai	Taiei Andō	December 10, 2025
11	"Part 4 Young Maniacs' Death Game, Stage 5"; Transliteration: "Daiyonshō Yokyō Bōrei Yūgi Sutēji 5" (Japanese: 第四章 幼狂死亡遊戯 STAGE5)	Toshinori Watanabe	Keiichirō Ōchi	Toshinori Watanabe	December 17, 2025
12	"Ninja vs. Gokudo"; Transliteration: "Ninja to Gokudō" (Japanese: 忍者(にんじゃ)と極道(ごくどう))	Toshinori Watanabe	Keiichirō Ōchi	Toshinori Watanabe	December 24, 2025

== Reception ==
The series was ranked 9th at the 2020 Web Manga General Election poll. It was also ranked 8th in Takarajimasha's Kono Manga ga Sugoi! guidebook list for best manga for male readers in 2021. The series was ranked 13th in the Nationwide Bookstore Employees' Recommended Comics of 2021. It was also nominated for the 7th Next Manga Awards in the digital category and ranked 10th out of 50 nominees. The series was ranked 10th in AnimeJapan's 6th "Most Wanted Anime Adaptation" poll in 2023.
