= Treehouse (I See Stars album) =

Studio album by I See Stars
- Released: June 17, 2016
- Genres: Electronicore; metalcore; screamo; post-hardcore; emo
- Length: 50:32
- Label: Sumerian
- Producers: Erik Ron; Nick Scott; Taylor Larson; David Bendeth

I See Stars chronology
Phases (2015)	Treehouse (2016)	The Wheel (2025)

Singles from Treehouse
- 1. "Mobbin' Out" Released: February 19, 2016; 2. "Running with Scissors" Released: May 12, 2016; 3. "Break" Released: May 31, 2016

Treehouse is the fifth studio album by American electronicore band I See Stars released on June 17, 2016, through Sumerian Records. It is their first studio album not to feature vocalist and keyboardist Zach Johnson and guitarist Jimmy Gregerson, who were both asked to leave the band in 2015. The album was produced by Erik Ron, Nick Scott, Taylor Larson, and David Bendeth.

== Track listing ==
Song titles adapted from the album's iTunes Store listing.

All lyrics are written by Andrew and Devin Oliver; all music is composed by I See Stars.

No.	Title	Length
1.	"Calm Snow"	3:11
2.	"Break"	3:47
3.	"White Lies"	3:32
4.	"Everyone's Safe in the Treehouse"	4:06
5.	"Running with Scissors"	4:22
6.	"Mobbin' Out"	4:55
7.	"Walking on Gravestones"	3:50
8.	"Light in the Cave"	3:51
9.	"All In"	4:22
10.	"Two Hearted"	4:24
11.	"Portals"	5:23
12.	"Yellow King"	4:49
Total length:		50:32

== Personnel ==
I See Stars

- Devin Oliver – lead vocals
- Andrew Oliver – keyboards, synthesizers, sequencer, programming, backing vocals; co-lead vocals on "Light in the Cave".
- Brent Allen – guitars
- Jeff Valentine – bass guitar

Additional musicians

- Luke Holland – drums, percussion
- Nick Scott - production, guitar, programming (tracks 1–3, 5–12), mixing and mastering (track 9)
- Erik Ron - production (tracks 1–3, 5–8, 10–12), mixing and mastering (track 6)
- David Bendeth - mixing and mastering (track 4)
- Taylor Larson - mixing and mastering (tracks 1–3, 5, 7–8, 10–12)
- Jayda Taylor - songwriting, production
- Joey Valentine - songwriting

== Charts ==
Chart (2016)	Peak position
Australian Albums (ARIA)	78
New Zealand Heatseekers Albums (RMNZ)	9
US Billboard 200	93
