= The End of the World Party =

Studio album by I See Stars
- Released: February 22, 2011
- Recorded: Chango Studios, Orlando, Florida
- Genres: Electronicore; screamo; post-hardcore; pop-punk
- Length: 37:34
- Label: Sumerian
- Producer: Cameron Mizell

I See Stars chronology
3-D (2009)	The End of the World Party (2011)	Digital Renegade (2012)

Singles from The End of the World Party
- 1. "The End of the World Party" Released: December 7, 2010; 2. "Wonderland" Released: February 1, 2011

Professional ratings
Review scores
Source	Rating
AllMusic	4.5/5 stars
Under the Gun Review	7/10

The End of the World Party is the second studio album by American electronicore band I See Stars. It was released on February 22, 2011 through Sumerian Records. The album is notable for featuring more pop-punk and pop influences than their debut album, 3-D.

== Background ==
The album was first announced to be in the works on October 8, 2010, through a statement posted by AbsolutePunk. The album was not mentioned again until the release of a video update on Sumerian Records' YouTube page, released on November 6, 2010.

The title track of the album, "The End of the World Party", was released on December 6, 2010, and the song could be unlocked by "liking" the Sumerian Records Facebook page. The track list was announced on January 14, 2011.

The album's release date of February 22, 2011 was announced through I See Stars' Merch Connection Inc. page, where they released pre-order packages on January 15, 2011. On February 1, 2011, Alternative Press started streaming the song "Wonderland" on their website.

== Track listing ==
All lyrics written by Andrew and Devin Oliver, all music composed by I See Stars.

No.	Title	Length
1.	"The End of the World Party"	3:16
2.	"Over It"	3:51
3.	"Still Not Quite Enough"	3:35
4.	"Wonderland"	2:29
5.	"Home for the Weekend"	3:19
6.	"It Will Be Up (High School Never Ends)"	3:33
7.	"Upside Down"	3:51
8.	"The Common Hours II"	2:55
9.	"Where I Let You Down (Numb)"	3:00
10.	"Glow"	2:56
11.	"Pop Rock & Roll"	4:49
Total length:		37:34

=== References to other media ===
- "The Common Hours II" main beat is taken from the song "Not Today Bish", a previous demo song from I See Stars. "The Common Hours II" also contains a verse from the song "Green Light Go!", the title track from I See Stars' debut EP of the same name.

== Chart positions ==
Chart (2011)	Peak position
Billboard 200	144
Top Rock Albums	37
Top Heatseekers	1
Top Independent Albums	18
Top Alternative Albums	23

== Personnel ==
Credits for The End of the World Party adapted from Allmusic.

I See Stars

- Devin Oliver – clean vocals
- Zach Johnson – unclean vocals, keyboards, synthesizers, sequencer, programming
- Brent Allen – lead guitar
- Jimmy Gregerson – rhythm guitar
- Jeff Valentine – bass guitar
- Andrew Oliver – drums, percussion, backing vocals

Production

- Cameron Mizell – production, engineering
- Matt Dalton – additional recording
- Joey Sturgis – mastering at The Foundation Recording Studios, Connersville, IN

Management and artwork

- Adam Mott and Mark Weiss (Plant Management, LLC) and Bret Disend and Brent Mulligan (Ozone Entertainment) – management
- Mike Marquis (Precision Agency) – North America, Japan and Australia booking
- Mark Ngui (Creative Artists Agency) – UK and Mainland Europe booking
- Scott Padell (Padell Business Management) – business management
- Mike McKoy (Serling, Rooks & Ferrara) – legal representation
- Unlimited Design and Daniel McBride – artwork and layout
- Shawn Keith – A&R
