= I See Stars =

American electronicore band

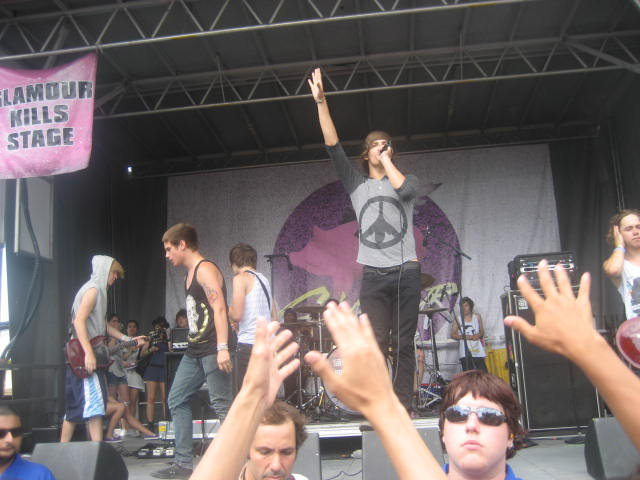
- I See Stars performing at the Vans Warped Tour in 2010. From left to right: Jimmy Gregerson (former), Jeff Valentine, Andrew Oliver (behind), Brent Allen.

Background information
- Origin: Warren, Michigan, U.S.
- Genres: Electronicore; post-hardcore; pop-punk; emo; metalcore
- Years active: 2006–present
- Label: Sumerian
- Members: Brent Allen; Andrew Oliver; Devin Oliver; Jeff Valentine
- Past members: Jimmy Gregerson; Zach Johnson; Chris Moore
- Website: iseestarsmusic.com

I See Stars is an American electronicore band from Warren, Michigan, formed in 2006. It consists of lead vocalist Devin Oliver, guitarist Brent Allen, keyboardist and co-vocalist Andrew Oliver, and bass guitarist Jeff Valentine. The band has released all six of their studio albums, and other releases, through Sumerian Records.

Their first album, 3-D (2009), peaked at No. 176 on the Billboard 200. Their second album, The End of the World Party, was released in 2011. The band's third studio album, Digital Renegade, was released in 2012 and demonstrated a stylistic change, featuring a more aggressive musical style than their prior albums. The band also appeared on the song "Beauty and the Beast" by Dubstep producer BARE. The band's fourth studio album, New Demons, was released in 2013. It featured elements of EDM while achieving an even further aggressive style than Digital Renegade. In 2015, the band released a remix album, titled Phases. The band's lineup remained unchanged (excluding the brief departure of` keyboardist and vocalist Zach Johnson in 2009, who returned the following year) from their formation in 2006 up until mid-2015, when the group announced the departure of Johnson and rhythm guitarist Jimmy Gregerson. Their fifth studio album and the first album featuring the new lineup, Treehouse, was released in 2016. They released an EP, Treehouse (Acoustic), in 2018.

After nearly a seven-year hiatus, I See Stars teased their return by posting a polaroid picture on their Instagram account featuring a lyric to their song "Drift", which later dropped in the single "Split" in August 2024. In September 2025, they released their sixth studio album titled The Wheel.

== History ==
=== Formation and early releases (2006–08) ===
Brothers Devin and Andrew Oliver played music together since they were young children and lived in the same neighborhood as guitarist Brent Allen, Devin stated: "me, Brent, the drummer's my brother, and the bass player, Jeff, we all lived on the block from each other since we were kids, [in] elementary school." The group officially started in 2006 under the name I See Stars—which also according to Devin there isn't any meaning behind the name other than the fact that they "needed a title" and someone brought it to the table.

The group released its debut EP Green Light Go! in 2007 and several raw demo tracks onto their MySpace profile, including a self-titled EP, before signing with Sumerian Records in 2008.

=== 3-D, Johnson's departure and Moore's arrival (2008–09) ===
I See Stars recorded their debut album, 3-D, in 2008 at Chango Gridlock Studios in Orlando, Florida, with producer Cameron Mizell. The album featured Zach Johnson as the screamer and keyboardist. Johnson left the band soon after the album's release on April 14, 2009, due to personal problems he felt interfered with him while on tour. Chris Moore, formerly of We Came as Romans and a merchandise salesman for the group, joined as the new screamer and keyboardist.

In August 2009, I See Stars embarked on the second annual "Artery Foundation Across the Nation" tour, headlined by Emarosa with supporters Our Last Night, In Fear and Faith, Burden of a Day and Broadway. In 2010, I See Stars finished touring with Attack Attack!, Breathe Carolina, Asking Alexandria and Bury Tomorrow for the third annual Artery Foundation Across the Nation tour.

=== Moore's departure, Johnson's return and The End of the World Party (2010) ===
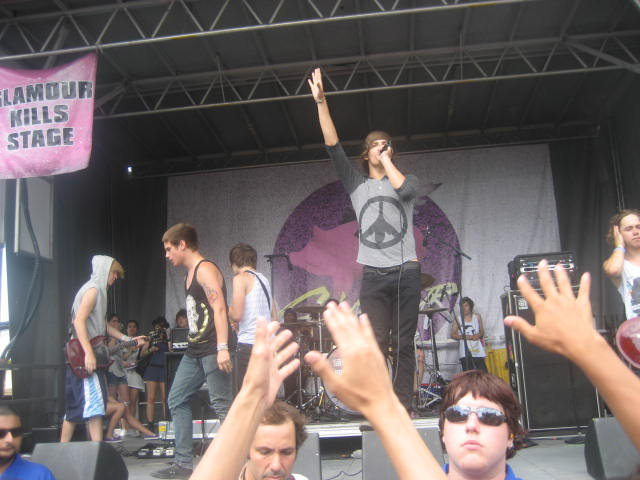
I See Stars at the 2010 Warped Tour

On June 14, 2010, Chris Moore announced his departure from the band, citing "artistic differences". After being asked to re-join, Zach Johnson returned to the band and joined them on Warped Tour 2010.

The group entered the studio in March 2010 to begin writing and recording their sophomore studio album called The End of the World Party with Sumerian Records and 3-D producer Cameron Mizell. Almost immediately after finishing the album, the band played Vans Warped Tour from June 24 to July 18, 2010.

The band released a preview of their second album's title track, "The End of the World Party", on November 4, 2010, to Sumerian Records' YouTube page. They played the song at various live shows in 2010 before the album's release. The full version of the title track was released to iTunes on December 7, 2010.

The band revealed the album's track listing on January 2, 2011. Before the album's release, the band played another song entitled "Glow" at various live concerts. On February 1, 2011, Alternative Press started streaming a new song from the album entitled "Wonderland". The full album was released on February 22, 2011.

The band has played in the Soundwave 2011 tour in Australia. They supported We the Kings alongside Versa in the United Kingdom. They also participated in the 2011 American AP Tour along with Conditions, Versa, Destroy Rebuild Until God Shows and Black Veil Brides.

On May 31, 2011, the band made their national television debut, while performing the songs "Glow" and "What This Means to Me" on Jimmy Kimmel Live!

=== Digital Renegade (2011–12) ===
I See Stars toured on the Monster Outbreak Tour with headliner Of Mice & Men and supporting bands Iwrestledabearonce, For the Fallen Dreams, Abandon All Ships, and That's Outrageous! from October 26 to November 29. The band toured on the Scream It Like You Mean It tour with Breathe Carolina and Chiodos as headliners. The tour also featured the rapper Mod Sun, The Color Morale, and the new metalcore band from Rise Records, The Air I Breathe. In interviews the band stated that they began recording a new album in September 2011, as soon as the Scream It Like You Mean It Tour finished. After a few recording sessions they began another tour in November. The album was produced by Joey Sturgis.

I See Stars headlined the Leave It 2 The Suits Tour with support from Stick to Your Guns, Memphis May Fire, Our Last Night, and Make Me Famous. In a commercial video for the tour, it was announced that their third album would be released on March 13, 2012, with the album title confirmed to be Digital Renegade. At midnight on January 8, 2012, an unmastered version of the song "Filth Friends Unite" from the then-upcoming album was released via the band's Facebook page. A finalized version of the song was released as the first official single from the album on January 17. I See Stars second single, "NZT48", was released on YouTube on February 23 as a lyric video. The song was released on iTunes February 28, also with the album put on pre-order. The full album was released on March 14, 2012.

On August 30, 2012, all members of the band were arrested in Saline County, Kansas, for possessing and intending to use "hallucinogenic drugs", though it was not specified which drugs. The members themselves released their mug shots, and lead vocalist Devin Oliver commented on the experience being arrested on his Twitter profile, stating that he "just had the worst 13 hours of [his] life".

After the band's release from jail, a new single titled "The Hardest Mistakes" was released on October 9, 2012, featuring Cassadee Pope. It is a remix of the song "Electric Forest". They also played on Falling in Reverse's "The Thug in Me Is You" tour for a few dates, but they were kicked off the tour early due to their feud with Falling in Reverse vocalist Ronnie Radke. They have stated that they are going to be touring again soon, regardless of the feud between the Falling in Reverse and I See Stars camps. I See Stars then hit the road with Asking Alexandria on the Monster Outbreak tour along with As I Lay Dying, Memphis May Fire and Attila, replacing Suicide Silence when they dropped off following lead singer Mitch Lucker's death.

=== Renegades Forever and New Demons (2013–15) ===
In early to mid 2013, the band finished their fourth studio album, New Demons, which was released on October 22. Joey Sturgis was the producer for the album. Klayton of Celldweller programmed four tracks on the album. The band later announced that they recorded a "heavier" song featuring vocalist Frank Palmeri of Emmure and a cameo appearance by Mattie Montgomery of For Today. That song, "Can We Start Again", was released on YouTube on May 12, 2013.

On June 17, 2013, Alternative Press published an exclusive premiere on their website of the first single from New Demons entitled "Violent Bounce (People Like ¥øμ)".

During Warped Tour 2013, the band played "Ten Thousand Feet" as a preview to New Demons. On September 24, the band released the second single titled "Murder Mitten". On October 8, I See Stars released the title track "New Demons" as a free song to those who pre-ordered the album, which leaked on October 10.

On August 27, 2013, the band announced their North American headlining tour Started From The Bottom Now We Here with The Word Alive, Crown the Empire, and guests Dayshell, Get Scared, and Palisades, beginning in Albuquerque, New Mexico, at the Historic Sunshine Theater on October 29 and ending in St. Louis on November 24.

On December 13, 2013, the band announced that they will be direct supporting Attila's "The New King's Tour" with supporting acts Capture, Ice Nine Kills and Myka Relocate beginning on January 31, 2014.

The band headlined The All Stars Tour in Summer 2014. They also toured in December 2014 with Razihel.

On June 16, 2015, the band's Facebook page was hijacked and posts began appearing on it that promoted Islamist propaganda. The attack was seemingly orchestrated by a Tunisian terrorist organization.

=== Phases, departure of Gregerson, Johnson's second exit, and Treehouse (2015–18) ===
On July 31, 2015, the band announced their newest release, Phases, an album centered around re-imagining songs from previous releases with an acoustic, clean style. The band also included four cover songs on the track list. As well as announcing the all acoustic album, I See Stars announced they would be headlining an acoustic tour known as the "Phases Tour". After the release of the album Jimmy Gregerson left the band for reasons never stated and subsequently became a touring member of Metro Station. Although it was revealed on his Instagram account that he had actually been kicked out of the band during Warped Tour 2015, this information was not made public until at least a month after his departure and was later confirmed once again in December 2015, via Twitter. Zach Johnson did not appear on Phases, nor did he tour with the band in support of it.

On December 22, 2015, the band released a short teaser video for a forthcoming headline tour of the US, which also included a teaser of new material expected for release in 2016. On the same day, Gregerson and Johnson made separate posts on their Instagram accounts stating that they had been released from the band a few months ago, although neither of them officially explained what led to their departure. It was later stated that Devin Oliver would take over both clean and unclean vocals and that Andrew Oliver would become the band's keyboardist and take over more vocal duties.

It was officially announced on the band's Facebook page that their fifth album, entitled Treehouse, would be released on June 17. The band participated in the "10 Years In The Black" Tour with Asking Alexandria, Born of Osiris, After the Burial, Upon a Burning Body, and Bad Omens. They then headlined another tour entitled the "Treehouse" Tour.

On April 6, 2018, the band released a brand new EP which contained acoustic renditions of songs from Treehouse.

=== Return to touring and The Wheel (2019–present) ===
On February 1, 2019, the band announced that they would be a part of Kayzo's "Doghouse Takeover Presents: Unleashed" tour, an electronic and metal crossover tour with many fellow acts from the alternative metal scene and electronic scene. Along with the announcement the band revealed their excitement for the tour stating that they have always done a lot of interesting line-ups on their headliners in the past but are excited to be helping Kayzo with pushing boundaries in the music scene.

On July 26, the band announced a small acoustic tour to honor the 10th anniversary of their debut album, 3-D, releasing the following statement: "We were just kids when we wrote 3D. This record birthed the beautiful life we are blessed to live & the incredible experiences that have come with it. Can't wait to do some shows strictly dedicated to this album front to back acoustically! This is just round one. So if you don't see your city on here don't stress out. Much more coming!"

On August 2, the band announced that they would be appearing on Our Last Night's "Let Light Overcome the Darkness Tour" at the beginning of November. They appeared alongside fellow rock acts The Word Alive and Ashland. On November 19, while on the North American headlining tour Our Last Night released their cover of the Lewis Capaldi song "Someone You Loved" alongside Telle of The Word Alive, Asia of Ashland and Devin from I See Stars.

In February 2021, it was confirmed on the band's manager, Nick Walter's Instagram page that the band was recording at Magic Door Recording with mixing being done by David Bendeth and Luke Holland returning on the drums. Walter declared that after a month and a half of recording, the album was through the recording process and ready for mixing.

On May 16, 2023, the band released two new singles, "Anomaly" and "Drift". On September 8, the band released another new single "Are We Even?".

On August 1, 2024, the band released a new single "Split".

In a conversation with It's Not A Phase Podcast at Slam Dunk Festival, Devin Oliver confirmed a new album would be released in August 2025. That album, titled The Wheel, was released on September 12, 2025. A music video for the song "Carry On for You" was released on the same day.

In February 2026, the band was announced as part of the lineup for the Louder Than Life music festival in Louisville, scheduled to take place in September.

== Musical style ==
I See Stars has been labeled as electronicore, incorporating elements of post-hardcore, pop-punk, emo and metalcore with their eclectic electronica sound, becoming one of the first well-known electronicore bands. Writing for Red Bull, music journalist Eli Enis stated that the band was known for "brazenly stuffing their hulking metalcore songs with gooey pop hooks, neon synths, and ravey effects", comparing them to Asking Alexandria, Attack Attack! and Enter Shikari.

Alternative Press stated that I See Stars was among the first electronicore bands to receive credibility within the greater metalcore scene: "At one time, I See Stars brought balance to the force—or something like that. When metalcore fully embraced the electronic revolution, it had many adversaries. With their first and third LPs, I See Stars bridged the gap between electronic metalcore and genuine reputability among bands and fans alike."

== Band members ==
Current

- Brent Allen – guitar (2006–present)
- Andrew Oliver – keyboards, programming (2015–present); additional clean vocals (2011–present); drums, backing vocals (2006–2015)
- Devin Oliver – lead vocals (2006–present)
- Jeff Valentine – bass (2006–present)

Former

- Jimmy Gregerson – guitar (2006–2015)
- Zach Johnson – screamed vocals, keyboards, programming (2006–2009; 2010–2015)
- Chris Moore – screamed vocals, keyboards, programming (2009–2010)

Touring and session

- Nick Scott – rhythm guitar (2015)
- Chris Koo – piano, keyboards, backing vocals (2015)
- Jacob Halmich – cello (2015)
- Jake Burkey – drums (2015)
- Luke Holland - touring drummer, session drummer for Treehouse (2016) and The Wheel (2025)
- Dakota Sammons – drums (2016–present)

Timeline

== Discography ==
Studio albums

- 3-D (2009)
- The End of the World Party (2011)
- Digital Renegade (2012)
- New Demons (2013)
- Treehouse (2016)
- The Wheel (2025)
