= Nextreme =

EP by Fear, and Loathing in Las Vegas
- Released: 13 July 2011
- Studio: Innig Studio; Dutch Mama Studio; Parasight
- Genre: Post-hardcore; electronicore; metalcore
- Length: 25:07
- Label: VAP
- Producer: Yasuhisa Kataoka; Kimihiro Nakase

Fear, and Loathing in Las Vegas chronology
Dance & Scream (2010)	Nextreme (2011)	All That We Have Now (2012)

Nextreme (stylised in all caps) is the sixth EP by Japanese electronicore band Fear, and Loathing in Las Vegas. It was released on 13 July 2011 through VAP. The title Nextreme was formed from "next" and "extreme" (or "limit"), meaning that the band received the previous work and thrust their "next limit" into a mini album. The EP made its debut at number 8 on the Oricon chart with 12,126 copies in its first week sales. Nextreme won the CD Shop Awards for New Blood category in 2012. The song "Jump Around" was selected to appear in the video game Pro Evolution Soccer 2012 as the fourth track, and "Chase the Light!" was used as the opening theme for the second season of the anime Kaiji.

== Track listing ==
No.	Title	Length
1.	"Chase the Light!"	3:33
2.	"Jump Around"	3:23
3.	"The Answer for Unequal World"	3:51
4.	"Shake Your Body"	3:45
5.	"Believe Yourself"	3:38
6.	"Interlude"	2:27
7.	"Short But Seems Long, Time of Our Life"	4:27
Total length:		25:07

== Personnel ==
Fear, and Loathing in Las Vegas

- So – clean vocals, backing unclean vocals, programming
- Minami – unclean vocals, rapping, keyboards, programming
- Sxun – lead guitar, backing vocals
- Taiki – rhythm guitar
- Mashu – bass
- Tomonori – drums, percussion

Additional personnel

- Yasuhisa Kataoka – production, mixing
- Kimihiro Nakase – production, mixing
- Tuckey – mastering
- Kentaro Tanaka – A&R
- Kai Kuzuyama – management
- Takashi Watanabe – package coordination
- Keisuke Nishina – sales promotion
- Takehiro Kobayashi – web promotion
- Yutty – art direction, design
- Yuji Ono – photography

== Charts ==
Chart (2011)	Peak position
Japanese Albums (Billboard)	8
Japanese Albums (Oricon)	8

== Certifications ==
Region	Certification	Certified units/sales
Japan	—	16,137

== Awards ==
Year	Award	Category	Work/Nominee	Result
2012	CD Shop Awards	New Blood	Nextreme	Won
