= Dance & Scream =

2010 album by Fear, and Loathing in Las Vegas

Studio album by Fear, and Loathing in Las Vegas
- Released: November 24, 2010
- Genres: Electronicore; metalcore; post-hardcore; screamo
- Length: 40:50
- Label: VAP
- Producers: Tuckey; Yasuhisa Kataoka; Kimihiro Nakase

Fear, and Loathing in Las Vegas chronology
Dance & Scream (2010)	Nextreme (2011)

Singles from Dance & Scream
- 1. "Burn the Disco Floor with Your “2-Step”!" Released: June 16, 2010; 2. "Take Me Out!!/Twilight" Released: 2010

Dance & Scream is the first full-length album by Japanese electronicore band Fear, and Loathing in Las Vegas, released on November 24, 2010.

== Overview ==
This album was released by the major label VAP. It was released exclusively at the CD store chain Tower Records (VPCP-81685). Approximately half of the tracks are re-recordings from self-released albums, and the band apparently focused on increasing the sharpness of the phrases.

Regarding the album name "Dance & Scream", Tomonori said, "Our band name is a bit long, so all the members decided to keep the album name simple."

Regarding the album's outcome, Sxun commented, "I was worried until the very end, but when all the songs were together, I was really pleased with what I'd created." So commented, "I think we've created the best 11 songs we could, so I'm really satisfied." Tomonori added, "I'm glad we were able to do it without compromising!" Although streaming had not been available for a long time, streaming began in June 2021, and a live concert was also planned to commemorate this.

== Song production ==
Sxun and Minami generally created melodies and keyboard phrases, and then all six members expanded on them. Tomonori and Sxun offered their opinions, and the production progressed in this way.

Sxun said, "It feels like we've been working hard on each and every thing in front of us, like long-term goals, so I think our state of mind is a little different from how it appears to others. We went through a lot of tough times, and we worked hard in some areas, so looking back, I feel like it went well."

Sxun stated that they had a lot of trouble writing the songs, saying "It wasn't smooth at all, we all had a lot of discussions and a lot of problems came up, so we didn't compromise at all and we all talked the whole time and worked really hard. There were a lot of difficulties and conflicts, but even so, we were able to release this album with everything cleared up."

== Evaluation ==
On Tower Records Online, writer Hiroshi Arishima commented, "This is a must-listen album right now. It's a really cool album that doesn't make the slightest bit of a distinction between Japanese rock and Western rock." Ryuji Awano called it "one of the most shocking albums of 2010," adding, "Rather than scattering conflicting elements chaotically, the sense and technique of bringing them together with overwhelming speed and catchy melodies is nothing short of brilliant." Kaneko Atsutake explained, "It's a bizarre and high-energy mixture, true to the title, created by dramatic synths, fast-paced metallic guitar and double bass, catchy songs using auto-tune, and death vocals that still feel thin. I think the closest thing to it is Enter Shikari, but this one is far more chaotic."

Gekirock representative Shunsuke Muraoka also commented on the album, saying, "There's no doubt that it's based on electro + screamo = electremo, but it goes beyond that; the exceptionally catchy melodies have a mainstream, major feel to them, and it's a work that has the potential to attract a wide range of fans, from cutting-edge extreme metal fans to J-pop and J-rock fans."

== Track listing ==
CD
No.	Title	Length
1.	"Burn the Disco Floor with Your "2-step"!!"	3:10
2.	"Hey Girl!! Why Not Party Like a Bitch!?"	3:37
3.	"Stray in Chaos"	3:47
4.	"Love at First Sight"	4:12
5.	"Take Me Out!!"	4:09
6.	"interlude"	2:17
7.	"My Dear Lady, Will You Dance With Me Tonight?"	3:58
8.	"Because You Are Here"	3:52
9.	"Solitude X'mas"	4:11
10.	"Beyond the End"	3:39
11.	"Twilight"	3:48
Total length:		40:44

== Personnel ==
Fear, and Loathing in Las Vegas

- So – clean vocals, backing unclean vocals, programming
- Minami – unclean vocals, keyboards, programming
- Sxun – lead guitar
- Taiki – rhythm guitar
- Mashu – bass
- Tomonori – drums, percussion

== Charts ==
- 46th (Oricon)
- Appearances: 60 (Oricon)
