= Digital Renegade =

Studio album by I See Stars
- Released: March 13, 2012
- Recorded: October 18 – November 8, 2011
- Studio: The Foundation Recording Studios, Connersville, Indiana
- Genre: Electronicore; post-hardcore; Metalcore
- Length: 36:16
- Label: Sumerian
- Producer: Joey Sturgis

I See Stars chronology
The End of the World Party (2011)	Digital Renegade (2012)	New Demons (2013)

Singles from Digital Renegade
- 1. "Filth Friends Unite" Released: January 17, 2012; 2. "NZT48" Released: February 28, 2012

Digital Renegade (stylized as [digital_renegade]) is the third studio album by American electronicore band I See Stars. It was released on March 13, 2012 through Sumerian Records. It features guest vocals by Danny Worsnop from the English rock band Asking Alexandria and Cassadee Pope from the American rock band Hey Monday.

As opposed to the band's first two records, Digital Renegade features a heavier metalcore sound with stronger use of electronics and synthesizers. Additionally, Devin Oliver's clean vocals appear less frequently on the album; only two songs feature him singing predominantly lead, "Digital Renegade" and "Electric Forest". The album received generally positive reviews from music critics, who commended its heavier sound compared to the band's previous material. It reached number 45 on the Billboard 200 in the United States, as well as the top 20 on the Rock Albums Chart and the top 10 on the Alternative Albums Chart, making it their most commercially successful album to date.

== Background ==
I See Stars began recording their third album in October 2011, as soon as the Scream It Like You Mean It Tour finished. After a few recording sessions they began another tour in November. In a commercial video for the Leave It to the Suits Tour, the band announced the album's release date would be March 13, 2012. The commercial trailer included clips from two new songs.

The band played new songs from the upcoming album on the Leave It 2 The Suits Tour, including the song "Gnars Attacks" and the single "Filth Friends Unite". An un-mastered version of "Filth Friends Unite" was released on January 8, 2012, at midnight on the band's Facebook page and the album title, Digital Renegade, was announced a few hours later. A finalized version of "Filth Friends Unite" was released as the first official single from the album on January 17. On February 10, 2012 the album was made available for pre-order and the cover art was revealed. The album's second single, "NZT48", was released on YouTube on February 23 as a lyric video. The song was released on iTunes February 28. On March 6, 2012, Alternative Press premiered the song "Mystery Wall" exclusively on their website.

When asked about Digital Renegade's musical style, the band's lead vocalist, Devin Oliver, made the following statement:

It's going to be heavier, but still with that pop rock element. It's going to be more electronic driven. I love everything about electronic music. I think that as we progress, the amount of electronica in our music is going to increase.

== Critical reception ==
Professional ratings
Review scores
Source	Rating
Allmusic	3.5/5 stars
Alternative Press	4/5 stars
Sputnikmusic	2.5/5 stars

Digital Renegade received generally positive reviews from music critics. Gregory Heaney from Allmusic gave the album a positive review, saying "While the group's fans might find this transition a bit jarring at first, the changes heard on Digital Renegade make it the most mature album to date from a band that's definitely evolving in a promising direction." Heaney indicated "Digital Renegade", "Underneath Every Smile" and "iBelieve" as the AMG track picks. Annie Zaleski from Alternative Press also gave the album a positive review, saying, "Unlike other bands who combine disparate styles, I See Stars do so in unexpected ways; the mash-up of programmed effects and crushing rock elements sounds seamless and exciting. Yet Digital Renegade also won’t alienate long-time fans—the album just reinforces how the band are creatively charged and ferociously ambitious." Sputnikmusic critic David Boy gave the album a mixed review, saying, "To give credit where it is due, there is a sense of such improvement, refinement and progression apparent throughout 'Digital Renegade'. Ultimately, however, the way one views this relatively consistent album will depend on a combination of what they have thought of the band's past two LPs, and the ceiling which they place on the genre as a whole. As is once more proven here, the balance of seamless transitions and imaginative song structures is practically impossible to achieve, with anything bordering on conventional seeming well beyond the capabilities of I See Stars."

== Commercial performance ==
Digital Renegade debuted and peaked at number 45 on the Billboard 200 in the United States, making it their highest charting album to date. It also peaked within the top 20 on the Rock Albums Chart, as well as the top 10 on Alternative Albums and Independent Albums Chart.

== Track listing ==
All lyrics written by Andrew and Devin Oliver; all music composed by I See Stars.

Original CD
No.	Title	Length
1.	"Gnars Attacks"	3:29
2.	"NZT48"	4:20
3.	"Digital Renegade"	3:12
4.	"Endless Sky" (featuring Danny Worsnop of Asking Alexandria)	3:33
5.	"Underneath Every Smile"	3:17
6.	"Mystery Wall"	4:08
7.	"iBelieve"	2:38
8.	"Summer Died in Connersville"	3:18
9.	"Electric Forest" (featuring Cassadee Pope)	4:26
10.	"Filth Friends Unite"	3:59
Total length:		36:16

== Personnel ==
I See Stars

- Devin Oliver – clean vocals
- Zach Johnson – unclean vocals, keyboards, synthesizers, sequencer, programming
- Brent Allen – lead guitar
- Jimmy Gregerson – rhythm guitar
- Jeff Valentine – bass guitar
- Andrew Oliver – drums, percussion, backing vocals, lead vocals on "iBelieve"

Additional musicians

- Cassadee Pope (Hey Monday) – guest vocals on "Electric Forest"
- Danny Worsnop (Asking Alexandria) – guest vocals on "Endless Sky"

Production

- Joey Sturgis – production, engineering, mixing, mastering
- Nick Sampson – additional engineering and production
- Jeff Dunne – additional editing

Management

- Brent Mulligan and Bret Disend (Ozone Entertainment) and Carl Severson (Good Fight Entertainment) – management
- Ash Avildsen (The Pantheon Agency) – North America booking, A&R
- Mark Ngui (Creative Artists Agency) – international booking
- Shawn Keith – A&R
- Scott Padell (Padell Business Management) – business management
- Mike McKoy (Serling, Rooks, Ferrara, McKoy & Worob LLP) – legal representation

Artwork

- Mark Brown – cover
- Unlimited Design – interior

== Chart positions ==
Chart (2012)	Peak position
Billboard 200	45
Billboard Rock Albums	15
Billboard Alternative Albums	10
