= Our Last Night =

American rock band

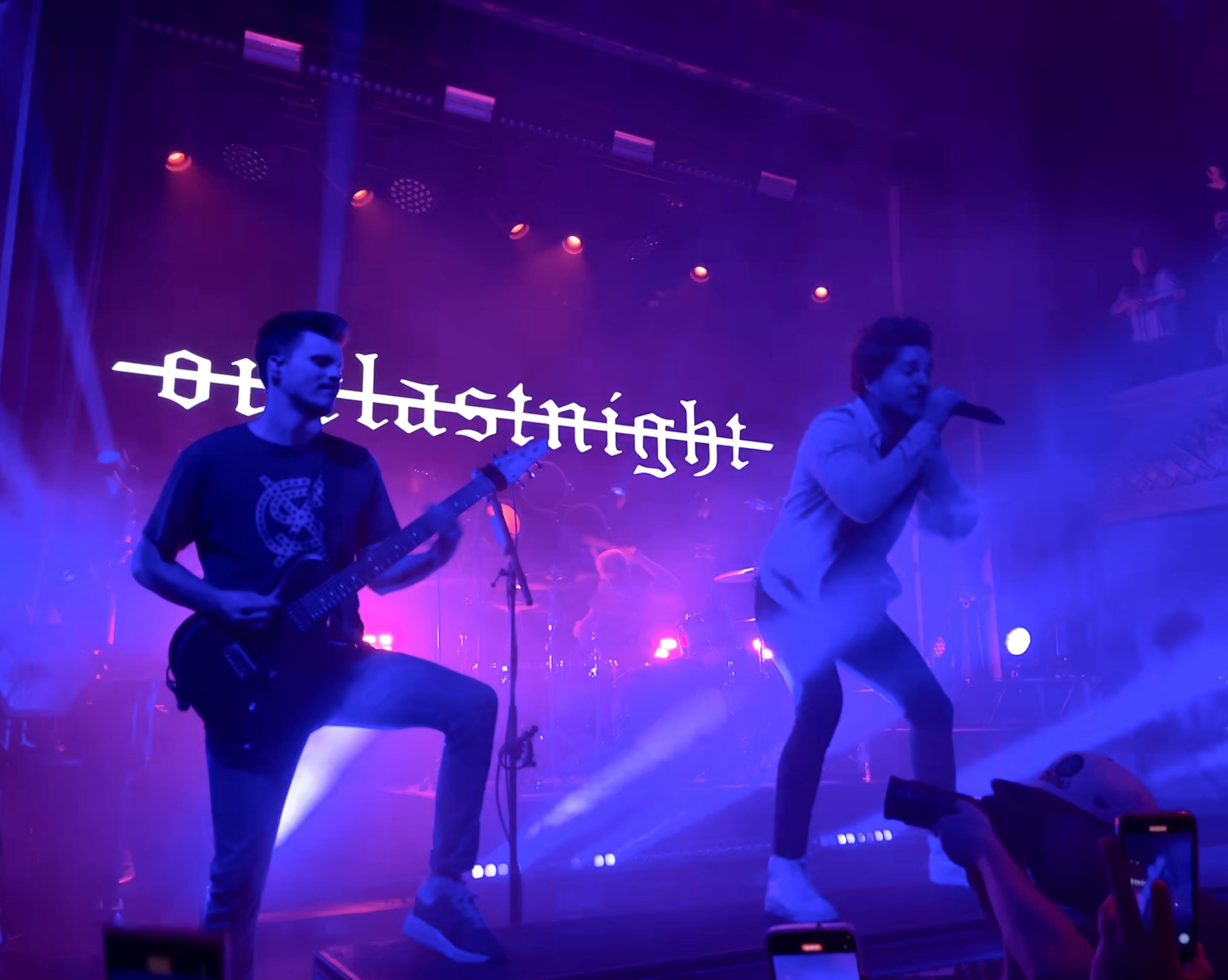
- Our Last Night (2023) performing at August Hall in San Francisco

Background information
- Origin: Hollis, New Hampshire, U.S.
- Genres: Post-hardcore; metalcore; alternative rock; alternative metal
- Years active: 2004–present
- Label: Epitaph
- Members: Trevor Wentworth; Matt Wentworth; Tim Molloy
- Past members: Nick Perricone; Joey Perricone; Woody Woodrow; Matthew Valich; Tim Valich; Colin Perry
- Website: ourlastnight.com

Our Last Night is an American rock band formed in Hollis, New Hampshire in 2004, consisting of brothers Trevor (vocals) and Matthew (guitar, vocals) Wentworth and Timothy Molloy (drums). The band is known for its renditions of popular pop songs.

== History ==
=== Early years (2004–2011) ===
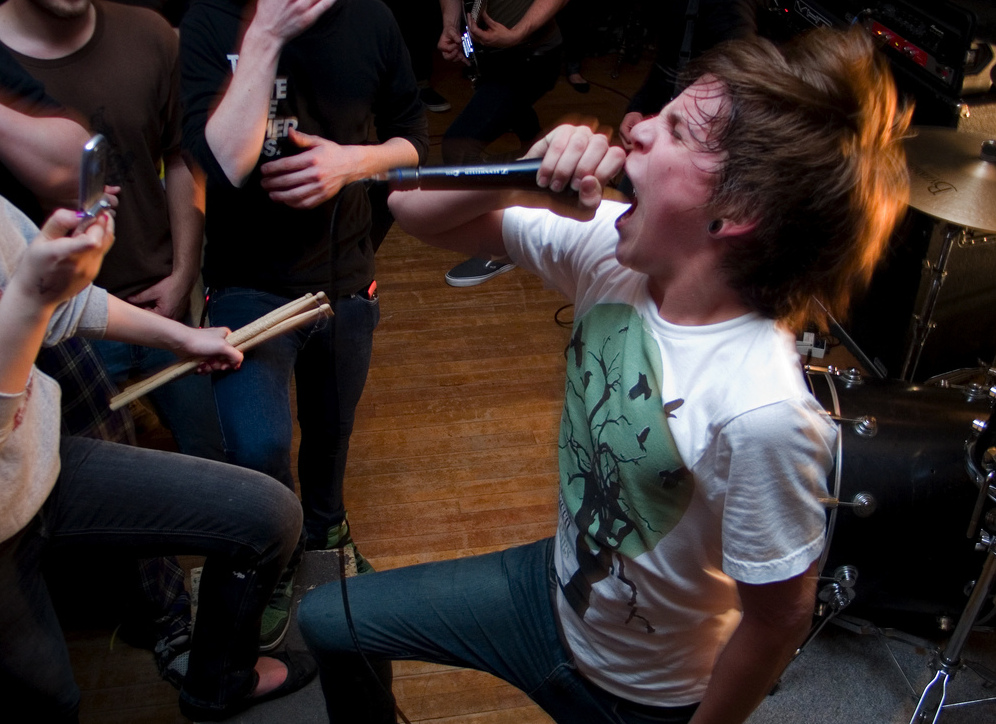
Our Last Night performing in 2008

The band was formed in early 2004 by the brothers Trevor and Matthew Wentworth, Tim and Matthew Valich, and Alex "Woody" Woodrow. They released their first EP, We've Been Holding Back.

On October 17, 2005, the group released their first album, Building Cities from Scratch.

After a few lineup changes, the group was complete in 2006 with Trevor Wentworth (vocals), Matt Wentworth (guitar and vocals), Colin Perry (guitar), Alex "Woody" Woodrow (bass guitar) and Tim Molloy (drums). In early 2007, the group signed with Epitaph Records. The day before they embarked on their first tour, Trevor Wentworth was only 13 years old.

In August 2007, after having spent some time on the local club scene, Our Last Night was signed to Epitaph Records, a label owned by Bad Religion's Brett Gurewitz, and released their second album, The Ghosts Among Us, on March 4, 2008. It peaked at No. 6 on Billboard's Top Heatseekers (Northeast) on March 22, 2008. The group then toured the United States through late 2008, including a prolonged stop in Los Angeles to record new tracks.

We Will All Evolve was produced by Andrew Wade who has worked with A Day to Remember, VersaEmerge, In Fear and Faith, and VEARA. The band toured with From First to Last, We Came as Romans, and A Bullet for a Pretty Boy on Asking Alexandria's headlining tour Welcome to the Circus starting in early May and ending in June. On March 23, 2010, the band changed their Myspace layout to reveal the album cover, and "Elephants", the first track on their upcoming album. On April 7, the band released "Across the Ocean" on their Myspace and Absolutepunk.net. On April 23, they released the music video for "Elephants" on Myspace and different sites. On April 30, they had their official CD release show in support of We Will All Evolve at the Adams Memorial Opera House in Derry, New Hampshire.

On February 1, 2011, they traveled to Tokyo for a co-headlining tour of Japan. On March 19, 2011, they embarked on headlining the "Young & Restless Tour" with Attila, Vanna, Arsonists Get All the Girls, A Bullet for a Pretty Boy, Armor for the Broken, and Across the Sun.

On June 7, 2011, the band uploaded an acoustic version of "Across the Ocean" on their YouTube channel. This marked the first time frontman Trevor Wentworth provided clean vocals instead of his usual unclean vocals on one of the band's tracks. He has provided clean vocals on every original song and cover the band has released ever since, with the exception of "Ivory Tower". On August 27, 2011, the band uploaded a 30-second clip of a new song they have been working on to their Facebook page.

From January 6–27, 2012, the band joined I See Stars on their "Leave It 2 the Suits" tour alongside Stick to Your Guns, Memphis May Fire, and Make Me Famous.

=== Recent years (2012–present) ===
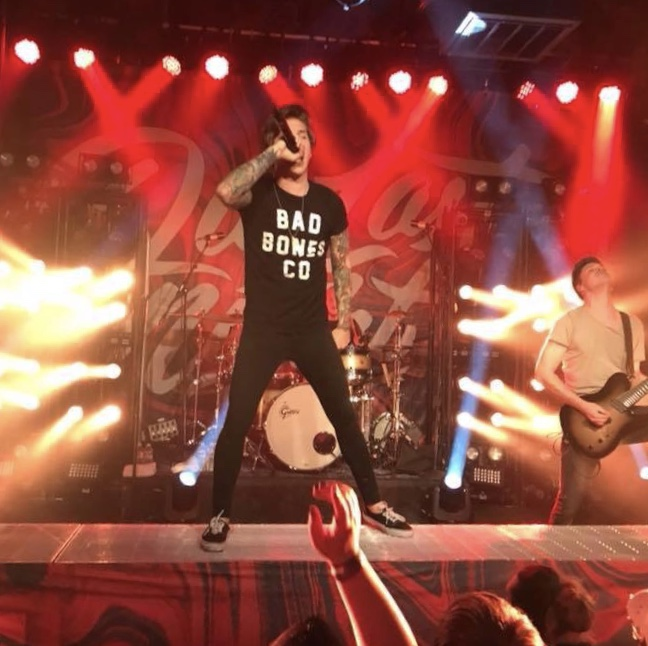
Our Last Night in San Francisco, 2018

After parting ways with Epitaph Records, the band announced, on October 9, 2013, that they were recording two EPs. A bonus cover song was promised after the band was late in releasing a cover in August as a part of their A Summer of Cover series, the band then released their version of Miley Cyrus' song "Wrecking Ball".

On January 7, 2014, the music video for "Sunrise", from the Oak Island EP, was released. The band teamed up with anti-bullying organization The BULLY Project for the video. On January 27, 2014, they released a full-band cover of Katy Perry's song, "Dark Horse" on YouTube and iTunes. On February 11, 2014, the band announced that they would record Oak Island Acoustic after their European tour with SECRETS and Empires Fade, have announced plans to record Oak Island Acoustic after returning to the states from the tour which ends on February 18 in Glasgow, Scotland. They confirmed it will feature all tracks from the Oak Island EP. On May 28, 2014, the band announced that they would unite with Set It Off for a co-headlining tour with support from Heartist and Stages & Stereos. The Come Alive began July 11 in Jacksonville, Florida through August 22 in Boston, Massachusetts. The band also stated that the Boston show will be their 10-Year Anniversary Show. On June 3, 2014, an acoustic video was released for "Same Old War", taken from the acoustic version of their Oak Island EP, which was released on June 24. On July 9, 2014, the band released their cover of the NSYNC's "Bye Bye Bye" featuring vocals from Cody Carson of Set It Off.

On November 4, 2016, the band co-headlined the "Face to Face" two-month US tour

On May 20, 2017, the band released a new single, "Broken Lives". On May 30, 2017, the band announced an EP, Selective Hearing, which was released on June 9.

On June 17, 2022, the band released a new EP entitled "Empires Fall" which included 10 tracks.

In November 15, 2022, the band released an album entitled "Disney Goes Heavy" featuring 23 cover songs from popular Disney movies such as Encanto (2021), The Lion King (1994) and The Nightmare Before Christmas (1993).

On May 9, 2025, the band released an album entitled "Left Alone" which included 10 tracks.

On May 20, 2025, the band announced on Instagram that their upcoming tour, The Final Tour, would be their last in their 21 years as a band. The band cited their priorities to spend more time with their families as the main factor in the decision, while also stating that they do not intend to stop releasing new music.

== Musical style ==
The band's lyrical themes have been compared to We Came as Romans and the Color Morale for their positive messages in their songs that deal with "hope and love in face of depression".

== Band members ==
Current

- Trevor Wentworth (born 1993) – co-lead vocals, additional guitars, programming (2004–present)
- Matt Wentworth (born 1988) – co-lead vocals, lead guitar, piano, programming, keyboards (2004–present)
- Tim Molloy – drums, percussion (2006–present)

Former

- Tim Valich – rhythm guitar (2004–2005)
- Nick Perricone – rhythm guitar (2005–2006)
- Colin Perry – rhythm guitar, backing vocals (2006–2012, 2015–2017)
- Matthew Valich – drums (2004–2005)
- Alex "Woody" Woodrow (born 1987) – bass, backing vocals (2004–2022)
- Joey Perricone – drums (2005–2006) (currently credited as pianist for some of the band's songs)

Touring

- Sean Everett – bass (2023–present)

== Discography ==
Studio albums

- Building Cities from Scratch (2005)
- The Ghosts Among Us (2008)
- We Will All Evolve (2010)
- Age of Ignorance (2012)
- Younger Dreams (2015)
- Let Light Overcome (2019)
- Overcome the Darkness (2019)
- Let Light Overcome the Darkness (2020)
- Decades of Covers (2022)
- Disney Goes Heavy (2022)
- Left Alone (2025)

EPs

- We've Been Holding Back (2004)
- A Summer of Covers (2013)
- Oak Island (2013)
- Oak Island Acoustic (2014)
- Decades of Covers (2016)
- Selective Hearing (2017)
- Empires Fall (2022)

Singles

- Same Old War (2013)
- Common Ground (2016)
- Pay Attention (2024)

Compilation albums

- New Noise (Epitaph) (2010)
- Worship and Tributes: Volume II (Rocksound) (2019)
