= We Will All Evolve =

Studio album by Our Last Night
- Released: May 4, 2010
- Genres: Post-hardcore, metalcore
- Length: 38:19
- Label: Epitaph
- Producer: Andrew Wade

Our Last Night chronology
The Ghosts Among Us (2008)	We Will All Evolve (2010)	Age of Ignorance (2012)

We Will All Evolve is the third studio album by New Hampshire-based band Our Last Night. It was released on Epitaph Records. It was released on May 4, 2010. On March 23, the band changed their MySpace layout to reveal the album cover and they also added a song, "Elephants", along with the lyrics. On April 7, a second song, "Across the Ocean", was released on AbsolutePunk.

== Track listing ==
All tracks are written by Matt Wentworth.

No.	Title	Length
1.	"Elephants"	3:31
2.	"The Air I Breathe"	4:07
3.	"Mouth Machine Gun"	3:19
4.	"Across the Ocean"	4:22
5.	"Deceiver"	4:10
6.	"The Devil Inside You"	4:00
7.	"Distance Is Destroying Me"	3:02
8.	"Carry Me to Safety"	3:40
9.	"Into the Future"	3:35
10.	"We Will All Evolve"	4:33
Total length:		38:19

Professional ratings
Review scores
Source	Rating
AllMusic	3/5 stars

== Personnel ==
Our Last Night

- Trevor Wentworth – lead vocals, additional guitars, bass
- Matt Wentworth – lead guitar, bass, piano, clean vocals
- Colin Perry – guitar
- Tim Molloy – drums

Production

- Andrew Wade – producer
- David Bendeth – mixing
