= Mobile Suit Gundam: Extreme Vs. =

2010 video game

- Cover art for the Full Boost edition
- Developer: Namco Bandai Games
- Publisher: Namco Bandai Games
- Platforms: Arcade; PlayStation 3 PlayStation 4
- Release: Arcade: JP: September 28, 2010; PlayStation 3: JP: December 1, 2011; Full Boost (Arcade): JP: April 5, 2012; Full Boost (PlayStation 3): JP: January 30, 2014; Maxi Boost (Arcade): JP: March 6, 2014; Maxi Boost ON (Arcade): JP: March 9, 2016; Maxi Boost ON (PlayStation 4): WW: July 30, 2020; 2 (Arcade): JP: October 30, 2018; 2 XBoost (Arcade): JP: March 10, 2021; 2 OverBoost (Arcade): JP: June 28, 2023; 2 Infinite Boost (Arcade): JP: July 17, 2025
- Genres: Fighting; Mecha; Sci-Fi
- Modes: Single-player, Multiplayer
- Arcade system: Namco System 357, Namco System ES3

Mobile Suit Gundam: Extreme Vs. (機動戦士ガンダム エクストリームバーサス) is a series of 3D arcade fighting games and the second latest in the series of Gundam VS video game series developed and published by Namco Bandai Games. Extreme Vs. is the sequel to Capcom's Mobile Suit Gundam: Gundam vs. Gundam NEXT. The game was first unveiled at the AOU 2010 and released on September 28, 2010. The game was later released on the PlayStation 3 on December 1, 2011, featuring balance tweaks.

The game's theme song is titled "The Catalyst", performed by Linkin Park. Bandai and the band also cooperated in the development of a special limited edition HGUC 1/144 RX-78GP01-Fb Gundam Zephyranthes Full Vernian model kit molded in colors and including detail stickers inspired by the cover art for A Thousand Suns.

Over its lifetime, the game has received multiple updates that have also adjusted the name of the title. The first update, Mobile Suit Gundam: Extreme Vs. Full Boost (機動戦士ガンダム エクストリームバーサス フルブースト), was released in arcades on April 5, 2012. The update includes 74 mobile suits with new units added monthly via network. The theme song for Full Boost is titled "Fight It Out (Pay Money to my Pain)" (feat. K), performed by both Akihiro Namba of Hi-Standard and Takeshi Ueda of AA=. Full Boost later released on the PlayStation 3 adding more mobile suits than the arcade version as downloadable content.

Another update, Mobile Suit Gundam: Extreme Vs. Maxi Boost (機動戦士ガンダム エクストリームバーサス マキシブースト), was released in arcades on March 6, 2014. This update introduced both new suits and characters as well as new game mechanics such as a revamped EX Mode and changes to forms for certain units. The theme song for Maxi Boost is titled "Rave-up Tonight", performed by Fear, and Loathing in Las Vegas.

A further update, Mobile Suit Gundam: Extreme Vs. Maxi Boost ON (機動戦士ガンダム エクストリームバーサス マキシブースト ON), was released in arcades on March 9, 2016. This update provided online matching system for the arcade and introduced even more mobile suits and characters along with balance changes. The theme song for Maxi Boost ON is titled "No Future", performed by SiM. In January 2020 it was announced that Maxi Boost ON would be released worldwide on July 30, 2020 to the PlayStation 4. The PlayStation 4 version includes a few new mobile suits not available in the arcade version.

A sequel, Mobile Suit Gundam: Extreme Vs. 2 (機動戦士ガンダム エクストリームバーサス 2), was released on the Namco System ES3 in arcades on October 30, 2018. The game introduced both newer suits and characters and had HD definition screen on the arcade. The theme song for 2 is titled "Revolution", performed by Coldrain. An update to Extreme Vs. 2, Mobile Suit Gundam Extreme Vs. 2 XBoost (機動戦士ガンダム エクストリームバーサス2 クロスブースト), was released in arcades on March 10, 2021. The game marks the 10th anniversary of the Extreme Vs. series, and includes new suits and battle systems. The theme song for XBoost is titled "RedZone", performed by Crossfaith. A further update to Extreme Vs. 2, Mobile Suit Gundam Extreme Vs. 2 OverBoost (機動戦士ガンダム エクストリームバーサス2 オーバーブースト), was released in arcades on June 28, 2023. The game includes new suits and battle systems, such as the addition of Vertical Burst. The theme song for OverBoost is titled "OVER BOOST", performed by the Bandai Namco internal sound team. A further, further update to Extreme Vs. 2, Mobile Suit Gundam Extreme Vs. 2 Infinite Boost (機動戦士ガンダム エクストリームバーサス2 インフィニットブースト), was released in arcades on July 17, 2025. The game includes new suits and new stages. The theme song for Infinite Boost is titled "X_Axis", performed by Survive Said The Prophet.

== Gameplay ==
Extreme Vs. retains the trademark gameplay of previous installments of the Gundam Vs. series, with a few adjustments and changes. During a standard arcade battle, each team is given a resource meter of 6000 points; when a mobile suit is shot down, its cost is deducted from the meter, and the first team to hit 0 loses. Each mobile suit costs 3000, 2500, 2000, or 1000 points, with higher cost machines being more powerful while cheaper machines are much weaker. A few missions, particularly boss battles, eschew this in favor of making a single machine the target and having its defeat be the goal of the stage (the player's side still has a resource meter and will lose as normal if it is depleted).

Mobile Suit Gundam Extreme VS Maxi Boost has major changes since its update from Full Boost, the previous version; all 1000 points units are up 500 each, so it is 1500 points in total. The 1000-cost mobile units' HP, and other ammos are now up since it has added by 500 points, so the weapons are also up and they're now par with 2000 cost mobile suits in terms of skill speed (e.g. Gundam 00 Colasour GNX-III's [Note: Normal/Powered] cost 1000 -> 1500, HP 330 -> 480, main ammo [A] 40/60 -> 60/90, sub [ab] 3/6 -> 6/9, and enough mobility).

Gameplay makes use of four primary buttons: Shoot, Melee, Jump, and Search. There are also three sub-commands used by pressing Shoot and Melee (Sub-Weapon), Shoot and Jump (Special Shooting) and Melee and Jump (Special Melee). In addition to these, machines can have two different charge attacks, activated by holding the Shoot or Melee button until a meter on the ammunition display fills.

Extreme Vs. adds in two important gameplay changes. Extreme Action is the ability to dash-cancel one's attacks, allowing the player to string together larger and more damaging combos. Extreme Burst is a super mode, similar to older games' Awakenings, activated by pressing Shoot, Melee, and Jump together when a meter at the bottom of the screen is filled. All playable machines also have a super-powerful Burst Attack, executed by pressing Shoot, Melee, and Jump together while Extreme Burst is active. Full Boost will give Burst Attacks to every mobile suit in the game.

The PlayStation 3 release adds Trial Mission Mode, which features a series of specific challenges that go outside the normal conditions of the game, such as destroying a set number of machines within a time limit or sinking a battleship such as the Argama or Archangel. Trial Mission Mode features a number of enemy-exclusive mobile suits from all the included series, as well as a number of new boss characters.

== Story ==
=== Gundam EXA ===
The story takes place in unnamed timeline, where humanity has highly advanced technology. However, the human population is decreasing and it seems that they're on their way to extinction. The protagonists are Leos Alloy, Sthesia Awar and their Haro. They work on a Jupiter base called "Jupiter X", using "General Answer" (or "GA") which contains a massive repository of data about the previous eras of humanity, Leos travels to the Earths' of the previous eras in an effort to collect data that might give them a hint for the evolution of mankind.

=== Gundam EXA VS ===
Some time after the events of one year, Sthesia Awar informs Leos Alloy that she discovered a new GA data cluster from a computer outside of Jupiter X. The two dive into the new data and find themselves in the Universal Century, during the attack on Side 7. However, after entering the colony, they find that the inside was in ruins, and the RX-78-02 Gundam has been destroyed before it could be activated by Amuro Ray.The two discover a faint life sign in the colony, the source of which is Themis Chiron, a G-Diver from Saturn II. Chiron warns the two to get away as soon as possible, or they would be caught in the conquest of Mars I.

=== Mobile Suit Gundam N-Extreme ===
One day, Sai Amagi and Chikage Ebihara are transported to another world by a mysterious woman who wants them to save the world. From the cockpit of the N-Extreme Gundam, these two are surprised by the world they witness.

== Playable suits ==
The arcade version initially had around 40 suits, such as FA-010S, MS-06FZ Zaku II, MSN-04 Sazabi, MSZ-006 Zeta, RX-78-2, RX-78GP02A Physalis, RX-93 Nu and XXXG-00W0 Wing Gundam Zero EW. Suits such as MSN-02 Zeong and PMX-003 The O were added to the PS3 version. Suits such as NZ-000 Queen Mansa feature as bosses. Suits such as GF13-001NHII Master and MSM-04 Acguy were added via updates.

The release of 2 XBoost brings the total to over 220 suits.

== Characters ==
Gundam EXA and Gundam EXA VS

Leos Alloy (レオス・アロイ, Reosu Aroi)
Voiced by Nobuhiko Okamoto.

== Reception ==
Reception

Aggregate score
Aggregator	Score
Metacritic	78

Review scores
Publication	Score
Computer Games Magazine	85%
Destructoid	85
Eurogamer	60
Famitsu	33/40
Push Square	80
Shacknews	80
The Games Machine (UK)	83
USgamer	70%

Forbes praised the balance, and said it "has an extensive singleplayer setup to keep any Gundam fan occupied. Put simply, this is a thoroughbred multiplayer game with an immense amount of depth and variety."

Push Square said "there's a massive amount of metal-mashing fun to be found. As both a comprehensive gameplay package, and as a celebration of all things Gundam, it's very, very hard to fault."

In Japan, Extreme VS. Maxiboost ON reached #1 in the sales charts, selling more than twice as many copies as second-placed Animal Crossing: New Horizons.
