= 3-D (I See Stars album) =

2009 album by I See Stars

Studio album by I See Stars
- Released: April 14, 2009
- Studios: Chango Gridlock Studios, Lake Mary, Florida
- Genres: Electronicore; post-hardcore; metalcore
- Length: 32:36
- Label: Sumerian
- Producer: Cameron Mizell

I See Stars chronology
| I See Stars (2008) | 3-D (2009) | The End of the World Party (2011) |

Professional ratings
Review scores
| Source | Rating |
|---|---|
| AbsolutePunk | 75% |
| Allmusic | 4/5 stars |

3-D is the debut album by the American electronicore band I See Stars. The album debuted at number 176 on the Billboard 200, number 5 on Top Heatseekers, and number 22 on Top Independent Albums. The songs "Save the Cheerleader" and "The Big Bad Wolf" were both re-recorded from the band's first EP, Green Light Go!. The singles "The Common Hours", "3D" and "Where the Sidewalk Ends", were also re-recorded, having been previously released as demos.

Shortly after the album release, keyboardist/unclean vocalist Zach Johnson was briefly replaced by Chris Moore who only appeared on the band's cover of the Outfield's Your Love on Fearless Records's Punk Goes Classic Rock in 2010 before Johnson's return the same year.

== Track listing ==
All lyrics written by Andrew and Devin Oliver, all music composed by I See Stars.

Original CD
| No. | Title | Length |
|---|---|---|
| 1. | "Project Wakeup" | 2:25 |
| 2. | "The Common Hours" | 3:07 |
| 3. | "3D" | 3:11 |
| 4. | "Save the Cheerleader, Save the World" | 4:06 |
| 5. | "The Big Bad Wolf" | 3:41 |
| 6. | "I Am Jack's Smirking Revenge" | 3:08 |
| 7. | "The Ocean" | 1:10 |
| 8. | "Comfortably Confused" | 3:00 |
| 9. | "Where the Side Walk Ends" | 2:25 |
| 10. | "Sing This!" (featuring Bizzy Bone of Bone Thugs-n-Harmony) | 3:00 |
| 11. | "What This Means to Me" | 3:27 |
| Total length: | | 32:36 |

Note

- "Save the Cheerleader" is printed in its full title "Save the Cheerleader, Save the World" on vinyl release and on some online retailers.

== Personnel ==
I See Stars

- Devin Oliver – clean vocals
- Zach Johnson – unclean vocals, keyboards, synthesizers, sequencer, programming
- Brent Allen – lead guitar
- Jimmy Gregerson – rhythm guitar
- Jeff Valentine – bass guitar
- Andrew Oliver – drums, percussion, backing vocals

Production

- Cameron Mizell - production, mastering and mixing
- James Paul Wisner - pre-production
- Shawn Keith - A&R
