= Electronicore =

Fusion genre of metalcore and electronic music

- Other names: Synthcore; trancecore
- Stylistic origins: Metalcore; electronic
- Cultural origins: 2000s; Europe, North America, and East Asia
- Typical instruments: Vocals; Vocaloid; Vocoder; electric guitar; bass guitar; drums; electronic drums; synthesizer; sequencer; DJ mixer; turntables; keyboard; sampler; digital audio workstation; audio editing software; drum machine; bass synthesizer; groovebox; MIDI; percussion; programming

Other topics
- Digital hardcore; electropunk; industrial metal; drum and bass; dubstep; Nintendocore; crunkcore; Risecore

Electronicore (also known as synthcore or trancecore) is a fusion genre of metalcore music with elements of various electronic music genres, often including trance, electronica, and dubstep. Electronicore emerged in the early 2000s. The British band Enter Shikari, founded in 2003, is considered a pioneer. However, several online magazines attribute a pioneering role in this genre to the band I See Stars, due to their debut album 3-D, which was very well known within the scene.

== Reception ==
Attack Attack! is often recognized as the primary American contributor of the style, being inspired by British band Enter Shikari. Enter Shikari is an electronicore band that began in 1999 as Hybryd, adding their last member and adopting their current name in early 2003, in St Albans, England. The group has received international radio airplay and a substantial number of musical awards, from Kerrang!, NME, Rock Sound Magazine and BT Digital Music Awards. They express a relationship with electronic music genres such as trance and have been referred to as the "kings of trancecore." Their second album, titled Common Dreads, was released in June 2009 and debuted on the UK Albums Chart at 16. In 2020, British band Bring Me The Horizon released Post Human: Survival Horror, which has notable elements of electronicore in a few tracks such as 1x1 which features duo Nova Twins.

== Characteristics ==
Electronicore is characterized by typical metalcore instrumentation, breakdowns, and heavy use of sequencers, conventional instrument recorded-note samplers, electronic tone-generating synthesizers, auto-tuned singing, and screamed vocals. The genre often features dynamic transitions from soft electronica ballads to intense metalcore passages. However, the degree to which metalcore characteristics are incorporated may vary. In addition to electronica, the fusion may involve a variety of other electronic music genres, including techno, trance, dubstep, electro, and dance.

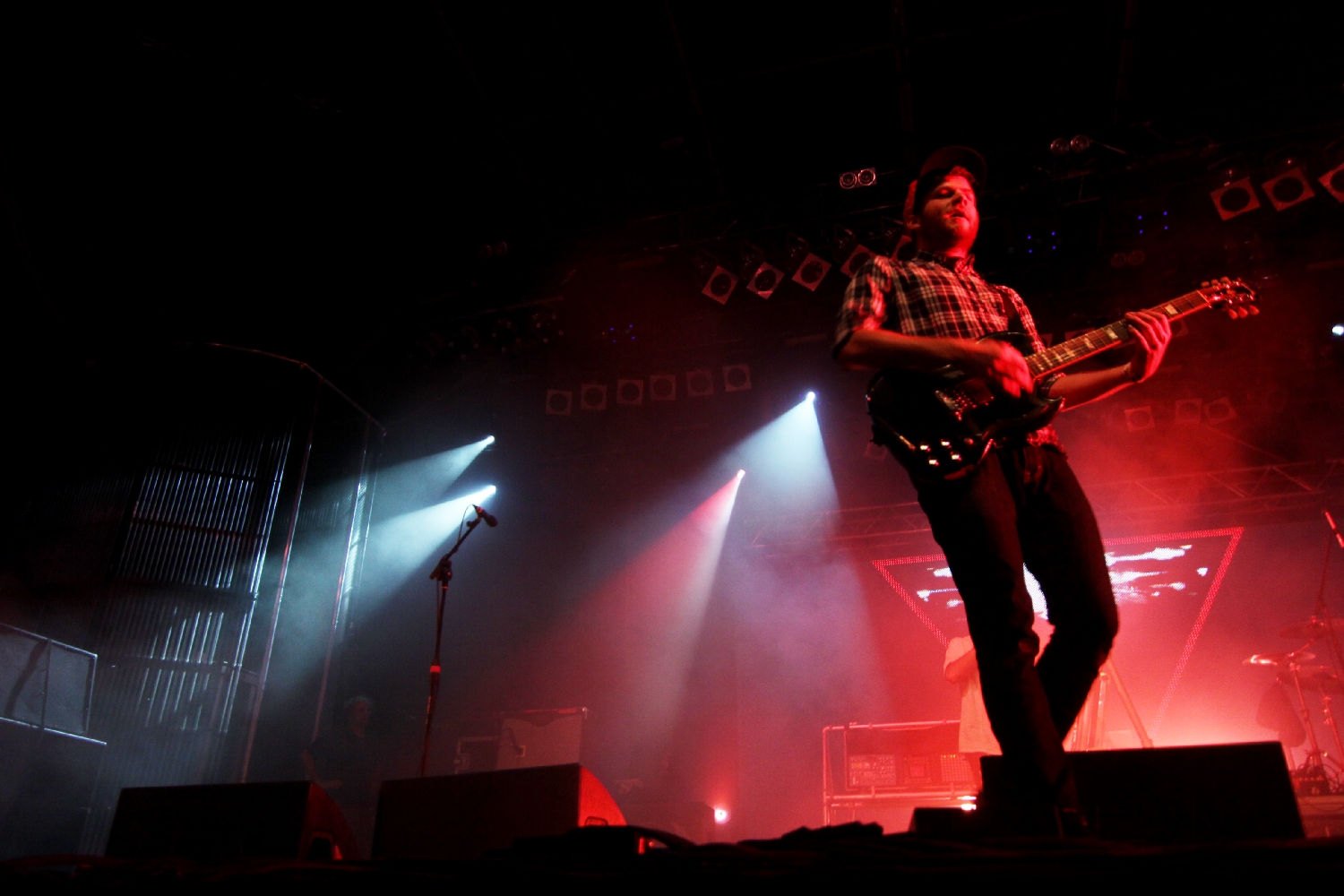
Enter Shikari's guitarist Rory Clewlow playing at VOLT festival, Sopron, Hungary, in 2012

== Related musical styles ==
- Nintendocore is a rock music genre that includes elements of chiptune. It is a derivative form of post-hardcore.
- Crunkcore is a musical genre that combines post-hardcore with crunk and characteristics of electronic music.
- Digital hardcore is a music genre fusing elements of hardcore punk and various forms of electronic music and techno. It developed in Germany during the early 1990s, and often features sociological or left-wing lyrical themes.

== See also ==
- List of electronicore bands
- Electronic rock
- Electropunk
- Industrial metal
- Dance-punk
- Crabcore
- Trap metal
- Metalstep
