= Fire in the Attic =

German post-hardcore band

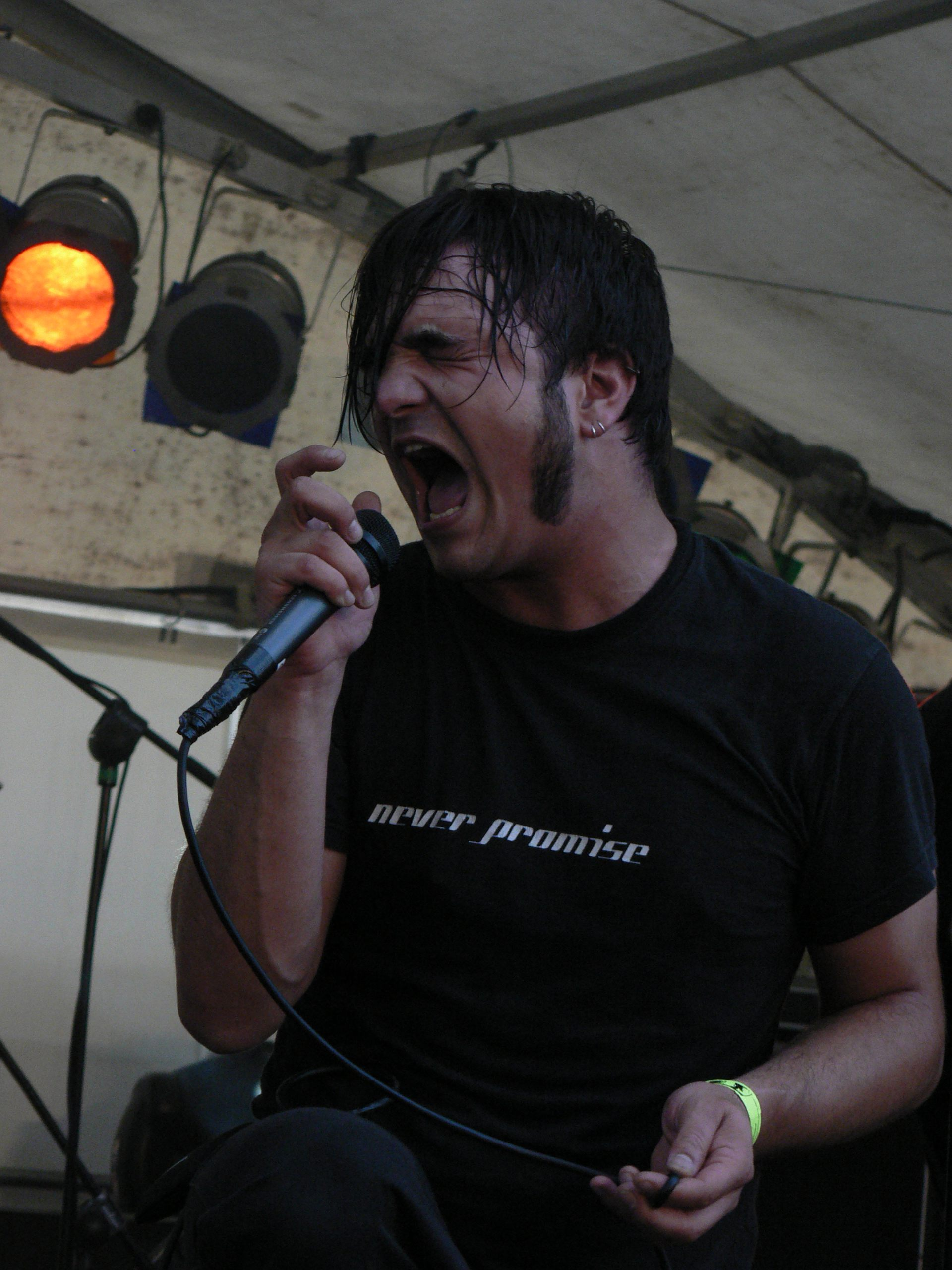
- Ole Feltes

Background information
- Origin: Bonn, North Rhine-Westphalia, Germany
- Genres: Alternative rock
- Years active: Since 2003
- Labels: Redfield Records
- Members: Thomas Prescott; Richard Meyer; Daniel Crebelli; Dennis Meyer; Daniel Plotzki
- Website: Official site

Fire in the Attic is a German Post-Hardcore band, founded in October 2003 in Bonn. The band features singer Ole Feltes, guitarists Richard Meyer and Daniel Crebelli, bassist Dennis Meyer and drummer Daniel Plotzki. All musicians played in former bands Summer´s Last Regret and Fastplant.

== Biography ==
The first CD the band released was the Decision & Action EP in May 2004. In 2004 FITA opened for bands like Billy Talent and Coheed and Cambria. In April 2005 the album début Crash/Rebuild followed on the EP. The same year FITA played some support gigs with groups like Taking Back Sunday, Hot Water Music, Millencolin, Finch and Boysetsfire. Fire in the Attic played on Rheinkultur 2005 in front of more than 145,000 people.

On 2 June 2006 the band released their second studio album I´ll Beat You, City!. The album was released on German label Redfield Records (We Butter the Bread with Butter, Face Tomorrow, Heroes & Zeros and more) and published on Cargo Records. In May and June 2006 the band supported Alexisonfire and Moneen on their German tour. In November 2006 FITA shared stage at the Taste of Chaos 2006s tour with Anti-Flag.

On 18 April 2008 the band released their third album Cum Grano Salis. Two days before official release date the whole album was published on German magazine VISIONS and had sold over 87,000 copies.

In August 2008 singer Ole Feltes left FITA. He was replaced by British singer Thomas Prescott of Kenai.

On 13 March 2009 the band released their fourth self-titled studio album on Redfield Records. Since 2009 the band paused.

== Musical style ==
The band's musical style often was compared with Emocore. FITA is a post-hardcore band with harder and melodic screams since 2008 when Thomas Prescott became lead vocalist of the band. The music often was compared with the band Thrice. The band uses influences of Alternative rock and modern Emocore.

== Discography ==
=== EPs ===
- 2004: Decision & Action (Redfield Records)

=== Albums ===
- 2005: Crash/Rebuild (Redfield Records)
- 2006: I´ll Beat You, City! (Redfield Records)
- 2008: Cum grano Salis (Redfield Records)
- 2009: Fire in the Attic (Redfield Records)
