= Infamous (Abandon All Ships album) =

Studio album by Abandon All Ships
- Released: July 3, 2012
- Studio: City Tape Studios, Toronto, ON
- Genre: Electronicore; metalcore; electronic rock
- Length: 32:41
- Label: Rise; Velocity; Redfield; Underground Operations; Universal Music Canada
- Producer: Anthony Calabretta; Mark Spicoluk

Abandon All Ships chronology
Geeving (2010)	Infamous (2012)	Malocchio (2014)

Singles from Infamous
- 1. "Infamous" Released: May 1, 2012

Infamous is the second studio album by Canadian electronicore band Abandon All Ships. It was released on July 3, 2012, through Rise Records. Infamous debuted at number 142 on the Billboard 200, selling more than 3,500 copies within its first week of release, while also reaching number 54 on the Canadian Albums Chart.

== Background ==
On January 18, 2012, the band announced that they were in the process or recording their second studio album, which they initially intended for a late-spring or early-summer release. The album was produced by Anthony Calabretta and Mark Spicoluk. The track listing was revealed on May 22, 2012.

== Release ==
The album's lead single, "Infamous," features guest rap vocals by Canadian hip-hop duo A-Game. A music video for the song was released on May 1, 2012, which the band described as "very Toronto." On June 12, "Good Old Friend" was available for streaming. The album was officially released on July 3. On November 14, the band premiered the music video for "August". They released a music video for "Less Than Love" in June 2013.

== Critical reception ==
Professional ratings
Review scores
Source	Rating
AbsolutePunk	19%
Alternative Press	3.5/5 stars
Ultimate Guitar	5.5/10 stars

Infamous was met with mixed reviews from music critics. AbsolutePunk gave a negative review for the album stating, "This album is the epitome of all the bad things from Geeving, from the overdone auto-tune choruses to the simplistic chugging and occasional four chord song structure that plagued Geeving." Phil Freeman of Alternative Press gave a positive review remarking, "Abandon All Ships, who bounce merrily from roaring just-this-side-of-misogynistic threats over downtuned chugga-chugga riffs to crooning rapturous love lyrics over delicate keyboards and whooshing anime-soundtrack synth patches... these five Canadians approach 21st century electro-screamo and deathcore with the same giddy, goofy fervor their countrymen in Chromeo exhibit while wallowing in '80s R&B cliché."

== Track listing ==
All tracks are written by Abandon All Ships.

No.	Title	Length
1.	"Good Old Friend"	2:34
2.	"Infamous" (featuring A-Game)	3:25
3.	"Less Than Love"	3:17
4.	"Ahmed"	2:28
5.	"American Holocaust" (featuring Jonny OC of Liferuiner)	2:54
6.	"August"	3:46
7.	"Forever Lonely"	3:47
8.	"Made of Gold"	4:04
9.	"Faded"	3:20
10.	"Brothers for Life" (featuring XbikerackX)	3:00
Total length:		32:41

== Personnel ==
Credits for Infamous adapted from AllMusic.

Abandon All Ships

- Angelo Aita – lead vocals and composer
- Martin Broda – clean vocals, bass guitar and composer, lead vocals on track 6
- Daniel Ciccotelli – lead guitar
- Sebastian Cassisi-Nunez – synthesizers, keyboards, programming and composer
- Chris Taylor – drums, percussion and composer

Additional musicians

- A-Game – guest vocals on track 2
- Jonny OC – guest vocals on track 5
- XbikerackX – guest vocals on track 10

Production

- Anthony Calabretta – production, engineering
- João Carvalho – engineering, mastering
- Thomas Gutches – management
- Steve Haining – photography
- Dan Hand – management
- Colin Lewis – booking
- Simon Paul – artwork
- Dave Shapiro – booking
- Mark Spicoluk – production, management
- Marco Walzel – booking

== Charts ==
Chart performance for Infamous
Chart (2012)	Peak position
Canadian Albums (Billboard)	54
US Billboard 200	142
US Heatseekers Albums (Billboard)	3
US Top Rock Albums (Billboard)	50
