= Kuchen (disambiguation) =

Kuchen is the German word for cake and is used in other languages as the name for several different types of sweet desserts, pastries, and gateaux.

Kuchen may also refer to:

- Audrey Kuchen, television news reporter
- Dick Kuchen, basketball coach
- Fritz Kuchen (1877–1973), sport shooter
- Kuchen, Baden-Württemberg

== See also ==
- Backe, backe Kuchen, a children's rhyme
