= Der Tag an dem die Welt unterging =

2010 studio album by We Butter the Bread with Butter

Studio album by We Butter the Bread with Butter
- Released: 14 May 2010
- Recorded: 2008–2010
- Genre: Deathcore; metalcore; electronicore
- Length: 42:18
- Label: Redfield
- Producer: Marcel "Marci" Neumann

We Butter the Bread with Butter chronology
Das Monster aus dem Schrank (2008)	Der Tag an dem die Welt unterging (2010)	Goldkinder (2012)

Der Tag an dem die Welt unterging (German for "the day the world went down") is the second full-length studio album by German deathcore band We Butter the Bread with Butter. It was released on 14 May 2010 through Redfield Records. It is the band's second consecutive, and final, studio album to feature Tobias Schultka and is the band's first studio album to feature Maximilian Pauly Saux on bass, Can Özgünsür on drums and Kenneth Iain Duncan as the second guitarist. Tobias Schultka himself created the artwork for the album.

== Style, background, and recording ==
Musically, "Der Tag an dem die Welt unterging" is similar to its predecessor, "Das Monster aus dem Schrank." With "Der kleine Vampir," the band recorded their first song, which, apart from the interlude "Schiff Ahoi," is rather calm and melodic. This track contains no metal elements except for the vocals; it is a pure electro track. In general, this album features more electro elements than its predecessor. The band stated in an interview that they feel equally drawn to pop music and extreme metal. The lyrics are "simply there." There is no deeper meaning.

== Review ==
Bloodchamber.de writes about the album: "WBTBWB are nothing more and nothing less than a slightly above-average deathcore band on 'Der Tag An Dem Die Welt Unterging'. You'll be waiting in vain for the brilliant moments that were so numerous and so wonderfully unexpected on their previous album." ... "Despite being a step down from its predecessor, the album is still a solid, entertaining piece of music." (6.5/10)

Time For Metal, on the other hand, awarded it 8.5 out of 10 points: "Der Tag An Dem Die Welt Unterging isn't for everyone, but it's top-notch German deathcore and, apart from some occasional over-the-top moments, has no flaws." to demonstrate."

== Track listing ==
No.	Title	Length
1.	"Der Anfang vom Ende" (The Beginning of the End)"	1:48
2.	"Der Tag an dem die Welt unterging" (The Day the World Went Down)"	3:35
3.	"Oh Mama mach Kartoffelsalat" (Oh Mama Make Potato Salad)"	2:21
4.	"Alptraumsong" (Nightmare Song)"	3:22
5.	"Superföhn Bananendate" (Super Hairdryer Banana Dating)"	3:02
6.	"3008"	1:53
7.	"Glühwürmchen" (Firefly)"	3:53
8.	"Sabine die Zeitmaschine" (Sabine the Time Machine)"	3:10
9.	"Der kleine Vampir" (The Little Vampire)"	3:29
10.	"13 Wünsche" (13 Wishes)"	3:10
11.	"Schiff Ahoi" (Ship Ahoy)"	0:37
12.	"Wir gehen an Land" (We Go Ashore)"	2:25
13.	"Mein Baumhaus" (My Tree House)"	2:21
14.	"Feueralarm" (Fire Alarm)"	3:19
15.	"Das Ende" (The End)"	3:53
Total length:		42:18

== Personnel ==
- Tobias "Tobi" Schultka – vocals, drums, programming
- Marcel "Marci" Neumann – lead guitar, programming
- Kenneth Iain Duncan - rhythm guitar
- Maximilian Pauly Saux – bass guitar
- Can Özgünsür – drums
