= John Coffey (band) =

Dutch punk band

- Origin: Utrecht, Netherlands
- Genres: Punk rock, post-hardcore, rock and roll
- Years active: 2005–2016,2022-present
- Labels: Sally Forth Records, Redfield Records, V2 Records, Elektra Records Benelux
- Members: David Achter de Molen; Alfred van Luttikhuizen; Christoffer van Teijlingen; Richard van Luttikhuizen; Carsten Brunsveld
- Past members: Art van Triest; Twan van Eikelenboom
- Website: www.johncoffey.nl

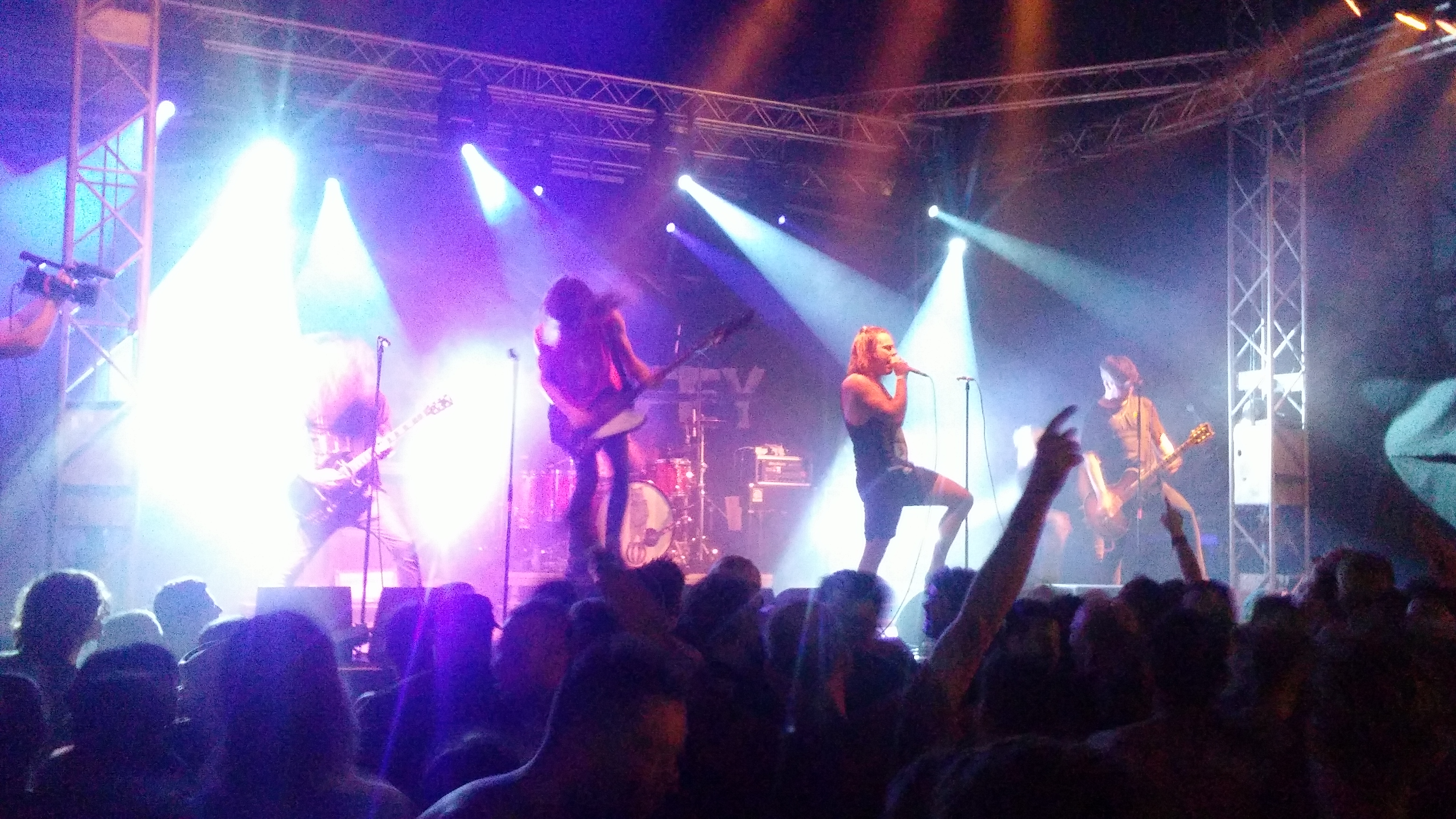
John Coffey (band)

John Coffey is a Dutch punk rock/post-hardcore band from Utrecht.

John Coffey is influenced by bands such as Refused, Every Time I Die, and The Ghost of a Thousand. The band's name is a reference to the character John Coffey from the movie The Green Mile directed by Frank Darabont (based on the serialized novel by Stephen King).

The band gained a lot of interest when a video and GIF went viral of the singer catching a beer while he was standing on the crowd.

== History ==
=== Vanity ===
In the autumn of 2008 the band recorded its debut album Vanity with Dutch producer Martijn Groeneveld (who recorded amongst others Face Tomorrow, The Spirit That Guides Us and Blaudzun ). Vanity was released in October 2009 by Sally Forth Records/Munich Records. The first thousand copies of the CD were pierced by a bullet. The album was well-received by the Dutch press and received attention from OOR, Live XS, FRET, Rocktribune, and UP. The band toured in various countries including Germany, Great Britain and Sweden.

=== Bright Companions; new line-up ===
In June 2010 the band announced the departure of vocalist Art van Triest and guitarist Twan Eikelenboom. Eikelenboom was immediately replaced by Christoffer van Teijlingen. Van Triest was replaced in the fall of 2010, by David Achter de Molen. In the fall of 2010 and early 2011 the band started working on a new record.

In the autumn of 2011 the band recorded a new album in Studio Grondahl in Swedish Stockholm with producer Pelle Gunnerfeldt, which among other recorded Swedish bands like The Hives and Refused. Assistant producer was former guitarist of The Ghost of a Thousand, Jag Jago. The recording of this album was partly made possible by fans. In 2011 they completed a fundraising campaign on the crowdfunding music website SellaBand.

In May 2012 it was announced that the band would release a new album in September 2012 titled Bright Companions. Along with this news, the band released the first single from the album, "Romans".

The second single, "Featherless Redheads", was released exclusively at 3voor12 in August 2012.

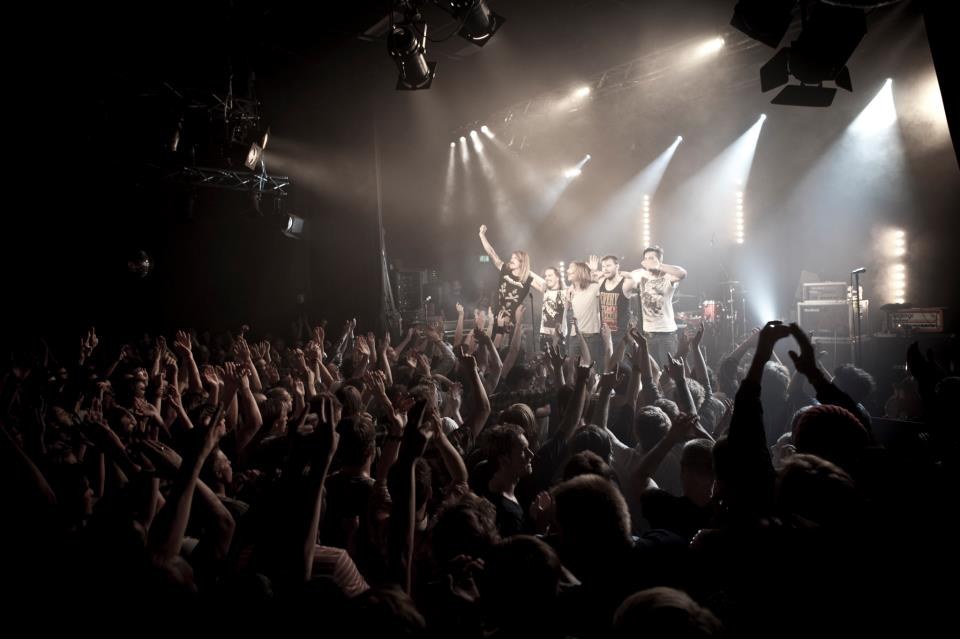
John Coffey during Releaseshow in Tivoli

In September 2012 "Bright Companions" was released across Europe by the German music label, Redfield Records. The album gained a lot of positive reviews in the Dutch and International press. Articles appeared in Dutch, German and Belgian music magazine OOR, Visions Magazine, Rocktribune, Guitarist, and Fuze Magazine.

=== Hiatus ===
On 19 May 2016, the band announced they had decided to "put the band on hold", "We don’t want to say farewell, but we won’t be making music these coming years".

=== Comeback ===
On 3 March 2023 the band announced their comeback on Instagram: 'We're back baby!'.

== Members ==
Current members

- David Achter de Molen – lead vocals (2010–present)
- Alfred van Luttikhuizen – guitar, vocals (2002–present)
- Christoffer van Teilingen – guitar, vocals (2010–present)
- Richard van Luttikhuizen – bass, vocals (2002–present)
- Carsten Brunsveld – drums (2002–present)

Former members

- Art van Triest – lead vocals (2002–2010)
- Twan Eikelenboom – guitar (2002–2010)

== Discography ==
=== Albums ===
- Vanity (2009)
- Bright Companions (2012)
- The Great News (2015)
- FOUR (2023)

=== EPs ===
- Spring (online release) (2007)
- White Like The New Sky (2005)
- Unstached (2013)
- A House for Thee (2016)

=== Singles ===
- Vehicle (2009)
- Featherless Readheads (2012)
- Romans (2012)
- Dirt & Stones (2013)
- Heart Of A Traitor (2015)
- Broke Neck (2015)
- Son (2015)
- Relief (2016)
- Needles (2016)
- STEAM WALTZ (2023)
- SING and hope its out of tune (2023)
- The revenue was sick! (2023)
