= Malocchio (album) =

Studio album by Abandon All Ships
- Released: February 11, 2014
- Recorded: May 2013
- Genre: Electronicore; metalcore
- Length: 32:39
- Label: Rise; Velocity; Redfield; Universal Music Canada
- Producer: Anthony Calabretta

Abandon All Ships chronology
Infamous (2012)	Malocchio (2014)

Singles from Abandon All Ships
- 1. "Reefer Madness" Released: December 20, 2013; 2. "Cowboys" Released: January 24, 2014

Malocchio is the third and final studio album by Canadian electronicore band Abandon All Ships, released on February 11, 2014, via Rise, Velocity, and Universal Music Canada labels.

== Background ==
In September 2013, the band revealed that have been working on their third studio album. They released two studio updates during the development of the album, the first entitled, "Traces" was released on September 4, 2013, and the second, "Disposition" released on November 8, 2013. Vocalist Angelo Aita described the record as "a little bit heavier" than their previous albums. The album title Malocchio, is the Italian word for "evil eye" and according to Aita, he thought the concept behind it sounded "really cool." He also thought that the title fit well with the album's artwork. This is the band's first release with new drummer Melvin Murray and the second with guitarist Kyler Browne, who returned to the group in September 2013. Aita, Martin Broda, Sebastian Cassisi-Nunez and Anthony Calabretta wrote all tracks on the album, with some help from Browne.

The album was announced on December 20, 2013, set for release on February 11, 2014. That same day, the album's first single, "Reefer Madness" was released and showcases Sebastian Cassisi-Nunez incorporation of EDM. On January 24, 2014, the band released the second single from their forthcoming album, "Cowboys". On February 24, the group premiered the music video for "Trapped".

== Critical reception ==
Professional ratings
Review scores
Source	Rating
Sputnikmusic	2.4/5

Malocchio was met with mixed reviews from music critics. Davey Boy of Sputnikmusic gave a mixed review for the album stating, "Abandon All Ships have admirably continued to tinker with their formulaic brand of trancecore. That continues on Malocchio, and while the clubby style actually suits them, the results are pretty much the same, since the band rarely approach balancing all of the varying elements satisfyingly. They come closest on 'Trapped' and closer 'Paradise', but even then there is the nagging feeling that the choruses simply aren't infectious enough to make the tunes memorable."

Gregory Heaney of AllMusic remarked, "Malocchio, finds the band really embracing EDM... the band's fusion of dance music and metal is more fully realized, with the two elements not just mixing well, but playing off each other, effectively creating a kind of feedback loop that pushes the rowdiness of the band's sound to unknown territories. While their other work certainly had its moments, Malocchio feels like Abandon All Ships are finally coming into their own, and with any luck, the rest of the so-called electronicore scene will take note and follow suit."

== Commercial performance ==
Malocchio did not reach the Canadian Albums Chart or the Billboard 200, but peaked at number 23 on the US Top Hard Rock Albums chart and number 17 on the US Heatseekers Albums chart. It also reached number nine on the iTunes Rock chart.

== Track listing ==
All tracks are written by Angelo Aita, Martin Broda, Sebastian Cassisi-Nunez and Anthony Calabretta.

No.	Title	Length
1.	"Reefer Madness"	3:26
2.	"Trapped"	3:00
3.	"High Roller"	4:05
4.	"Bloor Street West"	3:10
5.	"Miracle"	3:11
6.	"Alive" (feat. Astrokrat)	3:09
7.	"Cowboys"	2:37
8.	"Malocchio"	3:35
9.	"Centipede"	2:44
10.	"Paradise"	3:44

== Personnel ==
Credits for Malocchio adapted from album's liner notes.

Abandon All Ships

- Angelo Aita – unclean vocals
- Martin Broda – clean vocals, bass guitar
- Kyler Browne – lead and rhythm guitar
- Sebastian Cassisi-Nunez – synthesizers, keyboards, programming, electronics
- Melvin Murray – drums, percussion

Personnel

- Anthony Calabretta – production, mixing, mastering, art direction, design, photography
- Thomas Gutches – management
- Dan Hand – management
- Adam Kreeft – booking
- Colin Lewis – booking
- Simon Paul – design, layout
- Dave Shapiro – booking
- Mark Spicoluk – production
- Marco Walzel – booking

== Charts ==
Chart performance for Malocchio
Chart (2014)	Peak position
US Top Hard Rock Albums (Billboard)	23
US Heatseekers Albums (Billboard)	17

== Release history ==
Release formats for Malocchio
Region	Date	Format(s)	Label	Ref.
Various	February 11, 2014	CD; digital download; streaming	Rise; Velocity; Universal Music Canada	
