= Seasons for Change =

Alternative rock band from Hongkong

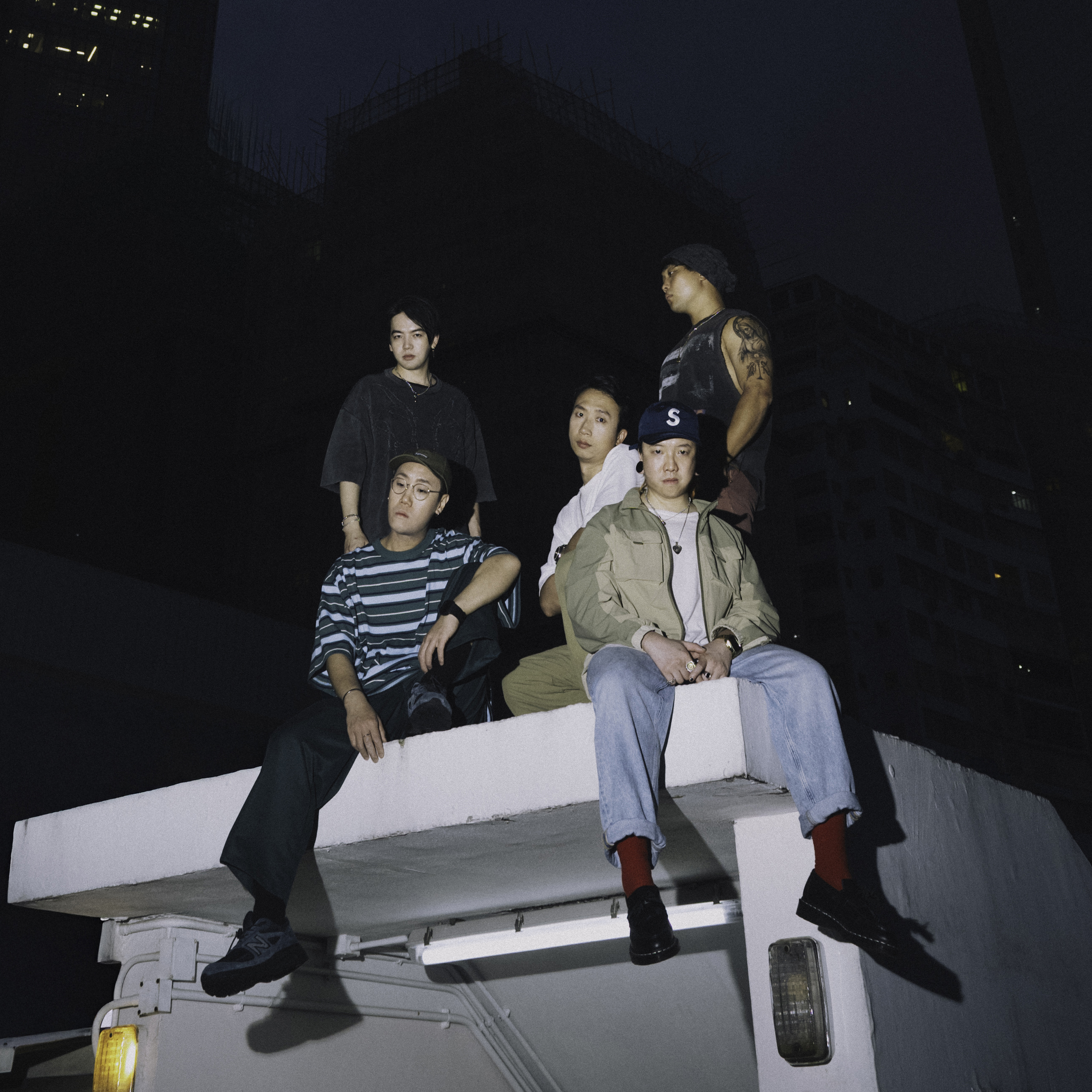

Background information
- Origin: Hong Kong
- Genres: Alternative rock, pop punk, emo, post-hardcore
- Years active: 2014–present
- Label: Famined Records (2016–2019)
- Members: KASA; Dennis Ho; Don Chan; Wannie Walker; Kulo Ming

Seasons for Change is a Hong Kong alternative rock band formed in 2014. The band consists of vocalist KASA, guitarists Dennis Ho and Don Chan, bassist Wannie Walker, and drummer Kulo Ming. Their music incorporates elements of pop punk, emo, and post-hardcore.

In 2018, the band won the Asia-Pacific regional championship of Vans' Musicians Wanted competition. In 2019, they released their debut full-length album Petals of Tomorrow, which was featured by British music magazine Kerrang!.

== Members ==
=== Current members ===
- Kenta Mitsuhashi – vocals (2014–present)
- Dennis Ho – guitar, backing vocals (2014–present)
- Don Chan – guitar (2015–present)
- Kulo Ming – drums (2014–present)
- Wannie Walker – bass (2014–present)

== History ==
Seasons for Change was formed in Spring 2014 in Hong Kong shortly after the return of vocalist Kenta Mitsuhashi who had studied in Australia. Mitsuhashi, who has Japanese and Filipinos roots works as a teacher at an elementary school. The band's line up consists of vocalist Mitsuhashi, bassist Wannie Walker, drummer Kulo Ming and guitarists Dennis Ho and Don Chan. In the year of the bands′ inception the musicians performed at Clockenflap for the first time.

In July 2016, the band signed a contract with American independent label Famined Records and released their debüt EP Timeless Collective later that year. In 2018 the band won the Asia-Pacific Division of Vans Musicians Wanted. The band released their first single of their debut album Petals of Tomorrow entitled Anchor in April 2019 while the album itself was released about two months later. One day prior the album's official release, British music magazine Kerrang! streamed the album in its entirely. Former Alazka vocalist Tobias Rische was guest musician on their song Erased.

During their musical career, Seasons for Change played numerous festivals in Singapore, Taiwan and PR China and shared stage with bands like Blessthefall and Our Last Night.

== Musical style ==
According to Kerrang!, Seasons for Change blend pop punk, metalcore, and emo with a hard rock approach. The band has also incorporated electronic elements into their arrangements to create atmosphere and texture.

== Discography ==
=== EPs ===
- Timeless Collective (2016)

=== Studio albums ===
- Petals of Tomorrow (2019)

=== Singles ===
- "Rain" (2015)
- "SKY" (2015)
- "Anchor" (2019)
- "Cherry Blossom" (2023)
- "Move On" (2023)
- "Surrounded by Stars" (2024)

== Awards ==
- 2018 – Vans Musicians Wanted, Asia-Pacific Regional Champion

== Side projects ==
In February 2021, vocalist Kenta Mitsuhashi started to release music as a solo musician under the name KASA. He is also a member of the band Soul of Ears.
