= Geeving =

Album by Abandon All Ships

Studio album by Abandon All Ships
- Released: October 5, 2010
- Studio: City Tape Studios, Toronto, ON; Royal Garage Studio, North Hollywood, CA
- Genre: Electronicore; post-hardcore; metalcore; hard trance; electropop
- Length: 33:11
- Label: Rise; Velocity; Redfield; Underground Operations; Universal Music Canada
- Producer: Mark Spicoluk

Abandon All Ships chronology
Abandon All Ships (2009)	Geeving (2010)	Infamous (2012)

Singles from Geeving
- 1. "Take One Last Breath" Released: June 29, 2010; 2. "Megawacko 2.0" Released: August 24, 2010

Geeving is the debut studio album by Canadian electronicore band Abandon All Ships. It was released on October 5, 2010, via Universal Music Canada, Underground Operations, Rise Records, and Velocity Records. The album peaked at number 27 on the Canadian Albums Chart, and number 16 on the Billboard Top Heatseekers chart. It is the only album to feature Daniel and Andrew Paiano, and is the group's only album recorded as a six-piece until their reformation in 2016.

== Background ==
In early 2010, the group signed with Underground Operations, Rise Records, and Velocity Records. They soon began writing their debut studio album. In May 2010, the group toured with Silverstein, Miss May I and The Devil Wears Prada. Following the tour, they began recording their album with engineer Anthony Cali and producer Mark Spicoluk. The album was mixed by the band's guitarist, Andrew Paiano. Three weeks into recording, they joined A Skylit Drive on the Go Fist Pump Your Self tour in the United States.

One of the first tracks written was "Take One Last Breath", originally under the title, "Pedestrians Is Another Word For Speedbump", which was featured on their debut self-titled EP released in 2009. According to vocalist Angelo Aita, they re-recorded the song removing the outro breakdown and adding another chorus. They also renamed the song because the labels wanted a shorter title. The album title, Geeving, is taken from its Urban Dictionary definition, "Couldn't care less. Don't give a shit. Leave me alone. Fuck off."

== Release ==
The album's lead single, "Take One Last Breath", was released on June 29, 2010, for digital download. It managed to peak at number 5 on the Canadian Rock Charts and number 65 on the Canadian Pop Charts. A music video directed by Davin Black premiered on MTV's Headbangers Ball on August 24, 2010, and VH1 on August 27. The album's second single, "Megawacko 2.1", was released on August 24, 2010 for digital download, whilst the music video premiered on MuchMusic the same day. A B-side from the album, "Maria (I Like It Loud)", was available for free download online. On September 10, the group released the song "Bro My God" for streaming via MySpace. On October 5, MuchMusic premiered Geeving for online streaming, before it was released in stores on October 12. On December 17, the music video for "Geeving" was released, and the song won Best Rock Video at the 2011 MuchMusic Video Awards.

== Critical reception ==
Professional ratings
Review scores
Source	Rating
AbsolutePunk	39%
Alter the Press!	2/5 stars
Ultimate Guitar Archive	(6.7/10)

Geeving was met with mixed reviews from music critics. AbsolutePunk gave a negative review for the album calling it, "disappointing" and criticized Angelo Aita's scream vocals as "dull, flat, and boring," and Martin Broda's autotuned vocals as "lifeless." However, they praised the single "Take One Last Breath" as the album's only standout track. Sean Reid of Alter the Press! also gave a negative review remarking, "Geeving traps itself by falling into occasional cliches that are all too familiar within the electo-hardcore genre." He noted how the album "doesn't offer much in terms of variation," but praised the band's heavy side that "give them creditability." Ultimate Guitar gave the album a positive review stating, "You'll be sold or repulsed fairly quickly when listening to the first few moments of Geeving... There is certainly a sense of creativity in the band's endeavor, but the excessive autotuning also feels like they are following fads. Geeving has its moments, but the negatives tend to overshadow the positives in this case."

== Track listing ==
All tracks are written by Abandon All Ships.

No.	Title	Length
1.	"Bro My God"	2:34
2.	"Geeving" (featuring Jhevon Paris)	3:36
3.	"Megawacko2.1"	3:52
4.	"When Dreams Become Nightmares"	3:51
5.	"Strange Love"	1:07
6.	"Family Goretrait" (featuring Rody Walker of Protest the Hero)	3:14
7.	"Guardian Angel" (featuring Lena Katina)	4:10
8.	"Structures"	3:36
9.	"Heaven"	3:30
10.	"Take One Last Breath"	3:40
Total length:		33:11

== Personnel ==
Credits for Geeving adapted from AllMusic.

=== Musicians ===
Abandon All Ships

- Angelo Aita – unclean vocals, composer
- Martin Broda – clean vocals, bass guitar, composer
- Kyler Stephen Browne – lead guitar
- Andrew Paiano – rhythm guitar, bass guitar, drums, composer
- Sebastian Cassisi-Nunez – synthesizers, keyboards, programming and composer
- Daniel Paiano – drums, percussion, composer

Guest musicians

- Jhevon Paris – guest vocals on track 2
- Rody Walker – guest vocals on track 6
- Lena Katina – guest vocals on track 7

=== Production ===
- Boris Renski – production
- Anthony Calabretta – production, engineering, mixing
- Mark Spicoluk – composer, production
- João Carvalho – mastering
- Sven Martin – engineering
- Zachary Ramsey – photography
- Andrew Paiano – mixing

== Charts ==
Chart performance for Geeving
Chart (2010)	Peak position
Canadian Albums (Billboard)	27
US Heatseekers Albums (Billboard)	16

== Release history ==
Release formats for Geeving
Region	Date	Format(s)	Label	Catalog number	Ref.
Canada	October 5, 2010	Digital download	Universal Music Canada	—N/a	
United States	October 5, 2010	CD; digital download	Velocity Records	B003Z9Q4TE	
Europe	October 6, 2010	CD	Rise Records	AAS0DL0100-DL00	
Canada	October 12, 2010	CD	Universal Music Canada; Underground Operations	B0041O9AUC	
