= Backe, backe Kuchen =

German children's rhyme

"Backe, backe Kuchen" is a German-language children's rhyme. It originated in Saxony and Thuringia with several textual versions from 1840.

== Text and melody ==
Backe, backe Kuchen,
der Bäcker hat gerufen.
Wer will guten Kuchen backen,
der muss haben sieben Sachen:
Eier und Schmalz,
Zucker und Salz,
Milch und Mehl,
Safran macht den Kuchen gehl.
Schieb, schieb in'n Ofen 'nein.

Translation:

Bake a cake, bake a cake,
the baker has called.
Whoever wants to bake a good cake,
must have seven things:
eggs and lard,
sugar and salt,
milk and flour,
Saffron makes the cake yellow.
Push it into the oven.

The melody musically structures the text in the way of bar form. The framing lines follow a conventional four-bar period, where only the melodic variation in the postscript of the reprise (i.e. in the last two bars) enlivens the otherwise rather monotonous course. However, the symmetry of these run counter to the bars of the sung "middle part". This irregularity is common in folk songs when litany-like prose texts are set to music. Familiar songs that use this effect are significantly stronger than that with a relatively simple three-bar song, examples like "Backe, backe Kuchen" include "Der Bauer schickt den Jockel aus" or the Christmas carol "The Twelve Days of Christmas".

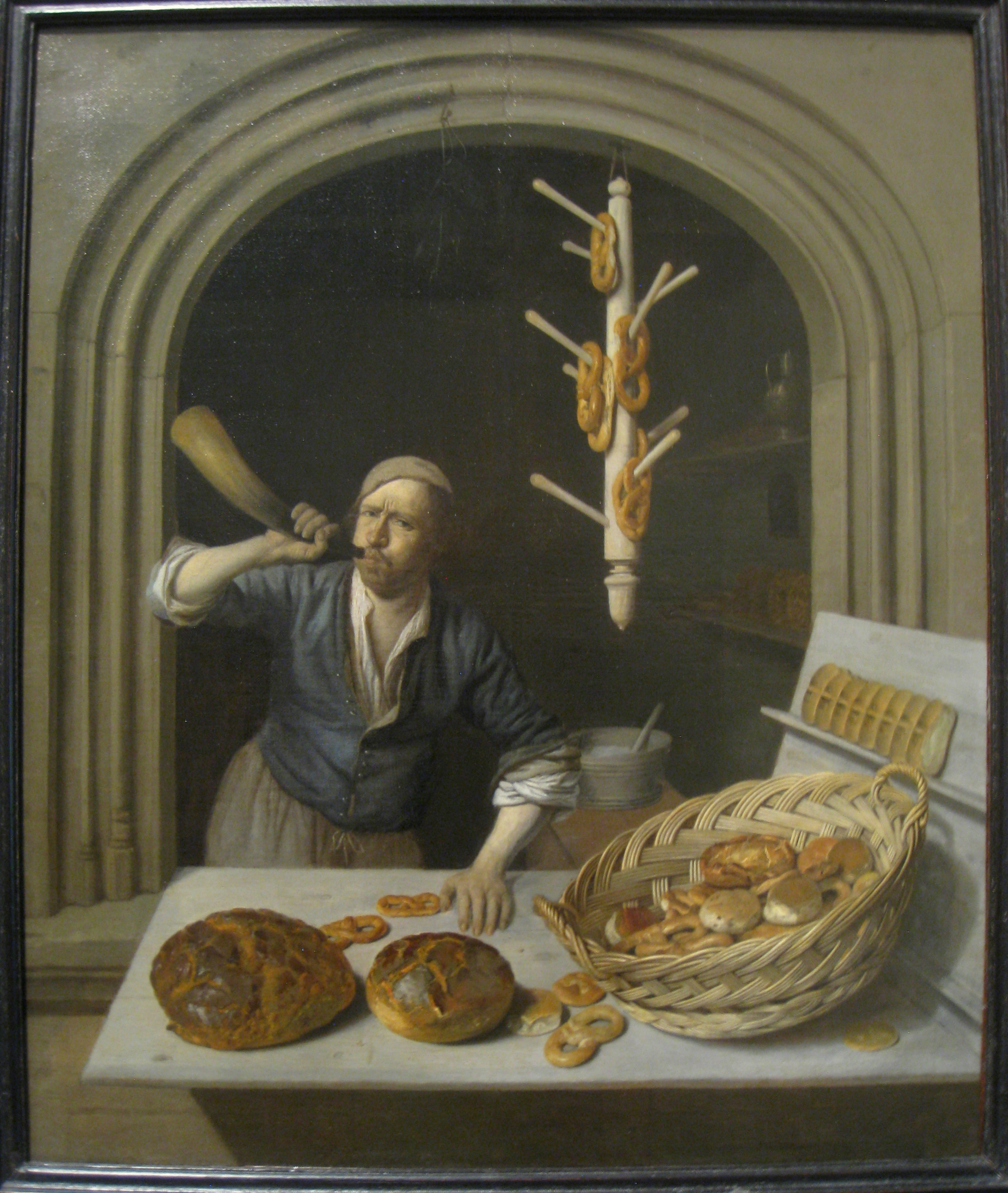
Baker, blowing a horn (c.1681, J. A. Berckheyde

The song describes a common practice in earlier times: bakers, after baking bread, called with a horn to signal to the women of the neighbourhood that the residual heat of the oven could now be used to bake the women's own cakes. Similarly, where bread was baked in the common village oven, there was a signal when the bread was removed and the residual heat of the oven could be used for baking cakes.

== Cultural references ==
- A 2004 episode of the German TV series Berlin, Berlin was titled after the song.
- Das Monster aus dem Schrank, debut album by German deathcore duo We Butter the Bread with Butter, has a track "Backe, backe Kuchen".

== See also ==
- Pat-a-cake, pat-a-cake, baker's man, an English equivalent
