= Floya =

German rock duo

FLOYA
- Origin: Recklinghausen, North Rhine-Westphalia, Germany
- Genres: pop rock; world
- Years active: 2022–present
- Labels: Arising Empire
- Members: Philipp Bayer; Marvin Bruckwilder

FLOYA (stylized in all caps) is a German pop rock and world music duo formed in 2022 in Recklinghausen, North Rhine-Westphalia. The duo consists of singer Philipp Bayer and guitarist Marvin Bruckwilder.

== History ==
The music duo was formed in 2022 with singer and former Time, The Valuator frontman Phil Bayer and ex-ALAZKA guitarist Marv Wilder, both of whom had experience in the music industry and had their start in the German metal scene. Phil left the music industry in 2018 only to return four years later as the singer for FLOYA. In March, the duo released their first single titled "Wonders" in which the musicians described as uplifting and positive. Within that time period, they signed with German record label Arising Empire. In May, two months down the road, FLOYA released yet another single titled "The Hymn" and Bayer stated that the song was about compromise and letting go, but also about making peace with such concepts. A month later, FLOYA dropped another song called "Epiphany" in which Bayer described as the kind of song that invites people to look inwards and to self reflect. In October of the same year, the duo released their second EP titled Florescent which consisted of five songs. They also released a music video for the song titled as the namesake album "Florescent" in which was recorded and produced by Chris Kempe of Embark Audio, and mastered by Robin Schmidt of 24-96 Mastering. In 2024, FLOYA released their debut album, Yume, consisting of ten tracks and dropped a music video for one of the songs, titled "Drift".

== Style ==
The duo use electro dance music elements and implement world music into their songs. They also provide lush and nostalgic synths into their sounds using bouncing rhythms and exquisite vocals.

== Band members ==
- Philipp Bayer - Vocals
- Marvin Bruckwilder - Guitar

== Discography ==
Album

- Yume (2024)

EPs

- Weaver (2022)
- Florescent (2022)
- Willows (2023)

Music Videos

- Wonders
- The Hymn
- Epiphany
- Weaver
- Florescent
- Willows
- Stay
- Drift
- Lights Out
- Yume
