= The Sequins =

British pop band

The Sequins are an indie-pop band from Coventry, England that formed in 2002 when vocalist Hywel Roberts and guitarist Justin Hui performed a version of Talking Heads' "Psycho Killer" on the ukulele at the University of Warwick in 2002. Roberts and Hui were joined by Rob Hinchliff, Karthic Kukathasan and Simon Vint.

== Tough Love Records ==
Brendan Casey replaced Vint in 2004, and the following year the band joined Coventry-based label Tough Love Records. Their first single, 'Nobody Dreams About Me', in 2005 became the very first release on Tough Love Records and was a double CD and vinyl format. It was followed up in 2006 by 'Patients'. Karthic Kukuthasan left the band shortly afterwards and was replaced by Steve Weird.

They released their debut album The Death of Style in November 2007, the first full-length album to be released on Tough Love Records to largely positive critical acclaim.

== Post Tough Love ==
In early 2008, both Brendan Casey and Rob Hinchliff left the band, and Donna Crawford, a former member of Rugby-based punk rockers Any Given Day joined to play drums. At around the same time, Tough Love Records relocated to London, and it became clear that Death of Style would be the band's last release on the label.

The new four-piece line up began to record music at home after some bad experiences in commercial recording studios, and an EP called 'Risky Woods' was scheduled for release by London-based label Indie-MP3 in Spring 2010.

== Discography ==
=== Albums ===
- The Death of Style (2007)
- Where are you going (2016)

=== Singles ===
- "Nobody Dreams About Me" (2005)
- "Patients" (2006)
- Risky Woods EP (2010)
- "Japan / Alive" (2010)
