= Abandon All Ships =

Canadian metalcore band

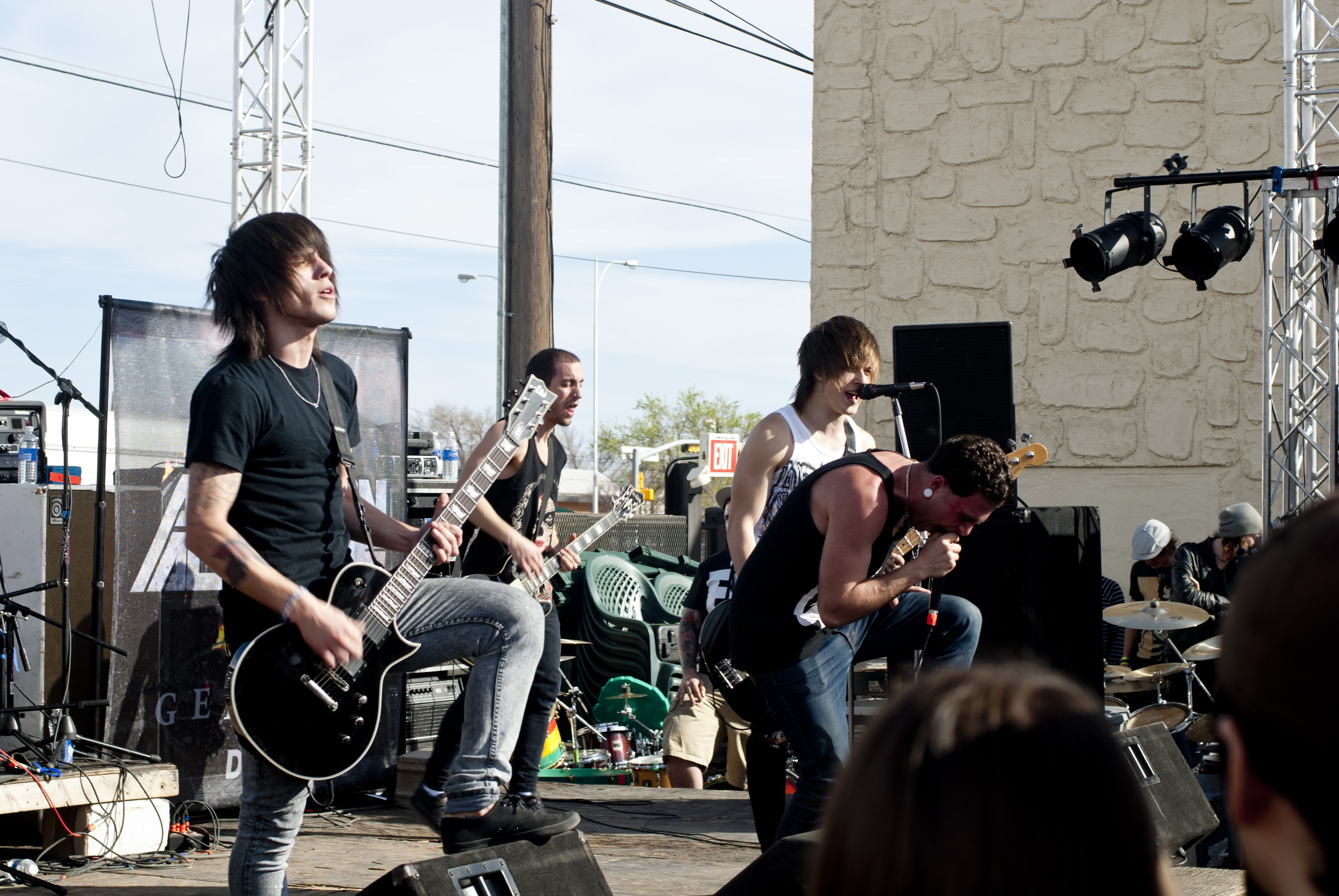
- Abandon All Ships live at the Cactus Courtyard venue in Lubbock, Texas (2011)

Background information
- Origin: Toronto, Ontario, Canada
- Genres: Metalcore; post-hardcore; electronicore
- Years active: 2006–2014; 2016–2020
- Labels: Universal Canada; Underground Operations; Rise; Velocity; Redfield
- Past members: Angelo Aita; Sebastian Cassisi-Nunez; Martin Broda; Daniel Ciccotelli; Andrew Paiano; Daniel Paiano; Francesco Pallotta; David Stephens; Nick Fiorini; Chris Taylor; Kyler Browne; Melvin Murray

Abandon All Ships was a Canadian post-hardcore band from Toronto, Ontario. Formed in 2006, it was signed domestically to Universal Music Canada via Underground Operations, along with an American deal to Rise Records and its imprint Velocity Records.

== History ==
=== Formation and self-titled debut EP (2006–2009) ===
Abandon All Ships was founded in 2006 in Toronto, Ontario, originally playing covers of Norma Jean songs. The band started when the members were in 8th grade doing screamo and pop punk. Most of the band members attended Dante Alighieri Academy, including lead vocalist Angelo Aita, keyboardist Sebastian Cassisi-Nunez, and original guitarist David Stephens; Toronto friends Martin Broda and Francesco Pallotta were added on bass and drums respectively. In 2007, Nick Fiorini was added on rhythm guitar.

By 2008, the band had released four demo songs online: "Megawacko", "When Dreams Become Nightmares", "Brendon's Song" and "Pedestrians Is Another Word for Speedbump". After rising in the Toronto scene, the group toured and opened for many larger bands in their same genre, such as Blessed by a Broken Heart and Silverstein. By the end of 2008, Nick Fiorini had been replaced by Andrew Paiano. They were given even more exposure after their appearance on the MuchMusic's Canadian television program Disband and began playing shows outside of Ontario. The band released their self-titled EP on February 24, 2009. In 2009, the band embarked on the Drop Your Pants and Dance tour with support from These Silhouettes and Hometown Beatdown.

Because Christian themes appeared in the band's earlier material, some thought that Abandon All Ships was a Christian band, but it was not; its regular use of profanity and suggestive lyrics eventually settled the debate.

=== Geeving (2009–2010) ===
At the end of 2009, David Stephens and Francesco Pallotta left the band; they were replaced by Kyler Browne on lead guitar and, on drums, Daniel Paiano (Andrew's brother). In early 2010, the group was signed to Underground Operations, Rise Records, and Velocity Records. In January 2010, the band performed at the Tattoo Rock Parlour in Brampton, along with other Disband groups including These Kids Wear Crowns. Around this time, they started writing their debut studio album, before embarking on the Snocore Tour, alongside Protest the Hero, Hawthorne Heights, Elias in March 2010. They performed at the Canadian Music Week festival in Toronto on March 10. In May 2010, the group toured with Silverstein, Miss May I and The Devil Wears Prada. Following the tour, they began recording their album with engineer Anthony Cali and it was produced by Mark Spicoluk. The album was mixed by the band's guitarist, Andrew Paiano. Three weeks into recording, they joined A Skylit Drive on the Go Fist Pump Your Self tour in the United States. On June 29, 2010, they released their first single, "Take One Last Breath"; the music video premiered on MuchMusic the following day. The song peaked at number five on the Canadian rock music charts. They played at the 2010 Bluesfest in Ottawa, performing new songs "Geeving", "Guardian Angel" (which features Lena Katina from the Russian band t.A.T.u.), "Maria (I Like It Loud)", and "Take One Last Breath", all of which were to appear on the up-coming album, Geeving. The name of the album is taken from its Urban Dictionary definition, "Couldn't care less. Don't give a shit. Leave me alone. Fuck off."

The single "Megawacko 2.0" was released on iTunes on August 24, 2010, with the video premiering on MuchMusic that same day. From August to September 2010, the band toured with We Came As Romans. In September, "Bro My God" also premiered via online streaming. On October 5, MuchMusic premiered Geeving for online streaming, before it was released physically on October 12. The album peaked at number 27 on the Canadian Albums Chart and number 16 on the US Heatseekers Albums chart. The group embarked on the headlining Geeving Across Canada tour in October 2010. Abandon All Ships was then included on the Monument tour from October 29, 2010, to December 5, 2010, with Miss May I, Sleeping with Sirens, The Crimson Armada, and Bury Tomorrow. On December 17, the music video for "Geeving" was released, and the song won Best Rock Video at the 2011 MuchMusic Video Awards.

=== Lineup instability, Infamous (2011–2013) ===
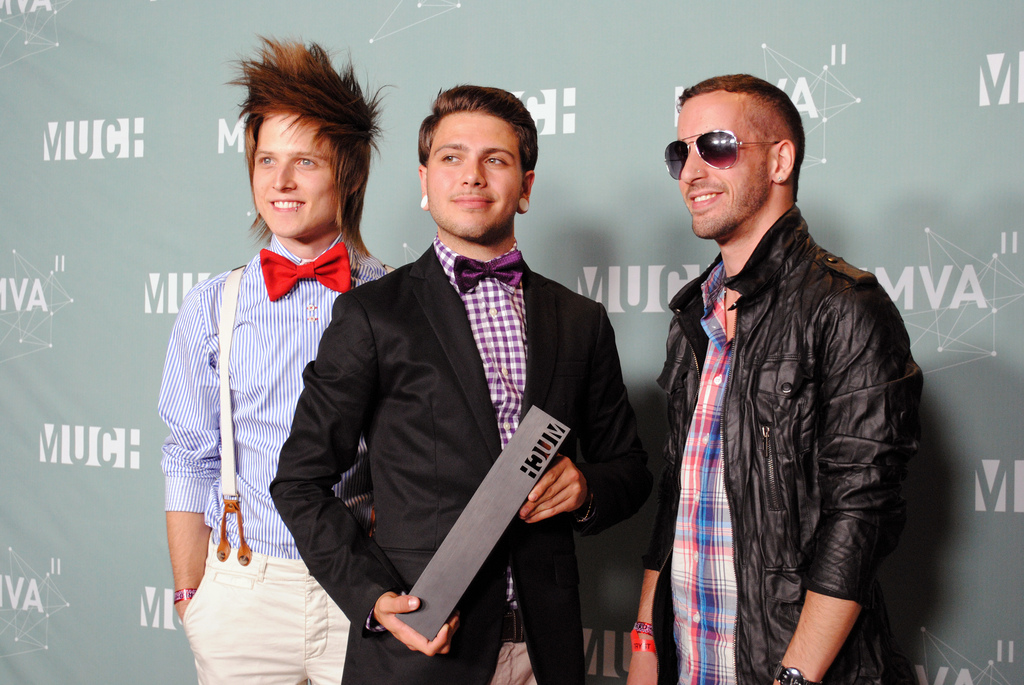
Members Martin Broda, Angelo Aita and Daniel Ciccotelli at the 2011 MuchMusic Video Awards.

The band joined Close Your Eyes, I See Stars and Us From Outside on a United States tour in January 2011. On January 24, 2011, lead guitarist Kyler Browne left the band and was replaced by Daniel Ciccotelli. Abandon All Ships participated in the 2011 Vans Warped Tour for selected dates on the east leg. On July 14, 2011, the Paiano brothers, Andrew (rhythm guitar) and Daniel (drums), left the band. In August 2011, the group performed at Celebration Square as part of the Amphitheatre Unplugged series along with San Sebastian.

On January 18, 2012, the band announced that they were in the process of recording their second studio album. The title was announced as Infamous, and it was released on July 3, 2012. The video for its title track was released on the first of May with its environment and direction being described as "very Toronto". The group joined Secrets, Sleeping with Sirens and Conditions on tour in March 2012. The album peaked at number 54 on the Canadian Albums Chart. The album also debuted at number 142 on the Billboard 200, selling over 3,500 copies in its first week.

In September 2012, the band supported We Came as Romans on a Canadian headlining tour alongside Skip the Foreplay and Ice Nine Kills. On November 14, the band premiered the music video for "August". On November 29, the band was announced as support for For the Fallen Dreams European/UK tour beginning in March alongside fellow supporting acts Dream On, Dreamer, and No Bragging Rights. On December 14, drummer Chris Taylor left the band. The group along with Dance Gavin Dance supported Hollywood Undead on tour in March 2013. They released a music video for "Less Than Love" in June 2013.

=== Malocchio and breakup (2013–2014) ===
In September 2013, the band revealed that they have been working on their third studio album. Aita described the record as "a little bit heavier" than their previous albums. They announced the album title Malocchio on December 20, 2013, which was released on February 11, 2014. Along with the announcement, the band streamed the album's first single, "Reefer Madness" on YouTube. The album title is the Italian word for "evil eye" and according to Aita, he thought the concept behind it sounded "really cool." He also thought that the title fit well with the album's artwork. During the writing and recording of the album, Browne returned to the group and helped write songs for the record. On January 25, 2014, the band released the second single, "Cowboys". The group embarked on a headlining tour in February and March 2014, in support of the album. On February 24, the group premiered the music video for "Trapped". The album did not reach the Canadian Albums Chart or the Billboard 200, but peaked at number nine on the iTunes Rock chart.

On August 5, 2014, the band was announced to go on a short tour with Dance Gavin Dance and Stolas beginning at the end of August and on the 15th of that same month, guitarist Daniel Ciccotelli left the band.

Abandon All Ships announced its breakup on August 15, 2014, and played their last show on September 25 in Toronto with current and past members. Some members went on to form a new band, Sine of the Lion. Martin Broda started a new band, Cherry Pools.

=== Reformation and sporadic releases (2016–2020) ===
In February 2016, the band announced that they will be reuniting their original lineup for an anniversary show for their debut studio album, Geeving on March 18, in Toronto. The group also released a new single titled "Loafting", which features the band's original line-up, except for Kyler Browne, and with the addition of Daniel Ciccotelli. The track features mixing from Andrew Paiano.

On October 30, 2020, the band officially released their cover of Scooter's song "Maria (I Like It Loud)" on streaming services, 10 years after its unofficial release alongside Geeving. On November 3, the band released their cover of Drake's "We'll Be Fine" on streaming services. "We'll Be Fine" was a 9-year-old cover but hadn't been released on streaming services prior.

== Musical style ==
The band's third album incorporates elements from their first and second albums, plus new elements as keyboardist Sebastian Cassisi-Nunez brought in more of an EDM influence. Allmusic's Gregory Heaney described the group as "an electronicore band who fused crabcore with EDM" besides stating that they "combine elements of electronic music and post-hardcore and technical metal into a strangely triumphant hybrid. The band cites Metallica, Anthrax, Pantera, Alice in Chains, Avenged Sevenfold, Linkin Park, Slipknot, Lamb of God, Benny Benassi, Gigi D'Agostino, Hardwell, Tiësto, deadmau5, Lordz of Brooklyn and Beastie Boys as influences.

== Band members ==
Final lineup

- Angelo Aita – unclean vocals (2006–2014, 2016)
- Sebastian Cassisi-Nunez – keyboards, programming, electronics (2006–2014, 2016)
- Daniel Paiano – drums (2009–2011, 2016)
- Andrew Paiano – rhythm guitar (2008–2011, 2016)
- Martin Broda – clean vocals (2006–2014, 2016), bass guitar (2009–2014, 2016), drums (2006–2009)
- Daniel Ciccotelli – lead guitar (2011–2013, 2016)

Former

- David Stephens – lead guitar (2006–2009)
- Francesco Pallotta – bass guitar (2006–2009)
- Nick Fiorini – rhythm guitar (2007–2008)
- Chris Taylor – drums (2011–2013)
- Kyler Browne – lead guitar (2009–2011, 2013–2014)
- Melvin Murray – drums (2013–2014)

Timeline

== Discography ==
Abandon All Ships discography
- Studio albums: 3
- Extended plays: 1
- Singles: 8

=== Studio albums ===
List of studio albums, with selected chart positions and sales figures
Title	Album details	Peak chart positions				Sales
Title	Album details	CAN	US	US Heat	US Rock	Sales
Geeving	Released: October 5, 2010; Label: Universal Music Canada; Formats: CD, digital download	27	—	16	—	
Infamous	Released: July 3, 2012; Label: Universal Music Canada; Format: Compact disc, digital download	54	142	3	50	US: 3,500
Malocchio	Released: February 11, 2014; Label: Universal Music Canada; Format: Compact disc, digital download	—	—	17	—	
"—" denotes a recording that did not chart or was not released in that territory.

=== Extended plays ===
List of extended plays with selected details
Title	EP details
Abandon All Ships	Released: February 24, 2009; Label: Self-released; Format: Compact disc, digital download

=== Singles ===
List of singles as lead artist, with selected chart positions, showing year released and album name
Title	Year	Peak chart positions		Album
Title	Year	CAN Rock	CAN Pop	Album
"Take One Last Breath"	2010	5	65	Geeving
"Megawacko 2.0"	2010	—	—	Geeving
"Infamous"	2012	—	—	Infamous
"Reefer Madness"	2013	—	—	Malocchio
"Cowboys"	2014	—	—	Malocchio
"Loafting"	2016	—	—	Non-album singles
"Maria (I Like It Loud)"	2020	—	—	Non-album singles
"We'll Be Fine"	2020	—	—	Non-album singles
"—" denotes releases that did not chart.

=== Promotional singles ===
List of promotional singles
Title	Year	Album
"Bro My God"	2010	Geeving
"Good Old Friend"	2012	Infamous

=== Music videos ===
Title	Year	Director(s)	Ref.
"Take One Last Breath"	2010	Davin Black	
"Megawacko 2.1"	2010	Davin Black	
"Geeving"	2010	Davin Black	
"Infamous"	2012	Michael Nardi	
"August"	2012	Michael Nardi	
"Less Than Love"	2013	—N/a	
"Trapped"	2014	Indiescope	
"Loafting"	2016	Andrew Paiano	
