= Goldkinder =

2013 studio album by We Butter the Bread with Butter

Studio album by We Butter the Bread with Butter
- Released: 9 August 2013 (Europe); 13 August 2013 (US)
- Recorded: 2012–2013
- Genre: Metalcore; electronicore; industrial metal
- Length: 51:03
- Label: Visible Noise, Relativity

We Butter the Bread with Butter chronology
Der Tag an dem die Welt unterging (2010)	Goldkinder (2013)	Wieder geil! (2015)

Singles from Goldkinder
- 1. "Pyroman & Astronaut" Released: 17 May 2013; 2. "Das Uhrwerk" Released: 18 June 2013; 3. "Alles Was Ich Will" Released: 10 July 2013

Professional ratings
Review scores
Source	Rating
Impericon	4.5/6 stars
Metal Hammer	5/7

Goldkinder (German for "gold children") is the third studio album by German deathcore band We Butter the Bread with Butter. It was released on 9 August 2013. The album entered the German Media Control chart at No. 27.

Their first single Pyroman & Astronaut hit #16 at German MetalRock Charts.

The song Meine Brille appeared in the BBC Radio 1 playlist. It is the first appearance of WBTBWB in the BBC Radio.

== Track listing ==
No.	Title	English translation (unofficial)	Length
1.	"Alles was ich will"	All I Want	3:49
2.	"Meine Brille"	My Glasses	3:38
3.	"Pyroman & Astronaut"		4:07
4.	"Ohne Herz"	Without Heart	3:15
5.	"Super heiß ins Trommelfell (S.H.I.T.)"	Super Hot in the Eardrum	3:28
6.	"Viva Mariposa"	Live, Butterfly	5:05
7.	"Fall"		3:37
8.	"Mayday Mayday"		3:21
9.	"Makellos"	Flawless	4:03
10.	"Das Uhrwerk"	The Clockwork	4:04
11.	"Krieg aus Gold"	War from Gold	3:55
12.	"Psycho"		3:59
13.	"Kind im Brunnen"	Child in the Well	4:49
Total length:			51:03

iTunes bonus tracks
No.	Title	Length
14.	"Makellos (Weiss Schnur Remix)"	4:40
15.	"Super heiß ins Trommelfell (S.H.I.T.) (Dublyme Remix)"	4:00
Total length:		59:43

Deluxe edition bonus tracks
No.	Title	Length
16.	"Meine Brille (Dublyme Remix)"	5:36
17.	"Alles was ich will (Weiss Schnur Remix)"	4:14
18.	"Alles was ich will (Instrumental)"	3:49
19.	"Meine Brille (Instrumental)"	3:38
20.	"Das Uhrwerk (Instrumental)"	4:05
21.	"Viva Mariposa (Instrumental)"	5:01
Total length:		26:24

== Personnel ==
- Paul "Борщ" Bartzsch – lead vocals
- Marcel "Marci" Neumann – guitars, keyboards, programming
- Maximilian Pauly Saux – bass
- Can Özgünsür – drums, keyboards

== Chart performance ==
Chart (2013)	Peak position
German Album Charts	27
Austria Album Tops	70
