= Take One Last Breath =

Single by Abandon All Ships

from the album Geeving
- Released: June 29, 2010
- Genre: Electronicore
- Length: 3:46
- Label: Universal Music Canada
- Songwriter(s): Anthony Calabretta; Sebastiano Guiseppe Cassisi Nunez; Mark Spicoluk; Angelo Aita; Martin Broda; Daniel Paiano
- Producer(s): Mark Spicoluk

Abandon All Ships singles chronology
| "Take One Last Breath" (2010) | "Megawacko 2.0" (2010) |

Music video
- "Take One Last Breath" on YouTube

"Take One Last Breath" (formerly known as "Pedestrians Is Another Word for Speedbump") is a song by Canadian metalcore band Abandon All Ships. It was released as the first single from their debut album, Geeving. The single was released on iTunes on June 29, 2010, followed by the music video being released on June 30, where it premiered on MuchMusic.

== Background ==
At that time of release for their self-titled EP, "Take One Last Breath" was titled "Pedestrians Is Another Word for Speedbump". Angelo Aita explained that the song name was changed because the band "changed the song completely...so it's like a new name for a new song" and that Universal Music Canada, "wanted [Abandon All Ships] to shorten [the song title] because it was really long."

The song was featured on Warped Tour's 2011 compilation album.

== Composition ==
The song was written by the group prior to the release of their self-titled EP and was the second song they wrote. The track was produced by Mark Spicoluk who also produced their debut studio album, Geeving.

The differences between "Take One Last Breath" and "Pedestrians Is Another Word for Speedbump" are minor. A main difference is that "Take One Last Breath" is longer by 21 seconds, and does not include the synth patches from "Pedestrians" during the breakdown. The middle part of the song where is says "captain captain, before the sail rips" repeats three times in "Pedestrians", yet is said only twice in "Take One Last Breath", first "captain captain, before the sail rips", then "captain captain, I can see enemy ships" before repeating the first term. Lastly, "Pedestrians" does not repeat the chorus at the end, but simply ends with the breakdown.

== Music video ==
The music video premiered on MuchMusic on June 30, 2010, following their appearance on disBand. The video also aired on VH1 on August 27, and MTV's Headbangers Ball on August 24.

The music video for the song was directed by Davin Black of 235films, and is a performance-only style music video. It primarily features the band performing either on the ground, or on higher platforms with their instruments. A behind-the-scenes video was posted to Abandon All Ships' YouTube page on July 5, 2010, showing a dispute about lasers that were apparently supposed to be in the video.

== Track listing ==
Digital download
| No. | Title | Length |
|---|---|---|
| 1. | "Take One Last Breath" (video version) | 3:39 |
| 2. | "Take One Last Breath" (album version) | 3:45 |

== Charts ==
Chart performance for "Take One Last Breath"
| Chart (2010) | Peak position |
|---|---|
| Canada Pop (Billboard) | 65 |
| Canada Rock (Billboard) | 5 |

== Release history ==
Release history for "Take One Last Breath"
| Region | Date | Format | Label | Ref. |
|---|---|---|---|---|
| Various | June 29, 2010 | Digital download | Universal Music Canada | |
