= His Statue Falls =

German band

- Origin: Saarbrücken, Germany
- Genres: Electronicore, metalcore, post-hardcore
- Years active: 2003–2016
- Labels: Redfield, Radtone
- Members: Dennis Fries
- Past members: Maximilian Schütz; Alex Sauer; Thomas Theis; Christoph Hoffmann; Christian Diehl; Jan Vergin; Markus Pesch; Seb "Uncil" Monzel; Michael Kaczmarczyk
- Website: hisstatuefalls.com

His Statue Falls was a German post hardcore band formed in 2003 in Saarbrücken, Germany.

== History ==
His Statue Falls was formed in 2003 in Saarbrücken. The musicians played in different bands like Crash My DeVille and Enter The Phoenix and were friends since school-time. The band was formed as a studio project. In 2007 the group released its first demo CD consisting of two tracks. The group played their first gigs in 2008. After some lineup changes, the band's current lineup was formed.

In 2009 the band played four shows as opener for Enter Shikari in Germany, Belgium, Luxembourg and the Netherlands. The message to play together with Enter Shikari the band got at their MySpace profile. On February 26, 2010 the debut album Collisions was released via German record label Redfield Records. It was produced by the band's bassist Christian Diehl. In June the same year, the album was released in Japan via Radtone Music. In December the band released Collisions Remixed which contains 8 remixed songs from their debut album as a free download on their Webstore. The band planned a concert tour through Russia and Ukraine in October 2010 but the shows had to be rescheduled due to the injury of their drummer Maximilian Schütz.

The second album which is entitled Mistaken for Trophies was scheduled for release on September 23, 2011, but it was postponed to April 20, 2012. In February 2012 the first single was released. It's entitled Breathe In, Breathe Out and features Chuong Trinh of Hordak as guest vocalist. The album peaked on place 19 in the newcomer charts of Media Control in Germany. On May 9, 2012, the album was released in Japan via Radtone.

Due to familiar reasons drummer, Maximilian Schütz left the band and was replaced by Markus Pesch who joined the band in May. In July His Statue Falls toured Japan for the first time. The band played in Osaka, Nagoya and Tokyo while the Geki Rock Tour. After Geki Rock His Statue Falls played six shows in China including Shenzhen, Beijing, Shanghai, Wuhan, Nanjing and Guangzhou.

On November 11, 2015, the band announced their third studio album with the title "Polar" which was released on March 4, 2016. With that announcement, they released a new single titled "Hang Me High". In the meanwhile, they also changed their bassist, Christian, one of the former members, who was replaced by Michael Kaczmarczyk, because of lack of time for the band and job-related reasons. The band never made it official but posted it in the comment section when a fan asked. On May 25, 2016, the band announced that Jan, Markus, Sebastian & Michael left His Statue Falls, leaving guitarist Dennis Fries as not only the group's last remaining original member but also the band's only member.

Although no official announcement has been made, the "Permanently closed" on the band's Facebook page indicates that they have ended activities altogether.

== Members ==
Final lineup

- Dennis Fries – clean vocals, guitar (2003–2016)

Other members

- Markus Pesch – drums (2012–May 2016)
- Jan Vergin – unclean vocals (2013–May 2016)
- Sebastian Monzel – guitar, synthesizer (2013–May 2016)
- Michael Kaczmarczyk – bass (2015–May 2016)
- Christian Diehl – bass, synthesizer (2003–2015)
- Alex Sauer – unclean vocals (2003–2012)
- Maximilian Schütz – drums (2003–2012)
- Christoph Hoffmann – synthesizer, guitar (2003–2013)
- Thomas Theis – keyboards (2003–2010)

Touring musicians

- Manuel Eckert (Hollows, formerly of Of Saints and Sinners) – vocals
- Tilo Schachel (Arterial) – vocals
- Daniel Keller (Palmchat) – guitar
- Patrick Oscuri (From What We Believe) – drums

Timeline

== Discography ==
=== Studio albums ===
- 2010: Collisions (Redfield Records, Radtone Music)
- 2012: Mistaken for Trophies (Redfield Records, Radtone Music)
- 2016: Polar (Redfield Records, Go with Me)

=== Remix albums ===
- 2010: Collisions Remixed (Redfield Records)

=== EPs ===
- 2013: I Am the Architect (Redfield Records, Radtone Music)

=== Demos ===
- 2007: Demo (self-released)

== Music videos ==
- Capital H Capital O
- Breathe In, Breathe Out (feat. Chuong Trinh)
- I Am the Architect
- Break Free
- The Virus
