= A-Game =

Canadian hip hop duo

- Also known as: Nova and Chase
- Origin: Toronto, Ontario, Canada
- Genres: Hip hop, R&B, electronic
- Years active: 2007-present
- Labels: PilotModeMuzik; T.A.G. (The Armada Group)
- Members: Rommel Hinds-Grannun; Robert Hinds-Grannun

A-Game is a hip-hop duo from Toronto, Ontario, made up of identical twins, Rommel Hinds-Grannun and Robert Hinds-Grannun, who also go by the stage name Nova and Chase.

The duo began their career with the independent label T.A.G. (also known as The Armada Group) and are most notable for their street singles "Go Head Shawty", and "Airplanes", both of which were produced by T-Minus. In 2006, they released their independent debut EP The World Is Yours, and shot a video, "The Preparation", featuring Kim Davis. Their singles "Watchu Sayin'" and "Oh My" reached number one on Flow 93.5's Mega City Countdown.

The group are also featured in the song and video for "Infamous" by Toronto-based electronicore band Abandon All Ships.

In August 2021, Rommel Hinds-Grannun posted on his Facebook page: "Formally Known As A-Game, The Twinz Are Back On The Scene Signed To Rich Homie Quan As 'Duuo'. He also announced that they had released a single, "Stadium".

== Arrest ==
The duo were arrested in March 2025 on charges of human trafficking and money laundering by Waterloo Regional Police Services in Kitchener, Ontario.

== Discography ==
=== EPs ===
- The World Is Yours (EP)
- Running on Time (Mixtape)
- Since 1988 (Mixtape)
- Boarding Pass (Mixtape), 2013
- DON (EP), 2016

=== Singles ===
- 2008: "The Preparation" feat. Kim Davis
- 2009: "Go Head Shawty"
- 2010: "Airplanes"
- 2011: "Watchu Sayin"
- 2011: "Oh My"
- 2012: "Cool Boyz"
- 2012: "Cool Boyz Remix" feat Red Cafe
- 2012: "Money Made Me Do It"
- 2012: "Money Made Me Do It Remix" feat Kardinal Offishall
- 2012: "Money Made Me Do It Remix" feat Ryan Leslie
- 2013: "Homicide" feat Maino
- 2013: "Footprints"
- 2013: "Boarding Pass"
- 2014: "Sidelines"
- 2014: "Its Been a Minute"

== As featured artist ==
- 2011: "Rockstar Lifestyle" (Harvey Stripes featuring A-Game)
- 2012: "Infamous" (Abandon All Ships featuring A-Game)

== Videography ==
- "Go Head Shawty"
- "Airplanes"
- "The Preparation" feat. Kim Davis
- "Watchu Saying"
- "Oh My"
- "Cool Boyz"
- "Infamous" (Abandon All Ships featuring A-Game)
- "Homicide" featuring Maino
- "Money Made Me Do It" feat. Luu Breeze
