= Scarred by Beauty =

Danish band

- Origin: Copenhagen, Denmark
- Genres: Hardcore; Metalcore
- Years active: 2006-2014
- Labels: Screaming Records
- Past members: Asser Topp-Mortesen; Daniel Leszkowicz; Dennis Leszkowicz; Chris Kreutzfeldt; Jonathan Albrecthsen; See members section

Scarred by Beauty was a Danish hardcore band from Copenhagen, Denmark, formed in 2006.

The band released their first Demo in 2008 and in 2009 they released their We Swim EP, which propelled the band forward. Scarred by Beauty won the Talent of the Year award at the Danish Metal Awards 2009 and released their self-financed debut album Sutra in June 2011.

The band has toured Europe several times, including the UK and China. The band has supported many international artists counting The Black Dahlia Murder, I Killed The Prom Queen, Gojira and Meshuggah. In 2011 alone the band completed three European tours and one Danish tour and in 2012 Scarred by Beauty, besides touring Europe and UK, made it all the way to China. The band toured in China with Danish band The Kandidate, and the tour included shows at the Shanghai MIDI Festival.

Scarred by Beauty signed a single album deal with Mighty Music/Target Distribution for the release of their album debut Sutra in 2011. In 2012 the band signed a management contract for Scandinavia with Danish 3rd Tsunami Agency.

Scarred by Beauty's final album Cape Zero (released September 2013) was their second.

== Discography ==
- 2013 Cape Zero - Release worldwide on Screaming Records & Redfield Records
- 2011 Sutra (self financed studio album) – Release in EU and UK on Mighty Music
- 2009 We Swim EP (self financed)
- 2008 The Heritage of Ash (Demo)

== Members ==
- Daniel Leszkowicz – guitar (since 2006)
- Dennis Leszkowicz - drums (since 2006)
- Jonathan "Joller" Albrechtsen – lead vocals (since 2006)
- Asser Topp-Mortensen – guitar (since 2007)
- Chris Kreutzfeldt – bass (since 2010)
- Simon Guldbrandsen – bass (2006 - 2008)
- Martin Hasseldam – bass (2009 - 2010)
- Mathias Winther Johannsen – bass (2008 - 2009)

== Videography ==
- "We are Reflections" (2013)
- "Lighthouse" (2013)
- "Egypt, I am Dying" (2013)
- "Indika" (2011)
