= Das Monster aus dem Schrank =

2008 studio album by We Butter the Bread with Butter

Studio album by We Butter the Bread with Butter
- Released: 21 November 2008
- Recorded: 2007–2008
- Genre: Deathcore; electronicore; melodic death metal
- Length: 41:19
- Language: German, English
- Label: Redfield
- Producer: Marcel Neumann

We Butter the Bread with Butter chronology
Das Monster aus dem Schrank (2008)	Der Tag an dem die Welt unterging (2010)

Das Monster aus dem Schrank (German for "the monster from the closet") is the debut full-length studio album by German deathcore band We Butter the Bread with Butter. It was released on 21 November 2008 by Redfield Records. After an initial self-release of 100 copies. The album was also released simultaneously in North America. The total print run is therefore well over 5000 copies. It is the band's first of two studio albums to feature lead vocalist Tobias Schultka.

== Background and recording ==
In 2007, Marcel Neumann and Tobias Schultka began emulating their musical idols, such as Suicide Silence and Crystal Castles. This led to their first song, initially without lyrics. The song "Backe, Backe Kuchen" (Bake, Bake a Cake) originated from the idea that the syllables of "In der Küche riecht es lecker" (It smells delicious in the kitchen) fit the music well. This gave birth to the idea of reinterpreting children's songs. All the songs on the album were recorded entirely at Marcel Neumann's home. The band refuses to record in a studio because they believe it stifles creativity. The album, from writing and recording the songs to designing the cover, was created entirely during the semester break.

== Style ==
Many songs are reinterpretations of well-known German children's songs or at least partially incorporate their lyrics, but placed in a new context (such as "Godzilla," which partly consists of the lyrics of "Auf der Mauer, auf der Lauer"). The vocals are mostly guttural. They range from high screams and pig squeals to low growls. The guitar playing is rather technically oriented. As is typical in deathcore, breakdowns and blast beats are frequently used, but electronic elements can also be heard, which is not standard for the genre. Certain genre-typical playing styles are deliberately exaggerated (e.g., "Extrem"). The band themselves describe their style as "Deathcore-Electro-Nursery-Buttercore".

== Review ==
The following is a review of the album from hardkern.de:

We Butter The Bread With Butter deliver brutal metalcore here, which rolls forward with considerable force and makes no compromises. Add to that vicious growls, pig squeals, and razor-sharp screams that, figuratively speaking, almost freeze your blood. However, even the funniest joke eventually gets old, and 'The Monster from the Closet' loses some of its initial fascination after two-thirds of its runtime.

bloodchamber.de writes:

This album has everything it needs: riffs, double bass and growls galore, brilliant and imaginative lyrics, a killer cover with a fitting name, and a killer production, where only the vocals of the mastermind behind the mic could have been a bit more powerful. - (9.5/10)

== Track listing ==
No.	Title	English translation^{[*]}	Length
1.	"Intro"		0:19
2.	"Schlaf, Kindlein, Schlaf"	Sleep, Little Child, Sleep	2:25
3.	"Willst Du Mit Mir Gehn?"	Do You Want To Go With Me?	2:15
4.	"Das Monster aus dem Schrank"	The Monster From The Closet	3:27
5.	"Breekachu"	Pun of the words "bree", being an onomatopoeia of pig squeal vocals, and "Pikachu"	1:45
6.	"Hänschen Klein"	Little Hans	1:37
7.	"Terminator und Popeye"	Terminator and Popeye	2:11
8.	"Backe, Backe Kuchen"	Baking, Baking Cake	2:19
9.	"World of Warcraft"		2:15
10.	"Fuchs Du Hast die Gans Gestohlen"	Fox, You Stole The Goose	2:34
11.	"Alle Meine Entchen"	All My Ducklings	2:17
12.	"I Shot the Sheriff" (Bob Marley Cover)		1:47
13.	"Hänsel und Grätel"	Hansel and Gretel	2:27
14.	"Der Kuckuck und der Esel"	The Cuckoo And The Donkey	2:07
15.	"Extrem"	Extreme	5:25

Bonus tracks
No.	Title	English translation^{[*]}	Length
16.	"Godzilla"		2:07
17.	"Alle Meine Entchen (Orchester-Version)"	All My Ducklings (orchestra version)	2:52
18.	"Schlaf, Kindlein Schlaf (Electro-Version)"	Sleep, Little Child, Sleep (electro version)	2:24
19.	"See You Lätta Brotenkopf (Erster WBTBWB Song)"		0:41
Total length:			41:19

== Personnel ==
- Tobias "Tobi" Schultka – vocals, drums, programming
- Marcel "Marci" Neumann – guitars, bass guitar, programming
