= Wieder geil! =

2015 studio album by We Butter the Bread with Butter

Studio album by We Butter the Bread with Butter
- Released: 22 May 2015
- Recorded: 2013–2014
- Genre: Deathcore; metalcore; electronicore
- Length: 35:56
- Language: German, English
- Label: AFM
- Producer: Marcel Neumann

We Butter the Bread with Butter chronology
Goldkinder (2013)	Wieder geil! (2015)	Das Album (2021)

Professional ratings
Review scores
Source	Rating
Ultimate Guitar Archive	6.7/10

Wieder geil! (German for "horny again!") is the fourth studio album by German metalcore band We Butter the Bread with Butter, released on 22 May 2015 by AFM Records. It is also their final release to feature lead vocalist Paul Bartzsch, though original vocalist Tobias Schultka would later reunite with the band in 2019.

== Track listing ==
All tracks are written by We Butter the Bread with Butter.

No.	Title	Length
1.	"Ich mach was mit Medien"	3:05
2.	"Exorzist"	4:04
3.	"Anarchy"	4:01
4.	"Berlin, Berlin!"	3:59
5.	"Bang Bang Bang"	2:26
6.	"Gib mir Mehr"	4:13
7.	"Rockstar"	3:30
8.	"Thug Life"	3:03
9.	"Warum lieben wir nicht Mehr"	4:06
10.	"Zombiebitch"	3:29
Total length:		35:56

== Credits ==
Writing, performance and production credits are adapted from the album liner notes.

=== Personnel ===
==== We Butter the Bread with Butter ====
- Paul "Борщ" Bartzsch – vocals
- Marcel Neumann – guitar, keyboard, programming
- Maximilian Saux – bass
- Can Özgünsür – drums

==== Additional musicians ====
- Daniel Haniß – synthesizer

==== Production ====
- Marcel Neumann – production, recording
- Daniel Haniß – mixing, FX production
- Aljoscha Sieg – stem mixing and mastering

==== Artwork and design ====
- Paul Bartzsch – artwork
- Martin E. Landsmann – photography

=== Studios ===
- Karma Recordings – mixing

== Charts ==
Chart	Peak position
German Albums (Offizielle Top 100)	31
US World Albums (Billboard)	9
