= Das Album (We Butter the Bread with Butter album) =

2021 studio album by We Butter the Bread with Butter

Studio album by We Butter the Bread with Butter
- Released: 24 September 2021
- Recorded: 2019–2020
- Genre: Electronicore; metalcore; deathcore
- Length: 41:28
- Language: German, English
- Label: AFM

We Butter the Bread with Butter chronology
Wieder geil! (2015)	Das Album (2021)

Singles from Das Album
- 1. "N!CE" Released: 28 July 2021

Professional ratings
Review scores
Source	Rating
Metal-Roos	4/5
MMH Radio	4.5/5
Noizze	7/10
Sonic Perspectives	8.8/10

Das Album (German for "The Album") is the fifth studio album by German electronicore band We Butter the Bread with Butter, released on 24 September 2021 by AFM Records. The song "N!CE" was released as a single in advance. The album marks the return of original vocalist Tobias Schultka who reunited with the band in 2019, though only he and multi-instrumentalist Marcel "Marcie" Neumann were present in recording the album.

== Track listing ==
All tracks are written by We Butter the Bread with Butter.

No.	Title	Length
1.	"Das Album Intro"	1:05
2.	"Dreh Auf!"	3:04
3.	"20 km/h"	3:11
4.	"N!CE"	3:01
5.	"Schreibwarenfachverkäufer"	3:33
6.	"Läuft"	2:36
7.	"Jump 'n' Run"	3:50
8.	"Sprich sie einfach an"	2:49
9.	"Meine Finger sind zu klein"	4:03
10.	"Piks mich"	3:49
11.	"Metal"	3:29
12.	"Angriff der Dönerteller"	3:37
13.	"Letzter Song"	3:21
Total length:		41:28

== Personnel ==
- Tobias "Tobi" Schultka – lead vocals, drums, programming
- Marcel "Marcie" Neumann – guitars, bass, keyboards, programming, backing vocals

== Charts ==
Chart	Peak position
German Albums (Offizielle Top 100)	8
