= Alazka =

German post-hardcore band

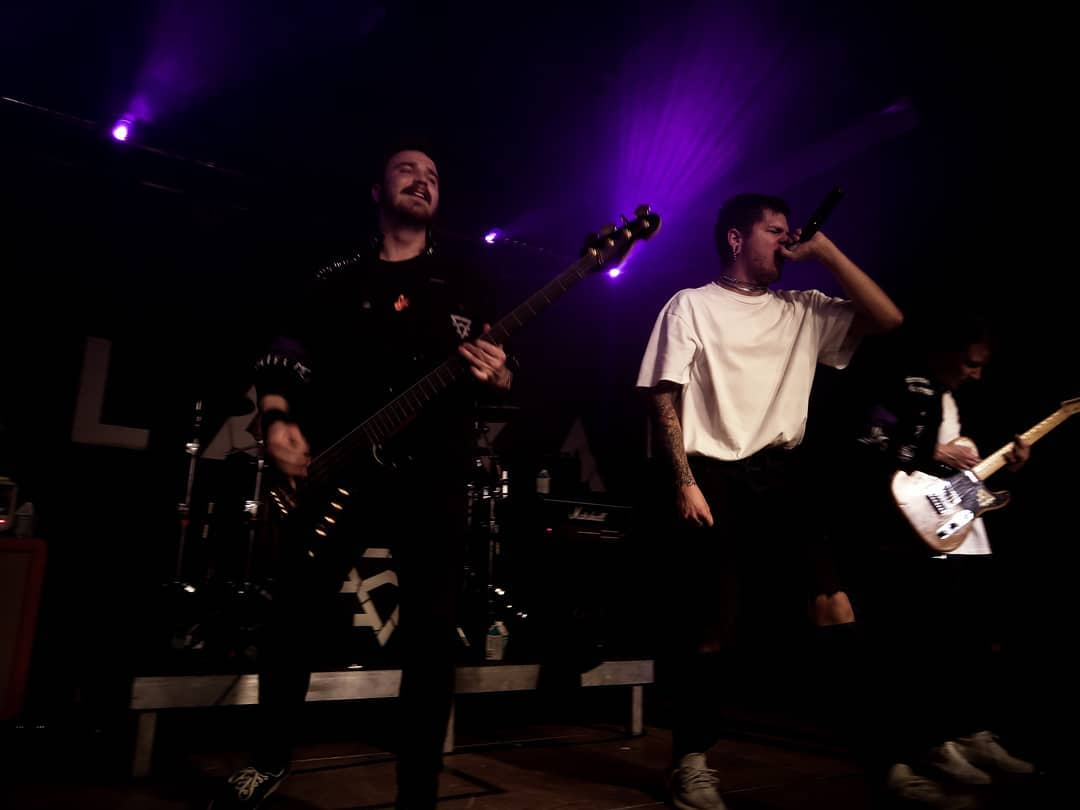
- Alazka 2019 in Milan

Background information
- Origin: Recklinghausen, North Rhine-Westphalia, Germany
- Genres: Post-hardcore; metalcore
- Years active: 2012–2020
- Labels: Redfield Records; SharpTone Records; Arising Empire
- Past members: Tobias Rische; Marvin Bruckwilder; Julian Englisch; Tobias Lotze; Jonas Baier; Kassim Auale; Dario Sanchez

Alazka, (stylized in all caps) formerly known as Burning Down Alaska, was a German melodic hardcore band, originally from Recklinghausen, North Rhine-Westphalia, active from 2012 till their disbandment in 2020.

== History ==
=== As Burning Down Alaska ===
The band was formed in 2012 by guitarist Marvin Bruckwilder, bassist Julian Englisch, and drummer Jonas Baier under the original name 'Burning Down Alaska'. At the start of 2013, a second guitarist, Dario Sanchez, was recruited to the band and as 2013 came to a close, Tobias Rische was brought into the fold as the vocalist. On February 18, 2015, the band signed a record deal with Redfield Records, and within a month they released their debut EP Values & Virtues. The song titled 'Phantoms' on the EP, features Being as an Ocean singer and guitarist Michael McGough as a featured artist. Shortly afterwards, the band went on a small European tour with the American metalcore band Kingdom of Giants, which took them throughout Central Europe. This was followed by appearances with The Ghost Inside and Parkway Drive, as well as appearances at the Impericon Festival in Leipzig, the Mair1 Festival, and the Full Force music festival. In November 2015, the band was the opening act for the Never Say Die! Tour, which was also supported by Fit for a King, Cruel Hand, Being as an Ocean, Defeater, and The Amity Affliction. In May 2016, the group completed their first headlining tour along with Sailing Before The Wind in Japan. Beforehand, the band played a European tour in March, accompanied by Acres and Casey. In August of that year, the band performed at Summer Breeze Open Air 2016. During that same year, they welcomed in an additional vocalist, Kassim Auale. Also, Baier departed the band and was replaced with Tobias Lotze as the new drummer.

=== Name Change to ALAZKA ===
On March 29, 2017, the band officially announced that they were changing their name to ALAZKA. They then signed with SharpTone Records and Arising Empire. During that same year, they released their first album titled "Phoenix" and headlined the Phoenix tour throughout Europe.

=== Band breakup ===
On October 4, 2019, the single titled "Dead End" was released. Sometime after, Kassim and Dario departed from the band. In September 2020, during the COVID-19 pandemic, the band dissolved.

=== Post dissolvement ===
In 2022, ex-guitarist Marvin Bruckwilder, now being referred to as Marv Wilder, teamed up with former Time, The Valuator frontman Phil Bayer in starting a new music project under the duo name FLOYA.

== Band members ==
=== Final lineup ===
- Tobias Rische - vocals
- Marvin Bruckwilder - guitar
- Julian Englisch - bass
- Tobias Lotze - drums

=== Past members ===
- Kassim Auale - vocals
- Dario Sanchez - guitar
- Jonas Baier - drums

== Discography ==
Albums

- Phoenix (2017)

EPs

- Values & Virtues (2015)

Singles

- Blossom (2016)
- Empty Throne (2017)
- Phoenix (2017)
- Ghost (2017)
- Dead End (2019)

Music Videos

- Farewell (2012)
- Brighter Days (2013)
- Monuments (2014)
- Savior (2014)
- Phantoms (2015)
- Clockwork (2015)
- Blossom (2016)
- Empty Throne (2017)
- Phoenix (2017)
- Everything (2018)
- Dead End (2019)
- Living Hell (2020)
