= Skip the Foreplay =

Canadian trancecore band

- Also known as: Now and on Earth
- Origin: Montreal, Quebec, Canada
- Genres: electronicore, metalcore
- Years active: 2010–2014
- Label: Epitaph Records
- Members: Marc-André Fillion; Mathieu Maltais; Charles "Chuck" Pilon; Julien Guy-Béland; Marc-André Lemyre; Jean-Michel Aumais

Skip the Foreplay was a trancecore band from Montreal which rose to prominence by covering the song Champagne Showers by LMFAO. In addition to the habitual vocals, guitars, bass and drums of metalcore, the band featured a DJ, Jean-Michel Aumais, and their music adds club beats, auto-tuned vocals and dubstep to the elements of metalcore. They changed their name to Now and on Earth in 2014.

== History ==
The band started in 2010 when Charles Pilon, who previously played in a metal band, put an ad on the internet looking for musicians. That's how he met Maltais and the others.

They then got in contact with Obey the Brave and Despised Icon singer Alex Erian, who accepted to make a guest appearance on the song "This City We're Taking Over", which was released as their first single in 2011. Jonathan Cabana from metalcore band Blind Witness and Tony Gambino of Blessed by a Broken Heart also sang on the single. This single and the accompanying video got them a lot of visibility on YouTube.

Erian also became their manager and helped them get a contract with Epitaph Records in December 2011, only a few months after they started playing together.

They had recorded and produced their first album, "Nightlife", themselves and had presented it to many record labels before signing with Epitaph

They got a lot of attention for their cover of Champagne Showers by LMFAO, for which they made a video that got more than one million views on YouTube. At first, Champagne Showers was not on Nightlife but Epitaph asked for it to be included, so the band added it to the album. Skip the Foreplay made many tours in Canada, U.S.A. and Japan, opening for Falling in Reverse, Lamb of God, Hollywood Undead and many other Epitaph bands and playing the Vans Warped Tour in 2012.

After its release, "Nightlife" climbed to the 15th position of Billboard Magazine Heatseekers Albums Chart.

In 2014, they changed their name to "Now and on Earth" after bass player Julien Guy-Béland, drummer Marc-André Lemyre and DJ Jean-Michael Aumais left the band. They were replaced by bass player Anthony Alain-Rossi, drummer Philippe Beauchamp and keyboard player Philippe Ferguson and released the album "Blacked Out" on Epitaph on April 13.

== Members ==
- Marc-André Fillion - vocals
- Mathieu Maltais - rhythm guitar
- Charles "Chuck" Pilon - lead guitar
- Julien Guy-Béland - bass guitar
- Marc-André Lemyre - drums
- Jean-Michel Aumais - keyboards, programming

== Discography ==
- Nightlife (2012, Epitaph)
