= Any Given Day =

German metalcore band

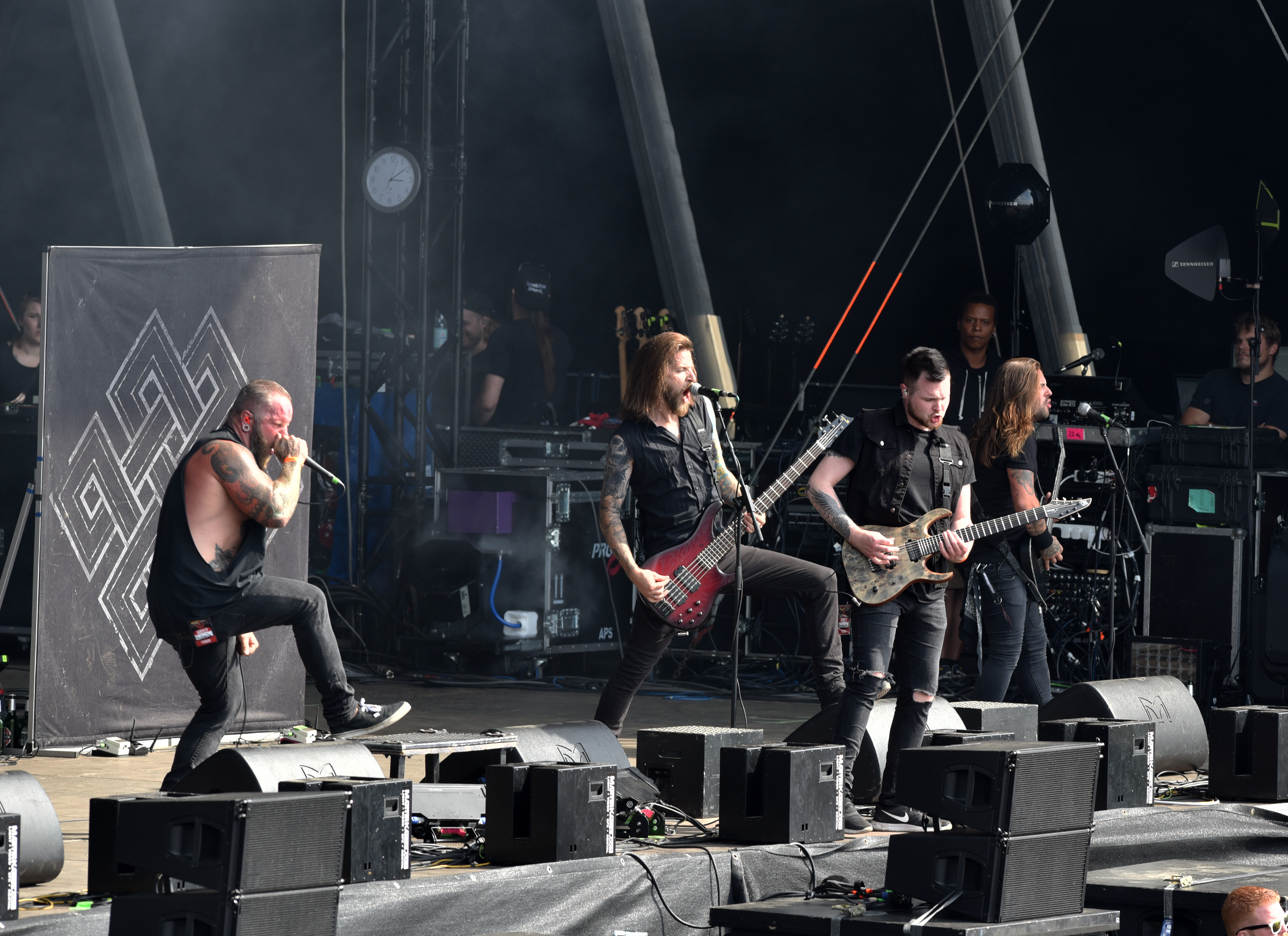
- Any Given Day at Reload Festival 2017

Background information
- Origin: Gelsenkirchen, North Rhine-Westphalia, Germany
- Genres: Metalcore; melodic metalcore
- Years active: 2012–present
- Labels: Redfield; Arising Empire; SharpTone
- Members: Dennis Diehl; Andy Posdziech; Dennis ter Schmitten; Michael Golinski; Leon Stiller
- Past members: Raphael Altmann
- Website: anygivenday.eu

Any Given Day is a German metalcore band formed in 2012 in Gelsenkirchen.

== History ==
The band was formed in 2012 by singer Dennis Diehl, guitarists Andy Posdziech and Dennis ter Schmitten, bassist Michael Golinski and drummer Raphael Altmann who played in several bands before forming Any Given Day.

In October 2012 they recorded a three-track self-titled demo. All three songs were re-recorded on their debut album My Longest Way Home, which was released worldwide in September 2014 via Redfield Records. The album peaked on No. 28 in the German album charts and lasted there for one week. To promote the album the band toured in four cities in Germany: Munich, Bochum, Stuttgart and Berlin.

In January 2014, the band toured with Caliban for three shows and with Sonic Syndicate in September.

In the beginning of 2015 they again supported Caliban on their Ghost Empire Tour along with Bury Tomorrow and Dream On, Dreamer. In 2016, the band recorded a song entitled "Arise" with singer and guitarist Matt Heafy of Trivium.

In 2019, they released their third studio album Overpower with songs such as "Savior" and "Taking Over Me".

After the departure of longtime drummer Raphael Altmann, Leon Stiller was named the new drummer of Any Given Day. The band has released three new singles, Apocalypse, Get That Done And Unbreakable.

== Band members ==
Current members

- Dennis Diehl – lead vocals (2012–present)
- Andy Posdziech – lead guitar (2012–present)
- Michael Golinski – bass, backing vocals (2012–present)
- Dennis ter Schmitten – rhythm guitar, backing vocals (2012–present)
- Leon Stiller – drums (2019–present)

Former members

- Raphael Altmann – drums (2012–2019)

== Discography ==
=== Albums ===
Year	Title	Label	Peak positions	
Year	Title	Label	GER	AUT
2014	My Longest Way Home	Redfield Records	28	—
2016	Everlasting	Redfield Records	14	57
2019	Overpower	Arising Empire	19	61
2024	Limitless	Arising Empire	33	—

=== Singles ===
- Home Is Where The Heart Is (2013)
- Home Is Where The Heart Is (Acoustic) (2014)
- Endurance (2016)
- Arise (featuring Matt Heafy) (2016)
- Levels (2016)
- Savior (2018)
- Loveless (2018)
- Lonewolf (2019)
- Apocalypse (2022)
- Wind of Change (2022)
- Diamonds (2022)
- Get That Done (2023)
- Unbreakable (2023)
- H.A.T.E. (featuring Annisokay) (2023)

=== Demos ===
- Any Given Day (2012)
