= Audrey Kuchen =

Audrey Kuchen is a television news reporter for FOX CT in Hartford, Connecticut. She served as co-anchor on KOBI-TV's NBC 5 News at 6pm with Christina Anderson and anchor and producer of KMVU-TV's FOX 26 First At Ten newscast at 10pm until July 2010.

Audrey is an east coast native. She grew up in Madison, Connecticut, and later attended and graduated from the University of Arizona, majoring in Media Arts and Journalism. While attending college, Audrey was a reporter for the Arizona State Senate broadcast division in Phoenix, a sports intern for KVOA Channel 4 in Tucson and Creative Director for the Tucson-based Campus Magazine. Audrey also interned for KTVU Channel 2 in Oakland and reported for the Hometown News Network in the San Francisco Bay Area. Audrey is a member of American Women in Radio and Television and Gamma Phi Beta.
