= We Butter the Bread with Butter =

German metalcore band

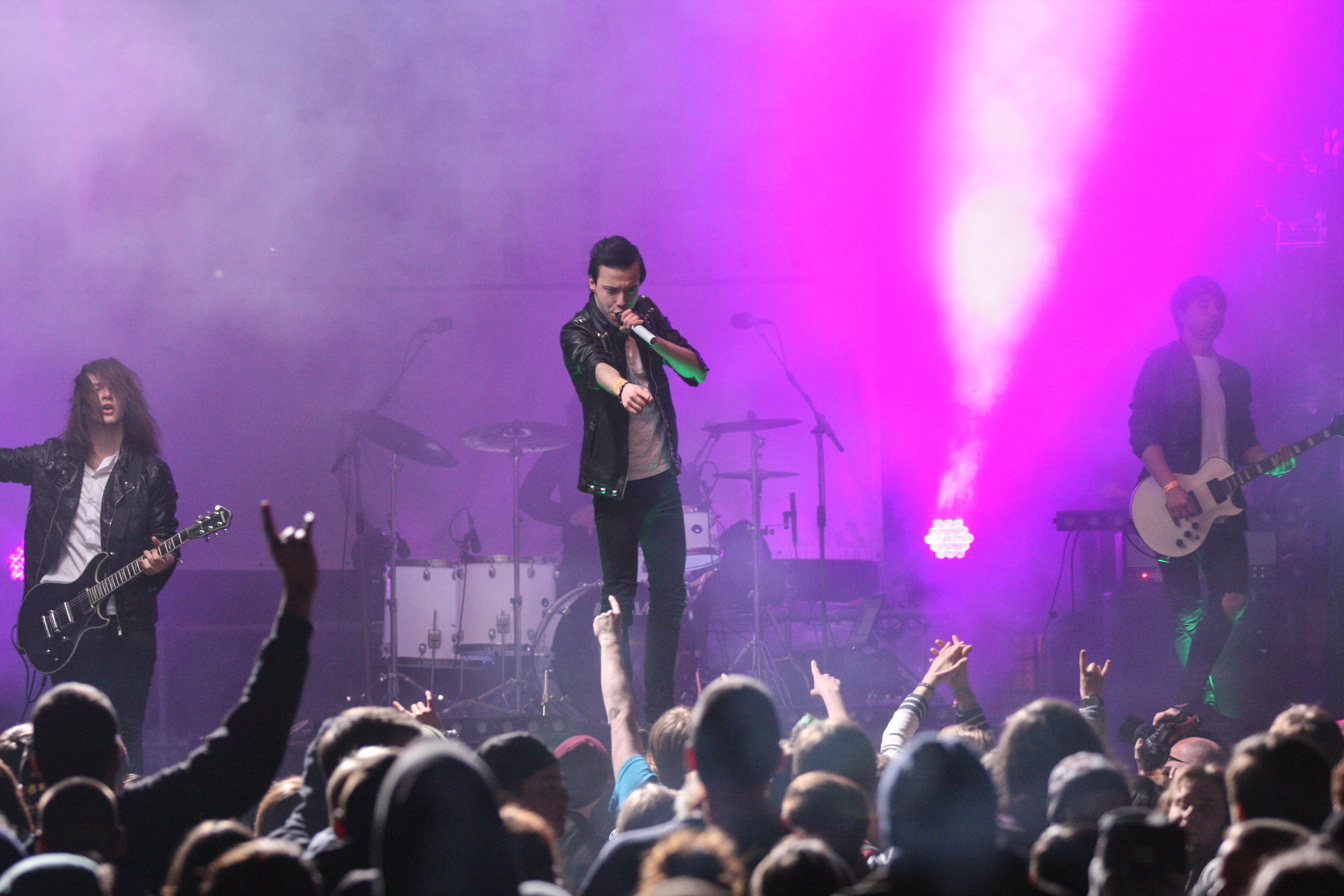
- WBTBWB at Rock in Caputh 2013

Background information
- Origin: Berlin, Germany
- Genres: Deathcore; electronicore; metalcore
- Years active: 2007–present
- Labels: AFM; Redfield
- Members: Marcel Neumann; Tobias Schultka
- Past members: Kenneth Iain Duncan; Maximilian Pauly Saux; Paul Bartzsch; Can Özgünsür; Axel Goldmann
- Website: wbtbwb.de

We Butter the Bread with Butter (also known as WBTBWB) is a German deathcore band noted for their heavy use of electronic music characteristics. The group was founded in 2007 by guitarist Marcel Neumann and vocalist Tobias Schultka. Later, they were signed to Redfield Records, and released two albums through the label. Their debut album Das Monster aus dem Schrank was released on 21 November 2008. Their second album, Der Tag an dem die Welt unterging was released on 14 May 2010, followed on 19 December 2012 by an EP titled Projekt Herz. Their third studio album, Goldkinder, was released on 9 August 2013, and a fourth album, Wieder geil!, was released on 22 May 2015. In Late 2019, Schultka rejoined the band after 9 years away, and the band went back to being the original duo of Schultka and Neumann. On 24 September 2021 they released their 5th studio album, Das Album. It is their first album as a duo in 11 years.

== History ==
We Butter the Bread with Butter was founded in 2007 by Marcel Neumann, who was originally guitarist for Martin Kesici's band, and Tobias Schultka. The band was originally meant as a joke but progressed into being a more serious musical duo.

The band's name "We Butter the Bread with Butter" came from being bored with many other metal band names, which are often long and sound dark. Instead, they chose a name that is similarly long, but makes it clear the band are super normal guys who are into music. Its origins were suggested when the two original members were driving in a car operated by Marcel Neumann and an accident almost occurred. Neumann found Schultka "so funny that he briefly lost control of the vehicle." Many of their songs from this point were covers of German folk tales and nursery rhymes.

On the "Infiziert-Tour 2008" (German: 'Infected-Tour 2008') they performed together with the German metalcore band Callejon and the post-hardcore band, The Parachutes in major cities in Germany such as Berlin, Frankfurt, Hamburg, Cologne and Stuttgart and furthermore opened for A Day to Remember multiple times. After that, both members turned to the production of their second full-length album, Der Tag an dem die Welt unterging, which was released on 14 May 2010 in Germany, the US and Japan. During the production of the album, three new musicians joined WBTBWB with Kenneth Iain Duncan now being the second guitarist, Maximilian Pauly Saux playing the bass and Can Özgünsür as drummer.

Tobias Schultka, vocalist and founding member of We Butter the Bread with Butter when the group was a duo, parted ways with the band in June 2010. The reason stated was that he wanted to focus on being an application developer for Apple Inc. Schultka is found on multiple websites and is known for his company and production of his iPhone game, Happy Chewing Gum. Schultka was replaced by Paul Bartzsch.

On 28 June 2012 Kenneth Duncan announced his departure from the band via his personal Facebook page, citing creative and personal differences. The band posted a video on YouTube called We Butter the Bread with Butter - New EP and Album Trailer on 28 October. The video stated that the EP would come out in 2012 and the new album would come out on 12 April 2013. The following day the band posted a picture of the album art for Projekt Herz EP on Facebook. The band released the EP on 19 December 2012.

On 21 April 2013 the band revealed via Facebook the cover and the name of the third album, Goldkinder. A few months later, on 18 June, the band released another single from their upcoming album, Goldkinder, titled "Das Uhrwerk". The band released their first music video for "Alles was ich Will", from their upcoming album Goldkinder, on their official YouTube channel on 10 July. On 16 July 2013, the band revealed a US tour via their official Facebook page. WBTBWB released Goldkinder was released on 9 August.

On 12 June 2014 the band released a new song titled "Weltmeister" on YouTube. This was followed on 13 April 2015, by a song titled "Ich mach was mit Medien", which was featured on the band's fourth album Wieder geil!, released on 22 May 2015. On 20 January 2017 the band released a music video for a song called Klicks. Likes. Fame. Geil! via AFM Records.

On 12 April 2019 Paul Bartzsch announced his departure from the band via his personal Instagram, the reason being that things happened in the past without [his] knowledge. Paul also uploaded a picture announcing his departure to Instagram, saying "Thank you for all the support over the past 8 years! I will never forget all the love, support, and adventures." On 27 October 2019, the band announced Schultka's return to the vocalist position. Two days later, the 2019 Rehab European Tour was announced, with Electric Callboy. WBTBWB were to perform in the original line-up of duo Marcie and Tobi. On 24 November 2019 the band announced the release of their new single, "Dreh Auf!", which was released on 30 November 2019 via AFM Records on YouTube.

While the band had no public appearance in 2020, Neumann did help produce "MC Thunder II (Dancing Like A Ninja)", off of Electric Callboy's MMXX EP. Subsequently, WBTBWB was announced as one of the multiple artists to remix "Hypa Hypa", another song from the same EP. A week later, it was announced that the first new album as a duo will be titled Das Album, which was released on 24 September 2021.

== Legacy ==
In 2020, Ultimate Guitar senior editor David Slavković named We Butter Bread With Butter the fourth "weirdest band name of all time," asking: "Isn't this name too tender and buttery for a deathcore band?" They have been cited as a major influence on electronicore and its subgenres.

== Band members ==
We Butter the Bread with Butter, live at With Full Force 2018

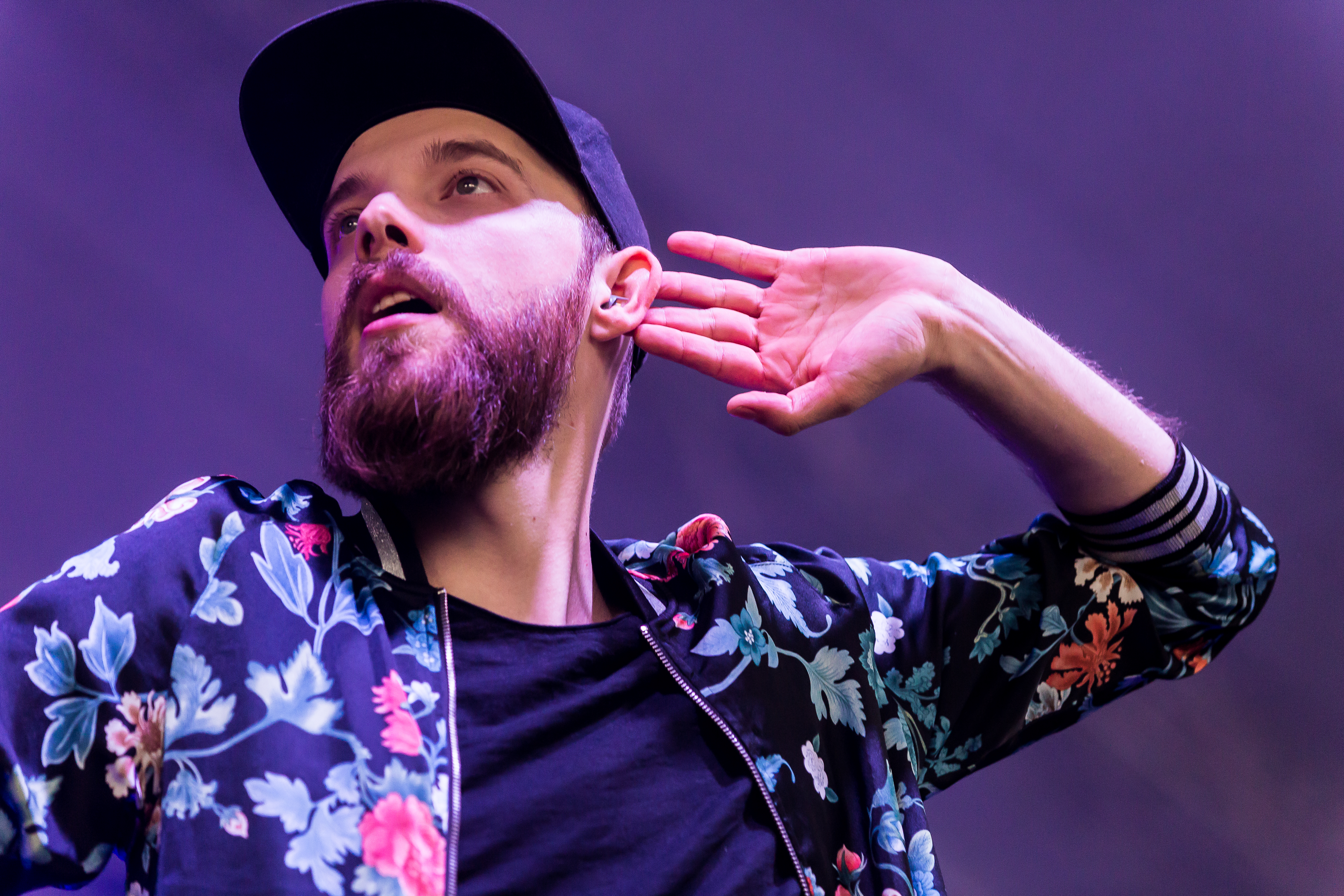
Ex-vocalist Paul Bartzsch

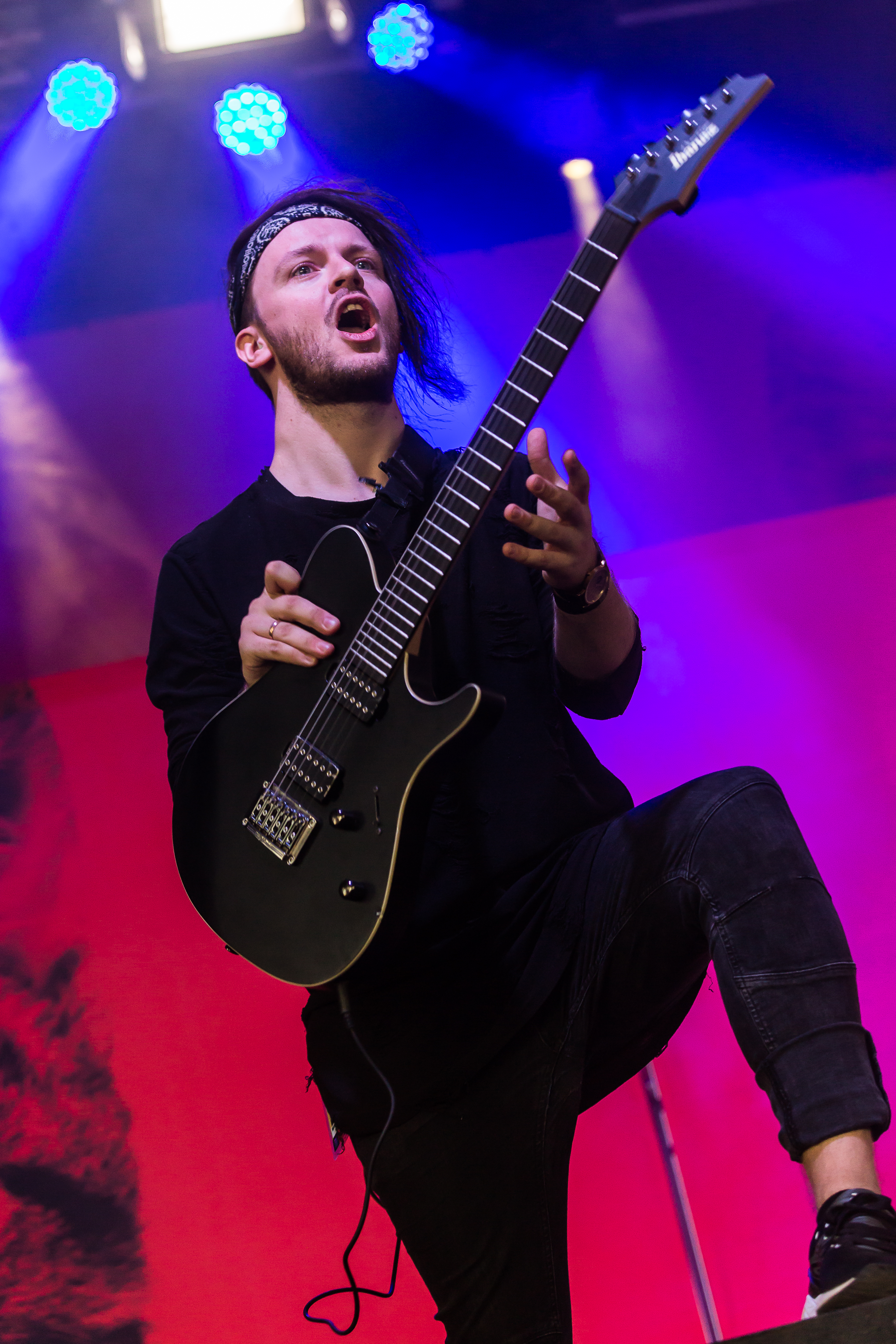
Guitarist Marcel Neumann

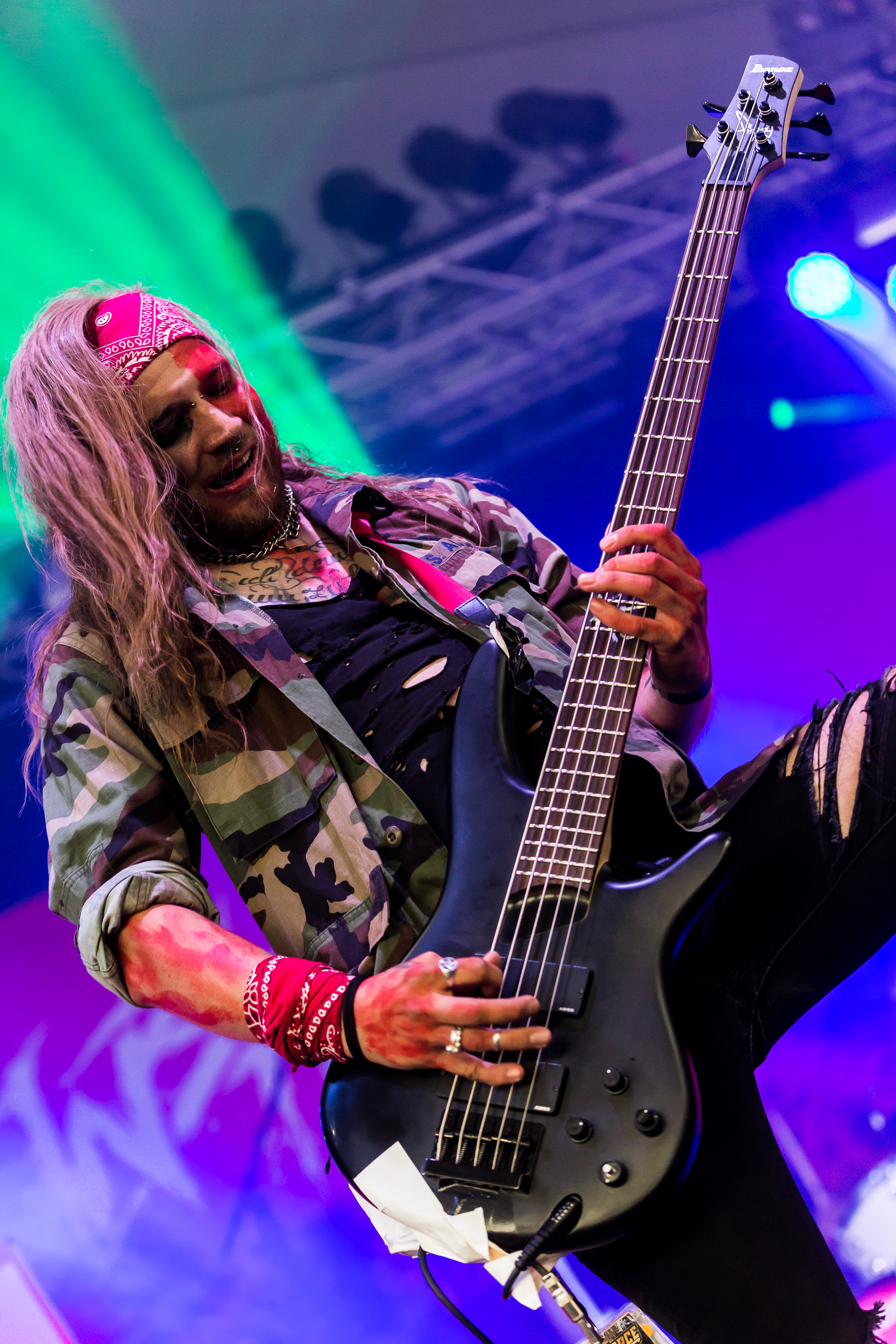
Ex-bassist Axel Goldmann

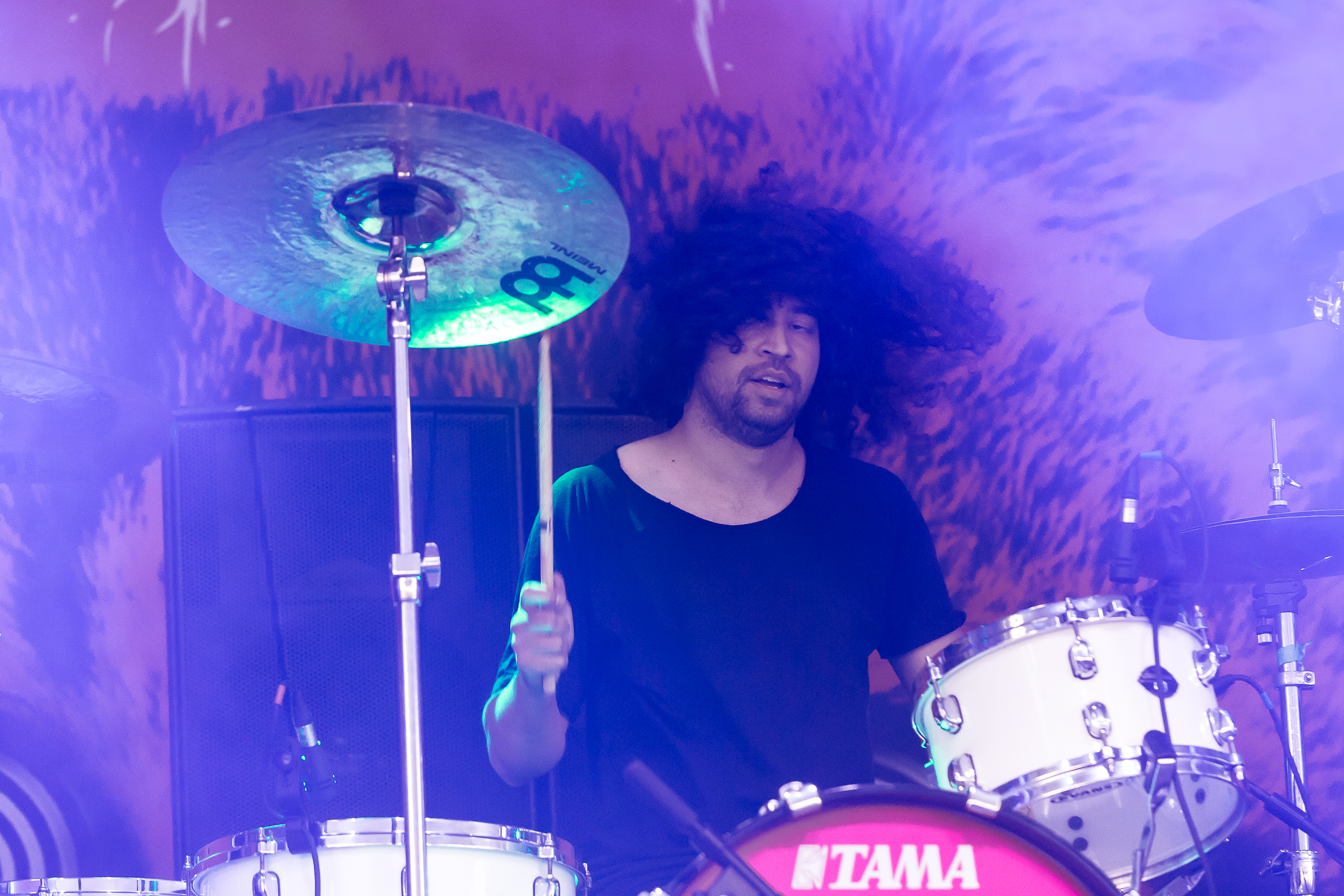
Ex-drummer Can Özgünsür

Current

- Marcel "Marcie" Neumann – guitar, synthesizers, programming, backing vocals (2007–present), bass (2007–2010, 2019–present)
- Tobias "Tobi" Schultka – lead vocals (2007–2010, 2019–present), drums, programming (2007–2010)

Former

- Kenneth Iain Duncan – guitar (2010–2012)
- Maximilian Pauly Saux – bass, backing vocals (2010–2015)
- Paul Bartzsch – lead vocals (2010–2019)
- Can Özgünsür – drums (2010–2019)
- Axel Goldmann – bass (2015–2019)

== Discography ==
=== Studio albums ===
List of studio albums, with selected chart positions
| Year | Album details | Peak chart positions | |
| Year | Album details | GER | AUT |
|---|---|---|---|
| 2008 | Das Monster aus dem Schrank: Released: 21 November 2008; Label: Redfield | — | — |
| 2010 | Der Tag an dem die Welt unterging: Released: 14 May 2010; Label: Redfield | — | — |
| 2013 | Goldkinder: Released: 9 August 2013; Label: independent | 27 | 70 |
| 2015 | Wieder geil!: Released: 22 May 2015; Label: AFM | 31 | — |
| 2021 | Das Album: Released: 24 September 2021; Label: AFM | 8 | — |

=== Singles and EPs ===
- 2012: USA
- 2012: Projekt Herz
- 2013: Pyroman & Astronaut
- 2013: Alles was ich will
- 2014: Weltmeister
- 2015: Ich mach was mit Medien
- 2015: Bang Bang Bang
- 2015: Berlin! Berlin!
- 2015: Anarchy
- 2017: Klicks. Likes. Fame. Geil!
- 2017: Man's Not Hot (Big Shaq cover)
- 2019: Dreh auf!
- 2021: 20 km/h
- 2021: N!CE

=== Music videos ===
List of music videos, showing year released and director
| Year | Title | Album | Director(s) |
|---|---|---|---|
| 2013 | "Alles was ich will" | Goldkinder | Soeren Schaller, Martin Grau |
| 2013 | "Meine Brille" | Goldkinder | Soeren Schaller, Martin Grau |
| 2014 | "Ohne Herz" | Goldkinder | —N/a |
| 2014 | "Weltmeister" | —N/a | —N/a |
| 2015 | "Berlin, Berlin!" | Wieder geil! | —N/a |
| 2015 | "Exorzist" | Wieder geil! | —N/a |
| 2017 | "Klicks. Likes. Fame. Geil!" | —N/a | —N/a |
| 2019 | "Dreh Auf!" | Das Album | Schillo Brothers |
| 2021 | "20 km/h" | Das Album | Schillo Brothers |
| 2021 | "N!CE" | Das Album | Peter Grünheim |
