= Face Tomorrow =

Dutch indie rock band

Face Tomorrow is a Dutch indie rock band. It was formed in 1997, and consists of lead singer Jelle Schrooten, guitarists Aart Steekelenburg and Marc Nolte, bass player Tijs Hop, and drummer Sjoerd van der Knoop. In 2010 Nolte left and was replaced by Ralf Mastwijk.

Face Tomorrow first released an EP called Live the Dream in 2001, but became one of the leading Dutch underground bands after the release of their first album For Who You Are in 2002. After the band released its second album The Closer You Get in 2004, Face Tomorrow toured all over Europe and the United States, playing festivals like Lowlands, Pukkelpop, Noorderslag, Bochum Total, Groezrock and Paaspop. In 2006 they recorded a cover of the song "You Can't Change The World" for an album with songs of The Apers with bands like Peter Pan Speedrock, Travoltas, El Pino & the Volunteers etc.

In October 2008, the band's third full-length album In the Dark was released on Excelsior Recordings. The 13 songs, a.o. the singles 'Overpowered' (with a video clip made by director Peter Greenaway), 'Trial and Error' and 'Darkside' were recorded at the Mailmen studios at the beginning of 2008. Besides the a CD-version, a limited edition blue vinyl 2x12" version in a gatefold sleeve was released with artwork by Dutch artist/illustrator Mara Piccione.

After more than ten years of service guitar player Marc Nolte decided to leave the band in January 2010; he was replaced by Ralf Mastwijk, with whom the band wrote a new album during the first half of 2010. In the summer they recorded their fourth full-length album at the Split Second Sound studio in Amsterdam, produced and engineered by Jochem Jacobs. At the end of 2010 they signed with German Redfield Records for the release of their new, self-titled album, and on 25 February the new single "The Fix" was released with a music video produced and directed by former band member Marc Nolte and was followed by the release of their album on March 25, 2011, which they presented at a sold-out release party at Rotown in their home town Rotterdam on March 26. This time the artwork (and the band's new logo) has been designed by Dutch graphic designers Rob van den Nieuwenhuizen (of design studio DRAWSWORDS) and Barbara Hennequin.

== Discography ==
=== Albums ===
- For Who You Are (Reflections Records, 2002)
- The Closer You Get (Reflections Records, 2004)
- In the Dark (Excelsior Recordings, 2008)
- Face Tomorrow (Redfield Records, 2011)

=== Singles ===
- Live the Dream (2001)
- Worth the Wait (2002)
- Sign Up (2004)
- My World Within (2005)
- Overpowered (2008)
- Trial & Error (2009)
- Darkside (2009)
- The Fix (2011)
- Lost in Montreal
- Move On (2012)

=== Miscellaneous ===
- Do The Aper! (2006)
- DVDs:
  - 03/02/05 (2005)
- Vinyl:
  - The Split Seveninch (split 7-inch met Lewesit/2001)
  - For Who You Are (12-inch/2002)
  - Winterblossom (10-inch verzamelalbum/2003)
  - The Closer You Get (2x10"/2005)
  - In The Dark (2x12"/2008)
  - Face Tomorrow (12-inch+cd/2011)
  - Worth the Wait / My World Within (acoustic 7-inch/2012)
- Demos
  - Ride Like a Girl (1998)
