= Time, The Valuator =

German progressive metal band

- Origin: Essen, Germany
- Genres: Progressive metal; progressive metalcore; djent; post-hardcore
- Years active: 2015–present
- Labels: Long Branch Records
- Members: Daniel Moczarski; Cedric Dreyszas; Rene Möllenbeck; Ryan Voosen; Yunus Proch
- Past members: See below

Time, The Valuator is a German progressive metal band from Essen, formed in 2015.

== History ==
On 3 August 2018, Time, The Valuator released their debut studio album entitled "How Fleeting, How Fragile". They toured English, French, and German clubs in 2018 and played at European festivals, including the Swedish High 5ive Summer Fest in Södertälje in 2018, the German Vacuum Fest in 2019, the British UK Tech Fest, the Dutch Submit Fest in Rotterdam, and the Fallen Fortress in Bad Dürkheim, Germany, in the same year.

In June 2019, the band released their first single, "Vibrant," featuring Rafael Andronic who replaced Bayer on vocals. In December of the same year, the band released the Billie Eilish cover "Lovely" and music video with singer Charlotte Buchholz, who had previously worked with Novelists.

On 23 January 2022, the band announced the departure of singer Rafael Andronic for personal reasons and to focus on his project Anaura. In March 2022, the band announced Daniel Moczarski as their new singer.

Time, The Valuator have already performed on stage with Imminence, Hacktivist, Rise of the Northstar, For the Fallen Dreams, The Hirsch Effekt, Leprous, Monuments, and Vildhjarta.

== Musical style ==
Musically, Time, The Valuator are often classified as progressive metalcore, djent, and post-hardcore. The band's sound is also characterized by the use of synthesizers, piano passages, and groove elements. The band's sound is characterized by the "obvious catchy melodies combined with a very progressive atmosphere"—according to Michael Milkowski of MoreCore.de. Similar-sounding bands that have been cited for comparison include Erra, TesseracT, and Kadinja.

== Band members ==
Current members

- Daniel Moczarski – lead vocals (2022–present)
- Cedric Dreyszas – guitars (2017–present)
- Rene Möllenbeck – guitars, synthesizers (2015–present)
- Ryan Voosen – bass, synthesizers (2019–present)
- Yunus Proch – drums (2015–present)

Former members

- Phil Bayer – lead vocals (2015–2018)
- Rafael Andronic – lead vocals (2019–2022)
- Justin Schaffranek – guitars (2015–2017)
- Felix Jekubzik – bass (2017)
- Christoph Jordan – bass (2015–2017)

== Discography ==
=== Studio albums ===
- 2018: How Fleeting, How Fragile (Long Branch Records/SPV, Famined Records)

=== Singles ===
- 2019: Vibrant (Long Branch Records/SPV, Famined Records)
- 2019: Lovely feat. Charlotte Buchholz (Long Branch Records/SPV)
- 2022: Black Water (Long Branch Records/SPV)
- 2022: Ivy (Long Branch Records/SPV)
- 2022: Glow (Long Branch Records/SPV)
- 2022: Binary Pulse (Long Branch Records/SPV)
