= Redfield Records =

German independent record label

Coordinates: 51.2155°N 7.0102°E

- Founded: 2001
- Genre: Metalcore, punk rock, post-hardcore, emo
- Country of origin: Germany
- Location: Melle, Lower Saxony
- Official website: www.redfield-records.de

Redfield Records is a German independent label founded in Haan-Gruiten near Düsseldorf in 2001 and now residing in Melle near Osnabrück. In February 2013 the label founded their subsidiary under the name Redfield Digital which only distributes digital music worldwide.

The releases We Are the Mess by Electric Callboy and My Longest Way Home by Any Given Day marked the first two charting albums released by the label ever.

== Signed artists ==
=== Redfield Records ===
==== Currently signed ====
- (Germany) Any Given Day
- A Traitor Like Judas
- Alex Amsterdam
- Anchors & Hearts
- (Netherlands) Antillectual
- (Sweden) Cedron
- Dampfmaschine
- Desasterkids
- Flash Forward
- (Germany) (South Korea) (Sweden) Forever In Combat
- (Netherlands) For I Am King
- (United States) Gameface
- Iron Walrus
- (Israel) Kids Insane
- (Luxembourg) Mutiny on the Bounty
- Neberu
- (Finland) New Deadline
- (France) Shoot the Girl First
- (Liechtenstein) Taped
- The Pariah
- Team Stereo

==== Former bands ====
- A Case of Grenada
- Alias Caylon
- Andthewinneris
- Crash My DeVille
- Das Pack
- (Netherlands) Death Letters
- (Germany) Electric Callboy
- Elwood Stray
- Estrich Boy
- (Estonia) Eye Sea I
- (Netherlands) Face Tomorrow
- Fidget
- (Germany) Fire in the Attic
- (United States) Get Involved
- Go as in Gorgeous
- (Norway) Heroes & Zeros
- (United States) Jeff Caudill
- (Netherlands) John Coffey
- KMPFSPRT
- (Canada) Living with Lions
- (United States) March
- Me In A Million
- (United States) Nations Afire
- Narziss
- On When Ready
- (Canada) Sights & Sounds
- Sixxxten
- (Norway) Social Suicide
- Sonah
- Summer's Last Regret
- (United States) Texas in July
- (Netherlands) Textures
- That Very Time I Saw
- The Blackout Argument
- The Ordinary Me
- The Parachutes
- (Belgium) The Sedan Vault
- The Sunchild
- Trip Fontaine
- (United Kingdom) Verses
- Vitja
- (Germany) We Butter the Bread with Butter
- (United States) We Came as Romans
- We Set the Sun
- (Italy) Your Hero

=== Redfield Digital ===
==== Currently signed ====
- (Japan) Abstracts
- As We Go
- Blessed With Rage
- Burning Down Alaska
- Defy Your Dreams
- (Switzerland) Final Story
- From What We Believe
- Keep It For Tomorrow
- Malcolm Rivers
- Ocean of Plague
- (Japan) Sever Black Paranoia
- (Hungary) Shell Beach
- (Netherlands) Simon
- Texas Local News
- Via
- (Belgium) Wolves Scream

==== Former bands ====
- (Japan) A Ghost of Flare
- (France) All the Shelters
- (Greece) Bring Back Persephone
- Flash Forward
- Forever Ends Today
- (Netherlands) For I Am King
- (South Africa) Freedom for Your Life
- The Grandtry
- (Israel) Kids Insane
- Lasting Traces
- (United Kingdom) Mireau
- (Finland) New Deadline
- (Latvia) Rise of the Bait
- (Sweden) Seventribe
- (Italy) Shake Well Before
- (Czech Republic) Skywalker
- (United Kingdom) Surrender the Coast
- Swallow Your Pride
- (Liechtenstein) Taped
- (Italy) Wrong Way to Die
- (Turkey) You May Kiss the Bride

=== Disbanded ===
- (Canada) Abandon All Ships
- (Germany) Alazka
- (Germany) Breathe Atlantis
- (United States) Diatribe
- (Germany) His Statue Falls
- (United Kingdom) Lower Than Atlantis
- (Denmark) Scarred by Beauty

== Distributors (list) ==
- (Germany) (Austria) AL!VE AG
- (Switzerland) Max Music
- (Belgium) (Netherlands) (Luxembourg) Suburban
- (United Kingdom) Storm Warning Entertainment/Code 7 Music/Plastic Head Distribution
- (France) Sugar & Spice
- (France) Soundworks
- (United States) Interpunk
- CR Japan
- (Estonia) Rockoff
- (Finland) Supersounds
- (Greece) Spicy Music
- (Poland) Mystic Production
- (Poland) Fiomusica
- (Russia) Impexcom
- (Sweden) Sound Pollution
- (Italy) Audioglobe
- (Hungary) Indiego
