= Within Temptation discography =

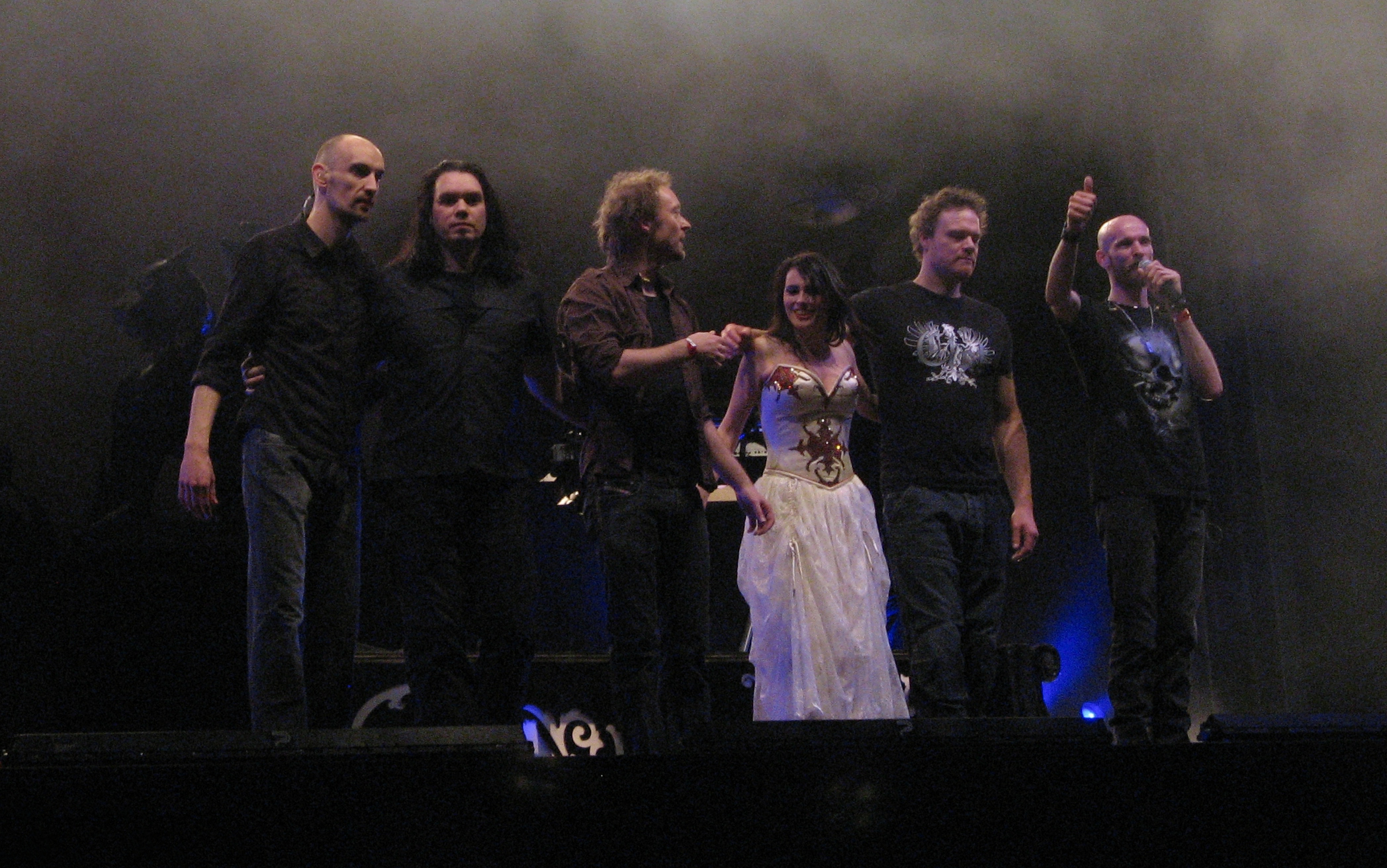
- Within Temptation live at the Bevrijdings Festival, 2008
- Studio albums: 8
- Extended plays: 6
- Live albums: 5
- Compilation albums: 1
- Singles: 26
- Video albums: 4
- Music videos: 32

Dutch symphonic metal band Within Temptation have released eight studio albums, five live albums, four extended plays and 26 singles.

== Albums ==
=== Studio albums ===
List of albums, with selected chart positions and certifications
Title	Details	Peak chart positions											Sales	Certifications
Title	Details	NLD	AUS	AUT	BEL	FIN	FRA	GER	SWE	SWI	UK	US	Sales	Certifications
Enter	Released: 6 April 1997; Label: DSFA; Formats: CD, LP, cassette	32	—	—	—	—	—	—	—	—	—	—		
Mother Earth	Released: 24 December 2000; Label: DSFA; Formats: CD, LP, cassette	3	—	30	3	—	—	7	—	70	106	—	GER: 200,000; NLD: 160,000; EU: 350,000	BEA: Gold; BVMI: Platinum; NVPI: 2× Platinum
The Silent Force	Released: 15 November 2004; Label: GUN; Formats: CD, LP, digital download	1	—	12	4	3	34	5	28	22	90	—	GER: 200,000; FIN: 18,824; NLD: 160,000; EU: 650,000; UK: 60,000	BEA: Gold; BPI: Silver; BVMI: Platinum; IFPI FIN: Gold; IFPI SWI: Gold; NVPI: 2× Platinum
The Heart of Everything	Released: 24 July 2007; Label: Roadrunner; Formats: CD, LP, digital download	1	88	12	2	2	26	5	4	8	38	106	FIN: 13,291; GER: 100,000; NLD: 35,000; UK: 60,000; US: 7,000	BEA: Gold; BPI: Silver; BVMI: Gold; NFPF: Gold; NVPI: Gold
The Unforgiving	Released: 29 March 2011; Label: Roadrunner; Formats: CD, LP, digital download	2	27	7	3	3	19	7	7	9	23	50	GER: 100,000; POL: 10,000; POR: 20,000; US: 15,000	AFP: Platinum; BPI: Silver; BVMI: Gold; ZPAV: Gold
Hydra	Released: 4 February 2014; Label: Nuclear Blast; Formats: CD, digital download, LP	1	26	5	4	2	13	4	12	2	6	16	US: 21,000	
Resist	Released: 1 February 2019; Label: Vertigo; Formats: CD, LP, digital download	2	13	4	2	4	22	1	11	2	15	129	US: 10,000; FRA: 2,900	
Bleed Out	Released: 20 October 2023; Label: Force Music; Formats: CD, LP, digital download	2	—	8	5	18	43	5	52	4	69	—		
"—" denotes album that did not chart or was not released

=== Live albums ===
Title	Details	Peak chart positions							
Title	Details	NLD	AUT	BEL	FIN	FRA	GER	SWI	UK
Black Symphony	Released: 22 September 2008; Label: Roadrunner, GUN; Formats: CD, digital download, 3LP	3	36	16	32	77	17	25	—
An Acoustic Night at the Theatre	Released: 2 November 2009; Label: Roadrunner, GUN; Formats: CD, digital download, vinyl	4	38	31	—	89	46	35	116
Let Us Burn – Elements & Hydra Live in Concert	Released: 14 November 2014; Label: BMG; Formats: CD, digital download	5	75	53	—	66	26	—	—
Mother Earth Tour (Note: Previously released as a video album.)	Released: 28 April 2023; Recorded: 29 June – 25 August 2002; Label: Music on Vinyl; Formats: CD, 2×LP, streaming, digital download	79	—	—	—	—	—	—	—
The Silent Force Tour (Note: Previously released as a video album.)	Released: 28 April 2023; Recorded: 22 July 2005; Label: Music on Vinyl; Formats: 2×CD, 2×LP, streaming, digital download	66	—	—	—	—	—	—	—
Worlds Collide Tour – Live in Amsterdam	Released: 21 June 2024; Recorded: 29 November 2022; Label: Force Music, Music on Vinyl; Formats: CD, vinyl	13	—	114	—	—	25	80	—
"—" denotes album that did not chart or was not released

=== Compilation albums ===
Title	Details	Peak chart positions	
Title	Details	NLD	BEL
The Q-Music Sessions	Release: 19 April 2013 (Only in the Netherlands and Belgium); Label: Sony BMG; Formats: CD, digital download	5	4

== Extended plays ==
Title	EP details	Peak chart positions				
Title	EP details	NLD	FRA	GER	SWI	US
The Dance	Released: 21 June 1998; Label: DSFA; Formats: CD, cassette, LP	—	—	—	—	—
The Howling	Released: 1 May 2007; Label: Roadrunner; Formats: CD, digital download	—	—	—	—	—
Sinéad, the Remixes	Released: 17 October 2011; Label: Armada Music; Formats: Digital download	—	—	—	—	—
Paradise (What About Us?)	Released: 27 September 2013; Label: Sony BMG, Nuclear Blast; Formats: Digital download	80	160	81	64	196
And We Run	Released: 23 May 2014; Label: Sony BMG, Nuclear Blast; Formats: Digital download	—	—	—	—	—
The Purge	Released: 20 November 2020; Label: Force Music Recordings; Formats: Digital download	—	—	—	—	—
Shed My Skin	Released: 25 June 2021; Label: Force Music Recordings; Formats: Digital download	—	—	—	—	—
Don't Pray for Me	Released: 8 July 2022; Label: Force Music Recordings; Formats: Digital download	—	—	—	—	—
The Aftermath	Released: 25 November 2022; Label: Music On Vinyl; Formats: 12" LP, Picture Disc	—	—	—	—	—
Wireless	Released: 19 May 2023; Label: Force Music Recordings; Formats: Digital download	—	—	—	—	—
Bleed Out	Released: 18 August 2023; Label: Force Music Recordings; Formats: Digital download	—	—	—	—	—
Ritual	Released: 29 September 2023; Label: Force Music Recordings; Formats: Digital download	—	—	—	—	—
"—" denotes album that did not chart or was not released

== Singles ==
=== 1990s–2000s ===
List of singles, with selected chart positions, showing year released and album name
Single	Year	Peak chart positions										Album
Single	Year	NLD	AUT	BEL	FIN	FRA	GER	NOR	SWE	SWI	UK	Album
"Restless"	1997	—	—	—	—	—	—	—	—	—	—	Enter
"Our Farewell"	2001	—	—	—	—	—	—	—	—	—	—	Mother Earth
"Ice Queen"	2001	2	53	3	—	—	21	—	—	—	—	Mother Earth
"Mother Earth"	2002	15	—	33	—	—	14	—	—	81	—	Mother Earth
"Running Up that Hill"	2003	7	37	48	—	—	13	—	—	83	—	Non-album single
"Stand My Ground"	2004	5	25	9	9	—	13	20	21	67	—	The Silent Force
"Memories"	2005	18	44	26	19	—	17	—	—	45	—	The Silent Force
"Angels"	2005	8	50	41	9	—	25	—	—	—	—	The Silent Force
"What Have You Done" (featuring Keith Caputo)	2007	7	49	49	4	—	32	—	40	36	187	The Heart of Everything
"Frozen"	2007	11	—	—	—	78	64	—	—	—	—	The Heart of Everything
"All I Need"	2007	13	—	—	—	—	78	—	—	—	— (Note: "All I Need" did not enter the UK Singles Chart, but peaked at number 37 on the UK Rock & Metal Singles Chart.)	The Heart of Everything
"Forgiven"	2008	9	—	—	—	—	87	—	—	—	—	The Heart of Everything
"Utopia" (featuring Chris Jones)	2009	52	—	37	—	—	—	—	—	88	—	An Acoustic Night at the Theatre
"—" denotes single that did not chart or was not released

=== 2010s ===
List of singles, with selected chart positions, showing year released and album name
Single	Year	Peak chart positions								Album
Single	Year	NLD	AUT	BEL	FIN	FRA	GER	SWI	UK	Album
"Faster"	2011	11	—	32	—	—	48	—	— (Note: "Faster" did not enter the UK Singles Chart, but peaked at number 6 on the UK Rock & Metal Singles Chart.)	The Unforgiving
"Sinéad"	2011	(Note: "Sinéad" did not enter the Dutch Top 40, but peaked at number 15 on the Dutch Tipparade.)	37	61	—	—	64	—	—	The Unforgiving
"Shot in the Dark"	2011	(Note: "Shot in the Dark" did not enter the Dutch Top 40, but peaked at number 13 on the Dutch Tipparade.)	—	60	—	—	—	—	—	The Unforgiving
"Paradise (What About Us?)" (featuring Tarja Turunen)	2013	80	—	—	(Note: "Paradise (What About Us?)" did not enter the Finnish Singles Chart, but peaked at number 13 on the Finnish Download Charts.)	160	81	64	— (Note: "Paradise (What About Us?)" did not enter the UK Singles Chart, but peaked at number 6 on the UK Rock & Metal Singles Chart.)	Hydra
"Dangerous" (featuring Howard Jones)	2013	—	—	—	—	—	—	—	—	Hydra
"Whole World Is Watching" (featuring Dave Pirner of Soul Asylum) and (featuring Piotr Rogucki of Coma) (Poland)	2014	—	—	59	—	—	—	—	— (Note: "Whole World Is Watching" did not enter the UK Singles Chart, but peaked at number 34 on the UK Rock & Metal Singles Chart.)	Hydra
"And We Run" (featuring Xzibit)	2014	—	—	—	—	—	—	—	—	Hydra
"The Reckoning" (featuring Jacoby Shaddix of Papa Roach)	2018	—	—	—	(Note: "The Reckoning" did not enter the Finnish Singles Chart, but peaked at number 85 on the Finnish Airplay Chart.)	—	—	—	—	Resist
"Raise Your Banner" (featuring Anders Fridén of In Flames)	2018	—	—	—	—	—	—	—	—	Resist
"Firelight" (featuring Jasper Steverlinck of Arid)	2018	—	—	85	—	—	—	—	—	Resist
"In Vain"	2019	—	—	(Note: "In Vain" did not enter the Ultratop 50, but charted at the Ultratip Bubbling Under.)	(Note: "In Vain" did not enter the Finnish Singles Chart, but peaked at number 66 on the Finnish Airplay Chart.)	—	—	—	—	Resist
"—" denotes single that did not chart or was not released

=== 2020s ===
List of singles, with selected chart positions, showing year released and album name
Single	Year	Peak chart positions				Album
Single	Year	BEL (FL)	FIN	GER	UK	Album
"Entertain You"	2020	(Note: "Entertain You" did not enter the Ultratop 50, but charted at the Ultratip Bubbling Under.)	(Note: "Entertain You" did not enter the Finnish Singles Chart, but peaked at number 61 on the Finnish Airplay Chart.)	—	(Note: "Entertain You" did not enter the UK Singles Chart, but peaked at number 76 on the Uk Singles Sales Chart and 75 on the UK Singles Downloads Chart.)	Bleed Out
"The Purge"	2020	(Note: "The Purge" did not enter the Ultratop 50, but charted at the Ultratip Bubbling Under.)	—	—	(Note: "The Purge" did not enter the UK Singles Chart, but peaked at number 76 on the UK Singles Sales Chart and 73 on the UK Singles Downloads Chart.)	Bleed Out
"Shed My Skin" (featuring Annisokay)	2021	—	—	—	—	Bleed Out
"Forsaken (The Aftermath)"	2021	—	—	—	—	Non-album single
"Don't Pray for Me"	2022	—	—	—	—	Bleed Out
"The Fire Within"	2022	—	—	—	—	Non-album single
"Wireless"	2023	—	—	(Note: "Wireless" did not enter the Official German Charts, but peaked at number 92 on the Germany Download Singles Chart.)	—	Bleed Out
"Bleed Out"	2023	—	—	—	(Note: "Bleed Out" did not enter the UK Singles Chart, but peaked at number 98 on the UK Singles Sales Chart and 92 on the UK Singles Downloads Chart.)	Bleed Out
"Ritual"	2023	—	(Note: "Ritual" did not enter the Finnish Singles Chart, but peaked at number 56 on the Finnish Airplay Chart.)	(Note: "Ritual" did not enter the Official German Charts, but peaked at number 48 on the Germany Download Albums Charts.)	(Note: "Ritual" did not enter the UK Singles Chart, but peaked at number 74 on the UK Singles Sales Chart and 69 on the UK Singles Downloads Chart.)	Bleed Out
"A Fool's Parade" (featuring Alex Yarmak)	2024	—	—	—	—	Non-album singles
"Sing Like a Siren" (featuring Jerry Heil)	2025	—	—	—	—	Non-album singles
"Somebody Like You" (with Smash Into Pieces)	2026	38	—	—	—	Non-album singles
"Through Fire & Ashes" (featuring S10)	2026	—	—	—	—	Non-album singles
"—" denotes single that did not chart or was not released

=== As featured artist ===
List of singles, with selected chart positions, showing year released and album name
Title	Year	Peak chart positions	Album
Title	Year	US Main. Rock	Album
"Faded Out" (with Asking Alexandria)	2022	14	See What's on the Inside
"Labyrinth" (with BLIND8)	2024	—	TBA
"Light Can Only Shine in the Darkness" (with Lord of the Lost)	2025	—	OPVS NOIR Vol. 1

=== Promotional singles ===
Single	Year	Peak chart positions		Album
Single	Year	NLD	BEL	Album
"Never-ending Story"	2003	—	—	Mother Earth
"Jillian (I'd Give My Heart)"	2005	(Note: "Jillian" did not enter the Dutch Top 40, but peaked at number 9 on the Dutch Tipparade.)	—	The Silent Force
"Where Is the Edge"	2010	—	—	The Unforgiving
"Fire and Ice"	2010	—	—	The Unforgiving
"Crazy"	2012	100	—	The Q-Music Sessions
"Grenade"	2012	73	—	The Q-Music Sessions
"Edge of the World"	2014	—	—	Hydra
"Supernova"	2019	—	(Note: "Supernova" did not enter the Ultratop 50, but charted at the Ultratip Bubbling Under.)	Resist
"Mad World"	2019	—	—	Resist

== Other appearances ==
Year	Title	Type	Song
2004	Knights of the Temple: Infernal Crusade	Video game	"Mother Earth"
2007	Blood and Chocolate	Film trailer	"Stand My Ground"
2008	Grey's Anatomy	TV series promo	"What Have You Done"
2008	The Chronicles of Spellborn	Computer game	"The Howling"
2008	The Chronicles of Spellborn	Computer game	"Sounds of Freedom"
2009	Guitar Hero World Tour	Video Game: European Track Pack 04	"What Have You Done"
2009	The Tudors	TV series promo	"The Truth Beneath The Rose"
2010	The Vampire Diaries	TV series episode: "Miss Mystic Falls"	"All I Need"
2010	Me & Mr. Jones	Film trailer	"Where Is the Edge"
2010	The Borgias	TV series: Season 1 trailer	"Jillian (I'd Give My Heart)"
2012	Isabel	TV series promo	"The Truth Beneath The Rose"
2020	WWE SmackDown	TV episode: The Undertaker's legacy special tribute	"The Reckoning"
