= Worlds Collide Tour – Live in Amsterdam =

Video by Within Temptation
- Released: 21 June 2024
- Recorded: 30 November 2022
- Venue: Ziggo Dome (Amsterdam)
- Length: 70:36 (live album); 14:00 (Artone Sessions)
- Label: Force Music
- Director: Hans Pannecoucke
- Producer: Within Temptation

Within Temptation video chronology
Let Us Burn – Elements & Hydra Live in Concert (2014)	Worlds Collide Tour – Live in Amsterdam (2024)

Within Temptation chronology
Bleed Out (2023)	Worlds Collide Tour – Live in Amsterdam (2024)

Worlds Collide Tour – Live in Amsterdam (or simply Worlds Collide Tour) is the fifth video album and sixth live album by Dutch symphonic metal band Within Temptation. It was released on 21 June 2024 on vinyl, CD, Blu-Ray, DVD and in a special 64-page hardcover artbook. The concert was recorded as part of the homonymous tour on 29 November 2022 at the Ziggo Dome, in Amsterdam. In order to promote the release, the live version of "The Reckoning" was released on 24 May 2024.

== Track listing ==
Concert setlist
No.	Title	Length
1.	"Our Solemn Hour"	5:39
2.	"Faster"	4:30
3.	"Paradise (What About Us?)"	5:25
4.	"Stand My Ground"	5:00
5.	"Angels"	4:12
6.	"Iron"	6:07
7.	"Raise Your Banner"	5:40
8.	"Entertain You"	3:32
9.	"The Reckoning" (featuring Amy Lee)	5:22
10.	"Supernova"	5:36
11.	"Don't Pray for Me"	3:42
12.	"All I Need"	5:04
13.	"Ice Queen"	5:08
14.	"Mother Earth"	5:39

The Artone Sessions Limited Bonus CD
No.	Title	Length
1.	"Ritual" (acoustic)	3:30
2.	"We Go to War" (acoustic)	3:53
3.	"Bleed Out" (acoustic)	3:14
4.	"Faster" (acoustic)	3:23

== Personnel ==
=== Within Temptation ===
- Sharon den Adel – vocals
- Ruud Jolie – lead guitar
- Stefan Helleblad – rhythm guitar, backing vocals
- Martijn Spierenburg – keyboards
- Jeroen van Veen – bass guitar
- Mike Coolen – drums

=== Special guests ===
- Amy Lee – featured vocals on "The Reckoning"

== Charts ==
Chart performance for Worlds Collide Tour – Live in Amsterdam
Chart (2024)	Peak position
Belgian Albums (Ultratop Flanders)	114
Dutch Albums (Album Top 100)	13
German Albums (Offizielle Top 100)	25
Swiss Albums (Schweizer Hitparade)	80
UK Album Downloads (OCC)	89

== Release history ==
Release history and formats for Worlds Collide Tour - Live in Amsterdam
Region	Date	Format	Label	Ref.
Various	21 June 2024	Box set; Blu-ray; DVD; CD; streaming	Force Music	
Various	21 June 2024	Vinyl	Music on Vinyl	
