= Bleed Out Tour =

2024–25 concert tour by Within Temptation

- Tour by Within Temptation
- Poster with the 2024 tour dates
- Location: Australia; Europe; South America
- Associated album: Bleed Out
- Start date: 19 April 2024
- End date: 16 August 2025
- Legs: 3
- Supporting acts: annisokay; Green Lizard; Blind8

Within Temptation concert chronology
- Worlds Collide (2022); Bleed Out Tour (2024–2025)

The Bleed Out Tour was a concert tour by the Dutch symphonic metal band Within Temptation, in support of their eighth studio album, Bleed Out, which was released on 20 October 2023. The tour was announced on 4 October 2023, and included a first leg in Latin America in April 2024 and a second leg in Europe and in the United Kingdom, which commenced on 21 September in Tilburg and concluded on 6 December 2024 in Amsterdam. It is the last tour to feature Martijn Spierenburg on keyboards before his departure from the band.

The tour featured singers Tarja Turunen and Alex Yarmak as special guests at selected dates. Supporting acts were annisokay, Green Lizard, and Blind8.

== Background ==
After touring for promoting their seventh studio, Resist, Within Temptation were scheduled to embark on the co-headlining Worlds Collide with Evanescence in March and April 2020 and to perform a row of summer festivals later that year. At that time, the band already had plans for a new studio album, and were also planning on entering the studio soon. However, due to the COVID-19 pandemic, all plans shifted. The co-headlining tour was postponed several times until it could finally happen in 2022, and the remaining festival concerts had to be canceled. It impacted the plans for a full-length studio album as well and, combined with a new marketing strategy for releasing new music, the band opted to start releasing a series of stand-alone singles during the pandemic.

As the pandemic safety measures started to get lifted in some countries and live concerts were being gradually allowed to happen, the band started to perform live again. Between 2021 and 2023, they played at summer festivals, toured as an opening act for Iron Maiden in their Legacy of the Beast World Tour, and concluded the tour with Evanescence. The band performed all of the recently released singles during that period, but did not officially do so as a means of promoting a new album, as it was not finished at that time.

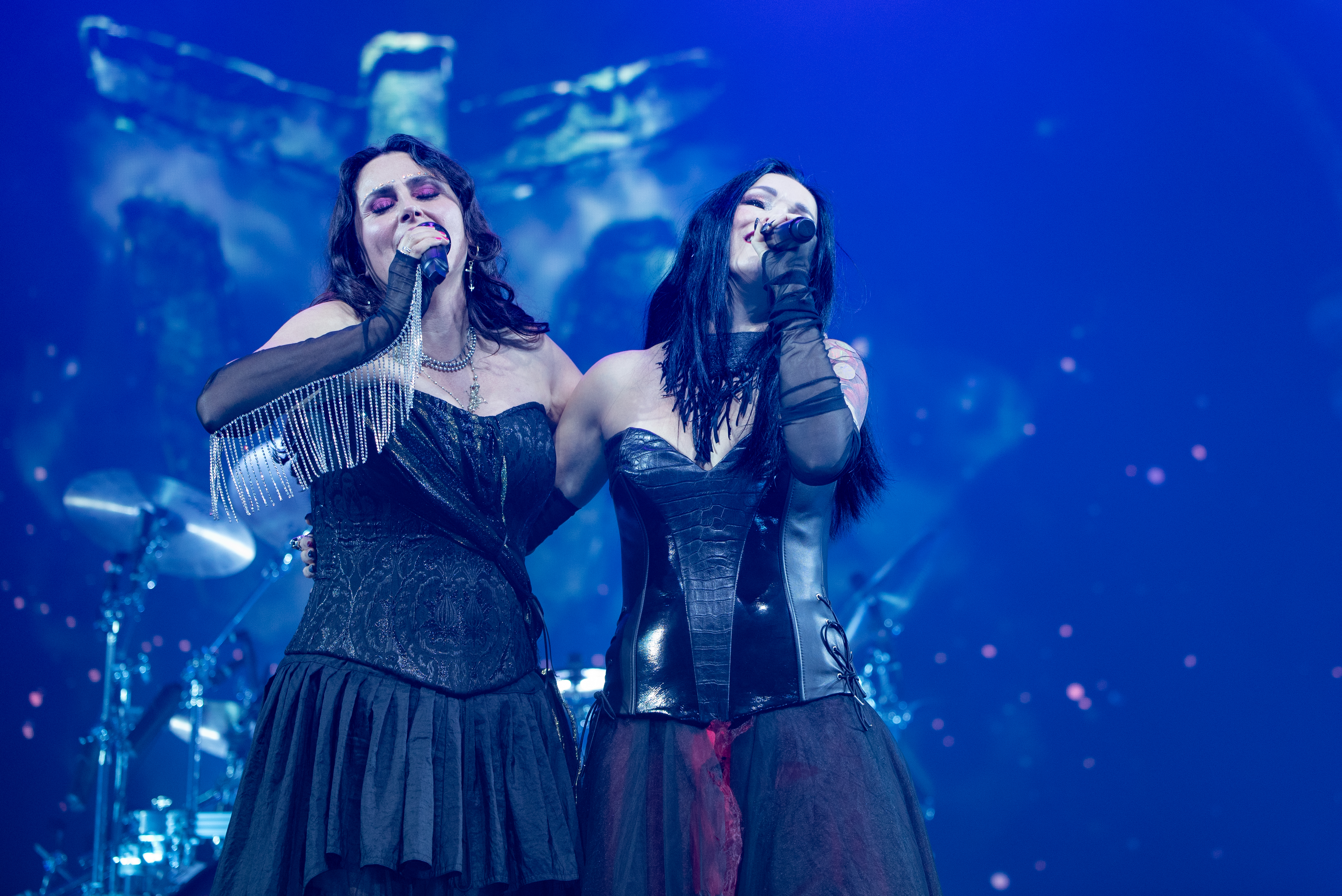
Sharon den Adel performing alongside guest vocalist Tarja Turunen in Barcelona.

The group's eighth studio album, Bleed Out, was announced on 18 August 2023. On 4 October, a few weeks prior to the album release date, a European tour for supporting the record was then announced, with concerts scheduled to happen from October to December 2024. Ticket sales for the European leg began on 6 October 2023 at 9am.

Prior to the European leg, the tour visited Latin America in April 2024 for selected festivals and one solo concert in Mexico. Besides the Latin American dates, the band decided not to play in any more festivals until the European arena leg of the tour. Since the announcement, extra concerts were added in Antwerp and Lisbon, and the concert in Oslo had its venue changed due to high selling tickets.

The concept of the tour and its stage setting and decoration started being planned in the beginning of 2024 by the band themselves. In an interview for Metal Hammer, lead vocalist Sharon den Adel, who has a bachelor degree in fashion design, commented that she was developing costumes for the tour alongside a Dutch company who utilizes certain species of mushrooms for making biodegradable clothing.

== Critical reception ==
Critic Sofia Bergstrom from Swedish newspaper Aftonbladet praised the concert in Stockholm. In her four star review, she commended Within Temptation's stage presence, the openness in which the band addressed current topics throughout the songs that comprised the set list, and the duets between lead vocalist Sharon den Adel and guest vocalist Tarja Turunen. Reviewing the concert in Leeds, critic Jon Davis from The Yorkshire Post praised den Adel's vocal performance and commented that Within Temptation "still have one of the best voices in rock, and put it to terrific use".

== Set list ==
The following set list was performed on 24 April 2024 in Mexico City, Mexico, and is not intended to represent a majority of the performances throughout the tour.

1. "The Reckoning"
2. "Faster"
3. "Bleed Out"
4. "Paradise (What About Us?)"
5. "Angels"
6. "Raise Your Banner"
7. "Wireless"
8. "Entertain You"
9. "Stand My Ground"
10. "Supernova"
11. "In the Middle of the Night"
12. "All I Need"
13. "Our Solemn Hour"
14. "Don't Pray for Me"
15. "The Cross"
16. "Mad World"
17. "What Have You Done"
18. "Never-ending Story" (acoustic)
19. "Ice Queen" (acoustic)
20. "Mother Earth"

On dates with Tarja Turunen as the guest singer, she would join Sharon den Adel to perform "Paradise (What About Us?)", "The Promise", and "I Feel Immortal".

== Tour dates ==
List of 2024 concerts
Date	City	Country	Venue
19 April 2024	Quito	Ecuador	The Metal Fest Ecuador 2024
21 April 2024	Santiago	Chile	The Metal Fest Chile 2024
24 April 2024	Mexico City	Mexico	Auditorio BB
27 April 2024	São Paulo	Brazil	Summer Breeze Open Air Brazil
21 September 2024	Tilburg	Netherlands	013
22 September 2024	Groningen	Netherlands	De Oosterpoort
4 October 2024	Antwerp	Belgium	Lotto Arena
5 October 2024	Antwerp	Belgium	Lotto Arena
6 October 2024	Cologne	Germany	Palladium
8 October 2024	Oslo	Norway	Oslo Spektrum
9 October 2024	Stockholm	Sweden	Annexet
11 October 2024	Helsinki	Finland	Helsinki Ice Hall
12 October 2024	Tallinn	Estonia	Unibet Arena
14 October 2024	Berlin	Germany	Velodrom
15 October 2024	Hamburg	Germany	Alsterdorfer Sporthalle
16 October 2024	Leipzig	Germany	Haus Auensee
18 October 2024	Budapest	Hungary	Barba Negra
19 October 2024	Munich	Germany	Zenith
21 October 2024	Vienna	Austria	Gasometer
23 October 2024	Frankfurt	Germany	Jahrhunderthalle
24 October 2024	Prague	Czech Republic	Sportovní hala Fortuna
25 October 2024	Łódź	Poland	Atlas Arena
27 October 2024	Copenhagen	Denmark	Falkoner Salen
15 November 2024	Cardiff	Wales	Cardiff International Arena
16 November 2024	London	England	Wembley Arena
18 November 2024	Nottingham	England	Motorpoint Arena Nottingham
19 November 2024	Leeds	England	First Direct Arena
21 November 2024	Paris	France	Porte de La Chapelle Arena
23 November 2024	Barcelona	Spain	Palau Sant Jordi
24 November 2024	Madrid	Spain	Palacio Vistalegre
25 November 2024	Lisbon	Portugal	Altice Arena
26 November 2024	Lisbon	Portugal	Altice Arena
28 November 2024	Toulouse	France	Le Zénith
29 November 2024	Grenoble	France	Summum
1 December 2024	Milan	Italy	Alcatraz
2 December 2024	Zürich	Switzerland	The Hall
3 December 2024	Stuttgart	Germany	Porsche-Arena
5 December 2024	Esch-sur-Alzette	Luxembourg	Rockhal
6 December 2024	Amsterdam	Netherlands	Ziggo Dome

List of 2025 concerts
Date	City	Country	Venue
28 February 2025	Melbourne	Australia	Knotfest Australia
3 March 2025	Brisbane	Australia	Princess Theatre
6 March 2025	Melbourne	Australia	Max Watts
31 May 2025	Hulst	Netherlands	Vestrock
4 June 2025	Sölvesborg	Sweden	Sweden Rock Festival
6 June 2025	Plzeň	Czech Republic	Metalfest
13 June 2025	Leicestershire	England	Download Festival
20 June 2025	Clisson	France	Hellfest Festival
27 June 2025	Oslo	Norway	Tons of Rock
28 June 2025	Grenchen	Switzerland	Summerside
12 July 2025	Zottegem	Belgium	Rock Zottegem
18 July 2025	Lokalahti	Finland	Karjurock
19 July 2025	Peurunka	Finland	John Smith Rock Festival
31 July 2025	Braşov	Romania	Rockstadt Extreme Fest
2 August 2025	Wacken	Germany	Wacken Open Air
8 August 2025	Villena	Spain	Leyendas del Rock
16 August 2025	Eindhoven	Netherlands	Dynamo Open Air

== Personnel ==
=== Within Temptation ===
- Sharon den Adel – vocals
- Ruud Jolie – lead guitar
- Stefan Helleblad – rhythm guitar, backing vocals
- Martijn Spierenburg – keyboards (2024)
- Jeroen van Veen – bass guitar
- Mike Coolen – drums
- Vikram Shankar – keyboards (2025)

=== Guest musicians ===
- Christoph Wieczorek – vocals and guitars on "Shed my Skin" at selected dates
- Alex Yarmak – vocals on "A Fool's Parade" and "What Have You Done" at selected dates
- Tarja Turunen – vocals on "Paradise (What About Us?)", "I Feel Immortal", and "The Promise" at selected dates
- Martijn Westerholt – keyboards (8 August 2025)
