= Ritual (Within Temptation song) =

Single from Dutch symphonic metal and rock band Within Temptation

Single by Within Temptation

from the album Bleed Out
- Released: 29 September 2023
- Length: 3:36
- Label: Force Music Recordings
- Songwriters: Daniel Gibson; Robert Westerholt; Sharon den Adel
- Producers: Daniel Gibson; Mathijs Tieken; Within Temptation

Within Temptation singles chronology
| "Bleed Out" (2023) | "Ritual" (2023) | "A Fool's Parade" (2024) |

Music video
- "Ritual" on YouTube

"Ritual" is a song recorded by Dutch symphonic metal band Within Temptation. It was released worldwide as a single on 29 September 2023 via digital download and streaming to promote their eight studio album, Bleed Out, and as part of an EP containing all the previous independent singles released by the band that also comprised the album. A limited edition of 666 individually numbered copies was also released on vinyl. The song was produced by their long-time producer Daniel Gibson, with Mathijs Tieken and Within Temptation serving as additional producers.

== Background ==
The song "Ritual" was originally conceived years before the release of Within Temptation's eight studio album, Bleed Out. A first version of the track had already been recorded during the production of their seventh studio album, Resist. However, at that time, the band did not considered it to be a good fit that record. The song was also considered by lead vocalist Sharon den Adel to be released as a part of her solo project, My Indigo, but she did not find it to match the project musically as well, and the track was shelved for a few years. The band later decided to re-work the song. They took inspiration from Type O Negative and made the guitars and bass lines heavier. As a result, the song ended up fitting the main musical ambiance and thematic line of Bleed Out, so it was added to its final tracklist. For promoting the album, it was released as a single on 29 September 2023.

== Music video ==
An official music video for "Ritual" was released on 24 October 2023. It features a horror movie inspiration, and focuses on women getting revenge on men who were abusive to them in several different scenarios, such as their workplace, sports, and the streets.

Just like the two previous music videos, "Wireless" and "Bleed Out", the band made use of artificial intelligence for the final result. However, the video was not fully created through the use of that technology. Firstly, there was a traditional studio shooting with the whole band, a filming crew, a director, and an artificial intelligence supervisor in the room. After that, the shots were digitalized and had their style changed and animated through artificial intelligence. A team was responsible for creating digitally the ambiance and style the band had envisioned for the video, so there were a series of active reprograming until the final frames appeared rightly. As it is still an incipient technology, there were still some technical problems, such as adjusting the animated lipsync with the recordings of lead vocalist Sharon den Adel singing, an issue recognized by the band on the final result.

== Track listing ==
Ritual full single standard track listing
| No. | Title | Writer(s) | Length |
|---|---|---|---|
| 1. | "Ritual" | Gibson; Westerholt; den Adel | 3:36 |
| 2. | "Bleed Out" | Gibson; Westerholt; den Adel | 4:30 |
| 3. | "Wireless" | Gibson; Tieken; Westerholt; den Adel | 4:41 |
| 4. | "Don't Pray for Me" | Gibson; Westerholt; den Adel | 3:41 |
| 5. | "Shed My Skin" (featuring Annisokay) | Gibson; Westerholt; den Adel | 4:30 |
| 6. | "The Purge" | Gibson; Westerholt; den Adel | 4:16 |
| 7. | "Entertain You" | Gibson; Tieken; Westerholt; den Adel | 3:31 |
| Total length: | | | 28:00 |

Ritual 7 inch vinyl track listing
| No. | Title | Writer(s) | Length |
|---|---|---|---|
| 1. | "Ritual" | Gibson; Westerholt; den Adel | 3:36 |
| 2. | "Ritual (instrumental)" | Gibson; Westerholt; den Adel | 3:36 |

== Personnel ==
Within Temptation

- Sharon den Adel – lead vocals
- Ruud Jolie – lead guitar
- Stefan Helleblad – rhythm guitar
- Jeroen van Veen – bass
- Martijn Spierenburg – keyboards
- Mike Coolen – drums

Additional personnel

- Christoph Wieczorek – clean vocals (track 5)
- Rudi Schwarzer – harsh vocals (track 5)
- Daniel Gibson – additional vocals (track 7)
- Ted Jensen – mastering
- Zakk Cervini – mixing

== Charts ==
| Chart (2023) | Peak position |
|---|---|
| Czech Republic (Modern Rock) | 3 |
| Finland Airplay (Radiosoittolista) | 56 |
| UK Singles Downloads (OCC) | 69 |
