= Bleed Out (Within Temptation album) =

2023 studio album by Within Temptation

Studio album by Within Temptation
- Released: 20 October 2023
- Recorded: 2020–2023
- Genre: Alternative metal; symphonic metal; gothic metal; pop metal
- Length: 47:10
- Label: Force Music
- Producer: Daniel Gibson; Within Temptation; Mathijs Tieken

Within Temptation chronology
| Resist (2019) | Bleed Out (2023) |

Singles from Bleed Out
- 1. "Entertain You" Released: 8 May 2020; 2. "The Purge" Released: 20 November 2020; 3. "Shed My Skin" Released: 25 June 2021; 4. "Don't Pray for Me" Released: 8 July 2022; 5. "Wireless" Released: 18 May 2023; 6. "Bleed Out" Released: 18 August 2023; 7. "Ritual" Released: 29 September 2023

Bleed Out is the eighth studio album by Dutch symphonic metal band Within Temptation. It was released on 20 October 2023. It is produced by their longtime producer Daniel Gibson, alongside Mathijs Tieken and Within Temptation. The album marks the first time the band opted for releasing a full record without the support of a major record label, and is the final album to feature Martijn Spierenburg on keyboards. Musically, the record incorporates elements from symphonic metal, gothic metal, metalcore, and djent. Lyrically, the band approached themes related to freedom. They addressed subjects such as war, oppression, women's rights, religion, bullying, and inner-struggles.

The album comprised seven singles. Due to a different form of recording and releasing songs, not all singles were initially used for promoting the record itself. The first five were released independently, before the full-length album was announced, and the last two after that. The first single, "Entertain You", was released on 8 May 2020. The second one, "The Purge", was released on 20 November 2020. For promoting their virtual concert The Aftermath, the band released a third independent single, "Shed My Skin", on 25 July 2021, which features German metalcore band Annisokay. The fourth one, "Don't Pray for Me", was released on 8 July 2022. "Wireless" was the fifth independent single, and was released on 18 May 2023. With the official announcement of the album, a sixth single, "Bleed Out", was released on 18 August 2023. "Ritual", the seventh single, was released on 29 September 2023.

Commercially, the album chart entries were concentrated in Europe. Upon release, it peaked at number two in the Netherlands, the group's homecountry, and reached top ten positions in countries such as Belgium, Germany, and Switzerland. The album received generally positive reviews from music critics. Reviewers from Kerrang!, Metal Hammer, and Rock Hard were favorable to the record, speaking positively of new direction the band adopted, the heavier instrumentals, and the more direct and explicit approach on the lyrics. The album won the Edison Award, a Dutch music prize given by the NVPI, in the category Best Rock Album.

== Background ==
The first plans for recording an eighth studio album surfaced a few months after the release of Resist. In June 2019, lead vocalist Sharon den Adel commented that the band would probably be back at the studio in September, after the summer festivals concert season. Later that year, the band entered the studio again to write and record new songs to be featured in a possible upcoming release. In order to break the traditional cycle of writing a full album, promoting it through singles, and then touring, the band also amicably left Vertigo Records, the label which had released their previous album. After that, they opted for going independent as a means to write and release material according to their own preferences.

=== Recording and development ===
Initially, the original plan was to release a stand-alone single in order to promote the Worlds Collide Tour with Evanescence. Scheduled to start in March 2020, the tour had to be postponed four times due to the COVID-19 pandemic and the social distancing rules, until it happened in late 2022. Even so, the band decided to release "Entertain You" during the lockdown period, as the song was already finished. The single was officially announced by the end of April 2020, and subsequently released on 8 May.

During this period, a series of other singles were released as soon as they were recorded, as a way for the band to staying active before the recording of a full album and also of keeping in touch with the fans. According to den Adel, this was a strategy the group had already decided to pursue for the next release before the outbreak of the pandemic, and its occurrence happened to leave the band in a context in which this form of recording and releasing would also fit well. In July 2020, the singer commented during American radio show Full Metal Jackie that the group had two more songs already recorded, as well as some demos. A second single titled, "The Purge", was released on 20 November 2020 along with a music video. On 18 February 2021, den Adel stated that the band were planning on releasing more singles in this independent format, still unaware if that material would be present in a future album or not, as they had other tracks already recorded.

In mid 2021, when concerts were still prohibited due to the social distancing rules, the band recorded a special virtual concert entitled "The Aftermath". A new song, "Shed My Skin", was presented in the concert and also released as a promotional single. It featured the German metalcore band annisokay, who also appeared in the concert and the promotional music video taken from it.

After the decrease of the pandemic and the relaxation of the safety measures, which allowed live concerts to happen again, the band opted to continue with this form of releasing songs as a way of leading up to a next studio album. However, the format of the album was still unclear at that time of the writing process, and den Adel commented that the latest singles would probably not be contained on the full release. The fourth of these then stand-alone singles, "Don't Pray for Me", was announced on 22 June 2022 and released on 8 July. Another single, "The Fire Within", was released on 9 December. This song, however, was originally recorded back in 2019, and then considered an outtake. Its promotional music video featured images captured during the Worlds Collide Tour.

On 18 May 2023, a fifth stand-alone single, "Wireless", was released. During an interview for the British magazine Rock Sound in June 2023, den Adel stated that a new studio album would probably be released before Christmas. On 18 August 2023, the album was announced alongside a sixth single, both called "Bleed Out". With the confirmation of the eighth studio album, it became known that the band opted for maintaining the previously independent singles as a part of the whole release, with the exception of "The Fire Within". According to guitarist Stefan Helleblad, those singles did not have to be mixed again in order to be part of the album, as all the tracks were recorded with the same team and recorders.

Other songs featured on the album that were not released as a stand-alone single, such as "Ritual", were also conceived a few years prior. As the song had not fit the band previous release, Resist, and neither den Adel solo project My Indigo, it was momentarily shelved. After being re-worked, the song ended up fitting the main musical ambiance and thematic line of Bleed Out, so it was added to the final tracklist. However, there were also other songs recorded during that period that did not make the final cut of the album.

== Composition ==
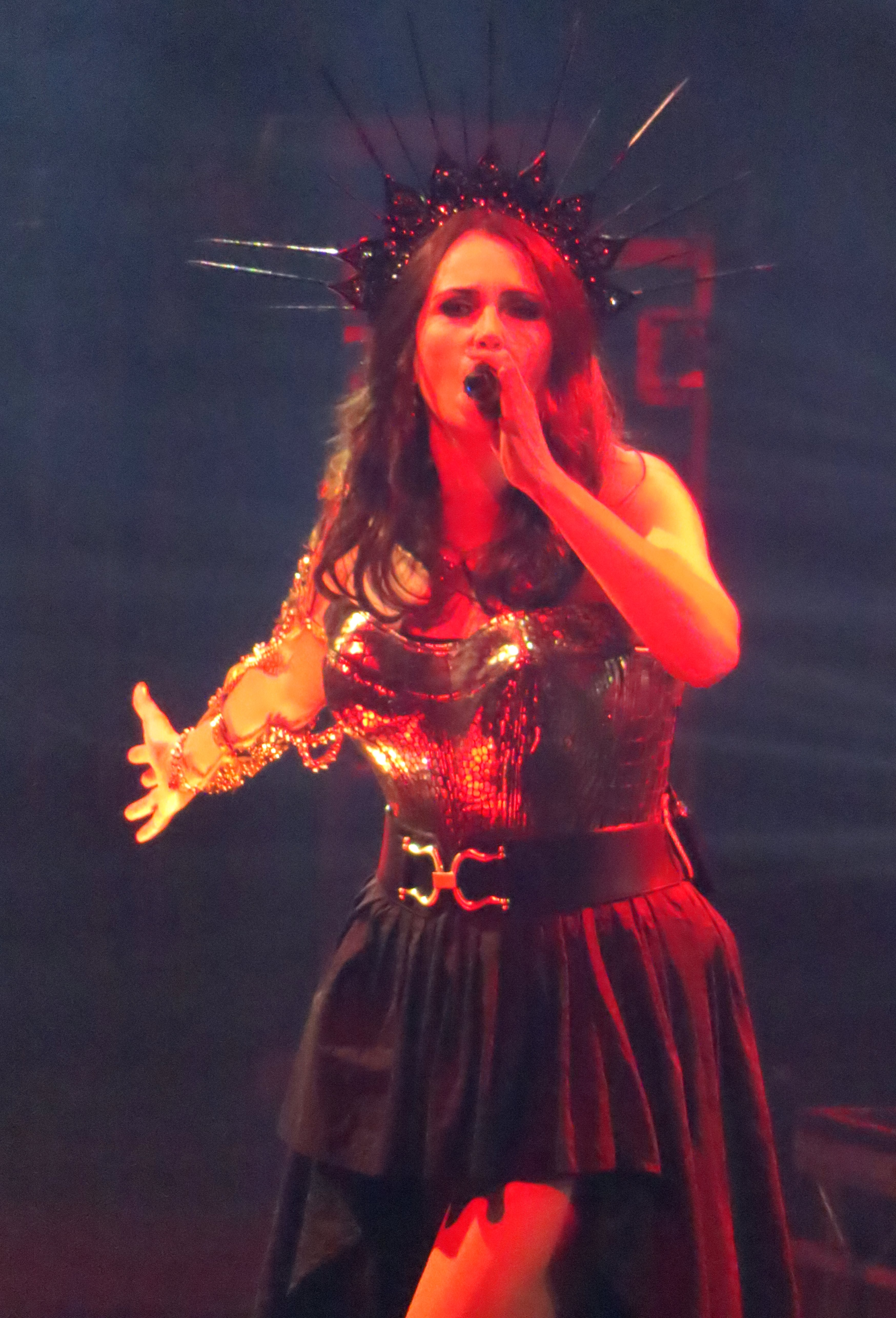
Composition for the album spanned a few years. Some tracks were conceived before the COVID-19 pandemic with the intention of promoting the Worlds Collide Tour, originally scheduled for 2020. In the picture, Sharon den Adel can be seen performing during the tour, which happened in 2022.

At first, the band didn't have a clear musical direction or thematic concept for the whole studio album. One of the advantages of releasing stand-alone singles, according to den Adel, is the possibility of writing a song about something that is happening at one specific moment and not worrying if it would fit on a larger scale release. In July 2020, when being interviewed at the American radio show Full Metal Jackie, the singer commented that the upcoming album would probably be related to subjects related to societal aspects. Some of the stand-alone singles released dealt directly with social issues, such as bullying and prejudice against social outcasts, the death of Mahsa Amini, the forcing of worldviews and religious beliefs, and the 2022 Russian Invasion of Ukraine, while others were related to more personal subjects, such as self-growth. When the album was shaping up to a more concrete form, the band opted for following the theme of "freedom", including the personal, the political, and the societal aspects of it. Den Adel considers the composition process of the album as split in two, as some songs had begun to be developed before the COVID-19 outbreak, and the others after the pandemic hit and other disrupting events took place in the world, affecting her and other band members and moving them to write about it.

For composing the songs, den Adel and Robert Westerholt worked separately. As they are also partners, they preferred not sharing the same working space as well. Therefore, each of them would compose by their own and send their work for their producer, Daniel Gibson, who would mediate the demos and make the bridge between the compositions. The composition process often starts with a vision of what the song would be about. Then, den Adel and Westerholt write separately about it, sometimes already alongside Gibson. After that, as the songs start to become more concrete, vocal lines and guitars are added and a demo is made. Finally, the whole band enters the process and work the song until it reaches its final version.

=== Musical style and influences ===
Bleed Out further develops Within Temptation's preference for experimenting with their sound and incorporating new musical influences on each full-length release. It was described as darker and heavier than some of its predecessors, featuring down-tunes and more guitar riffs. According to den Adel, the nature of the themes addressed had direct influence on the darker tone in the instrumentation of some songs on the album. The singer made less use of operatic influenced vocals, giving space to other singing techniques and also adventuring on lower registers. The album is described as alternative metal, symphonic metal, gothic metal, and pop metal, with elements of metalcore, gothic doom, and djent.

=== Music and lyrics ===
"To protect your freedom, you have to be active. If you're passive, then you're going to lose it. It's about personal freedom, but also freedom for your country, for your friends, family... everything."

— Robert Westerholt telling Metal Hammer about the main inspiration for the album.

According to main lyricists Sharon den Adel and Robert Westerholt, all tracks on the album are somewhat related to the concept of freedom. For writing the songs, they took inspiration in societal issues, as well as their repercutions on the inner lives of people. The depthness and seriousness of the themes addressed led the band to a darker and more melancholic musical approach.

The opening track, "We Go to War", takes inspiration from the 2022 Russian Invasion of Ukraine. It features crystal-clear synths, foreboding choirs, heavy tech-metal riffing, and double-bass drumming. The track was constructed to depict a universe in crisis and describes the devastating effects of war. "Bleed Out" draws inspiration from the death of Mahsa Amini and the protests regarding women's rights in Iran that followed such event. This affected den Adel intimately as she had lived in the Middle East as a child, before moving to other places. The track features a more traditional approach to the group earlier symphonic metal elements, thumping guitar riffs, and emotional and impactful vocals contrasting with the heavy instrumentation. "Wireless" is another song inspired by the war in Ukraine. It addresses war propaganda and the control governments often have over soldiers as a means to send them to war. The track was supposed to be called "Mark of Cain", in reference to Cain and Abel, as a way of alluding to the killing of people from neighbour countries in war. It features electronic music elements intertwined with heavy guitar lines. "Worth Dying For" is instrumentally the fastest track on the album, and also touches on the subject of war. It features symphonic metal and djent elements that recalls Meshuggah, with fast guitar work, a guitar solo, and a skipping rhythm. The song "Ritual" approaches the subject of women having the power to seduce and take initiative in a male-dominated world. It takes inspiration from the movie From Dusk till Dawn. The first version of the track was originally composed before Resist was released, but it was shelved. Then, the band decided to re-work the track, as it would fit Bleed Out thematically and musically. They made the guitars and bass lines heavier, drawing inspiration from Type O Negative. "Cyanide Love" also addresses war in its lyrics. The verse "Sunflowers will soon be growing over your grave" is a reference to a viral video of a Ukrainian woman who offered sunflower seeds to a Russian soldier, so they could grow in his grave after his death. The slower instrumentals contain elements of gothic doom and transmit a sense of dread.

"The Purge" revolves around the themes of redemption, self-reflection, and acknowledging the harm done by one to others and also to themselves. The track is built on a backdrop of synthesizers which focus on den Adel's vocals, and contains electronic music elements used in a manner closer to some of the band's previous releases. "Don't Pray for Me" addresses the act of forcing one's own beliefs onto somebody who does not share them, as well as the struggle people often have to undertake in order to be themselves within certain imposing and restrictive scenarios. Inspiration for writing the song occurred when den Adel was asked by Kerrang! magazine to prepare a special essay for International Women's Day. The singer chose to do research and write on the variation of abortion laws in different countries. As den Adel noted several religious parties trying to enforce their views upon the laws on the topic, she also decided to comment more widely through a song on the act of imposing worldviews onto other people. In an interview for Finnish website Chaoszine, the singer spoke of being moved by the 2022 Oslo shooting as well, a mass shooting targeted at the Oslo LGBT pride event which had happened one day prior to Within Temptation's concert at the Norwegian festival Tons of Rock. The fatality culminated in the pride march being cancelled and the festival security having to be strengthened. The track features mainly gothic metal influences and a dark atmosphere.

The track "Shed My Skin" sees the band venturing within the metalcore subgenre, in combination with their traditional symphonic metal essence. As den Adel had been listening to some metalcore artists, she decided to experiment with the style. After the song was finished, the German band Annisokay was invited to be featured in it, as den Adel considered that they had the quality of transitiong throughout different heavy metal subgerenes without losing their identity. Three different vocalists are present on the song. Besides den Adel's vocals, Annisokay's members Christoph Wieczorek and Rudi Schwarzer provide male clean and harsh vocals, respectively. Lyrically, it discusses the constant changes and adaptions people pass through life. "Unbroken" is another song that dwelves on personal issues. It is also supported by electronic influences. The last track, "Entertain You", was the first one to be recorded and released. Its lyrics point out the bad habit of self-gratification at the expense of others, specially minority groups. It deals with the victimization and exploitation of people who have different characteristics and ways of living. According to den Adel, the way specific groups of people often exclude, mistreat, and harm the ones they call "different" was the main inspiration for the song. The lack of equal rights directed to minority groups was another subject related to the main topic of the song. Writing for Distorted Sound magazine, Issy Harring commented that the track closes the album with an important message also for the alternative communities and subcultures, as it encourages them "to be completely themselves regardless of any ridicule that may be thrown their way".

== Promotion ==
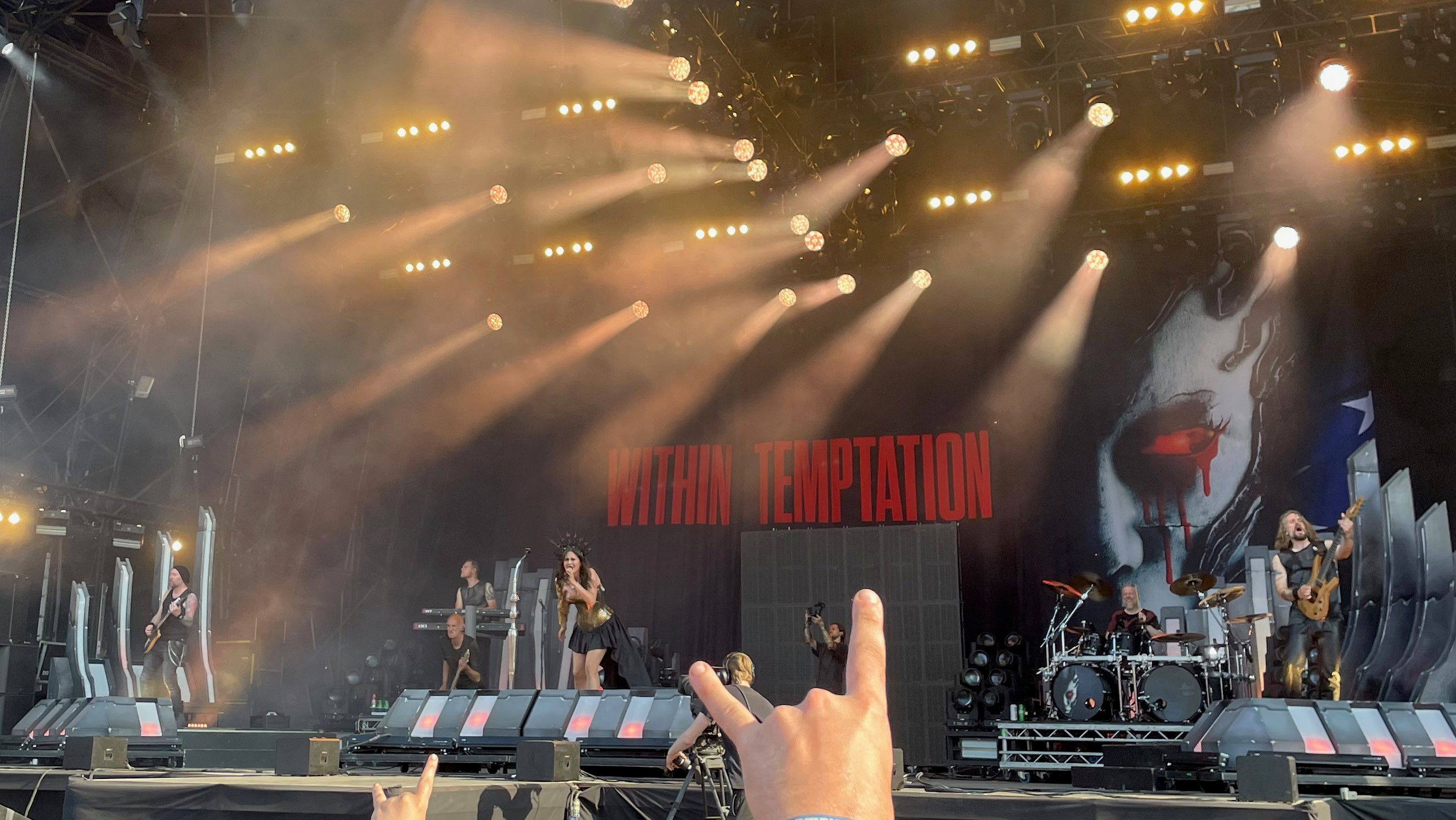
Within Temptation performing at the Download Festival in 2023. Between 2020 and 2023, all stand-alone singles that later were made part of the album were performed live.

As the band decided to release stand-alone singles before having an entire studio album completed, several songs that later were made part of Bleed Out were announced as singles and performed live while the album was still incomplete. "Entertain You", the first single, had its live premiere on Dutch television program M on 22 May 2020. "Shed My Skin" first premiered on The Aftermath, a special virtual concert recorded and streamed by the band in June 2021, during the COVID-19 pandemic. As some countries had already begun to allow concerts with public attendance to happen again, following specific safety measures, Within Temptation played live before an audience for the first time since the start of the pandemic at the Kuopio Rock festival in Finland, in August 2021. In the occasion, they premiered the song "The Purge", which was originally released as a single in November 2020. In 2022, the band played at numerous summer music festivals in Europe, opened for Iron Maiden in their Legacy of the Beast World Tour, and co-headlined the Worlds Collide Tour alongside Evanescence. In those concerts, all of the stand-alone singles released up until then were performed live. During 2023, the band embarked on a new row of concerts during the European festival season, where they debuted live the recently released "Wireless" and the then unreleased "Bleed Out", which premiered at Hellfest.

The first single formally deemed as supporting the album's release was the title song, "Bleed Out", which came out alongside the album's public announcement on 18 August 2023. Another single, "Ritual", was released on 29 September 2023 to promote the album's upcoming release. On October 5, the band went to Dutch television program Humberto to discuss and promote the release, as well as to perform "Wireless".

=== Tour ===
A European arena tour, called the Bleed Out Tour, was announced on 4 October 2023. It is scheduled to happen between October and December 2024. The band also played at selected festivals in Latin America in April 2024, including the Brazilian edition of the Summer Breeze Open Air in São Paulo and The Metal Fest in Chile and Ecuador.

== Reception ==
Professional ratings
Review scores
| Source | Rating |
|---|---|
| Classic Rock | 4/5 stars |
| Distorted Sound | 7/10 |
| Kerrang! | 4/5 stars |
| Metal Hammer | 4.5/5 stars |
| Rock Hard | 8.5/10 |
| de Volkskrant | 4/5 stars |

Bleed Out received positive reviews from music critics. Writing for Metal Hammer, Catherine Morris awarded the album 4.5 stars out of 5. She commended the band's musical evolution throughout their career, and deemed the album as their darkest in terms of music and lyrics. Morris pointed the title track as the best example of the band's current identity, as the song is "fiercely opinionated and passionate, with an impeccable ear for gorgeous melody, rousing choruses and some crushingly heavy metal befitting of their message". Nick Ruskell from Kerrang! also noted the somber tone in the music and lyrics that comprise the album. He commented that, although the band had always discussed worldly issues in their records, they used to do so through the use of metaphors and allegories, whilst in this album they gave societal topics a more direct approach. Regarding the new musical influences adopted by the band, such as implementing more guitar lines and riffs, Ruskell commented that "they can do all this while still sounding unmistakably Within Temptation". Matthieu David from the French Rolling Stone also commented that the group presents balance over the various styles and influences they adopt, which is strengthened by their experience in doing so, and gave the album a score of 3.5 stars out of 5.

=== Accolades ===
| Year | Organization | Award | Result | Ref. |
|---|---|---|---|---|
| 2024 | Edison Award | Best Rock Album | Won | |

=== Year-end lists ===
| Publication | Accolade | Rank | Ref. |
|---|---|---|---|
| Kerrang! | The 50 Best Albums of 2023 | 42 | |
| Metal Hammer | Metal Hammer's 50 best albums of 2023 (Staff) | 34 | |
| Metal Hammer | Metal Hammer's 50 best albums of 2023 (Readers) | 3 | |
| Metal Hammer | Metal Hammer's 10 best alternative metal albums of 2023 | — | |

== Track listing ==
Bleed Out (Standard Edition) track listing
| No. | Title | Writer(s) | Length |
|---|---|---|---|
| 1. | "We Go to War" | Daniel Gibson; Mathijs Tieken; Robert Westerholt; Sharon den Adel | 4:19 |
| 2. | "Bleed Out" | Gibson; Westerholt; den Adel | 4:30 |
| 3. | "Wireless" | Gibson; Tieken; Westerholt; den Adel | 4:41 |
| 4. | "Worth Dying For" | Gibson; Westerholt; den Adel | 4:53 |
| 5. | "Ritual" | Gibson; Westerholt; den Adel | 3:36 |
| 6. | "Cyanide Love" | Gibson; Westerholt; den Adel | 4:04 |
| 7. | "The Purge" | Gibson; Westerholt; den Adel | 4:16 |
| 8. | "Don't Pray for Me" | Gibson; Westerholt; den Adel | 3:41 |
| 9. | "Shed My Skin" (featuring Annisokay) | Gibson; Westerholt; den Adel | 4:30 |
| 10. | "Unbroken" | Gibson; Westerholt; den Adel | 5:08 |
| 11. | "Entertain You" | Gibson; Tieken; Westerholt; den Adel | 3:31 |
| Total length: | | | 47:10 |

Bleed Out (Limited Edition Disc 2) track listing
| No. | Title | Writer(s) | Length |
|---|---|---|---|
| 1. | "We Go to War" (instrumental) | Gibson; Tieken; Westerholt; den Adel | 4:19 |
| 2. | "Bleed Out" (instrumental) | Gibson; Westerholt; den Adel | 4:30 |
| 3. | "Wireless" (instrumental) | Gibson; Tieken; Westerholt; den Adel | 4:41 |
| 4. | "Worth Dying For" (instrumental) | Gibson; Westerholt; den Adel | 4:53 |
| 5. | "Ritual" (instrumental) | Gibson; Westerholt; den Adel | 3:36 |
| 6. | "Cyanide Love" (instrumental) | Gibson; Westerholt; den Adel | 4:04 |
| 7. | "The Purge" (instrumental) | Gibson; Westerholt; den Adel | 4:16 |
| 8. | "Don't Pray for Me" (instrumental) | Gibson; Westerholt; den Adel | 3:41 |
| 9. | "Shed My Skin" (instrumental) | Gibson; Westerholt; den Adel | 4:30 |
| 10. | "Unbroken" (instrumental) | Gibson; Westerholt; den Adel | 5:08 |
| 11. | "Entertain You" (instrumental) | Gibson; Westerholt; den Adel | 3:31 |
| Total length: | | | 47:10 |

== Personnel ==
Within Temptation

- Sharon den Adel – vocals
- Mike Coolen – drums
- Stefan Helleblad – guitars
- Ruud Jolie – guitars
- Martijn Spierenburg – keyboards
- Jeroen van Veen – bass
- Robert Westerholt – guitars

Additional personnel

- Christoph Wieczorek – clean vocals (track 9)
- Rudi Schwarzer – harsh vocals (track 9)
- Daniel Gibson – additional vocals (track 11), backing vocals (tracks 2 and 8)
- Zakk Cervini – mixing
- Ted Jensen – mastering
- Anato Finnstark — cover art

== Charts ==
Chart performance for Bleed Out
| Chart (2023) | Peak position |
|---|---|
| Austrian Albums (Ö3 Austria) | 8 |
| Belgian Albums (Ultratop Flanders) | 5 |
| Belgian Albums (Ultratop Wallonia) | 6 |
| Dutch Albums (Album Top 100) | 2 |
| Finnish Albums (Suomen virallinen lista) | 18 |
| French Albums (SNEP) | 43 |
| German Albums (Offizielle Top 100) | 5 |
| Polish Albums (ZPAV) | 44 |
| Scottish Albums (Official Charts) | 16 |
| Spanish Albums (Promusicae) | 67 |
| Swedish Albums (Sverigetopplistan) | 52 |
| Swiss Albums (Schweizer Hitparade) | 4 |
| UK Albums (Official Charts) | 69 |
| UK Album Downloads (Official Charts) | 8 |
| UK Independent Albums (Official Charts) | 8 |
| UK Progressive Albums (Official Charts) | 3 |
| UK Rock & Metal Albums (Official Charts) | 3 |

== Release history ==
Release history and formats for Bleed Out
| Region | Date | Format | Label | Ref. |
|---|---|---|---|---|
| Various | 20 October 2023 | Digital download; streaming | Force Music Recordings | |
| Various | 20 October 2023 | Vinyl | Music on Vinyl | |
