= Dave Grunewald =

German metal vocalist (born 1986)

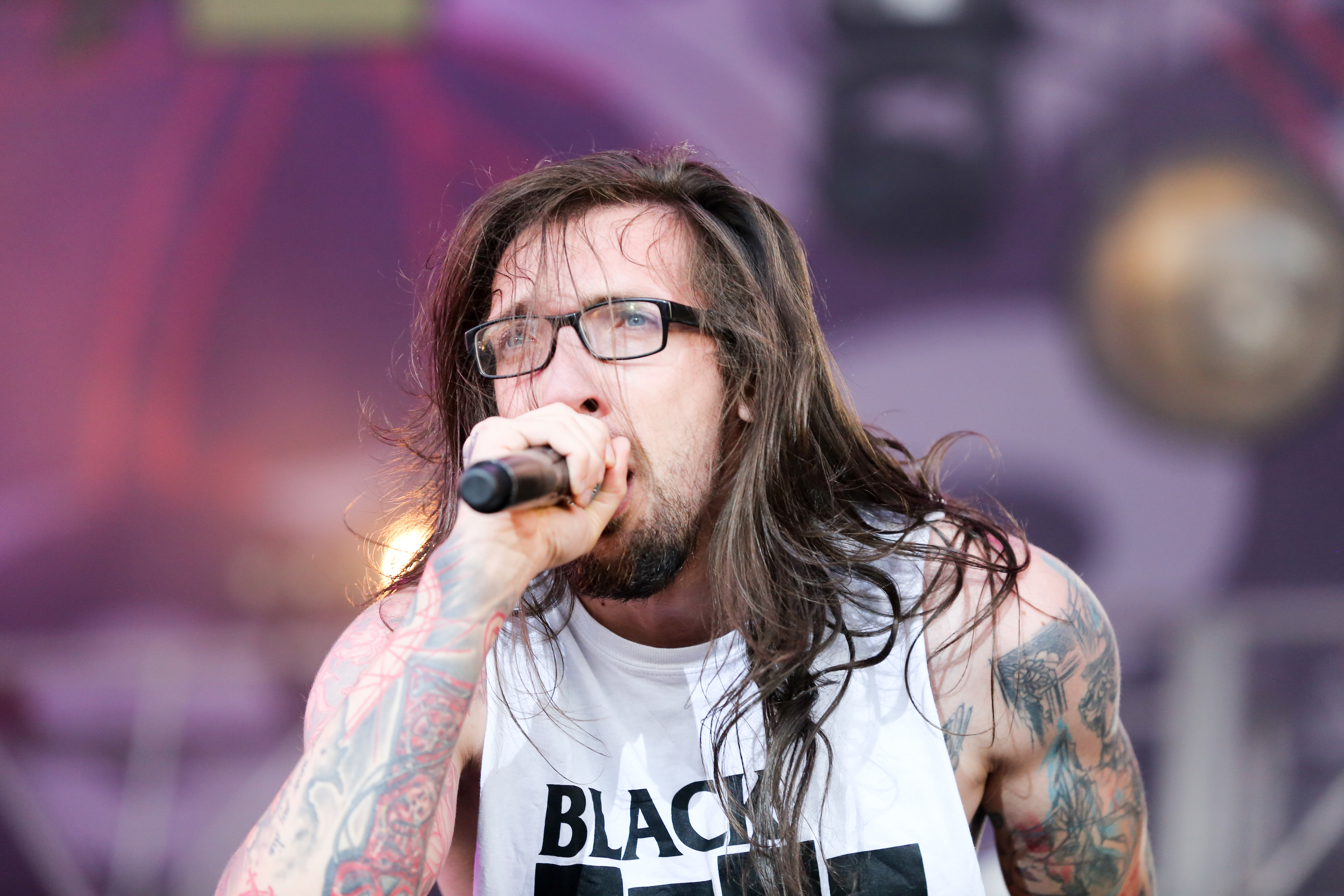
- Grunewald with Annisokay in 2017

Background information
- Born: October 9, 1986 (age 40); Merseburg, Saxony-Anhalt, Germany
- Genres: Metalcore; post-hardcore
- Occupations: Singer; Songwriter; Podcaster
- Instrument: Vocals

Dave Grunewald (born 9 October 1986) is a German metalcore musician, television personality, and influencer. He became known through his participation in the Sat.1 show All Together Now and through his work as an influencer on Instagram. Between 2011 and 2019, he was the unclean vocalist for the metalcore band Annisokay and currently makes music under his pseudonym xHIGHTOWERx.

== Biography ==
Grunewald was born in Merseburg, Saxony-Anhalt. He started his career in 2006 with the metalcore band Nesaia based out of Naumburg. In 2008, he double-tracked with the metalcore band Abort the Legends who were based out of Leipzig. In 2011, he switched to the metalcore band Annisokay who were based out of Halle, with whom he released four studio albums and one EP. In addition to tours through Europe, the US, Japan, and Russia, Grunewald played with this band at many well-known festivals such as With Full Force, Summer Breeze, Deichbrand, Rockharz Open Air, and the Polish Woodstock. During this time, he toured with many well-known bands, including Blessthefall, Silverstein, Electric Callboy, Falling in Reverse, Palisades, Emil Bulls, and Callejon.

At the end of 2019, Grunewald parted ways with Annisokay to pursue his solo career. Since 2019, he has been a solo artist under the name xHIGHTOWERx and created his own experimental mix consisting of metal singing and hip hop, along with trap beats. He has released three singles to date: "Outcast", "G.O.A.T", and "Rebirth".

With the band Machete Dance Club, Grunewald performed the joint song "Cheap Motel" in October 2021 at WDR's Rockpalast. In 2022, he was one of 100 judges in the first season of the music show All Together Now on the television channel Sat.1.

Since the beginning of 2022, Grunewald has had a podcast with pro wrestler Axel Tischer called Here We Go, in which stories about traveling as an artist were told on a bi-weekly basis. He also composed Tischer's current entry music in collaboration with Max Kusari. Grunewald also worked as a voice actor for the role of "Tomohiro Tsuboi" for the anime Gakuen Basara: Samurai High School in 2018. Grunewald works as an influencer on social media, primarily on Instagram; he is also a professional fitness trainer, personal trainer, and nutritionist. He lives a straight edge lifestyle and lives in Leipzig.

== Discography ==
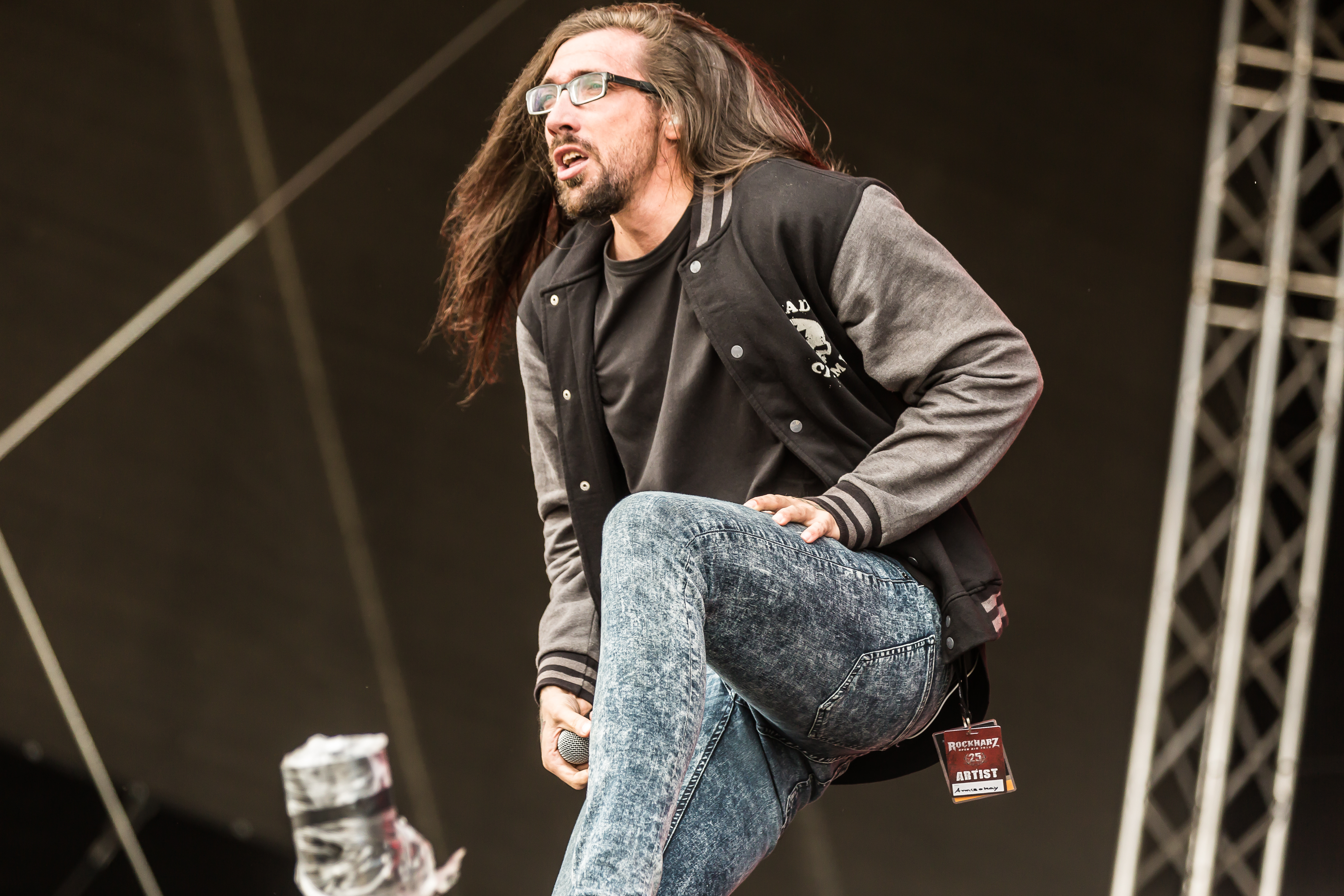
Grunewald with Annisokay at the Rockharz Open Air 2018

=== Albums ===
- The Lucid Dreamer (Annisokay) (2012)
- Enigmatic Smile (Annisokay) (2015)
- Devil May Care (Annisokay) (2016)
- Arms (Annisokay) (2018)

=== EPs ===
- A Celebration of the Dead (Nesaia) (2008)
- 2k8 (Abort the Legends) (2008)
- The End of the Weak (Nesaia) (2010)
- Annie Are You Okay? (Annisokay) (2016)

=== Singles as xHIGHTOWERx ===
- 2021: Outcast
- 2022: G.O.A.T feat. Josiah Williams
- 2022: Rebirth

=== Guest appearances ===
- 2014: tight club Breakdowns at Tiffany`s – Constants (Album)
- 2015: until this moment The Ocean Behind – (Single)
- 2016: wiederstand Unzucht – Neuntöter (Album)
- 2016: snow desert Cold Dismay – The Frost (EP)
- 2017: deep dive Tell You What Now – Failsafe: Entropy (Album)
- 2018: knock ihn aus. Punch Arogunz – Schmerzlos (Album)
- 2019: cheap motel (drella version) Machete Dance Club – Kill the Vibe (Album)
- 2019: jeanny Falco Cover Song Axel One – (Single)
- 2020: votu Mylr – Votu (EP)
- 2021: hoffnung 100 Kilo Herz – (Single)
- 2021: the howling Axel Tischer Theme Max Kusari – (Single)
- 2022: sauer Das Kind – Schatten (Album)
- 2022: FLS Reduction – (Single)
- 2022: manie, manie, manie Abandon the Past – Und Endlich (EP)
