= Alex Yarmak =

Alex Yarmak Олександр Ярмак
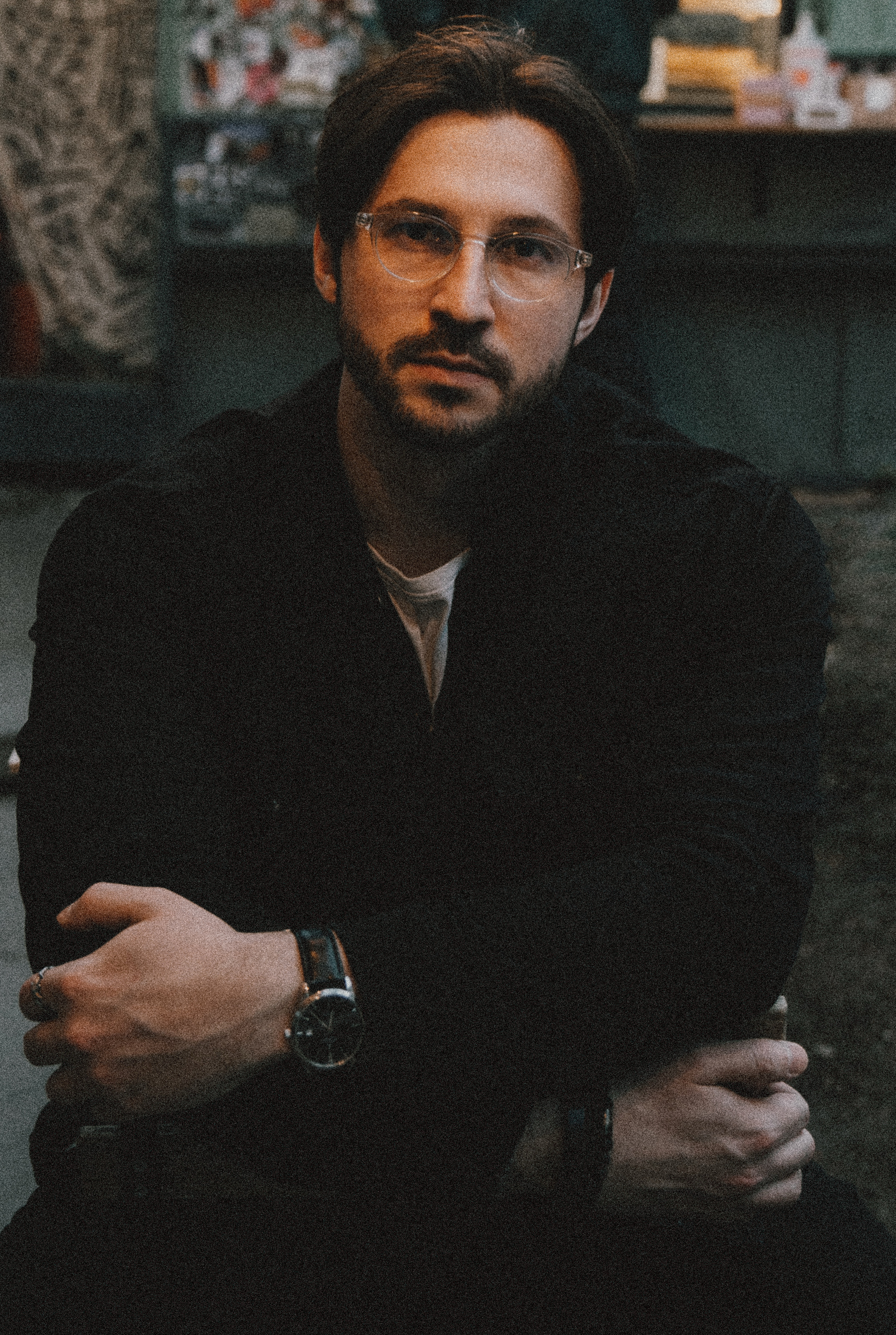
- Alex Yarmak, 2025

Background information
- Born: Oleksandr Yarmak; July 10, 1995 (age 30); Kyiv oblast
- Genres: Rock, metal
- Occupations: music producer. songwriter, musician. vocalist
- Years active: 2021–present
- Website: alexyarmak.com

Alex Yarmak, born Oleksandr Yarmak (Ukrainian: Олександр Ярмак), is a Ukrainian musician, audio engineer, vocalist, and music producer.

Originally from Kyiv Oblast, Yarmak graduated from Taras Shevchenko National University of Kyiv with a degree in banking in 2018. He began his musical career in 2021. At the beginning of 2024, Yarmak started collaborating with the Dutch band Within Temptation. Together, they released a song about the war in Ukraine titled "A Fool's Parade". The band announced that all proceeds from this song would be donated to aid Ukraine during the Russian invasion.

== Career ==
Since 2021, Yarmak has been producing rock music as a solo artist under the pseudonym Alex Yarmak, and has released six albums: Limits, Square Two, Slowdown Sessions, No Pity for the Sinking Ship, Slowdown Sessions II, and ROOTS GROW DEEP. The latter three albums were composed during the full-scale Russian invasion of Ukraine and serve as a reflection on the associated events. Tracks from these albums have been featured on various Spotify editorial playlists, including "All New Metal," "The Core," "New Core," and "Industrial Metal," among others. This exposure has facilitated Yarmak's growth internationally

In Ukraine, he began to gain popularity in 2022 after collaborating with the band Хейтспіч, with whom he released two joint songs, "Stepan Pantera" and "LINA". He also participated as a co-author and producer in the recording of the mini-album Золоті Пісні 2023. In addition to Хейтспіч, Yarmak has worked as a music producer and audio engineer with the Kyiv-based rock band BLIND8, producing songs such as "bulletproof," "on my own," "abandoned," "5AM," and "Overcome The Darkness".

In 2024, Oleksandr joined Within Temptation’s Bleed Out Tour, during which more than €20,000 was raised for the Dronefall project of the Come Back Alive foundation. In 2025, he collaborated with several Ukrainian artists, including co-writing the track Бий with Лея. He also worked with Struktura Shchastia on the track HEADLINE, which was later included on his album Fantastic Red Lines and How to Erase Them.

In his work, he has collaborated with Ukrainian performers and bands. In particular, he was a co-writer of the track Biy together with Leya, and also worked with the band Struktura Shchastia and the singer Leya.

== Discography ==
Albums
Year	Album title	Role
2021	Limits: Date: March 8, 2021	Songwriter, producer, mixing/mastering engineer
2022	SquareTwo: Date: January 27, 2022	Songwriter, producer, mixing/mastering engineer
2022	Slowdown Sessions: Date: March 31, 2022	Songwriter, producer, mixing/mastering engineer
2022	No Pity for the Sinking Ship: Date: August 18, 2022	Songwriter, producer, mixing/mastering engineer
2022	Slowdown Sessions II: Date: November 10, 2023	Songwriter, producer, mixing/mastering engineer
2023	ROOTS GROW DEEP: Date: June 15, 2023	Songwriter, producer, mixing/mastering engineer
2023	Золоті Пісні 2023: Date: August 18, 2023; in cooperation with хейтспіч	Songwriter, producer, mixing/mastering engineer
2025	Fantastic Red Lines and How to Erase Them: Date: September 4, 2025	Songwriter, producer, mixing/mastering engineer

Singles
Title	release date	Comments	Together with
Consequence	April 15, 2021	Remixer	Circle of Dust
5 AM (Remix)	June 30, 2022	Author of the song, music producer	BLIND8, Bejenec
Stepan Pantera	July 14, 2022	Co-writer of the song, music producer	хейтспіч
Overcome the Darkness	September 22, 2022	Guest vocals	BLIND8
bulletproof	April 13, 2023	Music producer	BLIND8
on my own	July 27, 2023	Co-writer	BLIND8, Sable
A Fool's Parade	April 5, 2024	Co-writer of the song, guest vocals	Within Temptation
Бий	June 27, 2025	Co-writer	Leya
