= Intohimo =

Swedish post-hardcore band

- Origin: Jönköping, Sweden
- Genres: Post-hardcore, metalcore
- Years active: 2004–present
- Members: Joakim Bergquist; Albin Blomqvist; Simon Bohm; Jakob Sandgren; Johan Lindblom
- Past members: Love Hempel; Jesper Sandberg; Joakim Möller

Intohimo is a Swedish post-hardcore band, located in Jönköping, Sweden. The band started playing in 2004, and the members were Johan Lindblom, Love Hempel, Joakim Bergquist, Jakob Sandgren and Simon Bohm. Soon, Jesper Sandberg became a part of the crew.

Intohimo is Finnish for passion.

In their first year, Intohimo released two demos: "In the deepest of mind" and "PastPresentAndNeverAgain". In 2006, they won "Best Unsingned Act Award" at the Swedish National Indie Awards 2006. The next step for the band was signing with Pretty Dirty Promotions and releasing their first full-length album, Failures, Failures, Failures & Hope, in 2007. In the summer of 2007, Love Hempel left the band.

The coming year, Intohimo toured in Sweden and Europe. In fall 2008, Intohimo was signed by The Unit Music Company and started working on a new album together with Simon Grenhed of Blindside. In spring 2009, Intohimo pre-released their new album when they were supporting Underoath in Gothenburg. Us; The Hollows reached 15th place on the Swedish billboard chart.

As the year went on, Jesper Sandberg decided to leave the band and was replaced by Albin Blomqvist. With a new guitar player, Intohimo made several shows and appeared on Flevo Festival in the Netherlands. In fall 2009, drummer Simon Bohm also left the band and Joakim Möller became the new drummer.

2010 was a busy year for the unsigned band, and they played at Siesta Festival, Peacedog Festival, Dreamhack and Rock without limits. When the summer ended, Intohimo started working on new material that would sound less mainstream.

In March 2011, Intohimo made their first appearance in America, putting up a showcase at SXSW, Austin, Texas.

In September 2011, Intohimo and Write This Down supported Blindside on their With Shivering Hearts we Wait tour in USA. The three bands appeared in 17 different cities and toured together for a month.

Early in 2012, original member Jakob Sandgren decided to leave the band and was replaced by Christoffer "Poffe" Aronson. In May, Intohimo went on tour along with For the Fallen Dreams and visited Gothenburg, Prague and Wolfsburg among others. In May 2012 the band signed to Snapping Fingers Snapping Necks for the release of the four-track EP Winter Sun (where the sound was more influenced by post rock), and their fourth full-length album Northern Lights that was released October 12, 2012.

The fourth of June 2013, Intohimo announced on their Facebook page that the band was to dissolve, playing one last show at the Frizon-festival in Örebro, Sweden on August 8, 2013. In 2025 the band reunited.

== Discography ==
- 2004 – In the deepest of mind (demo)
- 2005 – PastPresentAndNeverAgain (demo)
- 2007 – Failures, Failures, Failures & Hope (Pretty Dirty Promotions)
- 2009 – Us; The Hollows (The Unit Music Company)
- 2012 – Winter Sun (EP) (Snapping Fingers Snapping Necks)
- 2012 – Northern Lights (Snapping Fingers Snapping Necks)

== Band members ==
- Joakim Bergquist – guitar
- Albin Blomqvist – guitar, backing vocals
- Simon Bohm – drums
- Jakob Sandgren – bass
- Johan Lindblom – lead vocals

== Former band members ==
- Love Hempel – co-lead vocals (2004–2007)
- Jesper Sandberg – guitar (2004–2009)
- Joakim Möller – lead vocals (2013), drums (2010–2013)
