= Shed My Skin =

Single from Dutch symphonic metal and rock band Within Temptation

Single by Within Temptation featuring annisokay

from the album Bleed Out
- Released: 25 June 2021
- Genre: Gothic metal; metalcore; post-hardcore; symphonic metal
- Length: 4:30
- Label: Force Music Recordings
- Songwriters: Daniel Gibson; Robert Westerholt; Sharon den Adel
- Producers: Daniel Gibson; Mathijs Tieken; Within Temptation

Within Temptation singles chronology
"The Purge" (2020)	"Shed My Skin" (2021)	"Don't Pray for Me" (2022)

"Shed My Skin" is a song recorded by Dutch symphonic metal band Within Temptation in collaboration with German metalcore band annisokay. It was released as a single worldwide via digital download and streaming on 25 June 2021. The song was produced by their longtime producer Daniel Gibson, with Mathijs Tieken and Within Temptation serving as additional producers.

== Background ==
Lead vocalist Sharon den Adel confirmed on 18 February 2021 that Within Temptation were planning on releasing more standalone singles before the release of an entire album, as they had already done with "Entertain You" and "The Purge" during the COVID-19 pandemic period after they were forced to cancel the scheduled concerts due to safety measures. The third of these singles, "Shed My Skin", was announced on 1 June 2021, scheduled to be released on 15 June and featuring German metalcore band Annisokay as special guests. A music video for the song was also announced for a 8 July release. The music video's release was later postponed to 14 July 2021.

In an interview for German radio station Rock Antenne, den Adel commented that the band decided to invite Annisokay after the song was already completed. According to the singer, the track had a metalcore instrumentation alongside the symphonic elements Within Temptation is known for. As they considered that Annisokay also had the quality of transitiong throughout different metal subgerenes, without losing their metalcore essence, they opted to invite the band to contribute on the song. The lyrics were also complete at the point and, as Annisokay were already satisfied with the song as it was, the song didn't go through major changes. During an interview for Kink FM, she stated that "a duet always brings something extra. When we had finished the song, we approached Annisokay if they wanted to record it together because we really liked it and felt that it would fit". The track features three distinct vocalists, with den Adel providing her vocals as well as Annisokay's Christoph Wieczorek providing male clean vocals and Rudi Schwarzer executing harsh vocals.

Lyrically, the song revolves around the subject of inevitable changes people have to go through in life.

== Track listing ==
Streaming and digital download
No.	Title	Writer(s)	Length
1.	"Shed My Skin" (featuring annisokay)	Daniel Gibson; Robert Westerholt; Sharon den Adel	4:30
2.	"The Purge"	Daniel Gibson; Robert Westerholt; Sharon den Adel	4:16
3.	"Entertain You"	Robert Westerholt; Sharon den Adel	3:31
4.	"Shed My Skin (Instrumental)"		4:30
5.	"The Purge (Instrumental)"		4:21
6.	"Entertain You (Instrumental)"		3:31
Total length:			24:39

== Personnel ==
Within Temptation

- Sharon den Adel – lead vocals
- Ruud Jolie – lead guitar
- Stefan Helleblad – rhythm guitar
- Jeroen van Veen – bass
- Martijn Spierenburg – keyboards
- Mike Coolen – drums

Additional personnel

- Christoph Wieczorek – clean vocals (track 1)
- Rudi Schwarzer – harsh vocals (track 1)
- Daniel Gibson – additional vocals (track 3)
- Ted Jensen – mastering
- Zakk Cervini – mixing

== Release history ==
Region	Date	Format	Label	Ref.
Various	25 June 2021	Digital download; streaming	Force Music Recordings	
