= Don't Pray for Me =

Single from Dutch symphonic metal and rock band Within Temptation

Single by Within Temptation

from the album Bleed Out
- Released: 8 July 2022
- Recorded: 2022
- Genre: Gothic metal
- Length: 3:41
- Label: Force Music Recordings
- Songwriter(s): Daniel Gibson; Robert Westerholt; Sharon den Adel
- Producer(s): Daniel Gibson; Mathijs Tieken; Within Temptation

Within Temptation singles chronology
"Shed My Skin" (2021)	"Don't Pray for Me" (2022)	"Wireless" (2023)

Music video
- "Don't Pray for Me" on YouTube

"Don't Pray for Me" is a song recorded by Dutch symphonic metal band Within Temptation. It was released worldwide as a single on 8 July 2022 via digital download and streaming and as part of an EP containing the previous three independent singles released by the band and their respective instrumental versions. A limited edition on vinyl was also released on 15 July. The song was produced by their long-time producer Daniel Gibson, with Mathijs Tieken and Within Temptation serving as additional producers.

== Background ==
After the band were forced to cancel the scheduled concerts for 2020 due to safety measures that had to be undertaken as a result of the COVID-19 pandemic, they opted to release a series of standalone singles freshly created as a means of staying active and keeping in touch with their fans before the release of an entire album. After the decrease of the pandemic and the relaxation of the safety measures, which allowed live concerts to happen again, the band opted to continue with this form of releasing songs as a way of leading up to their next studio album. The fourth of these singles, "Don't Pray for Me", was announced on 22 June 2022 and released on 8 July. On the following week, a music video for the song was also released. On 15 July, a 7" limited edition gold coloured vinyl was released by the specialized label Music on Vinyl as a result of their partnership with the band for the release of exclusive vinyl editions. At first, lead vocalist Sharon den Adel stated that the upcoming album, scheduled for 2023, would feature the songs released during this period; however, as the writing process for the album progressed, the singer commented that the band decided to pursue another direction which didn't fit those songs anymore.

=== Writing and composition ===
Lyrically, the song addresses the forcing of one's own beliefs onto other people, who might not identify with or relate to them. According to den Adel, it is a song "about coming to terms with the fact that beliefs can be fluid, multiple or frankly: different". The first idea for the concept came up when den Adel was asked by a magazine to write a free essay for International Women's Day. As she started researching on the variation of abortion laws in different countries and noted several religious parties trying to enforce their own views and beliefs upon the law, the singer decided to comment more widely on the imposition of worldviews on people who do not relate to them. In an interview for Dutch radio station NPO Radio 2, den Adel also commented that she took inspiration from several contemporary events happening around the world where people were wanting to dictate how others should act or live, solely based on their own perspectives and with disregard for other peoples lives and freedom. According to the singer, the 2022 Russian invasion of Ukraine and the overturning of previous rulings that secured women the right to safe abortion in the United States of America were events that moved her and had her wondering about having determining moments in life dictated by someone else. When commenting on the song in another interview for Finnish website Chaoszine, den Adel added also being moved by the 2022 Oslo shooting, a mass shooting targeted at the Oslo LGBT pride event which had happened one day prior to Within Temptation's concert at the Norwegian festival Tons of Rock. Due to that, the pride march was cancelled for safety reasons and the security of the festival had to be improved. The lyrics also approach the fight people often have to take in order to be themselves within these imposing scenarios. The singer commented that the darker tone in the atmosphere and in the instrumentals of the song is a reflex of the themes addressed.

== Music video ==
The official music video for the song was released on 13 July 2022. It was directed by Jeb Hardwick. The video follows the band performing the song at the center of a rotating shrine, in the middle of a field surrounded by mountains. The scenes intercalate between daytime, when the shrine is illuminated by sunlight and the video adopts an orange palette, and nighttime, when the shrine is illuminated by moonlight and the video adopts a blue palette. The scenes of the band playing are intertwined with different occultistic and religious imagery, as well as with scenes of lead vocalist Sharon den Adel performing the song alone, but wearing a different headpiece and with ravens flying in the sky behind her.

== Track listing ==
Streaming and digital download
No.	Title	Writer(s)	Length
1.	"Don't Pray for Me"	Daniel Gibson; Robert Westerholt; Sharon den Adel	3:41
2.	"Shed My Skin" (featuring annisokay)	Daniel Gibson; Robert Westerholt; Sharon den Adel	4:30
3.	"The Purge"	Daniel Gibson; Robert Westerholt; Sharon den Adel	4:16
4.	"Entertain You"	Robert Westerholt; Sharon den Adel	3:31
5.	"Don't Pray for Me (Instrumental)"		3:44
6.	"Shed My Skin (Instrumental)"		4:30
7.	"The Purge (Instrumental)"		4:21
8.	"Entertain You (Instrumental)"		3:31
Total length:			32:06

== Personnel ==
Within Temptation

- Sharon den Adel – lead vocals
- Ruud Jolie – lead guitar
- Stefan Helleblad – rhythm guitar
- Jeroen van Veen – bass
- Martijn Spierenburg – keyboards
- Mike Coolen – drums

Additional personnel

- Christoph Wieczorek – clean vocals (track 2)
- Rudi Schwarzer – harsh vocals (track 2)
- Daniel Gibson – additional vocals (track 4)
- Ted Jensen – mastering
- Zakk Cervini – mixing

== Release history ==
Region	Date	Format	Label	Ref.
Various	8 July 2022	Digital download; streaming	Force Music Recordings	
Various	15 July 2022	Vinyl	Music on Vinyl	
