= Worlds Collide (tour) =

2022 concert tour by Evanescence and Within Temptation

- Tour by Evanescence and Within Temptation
- Promotional artwork for the rescheduled dates of the tour.
- Associated album: The Bitter Truth; Resist
- Start date: November 9, 2022
- End date: December 8, 2022
- No. of shows: 19
Evanescence tour chronology
Korn and Evanescence (2022)	Worlds Collide (2022)	Sanctuary Tour (2026)
Within Temptation tour chronology
The Resist Tour (2018–2019)	Worlds Collide (2022)	Bleed Out Tour (2024–2025)

Worlds Collide (also referred to as Worlds Collide Tour) was a concert tour co-headlined by the American rock band Evanescence and the Dutch symphonic metal band Within Temptation. The tour was originally scheduled to begin in spring 2020, however, due to the COVID-19 pandemic and the safety measures that had to be subsequently undertaken, including the restriction of concerts, the tour had to be postponed. The first postponement occurred on March 13, 2020 and, as the pandemic persisted, a second occurred on June 22, 2020, a third on April 13, 2021, and a fourth on February 11, 2022. With the safety measures lifted, the tour was able to start on November 9, 2022, in Munich, and concluded on December 8, 2022, in Berlin.

== Background ==
The first time members of both bands met was at an Evanescence concert in 2018, which led Amy Lee to dig deeper into Within Temptation songs. Following a festival in Switzerland during the summer festival season of 2019 that both Evanescence and Within Temptation co-headlined on the same day, the two bands agreed that planning a tour together would be a great idea. A few weeks later, both bands posted teaser clips on their respective social medias regarding an undisclosed project, creating some buzz for a possible tour or musical collaboration. On September 17, 2019, it was announced that they would embark on a tour together in April 2020, passing through seven countries in Europe. According to both Lee and Sharon den Adel, a collaboration between them was something the public of both bands had been asking for a long time. The two bands developing a good personal relationship was another element that led to the conception of the tour, as Lee pointed that her and Den Adel "instantly connected" the first time they met. Regarding the title of the tour, Lee stated that both bands chose it together. According to the singer, although they live in very distant countries and have some differences in their music, they also share a lot of similarities, so the name reflects well the embracing of both.

== Development ==
=== COVID-19 reschedules ===
Due to the COVID-19 pandemic, both Within Temptation and Evanescence decided to postpone the tour with rescheduled dates to be announced for fall 2020. The tour was then rescheduled to start on September 2, 2020, passing through the same cities. As the pandemic persisted and the occurrence of concerts was still prohibited, the tour was postponed again for September and October 2021, and then for March and April 2022. On the third rescheduling announcement, Evanescence commented on a press release that "we hate to make you wait longer but we are absolutely determined to make this tour we’ve all been looking forward to happening" and asked their fans to "stay safe, stay sane" during the persisting pandemic. Within Temptation also lamented the postponement necessity, but stated that "although we can't make the current situation better than it is, we hope to put a big smile on your faces again soon", also asking the fans to stay safe. Nearly one month before the tour was set to start on the third rescheduled dates, it had to be postponed once more as the pandemic safety measures had been having different lifting degrees on each country, with some of them not allowing the occurrence of crowded events still. The official dates for the tour were rearranged to take place in November and December, 2022.

During the outbreak, members of both bands took part at the Together at Home movement, where artists made online live performances from their houses to encourage people to stay home and prevent more infection cases by respecting social distancing.

=== Production ===
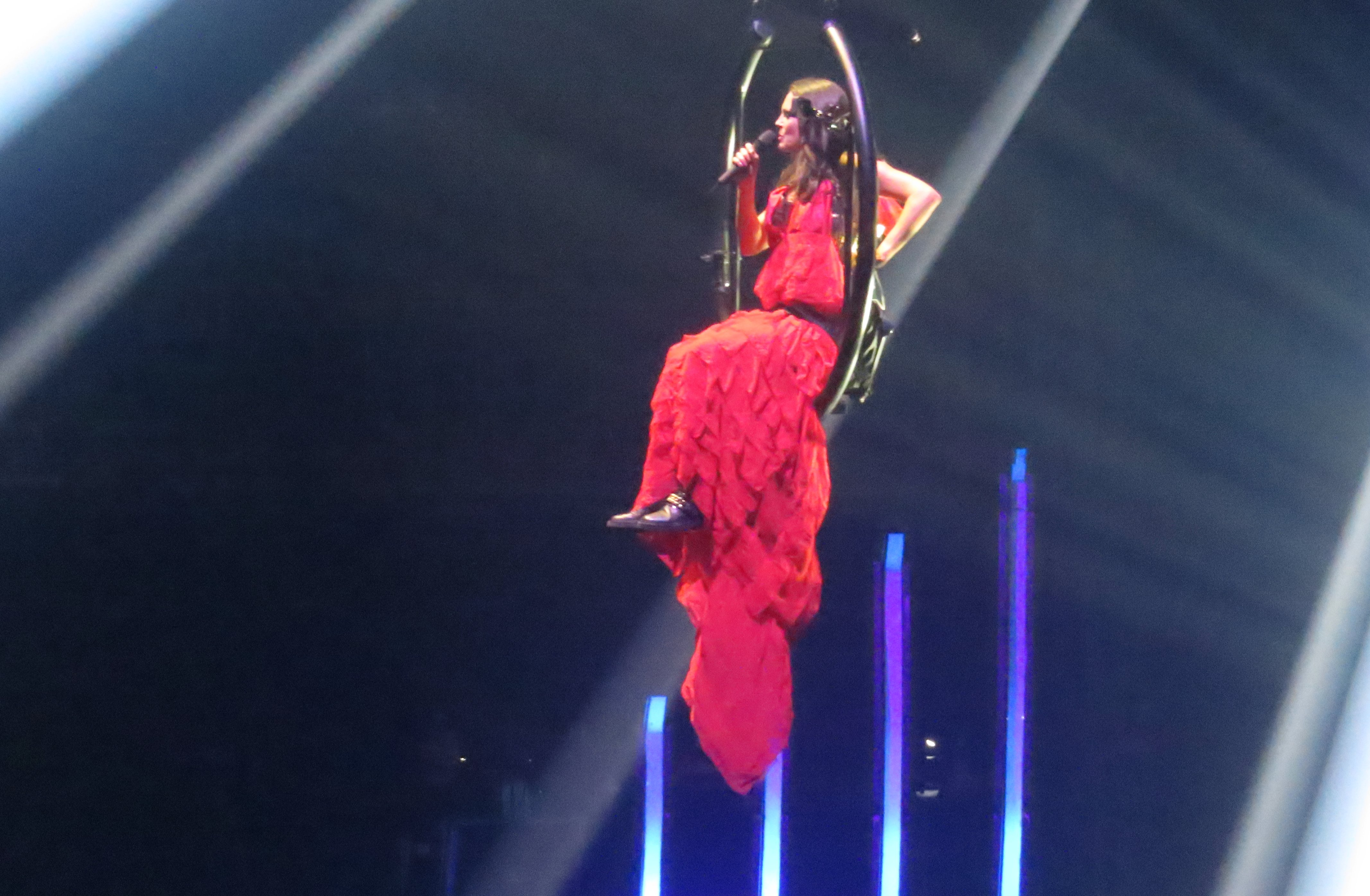
Within Temptation utilized several stage effects. In the picture, Sharon den Adel can be seen performing "All I Need" while being lifted on a swing.

After the successive reschedules due to the pandemic, the tour was allowed to occur on November and December 2022. It was decided that Within Temptation and Evanescence would take turns on which band would play first each night.

The stage setting of both bands were also different. Within Temptation presented a stage with a fantasy and futuristic ambience. It contained a large mechanical sculpture at the center, which depicted the face of a creature. The piece was a central element of the concert, as the sculpture moved and came apart at certain parts of the show. During the song "Angels", lead vocalist Sharon den Adel sang atop of the sculpture, lifted by an elevator, with flaming wings projected behind her. It was the same face which appeared in their music video of "The Purge", but on a bigger scale. For the song "All I Need", den Adel was suspended again, this time performing the song sitting on a swing in the form of a ring and within a circle of lights. The band also made use of screen projections, fog machines and pyrotechnics.

Evanescence presented a different stage lighting set, with a minimal and more concrete stage decoration, which focused on the band members performances. Platforms with stairs were disposed around the stage. At the back, a triangle-shaped screen on a pyramid-like backdrop projected different images and effects for each song. During certain moments of the concert, a grand piano emerged from the floor at the center of the stage, on which Amy Lee sat and played songs such as "Far From Heaven" and "My Immortal".

== Critical reception ==
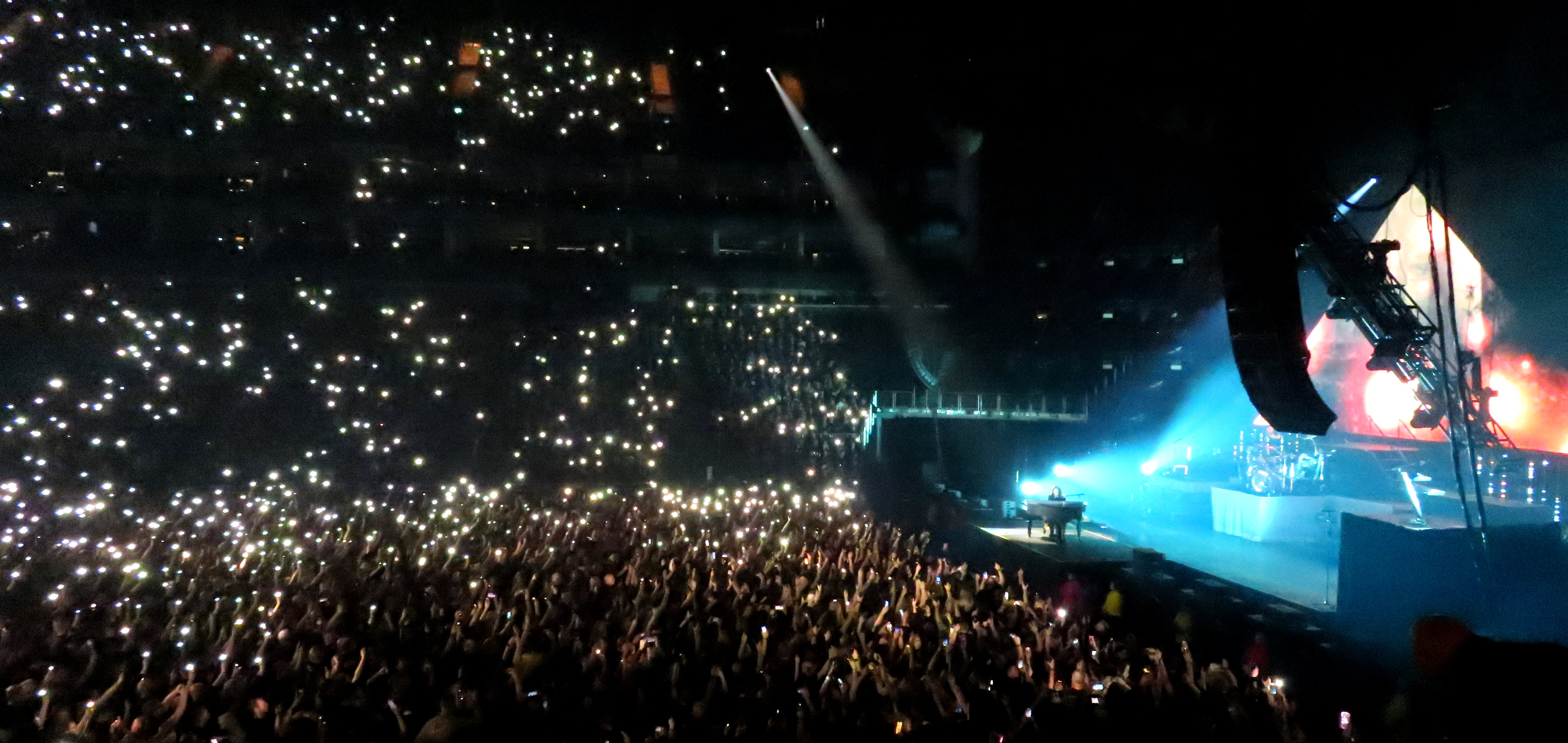
Evanescence performing "My Immortal" at The O2 Arena, in London.

The tour had received mainly positive reviews from critics. Lee and den Adel's vocal abilities, the production value, and the specific characteristics of both bands were among the most praised elements.

Writing for Metal Hammer, Rich Hobson praised the performance of both Evanescence and Within Temptation on their passage through Birmingham, giving the concerts a score of 4.5 stars out of 5. He commented positively on Amy Lee and Sharon den Adel's vocal performances, the song selection for the show, and on both band's vision on how to present their songs live. Also in the United Kingdom, Nick Ruskell from The Daily Telegraph and Callum Crumlish from The Daily Express commented positively on the tour's passage through London as well. The first praised Lee's voice, stage presence, and commented that "Evanescence proved a perfect exercise in classy, majestic heaviness". The second deemed Within Temptation's concert "Earth-shattering entertainment".

Cedric Botzung from Luxembourger newspaper L'essentiel emphasized the setlist of both bands. Commenting on Evanescence, he commended Lee's performance of "My Immortal" and "Far from Heaven" on the piano, as well as stating that the singer "appeared like a metal goddess on "Broken Pieces Shine"". On Within Temptation, Botznug highlighted "Faster" and "Paradise (What About Us?)", calling them "symphonic metal hymns". Robert van Gijssel from Dutch newspaper De Volkskrant was also positive in his review of the first date in Amsterdam. He commented that Within Temptation's concert as a whole was illustrative of why the band have been pioneers in their genre since their beginnings, having transcended the borders of the Netherlands and toured large venues around the world with names such as Evanescence's. He praised den Adel as well, saying that she gives the "bombastic rock that healing power that makes Within Temptation so popular".

== Commercial performance ==
The tour was originally planned to feature 12 concerts, a number which was later increased. A few days after the beginning of the sales an extra concert in Amsterdam was added, as the first one had already sold out. On October 29, 2019, five more dates were announced due to high demand and fast selling tickets. Among those dates, three more concerts in the United Kingdom were scheduled as the London one had sold out, one more in Belgium, and Luxembourg also entered the route. By May 2020, after the first reschedule, a total of 150,000 tickets had already been sold. The concert in Munich was rescheduled to take place at a larger venue for the 2022 dates, also due to high tickets demand. After the start of the tour in November 2022, most shows were sold out or close to selling out.

== Tour dates ==
List of 2022 concerts, showing date, city, country, venue and support act
Date	City	Country	Venue	Support Act
November 9, 2022	Munich	Germany	Olympiahalle	Veridia
November 10, 2022	Milan	Italy	Mediolanum Forum	Veridia
November 12, 2022	Zürich	Switzerland	Hallenstadion	Veridia
November 14, 2022	London	England	The O2 Arena	Veridia
November 15, 2022	Birmingham	England	Utilita Arena Birmingham	Veridia
November 17, 2022	Glasgow	Scotland	OVO Hydro	Veridia
November 19, 2022	Leeds	England	First Direct Arena	Veridia
November 21, 2022	Brussels	Belgium	Palais 12	Veridia
November 22, 2022	Brussels	Belgium	Palais 12	Veridia
November 23, 2022	Frankfurt	Germany	Festhalle Frankfurt	Smash Into Pieces
November 25, 2022	Düsseldorf	Germany	Mitsubishi Electric Halle	Smash Into Pieces
November 27, 2022	Paris	France	AccorHotels Arena	Smash Into Pieces
November 29, 2022	Amsterdam	Netherlands	Ziggo Dome	Smash Into Pieces
November 30, 2022	Amsterdam	Netherlands	Ziggo Dome	Smash Into Pieces
December 1, 2022	Esch-sur-Alzette	Luxembourg	Rockhal	Smash Into Pieces
December 3, 2022	Leipzig	Germany	Quarterback Immobilien Arena	Smash Into Pieces
December 5, 2022^{[A]}	Gliwice	Poland	Gliwice Arena	Smash Into Pieces
December 7, 2022	Hamburg	Germany	Barclaycard Arena	Smash Into Pieces
December 8, 2022	Berlin	Germany	Velodrom	Smash Into Pieces

=== Postponed shows ===
List of postponed concerts, showing date, city, country, venue and reason for postponement
Date	City	Country	Venue	Reason	Ref
Europe – Original dates
April 4, 2020	Brussels	Belgium	Palais 12	COVID-19 pandemic	
April 5, 2020	Paris	France	AccorHotels Arena	COVID-19 pandemic	
April 7, 2020	London	England	The O2 Arena	COVID-19 pandemic	
April 9, 2020	Berlin	Germany	Velodrom	COVID-19 pandemic	
April 11, 2020	Frankfurt	Germany	Festhalle Frankfurt	COVID-19 pandemic	
April 12, 2020	Zürich	Switzerland	Hallenstadion	COVID-19 pandemic	
April 14, 2020	Milan	Italy	Mediolanum Forum	COVID-19 pandemic	
April 15, 2020	Munich	Germany	Kulturhalle Zenith	COVID-19 pandemic	
April 17, 2020	Hamburg	Germany	Alsterdorfer Sporthalle	COVID-19 pandemic	
April 18, 2020	Leipzig	Germany	Arena Leipzig	COVID-19 pandemic	
April 20, 2020	Düsseldorf	Germany	Mitsubishi Electric Halle	COVID-19 pandemic	
April 21, 2020	Amsterdam	Netherlands	Ziggo Dome	COVID-19 pandemic	
April 22, 2020	Amsterdam	Netherlands	Ziggo Dome	COVID-19 pandemic	
April 24, 2020	Brussels	Belgium	Palais 12	COVID-19 pandemic	
April 26, 2020	Esch-sur-Alzette	Luxembourg	Rockhal	COVID-19 pandemic	
April 28, 2020	Glasgow	Scotland	SSE Hydro	COVID-19 pandemic	
April 30, 2020	Leeds	England	First Direct Arena	COVID-19 pandemic	
May 1, 2020	Birmingham	England	Utilita Arena Birmingham	COVID-19 pandemic	
May 3, 2020^{[B]}	Madrid	Spain	Palacio Vistalegre	COVID-19 pandemic	
Europe – First postponed dates
September 2, 2020	Glasgow	Scotland	SSE Hydro	COVID-19 pandemic	
September 3, 2020	Leeds	England	First Direct Arena	COVID-19 pandemic	
September 5, 2020	Birmingham	England	Utilita Arena Birmingham	COVID-19 pandemic	
September 6, 2020	London	England	The O2 Arena	COVID-19 pandemic	
September 8, 2020	Amsterdam	Netherlands	Ziggo Dome	COVID-19 pandemic	
September 9, 2020	Amsterdam	Netherlands	Ziggo Dome	COVID-19 pandemic	
September 11, 2020	Brussels	Belgium	Palais 12	COVID-19 pandemic	
September 12, 2020	Brussels	Belgium	Palais 12	COVID-19 pandemic	
September 14, 2020	Paris	France	AccorHotels Arena	COVID-19 pandemic	
September 17, 2020	Hamburg	Germany	Barclaycard Arena	COVID-19 pandemic	
September 18, 2020	Leipzig	Germany	Quarterback Immobilien Arena	COVID-19 pandemic	
September 20, 2020	Gliwice	Poland	Gliwice Arena	COVID-19 pandemic	
September 21, 2020	Berlin	Germany	Velodrom	COVID-19 pandemic	
September 22, 2020	Munich	Germany	Zenith	COVID-19 pandemic	
September 24, 2020	Düsseldorf	Germany	Mitsubishi Electric Halle	COVID-19 pandemic	
September 25, 2020	Esch-sur-Alzette	Luxembourg	Rockhal	COVID-19 pandemic	
September 27, 2020	Zürich	Switzerland	Hallenstadion	COVID-19 pandemic	
September 29, 2020	Milan	Italy	Mediolanum Forum	COVID-19 pandemic	
October 1, 2020^{[B]}	Madrid	Spain	Palacio Vistalegre	COVID-19 pandemic	
Europe – Second postponed dates
September 8, 2021	Zürich	Switzerland	Hallenstadion	COVID-19 pandemic	
September 9, 2021	Milan	Italy	Mediolanum Forum	COVID-19 pandemic	
September 11, 2021	Berlin	Germany	Velodrom	COVID-19 pandemic	
September 12, 2021	Gliwice	Poland	Gliwice Arena	COVID-19 pandemic	
September 14, 2021	Leipzig	Germany	Quarterback Immobilien Arena	COVID-19 pandemic	
September 15, 2021	Hamburg	Germany	Barclaycard Arena	COVID-19 pandemic	
September 17, 2021	Amsterdam	Netherlands	Ziggo Dome	COVID-19 pandemic	
September 18, 2021	Amsterdam	Netherlands	Ziggo Dome	COVID-19 pandemic	
September 20, 2021	Paris	France	AccorHotels Arena	COVID-19 pandemic	
September 21, 2021	Düsseldorf	Germany	Mitsubishi Electric Halle	COVID-19 pandemic	
September 22, 2021	Munich	Germany	Zenith	COVID-19 pandemic	
September 24, 2021	Esch-sur-Alzette	Luxembourg	Rockhal	COVID-19 pandemic	
September 26, 2021	Frankfurt	Germany	Festhalle Frankfurt	COVID-19 pandemic	
September 27, 2021	Brussels	Belgium	Palais 12	COVID-19 pandemic	
September 28, 2021	Brussels	Belgium	Palais 12	COVID-19 pandemic	
September 30, 2021	Glasgow	Scotland	SSE Hydro	COVID-19 pandemic	
October 1, 2021	Leeds	England	First Direct Arena	COVID-19 pandemic	
October 3, 2021	Birmingham	England	Utilita Arena Birmingham	COVID-19 pandemic	
October 4, 2021	London	England	The O2 Arena	COVID-19 pandemic	
October 9, 2021	Lisbon	Portugal	Altice Arena	COVID-19 pandemic	
Europe – Third postponed dates
March 16, 2022	Leipzig	Germany	Quarterback Immobilien Arena	COVID-19 pandemic	
March 17, 2022	Berlin	Germany	Velodrom	COVID-19 pandemic	
March 18, 2022	Gliwice	Poland	Gliwice Arena	COVID-19 pandemic	
March 20, 2022	Brussels	Belgium	Palais 12	COVID-19 pandemic	
March 21, 2022	Brussels	Belgium	Palais 12	COVID-19 pandemic	
March 23, 2022	Düsseldorf	Germany	Mitsubishi Electric Halle	COVID-19 pandemic	
March 24, 2022	Esch-sur-Alzette	Luxembourg	Rockhal	COVID-19 pandemic	
March 26, 2022	Munich	Germany	Olympiahalle	COVID-19 pandemic	
March 28, 2022	Milan	Italy	Mediolanum Forum	COVID-19 pandemic	
March 30, 2022	Paris	France	AccorHotels Arena	COVID-19 pandemic	
April 1, 2022	Hamburg	Germany	Barclaycard Arena	COVID-19 pandemic	
April 4, 2022	Leeds	England	First Direct Arena	COVID-19 pandemic	
April 5, 2022	London	England	The O2 Arena	COVID-19 pandemic	
April 7, 2022	Glasgow	Scotland	SSE Hydro	COVID-19 pandemic	
April 8, 2022	Birmingham	England	Utilita Arena Birmingham	COVID-19 pandemic	
April 11, 2022	Amsterdam	Netherlands	Ziggo Dome	COVID-19 pandemic	
April 12, 2022	Amsterdam	Netherlands	Ziggo Dome	COVID-19 pandemic	
April 13, 2022	Frankfurt	Germany	Festhalle Frankfurt	COVID-19 pandemic	
April 15, 2022	Zürich	Switzerland	Hallenstadion	COVID-19 pandemic	

- A Due to health issues, Evanescence did not play on that date. Within Temptation and Smash Into Pieces had longer sets.
- B Show would have featured Evanescence only.

== Personnel ==
=== Evanescence ===
- Amy Lee – lead vocals, keyboards, piano
- Troy McLawhorn – lead guitar
- Tim McCord – rhythm guitar
- Will Hunt – drums, percussion
- Emma Anzai – bass, backing vocals

=== Within Temptation ===
- Sharon den Adel – vocals
- Ruud Jolie – lead guitar
- Stefan Helleblad – rhythm guitar, backing vocals
- Martijn Spierenburg – keyboards
- Jeroen van Veen – bass guitar
- Mike Coolen – drums
