= Annisokay =

German post-hardcore band

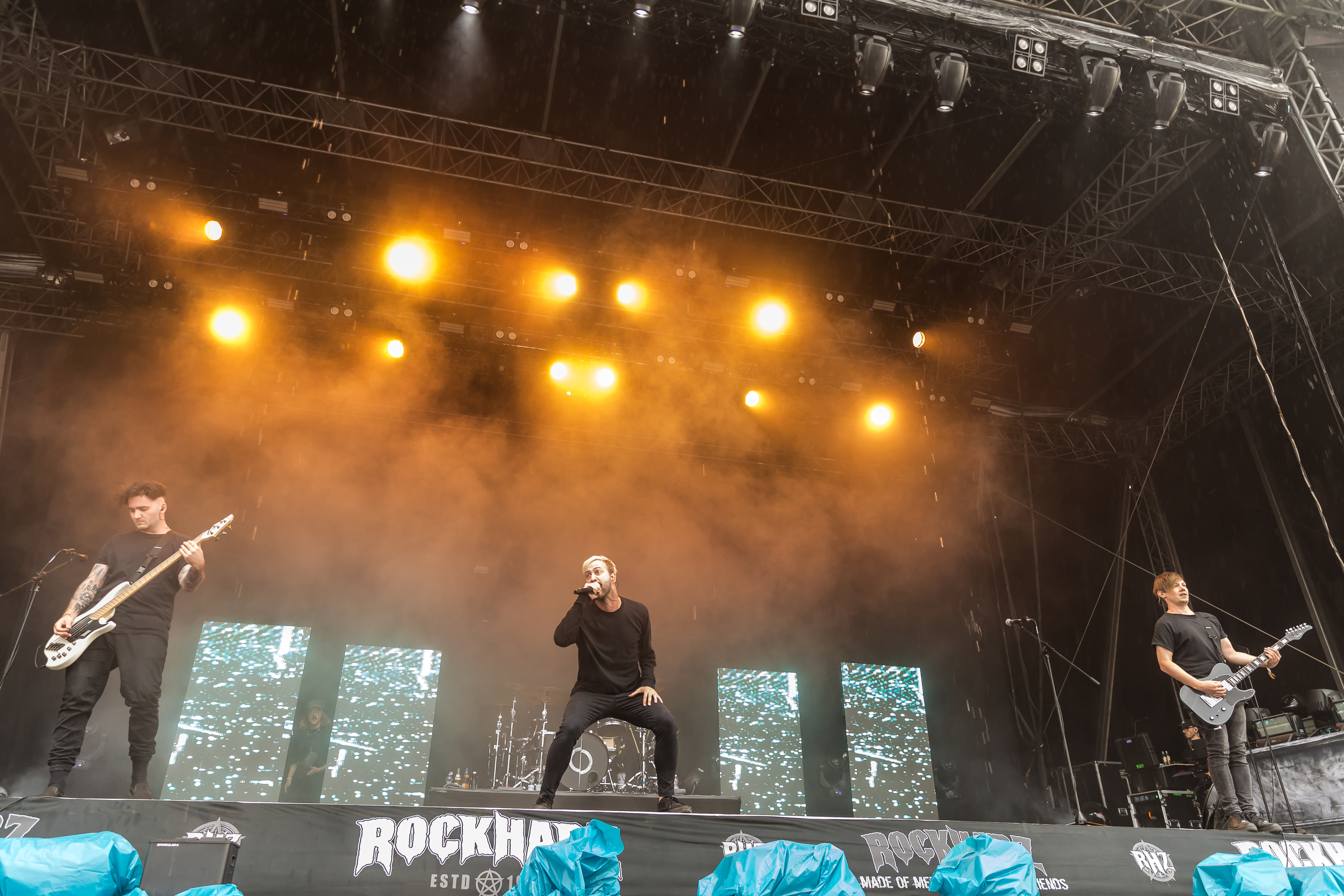
- Annisokay at Rockharz 2026

Background information
- Origin: Halle (Saale), Saxony-Anhalt, Germany
- Genres: Post-hardcore; metalcore; alternative metal; electronicore
- Years active: 2007–present
- Labels: SPV; Radtone; Arising Empire; SharpTone
- Members: Rudi Schwarzer; Christoph Wieczorek; Peter Leukhardt; Silas Fischer
- Past members: Dave Grunewald; Torsten Schwan; Sebastian Lohrisch; Simon Sadewasser; Kay Westphal; Felix Fröhlich; Daniel Herrmann; Philipp Kretzschmar; Norbert Rose; Nico Vaeen
- Website: Annisokay on Facebook

Annisokay (stylized as annisokay, pronounced Ann is okay) is a German post-hardcore band from Halle, Saxony-Anhalt.

Up to date Annisokay released two demo-CDs, two EP and five studio albums: The Lucid Dream[er] was originally self-released in 2012 (2013 via Radtone Records in Japan) and was re-released in 2014 when the band signed a label deal with SPV GmbH. The follow-up record Enigmatic Smile was released in March 2015 and peaked at no. 68 in the German albums charts.

Annisokay toured Germany several times and played alongside acts like Silverstein, Callejon and Electric Callboy. They played at 2014s edition of Summer Breeze Open Air and at Mair1 Festival in Montabaur.

== History ==
=== 2007–2013: Beginnings and The Lucid Dream[er] ===
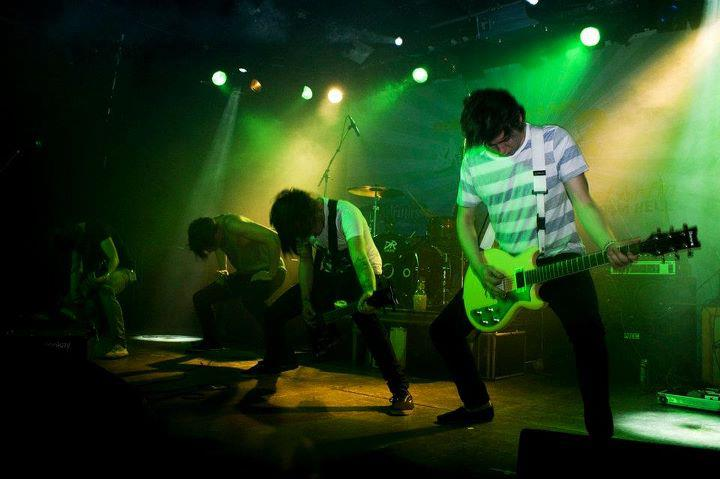
Annisokay during a concert in 2012

The band was founded in 2007 in Halle, Saxony-Anhalt. In 2008 and 2009 the band released two demo CDs with My Ticket to Reno and The Point You Will Still Miss. In 2010 the band produced and released their first official EP called You, Always which was available as CD and Download. The band covered the song "Telephone" originally performed by Lady Gaga which was never released officially.

On 2 September 2012 the band released a music video for a song called "Sky" which was a single for the debut record which was released on 1 October 2012. This album is called The Lucid Dream[er] and was mastered by Joey Sturgis who had worked with acts like We Came as Romans, Emmure and Asking Alexandria in the past. The album was produced by Christoph Wieczorek in his own recording studio Sawdust Recordings and by Aljosha Sieg at Pitchback Studios. Since the band's inception the band toured together with acts like Upon This Dawning, Intohimo, Broadway and His Statue Falls.

In 2013, Annisokay got signed to Radtone Music to release the album in Japan. On 28 June 2013, the band played Mair1 Festival in Montabaur and played together with acts like Boysetsfire, Deez Nuts, Silent Screams and Bury Your Dead. In the end of July the band toured Germany for the first time as headline act. The tour started in Venray, Netherlands which was their first international gig.

=== 2014–2015: Enigmatic Smile ===
In January 2014, the band was part of the We Are the Mess Tour headlined by Electric Callboy. The tour went through cities such as Cologne, Berlin, Munich and Hamburg. Just few days before tour started the band announced flying to the USA sometime in 2014 to start working with Joey Sturgis for their second record.

On 20 April 2014, the band got signed to SPV GmbH which re-released the debut record The Lucid Dream[er] in Central Europe and North America with bonus material. In June 2014 the band toured as support act for Silverstein in some cities in Germany. In Summer the band played Summer Breeze Open Air and Vainstream Rockfest for the first time. In February and March 2015, Annisokay and Vitja played in support for Callejon on their Wir sind Angst tour. On 20 March 2015 the band officially released their second studio album called Enigmatic Smile which ranked at no. 68 in the German albums charts.

Between 10 April 2015 and 25 April 2015 the band will tour as support act for Emil Bulls in Germany. In October the band is set to tour a headline tour in Germany, Luxembourg, Austria and Switzerland with support from Fearless Vampire Killers from the UK and Novelists from France. Fearless Vampire Killers announced Annisokay as their support for their UK tour in May 2015 before.

After an own album tour and several festivals the band announced in late 2015 that they played 72 shows in nine different countries making the year 2015 to their biggest year to date. On 2 December 2015, they announced via Facebook to take a break from live shows and touring to hit the studio for a third album and so-called "secret things". One month later Annisokay made public, that they had break-up with their drummer Daniel Herrmann before starting the work for their upcoming album.

=== 2016–2017: Annie Are You Okay? and Devil May Care ===
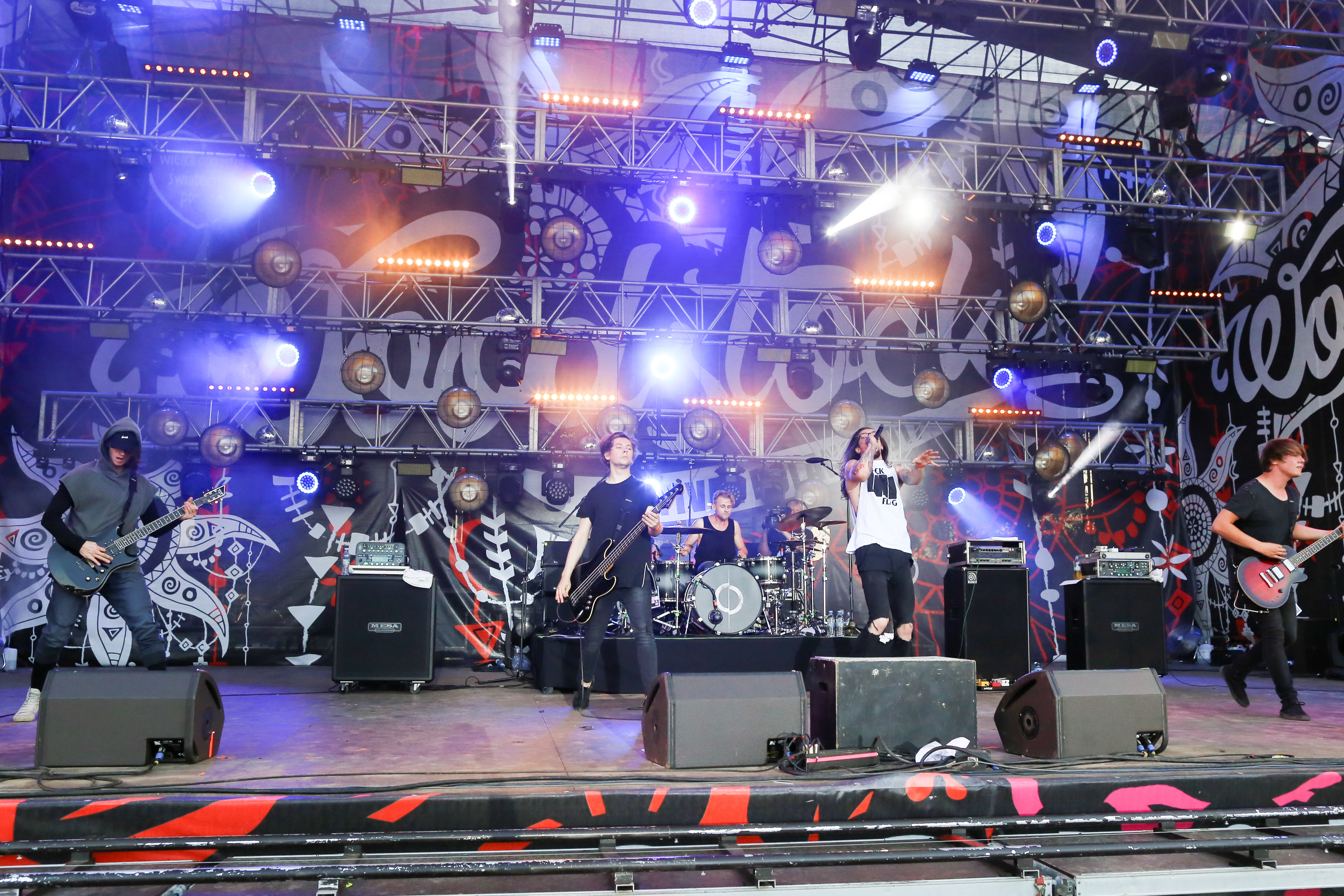
Annisokay at Woodstock Festival Poland, 2017

Despite their message to not play live shows for a while Annisokay returned in February to support Parkway Drive for two shows in Russia. Also February 2016 it was announced that Annisokay are set to support The Word Alive on their "The Dark Matter EU/UK Tour" in May 2016 including shows in the UK, France, Italy, Belgium and more.

On 28 April, annisokay released the music video of the song "What's Wrong" and announced the new album to be released on 11 November 2016. Six month after parting ways with their drummer the band introduced Nico Vaeen as new member in June 2016. A few weeks later they also revealed the "secret thing" – hinted in December 2015 – to be an EP called "Annie Are You Okay?" as tribute to their bandname giver Michael Jackson.

The EP was released only digital at 19 June 2016 and includes hardcore covers of the songs "Beat It", "Thriller", "Scream" and "They Don't Care About Us".

On 7 September, they officially revealed cover and name of the new album, Devil May Care, and released the music videos "Loud" (October 2016) and "Blind Lane" (November 2016) before the album was hitting the market. At the end of 2016 annisokay were special guest at Electric Callboy "Fandigo Tour" and announced their own headliner "Devil May Care Tour" for 2017. This tour contained shows in the UK, Czech Republic, Russia, Belarus, Ukraine as well as 14 shows in Germany. Notwithstanding the above, they played at national and international festivals for example Woodstock (Poland), Rhein Rock Open, Faine Misto Festival (Ukraine).

On 16 November 2017, the band announced they signed with the German record label Arising Empire. Later in 2017, they expand their Devil May Care Tour for three shows and confirmed different festival gigs 2018 including Reload Festival, Rhein Riot and Summer Breeze.

=== 2018–2019: Arms ===
On 18 January 2018, Annisokay hinted via social media they have started work on their fourth studio album. Two month later they announced to support I Set My Friends On Fire on their "10 Years Of Slaughter Tour" which contains 34 shows from 13 July till 19 August. With this Annisokay set the record for the longest United States tour ever by a German band. The band documented their days in the USA with a ten episodes long band diary released via YouTube and also documented their later tours through Japan, Russia and festivals.

In return of the USA tour it was revealed that I Set My Friends On Fire will support Annisokay on their headliner "Fully Automatic Tour" for two shows in UK and 16 shows in Germany till November 2018.

On 12 June, Annisokay made public that the album will be released on 17 August 2018 and is named Arms. A few weeks later they released the songs "Unaware" plus "Coma Blue" and also announced they will play four shows in Japan for the first time while being supported by German band Walking Dead on Broadway.

After the release of Arms the album reached #26 of the official German album charts which made it the most successful Annisokay album in their band history. Till then the band played a Russia tour in March 2019 and appeared on some German festivals including With Full Force and Deichbrand. Later in the year they announced to support Emil Bulls on their "X-Mas Bash Tour" in November/December 2019.

=== 2019–present: Departure of Dave Grunewald and Aurora ===
On 21 October 2019, the band surprisingly announced via Facebook that they have immediately parted ways with unclean vocalist Dave Grunewald. Even though Grunewald was not an active band member any more, Annisokay promised to play every announced show as planned. At the same time the band revealed a fifth studio album to be released in 2020. Only moments after the band's message Dave Grunewald confirmed the break-up and assured that Annisokay and himself have been parting ways on amicable terms, without disputes and no one made this decision recklessly. On demand of morecore.de, a german online music magazine, band leader and clean vocalist Christoph Wieczorek said that shouts and screams will still be a part of the band's music in future. On 26 October, annisokay played their first live show without Grunewald in Schüttorf, Germany and presented Rudi Schwarzer – a member of German hardcore band Wither as well as former member of LEAVE. and Arctic Island – as their new Shouter.

While supporting Emil Bulls on their yearly X-mas Bash tour Annisokay presented the first brand new song with their new shouter Rudi. However they did not reveal the title so it is not known what the name is, or if the song is part of the upcoming album. On 17 April 2020, the band released a new song called "STFU" which is the first song to feature new unclean vocalist Rudi Schwarzer. On 28 September 2020, the band released another song called "Bonfire of the Millennials" which also appeared on their album "Aurora", which was released on 29 January 2021.

On 1 June 2021, Dutch symphonic metal band Within Temptation announced that they have collaborated with Annisokay and recorded the single "Shed My Skin", which was released on 25 June 2021. The music video itself premiered on 8 and 9 July 2021 during Within Temptation's virtual performances.

On 19 March 2023, in an Instagram post, the band addressed founding member and bassist Norbert Rose's absence from recent live shows and revealed that he would be stepping away from the band due to "personal problems in his family". They also announced that Peter Leukhardt who had been filling in on bass for recent tours had officially joined the band. Additionally, they stated that there will be a place in the band for Norbert if and when he is ready to return.

== Band members ==
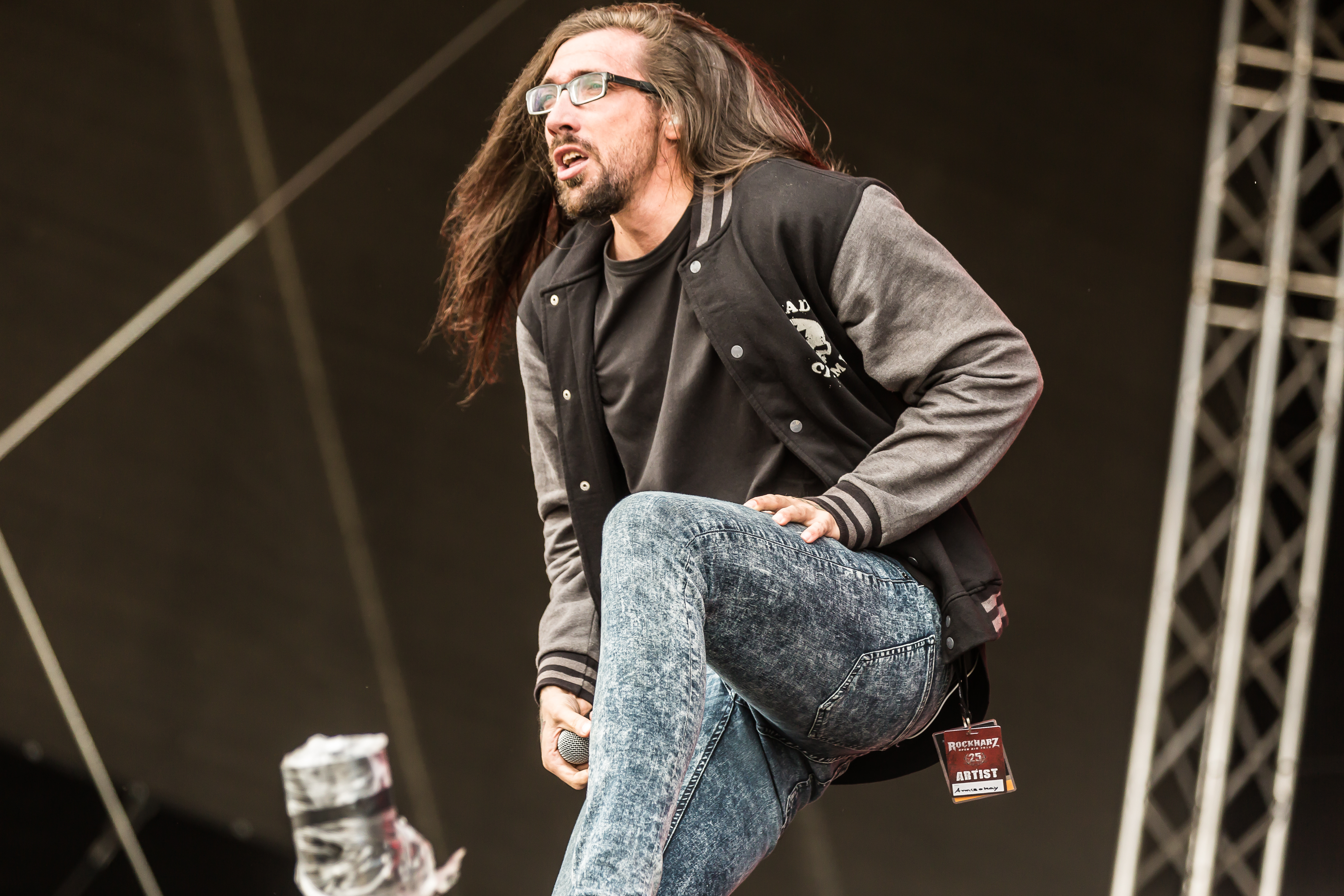
Ex-singer Dave Grunewald in 2018

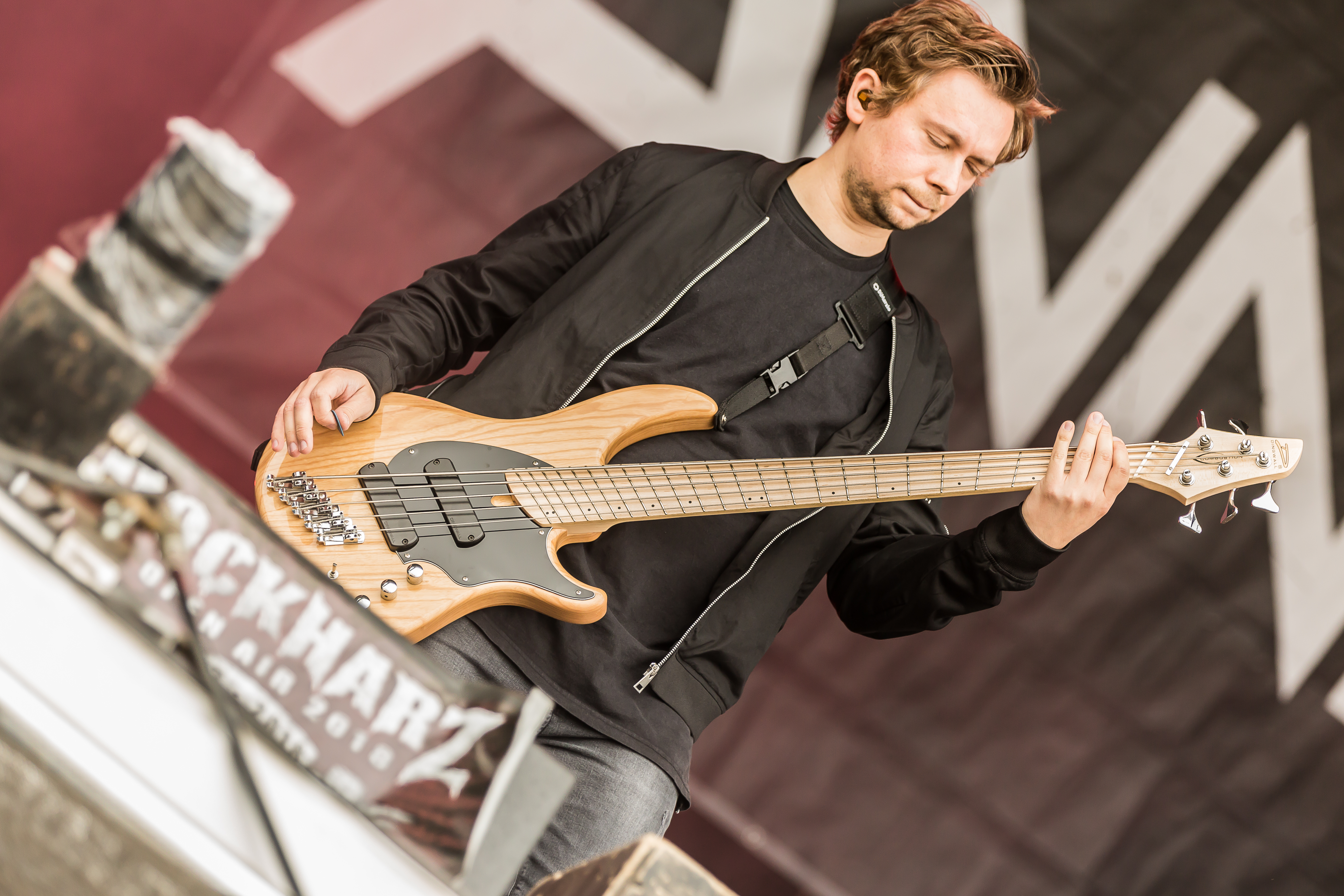
Former bassist Norbert Rose in 2018

Current

- Christoph Wieczorek – clean vocals, guitars, programming (2007–present)
- Rudi Schwarzer – unclean vocals (2019–present)
- Peter Leukhardt – bass (2023–present)
- Silas Fischer – drums (2025–present)

Former

- Kay Westphal – drums (2007)
- Torsten Swan – bass (2007)
- Sebastian Lohrisch – bass (2007–2010)
- Felix Fröhlich – unclean vocals (2007–2011)
- Simon Sadewasser – bass (2011–2013)
- Daniel Herrmann – drums (2009–2015)
- Philipp Kretzschmar – lead guitar (2013–2018)
- Dave Grunewald – unclean vocals (2011–2019)
- Norbert Rose – bass (2013–2023), lead guitar (2007–2013)
- Nico Vaeen – drums (2016–2024)

Timeline

== Discography ==
Albums

| Year | Title | Peak positions | |
| Year | Title | GER | CH |
|---|---|---|---|
| 2012 | The Lucid Dream[er] | — | — |
| 2015 | Enigmatic Smile | 68 | — |
| 2016 | Devil May Care | 74 | — |
| 2018 | Arms | 26 | — |
| 2021 | Aurora | 18 | 49 |
| 2025 | Abyss - The Final Chapter | 26 | — |

EPs

- 2010: You, Always
- 2016: Annie Are You Okay?
- 2023: Abyss Pt I
- 2025: Abyss Pt II

Collaborations

- 2018: Fading Away (VENUES feat. Christoph Wieczorek)
- 2021: Shed My Skin (Within Temptation feat. Annisokay)
- 2022: Dystopia (Caliban feat. Christoph Wieczorek of Annisokay)
- 2022: Empty Promises (Sever feat. Annisokay)
- 2022: It Hurts So Good (League of Distortion feat. Annisokay)
- 2023: H.A.T.E. (Any Given Day feat. Annisokay)
