= Entertain You =

Single from Dutch symphonic metal and rock band Within Temptation

Single by Within Temptation

from the album Bleed Out
- Released: 8 May 2020
- Length: 3:31
- Label: Within Temptation Entertainment BV
- Songwriters: Robert Westerholt; Sharon den Adel; Daniel Gibson
- Producers: Daniel Gibson; Mathijs Tieken; Within Temptation

Within Temptation singles chronology
"Mad World" (2019)	"Entertain You" (2020)	"The Purge" (2020)

Music video
- "Entertain You" on YouTube

"Entertain You" is a song recorded by Dutch symphonic metal band Within Temptation. It was self-released as a single worldwide via digital download and streaming on 8 May 2020, and later added to the tracklist of their eighth studio album, Bleed Out. The song was produced by Within Temptation, their longtime producer Daniel Gibson, who also provided vocals for the song, and Mathijs Tieken.

== Background ==
One year after the release of their latest studio album Resist, the band had already entered the studio again to write and record new songs to be featured in a possible upcoming release. During the preparation period for the Worlds Collide Tour, which was originally scheduled to take off in April 2020, the band opted to finish one of the songs and release it as a single at the time of the tour. However, due to the COVID-19 pandemic, both Within Temptation and their co-headliner Evanescence postponed the tour to September 2020, later postponing it again to fall 2021. After the first tour rescheduling, the band then opted to release "Entertain You" as a stand-alone single during the lockdown period, with more single releases in sight for the following months, as a way of keeping in touch with the audience and deliver new material before an official studio album release. The single was officially announced by the end of April 2020, and subsequently released on 8 May. The song had its live premiere on Dutch television program M on 22 May.

Lyrically, "Entertain You" deals about the way society usually treats people who don't fit its main patterns and uses them for entertainment purposes in a negative and pejorative manner. According to the band in a press release, the song points out the bad habit of self-gratification at the expense of others, and further adds "Offenses, victimization, and exploitation. That happens every day, and is mainly justified in the name of economic necessity, politics, religion, culture, sex, and race". Lead vocalist Sharon den Adel stated that inspiration for the song came from the way certain groups of people often exclude others, mistreating and imposing themselves on the ones they call "different". The singer considers that there is a lack of consideration by these groups for the harm they tend to cause, so self-reflection over these topics is needed. In an interview for Dutch newspaper Het Parool, den Adel added that the song is also about the value of freedom of expression, both in an artistic form and during daily life. During an interview for Brazilian newspaper O Povo, it was also stated that politicians who would not grant equal rights for minority groups were also an issue that was related to the main theme of the song. Regarding the topic, den Adel commented that "a society should be for everyone. I can't stop thinking about how much intolerance is out there".

== Music video ==
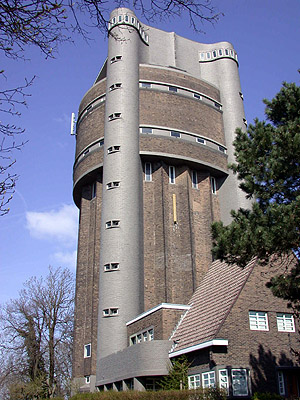
The old water tower of Schimmert served as one of the filming locations for the music video.

The music video follows the same subject of the song and deals with the way that society uses people who don't fit into the main socially acceptable patterns for their own entertainment, and often in a negative way. According to Sharon den Adel, the main idea for the video was a result of her coming across videos going viral of people being harassed as a result of prejudice. It was recorded inside a water tower in the Dutch village of Schimmert and in the G2 Studios. Shootings for the video started on 8 and 9 March 2020 and had to be stopped due to the COVID-19 pandemic, returning on 11 May and following the pandemic safety measures. The video was produced by Welzen Studios and directed by Marten Welzen, who had previously worked with the band. According to Vera Hendriks, producer at the company, the studio provided the visuals and selected the set locations while the band provided the concept and the story. The video was officially released on 28 May 2020.

The video is filmed in a black and white palette, with exception for the colors green and red which are emphasized. The main plot of the video starts with a boy with corpse paint being tossed inside a bunker. As he stands up, he wanders through the place and notices that it is being watched by several cameras. An elevator is lifted down at the corner, and a second boy, this one wearing a mask, is also thrown to the ground of the bunker. As they start staring at each other, a barbed wire club and an axe fall at the center of the place, implying that the boys must fight one another. The masked boy quickly picks the weapons as they keep circling and intimidating the other. When he approaches the corpse painted boy and raises the club, he passes him the weapon instead of hitting, and they start destroying the cameras and thrashing the place together. By the end of the video, both of the boys enter the elevator armed. As they look at each other, the masked boy removes its mask, also revealing a corpse paint make up. The elevator then starts being lifted up. Throughout the video, a group of masked people are shown walking with torches and club-like weapons through desert streets, interchanging with excerpts of metalheads, a young girl wearing horror-inspired clothes, a circus woman, a drag queen, lead vocalist Sharon den Adel wearing a Joker inspired make up and the members of the band performing the song.

== Track listing ==
Streaming and digital download
No.	Title	Writer(s)	Length
1.	"Entertain You"	Robert Westerholt; Sharon den Adel; Daniel Gibson	3:31

== Personnel ==
Within Temptation

- Sharon den Adel – lead vocals
- Ruud Jolie – lead guitar
- Stefan Helleblad – rhythm guitar
- Jeroen van Veen – bass
- Martijn Spierenburg – keyboards
- Mike Coolen – drums

Additional musicians

- Daniel Gibson – male vocals

== Charts ==
Chart (2020–2021)	Peak position
Czech Republic (Modern Rock)	3
Finland Airplay (Radiosoittolista)	61
UK Singles Downloads (OCC)	75

== Release history ==
Region	Date	Format	Label	Ref.
Various	8 May 2020	Digital download; streaming	Within Temptation Entertainment BV	
