= Within Temptation videography =

Within Temptation video discography
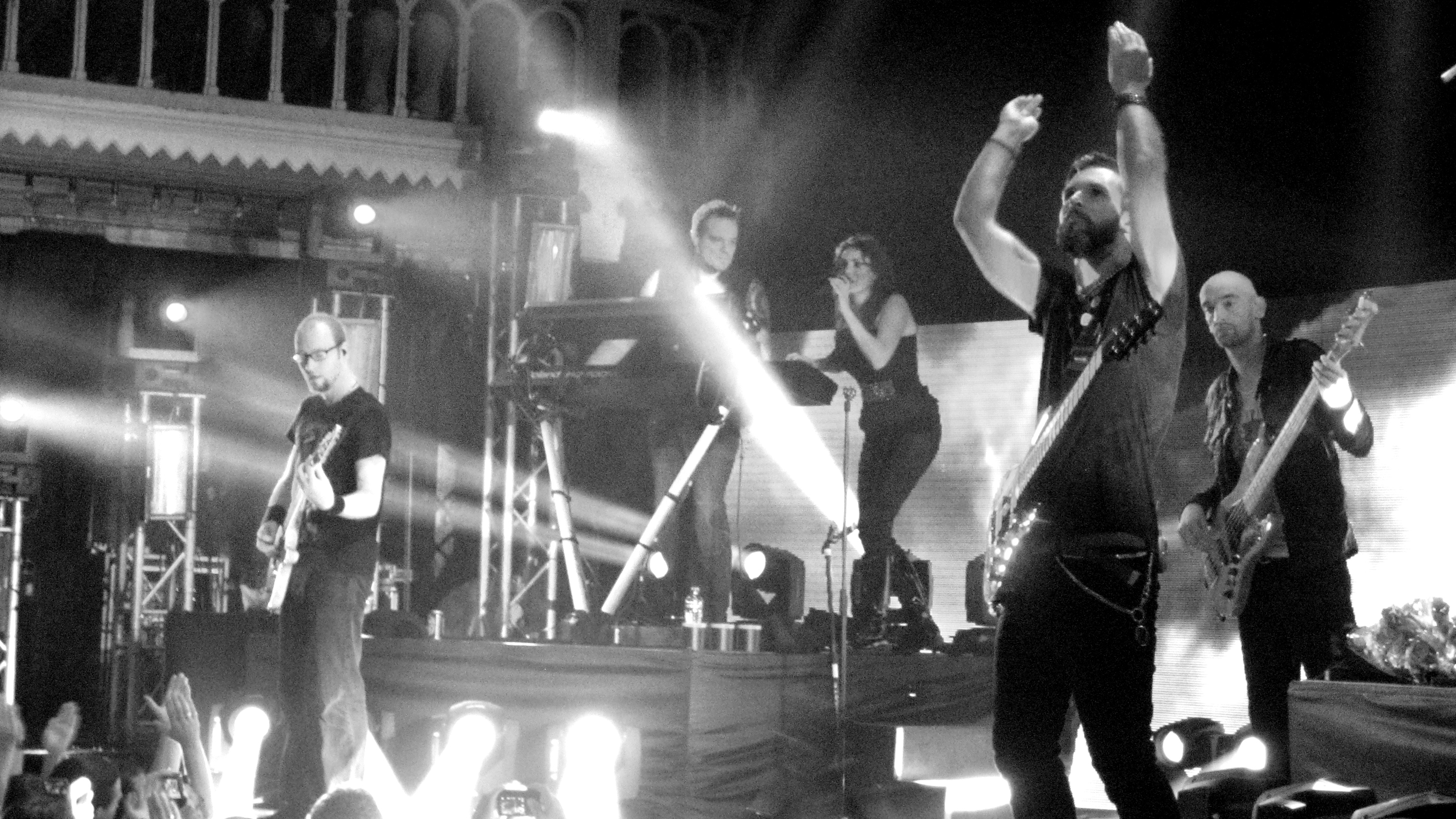
- Within Temptation performing in 2011 at the Paradiso in Amsterdam
- Video albums: 4
- Music videos: 37

The Dutch symphonic metal band Within Temptation has released four video albums and has appeared in twenty-nine music videos and three short films. From their first EP, The Dance (1998), they released an animated music video for the song "The Dance". The first live action video came after the release of their second album, Mother Earth (2000), for their national hit single "Ice Queen" (2001). The single generated two videos, the second one coming only two years later, in order to give the song a better worked music video due to the single newfound international rotation. The second version was directed by frequent heavy metal video director Patric Ullaeus, who had already worked with the band for their "Mother Earth" video.

Besides their music videos, the band has released four video albums and appeared in several television shows, mainly in their home country.

== Music videos ==
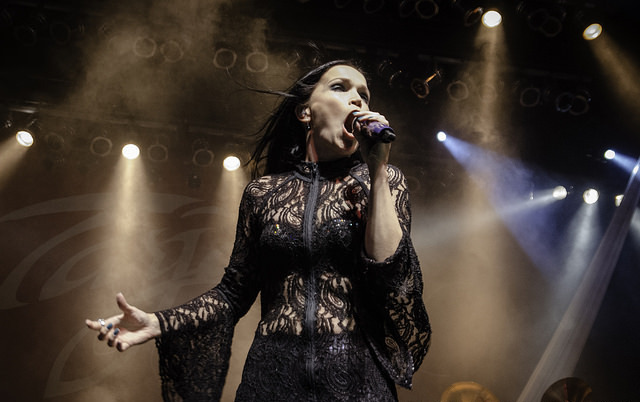
Former Nightwish singer Tarja Turunen appeared on the "Paradise (What About Us?)" song and music video (2013)

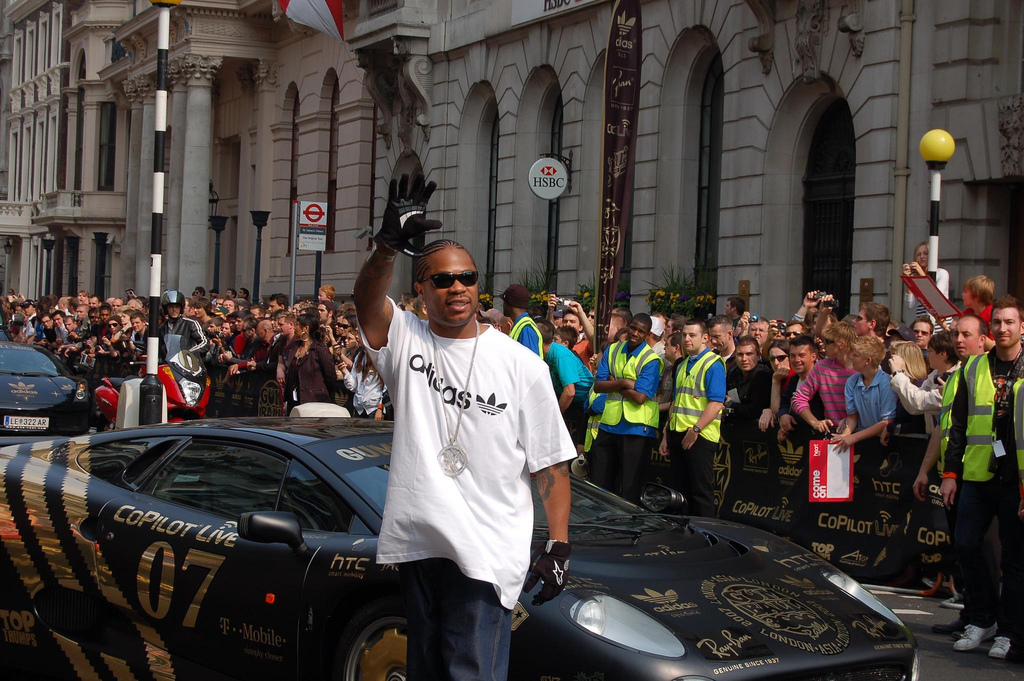
Rapper Xzibit collaborated with the band for the song "And We Run" (2014) and its music video

Title	Year	Other performer(s) credited	Director(s)	Description	Ref.
"The Dance"	1998	None	None		
"Ice Queen" (First version)	2001	None	None	The video features a woman who, while searching for the band on the internet, finds a performance of the band performing the song at the Pinkpop Festival.	
"Mother Earth"	2002	None	Patric Ullaeus	It follows the band playing inside a forest, as lead vocalist Sharon den Adel walks with a dress by the trees, in allusion to the song lyrical themes. An owl is also seen flying through the woods and a river.	
"Never-ending Story"	2002	None	None	It features a video collage of a series of moments from their then-latest tour.	
"Ice Queen" (Second version)	2003	None	Patric Ullaeus	The video features heavy use of CGI.The band members are seen performing alone in various settings, as such as high technology factory, a platform with thunders, the stars and the sun itself. The band altogether, then, plays at the surface of an orange planet.	
"Running Up That Hill"	2003	None	Joern Heitmann	As a couple enters a church, they cansee the band playing at the altar for a crowd. An angel version of den Adel enters the church and possesses the body of band's den Adel, who starts to levitate as the crowd contemplates in awe. The angel then leaves den Adel's body, and the band resumes playing.	
"Stand My Ground"	2004	None	Bernard Wedig	Lead vocalist den Adel enters a room and opens a secret device from which comes an old book. As she reads the book, she learns that a flood is coming from the result of a heavy rain. With the knowledge she earned from it, she manages to find an old ark that can save all band members, and they can be seen sailing through a great ocean at the end of the video. As the history flows during the video, the band is seen playing as a whole on the rooftop of a building while the storm falls and the water floods the world.	
"Memories"	2005	None	Bernard Wedig	As an elderly woman enters an old and abandoned mansion, she turns into her younger self and walks the house while remembering her old love and how the house was before its ruin. She then turns to her old self again and leaves, as the house falls in disrepair. The band can be seen playing with fancy clothes and old instruments in the mansion concert room, and with their typical clothing and modern instruments in other scenes.	
"Angels"	2005	None	Oliver Sommer	It tells the story of a group of vigilante angels who make it their mission to wipe out evil. den Adel is a woman who has been seemingly abandoned on the side of the road in the middle of nowhere. She accepts a lift from a priest, who takes her back to his home. The priest is in fact a demonic serial killer, who adopts different disguises to get to his victims. All of these disguises are seemingly trustworthy people, like a doctor, a police officer, a clown, judge, or a priest. As den Adel stumbles upon a board full of newspaper clippings in the killers home, which are about his previous victims, he seemingly overpowers her with chloroform. He takes her all tied up to the middle of the desert to bury her alive. However, den Adel immediately awakens as the other band members approach as angels, and she is revealed to also be one of them, who was left at the side of the road as bait for the serial killer. The killer, then, is confronted with the spirits of his other victims, who destroy him. The vigilantes then move onto their next target.	
"Jillian (I'd Give My Heart)"	2005	None	None	It features a video collage of a series of moments from their then-latest tour.	
"The Howling" (First Version)	2006	None	None	The video was released as a trailer for The Chronicles of Spellborn massively multiplayer online role-playing game. It presents scenes from the game, as well showing den Adel singing in a game-like room.	
"What Have You Done" (First Version)	2007	Keith Caputo	Jonathan Weyland	Keith Caputo is an FBI agent who has been assigned the task of capturing den Adel, a spy and his former lover. Caputo searches for den Adel, finally locating her singing with the band at a bar in Thailand; however, he is thrown out by the bouncer and is refused re-entry. She makes her way through a jungle in the next scene, with Caputo following her. After reaching a cliff with no escape, den Adel faces Caputo and whispers "I love you." She turns and jumps off the cliff. Although Caputo is under the impression that den Adel did not survive the fall, at the end she is lying on rocks, smiling.	
"What Have You Done" (Second Version)	2007	Keith Caputo	Jonathan Weyland	The video follows a couple having a violent fight. As the couple screams at each other, den Adel leaves and gets a cab, while her partner is left behind thrashing their apartment, smashing mirrors and breaking vases.	
"Frozen"	2007	None	Oliver Sommer	The video portrays an alcoholic man who uses to beat and presumably rape his wife and daughter, and ens up getting killed by a poison slipped into his drink by the first. The wife, as a result, is put in jail and possibly sentenced to death. At the beginning and in the final moments of the video, she is shown writing a letter to her daughter. The video also features the band playing the song in the living room of the family's house, and den Adel picks up and holds the daughter's doll at the end of the video.	
"The Howling" (Second Version)	2007	None	Oliver Sommer	The video follows den Adel as she walks in a beautiful, sunlit field in front of a mansion. As a butterfly lands into her hands, it quickly turns into a dark scorpion and the world surrounding her gets darker, with a lot of wreckage, crows, destroyed houses and burning cars. Den Adel is joined by the other band members in the darker scenes as the video progresses alternating between the two versions of the world.	
"All I Need"	2007	None	Oliver Sommer	Situated mainly in a dream world, the video consists of travel through the mind of den Adel's character, where she follows a mysterious hooded figure. She walks past a moving statue, a horse in a corridor, a sad ballerina, among other surrealistic beings and environments. Her characters is shown to be in a coma at the end of the video, with images from the dream sequence flickering on a screen connected to her mind via wires. The band is shown tied to walls of their cells.	
"Forgiven"	2008	None	Oliver Sommer	A live presentation of the song during their concert at the Ahoy Arena, in Rotterdam. The video is almost entirely in black and white.	
"Utopia"	2009	Chris Jones	Oscar Verpoort	A man walks around a city witnessing various people committing crimes, such as a man stealing a blind woman's wallet and a prostitute being picked up by an older man. He saves a child from almost being hit by a car when his mother wasn't paying attention to what he was doing. As the boy looks back, there is nobody there, suggesting that the man was an angel-like apparition. The band is also seen performing in a run down building.	
"Faster"^{[A]}	2011	None	Joeri Molsheimer	The official video contains scenes from the Mother Maiden short film mixed with scenes of the band performing the song at an old hangar. The version featured after the end of the short film only contains scenes of the band playing at the hangar.	
"Sinéad"^{[A]}	2011	None	Joeri Molsheimer	A woman named Sinéad (introduced at the Sinéad short film) enters a night club hiding two weapons at her back. As she finds her target, she shoots him and causes the attenders to flee. Another target hides from the shots, until she is able to locate and render him. The band is seen playing at the club.	
"Shot in the Dark"^{[A]}	2011	None	Joeri Molsheimer	The video is in black and white and solely features the band playing at the same hangar from the Faster music video.	
"Fire and Ice"	2011	None	None	The music video follows the story of a fallen angel who cuts its wings becomes human due to its weakness on fighting and suffers from it, while intertwining with live footage from the band performing the song at the Lowlands music festival.	
"Titanium"	2013	None	None	It features a video collage of a series of moments from their then-latest tour, as well their performance at the sportpaleis, in Antwerp.	
"Paradise (What About Us?)"	2013	Tarja Turunen	Maarten Welzen; Tim Smit	In a wasteland, two people are seen in heavy protective gear walking through various parts of a ruined civilization, searching for what appears to be parts of a machine. Once the parts are found, they eventually drag the pieces up a sandy slope, where they activate a bigger machine by assembling the smaller parts, sending a big beam of light to the skies causing rain to fall. As the wasteland begins to show some signs of life, the two characters remove their headgear, and are revealed to be two young girls. Some time later, a rich jungle is seen as Tarja and Sharon, implied to be "druids" many many years later, paying homage to the machine and the terraformers who sacrificed to set up the machine and create the world in which they now live. They leave and the red light on the machine goes out, having completed its purpose the machine dies as the world is now self-sustaining..	
"Dangerous"	2013	Howard Jones	Patric Ullaeus	The video focus on the renowned skydiver Jokke Sommer performing gliding through the air and pulling off impressive stunts such as navigating through a narrow gap between two buildings, over Lapa and around Sugarloaf in Rio de Janeiro. The video features Howard Jones singing on the Esplanade Riel, as the band performs in a large room with lights wearing dark clothing.	
"Whole World Is Watching"	2014	Dave Pirner; Piotr Rogucki on polish version^{[B]}	Patric Ullaeus	A drunk man is seen having a motorcycle accident. The video progresses as he struggles to heal himself at a hospital, and lately manages to drop his addiction. Den Adel and Pirner (or Rogucki in the polish version) are seen singing at the rooftop of the hospital.	
"And We Run"	2014	Xzibit	Tim Smit	The video opens with a Nelson Mandela quote that reads: "Let freedom reign. The sun shall never set on so glorious a human achievement". Xzibit is seen bound to a chair with tubes inserted into his skin, inside a dark industrial area, which is filmed in black and white. The band are shown performing somewhere outside in a floating, colorful world that resembles ruins. A hummingbird flies past the band and towards the industrial area where Xzibit is being held. It lands in Xzibit's hand, and he looks at it before one of the tubes attaches to the bird, absorbing its color and killing it. Xzibit breaks out of the chair and leaps out of the building. In between scenes of him escaping and the band playing, he is shown rapping in a black room. He approaches a giant wall and punches his way through it, and as it breaks the sunlight pours through and shines on him, filling the area around him with color. He feels the sunlight, and so does den Adel, and it is implied that they will find each other once Xzibit escapes.	
"Covered by Roses"	2014	None	None	It features a video collage of a series of moments from their then-latest tour.	
"The Reckoning"	2018	Jacoby Shaddix^{[c]}	Noise	The video features the band walking through a desert-like landscape in a dystopian future. The band runs off through a number of machines which aims and fires red laser beams at them during the process. After three members manage to escape the threat, an alien spaceship tries to abduct lead vocalist Sharon den Adel, as two of the remaining members are able to save her by attacking the spaceship with blue streams of energy coming from their white flags, while also defeating the threat.	
"Raise Your Banner"	2018	Anders Friden	Noise		
"Supernova"	2019	None	Set Vexy		
"Mad World"	2019	None	Set Vexy		
"Entertain You"	2020	None	Maarten Welzen		
"The Purge"	2020	None	Maarten Welzen		
"Shed My Skin"	2021	Annisokay	Set Vexy		
"Don't Pray for Me"	2022	None	Jeb Hardwick		
"The Fire Within"	2022	None	Set Vexy		
"Bleed Out"	2023	None	RART Digital		
"Ritual"	2023	None	RART Digital		
"A Fool’s Parade"	2024	Alex Yarmak	Indy Hait		

- A The main music videos are attached to their respective short-films.
- B There are two versions of the video, one featuring Dave Pirner as guest and the other featuring Piotr Rogucki. The storyline, although, is composed by the same scenes.
- C Although Shaddix appears on the song, he is absent from the music video.

== Video albums ==
Title	Video details	Peak chart positions						Certifications
Title	Video details	NLD	FIN	SWE	BEL	SWI	UK	Certifications
Mother Earth Tour	Released: 17 November 2003; Label: Sony Music Entertainment Germany GmbH; Formats: DVD	2	—	—	—	—	—	NVPI: Gold
The Silent Force Tour	Released: 21 November 2005; Label: Roadrunner Records; Formats: DVD	2	—	20	12	—	—	
Black Symphony	Released: 22 September 2008; Label: GUN Records; Formats: DVD, Blu-ray	4	2	1	2	1	—	NVPI: Gold
Let Us Burn – Elements & Hydra Live in Concert	Released: 14 November 2014; Label: Nuclear Blast; Formats: DVD, Blu-ray	—	—	3	—	2	2	
Worlds Collide Tour - Live in Amsterdam	Released: 21 June 2024; Label: Force Music; Formats: DVD, Blu-ray	—	—	—	—	—	—	
"—" denotes a release that did not chart.

== Television ==
Title	Year	Notes
Top of the Pops (NL)	2004	Performer, "Stand My Ground"
Top of the Pops (NL)	2005	Performer, "Angels"
De Wereld Draait Door	2007	Guest; performer, "What Have You Done"
De Wereld Draait Door	2008	Performer, "Forgiven"
Pauw & Witteman	2008	Guest
De Wereld Draait Door	2011	Performer, "Faster"
The Voice of Holland	2011	Guest, performing tips
ZDF Fernsehgarten	2011	Performer, "Sinéad"
De Wereld Draait Door	2012	Guest; performer, "Smells Like Teen Spirit"
Langs de Leeuw	2012	Guest
De Wereld Draait Door	2014	Performer, "Whole World Is Watching"
RTL Late Night	2014	Guest; performer, "Whole World Is Watching"
WBA World: Rostock	2014	Performer, "Whole World Is Watching", feat. Piotr Rogucki
Surprise Surprise	2015	Guest
RTL Late Night	2016	Guest; performer, "Mother Earth"
Van Gils & Guests	2019	Performer, "Supernova", "Firelight"
Margriet Van Der Linden Show	2020	Performer, "Entertain You"
Renze	2022	Guest; Performer, "Never-ending Story"
The Late Show with Nikolaos Tsitiridis	2022	Guest
Humberto	2023	Guest; Performer, "Wireless"
Taratata	2024	Guest; Performer, "Dirty Diana" featuring Ayron Jones

== Filmography ==
Title	Year	Notes
Karo wil goed dood	2023	Dutch documentary
