= Ruud Jolie =

Dutch guitarist (born 1976)

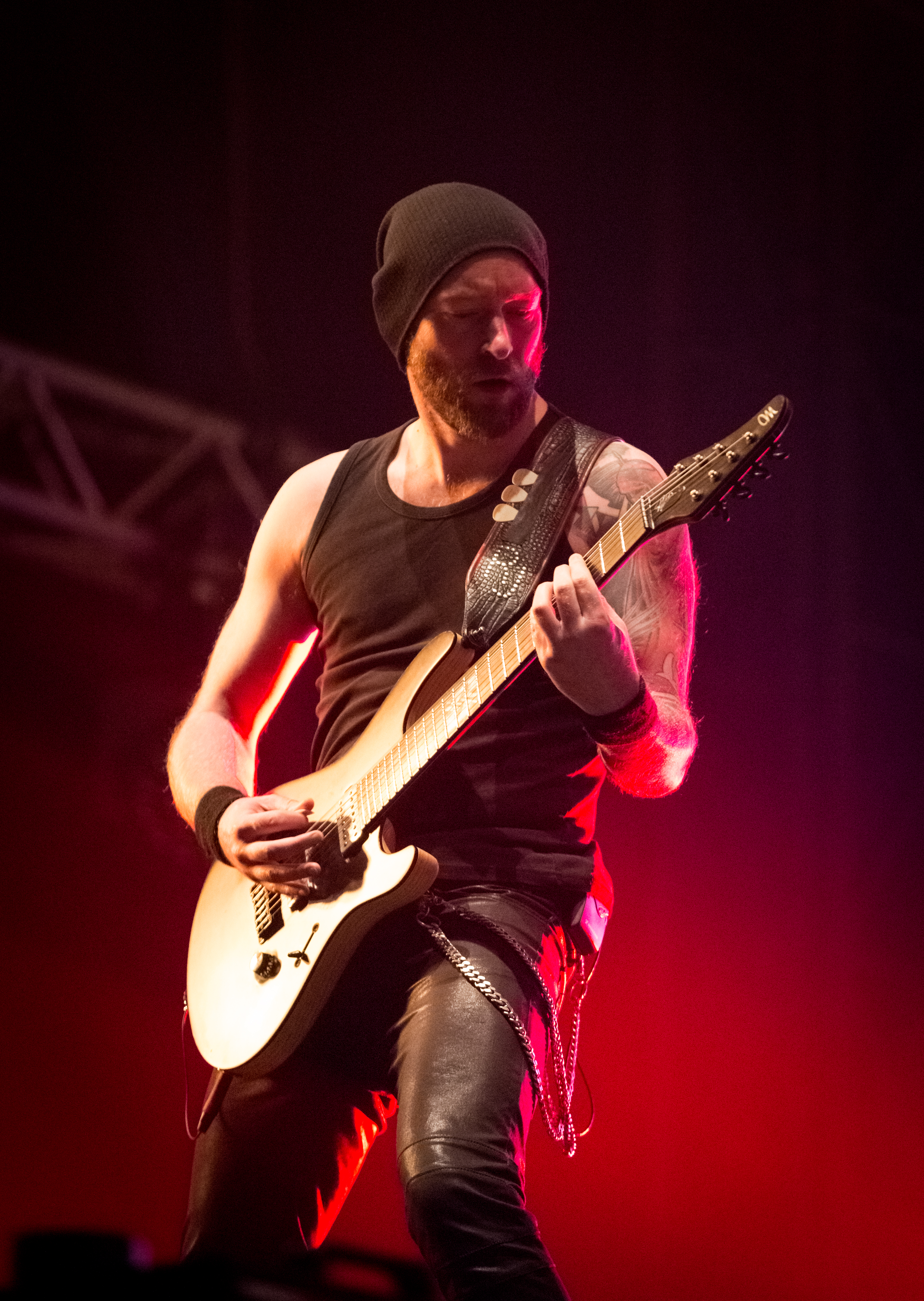
- Jolie on stage (2015)

Background information
- Born: 19 April 1976 (age 49)
- Origin: Tilburg, North Brabant, Netherlands
- Genres: Symphonic metal/metal/rock/jazz
- Occupation: Musician
- Instrument: Guitar
- Years active: 1990–present
- Website: http://www.ruudjolie.com, http://www.forallweknow.net

Ruud Jolie (born Rudolf Adrianus Jolie on 19 April 1976) is the lead guitarist of the symphonic metal band Within Temptation.

== Early life ==
Ruud is an only child. Growing up, he first initiated himself to music by playing the keyboards, but his passion for music developed in favor of the guitar soon after he watched a video of an Iron Maiden concert. Thus, after he was done with high school, Ruud attended the conservatory for his college education majoring in jazz guitar. He graduated in 1999.

== Work prior to Within Temptation ==
Ruud started out by playing with several local bands. He joined Brotherhood Foundation, a nu-metal band whom he stayed with for a period of two years. When Brotherhood Foundation was playing at the 1998 "Dynamo" festival in the Czech Republic, Ruud met Within Temptation who were also playing there. Back then, Michiel Papenhove was still Within Temptation's guitarist, and there were no initial plans for Ruud to join the symphonic metal band yet. In an interview with Starfacts, Ruud stated that his most embarrassing gig experience was when he still had long hair and it was caught in the microphone while headbanging. He thought it was doubly embarrassing because the girl he loved was in front row. They never got together.

After Brotherhood Foundation, Ruud joined an alternative rock band "Vals Licht" (False Light) in 2001. This band was known for its combination of heavy music with Dutch lyrics, something that had never been done before. They released several singles on the Dutch market, of which "Het Licht" reached the top ten charts. A month after joining "Vals Licht", Ruud got a phone call from Within Temptation asking him to join their band seeing as to guitarist Michiel Papenhove was quitting. Ruud turned them down because he had just committed himself to "Vals Licht" and thought it was not proper to "jump from tree to tree" so quickly. A couple of months later, the late drummer of "Vals Licht", Johann De Groot, was diagnosed with lung cancer. In that same week, Robert Westerholt, the founder and guitarist of Within Temptation, unaware of Johann's condition called Ruud again with the same request. Ruud turned down Within Temptation once again due to the uneasy circumstances "Vals Licht" was going through, but in counterpart offered to become Within Temptation's substitute guitarist until they found themselves a permanent member.

== Within Temptation ==
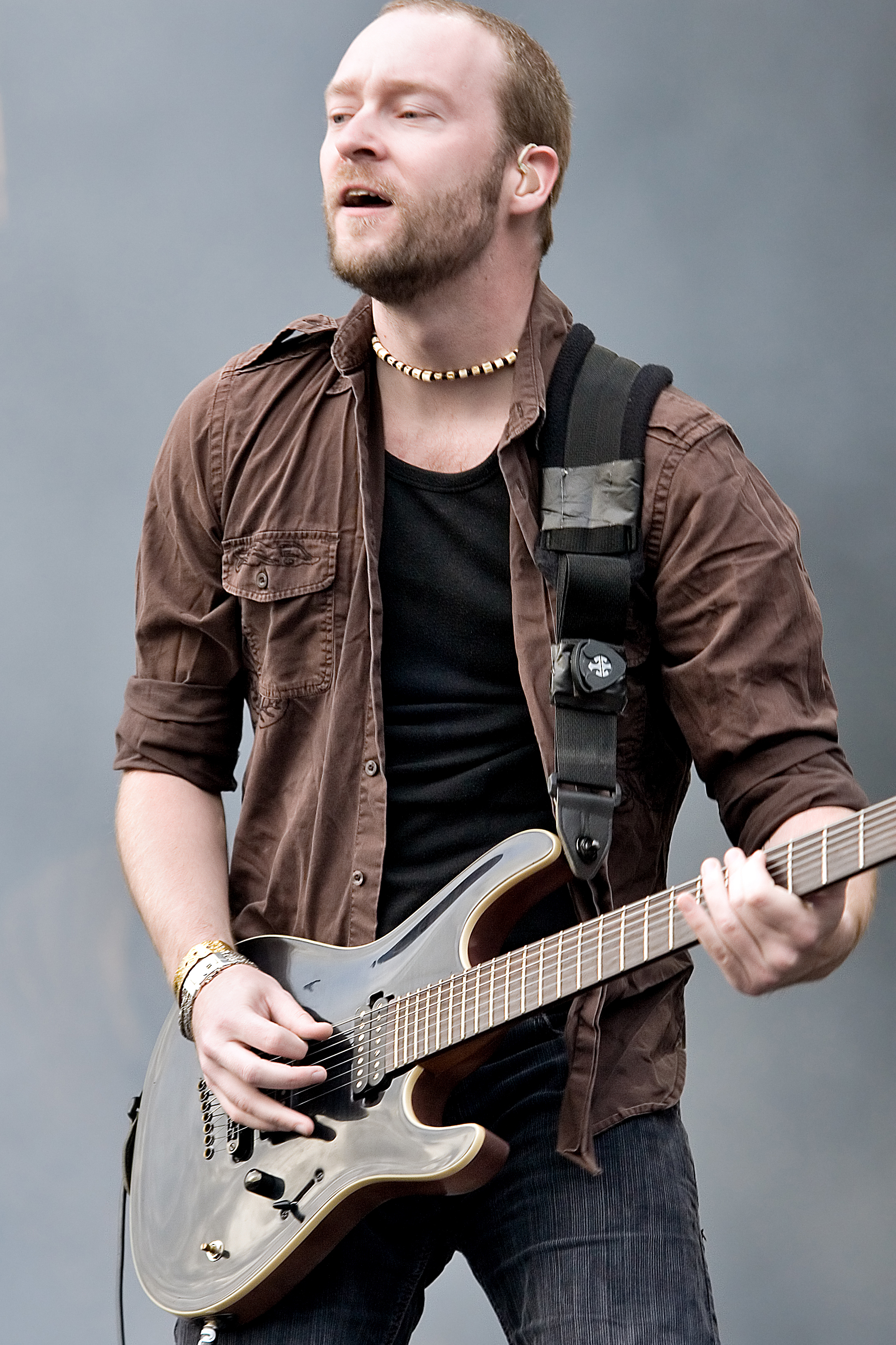
Jolie during a Within Temptation concert in 2008.

In the summer of 2001, Within Temptation had a gig in Mexico City. Ruud, as a substitute, travelled along to perform at the concert. This trip really brought Ruud closer to the members of Within Temptation, and made him realize that he wanted to become a permanent member of the band. Within Temptation had already hired a 'permanent' guitarist. However, when they returned home, luckily for Ruud, that did not work out, and so he received a third and final phone call from Robert asking him to indefinitely join the band, a request to which Ruud finally agreed.

== Solo work ==
In September 2007, Ruud announced his plans for a solo project, entitled "For All We Know". In a post on his Myspace blog, Ruud said "I decided to call it that because I think that name raises all the questions that don't have immediate answers in an instant. And what is more interesting than searching for answers? Everybody is looking for certain answers I guess. Even subconsciously. Therefore it's multi-interpretable. The only questionable thing about the name that might raise some eyebrows instead of questions is when you pronounce the abbreviation of it; FAWK. Ah well, that's just a minor detail... Musically it's going to be heavy in the basics. Very guitar oriented of course. It won't be a shred-fest but guitaristically (if that's even a word) interesting. Some keywords that come to mind right now are; Heavy, Hysterical, Melodic, Atmospherically, Ambient, Groovy, Mellow... Check out my influences in the general info section. Then you see what kind of music I listen to. I guess it's inevitable that some of the 'ingredients' of those bands and artist end up in my own musical stew. And no, it's not going to be something like Within Temptation. What would the use be of doing a side project when it's something like my main band?" The first album was released on 25 April 2011. On the second album there are vocal contributions by Anneke van Giersbergen and Wudstik.

== Maiden uniteD ==
When the Dutch Iron Maiden fan club asked Joey Bruers to do a special show it had to be something other than the regular tribute or cover band. He asked Ruud to join him together with other musicians from several bands to perform a set of rearranged acoustic Maiden songs. The reactions from the crowd were overwhelming. The idea that became a show then became a project. A project to bring all kinds of musicians and fans together to celebrate the music. Maiden uniteD presents classic Iron Maiden songs in a new and exciting light. Acoustic re-arrangements that transform the songs into something that Iron Maiden fans would have never imagined hearing. He's currently recording and producing their third album which should be released in the spring of 2015.

== Equipment ==
Ruud is an official endorser of Mayones guitars. He uses 6 Regius models (6, 7 and 8 string). He also uses a wide range of Paul Reed Smith guitars, Jackson Guitars and Fender guitars. He uses Mesa Boogie rectifier, Diezel VH-4 amplifiers, Fractal Audio Systems Axe-Fx II and Kemper Profiling Amps.

== Discography ==
For All We Know

- For All We Know 2011
- Take Me Home 2017
- By Design Or By Disaster 2024

with Within Temptation

- Mother Earth Tour 2002
- Running Up that Hill (EP) 2003
- "Stand My Ground" (Single) 2004
- The Silent Force 2004
- "Jillian (I'd Give My Heart)" 2005
- The Silent Force Tour 2005
- "Memories" (Single) 2005
- "Angels" (Single) 2005
- "What Have You Done" (Single) 2007
- The Heart of Everything 2007
- "Frozen" (Single) 2007
- The Howling (EP) 2007
- "All I Need" (Single) 2007
- "Forgiven" (Single) 2008
- Black Symphony 2008
- "Utopia" (Single) 2009
- An Acoustic Night at the Theatre 2009
- The Unforgiving 2011
- Paradise (What About Us?) (EP) 2013
- Hydra 2014
- Resist 2019
- Bleed Out 2023

with other bands

- The Outsidaz (2001) The Outsidaz
- Attacks When Provoked (2002) Lieke
- All in Hand (2002) Rosemary's Sons
- Luidkeels (2003) Vals Licht
- Woensdag Soundtrack (2004) Asura Pictures
- The Rebel in You (2006) Yellow Pearl
- Live in Europe (2010) Anneke van Giersbergen & Agua De Annique
- Mind the Acoustic Pieces (2010) Maiden uniteD
- League of Lights (2011) League of Lights
- Weightless Blood (2012) Rani Chatoorgoon
- Across The Seventh Sea (2012) Maiden uniteD
- Samsara (2016) Rani Chatoorgoon

Preceded by Jelle Bakker	Guitarist for Within Temptation since 2001	Incumbent
