= The Silent Force Tour (album) =

2005 live album by Within Temptation

Video by Within Temptation
- Released: 18 November 2005 (Europe); 27 June 2007 (Japan)
- Recorded: 22 July 2005
- Genre: Symphonic metal, gothic metal
- Length: 165 min (DVD 1); 182 min (DVD 2)
- Label: Sony/BMG, GUN

Within Temptation video chronology
Mother Earth Tour (2003)	The Silent Force Tour (2005)	Black Symphony (2008)

The Silent Force Tour

Live album by Within Temptation
- Released: (Europe) 18 November 2005 (Japan) 27 June 2007
- Recorded: 22 July 2005
- Venue: Java-eiland (Amsterdam)
- Genre: Symphonic metal, gothic rock
- Label: GUN

Within Temptation chronology
The Silent Force (2004)	The Silent Force Tour (2005)	The Heart of Everything (2007)

The Silent Force Tour is the second live album by Dutch symphonic metal band Within Temptation, released on November 18, 2005. In addition to the standard double DVD release, the deluxe edition includes a bonus CD. The album was re-released digitally on 14 May 2021, and physically and on vinyl on 23 April 2023.

The main concert features the band playing at the Java-eiland, Amsterdam. Three songs that were performed at the concert were not included on the release, being them "Somewhere", "Enter" and "Running Up that Hill". The song "World of Make Believe" was also scheduled to be played, but keyboardist Martijn Spierenburg felt "unprepared" to play this song live.

The DVD reached the second place on the Dutch DVD charts.

== Content ==
=== Disc 1 ===
Live concert at the Java Island, Amsterdam, live videos from two European summer festivals and the three music videos of off the album The Silent Force.

==== Concert from Java Eiland in Amsterdam ====
No.	Title	Lyrics	Music	Length
1.	"Deceiver of Fools"	Sharon den Adel	Westerholt, Eikens
2.	"Stand My Ground"	den Adel, Westerholt	Daniel Gibson, Han'some
3.	"Jillian (I'd Give My Heart)"	den Adel, Westerholt	Spierenburg
4.	"It's the Fear"	den Adel	Westerholt
5.	"Forsaken"	den Adel, Westerholt	Westerholt, den Adel
6.	"Angels"	den Adel, Wetserholt	Spierenburg, den Adel
7.	"Towards the End"	den Adel, Wetserholt	den Adel, Spierenburg, Westerholt
8.	"Memories"	den Adel, Westerholt	den Adel, Spierenburg
9.	"Pale"	den Adel, Westerholt	Westerholt
10.	"Intro"	instrumental	Spierenburg
11.	"See Who I Am"	den Adel, Westerholt	Spierenburg
12.	"Aquarius"	den Adel, Westerholt	Gibson, Han'some
13.	"Jane Doe"	den Adel	Westerholt
14.	"Caged"	den Adel	Westerholt
15.	"Mother Earth"	den Adel	Westerholt, Eikens
16.	"Candles"	Westerholt, den Adel	Westerholt, den Adel
17.	"The Other Half (Of Me)"	Westerholt, den Adel	Westerholt, den Adel
18.	"Ice Queen"	den Adel	Westerholt

==== Live in 05, Helsinki, Finland, 2005 ====
No.	Title	Lyrics	Music	Length
1.	"Memories"	den Adel, Westerholt	den Adel, Spierenburg
2.	"Angels"	den Adel, Westerholt	Spierenburg, den Adel
3.	"Stand My Ground"	den Adel, Westerholt	Daniel Gibson, Han'some

==== Live at Rock Werchter, Belgium, 2005 ====
No.	Title	Lyrics	Music	Length
1.	"Ice Queen"	den Adel	Westerholt
2.	"See Who I Am"	den Adel, Westerholt	Spierenburg
3.	"Stand My Ground"	den Adel, Westerholt	Daniel Gibson, Han'some

==== Music videos ====
1. "Stand My Ground"
2. "Memories"
3. "Angels"

=== Disc 2 ===
Special features

Backstage footage

- 2003-2005 tours and festivals

The Making of

- The Silent Force album
- The "Stand My Ground", "Memories" and "Angels" music videos

Impressions and Interviews

- 2004: De Boerderij – TMF special (NL)
- 2005: Bettina S (FI): "WT in Dubai" – TMF special
- TMF Awards and MTV Newsflash (NL)
- Live 2005 interview: The Voice (FI) and Kerrang!
- Radio FM (UK)

Extras

- Open Air Forest Theatre "Kersouwe" (NL) 2004
- The Java Island special (NL) 2005
- Photo gallery
- Bloopers

== Live CD ==
Concert from Java Eiland in Amsterdam. The track listing is the same as that of disc 1, but with the tracks "Aquarius" and "Caged" omitted. (These were later included on the "What Have You Done" maxi single).

== Personnel ==
- Sharon den Adel - vocals
- Robert Westerholt - guitars
- Ruud Jolie - guitars
- Martijn Spierenburg - keyboards
- Jeroen van Veen - bass
- Stephen van Haestregt - drums

=== Guests ===
- George Oosthoek - featured vocals on "The Other Half (Of Me)"
- Martijn Westerholt - keyboards on "Candles"
- Ivar de Graaf - drums on "Candles"
- Michiel Papenhove - guitars on "Candles"
