= Black Symphony =

2008 live album by Within Temptation

Video by Within Temptation
- Released: Europe: 22 September 2008; USA: 23 September 2008; Australia: 18 October 2008; Turkey: 22 September 2008; Russia: 3 November 2008; Japan: 24 December 2008
- Recorded: 7 February 2008
- Venue: Rotterdam Ahoy
- Genre: Symphonic metal
- Length: 350 Min
- Labels: Sony/BMG; GUN
- Director: Hans Pannecoucke
- Producers: Matijn Swier, Ralph Broos, Wouter Strobbe

Within Temptation video chronology
The Silent Force Tour (2005)	Black Symphony (2008)	Let Us Burn - Elements & Hydra Live In Concert (2014)

Black Symphony

Live album by Within Temptation & The Metropole Orkest
- Released: Europe: 22 August 2008; USA: 23 September 2008; Australia: 18 October 2008; Turkey: 22 September 2008; Russia: 3 November 2008; Japan: 24 December 2008
- Recorded: 7 February 2008
- Venue: Rotterdam Ahoy
- Genre: Symphonic metal
- Length: 122:59
- Label: GUN

Within Temptation chronology
The Heart of Everything (2007)	Black Symphony (2008)	An Acoustic Night at the Theatre (2009)

Metropole Orkest chronology
Who'll Speak for Love (2007)	Black Symphony (2008)	Ivan Lins & The Metropole Orchestra (2009)

Black Symphony is the third live album by Dutch symphonic metal band Within Temptation. It was released worldwide on 22–24 September 2008 and is available on 2-disc DVD, 2-disc CD, and Blu-ray. Sony Poland announced this item to be released on 3LP. Release was due Friday 28 December 2018.

== Information ==
The release consists of two discs. The first one contains the homonymous special concert that features the band accompanied by The Metropole Orchestra, the Pa'dam Choir, and special guests including George Oosthoek (ex-Orphanage), Anneke van Giersbergen of Agua de Annique and Mina Caputo of Life of Agony. It was filmed by 14 HD cameras on 7 February 2008 in a sold-out concert at the Ahoy Arena in Rotterdam. The album was certified Gold in the Netherlands. Besides the orchestra, choirs and special guests, the concert featured some elaborate extra production apart from the band's common tour performances, such as choreographed circus performances, pyrotechnics, fireworks and special lightning. The album was also one of the pioneers of the blu-ray format release. Music technology magazine Sound on Sound constructed a special article about the making-of process of the DVD, such as the mixing and the editing, and the use of new technology in it.

== Reception ==
Professional ratings
Review scores
Source	Rating
Allmusic	3.5/5 stars
About.com	4/5 stars
Metal Storm	4.5/5 stars
Popmatters	3.5/5 stars
Sputnikmusic	5/5 stars
Ultimate-Guitar	3.5/5 stars

The double release was well received among music critics. Adrien Begrand, from Popmatters, praised the band's current recognition in Europe and considered that the main concert structure and production was a worthy opportunity that only a few successful bands could embrace. Begrand, while praising den Adel's performance overall, considered the excess of ballads on the setlist as a low point. He ended his review stating that the release is "in all, a classy package befitting a very classy band, and a sure-fire fan pleaser."

== Content ==
=== DVD 1 ===
==== Within Temptation & Metropole Orchestra: Black Symphony. ====
Recorded live at The Ahoy, Rotterdam, Netherlands on 7 February 2008.

No.	Title	Writer(s)	Length
1.	"Ouverture"	Jules Buckley	7:43
2.	"Jillian (I'd Give My Heart)"	Sharon den Adel, Robert Westerholt, Martijn Spierenburg	4:39
3.	"The Howling"	den Adel, Westerholt, Daniel Gibson	6:30
4.	"Stand My Ground"	den Adel, Westerholt, Gibson, Han Kooreneef	4:32
5.	"The Cross"	den Adel, Westerholt, Spierenburg	4:58
6.	"What Have You Done"	den Adel, Westerholt, Gibson	5:21
7.	"Hand of Sorrow"	den Adel, Westerholt, Spierenburg	5:40
8.	"The Heart of Everything"	den Adel, Westerholt, Gibson	5:47
9.	"Forgiven"	den Adel, Westerholt, Spierenburg	4:52
10.	"Somewhere"	den Adel, Westerholt	4:24
11.	"The Swan Song"	den Adel, Westerholt, Spierenburg	4:00
12.	"Memories"	den Adel, Westerholt, Spierenburg	4:03
13.	"Our Solemn Hour"	den Adel, Westerholt, Spierenburg	5:22
14.	"The Other Half (Of Me)"	den Adel, Westerholt	5:03
15.	"Frozen"	den Adel, Westerholt, Gibson	4:31
16.	"The Promise"	den Adel, Westerholt	8:14
17.	"Angels"	den Adel, Westerholt, Spierenburg	4:01
18.	"Mother Earth"	den Adel, Westerholt, Guus Eikens	5:59
19.	"The Truth Beneath the Rose"	den Adel, Westerholt, Spierenburg	7:22
20.	"Deceiver of Fools"	den Adel, Westerholt	7:38
21.	"All I Need"	den Adel, Westerholt	4:54
22.	"Ice Queen"	den Adel, Westerholt	7:15

=== Extras ===
==== Backstage Report ====
1. Interviews with the band, conductor Jules Buckley, members of the orchestra, Mina Caputo and various fans outside the Ahoy. Presented by Dennis Weening.

==== Documentary ====
1. 30-minute documentary with exclusive never-seen-before footage. Interviews with band members on the band's history and on Black Symphony. Produced by the NPS, Netherlands.

==== Countdown Black Symphony ====
1. A short overview of all the happenings on the day of the show, from when the production starts in the morning, until showtime in the evening.

=== DVD 2 ===
==== Bonus Concert ====
Recorded live at The Beursgebouw, Eindhoven, Netherlands on 24 November 2007.

No.	Title	Writer(s)	Length
1.	"Intro"	Martijn Spierenburg
2.	"Jillian (I'd Give My Heart)"	Sharon den Adel, Robert Westerholt, Spierenburg
3.	"The Howling"	den Adel, Westerholt, Daniel Gibson
4.	"The Cross"	den Adel, Westerholt, Spierenburg
5.	"Hand of Sorrow"	den Adel, Westerholt, Spierenburg
6.	"The Heart of Everything"	den Adel, Westerholt, Gibson
7.	"Restless"	den Adel, Westerholt, Martijn Westerholt
8.	"Our Solemn Hour"	den Adel, Westerholt, Spierenburg
9.	"Mother Earth"	den Adel, Westerholt, Guus Eikens
10.	"Jane Doe"	den Adel, Westerholt, Eikens
11.	"The Truth Beneath the Rose"	den Adel, Westerholt, Spierenburg
12.	"All I Need"	den Adel, Westerholt

==== Music Videos ====
1. What Have You Done (with Mina Caputo)
2. Frozen
3. The Howling
4. All I Need

==== The Making Of... ====
1. Frozen
2. The Howling
3. All I Need

==== World Tour Impressions ====
1. An hour of exclusive footage recorded on the road by Within Temptation in the US & Canada, Europe, Turkey, Mexico, Colombia, Japan and the UK.

==== Extras ====
1. TMF Awards Benelux (featuring WT's performance of What Have You Done and All I Need at the TMF Awards Belgium)
2. The Dutch Pop Award Show (featuring the male members of WT dressing up in dresses and receiving the Netherlands' most important music award)
3. Photoshoot Erwin Olaf (very exclusive footage of Erwin Olaf working with us on the photos made for The Heart Of Everything)
4. Orchestra Recordings (filmed during the recording of the orchestra parts for The Heart Of Everything)

=== Specs ===
PAL/NTSC format. Contains Dolby Digital 2.0, 5.1 and DTS 96/24 surround sound, filmed in high definition, widescreen. Subtitled in English. Coded region-free, with a total running time of 470 minutes as it also contains both CDs of the Ahoy concert.

== CD track listing ==
=== Europe and Japanese version ===
Disc one
No.	Title	Writer(s)	Length
1.	"Ouverture"	Jules Buckley	7:43
2.	"Jillian (I'd Give My Heart)"	Sharon den Adel, Robert Westerholt, Martijn Spierenburg	4:39
3.	"The Howling"	den Adel, Westerholt, Daniel Gibson	6:30
4.	"Stand My Ground"	den Adel, Westerholt, Gibson, Han Kooreneef	4:32
5.	"The Cross"	den Adel, Westerholt, Spierenburg	4:58
6.	"What Have You Done"	den Adel, Westerholt, Gibson	5:21
7.	"Hand of Sorrow"	den Adel, Westerholt, Spierenburg	5:40
8.	"The Heart of Everything"	den Adel, Westerholt, Gibson	5:47
9.	"Forgiven"	den Adel, Westerholt, Spierenburg	4:52
10.	"Somewhere"	den Adel, Westerholt	4:24
11.	"The Swan Song"	den Adel, Westerholt, Spierenburg	4:00
12.	"Memories"	den Adel, Westerholt, Spierenburg	4:03

Disc two
No.	Title	Writer(s)	Length
1.	"Our Solemn Hour"	den Adel, Westerholt, Spierenburg	5:22
2.	"The Other Half (Of Me)"	den Adel, Westerholt	5:03
3.	"Frozen"	den Adel, Westerholt, Gibson	4:31
4.	"The Promise"	den Adel, Westerholt	8:14
5.	"Angels"	den Adel, Westerholt, Spierenburg	4:01
6.	"Mother Earth"	den Adel, Westerholt, Guus Eikens	5:59
7.	"The Truth Beneath the Rose"	den Adel, Westerholt, Spierenburg	7:22
8.	"Deceiver of Fools"	den Adel, Westerholt	7:38
9.	"All I Need"	den Adel, Westerholt	4:54
10.	"Ice Queen"	den Adel, Westerholt	7:15

US Version
No.	Title	Writer(s)	Length
1.	"Ouverture"	Jules Buckley	7:43
2.	"Jillian (I'd Give My Heart)"	Sharon den Adel, Robert Westerholt, Martijn Spierenburg	4:39
3.	"The Howling"	den Adel, Westerholt, Daniel Gibson	6:30
4.	"Stand My Ground"	den Adel, Westerholt, Gibson, Han Kooreneef	4:32
5.	"The Cross"	den Adel, Westerholt, Spierenburg	4:58
6.	"What Have You Done"	den Adel, Westerholt, Gibson	5:21
7.	"Hand of Sorrow"	den Adel, Westerholt, Spierenburg	5:40
8.	"Forgiven"	den Adel, Westerholt, Spierenburg	4:52
9.	"Somewhere"	den Adel, Westerholt	4:24
10.	"Our Solemn Hour"	den Adel, Westerholt	5:22
11.	"Frozen"	den Adel, Westerholt, Gibson	4:31
12.	"Angels"	den Adel, Westerholt, Spierenburg	4:01
13.	"Mother Earth"	den Adel, Westerholt, Guus Eikens	5:59

- The iTunes, amazon.com (MP3), Rhapsody, and Zune Marketplace versions of Black Symphony include all 22 songs.

== Editions ==
- Europe: 2-CD Digipack/ 2-DVD Digipack/ 2-Disc Blu-ray
- Europe, UK, Australia: 4-Disc Special Edition Digipack
- USA, Canada: 1-CD+1-DVD Jewelcase
- Japan: 2-CD+1-DVD Digipack
- Argentina: 1-DVD

== Personnel ==
=== The Band ===
- Sharon den Adel – vocals
- Robert Westerholt – rhythm guitar, growls
- Ruud Jolie – lead guitar
- Martijn Spierenburg – keyboards
- Jeroen van Veen – bass guitar
- Stephen van Haestregt – drums

=== Special Guests ===
- Mina Caputo – featured vocals on "What Have You Done"
- Anneke van Giersbergen – featured vocals on "Somewhere"
- George Oosthoek – featured growls on "The Other Half (Of Me)"

== Charts ==
=== Album Charts ===
Chart (2008–2009)	Peak position
Austrian Albums (Ö3 Austria)	36
Belgian Albums (Ultratop Flanders)	16
Belgian Albums (Ultratop Wallonia)	13
Dutch Albums (Album Top 100)	3
Finnish Albums (Suomen virallinen lista)	32
French Albums (SNEP)	77
German Albums (Offizielle Top 100)	17
Japanese Albums (Oricon)	156
Portuguese Albums (AFP)	17
Swiss Albums (Schweizer Hitparade)	25
Chart (2012)	Peak position
Belgian Albums (Ultratop Flanders)	160
Chart (2019)	Peak position
UK Rock & Metal Albums (Official Charts)	33
UK Vinyl Albums Charts (OCC	39

=== Year-end album charts ===
Chart (2008)	Position
Dutch Albums (MegaCharts)	44

=== DVD Charts ===
DVDs Chart (2008)	Peak position
Austrian DVD Chart	6
Belgian DVD Chart (Flanders)	2
Belgian DVD Chart (Wallonia)	8
Dutch DVD Chart	4
Finnish DVD Chart	2
Hungarian DVD Chart	18
Spanish DVD Chart	7
Swedish DVD Chart	1
Swiss DVD Chart	1
Turkish DVD Chart	13

=== Year-end DVD charts ===
Chart (2008)	Position
Netherlands DVD Chart	28

== Certifications ==
Region	Certification	Certified units/sales
DVD
Netherlands (NVPI)	Gold	30,000^{^}
^{^} Shipments figures based on certification alone.
