= The Heart of Everything World Tour =

2007–08 concert tour by Within Temptation

- Tour by Within Temptation
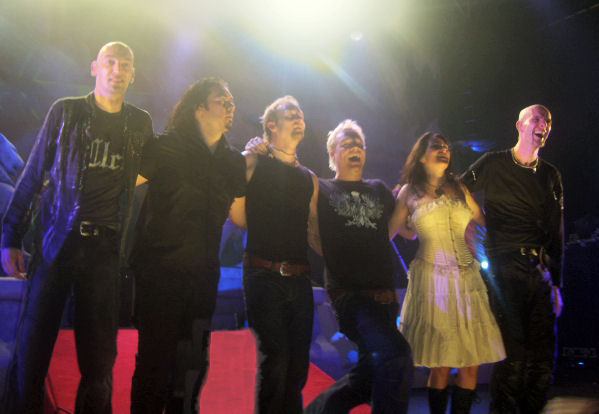
- From left to right: Jeroen van Veen, Stephen van Haestregt, Ruud Jolie, Martijn Spierenburg, Sharon den Adel, Robert Westerholt.
- Location: Asia; Europe; North America; South America
- Associated album: The Heart of Everything
- Start date: 14 March 2007
- End date: 13 September 2008
- Legs: 11

Within Temptation concert chronology
- The Silent Force Tour (2004–2006); The Heart of Everything World Tour (2007–2008); The Unforgiving Tour (2011–2013)

The Heart of Everything World Tour was a concert tour by the Dutch symphonic metal band Within Temptation in support of their fourth album, The Heart of Everything.

== Background ==
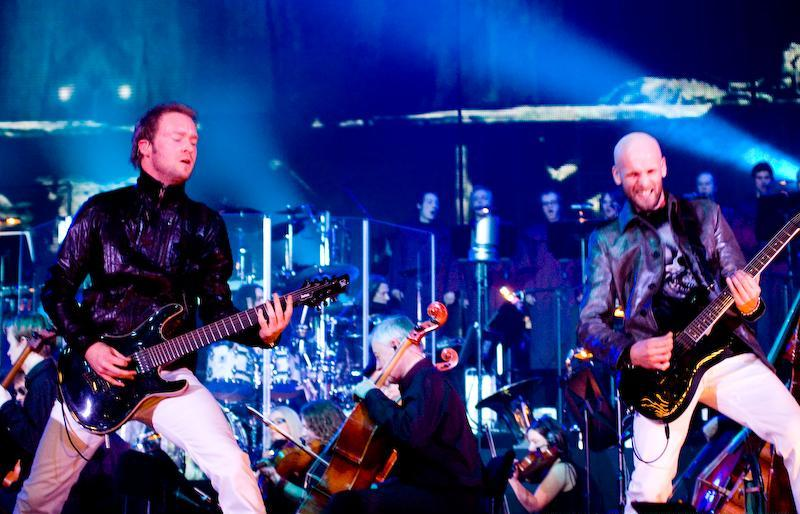
Ruud Jolie and Robert Westerholt, at the Ahoy Arena in Rotterdam.

The Heart of Everything Tour was the first world tour for the band, in which they visited South American countries, as Brazil, Argentina and Chile for the first time. The band also performed at several large European festivals, such as Pinkpop, Pukkelpop and Download which helped the band to reach the status of a mainstream band throughout Europe, as The Heart of Everything appeared in several European charts.

The band started their very first U.S. tour a few months after the European release. The band opted to present itself on metal festivals as also on mainstream festivals, due to the diversity they presents throughout their discography. of The Heart of Everything, supporting Lacuna Coil, and appearing alongside In This Moment, Stolen Babies, The Gathering, and Kylesa. The tour, dubbed The Hottest Chicks in Metal Tour 2007. Lead vocalist Sharon den Adel classified it more of an "introductional" tour, as The Heart of Everything was not released in the United States yet. And, with the release of The Heart of Everything on 24 July 2007, the band decided to kick off their first headlining US tour in Fall 2007. The band played 13 shows, starting on 5 September 2007, in Boston and ended on 23 September 2007, in Tempe, Arizona.

At the end of 2007, the band professionally recorded a sold-out show for 8,000 visitors at the Beursgebouw, in The Netherlands, for a possible future DVD. On 7 February 2008, the band performed a special show accompanied by The Metropole Orchestra, the Pa'dam Choir, and special guests including George Oosthoek (ex-Orphanage), Anneke van Giersbergen of Agua de Annique and Mina Caputo of Life of Agony filmed by 14 HD cameras at the Ahoy Arena in Rotterdam, with an attendance of 10.000 people. This recording was later released as the main show of the Black Symphony DVD, and some parts of the show in Eindhoven came as an extra on the second disc of some editions of the album. Both shows featured special stage effects like explosions, pyro and fireworks.

== Tour dates ==
Date	City	Country	Venue
Europe
14 March 2007	Amsterdam	Netherlands	Melkweg
24 March 2007	Lisbon	Portugal	Paradise Garage
25 March 2007	Madrid	Spain	La Riviera
26 March 2007	Barcelona	Spain	Sala Apolo
28 March 2007	Lyon	France	Transbordeur
29 March 2007	Milan	Italy	Alcatraz
30 March 2007	Rome	Italy	Alpheus
7 April 2007	Brussels	Belgium	Ancienne Belgique
8 April 2007	Schijndel	Netherlands	Paaspop Festival
10 April 2007	Bristol	England	Carling Academy
11 April 2007	Manchester	England	Manchester Academy 2
12 April 2007	Glasgow	Scotland	Garage
13 April 2007	Wolverhampton	England	Wulfrun Hall
14 April 2007	London	England	Astoria
19 April 2007	Copenhagen	Denmark	Vega Hall
20 April 2007	Oslo	Norway	Sentrum Scene
21 April 2007	Stockholm	Sweden	Arenan
23 April 2007	Helsinki	Finland	House of Culture
24 April 2007	Tampere	Finland	Klubi Pakkahuone
26 April 2007	Gothenburg	Sweden	Trädgårn
28 April 2007	Lille	France	Artefact Festival
29 April 2007	Strasbourg	France	Artefact Festival
The Hottest Chicks in Metal Tour 2007 (Supporting Lacuna Coil) Leg 1
7 May 2007	Louisville	United States	Headliner's Music Hall
8 May 2007	Knoxville	United States	Blue Cat's
9 May 2007	Columbia	United States	Headliners
13 May 2007	Montreal	Canada	Club Soda
15 May 2007	Quebec City	Canada	Theatre Imperial
Europe
17 May 2007	Hellendoorn	Netherlands	Dauwpop Festival
20 May 2007	Hamburg	Germany	Docks
21 May 2007	Paris	France	Bataclan
26 May 2007	Landgraaf	Netherlands	Pinkpop
The Hottest Chicks in Metal Tour 2007 (Supporting Lacuna Coil) Leg 2
29 May 2007	Seattle	United States	El Corazon
30 May 2007	Spokane	United States	The Boulevard
31 May 2007	Portland	United States	Aladdin Theater
1 June 2007	San Francisco	United States	Slim's
4 June 2007	San Luis Obispo	United States	Downtown Brewing Company
5 June 2007	Sparks	United States	New Oasis
6 June 2007	Salt Lake City	United States	Avalon Theatre
Summer Festivals
10 June 2007	Castle Donington	England	Download Festival
16 June 2007	Sibiu	Romania	ArtMania Festival
17 June 2007	Nickelsdorf	Austria	Nova Rock Festival
21 June 2007	Bilbao	Spain	Bilbao BKK Live
22 June 2007	Dessel	Belgium	Graspop Metal Meeting
23 June 2007	Broek Op Langedijk	Netherlands	Indian Summer Festival
24 June 2007	Clisson	France	Hellfest
Asia
3 July 2007	Osaka	Japan	Big Cat
4 July 2007	Tokyo	Japan	Shibuya Ax
Summer Festivals
7 July 2007	Burgum	Netherlands	Waldrock Festival
12 July 2007	Arvika	Sweden	Arvikafestivalen
14 July 2007	Vaasa	Finland	Rockperry Festival
21 July 2007	Kreuth	Germany	Earthshaker Fest
28 July 2007	Lichtenvoorde	Netherlands	Zwarte Cross
8 August 2007	Budapest	Hungary	Sziget Festival
10 August 2007	Skanderborg	Denmark	Skanderborg Festival
16 August 2007	Gampel	Switzerland	Open Air Gampel
17 August 2007	Hasselt	Belgium	Pukkelpop Festival
1 September 2007	Istanbul	Turkey	Rock 'n Coke Festival
North America
5 September 2007	Boston	United States	Paradise Lounge
7 September 2007	New York City	United States	Irving Plaza
8 September 2007	Towson	United States	Recher Theatre
9 September 2007	Philadelphia	United States	Theater of the Living Arts
11 September 2007	Toronto	Canada	Mod Club Theatre
12 September 2007	Cleveland	United States	House of Blues
14 September 2007	Detroit	United States	St. Andrew's Hall
15 September 2007	Chicago	United States	House of Blues
16 September 2007	Saint Paul	United States	Station 4
18 September 2007	Denver	United States	Quixotes
21 September 2007	San Francisco	United States	Slim's
22 September 2007	Los Angeles	United States	Avalon
23 September 2007	Tempe	United States	Marquee Theatre
Europe
1 October 2007	Munich	Germany	Tonhalle
2 October 2007	Zürich	Switzerland	Xtra
3 October 2007	Vienna	Austria	Gasometer
5 October 2007	Leipzig	Germany	Haus Auensee
6 October 2007	Berlin	Germany	Columbiahalle
8 October 2007	Paris	France	Zénith de Paris
9 October 2007	Stuttgart	Germany	Congresscentrum B
10 October 2007	Cologne	Germany	E-Werk
27 October 2007	Amsterdam	Netherlands	Heineken Music Hall
15 November 2007	Utrecht	Netherlands	Tivoli De Helling
21 November 2007	Tilburg	Netherlands	013
22 November 2007	Tilburg	Netherlands	013
24 November 2007	Eindhoven	Netherlands	Beursgebouw
27 November 2007	London	England	O2 Academy Brixton
28 November 2007	Birmingham	England	O2 Academy Birmingham
29 November 2007	Manchester	England	Manchester Academy
30 November 2007	Glasgow	Scotland	Barrowlands
10 January 2008	Bologna	Italy	Estragon
11 January 2008	Milan	Italy	Live Club
12 January 2008	Karlsruhe	Germany	Europahalle
13 January 2008	Graz	Austria	Orpheum
14 January 2008	Zagreb	Croatia	Tvornica Kulture
16 January 2008	Warsaw	Poland	Stodola
17 January 2008	Prague	Czech Republic	Roxy
18 January 2008	Budapest	Hungary	Petofi Csarnok
19 January 2008	Ljubljana	Slovenia	VPK
7 February 2008	Rotterdam	Netherlands	Rotterdam Ahoy
17 February 2008	Moscow	Russia	Shadow Club
8 March 2008	Granada	Spain	Atarfe Vega Rock Festival
23 March 2008	Schijndel	Netherlands	Paaspop Festival
Latin America
3 April 2008	Mexico City	Mexico	Circo Volador
4 April 2008	Monterrey	Mexico	Cafe Iguana
5 April 2008	Guadalajara	Mexico	Teatro Cavaret
8 April 2008	Manizales	Colombia	Teatro Fundadores
9 April 2008	Bogotá	Colombia	Teatro Jorge Eliécer Gaitán
11 April 2008	Santiago	Chile	Teatro Caupolicán
12 April 2008	Buenos Aires	Argentina	Teatro Flores
13 April 2008	São Bernardo do Campo	Brazil	Espaço Lux
Summer Festivals
5 May 2008	Zwolle	Netherlands	Bevrijdingspop Festival
23 May 2008	Ureterp	Netherlands	Oerrock
30 May 2008	Bathmen	Netherlands	Bekefeesten
31 May 2008	Madrid	Spain	Electric Weekend
7 June 2008	Huttwil	Switzerland	Rock Sound Festival
13 June 2008	Hazerswoude-Dorp	Netherlands	Egelantier Live
14 June 2008	Leusden	Netherlands	Puddingpop Festival
15 June 2008	Castle Donington	England	Download Festival
20 June 2008	Ermelo	Netherlands	Multipop Festival
27 June 2008	Dischingen	Germany	Rock am Härtsfeldsee
5 July 2008	Twickenham	England	Twickenham Stadium
9 July 2008	Athens	Greece	Rockwave Festival
11 July 2008	Oeiras	Portugal	Optimus Alive!
13 July 2008	Vizovice	Czech Republic	Masters of Rock Festival
19 July 2008	Osterode am Harz	Germany	Rock Harz Open Air
26 July 2008	Oulu	Finland	Q Stock Festival
15 July 2008	Hasselt	Belgium	Pukkelpop Festival
2 August 2008	Mariestad	Sweden	Klubb Kaliber Fyller Fem
6 August 2008	Utrecht	Netherlands	Tivoli
14 August 2008	Arras	France	Rock En France
15 August 2008	Hasselt	Belgium	Pukkelpop Festival
16 August 2008	Assen	Netherlands	TT Circuit Assen
17 August 2008	Jonschwil	Switzerland	Degenaupark
30 August 2008	The Hague	Netherlands	Beatstad Festival
1 September 2008	Kherson	Ukraine	kRock u Maybutje, Park Slavy
3 September 2008	Kyiv	Ukraine	CKM NAU
13 September 2008	Tiel	Netherlands	Appelpop Festival

== Personnel ==
=== Within Temptation ===
- Sharon den Adel – vocals
- Robert Westerholt – rhythm guitar
- Ruud Jolie – lead guitar
- Martijn Spierenburg – keyboards
- Jeroen van Veen – bass guitar
- Stephen van Haestregt – drums

=== Guest musicians ===
- Anneke van Giersbergen – featured vocals on "Somewhere" on 24 November 2007 and 7 February 2008
- George Oosthoek – featured vocals on "The Other Half (Of Me)" on 24 November 2007 and 7 February 2008
- Mina Caputo – featured vocals on "What Have You Done" on 7 February 2008
