= The Silent Force Tour =

2004–06 concert tour by Within Temptation

- Tour by Within Temptation
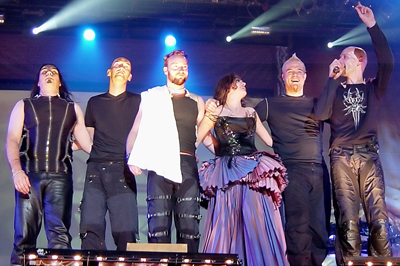
- The band formation during the tour. From left to right: Stephen van Haestregt, Jeroen van Veen, Ruud Jolie, Sharon den Adel, Martijn Spierenburg, Robert Westerholt.
- Associated album: The Silent Force
- Start date: 2 July 2004
- End date: 15 October 2006

Within Temptation concert chronology
- Mother Earth Tour (2000–2003); The Silent Force Tour (2004–2006); The Heart of Everything World Tour (2007–2008)

The Silent Force Tour was a concert tour by the Dutch symphonic metal band Within Temptation in support of their third album, The Silent Force. The international growth the band had been facing with the album reflected well on the touring schedule and the locations played, as the band started being able to play in several newly visited countries and at bigger music festivals, such as the Download Festival in the United Kingdom, Wacken Open Air in Germany and the Loud Park Festival in Japan. The concert at the Java-eiland, in Amsterdam, was recorded and released homonymously under the name The Silent Force Tour in November 2005.

== Background ==
Within Temptation's third album, The Silent Force, was released on 15 November 2004. The album was an instant number one debut on the band's homecountry and charted well in many other European countries. In support of the release they embarked on another large international tour in 2005, with dates across Europe and a one-off show in Dubai and another in Japan. A special concert at the Java-eiland, Netherlands, was recorded and released as a DVD, entitled The Silent Force Tour. The concert included special guests, as old Within Temptation members in some songs. The band also showed heavy presence at summer music festivals, including their first presentation at the Download Festival in the United Kingdom and also headlining the 2005 edition of the also British Bloodstock Open Air.

== Tour dates ==
| Date | City | Country | Venue |
|---|---|---|---|
Warm-Up
| 2 July 2004 | Roskilde | Denmark | Roskilde Festival |
| 3 July 2004 | Werchter | Belgium | Rock Werchter |
| 24 July 2004 | Heeswijk | Netherlands | Natuurtheater De Kersouwe |
| 31 July 2004 | Hultsfred | Sweden | Gates of Metal |
| 29 September 2004 | London | England | Scala |
| 8 November 2004 | Paris | France | Bataclan |
Europe – First Leg
| 25 November 2004 | Eindhoven | Netherlands | Effenaar |
| 27 November 2004 | Zwolle | Netherlands | Broerenkerk |
| 2 December 2004 | Amsterdam | Netherlands | Melkweg |
| 10 December 2004 | Hardenberg | Netherlands | Podium |
| 19 December 2004 | Ghent | Belgium | Zooruti |
| 1 February 2005 | Hamburg | Germany | Grosse Freiheit 36 |
| 3 February 2005 | Malmö | Sweden | Kulturbolaget |
| 5 February 2005 | Gothenburg | Sweden | Karen Club |
| 7 February 2005 | Stockholm | Sweden | Fryshuset |
| 12 February 2005 | Berlin | Germany | Columbiahalle |
| 15 February 2005 | Munich | Germany | Tonhalle |
| 16 February 2005 | Zürich | Switzerland | Volkshaus |
| 24 February 2005 | Wiesbaden | Germany | Schlachthof |
| 28 February 2005 | Strasbourg | France | La Laiterie |
| 1 March 2005 | Villeurbanne | France | Le Transbordeur |
| 3 March 2005 | Barcelona | Spain | Razzmatazz |
| 4 March 2005 | Madrid | Spain | Sala Macumba |
| 25 March 2005 | Dubai | United Arab Emirates | Dubai Desert Rock Festival |
| 27 March 2005 | Schijndel | Netherlands | Paaspop |
| 12 April 2005 | Utrecht | Netherlands | Tivoli |
| 15 April 2005 | Amsterdam | Netherlands | Paradiso |
| 21 April 2005 | Tilburg | Netherlands | 013 |
| 22 April 2005 | Rijssen | Netherlands | Lucky & Co |
| 29 April 2005 | Zundert | Netherlands | Zundert |
Summer Festivals
| 5 May 2005 | Zwolle | Netherlands | Bevrijdingsfestival |
| 15 May 2005 | Landgraaf | Netherlands | Pinkpop |
| 22 May 2005 | Dortmund | Germany | Soundgarden |
| 3 June 2005 | Nürburg | Germany | Rock am Ring |
| 9 June 2005 | Norje | Sweden | Sweden Rock Festival |
| 11 June 2005 | Dresden | Germany | Messe |
| 12 June 2005 | Zürich | Switzerland | Stadion Buchholz Uster |
| 17 June 2005 | Emmen | Netherlands | Megapop |
| 24 June 2005 | Dessel | Belgium | Graspop Metal Meeting |
| 25 June 2005 | Paris | France | Parc des Princes |
| 26 June 2005 | The Hague | Netherlands | Parkpop |
| 3 July 2005 | Weert | Netherlands | Bospop |
| 4 July 2005 | Barcelona | Spain | Razzmatazz |
| 5 July 2005 | Madrid | Spain | La Riviera |
| 7 July 2005 | Valencia | Spain | Estación del Norte |
| 22 July 2005 | Amsterdam | Netherlands | Java-eiland ^{[A]} |
| 5 August 2005 | Wacken | Germany | Wacken Open Air |
Europe – Second Leg
| 27 August 2005 | Helsinki | Finland | Kaisaniemi Park |
| 3 September 2005 | Derby | England | Assembly Rooms |
| 4 September 2005 | London | England | London Astoria |
| 10 September 2005 | Tiel | Netherlands | Appelpop |
| 17 September 2005 | Steenwijk | Netherlands | Theater de Meenthe |
Summer Festivals 2
| 22 April 2006 | America | Netherlands | Rockweekend |
| 5 May 2006 | Wessem | Netherlands | Feesttent Wessem |
| 26 May 2006 | Bathmen | Netherlands | Bêkefeesten |
| 10 June 2006 | Donington Park | England | Download Festival |
| 15 June 2006 | Hultsfred | Sweden | Hultsfred Festival |
| 16 June 2006 | Seinäjoki | Finland | Provinssirock |
| 8 July 2006 | Huttwil | Switzerland | Nationales Sportzentrum |
| 14 July 2006 | Dour | Belgium | La Plaine de La Machine à Feu |
| 15 July 2006 | Toscolano-Maderno | Italy | Evolution Festival |
| 16 July 2006 | Vizovice | Czech Republic | Masters of Rock |
| 30 July 2006 | Guernica | Spain | Metalway |
| 8 August 2006 | Lokeren | Belgium | Lokerse Feesten |
| 12 August 2006 | Lokeren | Netherlands | Huntenpop Festival |
| 13 August 2006 | Hildesheim | Germany | M'era Luna Festival |
| 23 August 2006 | Leipzig | Germany | Spellborn Convention^{[B]} |
| 8 September 2006 | Tiel | Netherlands | Appelpop |
| 12 September 2006 | Veldhoven | Netherlands | Centrum special club show |
| 23 September 2006 | Veldhoven | Netherlands | Cult & Tumult Festival |
| 15 October 2006 | Saitama | Japan | Loud Park Festival |

- A Official recording of The Silent Force Tour DVD.
- B Special presentation at The Chronicles of Spellborn game release.

== Personnel ==
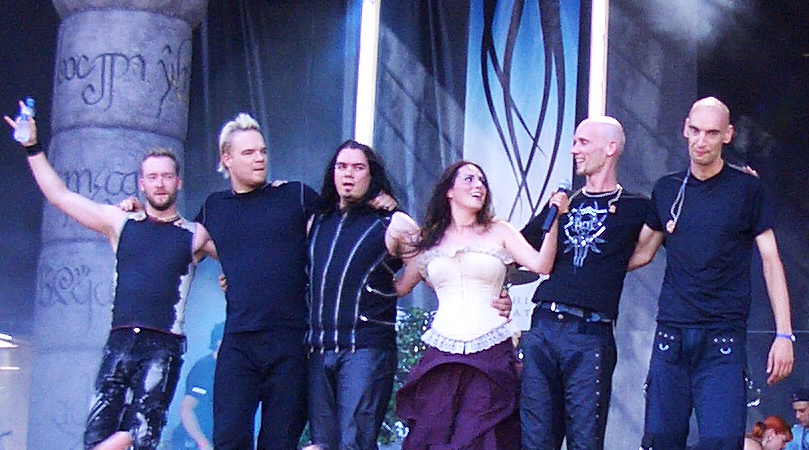
Left to right: Jolie, Spierenburg, Haestregt, den Adel, Westerholt, J. van Veen.

Within Temptation

- Sharon den Adel – vocals
- Robert Westerholt – rhythm guitar
- Ruud Jolie – lead guitar
- Martijn Spierenburg – keyboards
- Jeroen van Veen – bass guitar
- Stephen van Haestregt – drums
