= Hand of Sorrow =

Song by Within Temptation

from the album The Heart of Everything
- Released: 9 March 2007
- Genre: Symphonic metal
- Length: 5:36
- Label: GUN/Roadrunner
- Songwriters: Sharon den Adel; Robert Westerholt; Martijn Spierenburg

"Hand of Sorrow" is a song by Dutch symphonic metal band Within Temptation taken from their fourth album The Heart of Everything. The song is part of the promotion for their 2008 live DVD, Black Symphony, according to their web page, as well as "Forgiven", which was released as a single.

On September 17, 2008, the band released a new webpage, blacksymphony.nl, for further promotion of the DVD. On this page a competition was announced, where fans were encouraged to make their own music video for Hand of Sorrow, based on the live performance from the DVD. The winner was to have their contribution become the official music video for the song and would be invited (from anywhere in the world) with a friend to Within Temptation's seated show in Haarlem on November 27 with VIP tickets, as well as having dinner with Sharon den Adel and Robert Westerholt, and would have a get-together with the whole band after the show. The winner would also receive a Within Temptation merchandise pack. The winner would be flown to and from Amsterdam, and transport from the airport to the hotel where they will be staying for two nights, and to the venue, would be provided. If the winner should be Dutch or Belgian, they would receive a Panasonic HD TV and Blu-ray DVD player in lieu of the flight costs, as well as a signed Black Symphony Blu-ray disc.

The 10 next best videos was rewarded with a package containing a T-shirt and a signed ‘Black Symphony’ Special Edition.

There was also a prize for the most viewed video. The most viewed video received a Panasonic Blu-ray player with a signed ‘Black Symphony’ Blu-ray Disc.

On November 10, 2008, the band announced the winners for the competition. The video, featuring the live performance of the song, then became a second trailer for the DVD, in the same manner as the first trailer, which featured the performance of the song "Our Solemn Hour".

== Inspiration ==
According to Within Temptation vocalist Sharon den Adel, "the lyrics of 'The hand of Sorrow' were inspired by Robin Hobb's 'The Farseer Trilogy'. It is the tale of FitzChivalry Farseer. The thing which inspired us was the feeling of being torn between your own dreams and higher goals in life and the sacrifices those goals take to achieve them. What also runs through this story are moral questions like 'is violence appropriate, just when it can prevent more violence."
