= The Howling (EP) =

EP by Within Temptation
- Released: (United States) 1 May 2007
- Genre: Symphonic metal; alternative metal
- Label: Roadrunner
- Producer: Daniel Gibson

Within Temptation EPs chronology
The Dance (1998)	The Howling (2007)	Paradise (What About Us?) (2013)

Within Temptation singles chronology
"What Have You Done" (2007)	"The Howling" (2007)	"Frozen" (2007)

Professional ratings
Review scores
Source	Rating
Metal Storm	(8.9/10)
Live-Metal.net	8/10 stars

"The Howling" is a song by Dutch symphonic metal band Within Temptation. It was released as an EP on 1 May 2007, exclusively at Hot Topic stores in the United States. It was also used as the second promotional single for The Heart of Everything, digitally released in the United Kingdom while "Frozen" was released elsewhere in Europe.

== History ==
"The Howling" was the first song revealed from Within Temptation's album The Heart of Everything. It was written to promote the video game The Chronicles of Spellborn. A video trailer for the game using "The Howling" was released in 2006. The band also played the song live at several occasions in 2006.

On 1 May 2007, before The Heart of Everything was released in the United States, an EP for the song went on sale there. After being available for a few hours, the EP had already sold out on the Hot Topic website. Later in 2007, it was released as the second single from The Heart Of Everything in countries where "Frozen" was not released. A new video was shot for this release.

Sharon den Adel's vocal range on "The Howling" is C-flat4 – E5.

== Track listing ==
All lyrics are written by Sharon den Adel and Robert Westerholt.

No.	Title	Music	Length
1.	"The Howling"	Westerholt; Daniel Gibson	5:36
2.	"Stand My Ground"	Gibson; Han Kooreneef	4:28
3.	"Angels"	den Adel; Spierenburg	4:02
4.	"Jillian (I'd Give My Heart)"	den Adel; Spierenburg	4:47
5.	"Memories"	den Adel; Spierenburg	3:51
6.	"What Have You Done" (feat. Keith Caputo) (US Single Version) (Music video)	Westerholt; Daniel Gibson	3:24

The other four tracks on the EP are popular singles from Within Temptation's third studio album, The Silent Force. The disc is also an Enhanced CD which contains special music video for "What Have You Done".

Although "The Howling" was released in other countries as well, no other physical single was released.

== Music video ==
The first video for "The Howling" was a trailer for The Chronicles of Spellborn. It features scenes of Sharon den Adel (Within Temptation's lead singer) and footage from The Chronicles of Spellborn. Besides online showcase, the video was only released on The Heart of Everything special edition DVD.

The second video for "The Howling" displayed Sharon den Adel in a beautiful, sunlit field. It quickly changed into a darker scene, following the progression from a soft, calm sound into a more metal form. Den Adel is joined by the other band members in the dark scenes. The rest of the video switches between the two scenes. Instead of the album version, this video portrays the shortened single version of "The Howling".

Although the EP went on sale in May 2007 in the United States, it was not until October that a new version of its music video was revealed by Roadrunner Records US. This version portrays a different edit of "The Howling" than the main music video.
