= An Acoustic Night at the Theatre =

Live album by Within Temptation
- Released: 30 October 2009 – 2 November 2009 (Europe); 15 December 2009 (US)
- Recorded: 30 November 2008
- Venue: Muziekcentrum Frits Philips (Eindhoven)
- Genre: Symphonic rock, acoustic rock
- Label: Sony

Within Temptation chronology
Black Symphony (2008)	An Acoustic Night at the Theatre (2009)	The Unforgiving (2011)

Singles from An Acoustic Night at the Theatre
- 1. "Utopia" Released: 23 October 2009

Professional ratings
Review scores
Source	Rating
About.com	4/5 stars
BBC UK	positive
Rock Sound	4/5 stars
Sputnikmusic	3/5 stars
Ultimate-Guitar	4.3/5

An Acoustic Night at the Theatre is the fourth live album by Dutch symphonic metal band Within Temptation that has been released in October–November 2009.

== History ==
The album is made up of the acoustic set at Eindhoven's Muziekcentrum Frits Philips, from the band's Theatre Tour, on 30 November 2008. It also includes a new studio recording, "Utopia", a duet with Chris Jones, which was released as a single on 23 October 2009. Drummer Mike Coolen performed on the acoustic set: he later became the band's full-time drummer, replacing Stephen van Haestregt who moved on to new band My Favorite Scar.

== Track listing ==
1. "Towards the End" (Sharon Den Adel, Martijn Spierenburg, Robert Westerholt) – 3:27
2. "Stand My Ground" (Den Adel, Daniel Gibson, Han Kooreneef, Westerholt) – 3:53
3. "Caged" (Den Adel) – 5:19
4. "All I Need" (Den Adel, Westerholt) – 5:20
5. "Frozen" (Den Adel, Gibson, Westerholt) – 4:31
6. "Somewhere" (feat. Anneke van Giersbergen) (DenAdel, Westerholt) – 4:19
7. "The Cross" (Den Adel, Spierenburg, Westerholt) – 4:57
8. "Pale" (Den Adel, Westerholt) – 5:08
9. "What Have You Done" (feat. Mina Caputo) (Den Adel, Gibson, Westerholt) – 4:33
10. "Memories" (Den Adel, Spierenburg, Westerholt) – 4:00
11. "Forgiven" (Den Adel, Spierenburg, Westerholt) – 4:42
12. "Utopia" (feat. Chris Jones) (Den Adel, Gibson) – 3:49

=== Bonus tracks ===
13. "Utopia" (Demo version) – 4:31 (Amazon MP3 Germany)
13. "Hand of Sorrow" (Live in Eindhoven 2007) – 5:43 (iTunes)
13. "Restless" (acoustic version) – 5:58 (Play.com MP3 UK) (Roadrunner Records Japan CD)

== Personnel ==
=== Performance ===
- Peter Brandt – engineer
- Jules Buckley – conductor, orchestral arrangements
- Rayann Elzein – photography
- Daniel Gibson – arranger, composer, producer
- Stefan Glaumann – mixing
- Olivia Jehel – photography
- Juno Jimmink – engineer, editing
- Han Kooreneef – composer
- Patrick Mühren – mixing
- Red Limo String Quartet – violin, cello
- Within Temptation – producer

=== Within Temptation ===
- Mike Coolen – percussion, drums
- Sharon den Adel – composer, vocals
- Ruud Jolie – guitar
- Martijn Spierenburg – composer, keyboards, engineer, editing
- Stephen Van Haestregt – drums
- Jeroen van Veen – bass
- Robert Westerholt – guitar, composer

=== Guest artists ===
- Mina Caputo – vocals
- Chris Jones – vocals
- Anneke van Giersbergen – vocals

== Charts ==
Chart (2009)	Peak position
Dutch Albums Chart	4
Portuguese Albums Chart	28
Belgian Albums Chart (Flanders)	31
Swiss Albums Chart	35
Austrian Albums Chart	38
Greek Albums Chart	44
German Albums Chart	46
Belgian Albums Chart (Wallonia)	47
Spanish Albums Chart	74
French Albums Chart	89
