= The Heart of Everything =

- Cover photography by Erwin Olaf

Studio album by Within Temptation
- Released: 12 March 2007
- Recorded: May – November 2006
- Studio: The Metal Cemetery; Studio Arnold Mühren, Volendam; Soundpark Studio, Schiedam, Netherlands; Barrandov Studios, Prague, Czech Republic
- Genre: Symphonic metal; gothic metal
- Length: 57:06
- Label: GUN (Europe); Roadrunner (rest of the world)
- Producer: Daniel Gibson; Stefan Helleblad

Within Temptation chronology
The Silent Force (2004)	The Heart of Everything (2007)	The Unforgiving (2011)

Singles from The Heart of Everything
- 1. "What Have You Done" Released: 14 February 2007; 2. "The Howling" Released: 1 May 2007; 3. "Frozen" Released: 11 June 2007; 4. "All I Need" Released: 12 November 2007; 5. "Forgiven" Released: 12 September 2008

The Heart of Everything is the fourth studio album by Dutch symphonic metal band Within Temptation. It was released on 12 March 2007 in Europe by GUN Records and on 18 June 2007 in North America by Roadrunner Records. The album follows the symphonic metal sound the band had been improving and deepening until then, and is considered by lead vocalist Sharon den Adel as the album in which the band finally managed to achieve this kind of sound.

The album originated a total of five singles. The first and most successful one, "What Have You Done", was released on 14 February and was met with moderate chart success across Europe. The second single was "The Howling", released on 1 May exclusively in the United States. The third single, "Frozen", was released in Europe on 11 June. The fourth single, "All I Need", was released on 11 November. In order to promote the album the band embarked on their first world tour, entitled The Heart of Everything World Tour, visiting countries in Europe, North America, South America, and Asia. The track "Forgiven" was released as a single on 12 September 2008 for promoting the live album Black Symphony, recorded during the tour.

The album was met with commercial and critical success, earning positive reviews from publications such as Metal Hammer, AllMusic and PopMatters. It opened at number 1 on the Dutch Charts and entered top ten positions in countries such as Belgium, Finland, Germany, Sweden and Switzerland. It was also the first Within Temptation album to enter the Billboard 200 charts, peaking at the number 106.

== Composition and recording ==
Composing for the album started at the end of 2005, and recording lasted for half 2006. About their inspiration, the band cited books as well as important moments of their personal lives, mainly the act of making choices. About certain songs, like Our Solemn Hour, lead vocalist Sharon den Adel wrote about how "people get sacrificed also for war and we don't learn from that." About their second single, "Frozen", den Adel said that they "wrote a song about child abuse", so they released the song as a single and gave all the profits to the Child Helpline International. In den Adel's words: "We chose this organization because they are represented in 160 countries and it is very easy to get in contact with them. You can send them an e-mail or call. They are there not only to help, but also to just listen, and you can decide how much help you want."

As the album focuses on some of the difficult choices people make throughout their lives, the band decided to reflect this theme by depicting Lady Justice on the cover, a figure known to symbolize the weighing of moral decisions. The artwork was done by Dutch artist Erwin Olaf.

== Release and promotion ==
The full track listing was revealed on 10 January 2007 and the album was released on 9 March 2007 in the Netherlands, and on 24 July in the United States. This was their first album released in North America, due to the upgrading recognition they were earning throughout Europe. Roadrunner Records decided to put the song "Stand My Ground", taken from their former album The Silent Force, on the American edition of the album as a means to interest people on the band's earlier albums that were later released. Roadrunner Records also released a limited edition EP called The Howling, which was available only at Hot Topic stores, containing the title track plus popular tracks from The Silent Force. Album opener "The Howling" and "Sounds of Freedom" were recorded as promotional material for the video game The Chronicles of Spellborn.

Sharon den Adel performing "What Have You Done" during The Heart of Everything World Tour.

Promotion was intense for the album and included their first world tour, entitled The Heart of Everything World Tour, which started 14 March 2007, in Amsterdam and ended only on 13 September 2008. The band toured in the United States of America for the first time, first supporting Lacuna Coil and then as headliners. About the American tour, den Adel said that "Well, we don't have any expectations because it's such a big country and you never know where people will like your music. It's totally different tastes and we're going to come over here and play and see if people will like it. You can't change [it] if they don't. And if they do, then it's another nice country we can go and play at and enjoy the culture." The band also visited South American countries, such as Brazil, Argentina and Chile for the first time. The band continued to perform at several large European festivals, such as Pinkpop, Pukkelpop and Download which helped the band to reach the status of a mainstream band throughout Europe, as The Heart of Everything appeared in several European charts. At the end of 2007, the band professionally recorded a sold-out show for 8,000 visitors at the Beursgebouw, in The Netherlands, for a possible future DVD release. On 7 February 2008, the band performed a special show accompanied by The Metropole Orchestra, the Pa'dam Choir, and special guests including George Oosthoek (ex-Orphanage), Anneke van Giersbergen and Keith Caputo of Life of Agony, filmed by 14 HD cameras at the Ahoy Arena in Rotterdam, with an attendance of 10.000 people. This recording was later released as the main show of the Black Symphony DVD, and some parts of the show in Eindhoven came as an extra on the second disc of some editions of the album. Both shows featured special stage effects like explosions, pyro and fireworks.

== Reception ==
Professional ratings
Review scores
Source	Rating
About.com	4/5 stars
AllMusic	3.5/5 stars
Brave Words & Bloody Knuckles	3.5/5 stars
Metal Hammer (Ger)	6/7
Metal Storm	3/5 stars
Metallized	80/100
Planet Internet	(favorable)
PopMatters	3.5/5 stars
Rock Hard	4/5 stars

The criticism of The Heart of Everything was generally positive, with particular praise for the symphonic elements and Sharon den Adel's vocals. Chad Bowar of About.com praised the use of different elements on the album, while saying that the album has "the optimum balance of the melody and hooks of mainstream rock, the depth and complexity of classical music and the dark edge of gothic metal." AllMusic review highlighted how "the sextet isn't afraid to get downright symphonic". Mark Gromen, from Brave Words & Bloody Knuckles, praised specially the track "Our Solemn Hour" by offering "an accurate portrayal of what Within Temptation are all about, (...) grandiose, orchestral and rocking, it encompasses all aspects of the band." Gromen also lamented the "ignorant comparisons" with Evanescence the band started to achieve, while entering the North American marketing after a successful European career. Metal Storm reviewer was less favorable, stating that "it's simply hard to find amazing songs, real hits. Of course if you're not looking for something new and a bit deep, it should be ok but on the other hand I didn't find anything special on this release." and finished the review saying that "this is not the worst album ever but Within Temptation is able to do something better."

The album ranked 20th position on the list of 2007 Best Metal Albums delivered by international online magazine PopMatters. In September 2015, the Official Charts Company, responsible for the music industry reports in the United Kingdom, launched a new category of chart in which indicates the best selling albums that push the conceptions and boundaries of traditional music. OCC then elected the Top 30 Progressive Artists of the 21st Century previous to the chart release, putting Within Temptation at the 27th position with The Heart of Everything.

=== Critics' lists ===
Critic/Publication	List	Rank	Ref.
PopMatters	Best Metal Albums of 2007	20	

== Track listings ==
All lyrics are written by Sharon den Adel and Robert Westerholt, except where noted.

Standard edition
No.	Title	Music	Length
1.	"The Howling"	Westerholt; Daniel Gibson	5:33
2.	"What Have You Done" (featuring Keith Caputo)	Westerholt; Gibson	5:16
3.	"Frozen"	Westerholt; Gibson	4:28
4.	"Our Solemn Hour"	den Adel; Martijn Spierenburg	4:17
5.	"The Heart of Everything"	Westerholt; Gibson; Han Kooreneef	5:35
6.	"Hand of Sorrow"	den Adel; Spierenburg	5:36
7.	"The Cross"	den Adel; Spierenburg	4:52
8.	"Final Destination"	Westerholt; Gibson	4:43
9.	"All I Need"	den Adel	4:51
10.	"The Truth Beneath the Rose"	den Adel; Spierenburg	7:03
11.	"Forgiven"	den Adel; Spierenburg	4:52
Total length:			57:06

European iTunes Store edition bonus tracks
No.	Title	Music	Length
12.	"Memories" (Live)	den Adel; Spierenburg	3:54
13.	"Angels" (Live)	den Adel; Spierenburg	4:04
14.	"Stand My Ground" (Live)	Gibson; Kooreneef	4:29
Total length:			69:33

Yellow and pink special editions bonus tracks
No.	Title	Music	Length
12.	"What Have You Done" (Rock Mix)	Westerholt; Gibson	3:54
13.	"What Have You Done" (Acoustic)	Westerholt; Gibson	4:12
14.	"Ice Queen" (Acoustic; lyrics: den Adel)	Westerholt	4:31
15.	"Stand My Ground" (Acoustic)	Gibson; Kooreneef	3:43
Total length:			72:26

Pink special edition exclusive bonus track
No.	Title	Length
16.	"What Have You Done" (European radio version) a.k.a. (European mainstream mix)	4:01
Total length:		76:27

Yellow special edition DVD
No.	Title	Length
1.	"Our Solemn Hour" (Live at The Shibuya AX, Tokyo, Japan, 4 July 2007)
2.	"The Howling" (Live at The Shibuya AX, Tokyo, Japan, 4 July 2007)
3.	"Frozen" (Live at The Shibuya AX, Tokyo, Japan, 4 July 2007)
4.	"Stand My Ground" (Live at The Shibuya AX, Tokyo, Japan, 4 July 2007)
5.	"The Cross" (Live at The Shibuya AX, Tokyo, Japan, 4 July 2007)
6.	"The Heart of Everything" (Live at The Shibuya AX, Tokyo, Japan, 4 July 2007)
7.	"Mother Earth" (Live at The Shibuya AX, Tokyo, Japan, 4 July 2007)
8.	"Deceiver of Fools" (Live at The Shibuya AX, Tokyo, Japan, 4 July 2007)
9.	"Ice Queen" (Live at The Shibuya AX, Tokyo, Japan, 4 July 2007)
10.	"The Howling" (Game trailer for The Chronicles of Spellborn)
11.	"What Have You Done" (Music video)
12.	"Frozen" (Music video)
13.	"The Howling" (Music video)
14.	"What Have You Done" (US video version)

North American standard edition
No.	Title	Length
1.	"The Howling"	5:33
2.	"What Have You Done" (US Single Version)	3:24
3.	"Frozen"	4:28
4.	"Our Solemn Hour"	4:17
5.	"The Heart of Everything"	5:35
6.	"Hand of Sorrow"	5:36
7.	"The Cross"	4:52
8.	"Final Destination"	4:43
9.	"All I Need"	4:51
10.	"Stand My Ground"	4:28
11.	"The Truth Beneath the Rose"	7:03
12.	"Forgiven"	4:52
13.	"What Have You Done" (Extended version)	5:16
Total length:		64:58

North American iTunes Store bonus tracks
No.	Title	Music	Length
14.	"Blue Eyes"	Westerholt; Spierenburg	5:26
15.	"Sounds of Freedom"	Westerholt; Spierenburg	4:58
16.	"Ice Queen" (Acoustic at "MXL")		3:51
17.	"What Have You Done" (Acoustic)		4:00
18.	"The Cross" (Acoustic)		4:59
Total length:			88:12

Note

- The original version of "What Have You Done" is named "Extended Version" and the US edit is named "US Single Version" on the North American edition

Instrumental Edition (available at the U.S. iTunes Store)
No.	Title	Music	Length
1.	"The Howling" (Instrumental)	Westerholt; Daniel Gibson	5:39
2.	"What Have You Done" (Instrumental)	Westerholt; Gibson	5:14
3.	"Frozen" (Instrumental)	Westerholt; Gibson	4:29
4.	"Our Solemn Hour" (Instrumental)	den Adel; Spierenburg	4:18
5.	"The Heart of Everything" (Instrumental)	Westerholt; Gibson; Han Kooreneef	5:38
6.	"Hand of Sorrow" (Instrumental)	den Adel; Spierenburg	5:38
7.	"The Cross" (Instrumental)	den Adel; Spierenburg	4:52
8.	"Final Destination" (Instrumental)	Westerholt; Gibson	4:46
9.	"All I Need" (Instrumental)	den Adel	4:54
10.	"The Truth Beneath the Rose" (Instrumental)	den Adel; Spierenburg	7:06
11.	"Forgiven" (Instrumental)	den Adel; Spierenburg	4:55
12.	"What Have You Done" (Single version) (instrumental)	Westerholt; Gibson	4:03
Total length:			61:32

== Singles ==
Five singles have been released from the album:

- "What Have You Done" (five different versions), released in February 2007.
- "The Howling" (both as an EP, released in the US on 1 May 2007, and as a co-release with "Frozen").
- "Frozen" (standard and maxi versions), released on 11 June 2007.
- "All I Need" (standard and maxi versions), released on 12 November 2007.
- "Forgiven" (maxi version) was released on 12 September 2008 to promote the Black Symphony release.

=== B-sides and demos ===
The following songs have appeared in released singles during The Heart of Everything promotion. The released demos have extreme differences, lyrically and musically (and often named differently) to the originals.

- "Blue Eyes" (available on the European maxi CD single of What Have You Done)
- "Sounds of Freedom" (available on the maxi CD single of Frozen)
- "The Last Time" (demo, available on the All I Need single)
- "Frozen" (demo, available on the All I Need single)
- "Our Solemn Hour" (demo, available on the All I Need single)
- "Hand of Sorrow" (demo, available on the All I Need single)

== Personnel ==
=== Within Temptation ===
- Sharon den Adel – lead vocals
- Robert Westerholt – rhythm guitar, harsh vocals & growls
- Ruud Jolie – lead guitar, acoustic guitar, mandolin, backing vocals
- Martijn Spierenburg – keyboards, choir and orchestra arrangements
- Jeroen van Veen – bass
- Stephen van Haestregt – drums

=== Additional musicians ===
- Keith Caputo – vocals on "What Have You Done" (all versions)
- Jonas Pap – cello on "The Cross", "All I Need" and "Forgiven"
- Tom Salisbury – piano on "Frozen", "All I Need" and "Forgiven", choir and orchestra arrangements
- Siard de Jong – fiddle on "Hand of Sorrow" and "Forgiven"
- The City of Prague Philharmonic Orchestra conducted by Richard Hein

=== Production ===
- Daniel Gibson – producer, arrangements on "All I Need"
- Stefan Helleblad – co-producer, engineer
- Niels Hahn – engineer, additional editing
- Stefan Glaumann – mixing
- Patrick Mühren – mixing
- Franck van der Heijden – orchestral arrangements
- Geert Keysers – orchestral arrangements

== Charts ==
=== Weekly charts ===
Chart (2007–08)	Peak Position
Australian Albums (ARIA)	88
Austrian Albums (Ö3 Austria)	12
Belgian Albums (Ultratop Flanders)	2
Belgian Albums (Ultratop Wallonia)	13
Czech Albums (ČNS IFPI)	41
Danish Albums (Hitlisten)	32
Dutch Albums (Album Top 100)	1
Finnish Albums (Suomen virallinen lista)	2
French Albums (SNEP)	26
German Albums (Offizielle Top 100)	5
Irish Albums (IRMA)	80
Japanese Albums (Oricon)	20
Mexican Albums (Top 100 Mexico)	68
Norwegian Albums (VG-lista)	24
Portuguese Albums (AFP)	5
Scottish Albums (Official Charts)	41
Spanish Albums (Promusicae)	23
Swedish Albums (Sverigetopplistan)	4
Swiss Albums (Schweizer Hitparade)	8
UK Albums (Official Charts)	38
UK Rock & Metal Albums (Official Charts)	1
US Billboard 200	106
US Top Hard Rock Albums (Billboard)	16
US Heatseekers Albums (Billboard)	1

=== Year-end charts ===
Chart (2007)	Position
Belgian Albums (Ultratop Flanders)	33
Dutch Albums (MegaCharts)	19
Finnish Albums (Suomen virallinen lista)	9
German Albums (Offizielle Top 100)	93

== Certifications and sales ==
Region	Certification	Certified units/sales
Belgium (BRMA)	Gold	25,000^{*}
Germany (BVMI)	Gold	100,000^{^}
Netherlands (NVPI)	Gold	35,000^{^}
Russia (NFPF)	Gold	5,000^{*}
United Kingdom (BPI)	Silver	60,000^{*}
^{*} Sales figures based on certification alone.^{^} Shipments figures based on certification alone.

== Release history ==
Region	Date
Netherlands	9 March 2007
Europe	12 March 2007
Finland	15 March 2007
Australia	17 March 2007
Japan	24 April 2007
United States	18 June 2007
