= The Dance (EP) =

EP by Within Temptation
- Released: 26 October 1998
- Recorded: Studio Moskou, Utrecht, Netherlands
- Genre: Gothic metal; doom metal
- Length: 28:08
- Label: DSFA
- Producer: Oscar Holleman

Within Temptation EPs chronology
The Dance (1998)	The Howling (2007)

The Dance is the first EP by the Dutch symphonic metal band Within Temptation. It was released after the single "Restless" and the album Enter. The sound is rather gothic and melancholic, unlike the later albums, e.g. Mother Earth and The Silent Force.

== Background ==
The EP features the original songs "The Dance", "Another Day" and "The Other Half (of Me)". It also included a remix of the single "Restless" and a joint remix of the songs "Candles" and "Pearls of Light". The original versions of these songs appeared on the band's previous album Enter.

It, along with Enter, was re-released in the US on September 18, 2007 by the label Season of Mist. After the great reception of later albums and the Hydra World Tour, Nuclear Blast decided to release together a re-issue of both Enter and The Dance on 10 November 2014, in order to give the new listeners access to the band's early material.

On October 19, 2018, celebrating the 20 years of band, they released a limited edition vinyl of Enter and The Dance. Copies sold out during presale. Although the EP never entered the main charts, its vinyl release entered the Dutch Vinyl Charts at number 11, twenty years after the official release.

All three songs from The Dance premiered live in 1997, with "The Dance" and "The Other Half (of Me)" being performed often, and "Another Day" on select dates. "The Dance" and "The Other Half (of Me)" were played until 2002. After that, "The Dance" was only played a few times in 2005, and "The Other Half (of Me)" was played at select shows between 2005 and 2007. "The Other Half (of Me)" was last played in 2008, for the Black Symphony show in Rotterdam.

== Track listing ==
No.	Title	Length
1.	"The Dance"	5:02
2.	"Another Day"	5:44
3.	"The Other Half (of Me)"	4:49
4.	"Remix Restless"	3:31
5.	"Remix Candles & Pearls of Light"	9:02
