= Forgiven (Within Temptation song) =

Single by Within Temptation

from the album The Heart of Everything
- Released: 12 September 2008
- Length: 4:54 (album version); 4:02 (single version)
- Label: GUN; Sony BMG
- Songwriter(s): Sharon den Adel; Robert Westerholt; Martijn Spierenburg

Within Temptation singles chronology
"All I Need" (2007)	"Forgiven" (2008)	"Utopia" (2009)

Music video
- "Forgiven" on YouTube

"Forgiven" is the fifth single from the Dutch symphonic metal band Within Temptation's fourth album The Heart of Everything. It was released to promote their upcoming DVD, Black Symphony as well as being a single from the album. The song itself is a piano-driven ballad with orchestral elements.

== Music video ==
The video for "Forgiven" is similar to that of "Jillian (I'd Give My Heart)," which is made up of footage of The Silent Force Tour. "Forgiven" features highlights of Black Symphony, which is based on the fact that "Forgiven" is a promotional single for the concert DVD. As there is a radio edit of the song, the music video portrays only the edit rather than the full-length version.

== Formats and track listings ==
These are the formats and track listings of major single releases of "Forgiven".

- 5-track digipack single
1. "Forgiven" (single version)
2. "Forgiven" (album version)
3. "The Howling" (Live at Beursgebouw Eindhoven 23-11-2007)
4. "Hand of Sorrow" (Live at Beursgebouw Eindhoven 23-11-2007)
5. "The Heart of Everything" (Live at Beursgebouw Eindhoven 23-11-2007)

A single containing only the first two tracks was planned, but eventually not released.

== Charts ==
Chart (2008)	Peak position
Germany (GfK)	87
Netherlands (Single Top 100)	9
