= The Silent Force =

Studio album by Within Temptation
- Released: 11 November 2004; 29 August 2005 (UK)
- Recorded: 10 May–29 August 2004
- Studios: Wisseloord Studios, Hilversum; Sound Park Studios, Schiedam, Netherlands; ICP Studios, Brussels, Belgium; Studio #5 and Documentary Studio, Moscow, Russia
- Genre: Symphonic metal
- Length: 46:24
- Labels: GUN (Europe); Roadrunner (rest of the world)
- Producers: Daniel Gibson; Stefan Helleblad

Within Temptation chronology
Mother Earth (2000)	The Silent Force (2004)	The Heart of Everything (2007)

Singles from The Silent Force
- 1. "Stand My Ground" Released: 17 November 2004; 2. "Memories" Released: 31 January 2005; 3. "Angels" Released: 13 June 2005

The Silent Force is the third studio album by Dutch symphonic metal band Within Temptation, released on 15 November 2004, by GUN Records. On 5 August 2008, The Silent Force along with Mother Earth were released in the United States by Roadrunner Records. This album is the first to feature Ruud Jolie on lead guitar, as well as Martijn Spierenburg on keyboards, after Martijn Westerholt had to leave the band due to illness. It is also the first to feature Daniel Gibson as their producer. The album deepened the band symphonic approach, this time featuring more atmospheric songs that resemble the predominant fantasistic lyrics, inspired both by literature and the band members personal lives.

The album spawned three singles that helped increasing the band's popularity in Europe, all of them achieving commercial success in their homeland and several other European countries. The first single, "Stand My Ground", was released in November 2004 and reached the fourth position on the Dutch Top 40. The second single, "Memories", was released on 31 January 2005. The third and final single, "Angels", was released on 13 June 2005. In order to promote the album, the band commenced their The Silent Force Tour in July 2004, playing throughout Europe and also having one concert in Dubai.

The album was met with generally favorable reviews and commercial success, increasing the band's popularity outside the Netherlands. Metal Hammer considered the album important both for Within Temptation's career and the development of the symphonic metal genre as a whole, a position shared by AllMusic. Only one week after its release, the album reached gold status in the Netherlands, Belgium, and Finland, later also achieving platinum status in Germany and double platinum in their homecountry.

== Production and recording ==
The times preceding the composition and the release of The Silent Force were eventful for the band. After some line-up changes and the commercial and critical success of Mother Earth, released at the end of 2000, the band had been feeling pressured and vulnerable, as playing music was considered mainly a hobby for the members up to then. In addition to that, they had also switched labels, from Dutch independent DSFA Records to German GUN Records, which could promote them on a greater scale. This transition was met with contractual turmoil, as the band was still inexperient and their lawyers were not specialized in working inside the music industry.

Plans for the band's third album came to fruition in 2004, and the band entered the studio in the summer that year. Writing took four to five months and recording took eight weeks. The band considered it a dark and tense time, as they were daily shutting themselves in an all-closed studio from 9am to 11pm and having their meals there. According to lead vocalist Sharon den Adel, the darkness of the studio itself contributed to enhance the gloomy feeling that dominated the band at the time.

Now signed to a bigger label, the budget for the recording sessions was improved. Due to that, the band were able to deepen the symphonic inclinations they already had and record with a full orchestra instead of using computerised orchestral sounds. It was, however, a challenging process, as the album was being recorded in the outskirts of Rotterdam, in the Netherlands, and the orchestra was situated in Moscow, Russia. The process of sending and receiving musical files was slow and laborious, due to the great size of the files and the low internet speed at that time. In spite of considering it stressful, den Adel commented that it all worked out really well in the end, and that the band grow a lot as musicians from that experience. It was the band's first album to be produced by Daniel Gibson.

=== Lyrics and inspiration ===
Lyrically, the album took inspiration in fantasy, literature, and the band members personal lives. According to den Adel, the title of the album refers to the forces that sometimes lead people to do certain things. In an interview on Buzznet, she discussed the title of the album:

"The title of our latest album 'The Silent Force' is actually taken from the title of a book from the beginning of the 19th century from a Dutch writer (who lived in Indonesia when he was young) called Louis Couperus. All the songs on this album are in some way related to that book (or at least the title)."

In an interview with Metal Hammer, den Adel commented that the depressing times the band members were undergoing during the writing and recording process reflected on the dark tone in the lyrics of the album. The political turmoil that the Netherlands were facing after the Assassination of Pim Fortuyn also impacted the band. Despite not agreeing with Fortuyn political views, the members were fearing for their future and also the future of their country. This topic was addressed on the song "Stand My Ground". "Angels" is a song about betrayal. It deals with the fact that people one trusts often show themselves untrustworthy. Although the song is written through metaphors, as the band usually do, it was inspired by the record label disputes the band had with their previous label. The song starts with "a fragile falsetto from Sharon" and later builds "into an emotional, symphonic anthem". The song "Aquarius" addresses den Adel's relation of love and fear with the ocean, a fear she developed after watching Jaws as a child.

== Release and promotion ==
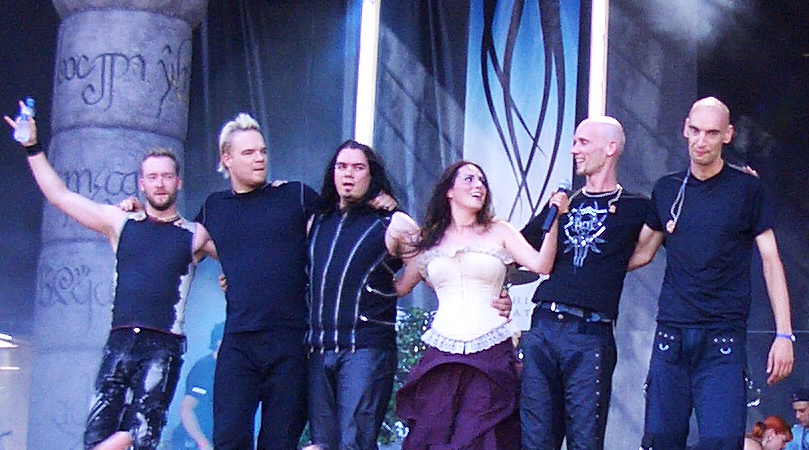
The band was present at several big European festivals.

In support of the release, the band embarked on a large international tour which spanned from 2004 to 2006, with dates across Europe, including their first festival appearance in the United Kingdom, headlining Bloodstock Open Air, and a one-off show in Dubai. "Stand My Ground" and "Memories", the first singles from the new album, continued the band's run of chart success in the Netherlands, culminating in a second Edison Award. The third single was "Angels". "Stand My Ground" was later to be promoted on the trailer for the film Blood and Chocolate. The band also provided some of the sound track to the videogame Knights of the Temple: Infernal Crusade, released in March 2005. As of 2005, the album had already sold more than 400.000 copies only in Europe.

In January 2006, Within Temptation won the Dutch Pop Prize (best Dutch pop contribution) and Dutch Export Prize (best-selling Dutch artist outside the Netherlands); the latter one given to them for the third time in a row. The band also reported that they would start playing at festivals starting in April, in addition to going on an international tour at the end of the year. On 5 August 2008, The Silent Force was released in the US for the first time through Roadrunner Records.

The following music videos were released to promote the album and the tour:

1. "Stand My Ground"
2. "Angels"
3. "Memories"
4. "Jillian (I'd Give My Heart)" (Promo video for the DVD The Silent Force Tour)

On 5 April 2019, "The Silent Force" was released on vinyl for the first time from Music On Vinyl. A limited edition of 5000 copies on clear vinyl were pressed. Inner Sleeve folded as poster with credits and lyrics.

== Reception ==
Professional ratings
Review scores
Source	Rating
AllMusic	3.5/5 stars
Blabbermouth.net	9/10
Drowned in Sound	2.5/5 stars
laut.de	4/5 stars
Metal Hammer (GER)	6/7
Metal Storm	7.5/10
Rock Hard	7/10

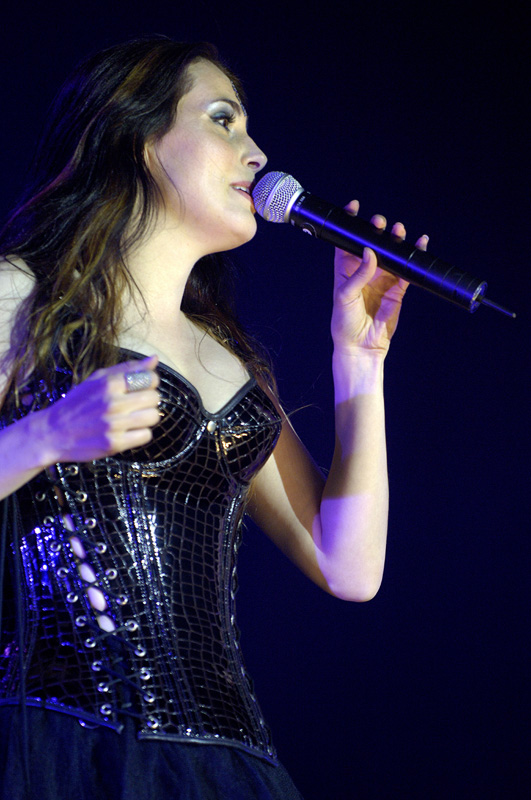
Lead vocalist Sharon den Adel during a concert of The Silent Force Tour.

The album earned generally positive reviews from critics. Critic Martin White from Blabbermouth.net gave the album a score of 9 out of 10 stars, stating that "amazingly enough, the thick instrumentation and Sharon's angelic delivery are never at odds with each other — a rare feat when it comes to music as complex and involved as Within Temptation's is." Although, the listeners rating from Blabbermouth earned a score of merely 6.5 stars out of 10.

The webzine Lords of Metal was very positive and gave the album 94 out of 100, stating that the album is "one of the most outstanding cd’s of the year". The website also compared the album with the two previous albums Mother Earth and Enter alleging that "it lacks the variety of Enter or the finesse of Mother Earth – but it remains one of the best albums recorded on Dutch soil in the last ten years."

A review coming from Metal Storm webzine was less positive, saying that it's just "a good album" and stating that the band "lost their magic in their new songs" in comparison with what the band did in their previous albums.

== Legacy ==
As of the tenth anniversary of the album release, The Silent Force received a homage article by TeamRock's Metal Hammer magazine regarding its influence both on Within Temptation's career, the heavy metal genre and symphonic metal subgenre itself. In July 2016, Metal Hammer also released a special issue edition claiming the 100 Greatest Albums of the 21st Century in which The Silent Force was awarded the 33rd place, over its influence and commercial success. On regarding the ten essential symphonic metal releases, the magazine also found a place for the album, characterizing it as an "uplifting symphonic-based style that was rendered all the more saleable by the irresistible voice and presence of Sharon den Adel." In 2021, the magazine ranked it as the 5th best symphonic metal album of all time.

== Track listing ==
=== Standard Edition ===
No.	Title	Lyrics	Music	Length
1.	"Intro"		Martijn Spierenburg	1:58
2.	"See Who I Am"	Sharon den Adel; Robert Westerholt	Spierenburg	4:52
3.	"Jillian (I'd Give My Heart)"	den Adel; Westerholt	Spierenburg	4:47
4.	"Stand My Ground"	den Adel; Westerholt	Daniel Gibson; Han'some	4:26
5.	"Pale"	den Adel; Westerholt	Westerholt	4:28
6.	"Forsaken"	den Adel; Westerholt	den Adel; Westerholt	4:54
7.	"Angels"	den Adel; Westerholt	den Adel; Spierenburg	4:00
8.	"Memories"	den Adel; Westerholt	den Adel; Spierenburg	3:51
9.	"Aquarius"	den Adel; Westerholt	Gibson; Han'some	4:47
10.	"It's the Fear"	den Adel	Westerholt	4:07
11.	"Somewhere"	den Adel; Westerholt	den Adel	4:14
Total length:				46:24

=== Bonus tracks ===
Special Edition release
No.	Title	Lyrics	Music	Length
12.	"A Dangerous Mind"	den Adel; Westerholt	Gibson; Han'some	4:17
13.	"The Swan Song"	den Adel; Westerholt	Gibson; Spierenburg	3:58
Total length:				54:39

Netherlands/Australia/Japan release
No.	Title	Lyrics	Music	Length
12.	"Destroyed" (Demo version)	den Adel	Westerholt	4:52
13.	"Jane Doe"	den Adel; Westerholt	Westerholt; Guus Eikens	4:30
Total length:				55:46

US release
No.	Title	Lyrics	Music	Length
12.	"Destroyed" (Demo version)			4:52
13.	"Jane Doe"			4:30
14.	"Say My Name"	den Adel; Westerholt	Spierenburg	4:04
15.	"The Promise" (Live in Tilburg)			8:00
16.	"Stand My Ground" (Acoustic)			3:43
17.	"Angels" (Live in Tilburg)			4:05
Total length:				75:38

=== Limited Edition versions videos ===
No.	Title	Length
1.	"Stand My Ground"
2.	"Angels"
3.	"Photo gallery"
4.	"The Making of Stand My Ground"
5.	"Screen saver"

=== Instrumental Edition (available at the iTunes Store and on Spotify) ===
No.	Title	Music	Length
1.	"Intro"	Spierenburg	1:57
2.	"See Who I Am" (instrumental)	Spierenburg	4:51
3.	"Jillian (I'd Give My Heart)" (instrumental)	Spierenburg	4:46
4.	"Stand My Ground" (instrumental)	Daniel Gibson; Han'some	4:28
5.	"Pale" (instrumental)	Westerholt	4:28
6.	"Forsaken" (instrumental)	den Adel; Westerholt	4:53
7.	"Angels" (instrumental)	den Adel; Spierenburg	4:00
8.	"Memories" (instrumental)	den Adel; Spierenburg	3:51
9.	"Aquarius" (instrumental)	Gibson; Han'some	4:46
10.	"It's the Fear" (Instrumental)	Westerholt	4:06
11.	"Somewhere" (Instrumental)	den Adel	4:14
12.	"A Dangerous Mind" (Instrumental)	Gibson; Han'some	4:16
13.	"The Swan Song" (Instrumental)	Gibson; Spierenburg	3:57
14.	"Overcome" (Instrumental)	den Adel; Spierenburg; Westerholt	4:04
Total length:			58:37

== Personnel ==
=== Band members ===
- Sharon den Adel - vocals
- Robert Westerholt - rhythm guitar
- Ruud Jolie - lead guitar
- Jeroen van Veen - bass
- Martijn Spierenburg - keyboards
- Stephen van Haestregt - drums

=== Additional musicians ===
- Isaac Muller, Siard de Jong - Celtic instruments
- Ego Works session orchestra conducted by Felix Korobov
- Choir conducted by Konstantin Majorov

=== Production ===
- Daniel Gibson - producer
- Stefan Helleblad - additional production, engineer
- Stefan Glaumann, Håkan Fredriksson, Ola Sonmark - mixing
- Bjorn Engelmann - mastering
- Ego Works - production and recording of the orchestra

== Charts ==
=== Weekly charts ===
Chart (2004–05)	Peak position
Austrian Albums (Ö3 Austria)	12
Belgian Albums (Ultratop Flanders)	4
Belgian Albums (Ultratop Wallonia)	53
Dutch Albums (Album Top 100)	1
Finnish Albums (Suomen virallinen lista)	3
French Albums (SNEP)	34
German Albums (Offizielle Top 100)	4
Norwegian Albums (VG-lista)	30
Portuguese Albums (AFP)	17
Spanish Albums (Promusicae)	26
Swedish Albums (Sverigetopplistan)	28
Swiss Albums (Schweizer Hitparade)	22
UK Albums (Official Charts)	90
UK Rock & Metal Albums (Official Charts)	8

=== Year-end charts ===
Chart (2004)	Position
Dutch Albums (MegaCharts)	49
Belgian Albums (Ultratop Flanders)	48
Chart (2005)	Position
Dutch Albums (MegaCharts)	28
Finnish Albums (Suomen virallinen lista)	19
German Albums (Offizielle Top 100)	76

== Certifications and sales ==
Region	Certification	Certified units/sales
Belgium (BRMA)	Gold	25,000^{*}
Finland (Musiikkituottajat)	Gold	18,824
Germany (BVMI)	Platinum	200,000^{‡}
Netherlands (NVPI)	2× Platinum	160,000^{^}
Portugal (AFP)	Gold	20,000^{^}
United Kingdom (BPI)	Silver	60,000^{‡}
^{*} Sales figures based on certification alone.^{^} Shipments figures based on certification alone.^{‡} Sales+streaming figures based on certification alone.
