= Jillian (I'd Give My Heart) =

Promotional single by Within Temptation

from the album The Silent Force
- Released: 2005
- Genre: Symphonic metal; gothic metal
- Length: 4:47 (album version)
- Songwriters: Sharon den Adel; Robert Westerholt; Martijn Spierenburg
- Producer: Daniel Gibson

Music video
- "Jillian (I'd Give My Heart)" on YouTube

"Jillian (I'd Give My Heart)" is a song written by Sharon den Adel, Robert Westerholt and Martijn Spierenburg for the album The Silent Force (2004). It was used to promote Within Temptation's live DVD The Silent Force Tour (2005).

== Music video ==
The video for this single contains footage of Within Temptation's The Silent Force Tour DVD. Most of it is from their performance at Java Island, Amsterdam, but it also contains backstage footage from the Silent Force Tour. This song was originally written for Jillian Marie.

== Formats and track listings ==
"Jillian (I'd Give My Heart)" was not officially released on a single. These are the formats and track listings of the promo release of "Jillian (I'd Give My Heart)".

Promo single

1. "Jillian (I'd Give My Heart)" (radio edit) – 3:55
2. "Jillian (I'd Give My Heart)" (live version) – 4:58

== Notes ==
Besides appearances on The Silent Force and The Silent Force Tour, a live version of "Jillian (I'd Give My Heart)" is the second track of Within Temptation's Black Symphony release: It is the first song of the concert in Ahoy, Rotterdam played by both Within Temptation and the Metropole Orchestra. For some other concerts from The Heart of Everything Tour, it was the opening track, merged with The Silent Force Intro. Moreover, the song is among the most frequently played live songs by the band since the release of The Silent Force. It was also featured in a trailer for the Showtime original series The Borgias.

The "Jillian (I'd Give My Heart)" song is about the Deverry Cycle fantasy novel series by Katharine Kerr set in the fictional land of Deverry.
