= Frozen (Within Temptation song) =

Single by Within Temptation

from the album The Heart of Everything
- B-side: "Sounds of Freedom"
- Released: 11 June 2007 (Europe)
- Genre: Symphonic rock
- Length: 4:28 (album version); 3:58 (single version)
- Label: Roadrunner
- Songwriter(s): Sharon den Adel; Robert Westerholt

Within Temptation singles chronology
"The Howling" (2007)	"Frozen" (2007)	"All I Need" (2007)

"Frozen" is a power ballad by Dutch symphonic metal band Within Temptation. The single was released in Europe on 11 June 2007 as the third release from the album The Heart of Everything (2007). The song and the video both deal with the issue of domestic and child abuse. The band donated the income they receive from Sony BMG for the "Frozen" single to the Child Helpline International. In the UK, the song "The Howling" was chosen for the second single, available as a digital download only. The "Frozen" single contains single versions of both these songs.

== Background ==
The song deals with the subject of domestic and child abuse. On their Web site, the band explained they wanted to raise awareness about "a subject that [they] feel is not discussed in public enough." Lead vocalist Sharon den Adel stated during an interview that she got the inspiration for writing the lyrics from her new experience as a mother. The idea of making it a single and a music video came after, as the band found important to deal with a subject as that in a real and honest way. After choosing the song as a single, the band then approached the Child Helpline International as they felt the need to make something extra with the single sales while considering the subject in question.

== Music video ==
The music video's plot supports the claim that the track is about children abuse and domestic violence.

The video portrays a typical wealthy family from the Victorian era (probably around 1900 according to the fashion). There is a "head of the household" who is on the outside, respected, hardworking, wealthy man, who has a wife and a daughter named Ana. But behind the door of their manor, he becomes an unruly egomaniacal alcoholic. During their dinner, he starts to berate his wife and then, when his wife gets up from her seat, he grabs her and pulled her to their bedroom, where he casts her onto the floor and belittles her verbally.

In one moment, Ana opens the door of the bedroom and peaks in. Her parents notice her, and her father goes to close the door, as Ana runs away. Later that night, the husband enters Ana’s room while the mother wails hysterically as it is implied her husband rapes Ana. In retaliation for what he has done to both Ana and herself, the wife decides to kill him with poison slipped into his morning coffee. As a result, the wife is put in jail, leaving the child an orphan. At the beginning and in the final moments of the video, the mother is shown writing a letter to her daughter, where she apologizes and explains to Ana why she did what she did.

The video, directed by Oliver Sommer, also features the band playing the song.

== Track listing ==
=== Standard edition ===
1. "Frozen" (single version)
2. "The Howling" (single version)

=== Maxi edition ===
1. "Frozen" (single version)
2. "The Howling" (single version)
3. "Sounds of Freedom"
4. "What Have You Done" (live acoustic)
5. "The Cross" (live acoustic)
6. "Frozen" (video)
7. "The Howling" (video)

== Charts ==
Chart (2007)	Peak position
France (SNEP)	78
Germany (GfK)	64
Netherlands (Dutch Top 40)	28
Netherlands (Mega Top 50)	7
Netherlands (Single Top 100)	11
