= All I Need (Within Temptation song) =

Single by Within Temptation

from the album The Heart of Everything
- B-side: "The Last Time"; "Frozen"; "Our Solemn Hour"; "Hand of Sorrow"
- Released: 12 November 2007
- Genre: Symphonic metal; gothic rock
- Length: 4:52 (album version); 4:03 (single version)
- Label: Roadrunner
- Songwriters: Sharon den Adel; Robert Westerholt

Within Temptation singles chronology
"The Howling" (2007)	"All I Need" (2007)	"Forgiven" (2008)

Music video
- "All I Need" on YouTube

"All I Need" is a power ballad written by Sharon den Adel and Robert Westerholt for Within Temptation's fourth studio album The Heart of Everything (2007).

== Lyrics ==
In an interview, Within Temptation vocalist Sharon den Adel discussed "All I Need":

I think lyric-wise this song is something that a lot of people can relate to. It's about the fact that [everybody], you know, everybody gets this point in life... And that is what the song is about, that you're trying to hold on to the things that are important, that you try to find something that you can believe in and which is worth living, if it's family or the love of your life or (laugh) things that make your life worth [living]. And this person in the song is really disappointed [with a lot of things], because a lot of people are fake or things don't turn out the way she had hoped they would do. And this is what the song is about and I think it's something that a lot of people can relate to.

== Music video ==
The video for this single was shot on 30 September in Berlin. It was released online on 19 October 2007. The video consists of a dream world in the mind of Sharon's character. The band is shown tied to walls of their cells, along with various surrealistic scenes. In the end of the video Sharon is shown in a hospital bed with images from the dream sequence flickering on a screen connected to her mind via wires.

In an interview, den Adel discussed some elements of the video:

The story is very short and very simple actually. It's a dream. A lot of times she sees a lot of schizophrenic things, you know, happening in her mind...

Lea: It's you in a hospital-bed there...

Sharon: Yeah, and they are monitoring my dreams, so they are analysing what I'm dreaming. And that's basically the video and it just suited best with the lyrics, because it's very difficult to express things which are very symbolic, which you can't really show in images like "hope". How do you express "hope", you know? Or "believe in something" or "keeping something real" or "people who are fake". You can image that very well in a way of a dream. That's why we did it in that way.

The video contains many elements and imagery from the 2000 movie The Cell.

== Usage in other media ==
The song was first featured on the episode "Miss Mystic Falls", from American television series The Vampire Diaries. The song was covered by German gregorian chant group Gregorian for their thirteenth album, Dark Side of the Chant. During the fourth season of Belgian television show Liefde voor muziek, in which each week guest artists cover a song from another selected artist, the song was covered by Helmut Lotti for den Adel's homage day and later selected for appearing on the official album release from the season.

== Formats and track listings ==
These are the formats and track listings of major single releases of "All I Need".

- 5-track digipack single
1. "All I Need" (single version)
2. "All I Need" (album version)
3. "The Last Time" (demo version)
4. "Frozen" (demo version)
5. "Our Solemn Hour" (demo version)
- 2-track single
1. "All I Need" (single version)
2. "All I Need" (album version)
- iTunes download single
1. "All I Need" (single version)
2. "All I Need" (album version)
3. "Hand Of Sorrow" (demo version)
4. "Ice Queen" (acoustic live)

== Charts ==
=== Weekly charts ===
Chart (2008–2010)	Peak position
Germany (GfK)	78
Netherlands (Dutch Top 40)	15
Netherlands (Single Top 100)	13
UK Rock & Metal (OCC)	37

=== Year-end charts ===
Chart (2008)	Position
Netherlands (Dutch Top 40)	266
