= What Have You Done =

Single by Within Temptation featuring Keith Caputo

from the album The Heart of Everything
- B-side: "Blue Eyes"
- Released: 14 February 2007 (Europe)
- Genre: Symphonic metal; alternative metal; hard rock; nu metal
- Length: 5:13 (album version); 3:59 (radio edit with intro); 3:24 (US edit and iTunes version)
- Label: Roadrunner
- Songwriters: Sharon den Adel; Robert Westerholt; Daniel Gibson
- Producer: Daniel Gibson

Within Temptation singles chronology
"Angels" (2005)	"What Have You Done" (2007)	"Frozen" (2007)

"What Have You Done" is the first single from Dutch symphonic metal band Within Temptation's fourth studio album The Heart of Everything (2007). The song features guest vocals from Life of Agony's lead singer Keith Caputo and it was released as the album's first single in early 2007 (see 2007 in music). It became their first charting single in Canada and in the United States. A new edit and version of the song was released in the US through iTunes on 26 June 2007.

== Music video ==
There are two music videos for "What Have You Done":

In the first video, Sharon den Adel is a spy. Keith Caputo is an FBI agent who has been assigned the task of capturing den Adel. They were formerly lovers, but an unconfirmed issue rose between them, causing them to separate. Caputo searches the world for Adel before finally locating her singing with the band in a bar in Thailand; however, she is thrown out by the bouncer and is refused re-entry. Den Adel stands behind the bouncer, grinning suspiciously. She makes her way through a jungle in the next scene, with Caputo following her. After reaching a cliff with no escape, den Adel faces Caputo and whispers "I love you." She turns and jumps off the cliff. Although Caputo is under the impression that den Adel did not survive the fall, at the end she is lying on rocks, smiling.

In the second, definite video, Sharon den Adel seems to be leaving an abusive partner. Her partner is left behind in a house, and trashes it, smashing mirrors and vases. This video has a more sinister and dark atmosphere present. This video also contains footage of Caputo, although not together with any member of Within Temptation.

The first video was quickly replaced by this version. The band stated that they wanted to replace the video because the "band shots were too dark and the 'jungle' part didn't look very convincing." Only the second version was released on DVD with the special edition of The Heart of Everything and with Black Symphony. A new edit of this version was also used to promote the single in the United States.

== Live versions ==
"What Have You Done" (feat. Keith Caputo) was also released as a live version on the band's Black Symphony release. Roadrunner Records USA/Australia used this version to promote Black Symphony before its release. This recording with the Metropole Orchestra in Ahoy, Rotterdam, 2008 was one of the two only live performances of the song in which Keith Caputo sang along live (the other one being at the Dauwpop festival in 2007). In other performances, the band plays a video of Keith Caputo singing on screen and encourages the audience to sing the parts.

In acoustic performances of this song, as found on the "Frozen" maxi-single and the special edition of The Heart of Everything, Caputo's vocals are absent and Sharon den Adel sings Caputo's parts as well. On the live album An Acoustic Night at the Theatre, "What Have You Done" appears as a duet with Caputo once again, although Caputo's vocals were not recorded live.

== In other media ==
This song is available as a downloadable song in the games Guitar Hero World Tour, Guitar Hero 5, and Guitar Hero: Warriors of Rock. In 2008, Dutch TV program Koefnoen made a parody on this song titled "What Am I Doing Here".

== Formats and track listings ==
These are the formats and track listings of major single releases of "What Have You Done".

- European CD promotional single
1. "What Have You Done" (European radio version) a.k.a. (single version) (3:59)
2. "What Have You Done" (rock mix) (3:52)
- Canadian and European CD single
1. "What Have You Done" (European radio version) a.k.a. (single version) (3:59)
2. "What Have You Done" (album version) (5:16)
- European maxi CD single
1. "What Have You Done" (European radio version) a.k.a. (single version) (3:59)
2. "What Have You Done" (album version) (5:16)
3. "Blue Eyes" (non-album track) (5:26)
4. "Aquarius" (Live at Java-eiland, Amsterdam) (4:46)
5. "Caged" (Live at Java-eiland, Amsterdam) (5:44)
- US promotional single number one
1. "What Have You Done" (US edit) (3:24)
- US promotional single number two
1. "What Have You Done" (US pop mix) (4:00)
- US iTunes EP (digital exclusive)
1. "What Have You Done" (US edit) (3:24)
2. "What Have You Done" (album version) (5:16)
3. "What Have You Done" (acoustic live) (4:33)
4. "What Have You Done" (video)

== Charts ==
=== Weekly charts ===
Chart (2007)	Peak position
Austria (Ö3 Austria Top 40)	49
Belgium (Ultratop 50 Flanders)	49
Finland (Suomen virallinen lista)	4
Germany (GfK)	32
Netherlands (Dutch Top 40)	7
Netherlands (Mega Top 50)	2
Netherlands (Single Top 100)	7
Portuguese Singles Chart	3
Sweden (Sverigetopplistan)	40
Switzerland (Schweizer Hitparade)	36
US Mainstream Rock Tracks (Billboard)	33

=== Year-end charts ===
Chart (2007)	Position
Finland (Suomen virallinen lista)	10
Netherlands (Dutch Top 40)	65
Netherlands (Single Top 100)	83
