= Stand My Ground =

Single by Within Temptation

from the album The Silent Force
- B-side: "Overcome"; "Towards the End"; "It's the Fear"; "Forsaken"; "The Swan Song"
- Released: 17 November 2004
- Recorded: 2004
- Genre: Symphonic metal; gothic metal; neoclassical metal
- Length: 4:26 (album version); 3:58 (single version)
- Label: Roadrunner
- Songwriters: Robert Westerholt; Sharon den Adel; Martijn Spierenburg; Daniel Gibson
- Producer: Daniel Gibson

Within Temptation singles chronology
"Running Up that Hill" (2003)	"Stand My Ground" (2004)	"Memories" (2005)

Music video
- "Stand My Ground" on YouTube

"Stand My Ground" is the first single from Dutch symphonic metal band Within Temptation's album The Silent Force. The song is also included on the US edition of the band's 2007 album The Heart of Everything. It became a top 10 hit in three countries (the Netherlands, Belgium and Finland) and became a top 40 hit in four other countries. It was also used in the trailer for the film Blood & Chocolate.

Along with their earlier singles "Ice Queen" and "Mother Earth", "Stand My Ground" has become one of the band's signature songs and is performed on their set of almost every concert since its release.

== Track listing ==
CD-single
No.	Title	Length
1.	"Stand My Ground (radio edit)"	3:59
2.	"Overcome (non-album-track)"	4:04

EP single
No.	Title	Length
1.	"Stand My Ground (radio edit)"	3:59
2.	"Overcome (non-album-track)"	4:04
3.	"It's the Fear (demo version)"	4:09
4.	"Stand My Ground (album version)"	4:28

CD multi single
No.	Title	Length
1.	"Stand My Ground (radio edit)"	3:59
2.	"Overcome (non-album-track)"	4:04
3.	"It's the Fear (demo version)"	4:09
4.	"Towards the End"	3:28
5.	"The Swan Song (instrumental and orchestral version)"	3:41

DVD single
No.	Title	Length
1.	"Stand My Ground (single version)"	3:58
2.	"Overcome (non-album-track)"	4:04
3.	"It's the Fear (demo version)"	4:08
4.	"Forsaken"	4:53
5.	"Towards the End"	3:27
6.	"Stand My Ground (video)"
7.	"Stand My Ground (making of the video)"
8.	"Studio Impressions (video)"
9.	"On Tour (video)"
10.	"Photo Gallery"

== Video ==
The video was shot in Berlin and was released two weeks before the single release. The storyboard, 3D effects and illustrations shown were created by artist Marcel de Jong. The video became a superclip at the Dutch music station TMF, which means it was played every hour for a week.

== Reception ==
The song was successful in the Netherlands reaching the number four spot but was also the most successful song after "Ice Queen" in Europe. It went top ten in also Belgium and Finland and became a number 13 hit in Germany. Although there was no sign of the song in the official Spanish chart, it topped the Spanish Airplay Chart and Los 40 Principales.

== Charts ==
=== Weekly charts ===
Chart (2004–2005)	Peak position
Austria (Ö3 Austria Top 40)	25
Belgium (Ultratop 50 Flanders)	9
Belgium (Ultratip Bubbling Under Wallonia)	5
Finland (Suomen virallinen lista)	9
Germany (GfK)	13
Netherlands (Dutch Top 40)	4
Netherlands (Mega Top 50)	5
Netherlands (Single Top 100)	5
Norway (VG-lista)	20
Spain (Los 40 Principales)	1
Sweden (Sverigetopplistan)	21
Switzerland (Schweizer Hitparade)	67

=== Year-end charts ===
Chart (2004)	Position
Belgium (Ultratop Flanders)	89
Netherlands (Dutch Top 40)	79

== Chart performance ==
Dutch Top 40
Week	01	02	03	04	05	06	07	08	09
Position	27	10	5	4	8	13	20	32	32
