= Orphanage (band) =

Dutch metal band

- Origin: Utrecht, Netherlands
- Genres: Gothic metal, melodic death metal
- Years active: 1993–2005
- Labels: Nuclear Blast; DSFA
- Past members: Jason Köhnen Stefan Ruiters Martine van Loon Lex Vogelaar Eric Hoogendoorn Jules Vleugels; Erwin Polderman; Lasse Dellbrügge; George Oosthoek; Rosan van der Aa; Theo Holsheimer; Marcel Verdurmen; Guus Eikens; Remko van der Spek; Sureel

Orphanage were a death metal/gothic metal band from the Netherlands.

== History ==
The band was formed in 1993 and released their first demos Morph (1993) and Druid (1994). Orphanage then recorded their first full album Oblivion, and one year later released their second album, By Time Alone. In 1997, the band released the EP At the Mountains of Madness, and worked three years on the album Inside, which was released in 2000. The last album Driven was released in 2004. On 18 October 2005 the band announced that they had disbanded.

== Band members ==
Final line-up

- George Oosthoek – harsh vocals (1994–2005)
- Rosan van der Aa – clean vocals (1995–2005)
- Theo Holsheimer – guitars (2004–2005)
- Marcel Verdurmen – guitars (2004–2005)
- Guus Eikens – keyboards (1993–2000, 2004–2005), guitar (2000–2004)
- Remko van der Spek – bass (2000–2005)
- Sureel – drums (2000–2005)

Former

- Jason Köhnen – harsh vocals (1993)
- Stefan Ruiters – clean vocals (1993)
- Martine van Loon – clean vocals (1994–1995)
- Lex Vogelaar – guitars (1993–2000)
- Lasse Dellbrügge – keyboards (2000–2004)
- Eric Hoogendoorn – bass (1993–2000)
- Stephen van Haestregt – drums (1993–1994)
- Jules Vleugels – drums (1995)
- Erwin Polderman – drums (1995–2000)

== Discography ==
Studio albums

- Oblivion (1995)
- By Time Alone (1996)
- Inside (2000)
- Driven (2004)

EPs

- At the Mountains of Madness (1997)
- The Sign Tour (2003)
