= Angels (Within Temptation song) =

Single by Within Temptation

from the album The Silent Force
- B-side: "Say My Name"
- Released: 13 June 2005
- Recorded: 2004
- Genre: Symphonic metal; gothic metal
- Length: 4:02
- Label: Roadrunner
- Songwriters: Robert Westerholt; Martijn Spierenburg; Sharon den Adel
- Producer: Daniel Gibson

Within Temptation singles chronology
"Memories" (2005)	"Angels" (2005)	"What Have You Done" (2007)

Music video
- "Angels" on YouTube

"Angels" is a song by Dutch symphonic metal band Within Temptation from their third studio album, The Silent Force. It was released as the third single from the album on 13 June 2005, also accompanying a music video. The video earned the band a Golden God Award in the following year.

== Track listing ==
CD single (two-track)

1. "Angels" (album version) (4:02)
2. "Say My Name" (non-album track) (4:06)

CD single (three-track)

1. "Angels" (album version) (4:02)
2. "Say My Name" (non-album track) (4:06)
3. "Forsaken" (live at 013, Tilburg, the Netherlands, 21 April 2005) (4:54)

CD multi single (five-track) – BeNeLux and Germany
No.	Title	Length
1.	"Angels (album version)"	4:02
2.	"Say My Name (non-album track)"	4:06
3.	"Forsaken (live at 013, Tilburg, the Netherlands, 21 April 2005)"	4:54
4.	"The Promise (live at 013, Tilburg, the Netherlands, 21 April 2005)"	7:59
5.	"Angels (live at 013, Tilburg, the Netherlands, 21 April 2005)"	4:12

CD multi single (five-track) and DVD
No.	Title	Length
1.	"Angels (album version)"	4:02
2.	"Say My Name (non-album track)"	4:06
3.	"Forsaken (live at 013, Tilburg, the Netherlands, 21 April 2005)"	4:54
4.	"The Promise (live at 013, Tilburg, the Netherlands, 21 April 2005)"	7:59
5.	"Angels (live at 013, Tilburg, the Netherlands, 21 April 2005)"	4:12
6.	"The Promise (live at 013, Tilburg and Paradiso, Amsterdam)"	8:00
7.	"Angels (live at 013, Tilburg and Paradiso, Amsterdam)"	4:09
8.	"Forsaken (live at 013, Tilburg and Paradiso, Amsterdam)"	4:54
9.	"Angels (videoclip)"
10.	"Within Temptation in Dubai"	5:45

== Music video ==
The video is shot in a desert in Spain. It tells the story of a group of vigilante angels who make it their mission to wipe out evil.

Sharon den Adel is a woman who has been seemingly abandoned on the side of the road in the middle of nowhere. She accepts a ride from a priest, who takes her back to his home. The priest is in fact a demonic serial killer, who adopts different disguises to get to his victims. All of these disguises are trustworthy people, like a doctor, a construction worker, a police officer, a clown, or a priest.

As Sharon stumbles upon a board full of newspaper clippings in the killer's home, which are about his previous victims, he seemingly overpowers her with chloroform. He takes a tied up Sharon to the middle of the desert to bury her alive. However, Sharon immediately awakens as the other angels approach (the other band members) and is revealed to also be one of the angels, who was left at the side of the road as bait for the serial killer, during which time the rest of the vigilantes appear and the killer is confronted with the spirits of his victims, who destroy him. The vigilantes then move onto their next target.

The theme to the 1979 film Phantasm was sampled.

== Charts ==
=== Weekly charts ===
Chart (2005)	Peak position
Austria (Ö3 Austria Top 40)	50
Belgium (Ultratop 50 Flanders)	41
Finland (Suomen virallinen lista)	9
Germany (GfK)	25
Netherlands (Dutch Top 40)	11
Netherlands (Mega Top 50)	15
Netherlands (Single Top 100)	8

=== Year-end charts ===
Chart (2005)	Position
Netherlands (Dutch Top 40)	85
