= Memories (Within Temptation song) =

Single by Within Temptation

from the album The Silent Force
- B-side: "Destroyed"; "Aquarius"
- Released: 31 January 2005
- Recorded: 2004
- Genre: Symphonic rock; gothic rock
- Length: 3:51 (album version); 3:28 (single version)
- Label: Roadrunner
- Songwriters: Robert Westerholt; Sharon den Adel; Martijn Spierenburg
- Producer: Daniel Gibson

Within Temptation singles chronology
"Stand My Ground" (2004)	"Memories" (2005)	"Angels" (2005)

Music video
- "Memories" on YouTube

"Memories" is a ballad-song by Dutch symphonic metal band Within Temptation from their third studio album, The Silent Force. It was released as the second single from the album on 31 January 2005 also accompanying a music video. The song was covered by American classical crossover singer Jackie Evancho for her third studio album, Awakening.

== Track listing ==
CD single

1. "Memories"
2. "Aquarius" (orchestral version)

CD multi single
No.	Title	Length
1.	"Memories (single version)"	3:28
2.	"Aquarius (orchestral version)"	4:47
3.	"A Dangerous Mind (Live at Bataclan, Paris, 2004)"	4:08

DualDisc single (CD side)
No.	Title	Length
1.	"Memories (single version)"	3:28
2.	"Destroyed (demo version)"	4:54
3.	"Aquarius (orchestral version)"	4:47
4.	"A Dangerous Mind (live at Bataclan, Paris, 2004)"	4:08
5.	"Memories (live at Bataclan, Paris, 2004)"	4:02

DualDisc single (DVD side)
No.	Title	Length
1.	"A Dangerous Mind (live at Bataclan, Paris, 2004)"	4:08
2.	"Memories (live at Bataclan, Paris, 2004)"	4:02
3.	"Backstage Paris"

== Music video ==
The band playing inside an old manor on the "Memories" music video (2005)

The Memories video tells the story of an aged Sharon den Adel who returns to her old house, which is now for sale. As she enters her old home, she is transformed into her younger self and the house is restored to how it is in her memories. In some scenes, den Adel walks around the house, haunted by memories of her old lover and in others, she is in a room with other bandmates singing. Jeroen, the band's bassist, plays a double bass in one of the scenes from the past, while Martijn, their keyboard player, plays the piano.

As she leaves the house towards the end, she becomes her aged self again, and the house falls back into its current disrepair.

== Charts ==
=== Weekly charts ===
Chart (2005)	Peak position
Austria (Ö3 Austria Top 40)	44
Belgium (Ultratop 50 Flanders)	26
Belgium (Ultratip Bubbling Under Wallonia)	8
Finland (Suomen virallinen lista)	19
Germany (GfK)	17
Netherlands (Dutch Top 40)	11
Netherlands (Single Top 100)	18
Switzerland (Schweizer Hitparade)	45

=== Year-end charts ===
Chart (2005)	Position
Netherlands (Dutch Top 40)	100
