= Martijn Spierenburg =

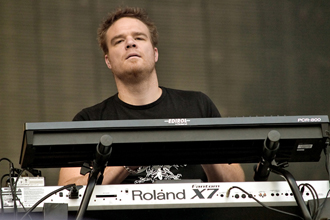
- Martijn Spierenburg on stage (2008)

Background information
- Born: Martinus Johannes Everardus Spierenburg; 30 January 1975 (age 51)
- Origin: Netherlands
- Genres: Classical, symphonic rock, pop
- Occupations: Composer, arranger, keyboardist
- Years active: 1992–present
- Formerly of: Within Temptation

Martijn Spierenburg (born 30 January 1975) is a composer and arranger. He was also the keyboard player for the Dutch symphonic metal band Within Temptation from 2001 to 2024. In 2018, it was announced that he would be the composer for the musical "Nieuw Amsterdam", which describes the role of the Dutch during the emergence of the city of New York, back in the Golden Age. This piece will be the successor to the successful Dutch piece "Soldaat van Oranje".

Spierenburg has written and arranged music for several (international) artists, TV series and games. He joined Within Temptation in 2001, shortly after the release of Within Temptation's second full-length studio album, Mother Earth. He was a member of Within Temptation until his departure in December 2024.

Spierenburg co-wrote songs for various Within Temptation albums, including "Angels", "Memories", "Jillian (I'd Give My Heart)", "Our Solemn Hour", "The Cross", "Sinéad" and "Forgiven". He uses ROLAND keyboards on stage.

Spierenburg also writes orchestral arrangements for the band, and oversees the orchestra when the band are recording albums.

== Discography ==
=== With Within Temptation ===
==== Studio albums ====
- The Silent Force (2004)
- The Heart of Everything (2007)
- The Unforgiving (2011)
- Hydra (2014)
- Resist (2018)
- Bleed Out (Within Temptation album) (2023)
