= Robert Westerholt =

Dutch guitarist

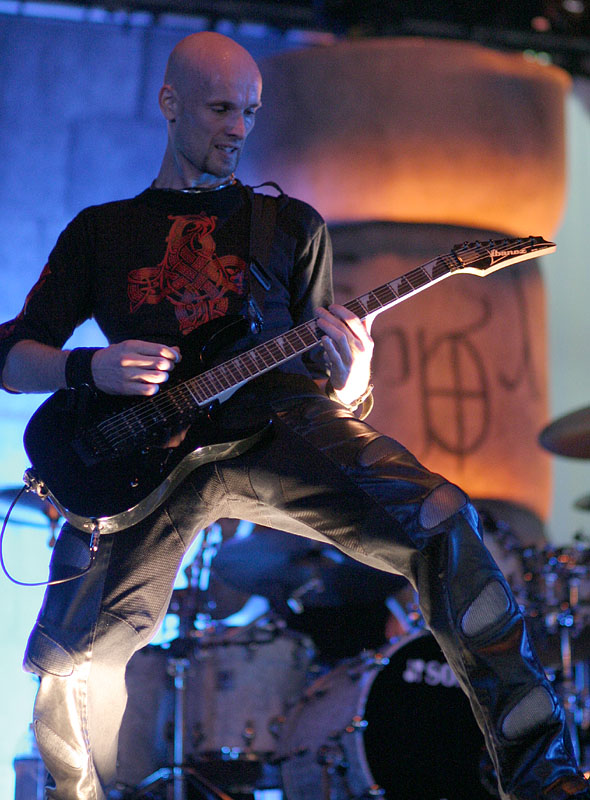
- Westerholt at Appelpop 2004

Background information
- Born: 2 January 1975 (age 51)
- Origin: Waddinxveen, South Holland, Netherlands
- Genres: Symphonic metal; alternative metal
- Occupations: Musician; songwriter
- Instruments: Guitar; vocals
- Years active: 1992–present
- Member of: Within Temptation
- Formerly of: The Circle
- Spouse: Sharon den Adel (m. 2018)

Robert Westerholt (born 2 January 1975) is a Dutch guitarist who is a founding member of the symphonic metal band Within Temptation. He writes music for the band, which is fronted by his partner and band vocalist Sharon den Adel. Westerholt used to work in human resource management before his career with Within Temptation.

== Work prior to Within Temptation ==
Westerholt was born in Waddinxveen, South Holland. In 1992, he formed the band The Circle with future Within Temptation keyboard player Martijn Spierenburg, and he began writing his own music. The Circle's first demo, entitled Symphony No. 1, was finished in December 1992. At this point, The Circle had a complete lineup, composed of Westerholt, Martijn, Jeroen van Veen (Within Temptation's bassist), Arjan Groenedijk and Ernst van der Loo, although Arjan and Ernst both left the band a while later. In a 1995 compilation album released by DSFA Records, two songs, "Broken Silence" and "Frozen" by The Circle, were featured. Soon afterward, Westerholt left The Circle, and the band was renamed as Voyage. Voyage released their only album, Embrace, in 1995, in which Sharon den Adel collaborated on the track "Frozen".

== Within Temptation ==
After leaving The Circle, Westerholt began writing more music for a new musical project with his girlfriend, Sharon den Adel. Westerholt sent demo versions of their songs 'Enter' and 'Candles' to former Voyage bandmate Jeroen van Veen, who then left Voyage to join Westerholt's project, along with Michiel Papenhove. Their first drummer was Richard Willemse, who left and was replaced with Dennis Leeflang, with whom Within Temptation recorded their first demo. He left soon afterward and was replaced with Ivar de Graaf. Westerholt recalls that "we always had a little bit of a drummer problem, leaving and coming back again...". By 1997, their lineup had been completed, with Sharon (vocals), Westerholt (guitars and vocals), Westerholt's brother Martijn (keyboards), Jeroen (bass), Michiel (guitar) and Ivar (drums). In the same year, Within Temptation were signed to DSFA Records and released their debut album, Enter.

As of 2011, Westerholt has stepped down from touring with Within Temptation in order to take care of his and Den Adel's children. He is still a recording band member, however, and will focus on songwriting and production. Stefan Helleblad, who has been working behind the scenes with the band, is his live stand-in.

== Other appearances ==
In 1998, he had a small singing part as Death (along with George Oosthoek of Orphanage) on the Ayreon rock opera "Into the Electric Castle", on which Sharon den Adel played one of the main characters.

== Personal life ==
Westerholt and Sharon den Adel became parents to Eva Luna on 7 December 2005 and Robin Aiden on 1 June 2009. The birth of their son, Logan Arwin, was announced on 31 March 2011. Westerholt and den Adel eventually married in 2018.

New title	Guitarist for Within Temptation since 1996	Incumbent
