= List of awards and nominations received by Within Temptation =

List of Within Temptation awards and nominations
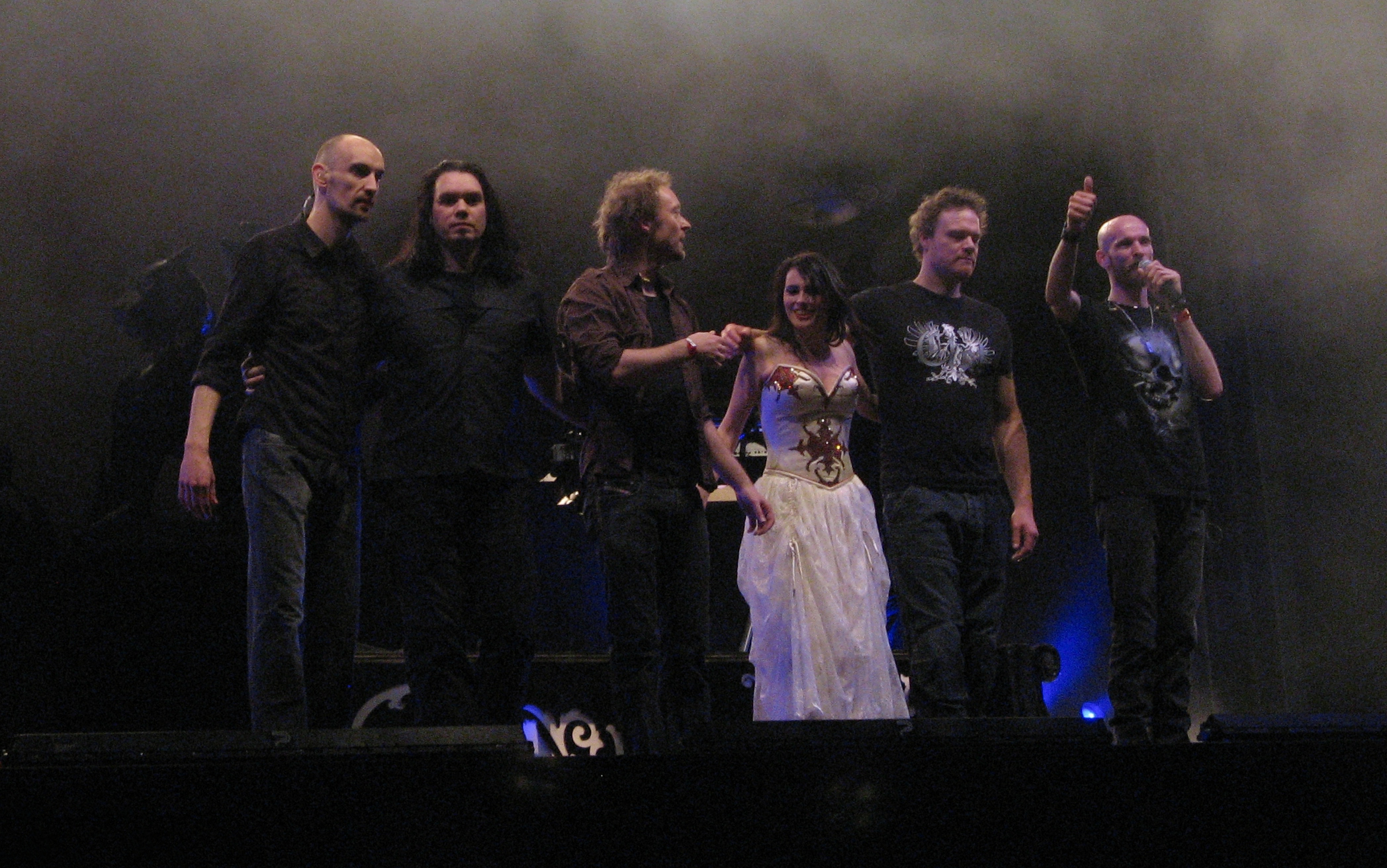
- Within Temptation at the Bevrijdingsfestival, Netherlands, 2008.
Awards and nominations
Award	Won	Nominated
3FM Award	3	6
Buma Export Award	5	5
Buma Music in Motion	1	1
Echo Awards	0	1
Edison Award	3	4
Golden Harp	2	2
IMPALA Awards	0	1
Loudwire Music Awards	4	4
MTV Europe Music Awards	1	2
Metal Hammer Golden Gods	0	2
Netherlands Film Festival	0	5
Revolver Golden Gods	1	1
Silver Harp	1	1
TMF Awards	6	6
World Music Awards	2	2
- Totals
Totals	29	44

Within Temptation is a Dutch Edison Award-winning symphonic metal band from the Netherlands formed in 1996 by vocalist Sharon den Adel and guitarist Robert Westerholt.

The band's first release, Enter, came in 1997 and made the band a prominent act in the Dutch underground scene, allowing them to play in metal festivals such as Dynamo Open Air. At the end of 2000 the band released their second album, entitled Mother Earth. The album did not reach commercial success until 2001 with the release of the album second single, "Ice Queen", which reached No. 2 on the Dutch charts. The album lead the band to both public and critic recognition earning them platinum status in the Netherlands and also two TMF Awards for "Best Rock" and "Most Promising Act". Since then, the band won the Conamus Exportprijs four years in a row. Their next albums The Silent Force and The Heart of Everything debuted at No. 1 on the Dutch charts, as the 2014 release Hydra, while also providing the band nominations in several national and international alwards such as the Edison Awards, Echo Awards, Revolver Golden Gods and MTV European Music Awards.

== Awards ==
=== 3FM Awards ===
The 3FM Awards are arranged by NPO 3FM and are decided by public vote. Within Temptation has won three awards from six nominations.

Awards
Year	Category	Work	Result
2006	Best Rock Artist	Within Temptation	Won
2007	Best Rock Artist	Within Temptation	Won
2009	Best Rock Artist	Within Temptation	Nominated
2009	Best Live Act	Within Temptation	Won
2011	Best Rock Artist	Within Temptation	Nominated
2012	Best Rock Artist	Within Temptation	Nominated

=== AIM Awards ===
The AIM Independent Music Awards are hosted by the Association of Independent Music (AIM) and were established in 2011 to recognize artists signed to independent record labels in the United Kingdom. Within Temptation has received one nomination.

Awards
Year	Category	Work	Result
2014	Independent Album of the Year	Hydra	Nominated

=== Buma Cultuur Awards ===
The Buma Cultuur is a non-profit organization that supports and promotes Dutch music. Within Temptation has received the best-selling award on five years and the Buma Music in Motion, in which award new forms of delivering music, one.

Awards
Year	Category	Work	Result
2003	Buma Export Award^{[A]}	Within Temptation	Won
2004	Buma Export Award^{[A]}	Within Temptation	Won
2005	Buma Export Award^{[A]}	Within Temptation	Won
2006	Buma Export Award^{[A]}	Within Temptation	Won
2011	Buma Music in Motion	The Unforgiving	Won
2016	Buma Export Award	Within Temptation	Won
2024	Lifetime Achievement Award	Within Temptation	Won

- A Previously known as Conamus Export Award.

=== Echo Awards ===
The ECHO Music Awards were organized in 1992 by German Phonoakademie, the cultural institute of the German Music Industry Association (BVMI) to recognize national and international successful works, and winners are determined by representatives of record companies, music publishers, artists, critics and other professionals within the German music industry. Within Temptation received one nomination.

Awards
Year	Category	Work	Result
2008	Best International Rock Group	Within Temptation	Nominated

=== Edison Awards ===
The Edison Awards are an annual Dutch music prize awarded by NVPI, being the Dutch equivalent of the Grammy Awards. Within Temptation has won three awards out of four nominations.

Awards
Year	Category	Work	Result
2003	Best Live DVD	Mother Earth Tour	Won
2005	Best National Group	Within Temptation	Won
2019	Best Video	The Reckoning	Nominated
2024	Best Rock Album	Bleed Out	Won

=== Independent Music Companies Association Awards ===
The Independent Music Companies Association Awards (or IMPALA Awards) recognizes the best European independent musical releases of the year. The winners are defined by a jury based on artistic merit alone. Within Temptation has received one nomination.

Awards
Year	Category	Work	Result
2015	European Independent Album of the Year	Hydra	Nominated

=== Loudwire Music Awards ===
The Loudwire Music Awards are annually held by the online magazine Loudwire, in which covers hard rock and heavy metal music. The nominated works are selected by the editors and the winners by public vote. Within Temptation has won two awards and lead vocalist Sharon den Adel as well.

Awards
Year	Category	Work	Result
2011	Rock Album of the Year	The Unforgiving	Won
2011	Artist of the Year	Within Temptation	Won
2011	Rock Goddess of the Year	Sharon den Adel	Won
2014	Rock Goddess of the Year	Sharon den Adel	Won

=== Metal Hammer Awards (GER) ===
The Metal Hammer Awards is an annual awards ceremony held by the German issue of Metal Hammer, a British heavy metal magazine. Within Temptation has won one award from two nominations.

Awards
Year	Category	Work	Result
2014	Best Album	Hydra	Nominated
2014	Best Live Band	Within Temptation	Won

=== Metal Hammer Golden Gods (UK) ===
The Metal Hammer Golden Gods Awards is an annual awards ceremony held by Metal Hammer, a British heavy metal magazine. Within Temptation has received two nominations.

Awards
Year	Category	Work	Result
2005	Best Breakthrough Artist	Within Temptation	Nominated
2014	Best International Band	Within Temptation	Nominated

=== MTV Europe Music Awards ===
The MTV Europe Music Awards were established in 1994 by MTV Networks Europe to celebrate the most popular music videos in Europe. Within Temptation has won one time from two nominations.

Awards
Year	Category	Work	Result
2005	MTV Europe Music Award for Best Dutch & Belgian Act	Within Temptation	Nominated
2007	MTV Europe Music Award for Best Dutch & Belgian Act	Within Temptation	Won

=== Netherlands Film Festival ===
The Netherlands Film Festival is an annual film festival held in the Dutch city of Utrecht. Within Temptation has received five nominations for their short films released alongside The Unforgiving.

Awards
Year	Category	Work	Result
2011	Best Fictie	Mother Maiden	Nominated
2011	Best Fictie	Sinéad	Nominated
2011	Best Fictie	Triplets	Nominated
2011	Best Video	Faster	Nominated
2011	Best Video	Sinéad	Nominated

=== The Rocks Awards ===
The Rocks is an annual awards ceremony held by Planet Rock, a British rock music radio station. The nominees are selected by the radio station and the winner by public vote Within Temptation has been nominated once.

Awards
Year	Category	Work	Result
2021	Best International Band	Within Temptation	Runner-up

=== Revolver Golden Gods ===
The Revolver Golden Gods Awards are an annual awards ceremony held by Revolver, an American hard rock and heavy metal magazine. Within Temptation has won one time.

Awards
Year	Category	Work	Result
2005	Best Video	Angels	Won

=== TMF Awards ===
The TMF Awards were arranged by now inoperative international television channel The Music Factory and had both Belgian and Dutch ceremonies. Within Temptation received two awards from the Belgian ceremonies and four awards from the Dutch.

Belgian Awards
Year	Category	Work	Result
2002	Best International Rock Artist	Within Temptation	Won
2007	Best International Live Act	Within Temptation	Won
Dutch Awards
Year	Category	Work	Result
2002	Most Promising Act	Within Temptation	Won
2005	Best National Rock Artist	Within Temptation	Won
2007	Best Video	What Have You Done	Won
2007	Best Live Act	Within Temptation	Won

=== World Music Awards ===
The World Music Awards was an annual international awards show founded in 1989 that honoured recording artists based on worldwide sales figures provided by the International Federation of the Phonographic Industry (IFPI).

Awards
Year	Category	Work	Result
2005	Best-Selling Dutch Artist	Within Temptation	Won
2007	Best-Selling Dutch Artist	Within Temptation	Won
