= Sanctuary (tour) =

2012 concert tour by Within Temptation

- Tour by Within Temptation
- Promotional artwork for the Sanctuary tour
- Associated album: The Unforgiving
- Start date: 2 March 2012
- End date: 15 April 2012
- Legs: 1
- No. of shows: 17

Within Temptation concert chronology
- The Unforgiving Tour (2011–2012); Sanctuary Tour (2012); The Unforgiving Tour (2012–2013)

Sanctuary Tour is a concert tour, predominantly acoustic, by the Dutch symphonic metal band Within Temptation in support of their fifth studio album, The Unforgiving, released by Roadrunner Records on 25 March 2011. This is their eight tour and the third passing over theaters.

== Background ==
On 16 December, Within Temptation announced that their 2012 acoustic Dutch theatre shows would form part of The Unforgiving Tour, featuring electric renditions of the album's songs. On the first of March 2012, the band announced that the acoustic performances will be called the Sanctuary Tour, and will have a concept. Den Adel stated in the band official website that "When selecting and listening to our songs we noticed how well they fit together and how much they have in common, both stylistically and lyrically. More and more, we also realized that by putting these songs in a certain order we were actually creating a story. As the visuals and movies we use during our shows have become a bigger and bigger part of our shows, this new story gave us the perfect opportunity to create new film material. This not only shows the story line visually, but supports the musical story as well."

=== Synopsis ===
Scotland. The Highlands, 1895.

A young boy, sick, is lying in his bed. He has been there for days now, infected by an unknown virus causing a dangerous fever. As the fever gets stronger, his consciousness fades away, further and further from reality. He slips away into a dream world. He is a grown man now; a warrior or Holy man of some kind; strong and determined. Traveling the landscape, which is enchantingly familiar, yet surreal and unknown. Now and then, when the fever stabilizes for a short while, the real world shines through. Sometimes in forms and shapes that fit his dream world -his mother, the doctor, the local priest… they all try to help him but seem powerless to do so. Though tempting, he is not quite ready to stay in this sanctuary, not ready to say goodbye… and so he travels on and on… searching for a way out. A price has to be paid...

== Tour dates ==
Date	City	Country	Venue
2 March 2012	Almere	Netherlands	Schouwburg Almere
7 March 2012	Utrecht	Netherlands	Vredenburg Leidsche Rijn
11 March 2012^{[1]}	Eindhoven	Netherlands	Muziekgebouw
12 March 2012	Eindhoven	Netherlands	Muziekgebouw
14 March 2012^{[1]}	Zwolle	Netherlands	Theater de Spiegel
17 March 2012^{[1]}	Tilburg	Netherlands	Theaters Tilburg
20 March 2012	Breda	Netherlands	Chassé Theater
21 March 2012	Heerlen	Netherlands	Theater Heerlen
22 March 2012^{[1]}	Heerlen	Netherlands	Theater Heerlen
24 March 2012^{[1]}	Groningen	Netherlands	De Oosterpoort
25 March 2012	Groningen	Netherlands	De Oosterpoort
26 March 2012	Roosendaal	Netherlands	Schouwburg de Kring
29 March 2012^{[1]}	Enschede	Netherlands	Stadsschouwburg
31 March 2012	Nijmegen	Netherlands	De Vereeniging
5 April 2012^{[1]}	Rotterdam	Netherlands	Nieuwe Luxor Theater
14 April 2012^{[1]}	Amsterdam	Netherlands	Koninklijk Theater Carré
15 April 2012	Amsterdam	Netherlands	Koninklijk Theater Carré

- 1 Sold out

== Personnel ==
=== Within Temptation ===
- Sharon den Adel – vocals
- Stefan Helleblad – rhythm guitar
- Ruud Jolie – lead guitar
- Martijn Spierenburg – keyboards
- Jeroen van Veen – bass guitar
- Mike Coolen – drums

=== Guest musicians ===
- Jonas Pap – cello
- Isabella Scholten – vocals on "Our Farewell" (played on tape)
- Robert Westerholt – guitar at Tilburg show
