= Shot in the Dark (Within Temptation song) =

Single by Within Temptation

from the album The Unforgiving
- Released: 12 September 2011 (iTunes)
- Genre: Symphonic rock; hard rock
- Length: 5:02 (album version); 3:41 (radio edit)
- Songwriters: Sharon den Adel; Robert Westerholt; Daniel Gibson
- Producer: Daniel Gibson

Within Temptation singles chronology
"Sinėad" (2011)	"Shot in the Dark" (2011)	"Paradise (What About Us?)" (2013)

Music video
- "Shot in the Dark" on YouTube

"Shot in the Dark" is a single from Within Temptation's fifth studio album The Unforgiving. The song had a promo radio release, but the physical single release, although confirmed on 30 September, never came about. It was released on iTunes on 12 September 2011. The music video, alongside the short film Triplets, is the last part of the combined The Unforgiving short movies, following "Mother Maiden", "Faster" and "Sinéad".

== Videos ==
=== Triplets short film ===
The film opens with a young boy named Daniel Faulkner, who is physically and mentally abused by his father, causing him to take on two more personalities; Trevor and William. We see Daniel fumbling with a grenade while having a conversation with his personalities about their abuse, who decide that the only way to resolve the situation is that they all die. The conversation is disturbed by their drunk father, who enters Daniel's (in which he is now alone) and marches him out of the room for punishment. Later we see Daniel in his bed as his father lies down next to him. At the same time, Daniel pulls the tab on his grenade and the explosion kills them both.

The film then skips to Daniel and his father's funeral, in which Mother Maiden wheels past the rows of empty seats and heads for Daniel's coffin, which has a framed picture of him on top. She places her hand on the coffin and it shakes violently, after which the lid flies off and Mother Maiden disappears. Daniel climbs out and leaps onto the other coffin, throwing his father's picture to the ground and smashing it. His split personalities also come back and climb out of the same coffin to join him.

=== Music video ===
The music video is shot in the same place as the Faster video. It is in black and white and features the band only. All band members are there with the drummer having a black sock over his face as when the video was shot his identity was not revealed. It seems he was an Italian doublebass player with great drum attitude contacted by common friends, while the band management was closing contract with the new drummer. Video was released on October 4, 2011.

== Track listing ==
No.	Title	Lyrics	Music	Length
1.	"Shot in the Dark" (radio edit)	Sharon den Adel; Robert Westerholt; Daniel Gibson	den Adel; Westerholt; Gibson	3:41

== Charts ==
Chart (2011)	Peak position
Belgium (Ultratip Bubbling Under Flanders)	10
Netherlands (Dutch Top 40 Tipparade)	13
