= The Unforgiving Tour =

2011–13 concert tour by Within Temptation

The Unforgiving World Tour
- Tour by Within Temptation
- Promotional artwork for "The Unforgiving Tour".
- Location: Europe; North America; South America
- Associated album: The Unforgiving
- Start date: 24 July 2011
- End date: 18 October 2013
- Legs: 7
- No. of shows: 111

Within Temptation concert chronology
- The Heart of Everything World Tour (2007–2008); The Unforgiving World Tour (2011–2013); Hydra World Tour (2014–2016)

The Unforgiving World Tour was a concert tour by the Dutch symphonic metal band Within Temptation in support of their fifth studio album, The Unforgiving, released by Roadrunner Records on 25 March 2011. It was their seventh major tour and their second to see them playing worldwide. The tour commenced on 10 August 2011, at the Sziget Festival, Hungary, and finished on 8 September 2013, at the Rock'n Coke Festival, in Turkey, passing mainly over Europe, with selected concerts in North America and South America. The tour helped on solidifying the band as one of mainland Europe's most successful symphonic metal acts, as it marked a major transition from club and theater to arena concerts on the continent than the previous one. On the North and South American concerts, however, the band still opted to play at smaller capacity venues. For the band's fifteenth anniversary, they held their biggest concert to date with a special presentation at the Sportpaleis, Belgium, featuring some of the band's ex-members on older songs and other special guests. The concert was later released as part of the Let Us Burn – Elements & Hydra Live in Concert live album.

== Background ==
The tour was scheduled to start immediately following The Unforgiving's release, however, due to Sharon den Adel's third pregnancy, the originally planned dates were rescheduled to begin in August 2011. The band did, however, play 7 days at the Vrienden Van Amstel Dutch Festival in January 2011, although they only performed 3 songs at each show (Ice Queen, Faster and Mother Earth), and also made several promotional appearances on European radio stations. On 10 August 2011, the band presented at the Sziget Festival, but The Unforgiving Tour officially started 12 August, at the Huntenpop Festival, in Ulft. This show as unique as the band performed The Unforgiving in its entirety, whilst enacting the album's concept through a new stage design, including lights, videos and other illusions. During August, the band performed at several Summer Festivals as M'era Luna and Lowlands and started an indoor tour in September, first in the North America and then crossing Europe. On early September, during their passage over Poland the album The Unforgiving reached Gold status there.

Later that month, it was announced that Guitarist Robert Westerholt would step down from touring with the band (with the exception of occasional shows) as there was no-one to look after his and vocalist Sharon den Adel's three children. Westerholt will continue to contribute on production and songwriting and will play guitar in the studio, while Stefan Helleblad will play guitar live.

In February 2012, the band brought the tour to South America, playing shows in Brazil, Mexico, Peru, Argentina and Chile. Following their March–April theatre tour, entitled Sanctuary, the band resumed The Unforgiving Tour with shows in some of the biggest European festivals in the summer of 2012, such as Sonisphere, Masters of Rock, Rock Werchter, Summerbreeze and Gods of Metal.

On 9 May 2012, the band officially announced a one-off show called "Elements" at the Sportpaleis in Antwerp in celebration of Within Temptation's 15-year anniversary. The band were accompanied by the Il Novecentro Orchestra and other special guests, including ex-band members and former Orphanage vocalist George Oosthoek. The show was sold out with fans from over 50 reported countries in attendance. The show would later appear on the Let Us Burn – Elements & Hydra Live in Concert live album.

== Reception ==
The tour was well received worldwide. PureGrainAudio, reviewing the band's concert in Baltimore, praised "Sharon's top-notch vocals and Martijn Spierenburg's keyboarding", as well as stating that, "aside from musical embellishments, the band came across as really simple and down-to-earth", ultimately deeming it "not just a concert, but an experience." This is Not a Scene, writing about the band's Manchester show, were also positive, commenting that "it was a gig deserving to be sold out and a beautiful night for all to witness." MetalConcerts reviewed their show in São Paulo, stating that "Within Temptation exhaled technique and talent, not to mention the charisma and respect they had with those that were there."

== Support ==
- Guild of Stags (12/08/2011, 21/09/2011–29/09/2011)
- 3 (07/09/2011–13/09/2011)
- Triggerfinger (06/10/2011–08/10/2011, 15/10/2011–28/10/2011)
- The Cannibal Queen (10/10/2011, 14/10/2011)
- Xandria (11/10/2011–12/10/2011)
- Anneke Van Giersbergen & Her Band (04/11/2011–25/11/2011)

== Tour dates ==
Date	City	Country	Venue
Summer Festivals
10 August 2011	Budapest	Hungary	Sziget Festival
12 August 2011	Ulft	Netherlands	Huntenpop Festival
13 August 2011	Hildesheim	Germany	M'era Luna Festival
14 August 2011	Zofingen	Switzerland	Heitere Open Air
~~19 August 2011~~	~~Hasselt~~	~~Belgium~~	~~Pukkelpop~~ ^{[A]}
20 August 2011	Biddinghuizen	Netherlands	Lowlands
25 August 2011	Raalte	Netherlands	Stöppelhaene
27 August 2011	Lieshout	Netherlands	Bavaria Open Air
28 August 2011	Târgu Mureș	Romania	Peninsula Felsziget
North America
7 September 2011	Toronto	Canada	Sound Academy
8 September 2011	Montreal	Canada	Métropolis
9 September 2011	Worcester	United States	Palladium
10 September 2011	New York City	United States	Terminal 5
12 September 2011	Baltimore	United States	Rams Head Live!
13 September 2011	Philadelphia	United States	Electric Factory
Europe
21 September 2011	Heerhugowaard	Netherlands	Waerdse Tempel
23 September 2011	Tilburg	Netherlands	013
25 September 2011	Tilburg	Netherlands	013
27 September 2011	Amsterdam	Netherlands	Paradiso
28 September 2011	Amsterdam	Netherlands	Paradiso
29 September 2011	Groningen	Netherlands	Oosterpoort
6 October 2011	Lille	France	L’aéronef
7 October 2011	Nantes	France	Le Zénith
8 October 2011	Lyon	France	Le Transbordeur
10 October 2011	Madrid	Spain	La Riviera
11 October 2011	Porto	Portugal	Coliseum
12 October 2011	Lisbon	Portugal	Recreations Coliseum
14 October 2011	Barcelona	Spain	Razzmatazz
15 October 2011	Toulouse	France	Le Bikini
17 October 2011	Milan	Italy	Alcatraz
18 October 2011	Zürich	Switzerland	Volkshaus
20 October 2011	Vienna	Austria	Gasometer
21 October 2011	Prague	Czech Republic	Malá Sportovní Hala
22 October 2011	Kraków	Poland	Hala Wisla
23 October 2011	Warsaw	Poland	Stodola Club
25 October 2011	Copenhagen	Denmark	Falkoner Center
26 October 2011	Gothenburg	Sweden	Trädgårn Club
27 October 2011	Stockholm	Sweden	Arena
28 October 2011	Oslo	Norway	Sentrum Scene
4 November 2011	Esch-sur-Alzette	Luxembourg	Rockhal
5 November 2011	Kerkrade	Netherlands	Rodahal
6 November 2011	Paris	France	Zénith Paris
8 November 2011	Birmingham	England	O2 Academy Birmingham
9 November 2011	Manchester	England	O2 Academy
10 November 2011	Glasgow	Scotland	Barrowland Ballroom
11 November 2011	London	England	O2 Academy Brixton
13 November 2011	Brussels	Belgium	Ancienne Belgique
15 November 2011	Stuttgart	Germany	Longhorn Club
16 November 2011	Cologne	Germany	E-Werk
17 November 2011	Cologne	Germany	E-Werk
19 November 2011	Hamburg	Germany	Docks
20 November 2011	Hamburg	Germany	Docks
21 November 2011	Berlin	Germany	Columbiahalle
23 November 2011	Dresden	Germany	Schlachthof
24 November 2011	Munich	Germany	Zenith
25 November 2011	Neu-Isenburg	Germany	Hugenottenhalle
26 November 2011	Sursee	Switzerland	Rocksound Festival
10 December 2011	Helsinki	Finland	The Circus
12 December 2011	Saint Petersburg	Russia	Kosmonavt
13 December 2011	Saint Petersburg	Russia	Kosmonavt
14 December 2011	Moscow	Russia	Club Milk
Latin America
2 February 2012	Mexico City	Mexico	Circo Volador
4 February 2012	Quito	Ecuador	TelefériQo
~~5 February 2012~~	~~Bogotá~~	~~Colombia~~	~~Teatro Metropol~~^{[B]}
7 February 2012	Lima	Peru	Centro de Convenciones Scencia
8 February 2012	Santiago	Chile	Teatro Caupolicán
10 February 2012	Buenos Aires	Argentina	Teatro Flores
11 February 2012	São Paulo	Brazil	Espaço Victory
12 February 2012	Rio de Janeiro	Brazil	Circo Voador
Summer Festivals 2
7 April 2012	Schijndel	Netherlands	Paaspop
17 May 2012	Hellendoorn	Netherlands	Dauwpop
26 May 2012	Madrid	Spain	Sonisphere Festival
1 June 2012	Oosterhout	Netherlands	Parkfeest
~~8 June 2012~~	~~Nickelsdorf~~	~~Austria~~	~~Nova Rock Festival~~ ^{[C]}
9 June 2012	Kaarina	Finland	Saaristo Open Air
15 June 2012	Gothenburg	Sweden	Metaltown Festival
16 June 2012	Clisson	France	Hellfest
22 June 2012	Milan	Italy	Gods of Metal
23 June 2012	Heerlen	Netherlands	Park City Live
~~27 June 2012~~	~~Kyiv~~	~~Ukraine~~	~~Global East Rock Festival~~^{[D]}
28 June 2012	Werchter	Belgium	Rock Werchter
30 June 2012	Arras	France	Main Square Festival
1 July 2012	Bucharest	Romania	Tuborg GreenFest
~~6 July 2012~~	~~Knebworth~~	~~England~~	~~Sonisphere~~^{[E]}
7 July 2012	Istanbul	Turkey	Tuborg GoldFest
8 July 2012	Sofia	Bulgaria	Sofia Rocks
12 July 2012	Vizovice	Czech Republic	Masters of Rock
20 July 2012	Lichtenvoorde	Netherlands	Zwarte Cross
21 July 2012	Jarocin	Poland	Jarocin Festival
22 July 2012	Cuxhaven	Germany	Deichbrand
5 August 2012	Colmar	France	La Foire aux Vins d'Alsace
17 August 2012	Dinkelsbühl	Germany	Summerbreeze
19 August 2012	Sachsen	Germany	Highfield
7 September 2012	Tiel	Netherlands	Appelpop
8 September 2012	Kyiv	Ukraine	Gasoline Festival
Elements
13 November 2012	Antwerp	Belgium	Sportpaleis
Summer Festivals 3
27 April 2013	Pijnacker	Netherlands	Oranjefesteen
18 May 2013	Kraków	Poland	Czýzynalia
13 June 2013	Interlaken	Switzerland	Greenfield Festival
14 June 2013	Nickelsdorf	Austria	Nova Rock Festival
15 June 2013	Broek op Langedijk	Netherlands	Indian Summer Festival
28 June 2013	Spálené Poříčí	Czech Republic	Basinfirefest
29 June 2013	Dessel	Belgium	Graspop Metal Meeting
30 June 2013	Moscow	Russia	Park Live Festival
14 July 2013	Weert	Netherlands	Bospop
25 July 2013	Tienen	Belgium	Suikerrock
26 July 2013	Oulu	Finland	Qstock
2 August 2013	Lierop	Netherlands	Tuinfeest Nirwana
9 August 2013	Sibiu	Romania	Artmania Festival
10 August 2013	Gävle	Sweden	Getaway Rock Festival
23 August 2013	Trondheim	Norway	Trondheim Concerts
30 August 2013	Bilbao	Spain	En Vivo
8 September 2013	Istanbul	Turkey	Rock’n Coke

- A Cancelled due to heavy weather.
- B Cancelled due to scheduling problems.
- C Cancelled due to heavy weather.
- D Cancelled due to scheduling problems.
- E Cancelled due to scheduling problems.

== Extra shows ==
Date	City	Country	Venue	Event
21 January 2011	Rotterdam	Netherlands	Rotterdam Ahoy	Vrienden Van Amstel Live
22 January 2011	Rotterdam	Netherlands	Rotterdam Ahoy	Vrienden Van Amstel Live
23 January 2011	Rotterdam	Netherlands	Rotterdam Ahoy	Vrienden Van Amstel Live
26 January 2011	Rotterdam	Netherlands	Rotterdam Ahoy	Vrienden Van Amstel Live
27 January 2011	Rotterdam	Netherlands	Rotterdam Ahoy	Vrienden Van Amstel Live
28 January 2011	Rotterdam	Netherlands	Rotterdam Ahoy	Vrienden Van Amstel Live
29 January 2011	Rotterdam	Netherlands	Rotterdam Ahoy	Vrienden Van Amstel Live
22 September 2011	Utrecht	Netherlands	Stadsschouwburg	Dutch Film Festival
17 November 2011	Cologne	Germany	Hard Rock Cafe	Pinktober
10 July 2012	Beirut	Lebanon	Forum de Beyroth	Extra club-shows during Summer Festivals
18 August 2012	Saarbrücken	Germany	E-Werk	Extra club-shows during Summer Festivals
8 November 2012	Haarlem	Netherlands	Patronaat	Elements try-out concert
9 November 2012	Haarlem	Netherlands	Patronaat	Elements try-out concert
29 April 2013	Amsterdam	Netherlands	Grand Hotel Krasnapolsky	Live at Q-hotel

== Personnel ==
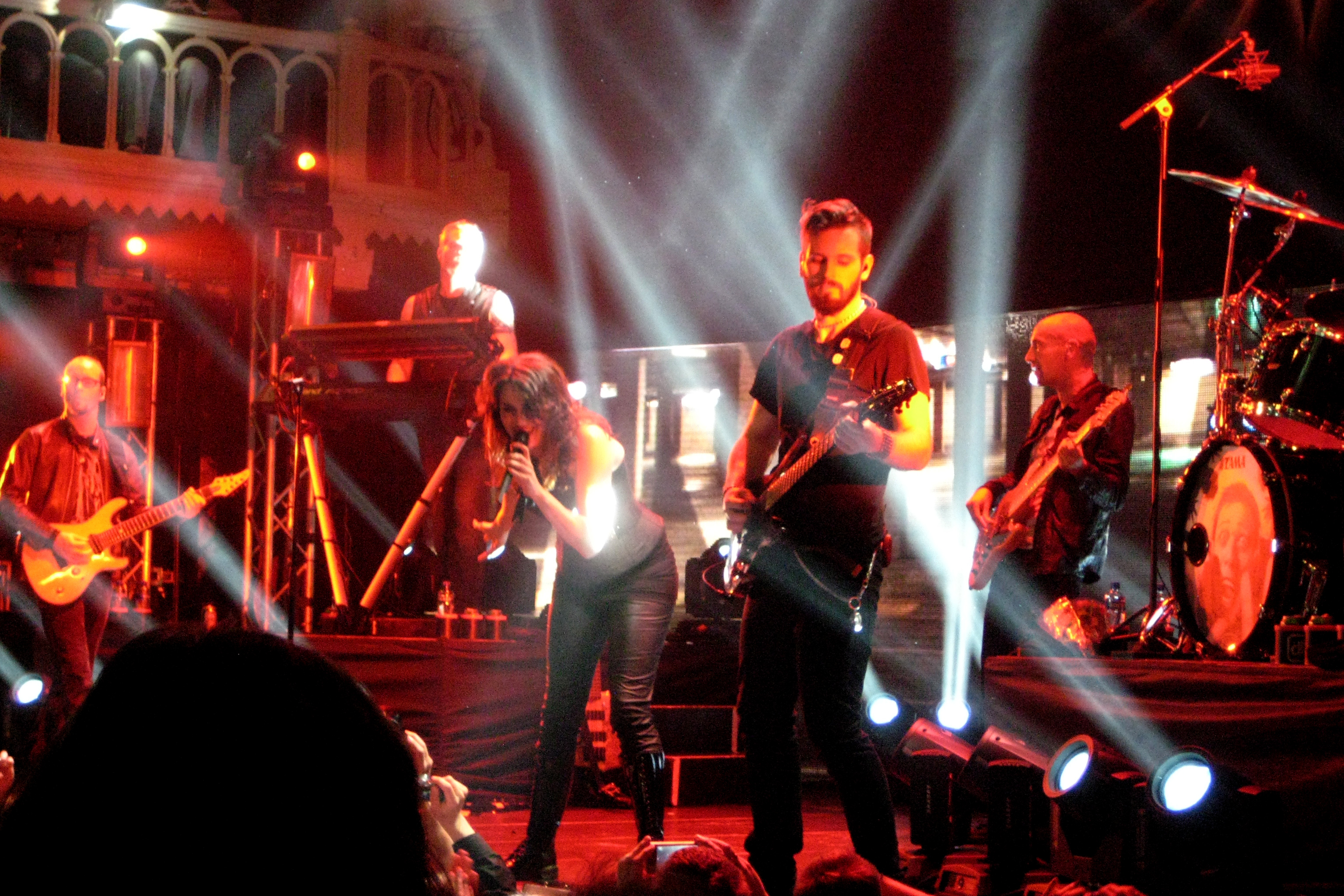
Within Temptation live at the Paradiso during the first European Leg of the tour.

=== Within Temptation ===
- Sharon den Adel – vocals
- Robert Westerholt – rhythm guitar (from 10 August to 13 September 2011 and at Elements)
- Stefan Helleblad – rhythm guitar (21 September onwards)
- Ruud Jolie – lead guitar
- Martijn Spierenburg – keyboards
- Jeroen van Veen – bass guitar
- Mike Coolen – drums

=== Guest musicians ===
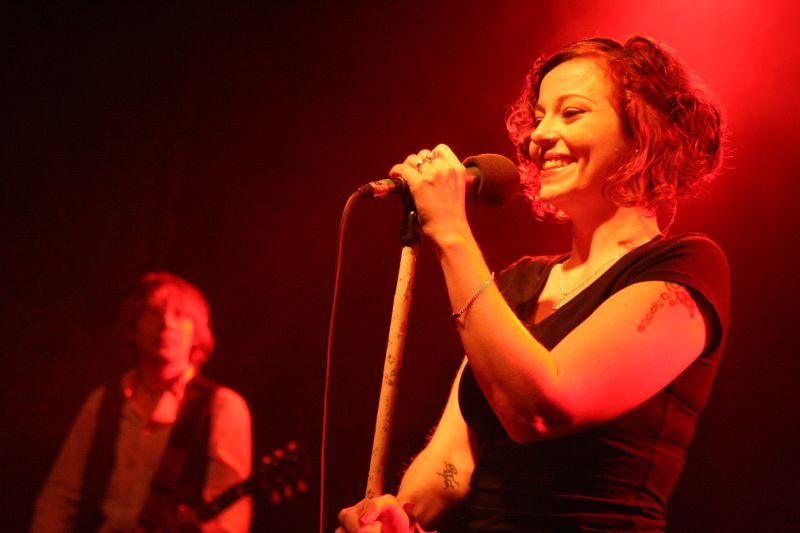
Former The Gathering singer Anneke Van Giersbergen participated as a supporting act on selected dates and occasionally as a guest vocalist on the song "Fire and Ice".

- Anneke van Giersbergen – featured vocals on "Fire and Ice" on 24 and 25 November 2011 and on "Somewhere" on 10 July 2012.
- George Oosthoek – featured vocals on "Candles" at Elements
- Ivar de Graaf – acoustic guitar on "Never-Ending Story" and drums on "Summertime Sadness" at Elements
- Martijn Westerholt – keyboards on "Candles" at Elements
- Michiel Papenhove – guitars on "Candles" at Elements
- Isabella Scholten – featured vocals on "Our Farewell" at Elements
