= Fire and Ice (Within Temptation song) =

Song by Within Temptation

from the album The Unforgiving
- Released: December 20, 2011
- Genre: Symphonic metal, gothic metal
- Length: 3:51 (album version)
- Songwriters: Sharon den Adel; Robert Westerholt; Martijn Spierenburg
- Producer: Daniel Gibson

Music video
- "Fire and Ice" on YouTube

"Fire and Ice" is a song written by Sharon den Adel, Robert Westerholt and Martijn Spierenburg for the album The Unforgiving (2011). The music video was released on YouTube on December 20, 2011, and it was used to promote Within Temptation's The Unforgiving Tour (2011-2012).

== Music video ==
Besides some live footage from Within Temptation's performing on the Lowlands music festival, the music video follows the story of a fallen angel who becomes a human due to its weakness on fighting and suffers from it.

== Notes ==
The footage used to tell the music video history is the same used at the screen on the tour shows.
