= The Q-Music Sessions =

The Q-music Sessions

Compilation album by Within Temptation
- Released: 19 April 2013 (Netherlands and Belgium)
- Recorded: June–September 2012
- Genre: Symphonic rock; pop metal; symphonic metal
- Length: 39:49
- Label: BMG
- Producer: Within Temptation

Within Temptation chronology
The Unforgiving (2011)	The Q-music Sessions (2013)	Hydra (2014)

Singles from The Q-Music Sessions
- 1. "Crazy" Released: 21 September 2012; 2. "Grenade" Released: 4 October 2012

The Q-music Sessions is a special Within Temptation cover album in which consists of eleven covers made by the band for Qmusic (Netherlands) and Qmusic (Belgium) in celebration of their fifteenth anniversary. Due to the positive reactions from fans and the radio audience, the band decided to release a special album containing eleven of the fifteen covers made. In June 2021, The Q-music Sessions was released worldwide on all streaming platforms.

== Background ==
In the run up to the 15th anniversary of Within Temptation, the band was asked by Q-Music to choose and perform an existing track in a "Within Temptation style" once a week during fifteen weeks during their special program Within Temptation Friday. The covers consist mostly of pop songs in which the band transformed into a more symphonic oriented form. Lead vocalist Sharon den Adel stated that: “Our approach was to really make the cover a new Within Temptation song. So not going the easy way by using only a piano or an acoustic guitar for example, but really trying to put all the elements of a Within Temptation track in this new version. It was quite a challenge because we had only one week to get it right, while recording an original Within Temptation song can sometimes takes up half a year! But this pressure also gave us an [sic] creative boost and it was very rewarding to get it done in time each week. Also, we learned a lot from the in-depth analysis we needed to make on these hits, written by others, in combination with implementing our own sound and style in each new cover. We are glad that we’ve taken up this challenge and are very proud of the result.". They covered artists such as Imagine Dragons, OneRepublic, Lana Del Rey, The Who among others.

== Missing songs ==
The band also did four more covers for the radio station, "Little Lion Man" (Mumford & Sons), "Somebody That I Used to Know" (Gotye), "Skyfall" (Adele) and "Paradise" (Coldplay), but the songs were not included on the album due to copyright issues from the original artists.

== Track listing ==
No.	Title	Writer(s)	Length
1.	"Grenade (Bruno Mars)"	Bruno Mars, Philip Lawrence, Ari Levine, Brody Brown, Claude Kelly, Andrew Wyatt	3:45
2.	"Titanium (David Guetta featuring Sia)"	Sia Furler, David Guetta, Giorgio Tuinfort, Nick Van De Wall	3:57
3.	"Let Her Go (Passenger)"	Mike Rosenberg	3:43
4.	"Summertime Sadness (Lana Del Rey)"	Lana Del Rey, Rick Nowels	4:06
5.	"Radioactive (Imagine Dragons)"	Ben McKee, Dan Platzman, Dan Reynolds, Wayne Sermon, Alexander Grant, Josh Mosser	3:14
6.	"Crazy (Gnarls Barkley)"	Brian Burton, Thomas Callaway, Gian Franco Reverberi, Gian Piero Reverberi	3:31
7.	"Dirty Dancer (Enrique Iglesias)"	Enrique Iglesias, Nadir Khayat, Evan Bogart, Erika Nuri, David Quiñones	4:14
8.	"Don't You Worry Child (Swedish House Mafia)"	Axel Hedfors, Steve Angello, Sebastian Ingrosso, John Martin Lindström, Michel Zitron	3:36
9.	"Behind Blue Eyes (The Who)"	Pete Townshend	4:19
10.	"The Power of Love (Frankie Goes to Hollywood)"	Holly Johnson, Peter Gill, Mark O'Toole, Brian Nash	3:59
11.	"Apologize (OneRepublic)"	Ryan Tedder	3:25

== Charts ==
=== Weekly charts ===
Chart (2013)	Peak position
Belgian Albums (Ultratop Flanders)	4
Belgian Albums (Ultratop Wallonia)	34
Dutch Albums (Album Top 100)	5

=== Year-end charts ===
Chart (2013)	Position
Belgium Albums Chart	91
