= Sinéad (song) =

Single by Within Temptation

from the album The Unforgiving
- B-side: "Empty Eyes"
- Released: 15 July 2011
- Genre: Symphonic rock
- Length: 3:52 (single version)
- Label: Roadrunner
- Songwriters: den Adel; Westerholt; Gibson; Martijn Spierenburg

Within Temptation singles chronology
| "Faster" (2011) | "Sinéad" (2011) | "Shot in the Dark" (2011) |

"Sinéad" is the second single from Within Temptation's fifth studio album, The Unforgiving, released on 15 July 2011. Its release was announced alongside the unveiling of its artwork on 15 April 2011. On 19 May 2011, the band announced that the single would contain special dance remixes, and confirming on 10 June that there would be four different versions by Benno de Goeij, Scooter, VNV Nation and Groove Coverage. "Empty Eyes" was the B-side on the five-track maxi CD.

== Track listing ==
Two-track German CD

1. "Sinéad" (single version) – 3:52
2. "Sinéad" (Scooter remix) – 3:46

Five-track maxi CD

1. "Sinéad" (single version) – 3:52
2. "Empty Eyes" – 3:42
3. "Sinéad" (VNV Nation remix) – 6:30
4. "Sinéad" (Scooter remix) – 3:46
5. "Sinéad" (Groove Coverage remix) – 4:53

Digital Audio Bundle
| No. | Title | Length |
|---|---|---|
| 1. | "Sinéad (single version)" | 3:52 |
| 2. | "Sinéad (VNV Nation remix)" | 6:30 |
| 3. | "Sinéad (Scooter remix)" | 3:46 |
| 4. | "Sinéad (Groove Coverage remix)" | 4:53 |
| 5. | "Sinéad (Groove Coverage remix-edit)" | 3:35 |
| 6. | "Sinéad (VNV Nation remix-edit)" | 3:56 |

Digital Combo Bundle
| No. | Title | Length |
|---|---|---|
| 1. | "Sinéad (single version)" | 3:52 |
| 2. | "Sinéad (VNV Nation remix)" | 6:30 |
| 3. | "Sinéad (Scooter remix)" | 3:46 |
| 4. | "Sinéad (Groove Coverage remix)" | 4:53 |
| 5. | "Sinéad (Groove Coverage remix-edit)" | 3:35 |
| 6. | "Sinéad (VNV Nation remix-edit)" | 3:56 |
| 7. | "Sinéad (video broadcast version)" | 4:23 |

Digital Combo Bundle exclusive (Musicload exclusive edition)
| No. | Title | Length |
|---|---|---|
| 1. | "Sinéad (single version)" | 3:52 |
| 2. | "Sinéad (VNV Nation remix)" | 6:30 |
| 3. | "Sinéad (Groove Coverage remix)" | 4:53 |
| 4. | "Sinéad (Scooter remix)" | 3:46 |
| 5. | "Sinéad (Groove Coverage remix-edit)" | 3:35 |
| 6. | "Sinéad (VNV Nation remix-edit)" | 3:56 |
| 7. | "Sinéad (Benno de Goeij remix)" | 3:04 |
| 8. | "Sinéad (video broadcast version)" | 4:23 |

Digital Combo Bundle one – iTunes UK
| No. | Title | Length |
|---|---|---|
| 1. | "Sinéad (single version)" | 3:52 |
| 2. | "Sinéad (Scooter remix)" | 3:46 |
| 3. | "Sinéad (VNV Nation remix)" | 6:30 |
| 4. | "Sinéad (video broadcast version)" | 4:23 |

The Remixes – EP (iTunes)
| No. | Title | Length |
|---|---|---|
| 1. | "Sinéad (Benno de Goeij remix)" | 3:04 |
| 2. | "Sinéad (Myon & Shane 54 triplet monster mix)" | 8:27 |
| 3. | "Sinéad (Clashback club mix)" | 6:06 |
| 4. | "Sinéad (Clashback radio edit)" | 2:53 |

== Charts ==
| Chart (2011) | Peak position |
|---|---|
| Austria (Ö3 Austria Top 40) | 25 |
| Belgium (Ultratip Bubbling Under Flanders) | 11 |
| Czech Republic (Modern Rock) | 11 |
| Germany (GfK) | 64 |
| Hungary (Single Top 40) | 19 |
| Netherlands (Dutch Top 40 Tipparade) | 15 |
