= The Unforgiving =

Studio album by Within Temptation
- Released: 25 March 2011
- Recorded: April–December 2010
- Studios: The Metal Cemetery, Power Sound Studio, Amsterdam, Netherlands
- Genres: Symphonic metal; symphonic rock
- Length: 53:41
- Labels: Dragnet/Sony (Europe); Roadrunner (US and Japan)
- Producers: Daniel Gibson; Stefan Helleblad

Within Temptation chronology
The Heart of Everything (2007)	The Unforgiving (2011)	The Q-Music Sessions (2013)

Singles from The Unforgiving
- 1. "Faster" Released: 21 January 2011; 2. "Sinéad" Released: 15 July 2011; 3. "Shot in the Dark" Released: 9 September 2011

The Unforgiving is the fifth studio album by Dutch symphonic metal band Within Temptation, released by Roadrunner Records on 25 March 2011. It was a concept album as one part of a transmedia storytelling project, which accompanied the release of three short films and a series of six comic books. The album followed the band's pattern of incorporating new musical elements on each release, this time marking a major transition point for the band and featuring more pop and 80s influences. Lyrically, the band focused on telling a story with specific characters, also present in the films and comic books.

Three singles were released for promoting the album. "Faster", the leading single, was released on 21 January 2011. The second single was "Sinéad", released on 21 March. The third and final one, "Shot in the Dark" was released on 12 September. Each single accompanied a short film in order to visually describe the story being told. The group also commenced The Unforgiving Tour in Europe by the middle of 2011. The tour later passed over North America and Latin America for a total amount of 111 concerts.

The album received generally favorable reviews from music critics, and the composition, storytelling and musical changes were the most discussed points. Reviewers from Big Cheese and sputnikmusic were welcoming of the band's changes and the transmedia effort, while Kerrang! and Q magazine were more critical. The album also achieved commercial success, entering top ten positions in countries such as the Netherlands, Belgium, Finland, Germany and Austria.

== Concept ==
=== Early ideas, realisation and development ===
The initial concept was to write the soundtrack to a film. The band decided to change direction given the inconsistencies and other issues which movies can undergo. As vocalist Sharon den Adel commented:

"What happened was that we wanted to write lyrics for a movie. We were searching for a good movie with a good story and everybody had different release dates. If something goes wrong, a movie can very easily be postponed for a year, and we couldn't take the chance to have to wait for that, otherwise we would have had to postpone our album as well. So we decided to take the matter in our own hands."

In searching for a new concept, they approached the writer of The Chronicles of Spellborn comics, who introduced the band to Steven O'Connell. However, upon his first meeting with the band, he failed to impress them with ideas involving zombies and fantasy, while they were hoping for a more mature approach rather than something unclear and superficial. Sharon explained that, in trying to describe to O'Connell what they were looking for,

"We told him what kind of movies we liked, what kind of books we read, and he thought about it and he came up with a basic idea, like 2 or 3 lines. The story is about people who have done bad things. Not because they are bad, but because they made bad decisions."

Following the formation of the initial ideas, O'Connell completed the rest of the story with additional suggestions from the band. For example, Sinéad was initially a South American woman named Maya, but, as the music to "Sinéad" had already been completed, Sharon requested that the name and nationality be changed. While shooting the three short films and music videos, Mother Maiden ("Faster"), Sinéad and Triplets ("Shot in the Dark"), the band and director (Joeri Holsheimer) came up with several other ideas, among them which song would connect to which story. The band's decision to shoot three short films was mostly to avoid the restrictions imposed on music videos, as Sharon explained:

"...we wanted to put all the money into the movies. You have a budget and then you have to make choices and, to be honest, MTV and everything, it is not so big anymore. And when you make videos, they always say "you can't use blood, you can't use guns, you can't use..." and we wanted to use everything: blood, guns... everything!"

=== As part of transmedia project ===
A comic book of the same name, released simultaneously, was written by Steven O'Connell (BloodRayne and Dark 48) and illustrated by Romano Molenaar (Witchblade, The Darkness and X-Men). Three related short films were released prior to the album, the first of which, "Mother Maiden", was released on 31 January 2011. The first issue of the comic books, Penance, Part One, was released on 18 March 2011, and digitally released by Diamond Digital at the New York Comic Con on 22 October. The second issue, Penance, Part Two was released on 13 May. The third issue, Penance, Part Three, was released on 31 August and the fourth issue, Penance, Part Four, on 2 November.

== Background ==
=== Recording ===
The band first announced that they intended to make a new album in October 2008, as they were finishing touring in support of The Heart of Everything. The album was originally planned to be recorded in 2009, but was further delayed by vocalist Sharon den Adel giving birth to her and guitarist Robert Westerholt's second child. In an interview with Metal Ways at Appelpop 2008, Westerholt stated that the new album was "probably going to be kind of a concept, but it's so early still that nothing is really sure yet. But we're trying to look in that direction."

The album was eventually recorded in the Summer and Autumn of 2010, with the band announcing via their website in November that the album would be entitled The Unforgiving, expected for release in March 2011. The band also announced that their planned tour dates, beginning in March 2011, had been postponed till Autumn due to den Adel's third pregnancy.

=== Previews and promotion ===
A video for "Where Is the Edge" was released on 15 December 2010, along with footage from the upcoming film Me and Mr Jones on Natalee Island. The band also announced that the album would be released alongside a comic book series with the same name, forming a story surrounding the main protagonist, Sinéad.

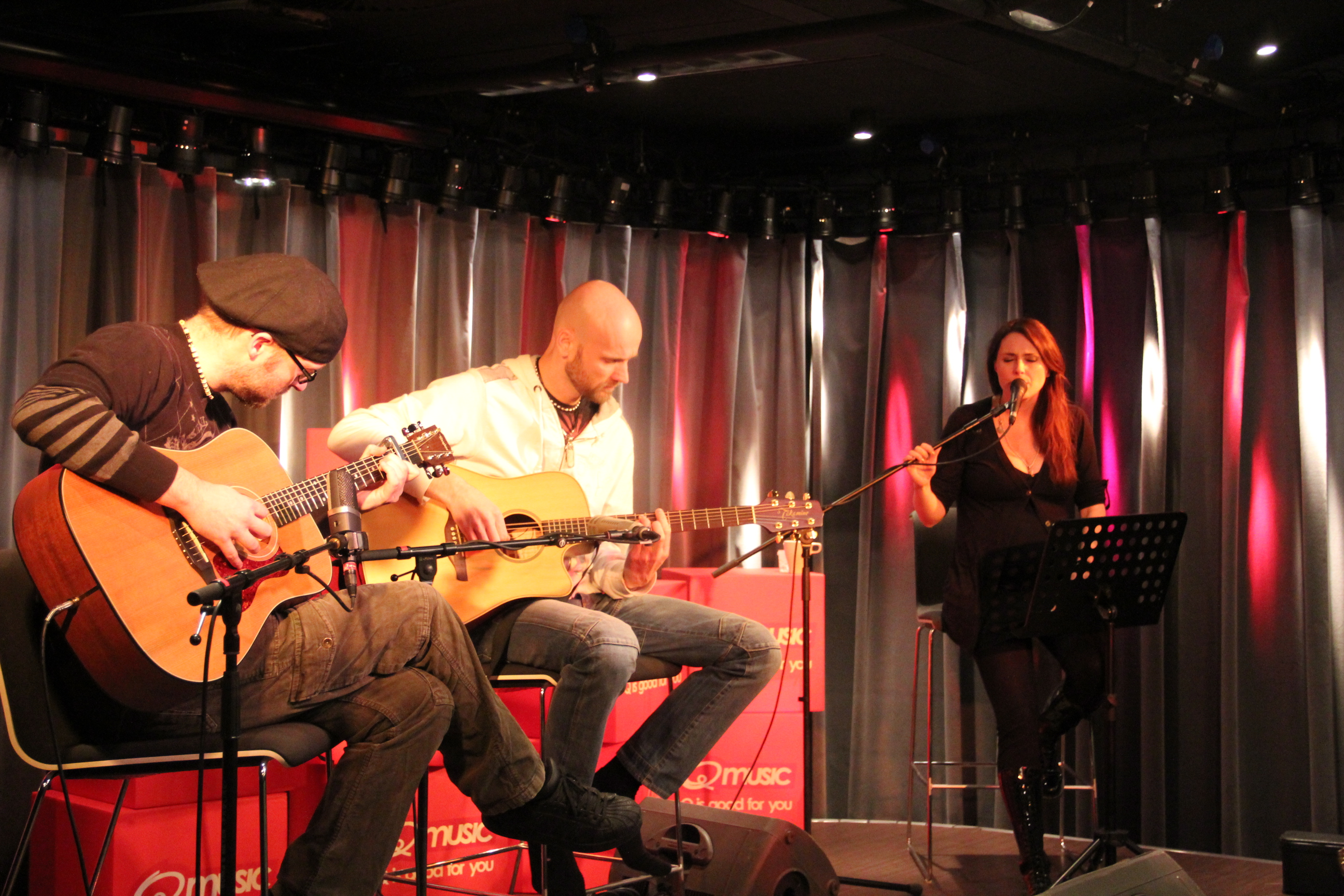
Members of Within Temptation giving an acoustic performance at Q Music studios

On 4 December Sharon commented via their official website that they had recorded three upcoming promotional music videos within the course of a week. The band also revealed that, alongside the record and the comic book series, three short films were to be released prior to the album.

The first single, "Faster", had its worldwide radio première on 96.3 Rock Radio on 21 January 2011. This was followed by the release of its music video on 31 January, along with the first short film, Mother Maiden. The band also announced that each of the remaining films would also accompany a band performance. An album trailer, featuring a clip of the new song "In the Middle of the Night" was released on 17 January 2011.

On 3 February 2011, the first English review of the album was published by a freelance journalist online via last.fm and his blog. Still in February, members of Within Temptation were in Paris to promote their new album in France. A first French interview with Sharon Den Adel was published on Metal-Ways.com (in English).

Sinéad, the second short film, was released on 21 March. The accompanying music video was officially released on 10 June 2011 to promote the song's single of the same name, which was released on 15 July. The single differs from the others, as it includes four remixes of the track by four different dance producers. The band also went to Germany to promote the single on Television.

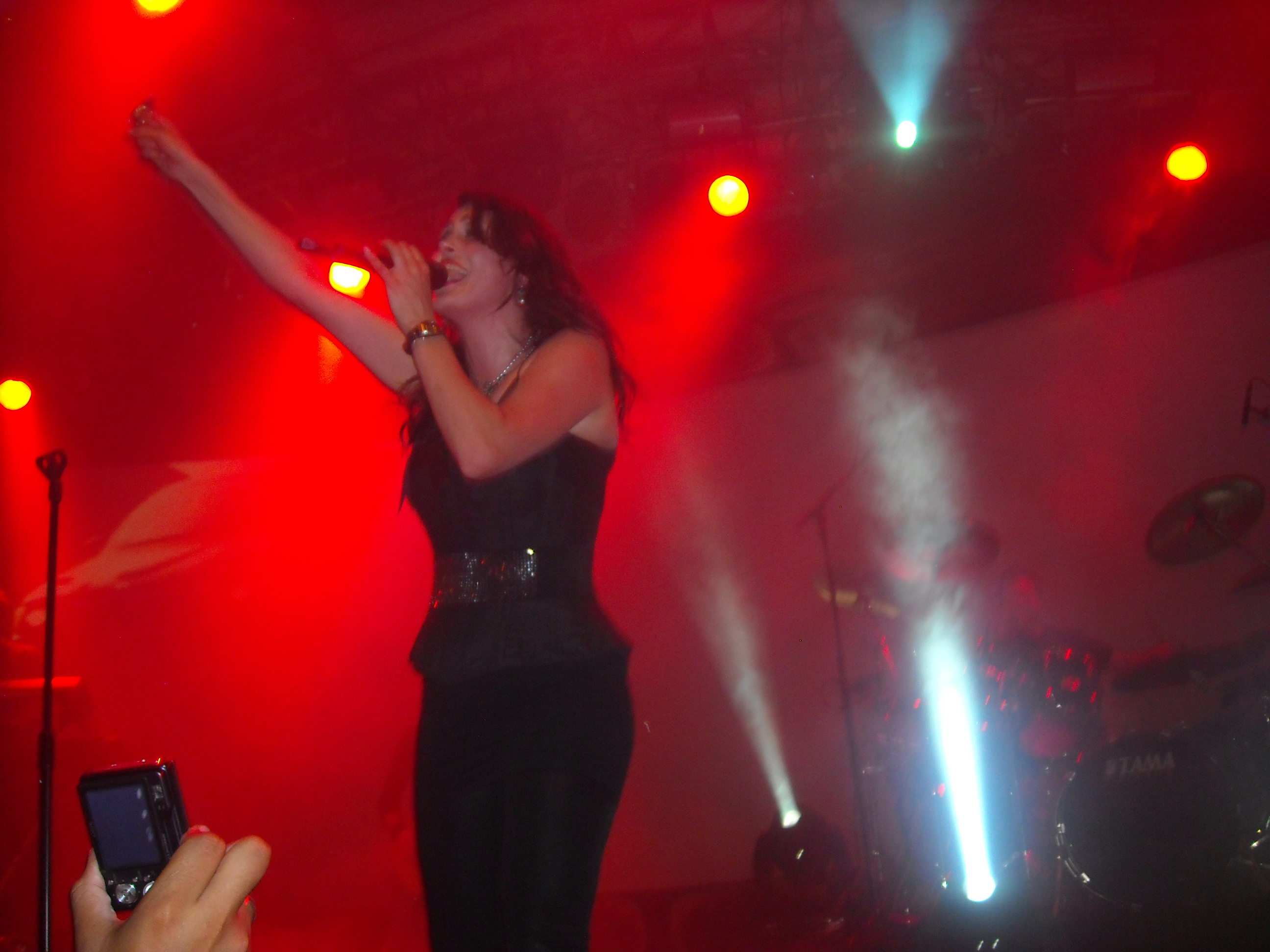
Lead vocalist Sharon den Adel during a concert in Rio de Janeiro

The band commenced The Unforgiving Tour on 10 August at the Sziget Festival, Hungary, playing a selection of songs from The Unforgiving as well as some of their more popular tracks. At the Huntenpop Festival, Netherlands, The Unforgiving was played in its entirety, as well as some older songs. Within Temptation went on to perform at several more summer festivals, such as M'era Luna and Heitere Open Air, before commencing a North American Tour and an indoor European tour in the winter.

On 22 September 2011, the band performed "Where Is the Edge" and "Lost" at the première of Me and Mr Jones on Natalee Island during the 31st Netherlands Film Festival, where the three The Unforgiving short-films were screened.

The final short film, Triplets, was released on 1 September 2011. Its accompanying music video "Shot In the Dark" was officially released on 4 October.

On 20 December, the band released their new music video, Fire and Ice.

To continue promoting the album, the band started a South American tour, visiting Brazil, Chile, Argentina, Peru and Ecuador. After that, the band went back to Europe to headline several of the biggest European summer festivals, such as Sonisphere, Masters of Rock, Rock Werchter, Summerbreeze and Gods of Metal.

== Reception ==
Professional ratings
Aggregate scores
Source	Rating
Metacritic	63/100
Review scores
Source	Rating
AllMusic	3.5/5 stars
Big Cheese	5/5 stars
Classic Rock	3.5/5 stars
Kerrang!	3/5 stars
Metal Hammer	3.5/5 stars
Q	1/5 stars
Rocksound	9/10
Sputnikmusic	4/5 stars

Reviews from critics have been mostly positive, with particular praise for den Adel's voice and the band's innovative capacity. Metal Marketing commented on its "change in pace", calling it a career "turning point", but adding that it is "one of the best albums... in a long time", giving it 9.5 out of 10. UK punk, rock and metal magazine, Big Cheese, were also very positive, giving it 5 out of 5 and remarking, "Every song is glorious and frontwoman Sharon den Adel truly is the star of this spectacular show."

Metal Hammer were less favourable, giving the album a lower score of 7 out of 10, noting that fans of their former Celtic sound and "metallic symphonic thunder" may be disappointed, although praising the band for being "exceptional songwriters" and their shift in style, creating "an apt thriller soundtrack without losing their trademark symphonic elements". Classic Rock also gave it 7 out of 10, calling it "grandstanding stuff, multi-layered, complex and rich" as well as "overblown". Allmusic gave it 3.5 out of 5, stating that it "doesn't come off bombastic or overwrought" and that the band lets "the songwriting rule supreme".

Kerrang! were more negative, giving it a "good" score of just 3 out of 5 and deeming it "pretty unsatisfying", while conceding it to be "flawless and expertly crafted". Q gave it just 1 out of 5, the album's lowest rating, labelling the band "the metal T'Pau".

The album currently holds a score of 63 at the aggregate review site Metacritic, indicating "generally favourable reviews".

The Unforgiving was voted fourth and ninth in Roadrunner Records' Album of the Year and Album of the Century polls respectively. Metal Storm's readers awarded the album third place on its best symphonic metal albums of 2011 list and seventh on the "biggest surprise" list. It was also awarded fifth place in Loudwire's list of The Top 10 Rock Albums of 2011. Merlin Alderslade, from Metal Hammer, placed the album at ninth position in his top ten albums of 2011.

=== Critics' lists ===
Critic/Publication	List	Rank	Ref.
Loudwire	Top 10 Rock Albums of 2011	5	
Metal Hammer	Merlin Alderslade's Top 10 Albums of 2011	9	
Metalholic	50 Best Metal Albums of 2011	9	

=== Accolades ===
Year	Ceremony	Award	Result
2011	Loudwire Music Awards	Rock Album of the Year	Won
2011	Buma Cultuur Awards	Buma Music in Motion	Won

== Track listing ==
Standard edition
No.	Title	Lyrics	Music	Length
1.	"Why Not Me"	Sharon den Adel; Robert Westerholt	den Adel; Westerholt	0:34
2.	"Shot in the Dark"	den Adel; Westerholt; Daniel Gibson	den Adel; Westerholt; Gibson	5:02
3.	"In the Middle of the Night"	den Adel; Westerholt; Gibson	den Adel; Westerholt; Gibson	5:11
4.	"Faster"	den Adel; Westerholt; Gibson	den Adel; Westerholt; Gibson	4:23
5.	"Fire and Ice"	den Adel; Westerholt	den Adel; Spierenburg	3:57
6.	"Iron"	den Adel; Westerholt	Westerholt; Gibson	5:40
7.	"Where Is the Edge"	den Adel; Westerholt; Gibson	den Adel; Westerholt; Gibson	3:59
8.	"Sinéad"	den Adel; Westerholt; Gibson; Martijn Spierenburg	den Adel; Westerholt; Gibson; Spierenburg	4:23
9.	"Lost"	den Adel; Westerholt; Gibson	den Adel; Westerholt; Gibson	5:14
10.	"Murder"	den Adel; Westerholt; Gibson	den Adel; Westerholt; Gibson	4:16
11.	"A Demon's Fate"	den Adel; Westerholt	den Adel; Gibson	5:30
12.	"Stairway to the Skies"	den Adel; Westerholt	den Adel; Spierenburg	5:32
Total length:				53:41

German edition / Saturn edition bonus track
No.	Title	Lyrics	Music	Length
13.	"The Last Dance"	den Adel; Westerholt; Spierenburg	den Adel; Westerholt; Spierenburg	4:26
Total length:				58:08

German Standard edition bonus track
No.	Title	Lyrics	Music	Length
13.	"Utopia" (featuring Chris Jones)	den Adel; Gibson	den Adel; Gibson	3:56
Total length:				57:35

iTunes Store special edition bonus tracks
No.	Title	Lyrics	Music	Length
13.	"I Don't Wanna"	den Adel; Westerholt; Gibson	Westerholt; Gibson	5:03
14.	"The Last Dance"	den Adel; Westerholt; Spierenburg	den Adel; Westerholt; Spierenburg	4:26
15.	"Empty Eyes"	Westerholt; Gibson	Westerholt; Gibson	3:42
Total length:				66:52

Japanese edition bonus tracks
No.	Title	Lyrics	Music	Length
13.	"I Don't Wanna"	den Adel; Westerholt; Gibson	Westerholt; Gibson	5:03
14.	"Empty Eyes"	Westerholt; Gibson	Westerholt; Gibson	3:42
Total length:				62:26

2022 CD bonus tracks
No.	Title	Lyrics	Music	Length
13.	"The Last Dance"	den Adel; Westerholt; Spierenburg	den Adel; Westerholt; Spierenburg	4:26
14.	"I Don't Wanna"	den Adel; Westerholt; Gibson	Westerholt; Gibson	5:03
15.	"Empty Eyes"	Westerholt; Gibson	Westerholt; Gibson	3:42
Total length:				66:52

Special edition DVD
No.	Title	Length
1.	"Mother Maiden" (Short film)	3:22
2.	"Faster" (Music video)	4:23
3.	"Sinéad" (Short film)	4:32
4.	"Sinéad" (Music video)	4:24
5.	"Triplets" (Short film)	5:19
6.	"Shot in the Dark" (Music video)	5:05
7.	"The Making of "The Unforgiving""	20:56
8.	"Where Is the Edge" (Promo video)	4:56
9.	"Utopia" (Music video)	3:50
10.	"The Unforgiving: The Prequel Comic"	1:25
11.	"Credits"	0:53
12.	"Facebook Names"	12:06
Total length:		69:11

Notes

- Lyrics and music credits adapted from booklet liner notes.
- The special edition DVD includes a poster of the album cover and features names of those who promoted the "Where is the Edge" video on their Facebook page.

== Personnel ==
Within Temptation

- Sharon den Adel – vocals, songwriting
- Robert Westerholt – rhythm guitar
- Ruud Jolie – lead guitar
- Jeroen van Veen – bass
- Martijn Spierenburg – keyboards

Additional musicians

- Nicka Hellenberg – drums
- Stefan Helleblad – additional guitars
- Dawn Mastin – spoken words on tracks 1 and 6
- Franck van der Heijden – choir and orchestral arrangements

== Charts ==
=== Weekly charts ===
Chart (2011–12)	Peak position
Australian Albums (ARIA)	27
Austrian Albums (Ö3 Austria)	7
Belgian Albums (Ultratop Flanders)	3
Belgian Albums (Ultratop Wallonia)	14
Canadian Albums (Billboard)	40
Czech Albums (ČNS IFPI)	4
Danish Albums (Hitlisten)	34
Dutch Albums (Album Top 100)	2
Finnish Albums (Suomen virallinen lista)	3
French Albums (SNEP)	19
German Albums (Offizielle Top 100)	7
Greek Albums (IFPI)	12
Hungarian Albums (MAHASZ)	39
Irish Albums (IRMA)	87
Italian Albums (FIMI)	57
Japanese Albums (Oricon)	36
Mexican Albums (Top 100 Mexico)	66
Norwegian Albums (VG-lista)	25
Polish Albums (ZPAV)	6
Portuguese Albums (AFP)	3
Spanish Albums (Promusicae)	16
Scottish Albums (Official Charts)	26
Swedish Albums (Sverigetopplistan)	7
Swiss Albums (Schweizer Hitparade)	9
UK Albums (Official Charts)	23
UK Rock & Metal Albums (Official Charts)	1
US Billboard 200	50
US Top Rock Albums (Billboard)	14
US Top Hard Rock Albums (Billboard)	6

=== Year-end charts ===
Chart (2011)	Position
Belgian Albums (Ultratop Flanders)	40
Dutch Albums (MegaCharts)	27
German Albums (Offizielle Top 100)	98

== Certifications ==
Region	Certification	Certified units/sales
Germany (BVMI)	Gold	100,000^{‡}
Poland (ZPAV)	Gold	10,000^{*}
Portugal (AFP)	Platinum	20,000^{^}
United Kingdom (BPI)	Silver	60,000^{‡}
^{*} Sales figures based on certification alone.^{^} Shipments figures based on certification alone.^{‡} Sales+streaming figures based on certification alone.
