= Faster (Within Temptation song) =

Single by Within Temptation

from the album The Unforgiving
- B-side: "Where is the Edge"
- Released: 21 January 2011
- Genre: Hard rock
- Length: 4:24 (album version); 3:16 (radio edit)
- Label: Roadrunner
- Songwriters: Sharon den Adel; Robert Westerholt; Daniel Gibson
- Producers: Daniel Gibson; Stefan Helleblad; Within Temptation

Within Temptation singles chronology
"Utopia" (2009)	"Faster" (2011)	"Sinėad" (2011)

Music video
- "Faster (Music Video) & Mother Maiden Short Film" on YouTube

"Faster" is a song by Dutch symphonic metal band Within Temptation. It was released as the first single from their fifth studio album The Unforgiving on 21 January 2011. It had its worldwide radio première on 96.3 Rock Radio on the same day. The song was produced by their longtime producer Daniel Gibson, with Stefan Helleblad and Within Temptation serving as additional producers.

The song is part of the transmedia storytelling project the band undertook with The Unforgiving. It accompanied a music video released on 31 January 2011 and the short film Mother Maiden, released alongside the official music video.

The single achieved commercial success in the band's homecountry, the Netherlands, and moderate commercial success across Europe. It peaked at number 11 in the Dutch Top 100., entered single charts in Belgium, Germany, Finland, and Portugal, and rock single charts in Czech Republic and in the United Kingdom. It has been featured on the annual Dutch Top 2000 since 2015.

== Background ==
Robert Westerholt said:

"Faster" is a song which surprised ourselves. It's a very fresh new sound wrapped around the 80s heart and soul of the track. "Faster" reflects one of the many musical roots we have. Combined with the modern influences on our new album, it's like the past and future created the present.

Sharon den Adel said in an interview with Metal Ways:

Actually, "Faster" sounds a bit like "Wicked Game"s... Yes, it has the same atmosphere. It has similar, almost the same, accords, but it is different... So, we've been going like: "Ooooh we have re-written Wicked Games" and then "No, the chords scheme is different, we don't have to worry. And it's a written song!" (laughs) "Yay!"

Den Adel's explanation of the song's lyrics in an interview with Songfacts:

"Faster" is about the fact that you have to stay in conflict to get what you want as an individual in life. When you're working with a company or in a relationship, when you're working with other people, you've got to set some boundaries for yourself which you won't cross because ethically it's not okay to go over that boundary for yourself. Because that's what you stand for, that's who you are, those are your values. That's what the song is about: you can't live with lies. You just have to be who you are and what you stand for. And sometimes you're frustrated about it and you just want to fast forward away from the problem, but you also have to deal with the thing that's happening at that time in your life.

== Videos ==
=== Mother Maiden short film ===
The Unforgiving's first short film, Mother Maiden, was combined with the music video to "Faster" and released on 31 January 2011. The film begins with the character of Mother Maiden (played by Dawn Mastin) writing a letter and reciting a monologue which explains that she controls lost souls to seek revenge on "those with a dark heart." While Mother Maiden continues to speak, the film cuts between her and the "lost souls" which she controls. Firstly, we see the character of Sinéad dragging an unconscious man on top of a train, who awakens just before being killed by a low hanging rail road signal. We then cut to "The Triplets" (more of Mother Maiden's workers) crawling into a window, after which an unseen woman screams and the Triplets reappear with their mouths smeared with blood. Finally, we are shown a man shaving before an arm bursts from his bathroom mirror and strangles him. At this point, the "Faster" music video begins with the band playing the song in full. As it ends, we see Sinéad's corpse awakening in a morgue. The script was written by Steven O'Connell and Tim Smit. The music video and short movie were directed by Joeri Holsheimer.

== Personnel ==
=== Cast ===
- Dawn Mastin as Mother Maiden
- Nicola Hemink as Sinéad
- Key Graham as Sinéad's Father
- Christopher Van Dujin as Triplets
- Matthijx Kat as Man on train
- Banny Bakker as Shaving Man

=== Alternate music video ===
At the same time as the release of the full "Faster" music video and Mother Maiden short film, an edited version of the song was released on YouTube with the same footage inter-cut (rather than as originally presented in their separate components of the three short-films –Mother Maiden, Sinéad and Triplets).

== Track ==
Digital download
No.	Title	Lyrics	Music	Length
1.	"Faster" (radio edit)	Sharon den Adel; Robert Westerholt; Daniel Gibson	den Adel; Westerholt; Gibson	3:16
2.	"Faster" (international radio edit)	den Adel; Westerholt; Gibson	den Adel; Westerholt; Gibson	3:15
Total length:				6:31

CD single
No.	Title	Lyrics	Music	Length
1.	"Faster" (album version)	den Adel; Westerholt; Gibson	den Adel; Westerholt; Gibson	4:24
2.	"Where is the Edge"	den Adel; Westerholt; Gibson	den Adel; Westerholt; Gibson	3:59
Total length:				8:23

== Charts ==
=== Weekly charts ===
Chart (2011)	Peak position
Belgium (Ultratop 50 Flanders)	32
Belgium (Ultratip Bubbling Under Flanders)	9
Czech Republic (Modern Rock)	2
Finland Download (Latauslista)	24
Germany (GfK)	48
Netherlands (Dutch Top 40)	19
Netherlands (Single Top 100)	11
Portuguese Singles Chart	23
UK Rock (Official Charts Company)	6

=== Year-end charts ===
Chart (2011)	Position
Netherlands (Dutch Top 40)	128
