= Within Temptation =

Dutch symphonic metal band

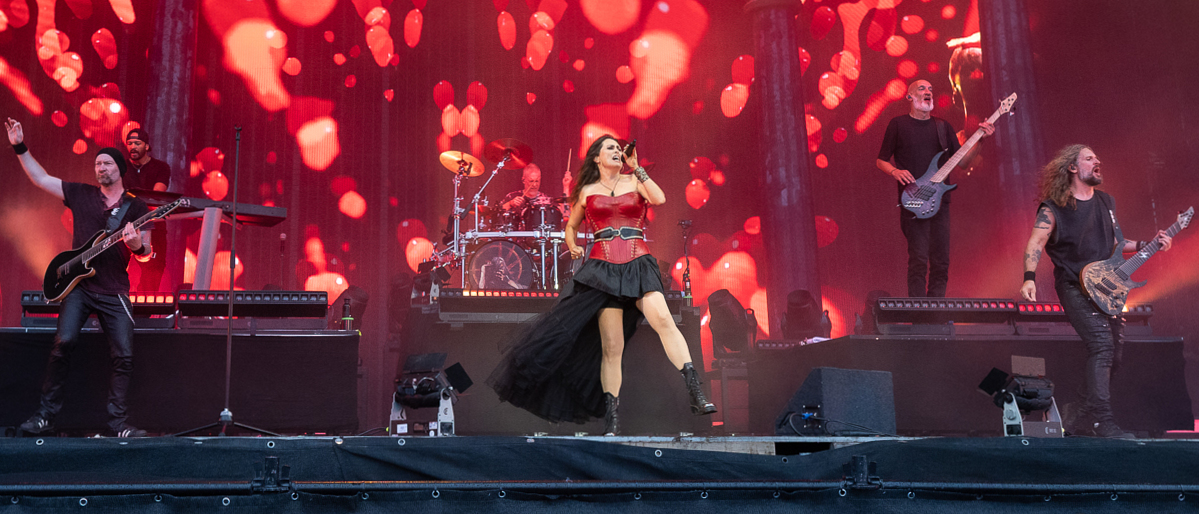
- Within Temptation at Wacken Open Air 2025

Background information
- Also known as: The Portal
- Origin: Waddinxveen, South Holland, Netherlands
- Genres: Symphonic metal; alternative metal; gothic metal; doom metal (early)
- Works: Discography; videography
- Years active: 1996–present
- Labels: DSFA; UMG; BMG; Nuclear Blast; Vertigo; Roadrunner; GUN; Within Temptation Entertainment BV
- Members: Sharon den Adel; Robert Westerholt (studio only); Jeroen van Veen; Ruud Jolie; Mike Coolen; Stefan Helleblad; Vikram Shankar
- Past members: Michiel Papenhove; Martijn Westerholt; Dennis Leeflang; Richard Willemse; Ivar de Graaf; Marius van Pyreen; Ciro Palma; Jelle Bakker; Stephen van Haestregt; Martijn Spierenburg
- Website: within-temptation.com

Within Temptation is a Dutch symphonic metal band founded in April 1996 by vocalist Sharon den Adel and guitarist Robert Westerholt. They have also been classified under other genres, with critics praising the band's experimentation and musical versatility. By 2016, the band had sold more than 3.5 million albums worldwide.

After the release of their debut album, Enter (1997), which was still rooted in gothic metal, Within Temptation became prominent in the Dutch underground scene. It was not until 2001 that they became known to the general public, with the single "Ice Queen" from their second album, Mother Earth, which reached No. 2 on the Dutch charts. This was followed by the band winning the Conamus Exportprijs, a Dutch music award, four years in a row, and a fifth in 2016. Within Temptation's next albums, The Silent Force (2004) and The Heart of Everything (2007), debuted at No. 1 on the Dutch charts and expanded their international recognition. In 2008, they released Black Symphony, a live album recorded with the Metropole Orchestra. This was followed in 2009 by An Acoustic Night at the Theatre, another live album, this time with acoustic renditions of the songs.

The band's fifth studio album, The Unforgiving, was released in 2011 and was one part of a transmedia effort, alongside both a comic book series and a series of short films that together encompass a story. The album saw the band increasingly venturing on new musical territories outside symphonic metal. The group advanced the exploration of other musical genres in their subsequent releases. Their sixth studio album, Hydra, was released in early 2014 and featured a wide range of guest appearances from other artists. Their seventh studio album, Resist, was released in 2019 and incorporated influences from styles such as industrial and EDM. Bleed Out, their latest studio effort, was released in 2023 and contains influences from metalcore and djent, alongside hints from their initial gothic metal inclinations.

== History ==
=== Formation ===
Long-term partners Robert Westerholt (guitar) and Sharon den Adel (vocals) began the band in 1996, after Westerholt left his previous band, The Circle. The Circle renamed themselves Voyage and released an album called Embrace, including a song featuring den Adel. Soon after that release, the band broke up.

Westerholt then joined with den Adel in forming a doom metal band called The Portal, including former The Circle band members Jeroen van Veen on bass guitar and Michiel Papenhove on guitar, as well as Martijn Westerholt on the keyboard and Dennis Leeflang on drums (later replaced by Ivar de Graaf). However, they renamed themselves Within Temptation, before they recorded their demo, Enter. The Enter demo contained some songs that would later be released on their first album. They were offered a recording contract and signed to DSFA Records later that year, beginning work on their first album.

=== Enter and first national tour (1997–1999) ===
Enter, the debut album, was released in 1997. The album was well received and the band embarked on a four-gig tour across the country, after which they performed at the Dynamo Open Air festival in Eindhoven. The band rounded out 1997 by embarking on their first international tour of Germany and Austria. Also, subsequently Ivar de Graaf left the band and was replaced by Ciro Palma.

The sound of Enter, whilst melodic, was doomily paced, and influenced by gothic doom metal, heavily reliant on slow keyboards and drums and repetitive guitar riffs. Also prominent on this album are death grunts by Robert Westerholt and George Oosthoek, ex-member of Orphanage.

In 1998 the band continued to tour – their profile had elevated them to the main stage at Dynamo for the 1998 event. However, Within Temptation had released no new material (and did not have plans for a second album at this point), to which end they elected to release an EP, The Dance, with three songs (plus two remixes) that would further mature the sound from Enter.

The band was largely on sabbatical for 1999. They took the opportunity to construct their own studio, as well as returning to personal pursuits, with plans to return to the fold the next year.

=== Mother Earth and national breakthrough (2000–2003) ===
2000 was an eventful year for the band as they returned to touring, playing three Dutch festivals: Waterpop, Bospop and Lowlands. In addition, they went to work on their second album, releasing Mother Earth in the Low Countries on 1 December. The album was a moderate success in the Dutch charts the first few weeks after its release.

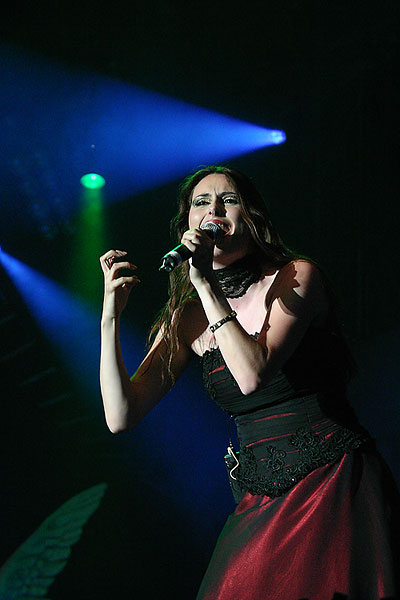
Lead vocalist Sharon den Adel at the 2004 M'era Luna Festival.

Within Temptation's "Mother Earth" (2000)
Rapid orchestral strings move to the forefront on the chorus of this title track from Within Temptation's second album, Mother Earth.

The band released the single "Our Farewell", which never entered the charts. The second single from Mother Earth, "Ice Queen", was regarded as the breakthrough release for the band; in March 2002 it climbed to No. 2 in the Netherlands but was their first No. 1 single when it climbed to the top in Belgium. The success rebounded to Mother Earth, which continued to climb in the Dutch album chart, ending the year at No. 3.

2001 saw a number of changes in personnel; Ruud Jolie was added as a second guitarist, drummer Ivar de Graaf was replaced by Stephen van Haestregt, and Martijn Westerholt (suffering from infectious mononucleosis) was replaced by Martijn Spierenburg. Westerholt later started the band Delain.

In 2002 they had their first concert in France and a headline gig in Mexico City. They attained their first major award, the Dutch Silver Harp. They bolstered this by embarking on a major international tour supporting Paradise Lost in 2003 and re-releasing Mother Earth on the GUN Records label across more European countries; it was a success in Germany, where it went platinum and reached No. 7 in the charts. The re-release of "Ice Queen" also charted well in the top 30. In turn the Benelux regions got a different release, a cover of Kate Bush's "Running Up That Hill". The band headlined music festivals across the Netherlands, while their Mother Earth tour DVD claimed the prestigious Edison Award. Promotion of Mother Earth in newer markets continued well into 2004 with various international festival appearances (such as M'era Luna, Rock Werchter, and Pukkelpop) and other headline gigs, which also saw the band make their UK live debut in London in September of that year.

=== The Silent Force and further recognition (2004–2006) ===
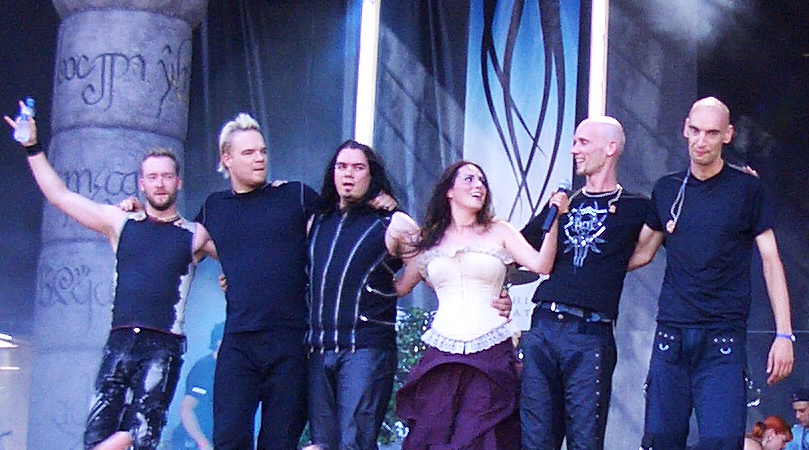
The band presented at several big European festivals, which led the band to perform to great major audiences.

Plans for the band's third album came to fruition in 2004, with the release of The Silent Force on 15 November 2004, across Europe. It was produced by Daniel Gibson and an instant No. 1 in the Netherlands and charted well in many European countries. In support of the release they embarked on another large international tour in 2005, with dates across Europe (including their first festival appearance in the United Kingdom headlining the Bloodstock festival) and a one-off show in Dubai. As of early 2005, the album had already sold more than 400.000 copies only in Europe. "Stand My Ground" and "Memories", the first singles from the new album, continued the band's run of chart success, culminating in a second Edison Award. The third single was "Angels". "Stand My Ground" was later to be promoted on the trailer for the film Blood and Chocolate. The band also provided some of the soundtrack to the video game Knights of the Temple: Infernal Crusade released in March.

In January 2006, Within Temptation won the Dutch Pop Prize (best Dutch contribution) and Dutch Export Prize (best-selling Dutch artist outside the Netherlands), the latter one given to them for the third time in a row. The band also reported that they were busy working on their next album, due to be released during the fall and that they would start playing at festivals starting in April, in addition to going on an international tour at the end of the year. Although already successful in Europe, it was not until 5 August 2008 that both Mother Earth and The Silent Force albums were released in the North American market for the first time, through Roadrunner Records.

=== The Heart of Everything, international recognition and first world tour (2007–2008) ===
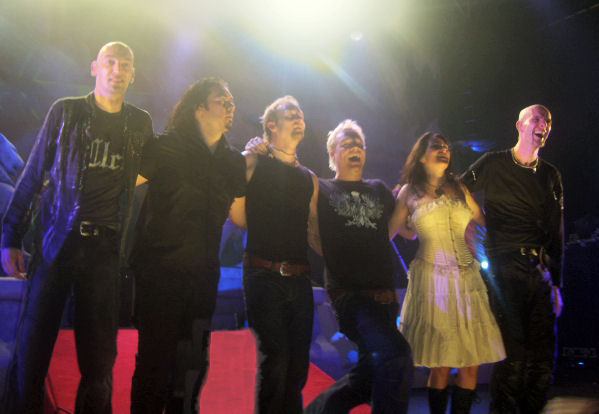
The band's longest line-up, as pictured in 2007: Jeroen van Veen, Stephen van Haestregt, Ruud Jolie, Martijn Spierenburg, Sharon den Adel, Robert Westerholt.

The album The Heart of Everything from Within Temptation was released on 9 March 2007, in the Netherlands, and in the United States on 24 July. Two tracks, called "The Howling" and "Sounds of Freedom", were recorded as promotional material for the video game The Chronicles of Spellborn, and the first of these opens the album. The full track listing was revealed on 10 January. The album debuted at No. 1 in the Dutch Album 100, making it their second number-one album. It reached No. 2 in Belgium, No. 2 in Finland, the top 10 in eight countries and top 100 in eleven countries.

The song "What Have You Done" was the first single released from the album. Its initial music video was recorded on the 12, 13 and 14 December 2006 at the Koko club in London, and a CGI studio in Windsor. It features Keith Caputo of Life of Agony on guest vocals. Fans were allowed to participate in the making of the video, although this first version left the band feeling disappointed (comments made by the band at their March show in Lyon). Shortly after, a completely new video for the song was made. The second single, released across Europe in June, was "Frozen". The video, filmed in Romania, deals with child abuse, and sales of the single was to raise money for a children's charity, Child Helpline International. "The Howling" was chosen as a digital single release for the UK (not to be confused with the US EP release), and another video was also shot. The extended version of the "Frozen" single features an unreleased b-side, "Sounds of Freedom", as mentioned the second song written for the promotion of the computer game The Chronicles of Spellborn. Roadrunner Records also released an Enhanced CD limited edition EP called The Howling, which was available only at Hot Topic stores in the United States, containing the title track plus popular tracks from their former album The Silent Force and music video of the US edit of the song "What Have You Done".

Within Temptation started their very first United States tour a few months after the European release of The Heart of Everything, supporting Lacuna Coil, and appearing alongside In This Moment, Stolen Babies, The Gathering, and Kylesa. The tour, dubbed The Hottest Chicks in Metal Tour 2007, was largely a success. The Heart of Everything was then released there on 24 July, and the promotional single of "What Have You Done" shipped to rock stations on 2 of July. This was the band's first album to be released in America followed by the previous albums Mother Earth and The Silent Force a year later.

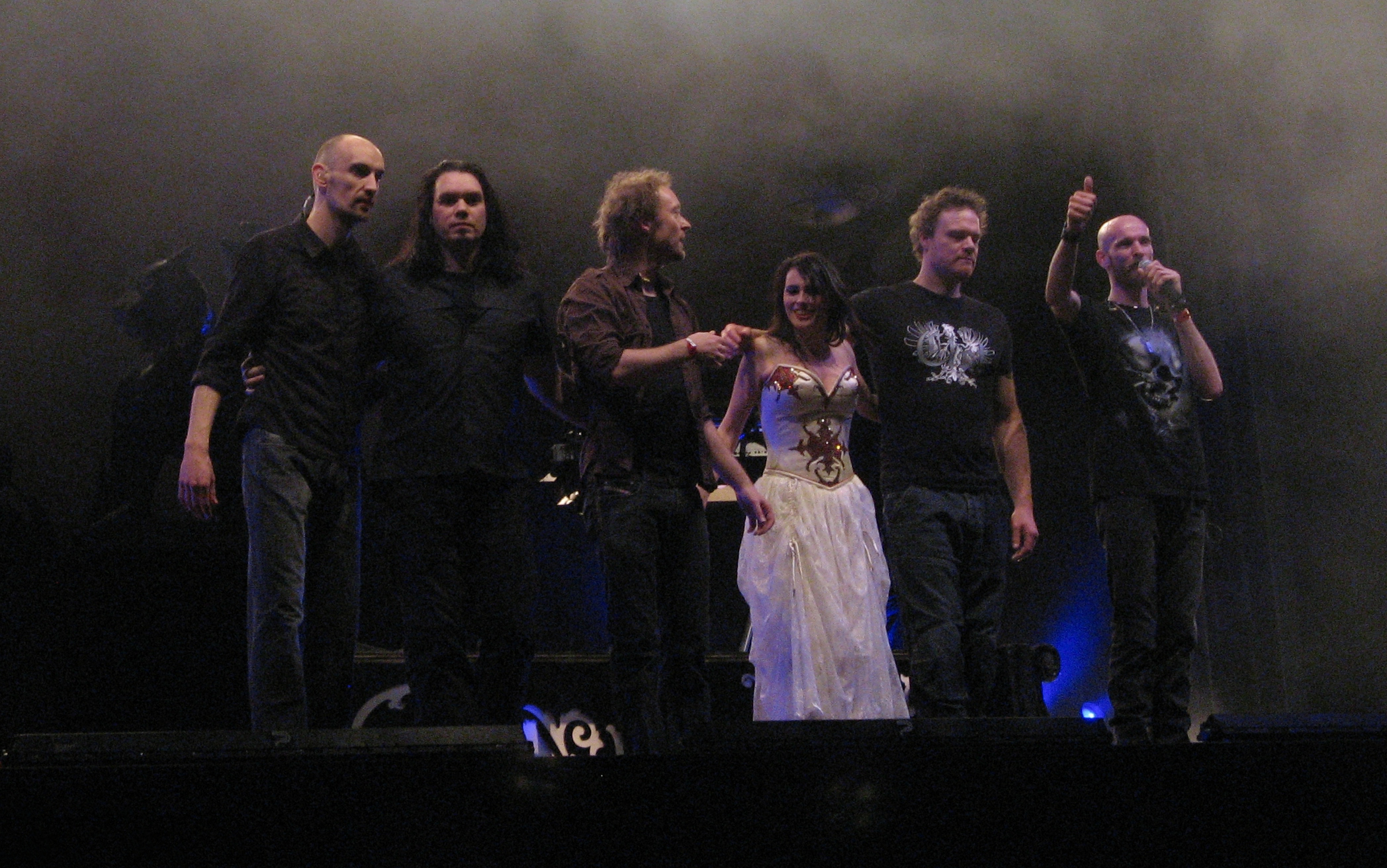
Within Temptation at the 2008 edition of the Bevrijdingsfestival, in Groningen, Netherlands.

In support of the new album, Within Temptation kicked off their first headlining US tour in Fall 2007. The band played 13 shows, starting on 5 September 2007, in Boston and ended on 23 September 2007, in Tempe, Arizona.

On 19 October 2007, Within Temptation released the video for their third single, "All I Need". The single was released in Europe around 12 November and features the single and album versions of the title track plus demo versions of "The Last Time" (a previously unreleased track), "Frozen" and "Our Solemn Hour".

In November 2007, the band released a statement that their concert at Beursgebouw, in Eindhoven, was filmed for possible inclusion on a new concert DVD (either parts or all of the show). On 7 February 2008, the band performed a 10,000 audience show entitled Black Symphony at the Ahoy in Nederlands together with The Metropole Orchestra, a choir and several guest artists, and it was later revealed that this show would be filmed in its entirety for DVD and Blu-ray together with a double CD, which was to be released on 22 September 2008 (international) and 23 September 2008 (in the US). The trailer for the DVD (containing the entire live performance of the song "Our Solemn Hour" from the show) was released on the band's Opendisc feature on 16 July 2008. Another single from The Heart of Everything, Forgiven, was released to promote the Black Symphony release. Later, Black Symphony was certified Gold in the Netherlands.

=== An Acoustic Night at the Theatre (2009–2010) ===
On 3 November 2008, Ruud Jolie stated on his blog, "After the Theater Tour, that will start next week, me and the rest of Within Temptation are gonna take a whole year off. For the last 7 years, we've been hopping from studio to tour bus to airplane to boat to studio again to tour bus to bicycle to airplane to an occasional swimming pool on the top of a hotel to tour bus again. We all really needed a break from the band..." From that tour, On 11 August 2009, on their official website, Sharon announced that an acoustic album would be released in late October/early November called An Acoustic Night at the Theatre. It would include several acoustic songs from their tour in November 2008. On 30 October the album was released, the single was released with the album called "Utopia". The song is a duet between Sharon and Chris Jones and was released on 23 October.

Their song "What Have You Done" is on the video game Guitar Hero World Tour and was present on a TV promo of a Grey's Anatomy episode, "The Truth Beneath The Rose" was featured in the commercials for The Tudors, season 3, on Showtime. The song "All I Need" was featured in the American television show The Vampire Diaries.

=== The Unforgiving and second world tour (2011–2012) ===
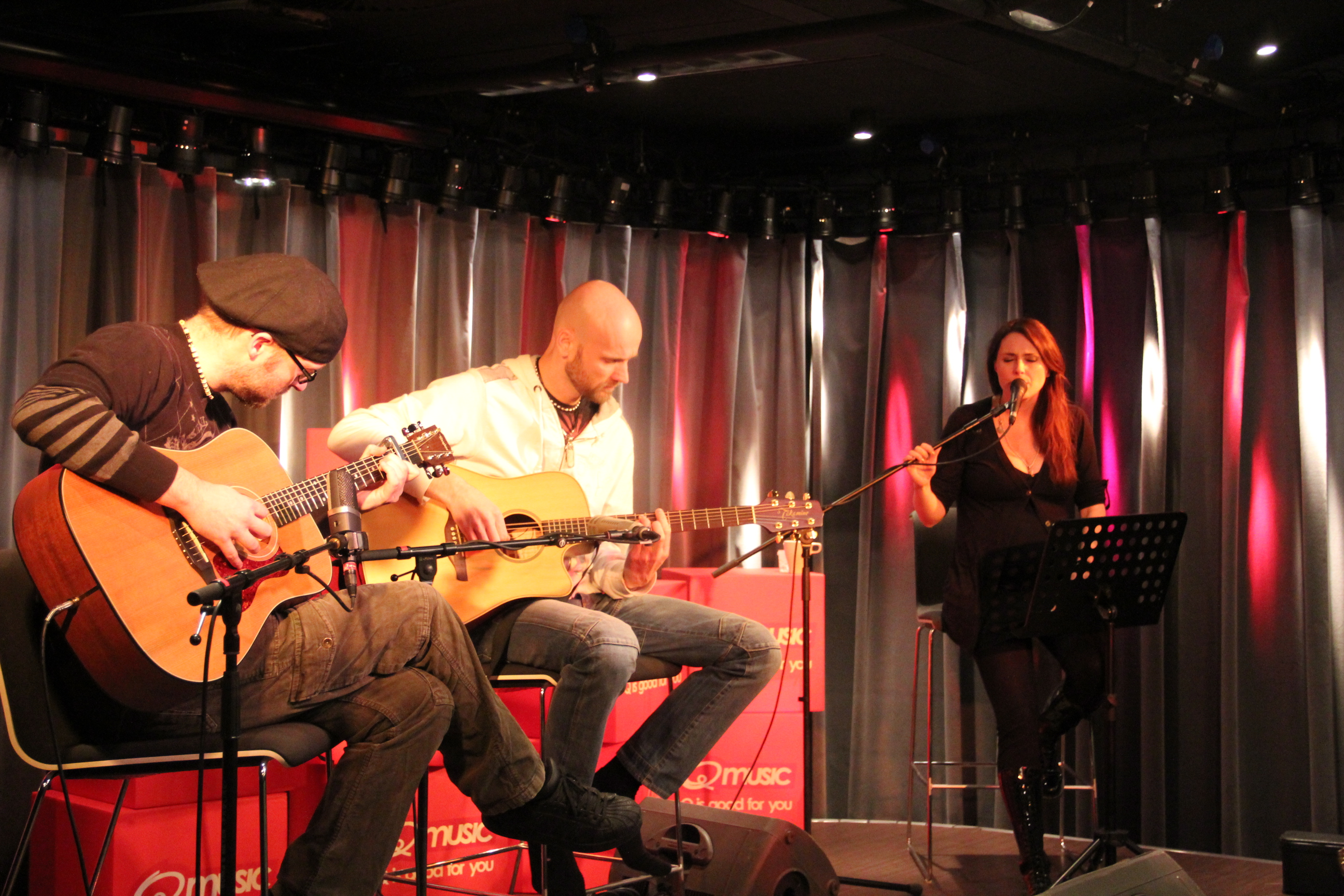
Members of Within Temptation doing an acoustic performance at the Q-Music studios

In November 2008, the band announced that they would begin working on their new studio album in 2009, and that the Heart Of Everything Tour was drawing to an end. On 1 June 2009, it was announced that Sharon had given birth to a boy, her second child with Robert Westerholt. In 2010, the band embarked on a second Theatre Tour, their last with drummer Stephen Van Haestregt.

In the meantime, the band continued work on their new studio album. In an interview with Metal Ways at Appelpop 2008, guitarist Robert Westerholt stated that the new album was "probably going to be kind of a concept, but it's so early still that nothing is really sure yet. But we're trying to look in that direction."

On 18 November 2010, the band announced via their website that their new album, entitled The Unforgiving, was released on 25 March 2011. The concept of the album would be based on a comic book series, written by Steven O’Connell (BloodRayne & Dark 48), and illustrated by Romano Molenaar (Witchblade, Darkness and X-Men). Each song on The Unforgiving was written along Steven's narrative, with characters in the songs reflecting the protagonists of the comic. On 26 July 2010, the band announced that they would be embarking on a European tour at the beginning of 2011 in support of their new release. However, on 26 November 2010, it was announced that due to Sharon's third pregnancy, the tour dates would be moved from early 2011 to fall 2011.

On the official website, den Adel shared that they have recorded three music videos for the album within the course of a week. "Where Is The Edge", a promotional video, was released on 15 December 2010 featuring scenes from the Dutch movie Me & Mr Jones. The first new single, "Faster," was released 21 January and the video for the song was released 31 January 2011. The track was played in heavy rotation (at least once in each show) on UK classic rock station Planet Rock.

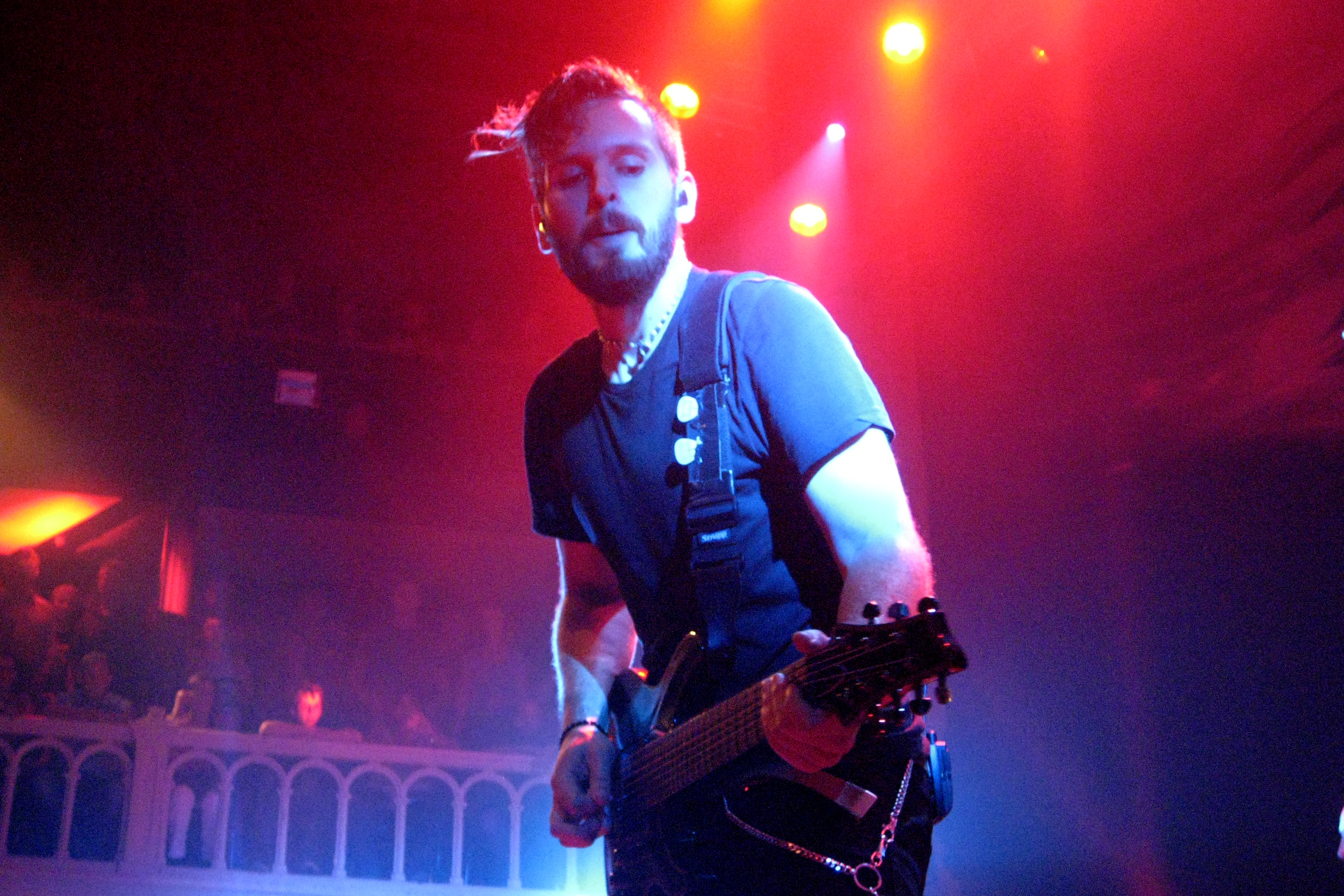
Stefan Helleblad (pictured) took Robert Westerholt's place during Within Temptation tours (starting from The Unforgiving Tour to date), enabling Westerholt to raise his and den Adel's children at home.

On 22 February 2011, the band announced that Mike Coolen had joined as full-time drummer. However, the studio album had been recorded with Swedish drummer Nicka Hellenberg.

On 14 March 2011, Sony BMG organized an online-listening session of the upcoming album on a Polish website that only people from Poland could access. However, every song was soon after leaked onto the Internet. Within Temptation tried to prevent the leak before the release date. Limited promotional CDs were sent strictly to journalists who had to come to a listening session. Later that month, the second short film entitled "Sinéad" was released without an accompanying music video. However, it is available on the special edition CD/DVD set of The Unforgiving along with the remaining short film "Triplets" and music video for "Shot in the Dark". During the album promotional phases, the birth of Logan was reported on the Within Temptation website.

The album debuted at No. 2 in the Netherlands, while the two previous albums, The Heart of Everything and The Silent Force, debuted at No. 1. The Unforgiving also debuted in the Top 10 of Belgium, Portugal, Finland, Germany, Sweden, Switzerland and Austria. The single "Faster" did not chart as well as other Within Temptation singles like "Stand My Ground" and "Ice Queen", though in the digital music store iTunes the song placed on the common charts, entering the Top 5 in the Netherlands (#4), while the single reached No. 11 so far. On the digital Rock Charts, "Faster" became a hit, reaching the No. 1 in the Netherlands, Belgium, Finland, Spain, No. 2 on Sweden, No. 5 in Germany, No. 6 in Austria, No. 8 in France, No. 10 in Luxembourg, No. 11 in Denmark, No. 13 in the US and No. 18 in Mexico. Following that, the band announced that the new single would be "Sinéad." Later, the band was awarded "Best Other Media Music" for its album The Unforgiving on the new solenity "Buma Music in Motion", that awards creative and innovative methods to make music.

On 10 June 2011, the music video of "Sinéad" was officially released to promote the same single, that had its physical release on 15 July. The single was a little different from the others, including three remixes of the music made by three different DJs.

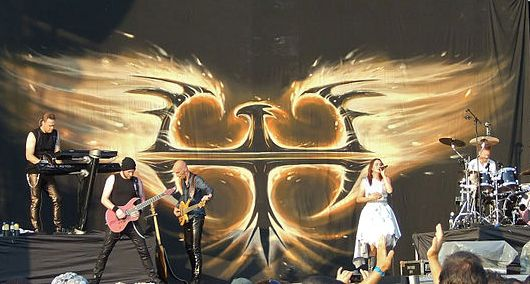
Within Temptation in 2012 performing at the Sofia Rocks Festival, Bulgaria.

Proceeding on promotion of the album, the band presented at the Sziget Festival, but The Unforgiving Tour officially started 12 August, at the Huntenpop Festival, where the band played the whole The Unforgiving album among other albums hits, in a special show as "The First Challenge". During August, the band performed at several Summer Festivals as M'era Luna and Lowlands and started an indoor tour in September, first in the North America and then crossing Europe. In early September, the album reached Gold status in Poland. Later that month, it was announced that Robert would step down touring with the band (except for occasional shows) as there was no-one to look after Robert and Sharon's three children. Robert will focus on production and songwriting, while Stefan Helleblad is taking his place on stage.

In early 2012, to continue promoting the album, the band started a South American tour, passing through Brazil, Chile, Argentina, Peru and Ecuador. Right after coming back to Europe, the band presented a semi-acoustic Dutch theater tour in March 2012, called Sanctuary, much like their previous live album An Acoustic Night at the Theatre, in which they played many songs never played before, like "Say My Name", "The Last Dance", "Overcome", "Bittersweet" and some that they don't play often, like "Restless", "Sounds Of Freedom", "The Swan Song" and "Our Farewell". Most of them were played in acoustic version. On 8 May 2012 Sharon den Adel and Ruud Jolie appeared on DWDD Recordings to perform an acoustic cover of Nirvana's song "Smells Like Teen Spirit". The band embarked on a second leg of festivals, headlining several of the biggest European 2012 Summer Festivals, such as Sonisphere, Masters of Rock, Rock Werchter, Summerbreeze and Gods of Metal. Later, the band officially announced a very special show called Elements. The sold-out special show celebrated the band's 15-year anniversary at the Sportpaleis, Belgium, and the band was accompanied by the Il Novecentro Orchestra and other special guests, such as band's ex-members.

=== Hydra and various influences (2013–2016) ===
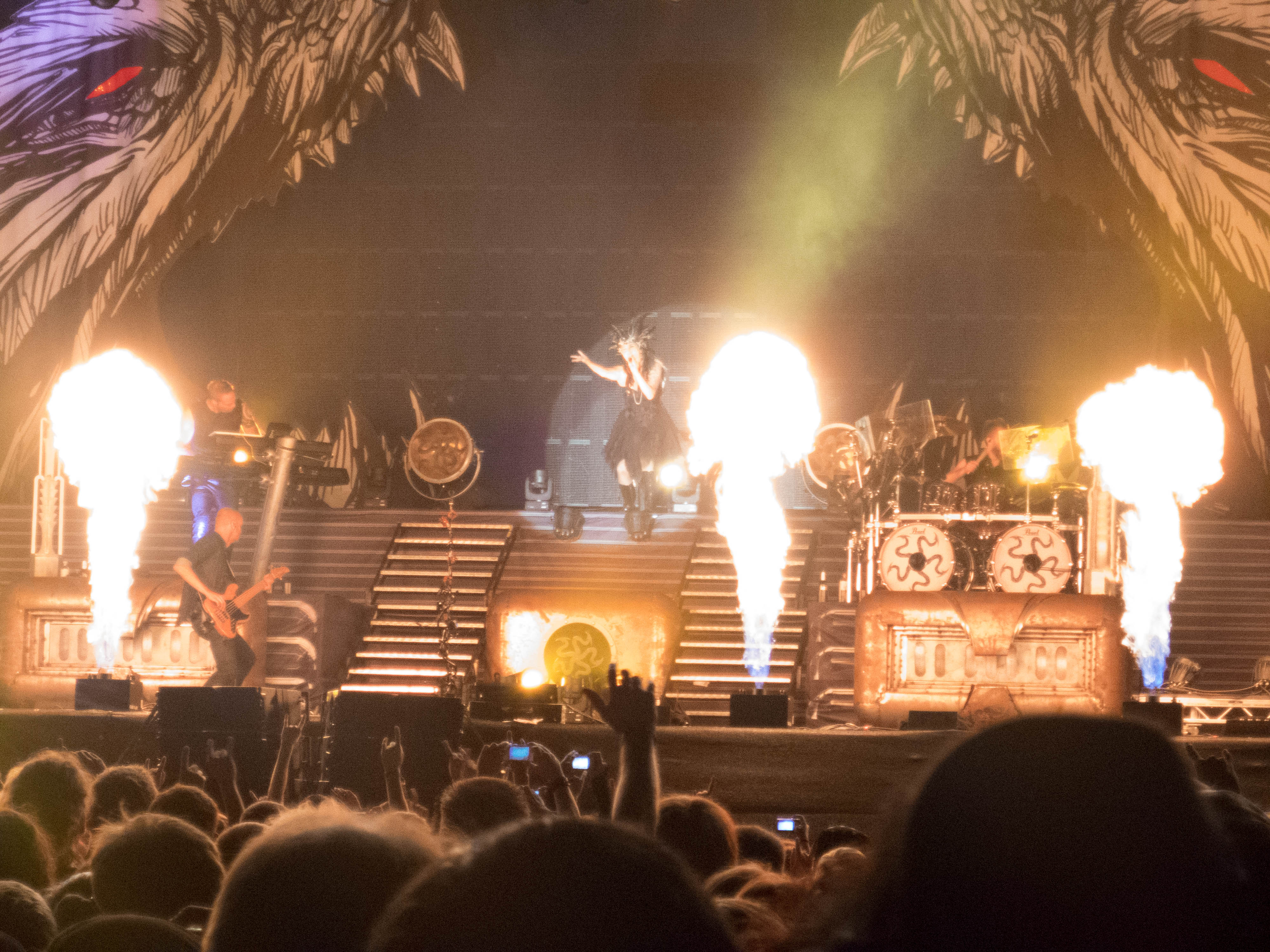
The band performing at the 2014 edition of the M'era Luna Festival with a Hydra-themed stage.

In the run up to the 15th anniversary of Within Temptation, the band was asked by Belgian radio station Q-Music to choose and perform an existing track in a "Within Temptation style" once a week during fifteen weeks during their special program Within Temptation Friday. The covers were mostly pop songs, which the band transformed into a more symphonic form. Lead vocalist Sharon den Adel stated that “Our approach was to really make the cover a new Within Temptation song. So not going the easy way by using only a piano or an acoustic guitar for example, but really trying to put all the elements of a Within Temptation track in this new version. It was quite a challenge because we had only one week to get it right, while recording an original Within Temptation song can sometimes takes up half a year! But this pressure also gave us an [sic] creative boost and it was very rewarding to get it done in time each week. Also, we learned a lot from the in-depth analysis we needed to make on these hits, written by others, in combination with implementing our own sound and style in each new cover. We are glad that we’ve taken up this challenge and are very proud of the result." They covered artists such as Imagine Dragons, OneRepublic, Lana Del Rey, and The Who, among others. On 19 April 2013, 11 of the 15 covers made by the band were released in a cover album entitled The Q-Music Sessions. On the same day, the band released the official music video of their cover of "Titanium".

The writing process of the band's next studio album began in 2012, and at the first half of the year the band has six songs written already. The album was scheduled to be released worldwide in September, by their new label, BMG and in the Netherlands by Universal Music. On 16 June, the band went on to record the first music video for the new album. During a series of statements about the recording progress of the album, Westerholt stated that the album would contain growls. At the middle of May, bassist Jeroen van Veen went to the studio to record the bass base for the first five songs. On 12 July, the band released a teaser trailer of the upcoming studio album, but without any names revealed. On the next month, the band announced the title of the lead single, in which is "Paradise (What About Us?)", also uploading a teaser trailer revealing some lyrics and a guitar solo in anticipation for the release. The band eventually got a North American sign deal with Nuclear Blast and, about that partnership the company's president Monte Conner stated that "There are very few bands out there today who continually deliver on such a high and consistent level as Within Temptation. That is why they have such an incredibly loyal worldwide fan base. I am thrilled they chose Nuclear Blast Entertainment as their US partner. Their fans are in for a real treat come later this year!". The band also established a licensing deal with Dramatico for the United Kingdom release of the album. Once the drumming and vocal recording was complete, the final guitar recordings started on 26 August.

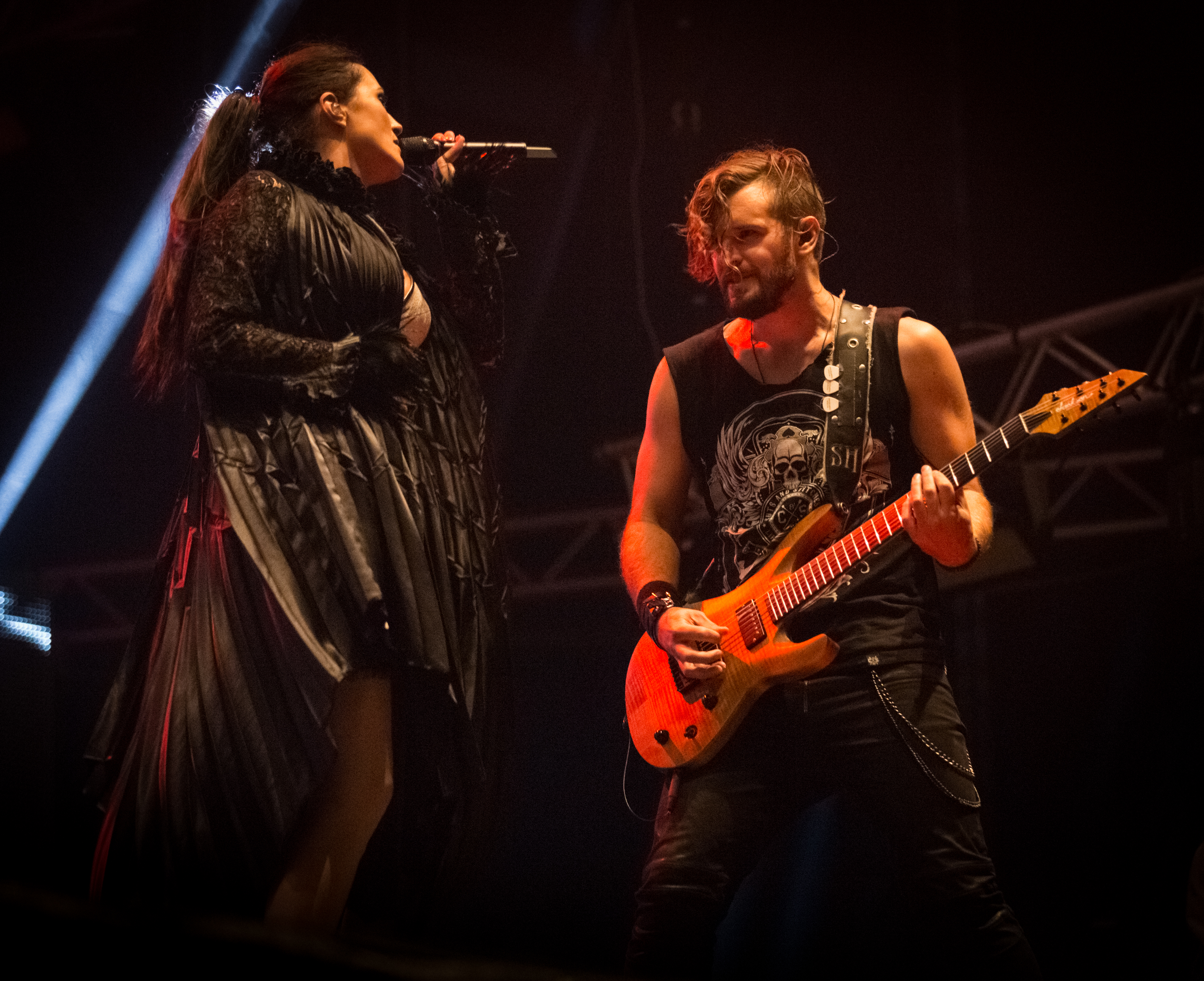
den Adel and Helleblad at the 2015 Wacken Open Air.

On 30 August, the band announced that the lead single "Paradise (What About Us?)" would be released as an EP, which is also set to feature three tracks from the upcoming album in their demo form: "Let Us Burn", "Silver Moonlight" and "Dog Days". Upon making this announcement, den Adel said: "By releasing these demos we want to invite you in our home studio and show how we capture song ideas at an early stage of creating a new album. These demo versions are far from their final sound on the album, but will give you a hint of what we're working on. It will be fascinating to hear how the result will sound like, once the album is released.". After announcing that the lead single would contain a guest musician, on 13 September the band officially announced that Tarja Turunen was set to appear as a special vocalist on the title song. The EP was released on 27 September. On 25 and 26 October, den Adel and Westerholt presented an unknown number of songs of the upcoming album to the press. The second promotional single, "Dangerous", was released on 20 December and features ex-Killswitch Engage singer Howard Jones. Hydra was finally released on 31 January 2014, in mainland Europe and on 4 February on North America and United Kingdom, and was met with critical and commercial success. In the Netherlands, Hydra marked the band's return to the first position on the charts since the release of The Heart of Everything in 2007, also reaching the first spot on the Czech Republic album charts, making it their first number-one album outside the Netherlands. The band had their first album on a top 10 position in the UK Albums Chart, debuting at six and the first top 20 position on the US Billboard 200, debuting at the number 16.

To promote the album, the band embarked on their Hydra World Tour, which was originally planned to start in January 2014, but was postponed so the band could polish the songs more before releasing the album and had a try-out show at the Effenaar, in Eindhoven, NL, which sold out on the same day it was put on sale. The first official show happened on 26 February, in Helsinki, Finland, and the arena tour passed primarily in Europe, covering a few summer festivals. Due to the great reception of Hydra in the United States, the band decided to tour again in North America, travelling from West to East coast and passing through twelve cities, two in Canada, and having some sold-out venues. On 2 May, the band announced through their Facebook page that they were going to record the concert at the Heineken Music Hall, Amsterdam, and most of the concert later appeared on the DVD Let Us Burn - Elements & Hydra Live in Concert together with some parts of the previous tour Elements 15th anniversary show. As the end of the European leg, the tour had an attendance of over 120.000 people.

=== Den Adel's solo project and Resist (2017–2019) ===
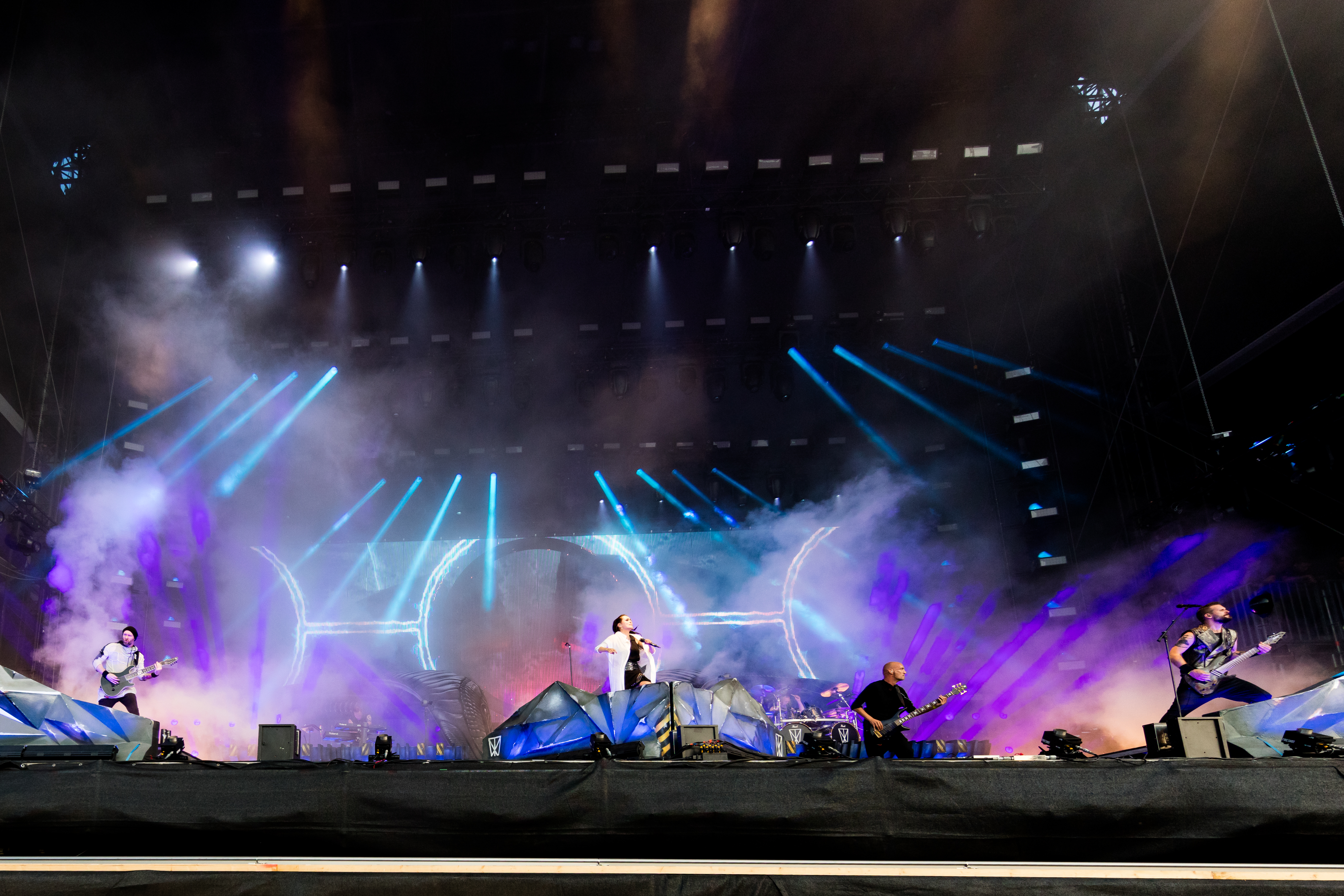
Within Temptation performing at Wacken Open Air in 2019.

On 3 November 2017, the band changed their website and social media to display only a message announcing that a statement from Sharon den Adel would be coming soon. A video statement appeared 7 days later, in which Sharon announced a new solo project entitled "My Indigo". The project came by a writer's block she had while starting to composing new songs for the band's next album, besides also dealing with personal problems, which led her to get some time apart from the band and compose for herself. Later, she decided to release these songs publicly via the aforementioned project. During this process, she regained inspiration to write again for the band, and songs for a new Within Temptation album are currently in the demo phase, with new material to be released in 2018.

At the end of November, the band announced a European tour for the end of the next year. At the beginning of December, almost a year before the tour, two concerts were already sold out. The tour commenced before the release of the album, and saw the band playing selected songs in order to promote it. By the end of 2018, it was reported by the Dutch media that the first European leg of the tour had an attendance of 125,000 people.

In July 2018, Within Temptation signed a new recording contract with Vertigo Records Germany, which was selected to release their seventh studio album worldwide, except in Japan. The first single from the album, titled "The Reckoning" and featuring Jacoby Shaddix, was released on 14 September of that year. The music video for the song marked the first time the band got nominated again for the Edison Award since 2005. The second single, titled "Raise Your Banner" and featuring Anders Fridén, was released on 16 November and the third, "Firelight", featuring Jasper Steverlinck, was released on 23 November. The album, titled Resist, was officially announced through Metal Hammer magazine by the end of 2018 and released on 1 February 2019. The fourth single, "In Vain", was released on 11 January 2019. A music video for "Supernova", a song off of the album, was released on 5 February 2019. A lyric video for "Mad World" was released on 15 April 2019.

After the album release, the band went back on The Resist Tour to perform fifteen concerts in North America and later on European summer festivals. During the 2019 festival season, the band was scheduled for the first time as one of the headliners for the Graspop Metal Meeting, one of the biggest European heavy metal festivals.

=== Worlds Collide tour and Bleed Out (2020–present) ===
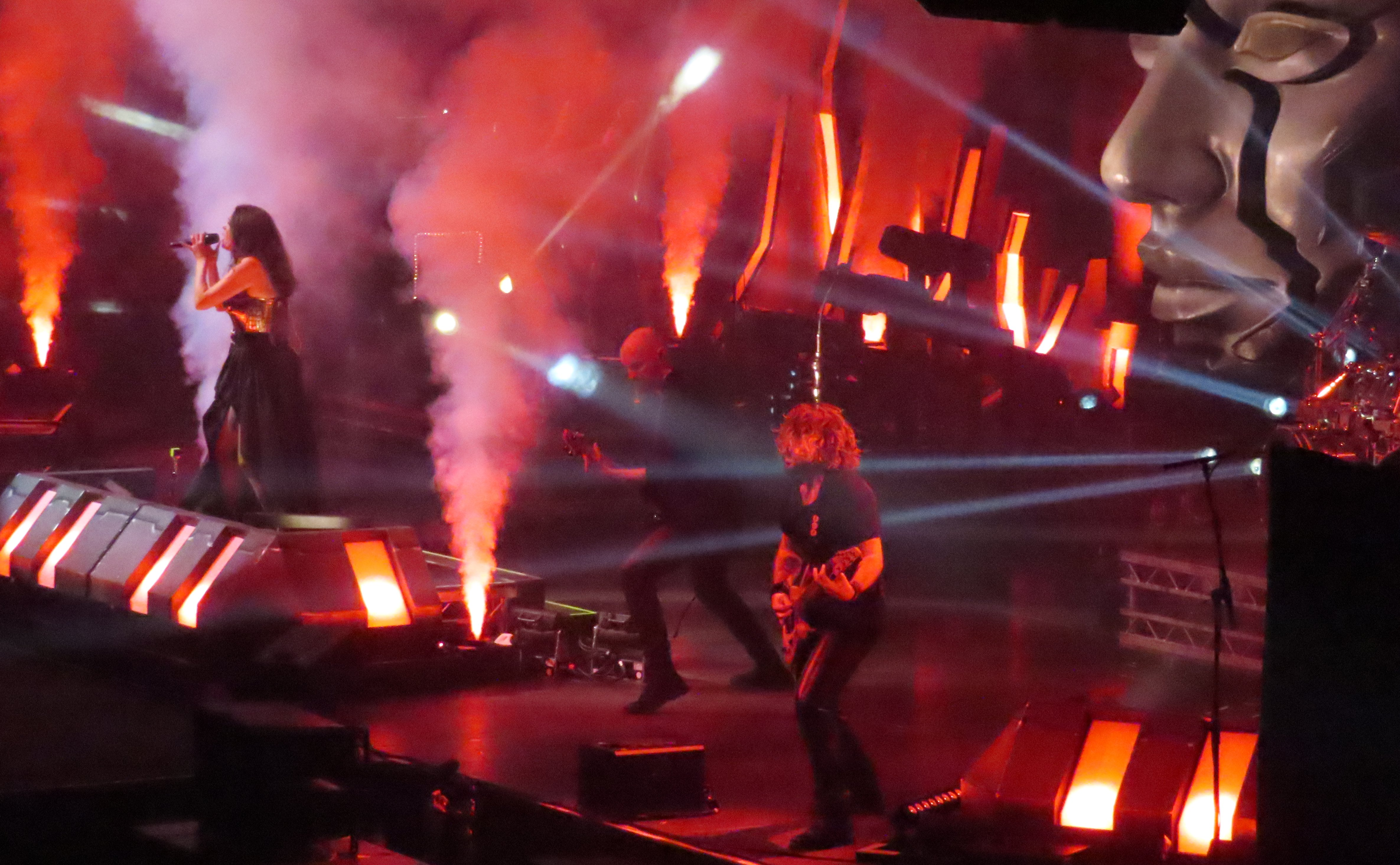
Within Temptation performing in 2022 at The O2 Arena, in London.

On 17 September 2019, the band had originally announced that they would be embarking on a co-headlining tour with Evanescence in April and May 2020 titled Worlds Collide. Due to the COVID-19 pandemic, both Within Temptation and their co-headliner had postponed the tour to September 2020, later postponing it again to fall 2021, and then postponing again to spring 2022. During the outbreak, the band took part in the Together at Home movement, where artists make online live performances in order to encourage people to stay home and prevent more infection cases. The band also opened for Iron Maiden at selected European and North American dates of the Legacy of the Beast World Tour during 2022.

On 30 April 2020, the band announced the release of a new single on 8 May 2020, "Entertain You", scheduled to be part of the band's upcoming eighth studio album. A music video was later released for the single. A second single titled, "The Purge", was released on 20 November 2020 along with a music video. Sharon den Adel confirmed on 18 February 2021 that the band plans on releasing more singles, stating that "they are working on it". A third single, "Shed My Skin", which features German metalcore band Annisokay as special guests was released on 25 June 2021. The band had also announced on 1 June 2021 that they would be performing two virtual reality concerts on 15 and 16 July 2021, entitled "The Aftermath", in which they performed a variety of older and new material. A music video for "Shed My Skin", which consists of the song being performed on the virtual concert, was released on 14 July 2021. Later that year, the re-imagined version of "Forsaken" also performed on the concert was released on streaming platforms. The band's first concert with public attendance after the decrease in the pandemic infection cases took place on 29 July 2021, as one of the main acts of the Kuopio Rock open air festival, in Finland.

In an interview with Audio Ink Radio, vocalist Sharon den Adel had confirmed that the band is planning to release more new music in the coming months, stating: "We've only recorded two songs, and we have a lot of demos, which are very far, so we can finish them quite quickly. So we're just gonna start with that — we're gonna make those demos real songs, and eventually, next year, we're gonna release also a few songs again. Eventually there will be an album, but the album is not complete yet, so we have to start writing also some extra new songs to make the whole album complete".

The band's next musical release came in May 2022 from a collaboration with Asking Alexandria on a new version of their song "Faded Out" from See What's on the Inside. This new version was released alongside a music video featuring promotional scenes leading to the release of the movie The Retaliators. The song is also part of its official soundtrack. The band released another single, "Don't Pray for Me", on 8 July 2022.

On 27 July, den Adel confirmed in an interview that the new album is expected to come out in 2023. On 20 December, the band released the official music video for their track "The Fire Within", a song originally written in 2019.

Another single, "Wireless", was released on 18 May 2023. On 17 August 2023, simultaneously with the release of the single of the same name, Within Temptation announced their eighth studio album, Bleed Out, which was released on 20 October 2023. A European tour of the same name was later announced on 4 October 2023.

In March 2024, Sharon den Adel came to Kyiv to create a new music video together with Alex Yarmak for the song "A Fool's Parade". On April 11, 2024, the band's official channel released the video "A Fool's Parade". In June 2024, after winning several export awards throughout the years, Within Temptation was honored by the Dutch organization Buma Cultuur with a Life Achievement Award. The organization stated that "the band undeniably provided the blueprint for a unique metal genre, which has inspired many and brought the sextet significant success far beyond their home country".

Spierenburg departed from the band on 9 December 2024. Vikram Shankar was later announced as his replacement in July 2025.

== Musical style ==
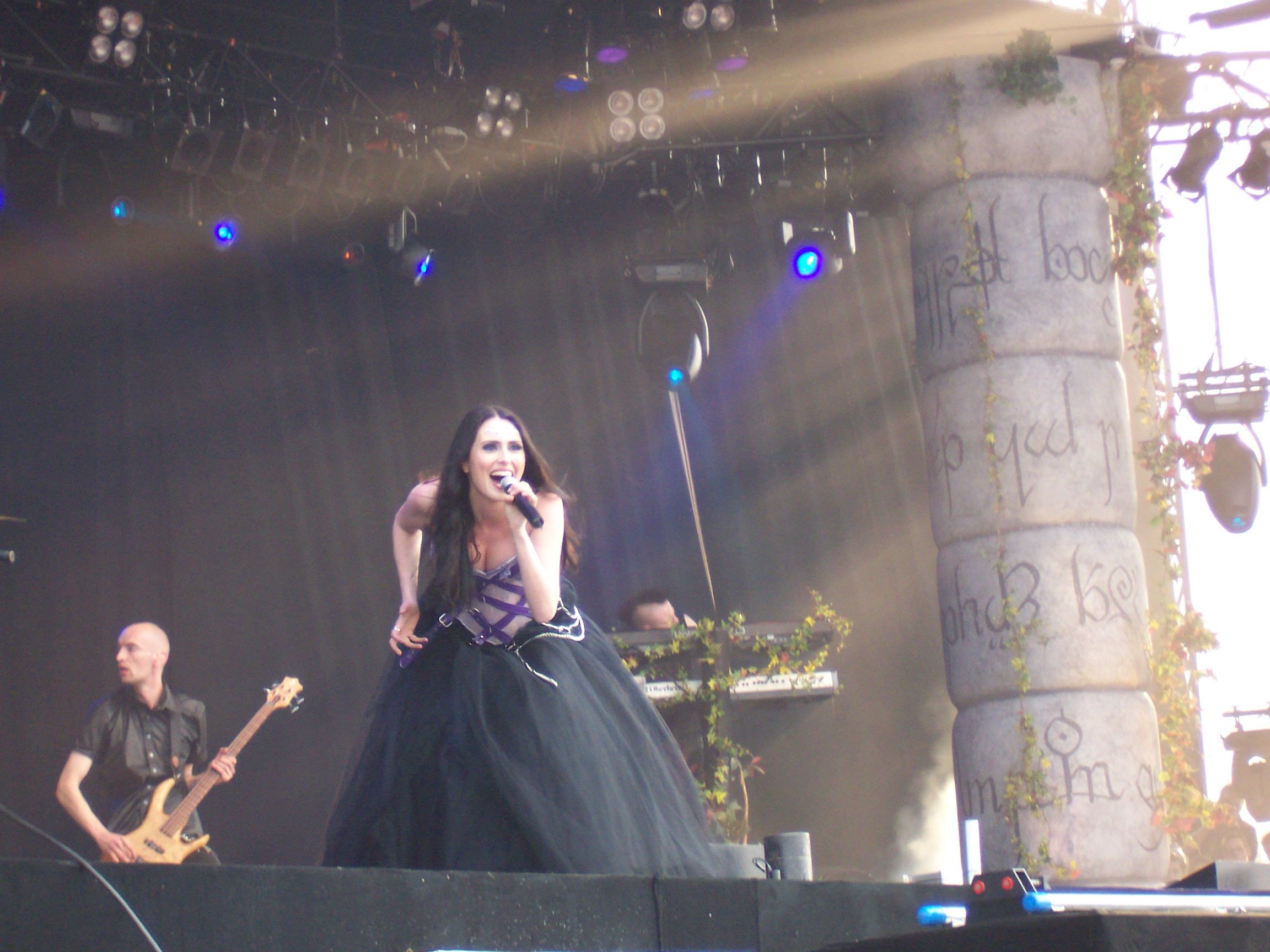
For a time, gothic visual was a common part of Within Temptation's style, as the gothic metal influences were part of their sound, mainly in their early years.

The band's debut album, Enter (1997), was classified as gothic metal and doom metal, described as "gloomy, doomy, slow moving, atmospheric, symphonic gothic metal" and drawing comparisons with Tristania and Theatre of Tragedy. The guitar riffs and keyboard work were also praised, as were the contrasting voices of the two lead vocalists, Sharon den Adel and Robert Westerholt. The band's next record, an EP entitled The Dance, released in 1998, was described as "important in the development of the band" presenting "the band's musical growth as they explore the parameters of orchestral, neo-classical metal."

With the release of the band's second album, Mother Earth, in 2000, their musical style came to a point of inflexion, where only den Adel remained as lead vocalist, leading the band to more melodic and Celtic songs and more folk influences. Critics approved of the changes and suggested that the album "reveals new dimensions in the concept of metal." With Daniel Gibson as its main producer, the following album The Silent Force, released in 2004, was classified as "very melodic, catchy and relaxing".

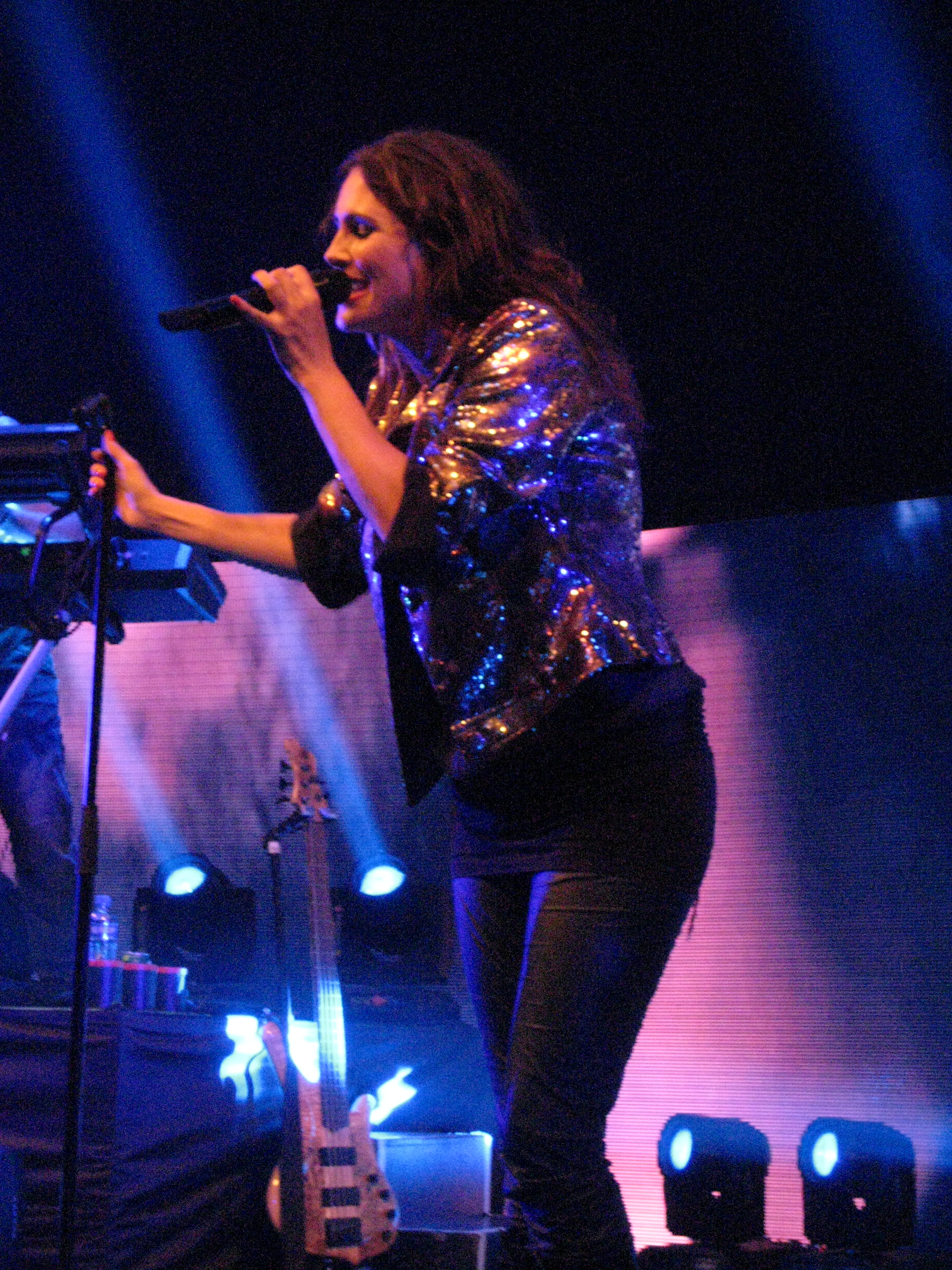
Sharon den Adel wearing a nightclub jacket while performing The Unforgiving's "Sinéad" in 2011.

With the release of The Heart of Everything, in 2007, critics were divided on the band's new direction, though some appreciated the new direction and found it more varied. About.com agreed with both opinions, stating that the album had "the depth and complexity of classical music and the dark edge of gothic metal." AllMusic commented that the band "isn't afraid to get downright symphonic". In an interview around that time, den Adel said they fell into a symphonic rock genre with various influences. In another interview, she stated that "We consider ourselves more an atmospheric melodic symphonic metal/rock band... In my opinion, we are not a gothic band but we have gothic elements".

In 2011, the band released their fifth studio album, The Unforgiving, the biggest change in their musical direction to that point. Although largely well received by critics, some reviewers disliked the changes, with Q magazine calling the album "the metal T'Pau". Besides that, some critics found the "1980s pop, rock and metal" influences a good thing for the band.

In order to celebrate the band's 15th anniversary, Belgian radio station Q-Music invited the band to make 15 covers of famous songs. Later, the band released the album The Q-Music Sessions, another divergent genre variation from their original sound. It featured reworked covers of several famous pop songs, such as "Titanium" by David Guetta featuring Sia, "Grenade" by Bruno Mars, "The Power of Love" by Frankie Goes to Hollywood and also such indie and folk rock songs as The Who's "Behind Blue Eyes" and Passenger's "Let Her Go".

The name of the band's sixth studio album, Hydra, refers to this great variation in the band's main sound, as Westerholt said: "'Hydra' is a perfect title for our new album because like the monster itself, the record represents the many different sides of our music." The Aquarian Weekly considered the title highly appropriate and compared it to the band's diverse musical history, alleging that they were able to find the right balance between all the musical changes and, during the following tour, the sextet was also referred to as "a band that defy stereotypes".

== Band members ==
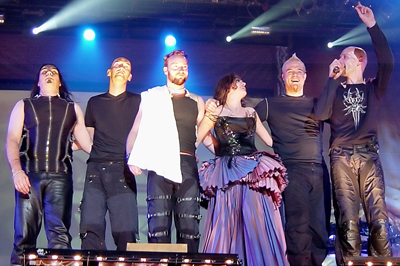
Within Temptation's 2002–2010, from left to right: van Haestregt, van Veen, Jolie, den Adel, Spierenburg, Westerholt

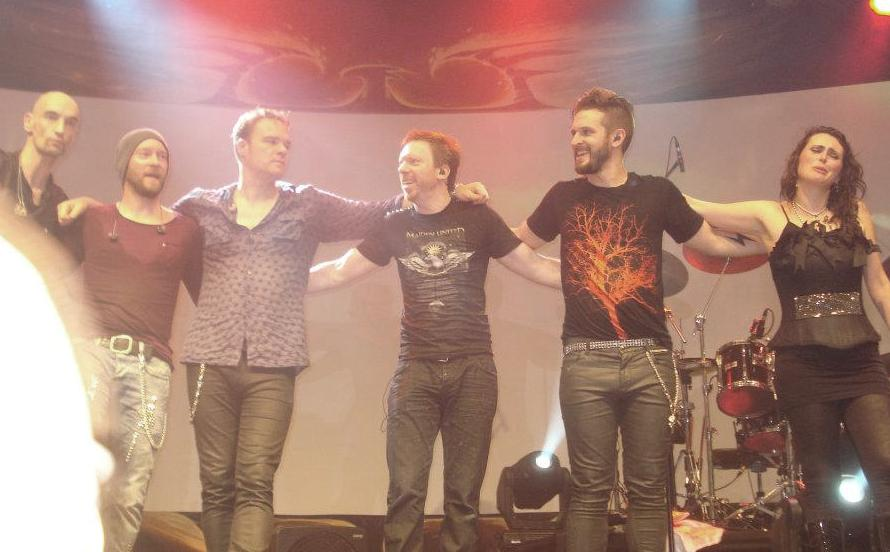
Within Temptation touring line-up between 2011 and 2024. From left to right: van Veen, Jolie, Spierenburg, Coolen, Helleblad, den Adel

Current

- Sharon den Adel – lead vocals (1996–present)
- Robert Westerholt – rhythm guitar, unclean vocals (1996–present, studio only since 2011)
- Jeroen van Veen – bass (1996–present)
- Ruud Jolie – lead guitar (2001–present)
- Mike Coolen – drums (2011–present)
- Stefan Helleblad – rhythm guitar, occasional backing vocals (2011–present)
- Vikram Shankar – keyboards (2025–present; live 2025)

Session

- Nicka Hellenberg – drums (2010)

Former

- Dennis Leeflang – drums (1996)
- Richard Willemse – drums (1996)
- Marius van Pyreen – drums (1998)
- Ciro Palma – drums (1998–1999)
- Michiel Papenhove – lead guitar (1996–2001)
- Martijn Westerholt – keyboards (1996–2001; live 2025)
- Ivar de Graaf – drums (1996–1998, 1999–2001, live bass 2022)
- Jelle Bakker – lead guitar (2001)
- Stephen van Haestregt – drums (2002–2010)
- Martijn Spierenburg – keyboards (2001–2024)

Timeline

== Discography ==
Studio albums

- Enter (1997)
- Mother Earth (2000)
- The Silent Force (2004)
- The Heart of Everything (2007)
- The Unforgiving (2011)
- Hydra (2014)
- Resist (2019)
- Bleed Out (2023)

== Tours ==
Headlining concerts

- Mother Earth Tour (2000–2003)
- The Silent Force Tour (2004–2006)
- The Heart of Everything World Tour (2007–2008)
- The Unforgiving Tour (2011–2013)
- Sanctuary (2012)
- Hydra World Tour (2014–2016)
- The Resist Tour (2018–2019)
- Bleed Out Tour (2024–2025)

Co-headlining concerts

- Worlds Collide (with Evanescence) (2022)

Supporting concerts

- Somewhere Back in Time World Tour (opening act for Iron Maiden) (2008)
- Legacy of the Beast World Tour (opening act for Iron Maiden) (2022)
