= Let Us Burn – Elements & Hydra Live in Concert =

Video by Within Temptation
- Released: (Japan) 12 November 2014 (Europe) 14 November 2014 (United Kingdom) 17 November 2014 (United States) 25 November 2014
- Recorded: 13 November 2012 (Elements); 2 & 3 May 2014 (Hydra)
- Venue: Sportpaleis (Elements); AFAS Live (Hydra)
- Genre: Symphonic metal
- Length: 170 Min
- Label: BMG
- Director: "Elements"; Robert Westerholt; Marteen Welzen "Hydra"; Oscar Verport
- Producer: Arjan Rietvink; Within Temptation

Within Temptation video chronology
Black Symphony (2008)	Let Us Burn – Elements & Hydra Live in Concert (2014)	Worlds Collide Tour - Live in Amsterdam (2024)

Within Temptation chronology
Hydra (2014)	Let Us Burn – Elements & Hydra Live in Concert (2014)	Resist (2019)

Professional ratings
Review scores
Source	Rating
About.com	4/5 stars
Gazet van Antwerpen	3/5 stars
Metal Hammer (Ger)	5/5 stars
Metal Hammer (UK)	4.5/5 stars

Let Us Burn – Elements & Hydra Live in Concert (or simply Let Us Burn) is the fifth live album by Dutch symphonic metal band Within Temptation. It was released in November, 2014 and is available on 2-disc DVD, 2-disc CD, 2-disc Blu-ray and digital album. The live album features two performances, being the first one the greatest part of the band's 15th anniversary concert at the Sportpaleis, titled Elements, and the second one the band's performance at the AFAS Live during the Hydra World Tour.

== Background ==
On 9 May 2012, the band officially announced a special concert titled "Elements" at the Sportpaleis, in Antwerp, in celebration of their 15-year anniversary. Il Novecento Orchestra accompanied the band among other special guests, including ex-band members and former Orphanage vocalist George Oosthoek. The show was sold out with fans from over 50 reported countries in attendance. No plans for a video album were in mind at the time, and as the band disliked the final result, they moved forward on the next album tour. As Hydra was released, the band decided to record a live album featuring a concert and announced via their Facebook account that they were going to record the concert in Amsterdam at the same evening for a later release. During an interview for Sonic Cathedral, lead vocalist Sharon den Adel stated that the plan was originally to make a Hydra live album as plans for the Elements concert turning into a live album were early dropped as the band found themselves unhappy with the result, so they opted to left only a few songs as extra content, but in the edition final process they decided to change the main concert to Elements as they realized the event was an important moment for their history, and after some work on the material they considered it a worthy material then. Den Adel also commented that having Black Symphony as the previous live video released, Elements would be the only possible follow up as it wasn't a common concert. Some ex-members were invited to the Elements concert as they were somehow part of the band's history, as Martijn Westerholt and Michiel Papenhove. Both of them executed their original instruments during the track "Candles", in which was composed while they're still band's studio or touring members at the time.

Both concerts had missing songs on the final edition cut. The concert at the Sportpaleis also featured "Never-Ending Story", "Titanium", "Summertime Sadness", "Grenade", "Memories", "What Have You Done" and "Our Farewell" while the concert at the Heineken Music Hall missed "Our Solemn Hour", "Angels", "See Who I Am", "The Cross" and "Summertime Sadness".

Upon its release, Let Us Burn charted on multiple charts, including number 5 on the Dutch Album charts, as well as number 2 on the United Kingdom Music Video charts, their first to do so.

== Track listing ==
All lyrics are written by Sharon den Adel and Robert Westerholt, except where noted.

Elements Concert
No.	Title	Music	Length
1.	"Intro"	den Adel, Westerholt
2.	"Iron"	Westerholt, Daniel Gibson	5:44
3.	"In the Middle of the Night" (lyrics: den Adel, Westerholt, Gibson)	den Adel, Westerholt, Gibson	5:11
4.	"Faster" (lyrics: den Adel, Westerholt, Gibson)	den Adel, Westerholt, Gibson	4:25
5.	"Fire and Ice"	den Adel, Martijn Spierenburg	3:54
6.	"Our Solemn Hour"	den Adel, Spierenburg	5:16
7.	"Stand My Ground"	Gibson, Han'some	4:28
8.	"Angels"	den Adel, Spierenburg	4:12
9.	"Sanctuary" (Intro)	den Adel, Westerholt	2:01
10.	"The Last Dance" (lyrics: Spierenburg, Westerholt, den Adel)	Spierenburg, Westerholt, den Adel	4:30
11.	"Say My Name"	den Adel, Westerholt	4:06
12.	"Candles" (featuring George Oosthoek)	den Adel, Westerholt	7:03
13.	"Sinéad" (lyrics: den Adel, Westerholt, Gibson, Spierenburg)	den Adel, Westerholt, Gibson, Spierenburg	4:20
14.	"The Promise"	den Adel, Westerholt	8:10
15.	"Mother Earth"	Westerholt, Guus Eikens	5:33
16.	"Ice Queen"	den Adel, Westerholt	4:54
17.	"Stairway to the Skies"	den Adel, Spierenburg	6:21

Hydra Concert
No.	Title	Music	Length
1.	"Intro"	den Adel, Westerholt
2.	"Let Us Burn" (lyrics: den Adel, Westerholt, Daniel Gibson)	Westerholt, Gibson	5:24
3.	"Paradise (What About Us?)" (featuring Tarja on screen)	den Adel, Martijn Spierenburg	5:23
4.	"Faster" (lyrics: den Adel, Westerholt, Gibson)	den Adel, Westerholt, Gibson	4:22
5.	"Iron"	Westerholt, Gibson	5:37
6.	"Edge of the World"	den Adel, Juno Jimmink	4:59
7.	"In the Middle of the Night" (lyrics: den Adel, Westerholt, Gibson)	den Adel, Westerholt, Gibson	5:14
8.	"Dangerous" (featuring Howard Jones on screen)	Westerholt, Gibson	4:51
9.	"And We Run" (featuring Xzibit on screen; lyrics: den Adel, Westerholt, Alvin Joiner)	den Adel, Westerholt, Joiner	3:56
10.	"Stand My Ground"	Gibson, Han'some	5:18
11.	"Covered by Roses"	den Adel, Spierenburg	5:12
12.	"Mother Earth"	Westerholt, Guus Eikens	5:50
13.	"What Have You Done" (featuring Keith Caputo on screen)	den Adel, Westerholt	5:02
14.	"Silver Moonlight" (featuring Robert Westerholt)	den Adel, Spierenburg	5:42
15.	"Whole World Is Watching" (acoustic; lyrics: den Adel, Westerholt, Gibson)	Westerholt, Gibson	3:02
16.	"Sinéad" (acoustic; lyrics: den Adel, Westerholt, Gibson, Spierenburg)	den Adel, Westerholt, Gibson, Spierenburg	3:21
17.	"Ice Queen"	den Adel, Westerholt	5:05

== Personnel ==
- Sharon den Adel – vocals
- Ruud Jolie – lead guitar
- Stefan Helleblad – rhythm guitar
- Jeroen van Veen – bass
- Martijn Spierenburg – keyboards
- Mike Coolen – drums

=== Guest musicians ===
- George Oosthoek – growls on "Candles" at Elements
- Robert Westerholt – rhythm guitar on Elements and growls on "Silver Moonlight" at Hydra
- Martijn Westerholt – keyboards on "Candles" at Elements
- Michiel Papenhove – lead guitar on "Candles" at Elements
- Koen van den Broek – percussion on "The Last Dance" at Elements
- Milangelo Martis – percussion on "The Last Dance" at Elements
- Il Novecento Orchestra
- Fine Fleur Choir

== Chart positions ==
=== Album ===
Album Chart (2014)	Peak position
Austrian Albums (Ö3 Austria)	75
Belgian Albums (Ultratop Flanders)	34
Belgian Albums (Ultratop Wallonia)	52
Dutch Albums (Album Top 100)	5
French Albums (SNEP)	66
German Albums (Offizielle Top 100)	26
US Top Hard Rock Albums (Billboard)	20

=== DVD ===
DVD Chart (2014)	Peak position
Japan DVD (Oricon)	46
Swedish DVD (Sverigetopplistan)	3
Swiss DVD (Schweizer Hitparade)	2
UK DVD (Official Charts Company)	2
