= Hydra (Within Temptation album) =

Studio album by Within Temptation
- Released: January 22, 2014
- Recorded: April–October 2013
- Studios: MCO (Hilversum, The Netherlands); Graveland Studio (Kortenhoef, The Netherlands); 6DC Studio (The Netherlands); Crumbling Wall Studios (Sweden)
- Genre: Symphonic metal
- Length: 49:36; 1:30:50 (with one bonus disc); 2:23:33 (with two bonus disc)
- Labels: Nuclear Blast; Dramatico; BMG; Universal; Within Temptation
- Producer: Daniel Gibson

Within Temptation chronology
The Q-Music Sessions (2013)	Hydra (2014)	Let Us Burn – Elements & Hydra Live in Concert (2014)

Singles from Hydra
- 1. "Paradise (What About Us?)" Released: September 27, 2013; 2. "Dangerous" Released: December 20, 2013; 3. "Whole World Is Watching" Released: January 22, 2014; 4. "And We Run" Released: May 23, 2014

Hydra is the sixth studio album by Dutch symphonic metal band Within Temptation. It was released on January 31, 2014 in Europe and on February 4, 2014 in North America. The album contains guest appearances by singer Howard Jones (ex-Killswitch Engage), rapper Xzibit, metal vocalist Tarja Turunen (ex-Nightwish) and alternative rock singer Dave Pirner (Soul Asylum). The first single, "Paradise (What About Us?)", was released on September 27, 2013, and featured Turunen as guest vocalist. The second single, "Dangerous", was released on December 20, in which Jones provided the male vocals.

This is the first album by Within Temptation to be recorded with three guitarists, with Stefan Helleblad making his Within Temptation studio debut on Hydra since his addition to the band shortly after the release of The Unforgiving in 2011. Hydra is also the first Within Temptation album to feature Robert Westerholt's growling techniques since the band's debut album, Enter, in 1997.

== Background and composition ==
The writing process of the album began in 2012, and at the first half of the year the band had six songs written already. The album was originally scheduled to be released worldwide in September, by their new label, BMG and in the Netherlands by Universal Music.

On June 16, without finishing the whole album, the band went on to record the first music video for the new album. During a series of statements about the recording progress of the album, Westerholt stated that the album would contain death growls. In mid-May, bassist Jeroen van Veen went to the studio to record the bass base for the first five songs. The band eventually got a North American sign deal with Nuclear Blast. The band also established a licensing deal with Dramatico for the United Kingdom release of the album. Once the drumming and vocal recording were complete, the final guitar recordings started on August 26, and finished on October 22.

On August 30, the band announced that the lead single "Paradise (What About Us?)" would be released as an EP, also set to feature three tracks from the upcoming album in their demo form, being them "Let Us Burn", "Silver Moonlight" and "Dog Days". Upon making this announcement, den Adel said: "By releasing these demos we want to invite you in our home studio and show how we capture song ideas at an early stage of creating a new album. These demo versions are far from their final sound on the album, but will give you a hint of what we're working on. It will be fascinating to hear how the end result will sound like, once the album is released.". After announcing that the lead single would contain a guest musician, on September 13 the band officially announced that Tarja Turunen was set to appear as a special vocalist on the title song.

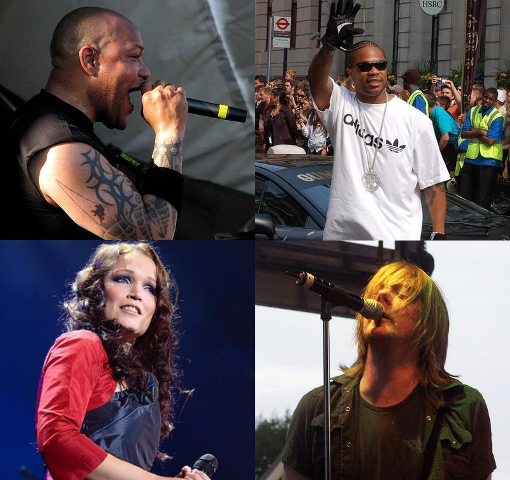
The album features four guest vocalists, each one contributing a different musical style in order to create the varied musical experience proposed by the band. Pictured: Jones, Xzibit, Turunen and Pirner.

The album's name was revealed on November 8, along with the official track list, all guest musicians and the cover art, designed by Romano Molenaar, the same artist who made the cover for The Unforgiving. The album title refers to the great variation in musical genres the band improves on with each new release. About the concept, guitarist Robert Westerholt says: "Hydra is a perfect title for our new album, because like the monster itself, the record represents the many different sides of our music." According to the ancient Greek mythology, the Hydra was a giant multi-headed serpent that, for each severed head, sprang forth two more in their place.

As the title, the sound composition of the album was said to be varied, as Westerholt said, also referring to the album title, that they "wanted it to be a real Within Temptation record, but heavier, more musically challenging, pushing borders and frontiers with new elements and influences, and at the same time bring back more from our early metal roots... a bit like the past and future at the same time." During an interview for Ultimate Guitar Archive, den Adel said that the main improvement on the last two records, in which is the transition to the symphonic metal itself to a more varied and multi-oriented sound, came from the fact that the band was considering itself "being in a box" where it could only sound in a restricted way inside its own genre and, having sold out all the possible elements in their 2007 release The Heart of Everything, the band decided to "let all boundaries go musically where [they] were not allowed to go" and improve their sound with "anything [that] can come out" and fit on the album.

"Well, the case is more the fact we let go of a certain way of songwriting how we used it in the past. Like, in the past, we had a certain idea about how we wanted to sound and what we were allowed to be within our genre. Nowadays we feel like with The Heart Of Everything, we felt like we finalized this symphonic kind of sound we were searching for all those years."

— Sharon den Adel, about incorporating new elements outside the symphonic metal genre

=== Structure and inspirations ===
On answering a fan during a Q&A session on Twitter, den Adel commented that the main inspiration for the songs on the album were "the big things in life". The first track, "Let Us Burn", is more guitar-oriented with less orchestrations and presents an air of melancholy, in order to propose "real direct emotion in a way". "Dangerous", the second track and second single, is about thrill seekers and daredevils, illustrating people who need to live on the edge. The song contains fast riffs, distorted synthesizers, an over-use of drum bass in comparing with the band typical musical structures and features a fast and heavy uptempo nature that matters well the subject as also the music video, that features renowned skydiver Jokke Sommer performing gliding through the air and pulling off stunts.

"And We Run" was the band's first track ever to contain rap vocals in an unexpected duet with American rapper Xzibit. According to den Adel, the main fact that the band decided to invite him was his open-mind for experimenting. The song introduces itself with a piano and den Adel's clean singing right to chorus when she uses her high voice until Xzibit enters, contrasting with his rap vocals and dark, deep voice. Xzibit was allowed to do his parts in his own way as the band wanted it to be original and coming from the rapper's perspective. According to Westerholt, there was an initial criticism about the collaboration, as it appeared to run so far from their original musical style, and then an unexpected praise for the song.

The first track to be revealed was "Paradise (What About Us?)". As it is closer to their symphonic metal roots, the band choose to invite musical genre fellow and former Nightwish vocalist Tarja Turunen, as it is also on her comfort zone. On collaborating with Turunen, den Adel stated that they "immediately clicked, not only creatively but personally" as "it felts completely natural that [they] would do this together". The song features many strings, fast drums, heavy guitars and orchestrations as den Adel delivers a lighter and more natural tone and Turunen a deeper and more powerful singing. Lyrically the song is about collectivity and it is based on the speech given by retired four-star general Peter van Uhm on May 4, 2013, which addressed the importance of not thinking only of "yourself" or "them", but "us". On reviewing the earlier EP, critic Simon Bower described it as "every female fronted metal fan utopian song" mainly because of the cited duet.

== Promotion ==
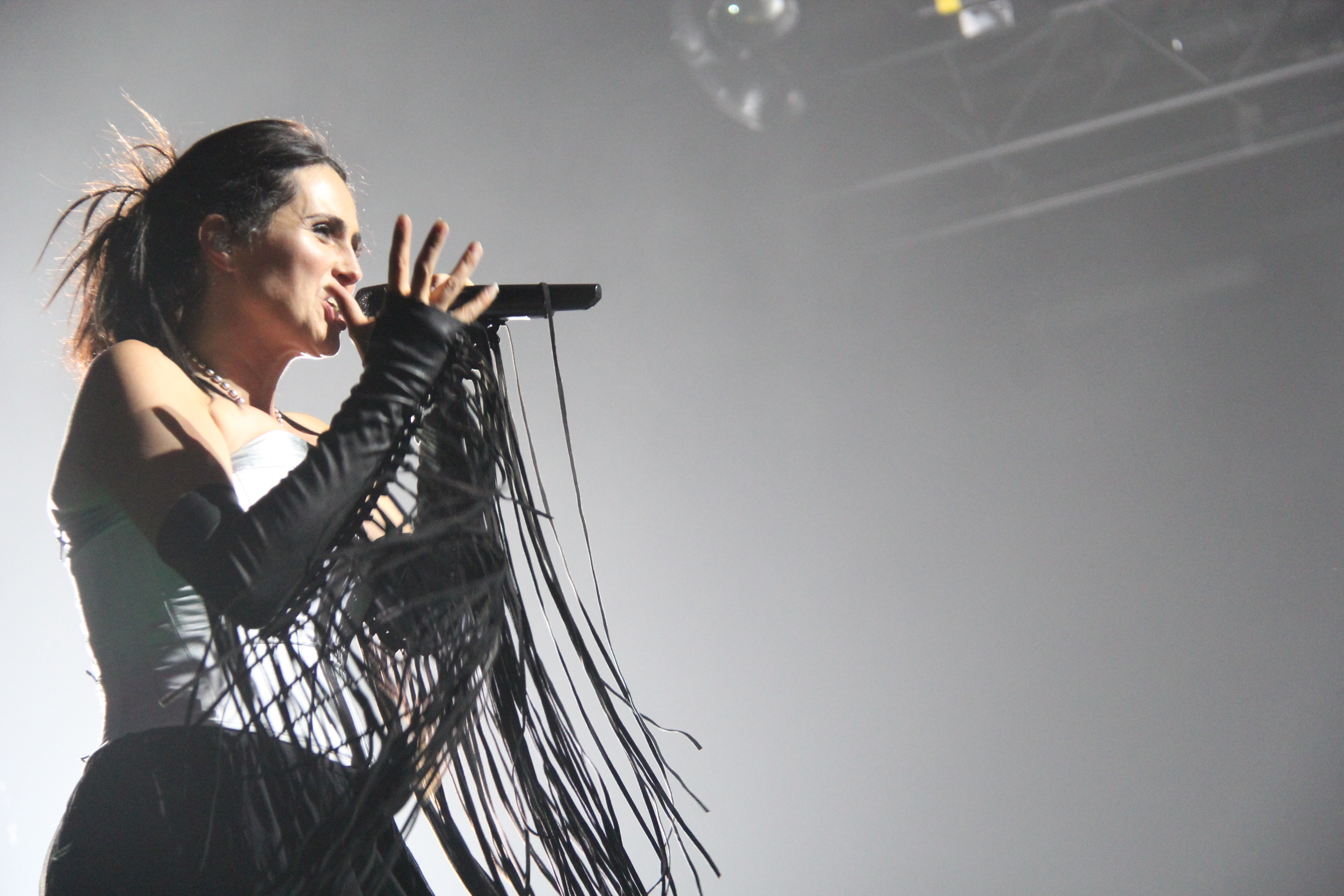
Lead vocalist Sharon den Adel at the Club Nokia, Los Angeles, during the North American leg of the Hydra World Tour.

On July 12, the first material came to the public eye, with the band revealing a teaser trailer, with no title or song titles revealed. In the next month, the band announced the title of the lead single, "Paradise (What About Us?)", also uploading a teaser trailer revealing some lyrics and a guitar solo in anticipation for the release. The music video and EP were released on September 27. On October 25 and 26, den Adel and Westerholt presented an unknown number of songs to the press. The official teaser trailer came out on November 8, along with the official announcement of the album name and release dates. On November 21, the band revealed that it was working again with director Patric Ullaeus, who made the video of "Mother Earth", on two new music videos to promote the album, being them "Dangerous" featuring Howard Jones, which was released on December 20, and "Whole World is Watching" featuring Dave Pirner. At the end of November, Sharon traveled to Finland to start promoting the album on a radio station and present it to the press in France, Germany and the United Kingdom. On December 4, the first show of the upcoming promotional tour to have the tickets to be sold out was the one at the Heineken Music Hall, Amsterdam. During the promotional travelings, den Adel gave critics and radio stations access to the recording, and the first public impression from the album came through German radio station Rock Antenne, which classified the album as "fast" and "heavy" and gave it a score of 5/5. The third single, "Whole World Is Watching", was the chosen song for the album promotion in Poland, debuting on the Polish national radio station Polskie Radio Program III on January 10, 2014, in a special version featuring Polish singer Piotr Rogucki. The band then went on a special trip to the United States to promote a listening party in Los Angeles on January 24, with the presence of den Adel, Westerholt and Jolie, a signing session in New Jersey and to promote the album on radio stations. In the meantime, the band appeared for the first time on the cover of an American magazine. A few days later, on January 15, 2014, the main version of the song, featuring Pirner, was released as a promotional song on Dutch/Belgian radio station Q-music. As heading back to Europe, the band went on to visit popular Dutch radio stations such as 538 and 3FM and television programs for interviews and acoustic performances. On January 20, the band announced a try-out show for the upcoming tour at the Effenaar, in Eindhoven (NL), to be held on February 20, having the tickets sold out on the same day. The tour was originally planned to start in January 2014, but it was postponed to a month later, so the band could polish more the songs before releasing the album and also have more time to rehearsals for the following tour. After this period of radio and television appearances for acoustic performances and interviews, the band is embarked on the Hydra World Tour, engaging on a try-out show on February 20 at the Effenaar, Eindhoven. Tickest for the show were completely sold out at the same day it was put on sale. The first official show occurred on February 26, in Helsinki, Finland, and the arena tour was scheduled to pass primarily in Europe before the summer festivals season. Due to great demand, additional shows were announced and several venues were changed to larger ones with the intention to accommodate more people. At the end of the European leg, the tour had an attendance of over 120.000 people.

== Critical reception ==
Professional ratings
Review scores
Source	Rating
About.com	4/5 stars
Allmusic	3.5/5 stars
Loudwire	4/5 stars
Metal Hammer	6/7
Metal Storm	8.4/10
Rock Hard	7.5/10
Rock n Reel	4/5 stars
Sputnikmusic	3.5/5 stars

Hydra received critical acclaim upon release. The first public impression from the album, through German radio station Rock Antenne, described the album as "fast" and "heavy", giving it a score of 5/5. Music magazine Reflections of Darkness scored the album 10/10, classifying it more "earthly and modern" in comparing with the previous releases that featured a more "celestial romance and coldness" atmosphere. While commenting the new "fashionable influences" due to the special guests and other musical directions, the review ended alleging that "still symphonic metal and progressive elements are [there] for those who are never tired of flawlessness, who value high-quality music and who are no strangers to the classical heritage." Rustyn Rose, from Metalholic webzine, also praised the album by giving it a score of 9.3 out of 10, primarily referring to the band's return to "its heavier and dramatic foundation" while also "continuing to grow and expand its boundaries". About the guest singers, the reviewer commented that the song styling was diverse, but the band managed well to put the genres crossing on their own style. At the end of the review, Rose called it "a masterful recording." British website Rock n Reel awarded the album 4 out 5 stars, also pointing the "mix of styles" presented in the record, especially the introduction of rap verses (making it as a rap/nu metal styles) in the track "And We Run" and comparing the collaboration with Xzibit to that of Linkin Park and Jay-Z, while commenting that "it works pretty well". Besides that, reviewer classified the album as "full of synths, airy guitars, excellent backing vocals and harmonies." Eric Hunker, from American website The Front Row Report, praised the album and lamented their low popularity in the United States while crowding arenas in their native land, saying that "Hydra is bound to thrust them onto the global stage and finally garner them the attention and respect they so richly deserve" while calling them "musical geniuses". Hunker alleged that "Hydra finds [Within Temptation] further pushing their boundaries, exploring new elements and influences, while at the same time revisiting their heavier metal roots" and gave the album a score of 9.5 out of 10. Adam Rees, from Metal Hammer, placed the album number 20 at the Metal Hammer staff best of 2014 list.

=== Critics' lists ===
Critic/Publication	List	Rank	Ref.
De Telegraaf	Best 2014 Dutch Albums	4	
Metal Storm	Readers Top Symphonic Metal Albums of 2014	3	
Metalholic	50 Best Hard Rock and Metal Albums of 2014	13	

=== Accolades ===
Year	Ceremony	Award	Result
2014	AIM Awards	Independent Album of the Year	Nominated
2014	Metal Hammer Awards	Best Album	Nominated
2014	World Music Awards	World's Best Album	Nominated
2015	Independent Music Companies Association Awards	European Independent Album of the Year	Nominated

== Commercial performance ==
The album debuted at number six on the UK Albums Chart on February 9, 2014, making it the band's highest charting album in the country, with The Unforgiving charting at number 23. In the Netherlands, Hydra marked the band's return to the first position on the charts since the release of The Heart of Everything in 2007, as The Unforgiving's peak position was number two. The album also reached the number one position on the Czech Republic album charts, making it their first number-one album outside the Netherlands. The album was also the first one to enter the US Billboard 200 in a top 20 position, charting at the number 16 and selling over 15,000 copies in the first week of release, a position far better than the predecessor The Unforgiving, which reached number 50. The album also reached number one on the American Top Hard Rock album charts. At that time, Hydra also became the group's highest charted album in Austria, France, Germany, and Switzerland. Considering the great reception of both the album and tour on the North American market, Nuclear Blast opted to release a re-issue of the out-of-print albums Enter and The Dance on November 10, 2014, in order to give people access to the band's early material.

== Track listing ==
All lyrics are written by Sharon den Adel and Robert Westerholt, except where noted.

No.	Title	Lyrics	Music	Length
1.	"Let Us Burn"	den Adel; Westerholt; Daniel Gibson	Westerholt; Gibson	5:31
2.	"Dangerous" (featuring Howard Jones)		Westerholt; Gibson	4:53
3.	"And We Run" (featuring Xzibit)	den Adel; Westerholt; Alvin Joiner	den Adel; Westerholt; Joiner	3:50
4.	"Paradise (What About Us?)" (featuring Tarja)		den Adel; Martijn Spierenburg	5:20
5.	"Edge of the World"		den Adel; Juno Jimmink	4:55
6.	"Silver Moonlight"		den Adel; Spierenburg	5:17
7.	"Covered by Roses"		den Adel; Spierenburg	4:48
8.	"Dog Days"		den Adel; Spierenburg	4:47
9.	"Tell Me Why"		Westerholt; Gibson	6:12
10.	"Whole World Is Watching" (featuring Dave Pirner, or Piotr Rogucki on the Polish edition)	den Adel; Westerholt; Gibson	Westerholt; Gibson	4:03
Total length:				49:36

Japanese edition bonus tracks
No.	Title	Writer(s)	Length
11.	"Grenade" (Bruno Mars cover, track 15 on Japanese special edition)	Bruno Mars; Philip Lawrence; Ari Levine; Brody Brown; Claude Kelly; Andrew Wyatt	3:44
12.	"The Power of Love" (Frankie Goes to Hollywood cover, track 16 on Japanese special edition)	Peter Gill; Holly Johnson; Mark O'Toole	4:00
Total length:			57:20

Premium version bonus disc or U.S. iTunes Store Special Edition bonus tracks
No.	Title	Writer(s)	Length
11.	"Radioactive" (Imagine Dragons cover)	Ben McKee; Daniel Platzman; Dan Reynolds; Wayne Sermon; Alexander Grant; Josh Mosser	3:14
12.	"Summertime Sadness" (Lana Del Rey cover)	Lana Del Rey; Rick Nowels	4:06
13.	"Let Her Go" (Passenger cover)	Michael David Rosenberg	3:43
14.	"Dirty Dancer" (Enrique Iglesias cover)	Enrique Iglesias; Nadir Khayat; Evan Bogart; Erika Nuri; David Quiñones	4:14
15.	"And We Run" (Evolution track, moved to track 17 on Japanese special edition)	den Adel; Westerholt; Joiner	5:40
16.	"Silver Moonlight" (Evolution track, moved to track 18 on Japanese special edition)	den Adel; Spierenburg; Westerholt	6:04
17.	"Covered by Roses" (Evolution track, moved to track 19 on Japanese special edition)	den Adel; Spierenburg; Westerholt	4:42
18.	"Tell Me Why" (Evolution track, moved to track 20 on Japanese special edition)	Westerholt; Gibson; den Adel	4:59
Total length:			44:26

3xCD boxed set deluxe (instrumental)
No.	Title	Length
21.	"Let Us Burn" (instrumental)	5:31
22.	"Dangerous" (instrumental)	4:53
23.	"And We Run" (instrumental)	3:50
24.	"Paradise" (instrumental)	5:20
25.	"Edge of the World" (instrumental)	4:55
26.	"Silver Moonlight" (instrumental)	5:16
27.	"Covered by Roses" (instrumental)	4:47
28.	"Dog Days" (instrumental)	4:47
29.	"Tell Me Why" (instrumental)	6:12
30.	"Whole World Is Watching" (instrumental)	4:02
Total length:		49:32

2025 Extended Edition
No.	Title	Length
11.	"Keep On Breathing" (demo version)	3:02
12.	"One of These Days" (demo version)	2:31
13.	"Living on Fire" (demo version)	2:43
14.	"Whole World Is Watching" (feat. Piotr Rogucki)	4:01

The tenth 2024 anniversary edition LP includes all tracks from the deluxe edition of "Hydra" and all tracks from the 2025 extended edition of the album.

== Deluxe box set ==
- a 2CD Media Book (the entire premium version of the album, including the bonus tracks mentioned above)
- a double vinyl gatefold
- a songbook with all of the lyrics
- a CD with instrumental versions from tracks 1 to 10
- an exclusive WT guitar pick
- packaged in an LP size Deluxe Box Set

== Personnel ==
Within Temptation

- Sharon den Adel – lead vocals
- Ruud Jolie – lead guitar
- Robert Westerholt – rhythm guitar, growling vocals on tracks 6 & 9
- Stefan Helleblad – rhythm guitar
- Martijn Spierenburg – keyboards
- Jeroen van Veen – bass
- Mike Coolen – drums

Additional musicians

- Howard Jones (ex-Killswitch Engage, Light the Torch and Blood Has Been Shed) – clean male vocals on track 2
- Xzibit – rap vocals on track 3
- Tarja Turunen – vocals on track 4
- David Pirner (Soul Asylum) – vocals on track 10
- Piotr Rogucki (Coma) – vocals on track 10 (Polish edition)
- Frank van Essen – violin
- Jonas Pap – cello

Production

- Daniel Gibson – producer and programming
- Robert Westerholt – producer
- Juno Jimmink – additional production
- Arno Krabman – editing, bass engineer, drum editing, drum engineering
- Stefan Helleblad – editing and Guitar engineer
- Ruud Jolie – guitar engineer
- Martijn Spierenburg – orchestration and orchestra production
- Stefan Glaumann – mixing
- Ted Jensen – mastering

== Charts ==
=== Weekly charts ===
Chart (2014–15)	Peak position
Australian Albums (ARIA)	26
Austrian Albums (Ö3 Austria)	5
Belgian Albums (Ultratop Flanders)	4
Belgian Albums (Ultratop Wallonia)	13
Canadian Albums (Billboard)	25
Czech Albums (ČNS IFPI)	1
Danish Albums (Hitlisten)	27
Dutch Albums (Album Top 100)	1
Finnish Albums (Suomen virallinen lista)	2
French Albums (SNEP)	13
German Albums (Offizielle Top 100)	4
Irish Albums (IRMA)	87
Italian Albums (FIMI)	73
Japanese Albums (Oricon)	22
Norwegian Albums (VG-lista)	15
Polish Albums (ZPAV)	4
Portuguese Albums (AFP)	11
Scottish Albums (Official Charts)	5
Spanish Albums (Promusicae)	28
Swedish Albums (Sverigetopplistan)	12
Swiss Albums (Schweizer Hitparade)	2
UK Albums (Official Charts)	6
UK Independent Albums (Official Charts)	2
UK Rock & Metal Albums (OCC)	1
US Billboard 200	16
US Digital Albums (Billboard)	12
US Top Rock Albums (Billboard)	4
US Top Hard Rock Albums (Billboard)	1

=== Year-end charts ===
Chart (2014)	Position
Belgian Albums (Ultratop Flanders)	77
Belgian Albums (Ultratop Wallonia)	134
Dutch Albums (MegaCharts)	35
German Albums (Offizielle Top 100)	86
Swiss Albums (Schweizer Hitparade)	90
US Billboard Hard Rock Albums	45

== Release history ==
Region	Date	Label	Format(s)
Japan	January 22, 2014	Victor	CD; digital download; vinyl
Europe	January 31, 2014	BMG	CD; digital download; vinyl
Brazil	January 31, 2014	Hellion	CD; digital download; vinyl
North America	February 4, 2014	Nuclear Blast	CD; digital download; vinyl
United Kingdom	February 4, 2014	Dramatico	CD; digital download; vinyl
