= Mother Earth Tour =

Live album by Within Temptation

Video by Within Temptation
- Released: 17 November 2003
- Recorded: 2002
- Venues: Rock Werchter; Pukkelpop; Lowlands
- Genre: Symphonic metal
- Length: 183:30
- Labels: Sony/BMG, GUN
- Producer: Guido Aalbers

Within Temptation video chronology
Mother Earth Tour (2003)	The Silent Force Tour (2005)

Mother Earth Tour

Live album by Within Temptation
- Released: 17 November 2003
- Recorded: 2002
- Venues: Rock Werchter; Pukkelpop; Lowlands
- Genre: Symphonic metal
- Length: 66:28
- Label: GUN

Within Temptation chronology
Mother Earth (2000)	Mother Earth Tour (2003)	The Silent Force (2005)

Mother Earth Tour is the first live album by Dutch symphonic metal band Within Temptation. It was released as a double DVD, including a live CD with the track list of the first DVD. The first disc features a live concert with footage from the 2002 rock festivals Rock Werchter, Pukkelpop and Lowlands.

Songs from this live DVD were also used in singles, and special editions of Mother Earth.

The video album was a winner of the 2003 Dutch Edison Award and reached Gold status in the Netherlands.

The DVD was released with three audio options: 5.1 Dolby Digital; 2.0 Dolby Digital; DTS.

It was released digitally on August 26, 2021, and limited vinyl and CD editions were released on 28 April, 2023.

== Track listing ==
=== Disc 1 ===
1. "Deceiver of Fools" (Live from Lowlands)
2. "Caged" (Live from Lowlands)
3. "Mother Earth" (Live from Pukkelpop)
4. "Enter" (Live from Pukkelpop)
5. "Our Farewell" (Live from Lowlands)
6. "The Dance" (Live from Lowlands)
7. "The Promise" (Live from Rock Werchter)
8. "Dark Wings" (Live from Rock Werchter)
9. "Restless" (Live from Lowlands)
10. "Deep Within" (Live from Lowlands)
11. "Never-ending Story" (Live from Lowlands)
12. "Ice Queen" (Live from Lowlands)

Music videos:

1. "The Dance"
2. "Ice Queen"
3. "Mother Earth"

=== Disc 2 ===
Backstage A glimpse of Within Temptation backstage during the Mother Earth Tour.

The Making of:

- The Mother Earth album and the cover
- The "Mother Earth" music video

Credits

Impressions and Interviews

- TV West Westpop Interview
- Isabelle & Stenders Vroeg 3FM
- 2 Mxl "Ice Queen" (acoustic)
- TMF Awards
- Rock Werchter Veronica Special
- Face Culture Interview
- Interview at Lowlands
- Photo gallery

Extras

- Broerenkerk Zwolle
- "Ice Queen" (multi-angle version)

All versions contain an easter egg track called "Gothic Christmas".
