= Hydra World Tour =

2014–2016 concert tour by Within Temptation

- Tour by Within Temptation
- Promotional artwork of North American leg of the tour
- Location: Asia; Europe; North America; South America
- Associated album: Hydra
- Start date: 20 February 2014
- End date: 23 December 2016
- Legs: 10
- No. of shows: 136
- Attendance: 49,587 (reported)
- Box office: US$2 million (reported)

Within Temptation concert chronology
- The Unforgiving Tour (2011–2013); Hydra World Tour (2014–2016); The Resist Tour (2018–2019)

The Hydra World Tour was a concert tour by the Dutch symphonic metal band Within Temptation in support of their sixth studio album, Hydra, released by Nuclear Blast on 31 January 2014. This marked their eighth major tour and their third to take them worldwide. The tour spanned four continents and was structured into several legs, with each leg tailored to the local venues and audiences, resulting in minor setlist variations within the same leg and more significant differences between legs. A unique leg of the tour was titled "Theories on Fire," during which the band performed seated shows at theaters in the Netherlands and Luxembourg.

The tour was commercially successful and the band managed to play in even bigger spaces, an improvement already seen on their previous world tour, as well presenting their first concert at the Wembley Arena and selling out theatre tickets for their theatre seated concerts in the Netherlands. The band also managed to play at several big festivals, like Download Festival, Bloodstock Open Air, and Wacken Open Air. A live album with footage from the Amsterdam concert was released later in 2014, under the name of Let Us Burn – Elements & Hydra Live in Concert.

== Background ==
The tour was originally planned to start in January 2014, but then it was postponed to a month later, so the band could polish more the songs before releasing the album and also have more time to rehearsals for the following tour. After a period of radio and television appearances for acoustic performances and interviews, the band scheduled to embark officially on the tour. On 20 January, the band announced a try-out show for testing the songs live at the Effenaar, in Eindhoven (NL), to be held on 20 February, having the tickets sold out on the same day. The first official show happened on 26 February, in Helsinki, Finland, and the arena tour is going to pass primarily in Europe, arranging a few summer festivals. Due to great demand, several venues were changed to big ones in the purpose to comport more people. Due to the great reception of Hydra in the US, the band decided to tour again in North America, travelling from West to East coast and passing over twelve cities, being two in Canada and having some venues with sold out tickets, while on the last tour the band passed over only five cities. On 2 May, the band announced through their Facebook page that they were going to record the concert at the Heineken Music Hall, Amsterdam, in which happened on the same evening. The great part of the concert would late appear on the DVD Let Us Burn – Elements & Hydra Live in Concert together with some parts of the previous tour Elements 15th anniversary show. As the end of the European leg, the tour had an attendance of over 120.000 people. After the great reception of the previous albums on North America as well the North American leg of the Hydra World Tour, Nuclear Blast decided to release a together re-issue of both Enter and The Dance on 10 November 2014, to give the new listeners access to the band early material.

The band opted to focus on playing Hydra songs in its majority, being "Dog Days" the only one not played yet, and maintain their signature songs from previous releases, as Stand My Ground and Ice Queen, during great part of the presentations. As the album contains four invited vocalists, their part in the respective songs are played on tape as the videos are shown on the big screen, allowing these artists to appear somehow during the concerts, except for "Whole World is Watching" in which was played with guest vocalist Piotr Rogucki on Polish dates and was played only by den Adel in an acoustic version.

=== Theatre concerts ===
Right after the end of the arena concerts, the band announced via their website that on early 2015 they were going to embark on a new theatre tour passing over Dutch cities and later one extra show in Luxembourg. The special leg of the tour came out differently from their previous theatre concerts in which the band used to present primarily acoustic renditions of their songs, with the Hydra seated leg featuring only a few acoustic versions and somewhat different renditions from them. The theatre leg ambientation was made sightly different from the common concerts to also present a visual spectacle in support of the music. The band made use of holographic projections to auxiliate the stage design and effect of some songs, such as a pre-recorded virtual orchestra playing on the stage and virtual holographic duets such as the one from den Adel and Anneke van Giersbergen during the presentation of "Somewhere".

== Reception ==
We've always felt like the strange duck because at the metal festivals, we are very melodic amongst those bands, so we're strange in that direction – most heavy bands are heavier and more riff orientated. Then at mainstream festivals, we're probably the heaviest band playing and people find it strange for that reason.

— Sharon den Adel about the variety of summer festivals the band manages to play.

The tour received generally positive reviews amongst critics.

In reviewing the bands presentation at the Wembley Arena, London, Ian Gittins from The Guardian classified the performance with 3 stars out of 5. Gittins commented the diversity the band delivered during the concert, praising the transition of "the portentous Our Solemn Hour" in which sampled "a Winston Churchill speech and veers off into cod Latin" to the "melodramatic romanticism of the sultry arthouse original and bellow it from a windswept mountaintop" that the band offered with a cover of Lana Del Rey's "Summertime Sadness" during the final encore. Gittins ended his review classifying the band as a "complete hokum and yet oddly enjoyable".

British website Bring the Noise also considered "Our Solemn Hour" and the final encore containing "Summertime Sadness" as the night main highlights, also praising den Adel's vocal ability and the stage additional effects as the use of pyrotechnics, giving the concert a 10/10 score.

However, Swedish newspaper Aftonbladet cited "Summertime Sadness" as the weakest point of the concert at the Sweden Rock Festival.

Robert van Gijssel, reviewing the first Amsterdam concert for Dutch newspaper Volkskrant also gave the presentation a three out of a possible five score. van Gijssel criticized the use of video recordings on the big screen during the songs that were originally duets, commenting that it "felt like you were standing up watching a music video" and classifying it as "showstoppers". On the other hand, van Gijssel praised the "extraordinarily in shape" voice of den Adel and cited "Our Solemn Hour", "Angels" and Dutch early 2000s hit "Ice Queen" as the highlight moments of the concert.

Flemish newspaper De Morgen also criticized the use of video recordings during the Antwerp concert, naming the show as the "Disneyland of virtual duets", but giving a score of 3.5 out of a possible 5 stars and praising den Adel's "angelic voice" as well the constant band interaction with the public. Also Flemish Gazet van Antwerpen praised the performance, commenting not only about the style variation of the band but also the public, in which contained "from blushing teen girls tattooed to thirty year old Metallica-shirt men".

Metal Hammer commented more positively about the use of virtual duets on the screen, saying that it may be a low point on the concert but den Adel manages to overcome it with her performance in songs like "Fire and Ice" and also "get the crowd jumping" during "Stand My Ground" and "Ice Queen".

French newspaper Le Parisien commented positively about their passage through Paris, stating that the group delivered "a very good performance with a few remarks about", praising den Adel's vocal performance particularly during "Angels" and "Jillian (I'd Give My Heart)". On 12 September 2014, the band received the award for Best Live Band at the Metal Hammer Awards.

== Opening acts ==
- Amaranthe (North America)
- Delain (United Kingdom, Germany, France, Belgium and Netherlands dates)
- Serenity (Austria)

== Tour dates ==
Date	City	Country	Venue	Attendance	Revenue
Try-Out Show
20 February 2014	Eindhoven	Netherlands	Effenaar	—N/a	—N/a
European Leg
26 February 2014	Helsinki	Finland	Cable Factory	—N/a	—N/a
28 February 2014	Moscow	Russia	Arena	—N/a	—N/a
1 March 2014	Saint Petersburg	Russia	A2	—N/a	—N/a
4 March 2014	Vilnius	Lithuania	Teatro Arena	—N/a	—N/a
5 March 2014	Minsk	Belarus	Sporthalle	—N/a	—N/a
~~6 March 2014~~	~~Kyiv~~	~~Ukraine~~	~~Stereoplaza~~ ^{[A]}	—N/a	—N/a
8 March 2014	Poznań	Poland	Sala Ziemi	—N/a	—N/a
9 March 2014	Warsaw	Poland	Torwar Hall	—N/a	—N/a
11 March 2014	Prague	Czech Republic	Mala Sports Hala	—N/a	—N/a
12 March 2014	Bratislava	Slovakia	Incheba Expo Arena	—N/a	—N/a
14 March 2014	Budapest	Hungary	Petőfi Csarnok	—N/a	—N/a
15 March 2014	Vienna	Austria	Gasometer	—N/a	—N/a
16 March 2014	Zurich	Switzerland	Hallenstadion	3,714 / 4,500	$280,664
6 April 2014	Munich	Germany	Tonhalle	3,507 / 3,507	$163,490
7 April 2014	Hamburg	Germany	Sporthalle	2,418 / 4,000	$112,815
8 April 2014	Cologne	Germany	Palladium	3,125 / 4,000	$145,857
9 April 2014	Ludwigsburg	Germany	Arena Ludwigsburg	2,704 / 3,000	$126,696
11 April 2014	Manchester	England	O2 Apollo Manchester	—N/a	—N/a
12 April 2014	London	England	Wembley Arena	—N/a	—N/a
14 April 2014	Newcastle	England	O2 Academy Newcastle	—N/a	—N/a
15 April 2014	Glasgow	Scotland	O2 Academy Glasgow	—N/a	—N/a
16 April 2014	Birmingham	England	O2 Academy Birmingham	—N/a	—N/a
18 April 2014	Frankfurt	Germany	Jahrhunderthalle	3,701 / 4,800	$174,207
19 April 2014	Erfurt	Germany	Thüringenhalle	3,002 / 4,000	$141,493
20 April 2014	Berlin	Germany	Columbiahalle	2,899 / 3,500	$136,181
22 April 2014	Toulouse	France	Le Phare	—N/a	—N/a
24 April 2014	Lyon	France	Halle Tony Garnier	—N/a	—N/a
25 April 2014	Paris	France	Zénith de Paris	—N/a	—N/a
27 April 2014	Nantes	France	Le Zénith	—N/a	—N/a
28 April 2014	Lille	France	L'aeronef	—N/a	—N/a
29 April 2014	Antwerp	Belgium	Lotto Arena	6,940 / 6,940	$323,782
2 May 2014	Amsterdam	Netherlands	Heineken Music Hall	5,500 / 5,500	—N/a
3 May 2014	Amsterdam	Netherlands	Heineken Music Hall	—N/a	—N/a
26 June 2014	Milan	Italy	Alcatraz	—N/a	—N/a
Summer Festivals
6 June 2014	Espoo	Finland	Kivenlahti Rock	Festival	Festival
7 June 2014	Sölvesborg	Sweden	Sweden Rock Festival	Festival	Festival
12 June 2014	Copenhagen	Denmark	Copenhell	Festival	Festival
13 June 2014	Donington Park	England	Download Festival	Festival	Festival
~~14 June 2014~~	~~Weismain~~	~~Germany~~	~~Legacy Open Air~~ ^{[B]}	Festival	Festival
6 July 2014	Barcelona	Spain	Barcelona Metal Fest	Festival	Festival
18 July 2014	Dour	Belgium	Dour Festival	Festival	Festival
3 August 2014	Lokeren	Belgium	Lokersen Festival	Festival	Festival
8 August 2014	Leeuwarden	Netherlands	City Rock	Festival	Festival
9 August 2014	Hildesheim	Germany	M'era Luna Festival	Festival	Festival
14 August 2014	Avenches	Switzerland	Rock Oz'Arènes	Festival	Festival
5 September 2014	Havířov	Czech Republic	Havířov Festival	Festival	Festival
North American Leg
25 September 2014	San Francisco	United States	The Regency Ballroom	—N/a	—N/a
26 September 2014	Los Angeles	United States	Club Nokia	1,928 / 2,356	$59,278
28 September 2014	Denver	United States	Gothic Theatre	—N/a	—N/a
30 September 2014	Minneapolis	United States	First Avenue	—N/a	—N/a
1 October 2014	Chicago	United States	The Vic Theatre	1,400 / 1,400	$39,200
2 October 2014	Clarkston	United States	Royal Oak Music Theatre	—N/a	—N/a
3 October 2014	Toronto	Canada	Sound Academy	—N/a	—N/a
5 October 2014	Montreal	Canada	Métropolis	2,179 / 2,200	$57,479
7 October 2014	Baltimore	United States	Rams Head Live!	1,242 / 1,400	$37,260
9 October 2014	Philadelphia	United States	Electric Factory	—N/a	—N/a
10 October 2014	New York City	United States	Terminal 5	—N/a	—N/a
11 October 2014	Worcester	United States	Palladium	—N/a	—N/a
Fall concerts
19 October 2014	Tokyo	Japan	Loud Park Festival	Festival	Festival
~~30 October 2014~~	~~Kyiv~~	~~Ukraine~~	~~Stereoplaza~~ ^{[A]}	—N/a	—N/a
14 November 2014	Weissenhaeuser Strand	Germany	Metal Hammer Paradise	Festival	Festival
South America
20 November 2014	Mexico City	Mexico	Teatro Metropólitan	2,428 / 3,157	$173,849
21 November 2014	San Salvador	El Salvador	Cifco	—N/a	—N/a
23 November 2014	Bogotá	Colombia	Downtown Majestic	—N/a	—N/a
25 November 2014	Santiago	Chile	Teatro Caupolicán	—N/a	—N/a
26 November 2014	Buenos Aires	Argentina	Teatro Flores	—N/a	—N/a
28 November 2014	Recife	Brazil	Clube Português	—N/a	—N/a
29 November 2014	Rio de Janeiro	Brazil	Circo Voador	—N/a	—N/a
30 November 2014	São Paulo	Brazil	Audiosp	—N/a	—N/a
Theatres on Fire
28 February 2015	Almere	Netherlands	Schouwburg	—N/a	—N/a
2 March 2015	Amsterdam	Netherlands	Carré Theatre	—N/a	—N/a
5 March 2015	Luxembourg	Luxembourg	Rockhal	—N/a	—N/a
6 March 2015	Heerlen	Netherlands	Parkstad Limburg	—N/a	—N/a
7 March 2015	Arnhem	Netherlands	Musis Sacrum	—N/a	—N/a
11 March 2015	Utrecht	Netherlands	TivoliVredenburg	—N/a	—N/a
12 March 2015	Den Bosch	Netherlands	Theater a/d Parade	—N/a	—N/a
13 March 2015	Eindhoven	Netherlands	Muziekgebouw Frits Philips	—N/a	—N/a
14 March 2015	Eindhoven	Netherlands	Muziekgebouw Frits Philips	—N/a	—N/a
19 March 2015	Enschede	Netherlands	Stadschouwburg	—N/a	—N/a
20 March 2015	Nijmegen	Netherlands	De Vereeniging	—N/a	—N/a
26 March 2015	Haarlem	Netherlands	Philharmonie	—N/a	—N/a
27 March 2015	Groningen	Netherlands	Oosterpoort	—N/a	—N/a
28 March 2015	Groningen	Netherlands	Oosterpoort	—N/a	—N/a
8 April 2015	Apeldoorn	Netherlands	Orpheus	—N/a	—N/a
9 April 2015	The Hague	Netherlands	Nederlands Dans Theater	—N/a	—N/a
10 April 2015	Zwolle	Netherlands	Odeon De Spiegel	—N/a	—N/a
14 April 2015	Alphen a/d Rijn	Netherlands	Castellum	—N/a	—N/a
16 April 2015	Tilburg	Netherlands	Schouwburg	—N/a	—N/a
18 April 2015	Rotterdam	Netherlands	Nieuwe Luxor	—N/a	—N/a
21 April 2015	Steenwijk	Netherlands	De Meente	—N/a	—N/a
24 April 2015	Breda	Netherlands	Chassé	—N/a	—N/a
Summer Festivals 2
31 March 2015	Kyiv	Ukraine	Stereo Plaza	Festival	Festival
4 April 2015	Schijndel	Netherlands	Paaspop	Festival	Festival
23 May 2015	Raalte	Netherlands	Ribs 'n Blues Festival	Festival	Festival
29 May 2015	Gelsenkirchen	Germany	Rock Im Revier	Festival	Festival
31 May 2015	Munich	Germany	Rockavaria	Festival	Festival
5 June 2015	Vienna	Austria	Rock in Vienna	Festival	Festival
21 June 2015	Dessel	Belgium	Graspop Metal Meeting	Festival	Festival
26 June 2015	Piešťany	Slovakia	Topfest Festival	Festival	Festival
27 June 2015	Kavarna	Bulgaria	Kavarna Rock Fest	Festival	Festival
9 July 2015	Vizovice	Czech Republic	Masters of Rock	Festival	Festival
11 July 2015	Heerlen	Netherlands	Park City Live	Festival	Festival
24 July 2015	Kotka	Finland	Kotkan Meripäivät	Festival	Festival
25 July 2015	Pratteln	Switzerland	Z7 Summernights	Festival	Festival
30 July 2015	Kostrzyn nad Odrą	Poland	Przystanek Woodstock	Festival	Festival
31 July 2015	Wacken	Germany	Wacken Open Air	Festival	Festival
1 August 2015	Chemnitz	Germany	Wasserschloss Klaffenbach^{[C]}	3,000 / 3,000	$111,938
6 August 2015	Villena	Spain	Leyendas Del Rock	Festival	Festival
7 August 2015	Vagos	Portugal	Vagos Open Air	Festival	Festival
8 August 2015	Walton-on-Trent	England	Bloodstock Open Air	Festival	Festival
9 August 2015	Montreal	Canada	Heavy Montreal	Festival	Festival
15 August 2015	Ulft	Netherlands	Huntenpop	Festival	Festival
29 August 2015	Straszęcin	Poland	Czad Festival	Festival	Festival
Russian Leg
15 October 2015	Saint Petersburg	Russia	A2 Club	—N/a	—N/a
16 October 2015	Moscow	Russia	Crocus City Hall	—N/a	—N/a
18 October 2015	Krasnoyarsk	Russia	MVDC Sibir	—N/a	—N/a
19 October 2015	Novosibirsk	Russia	DK Zheleznodorozhnik	—N/a	—N/a
21 October 2015	Yekaterinburg	Russia	Tele-Club	—N/a	—N/a
23 October 2015	Rostov-on-Don	Russia	KSK Express	—N/a	—N/a
24 October 2015	Krasnodar	Russia	Arena Hall	—N/a	—N/a
26 October 2015	Minsk	Belarus	Minsk Sports Palace	—N/a	—N/a
Summer Festivals 3
1 May 2016	Wrocław	Poland	Gitarowemu Rekordowi Guinnessa	Festival	Festival
7 May 2016	Inzell	Germany	Mäxival	Festival	Festival
27 May 2016	Pesse	Netherlands	Muziekweekend Pesse	Festival	Festival
4 June 2016	Nijmegen	Netherlands	Fortarock	Festival	Festival
18 June 2016	Clisson	France	Hellfest Open Air	Festival	Festival
24 June 2016	Rzeszów	Poland	European Stadium of Culture	Festival	Festival
8 July 2016	Kvinesdal	Norway	Norway Rock Festival	Festival	Festival
10 July 2016	Geiselwind	Germany	Out & Loud Festival	Festival	Festival
29 July 2016	Veenhuizen	Netherlands	Veenhoop Festival	Festival	Festival
4 August 2016	Snina	Slovakia	Rock Pod Kamenom	Festival	Festival
5 August 2016	Székesfehérvár	Hungary	Fezen Festival	Festival	Festival
6 August 2016	Ostrava	Czech Republic	Ostrava v Plamenech	Festival	Festival
13 August 2016	Kortrijk	Belgium	Alcatraz Festival	Festival	Festival
14 August 2016	Hildesheim	Germany	M'era Luna Festival	Festival	Festival
20 August 2016	Spaarnwoude	Netherlands	Dutch Valley Festival	Festival	Festival
27 August 2016	Schleswig	Germany	Baltic Sea Festival	Festival	Festival
3 September 2016^{[D]}	Bucharest	Romania	Arenele BNR	—N/a	—N/a
Total^{[E]}				49,587 / 57,260	$2,084,189

- A Rescheduled to 31 March due to political problems in Ukraine.
- B Canceled due to festival management issues.
- C Open air concert with Lacrimas Profundere.
- D Extra club concert.
- E Attendance and revenue based exclusively on the reported concerts.

== Extra concerts ==
Date	City	Country	Venue	Event
24 January 2014	Los Angeles	United States	The Joint	Promotional Acoustic Sessions
27 January 2014	Woodbridge	United States	Vintage Vinyl	Promotional Acoustic Sessions
4 February 2014	London	England	HMV Oxford Street	Promotional Acoustic Sessions
18 September 2015	Berlin	Germany	Kesselhaus der Kulturbrauerei	Metal Hammer Awards
20 December 2015	Tilburg	Netherlands	013	Black Christmas
21 December 2015	Tilburg	Netherlands	013	Black Christmas
22 December 2016	Tilburg	Netherlands	013	Black Christmas
23 December 2016	Tilburg	Netherlands	013	Black Christmas

== Personnel ==
=== Within Temptation ===
- Sharon den Adel – vocals
- Ruud Jolie – lead guitar
- Stefan Helleblad – rhythm guitar
- Martijn Spierenburg – keyboards
- Jeroen van Veen – bass guitar
- Mike Coolen – drums

=== Guest musicians ===
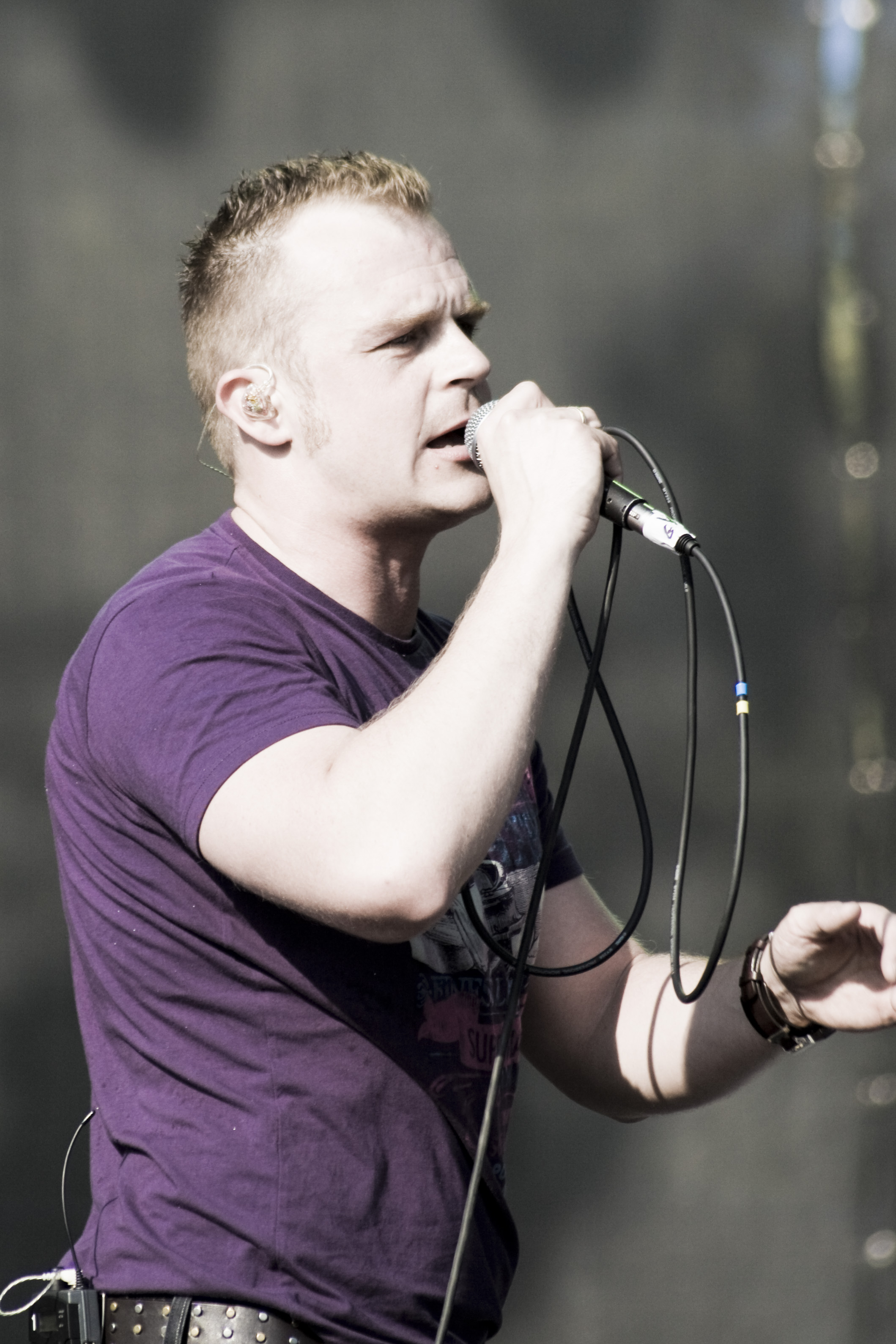
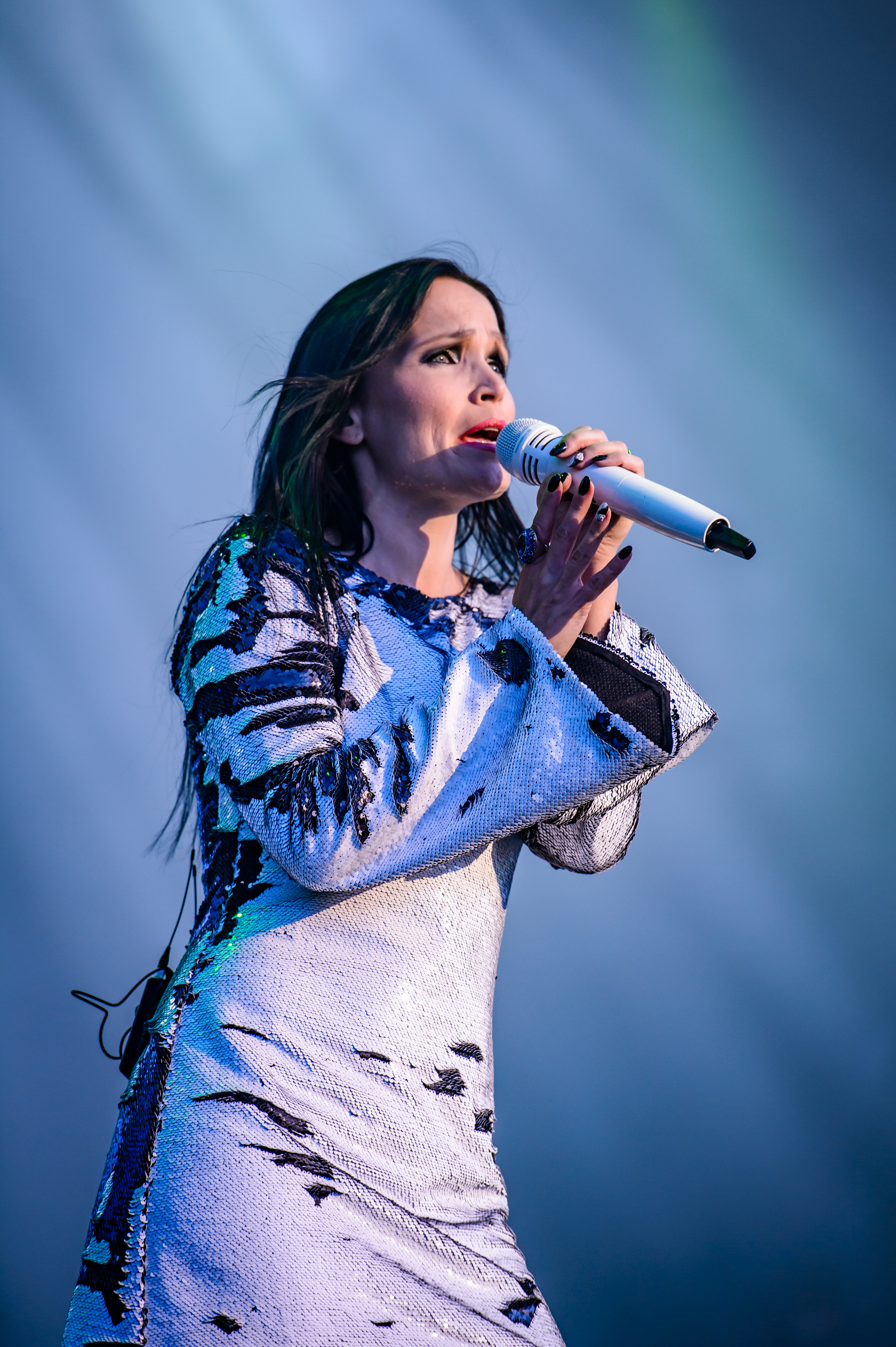
Both Piotr Rogucki (left) and Tarja Turunen (right) performed their songs on Hydra at selected dates.
- Piotr Rogucki – featured vocals on "Whole World Is Watching" on 8 and 9 March 2014, 30 July 2015 and 24 June 2016
- Robert Westerholt – growls on "Silver Moonlight" on 2 and 3 May 2014, "The Dance" on 20 and 21 December 2015 and "Candles" on 20 and 21 December 2015 and 14 August 2016
- Henrik Englund – growls on "Silver Moonlight" on 5 October 2014
- Jonas Pap – cello on 9 August 2014, 8 August 2015 and "Theatres on Fire" leg
- Camila Van Der Kooij – violins on "Theatres on Fire" leg and at Black Christmas concerts
- Ivar de Graaf – featured vocals on "Gothic Christmas" at Black Christmas concerts
- Caroline Westendorp – growls on "Silver Moonlight" on 4 June 2016
- Tarja Turunen – vocals on "Paradise (What About Us?)" on 18 June and 14 August 2016
