= Restless (Within Temptation song) =

Single by Within Temptation

from the album Enter
- B-side: "Pearls of Light"
- Released: 7 April 1997
- Genre: Gothic metal
- Length: 6:09 (album version); 4:40 (single version)
- Label: DSFA
- Songwriters: Robert Westerholt; Martijn Westerholt; Sharon den Adel

Within Temptation singles chronology
"Restless" (1997)	"Our Farewell" (2001)

"Restless" is the debut single by Dutch symphonic metal band Within Temptation. It is taken as the first and only single from their debut album Enter. Although the song was released as a single, it never entered the charts, just like their following single, "Our Farewell". There was no promotional video for the single.

== Track listing ==
CD single and U.S. iTunes Store single
No.	Title	Length
1.	"Restless" (single version)	4:41
2.	"Restless" (classical version)	5:39
3.	"Pearls of Light" (album version)	5:15
Total length:		15:35

== Versions ==
The song re-appeared as a shortened remix on the band's The Dance (EP). The single version can also be found as a bonus track on the German (2003) and UK (2004) re-releases of the album Mother Earth, while the classical version can be found on the special digipak version of the album.

== Live performance ==
Like the other songs from the album Enter, "Restless" isn't performed regularly by the band. A regular live performance can be found on the DVD and bonus CD of Mother Earth Tour. A live performance in a special acoustic setting with cello at their gig at the Beursgebouw in Eindhoven was released on DVD with Black Symphony (2008) and on CD as a B-side for the band's single "Utopia" (2009). It's also played during the Sanctuary Tour (2012).
