= Arms of Morpheus =

Studio album by Kingfisher Sky
- Released: 24 October 2014
- Length: 47:19
- Label: Suburban Records
- Producer: Ivar de Graaf, Judith Rijnveld

Kingfisher Sky chronology
| Skin of the Earth (2010) | Arms of Morpheus (2014) | Technicoloured Eyes (2018) |

Arms of Morpheus is the third studio album by the Dutch progressive metal band Kingfisher Sky. The album was released on 24 October 2014 and peaked at #31 on the Netherlands album charts the week after its release. The funding for the album was obtained via an online crowdfunding campaign, which successfully raised enough money to get the album released.

The album; befitting its name referencing Greek god of sleep and dreams Morpheus; draws on themes of sleeping, dreams, coma, insomnia and myths amongst others.

== Reception ==
Professional ratings
Review scores
| Source | Rating |
|---|---|
| Spectrum Pulse | 6/10 |
| Femme Metal Webzine | 88/100 |

Critics praised the album's broad range of musical influences and general musicianship of the band and their guests. One critic praised the folk oriented elements of the album but expressed disappointment at the perceived lack of dynamics in the vocals and a dislike of the heavier metal elements of the album, describing them as "just not clicking with this record".

== Track listing ==
| No. | Title | Length |
|---|---|---|
| 1. | "Hypnos" | 5:41 |
| 2. | "At Least You Tried" | 4:04 |
| 3. | "King of Thieves" | 3:29 |
| 4. | "Open Eyes" | 3:56 |
| 5. | "Insomnia" | 4:57 |
| 6. | "I'm Not Alone" | 3:57 |
| 7. | "Strength of the Endless" | 3:41 |
| 8. | "Heather" | 3:44 |
| 9. | "The Morrigan" | 4:01 |
| 10. | "Mercy on this Wounded Heart" | 4:35 |
| 11. | "Maddy" (Dedicated to Marina Schäefer (1977-2010); founder of Kingfisher Sky fan website Sempre Fedele) | 5:14 |

== Personnel ==
Kingfisher Sky

- Ivar de Graaf – drums, percussion, acoustic guitar (additional), bouzouki
- Judith Rijnveld – lead vocals
- Edo van der Kolk – lead guitar, acoustic guitar
- Chris Henny – rhythm guitar
- Nick Verschoor – bass guitar
- Maaike Peterse – cello
- David Gutierrez Rojas – keyboards

Guest musicians

- Kristoffer Gildenlöw – bass guitar (tracks 2, 4, 5, 6, 7 and 8)
- Ludo de Goeje – violin (tracks 1, 3, 4, 5, 7, 8, 9, 10)
- Fieke Van Den Hurk – hurdy gurdy (track 5)
- Bouke Visser – tin whistle (track 8)
- Valerio Recenti – backing vocals (track 8)

Others

- Jochem Jacobs – mixing, mastering
- Joke Rijnveld-Stortenbeek – album artwork, layout
- Richard Hilgeman – photography
