= Paradise (What About Us?) =

Single and EP by Within Temptation

EP by Within Temptation
- Released: 27 September (worldwide); 1 October (North America); 23 October (Japan)
- Recorded: July 2013
- Genre: Symphonic metal
- Length: 21:09
- Label: Sony BMG; Nuclear Blast
- Producer: Daniel Gibson

Within Temptation EPs chronology
The Howling (2007)	Paradise (What About Us?) (2013)

Within Temptation singles chronology
"Shot in the Dark" (2011)	"Paradise (What About Us?)" (2013)	"Dangerous" (2013)

"Paradise (What About Us?)" and Paradise (What About Us?) are, respectively, a single and studio EP by Dutch symphonic metal band Within Temptation from their sixth studio album Hydra. The EP was released on 27 September 2013 with three songs from the upcoming album in their demo versions and also accompanying a music video. The song features former Nightwish singer Tarja Turunen. Beside its digital release, the EP was also released as a physical CD in Japan. A new mix of the song was later released in Turunen's album The Brightest Void.

== Background ==
At the end of May 2013, the band started the process of finalization of the song vocal lines. Next month, the band went on to record the first music video for the new album. On 12 July 2013, the band released a teaser trailer of the upcoming music video, but without any names revealed. Next month, the band announced the title of the lead single, in which was called "Paradise (What About Us?)", also uploading a teaser trailer revealing some of the song lyrics and a guitar solo in anticipation for the release. During the recording process of the song, the band came to a point of confusion in which they couldn't decide how to mix it, so the song was sent to several different mixers for the band's to choose the better one. They wanted a mix that was "pumping, heavy, big and melancholic" at the same time, and to make sure that nothing was left missing on the song. According to lead vocalist Sharon den Adel, the early idea was to put "a swingy dance beat with rap in all verses" but the band disliked the result because it led to a place "a bit too much out of our comfort zone", and then they led it to a well-known territory, transforming the song into a "big symphonic, and heavy guitar cranking song."

In early August, the band started to post one picture per day of the video, or its behind the scenes, via their official Facebook account, until the official release of the video. Ideas for the music video came up in May, and den Adel was responsible for the video style and clothing. On 13 September, the band officially announced that Tarja Turunen would also appear on the song as guest vocalist. About the invitation, Turunen stated that it was "wonderful that they thought of [her]" and that she "truly appreciates the invitation and the opportunity to work with them". On working with Tarja, den Adel stated that they "immediately clicked, not only creatively but personally. [...] it felt completely natural that [they] would do this together!". According to den Adel, the song is based on the speech given by retired four-star general Peter van Uhm on 4 May 2013 (Remembrance of the Dead), which addressed the importance of not thinking only of 'yourself' or 'them', but 'us'.

== Critical reception ==
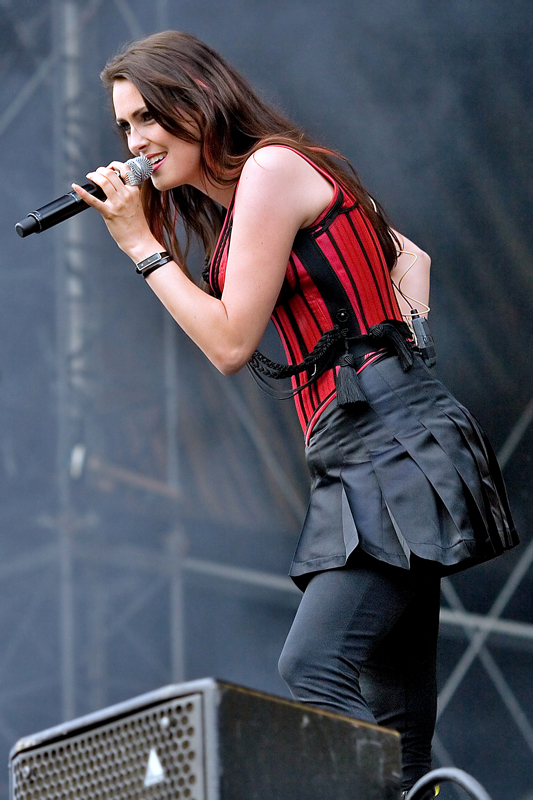
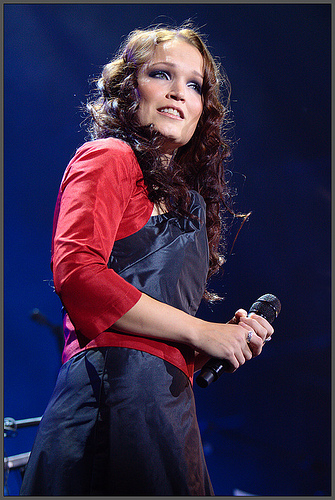
The duet between Sharon den Adel (left) and Tarja Turunen (right) was the most praised element about the release.

First review came from PlanetMosh website. Critic Simon Bower gave it a 10/10 score, praising the EP while considering the material "clever 'teasers' of what lies in store for the new album, being demo versions [...] that presumably will appear in their complete and polished state nearer the time." He also considered that the upcoming album "promises to be their most adventurous and diverse to date."

Giving it an 8/10 score, critic Rhian Westbury for Hit the Floor website praised the title song and the combination of Turunen's and den Adel's voices, commenting that the contrast of the two "brings something extra to the song making it better than if it had only featured the band’s singer". He also considered the three demo songs "as clean and built up as the opening track", praising their quality and stating that "don’t be fooled by the use of the word [demo][...], if it weren’t for moments of speech at the beginning and ends of some of them you’d never know".

British website Bring the Noise also gave the EP a positive review, giving it a 9/10 score and considering that "Within Temptation are always going to deliver what you expect from them; the style remains the same but that’s not a bad thing. The songs still manage to sound different enough, the lyrics always have feeling and the band remain one of the most talented in the symphonic metal genre".

The also British Rock n Reel gave the EP a score of 4/5, considering that the title song "has everything that a top-notch Within Temptation track needs" and commenting that the two vocalists execute "every part with perfection". Besides that, the grunt vocals on "Silver Moonlight" and the chorus of "Dog Days" were criticized but containing "potential for the album", only needing some more work. The reviewer finished adding that "the band shows just how damn good they are and how they’ve earned their place in metal history".

A less but still favorable review came from the Powerplay magazine, giving it a score of 7/10, in which praised the "superb orchestration, ethereal vocals and irresistible melodies" of the title song, but commented that the demos felt "raw and stripped back" but presenting "potential quality" for their finalized versions on the upcoming album.

The music video was selected by Kerrang as the eighth best rock video of 2014 and ninth by readers of Metal Storm.

== Music video ==
The music video for "Paradise (What About Us?)" was released via Vevo on YouTube on 26 September and the video mainly cuts between the band and images of a post-apocalyptic wasteland in consequence of a nuclear war. It is the band's first music video to surpass 100 million views on YouTube.

In the wasteland, two people are seen in heavy protective gear walking through various parts of a ruined civilization, searching for what appears to be parts of a machine. Once the parts are found, they eventually drag the pieces up a sandy slope, where they assemble and activate the machine, sending a beam of light to the skies causing rain to fall. As the wasteland begins to show some signs of life, the two characters remove their headgear, and are revealed to be two young girls.

Some time later, a rich jungle is seen as Tarja and Sharon, implied to be the two girls years later, stand in front of the machine. They leave and the red light on the machine goes out, having completed its purpose as the world is now self-sustaining.

== Track listing ==
No.	Title	Length
1.	"Paradise (What About Us?)" (featuring Tarja Turunen)	5:21
2.	"Let Us Burn" (demo version)	5:38
3.	"Silver Moonlight" (demo version)	5:14
4.	"Dog Days" (demo version)	4:56

== Personnel ==
Band members

- Sharon den Adel – vocals
- Martijn Spierenburg – keyboards
- Robert Westerholt – rhythm guitar, grunts
- Stefan Helleblad – rhythm guitar
- Ruud Jolie – lead guitar
- Jeroen van Veen – bass guitar
- Mike Coolen – drums

Guest musicians

- Tarja Turunen – vocals on track one

== Charts ==
Weekly chart performance
Chart (2013–2014)	Peak position
Finland Airplay (Radiosoittolista)	23
Finland Download (Latauslista)	13
France (SNEP)	160
Germany (GfK)	81
Japan (Oricon)	135
Netherlands (Single Top 100)	80
Switzerland (Schweizer Hitparade)	64
UK Rock & Metal (Official Charts)	6
UK Indie (Official Charts)	33
US Billboard 200	196
US Top Hard Rock Albums (Billboard)	12
