= Enter (Within Temptation album) =

Studio album by Within Temptation
- Released: 6 April 1997
- Recorded: 1997
- Studio: Studio Moskou, Utrecht, Netherlands
- Genre: Gothic metal; doom metal
- Length: 45:46
- Label: DSFA
- Producer: Lex Vogelaar; Within Temptation; Anthony van den Berg

Within Temptation chronology
Enter (1997)	Mother Earth (2000)

Singles from Enter
- 1. "Restless" Released: 7 April 1997

Professional ratings
Review scores
Source	Rating
Blabbermouth.net	7.5/10
Chronicles of Chaos	4/5 stars
Collector's Guide to Heavy Metal	7/10
Metal Hammer (GER)	6/7

Enter is the debut studio album by the Dutch symphonic metal band Within Temptation, released by DSFA Records in 1997. After the band became more widely known in foreign markets, it was re-released by the independent label Season of Mist in North America in 2007, and by Nuclear Blast in 2014. It was produced by Lex Vogelaar, founder of the Dutch death metal band Orphanage, and had to recorded, completed and mixed within three weeks.

The album prominently features lead singer Sharon den Adel's vocals as well as guitarist Robert Westerholt's gruff death metal growls. It is considered a gothic metal release with elements from doom metal, and the lyrics focus mostly on dark and supernatural themes. The track "Restless" was released as the first and only single. Although the album failed to achieve commercial success at the time of its release, it entered the Dutch Charts in 2002 after the commercial success of the band's following album.

== History ==
=== Recording ===
One week after they signed with DSFA Records, Within Temptation started recording Enter. The tracks were new versions of demo tracks. It was recorded in Studio Moskou, Utrecht, and it was completed and mixed within three weeks.

Robert Westerholt remembers that "it was incomparable to the first recordings we did earlier, this one was much more professional. After all a nice experience, but a very quick one. 'Enter' was recorded in two weeks and mixed in three days, so it was very difficult for we couldn't take time to develop songs. But it was a nice experience - it was our first album!" Vocalist Sharon den Adel recalls that "I only had one and a half days to record my parts and it was quite hectic, just a short warm-up and then 'Go'!" Lex Vogelaar, founder of the Dutch death metal band Orphanage, supplied the guitar parts for the track "Pearls of Light". Orphanage vocalist George Oosthoek performed some of the growls on "Deep Within".

==== Style ====
The album's style "sits between gothic metal and doom" and is very instrumental compared to the band's later works. Many of the songs have longer instrumental sections and fewer lyrics. On several songs Westerholt provides growling (in contrast to later albums on which it is rarely used). The lyrics focus on darkness, ghosts, and wars instead of the more common fantasy, love, and nature-centred lyrics found on later albums.

=== Release ===
Although it didn't enter the Dutch albums chart in its release year, Enter eventually rose to No. 32 in 2002, after the great success of the song "Ice Queen". The album, along with The Dance were re-released in the US on 18 September 2007 by the label Season of Mist. After the great reception of later albums and the Hydra World Tour, Nuclear Blast decided to release a together re-issue of both Enter and The Dance on 10 November 2014, in order to give the new listeners access to the band's early material. By the end of 2018, the band released the album for the first time on vinyl format. It then entered the Dutch Vinyl Charts on number 6.

== Track listing ==
No.	Title	Writer(s)	Length
1.	"Restless"	Robert Westerholt; Martijn Westerholt; Sharon den Adel	6:08
2.	"Enter"	R. Westerholt; den Adel; Richard Willemse	7:15
3.	"Pearls of Light"	R. Westerholt; den Adel; Willemse	5:15
4.	"Deep Within" (feat. George Oosthoek)	R. Westerholt; den Adel	4:30
5.	"Gatekeeper"	R. Westerholt; den Adel	6:43
6.	"Grace"	R. Westerholt; den Adel	5:10
7.	"Blooded" (Instrumental)	R. Westerholt	3:38
8.	"Candles"	R. Westerholt; den Adel	7:07
Total length:			45:46

Japanese edition bonus track
No.	Title	Length
9.	"Restless" (Classical version)	5:39
Total length:		51:25

The 2022 Limited Numbered Edition also includes the EP The Dance in its entirety before "Restless (classical version)".

== Personnel ==
=== Within Temptation ===
- Sharon den Adel – lead vocals
- Robert Westerholt – rhythm guitar, unclean vocals
- Michiel Papenhove – lead guitar
- Martijn Westerholt – keyboards
- Jeroen van Veen – bass
- Ivar de Graaf – drums

=== Additional musicians ===
- George Oosthoek – vocals on "Deep Within"
- Lex Vogelaar – guitars on "Pearls of Light"
- Guus Eikens – synthesizers/sound advice

=== Production ===
- Lex Vogelaar – producer, mixing
- Sylvia Vermulen – engineer
- Oscar Holleman – mixing
- Anthony van den Berg – executive producer

== Charts ==
Chart (2002)	Peak position
Dutch Albums (Album Top 100)	32
