= My Favorite Scar =

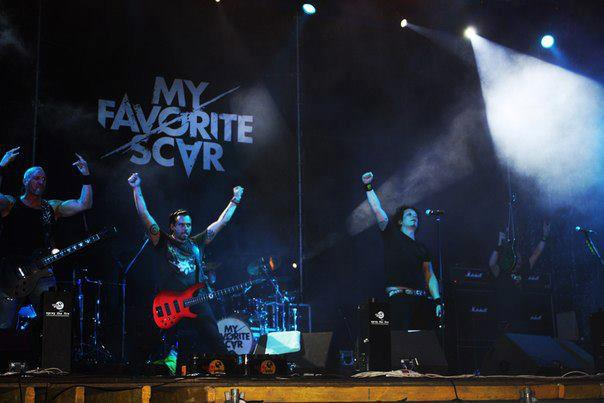
- My Favorite Scar performing at Krock u maibutne festival, Kherson in August 2012.

Background information
- Origin: Waalwijk, Netherlands
- Genres: Dark rock, Industrial rock
- Years active: 2008–2014
- Label: Universal Music
- Members: Jeroen van Riet; Daan Janzing; Eef van Riet; Patrick de Kok; Roel van Helden
- Past members: Stephen van Haestregt
- Website: www.myfavoritescar.com

My Favorite Scar was a Dutch dark rock band formed in 2008 by brothers Jeroen "Jay" (vocals) and Eef "Evan" van Riet (guitar), Patrick "Pat" de Kok (bass guitar) and Daan "Dan" Janzing (guitar).

The band disbanded in 2014 due to a lack of success.

== History ==
When Evan, Pat and Jay played in Feeler, they met producer Oscar Holleman (Within Temptation, Krezip, Gorefest, After Forever). He was interested in what they were doing, but the material was so different and not fitting for Feeler, that they decided to quit Feeler and dissolve that band – and go ahead with My Favorite Scar instead. Daan (ex-Kingfisher Sky) joined the new band in a month and Stephen (ex-Within Temptation, ex-Orphanage) joined within a year after that.

My Favorite Scar supported such bands as Kiss, Megadeth, Disturbed and Epica. In 2009, the band played at the Global East Festival in Ukraine.

After two years of recording, on 6 August 2010, MFS realised the self-titled debut album My Favorite Scar via Universal. It received splendid reviews in both national and international magazines and webzines. Interviews with the band appeared in all the big magazines in the Netherlands. The single "Kingsize" got plays on national radio and was put on heavy rotation on MTV. The debut album entered the Dutch Album Charts at № 29 in the first week. The new single "This Poison Love" that was written with Ben Moody (ex-Evanescence and We Are The Fallen) was set for release on 22 October 2010.

Prior to the release of the album, the band released first EP, with songs "Waste", "Burn Down" and "No Love Lost". The album was well received in the press, including Album of the Month in Aardschok Magazine. There are guest vocal contributions by Rachel Kramer, Collette Schiphorst (Good Things End) and Jan-Chris de Koeijer (Gorefest).

After touring key summer festivals, My Favorite Scar started their fall tour in September 2010. Besides Dutch club stages, this tour included (inter)national support slots with US rock band Alter Bridge in Antwerp, Berlin and Amsterdam.

On 31 August 2012 the band headlined the first day of the Ukrainian international rock festival Krok u maibutne (English: Step to the future).

My Favorite Scar has started writing their second album, with release planned for spring 2013.

In December 2012, Stephen van Haestregt and My Favorite Scar decided to split ways.

In May 2014, My Favorite Scar disbanded, because of the lack of success.

== Members ==
Last known line-up

- Jeroen van Riet – Lead Vocals
- Eef van Riet – Lead Guitar
- Daan Janzing – Rhythm Guitar
- Patrick de Kok – Bass Guitar
- Roel van Helden - Drums

Former members

- Stephen van Haestregt - Drums (2008–2012)

== Discography ==
Studio albums

Album	Release date	Highest ranking top 100	Label	Certifications
My Favorite Scar	6 August 2010	№ 29	Universal Music	

EP's

- "The Waste EP"
