= Stephen van Haestregt =

Dutch drummer (born 1972)

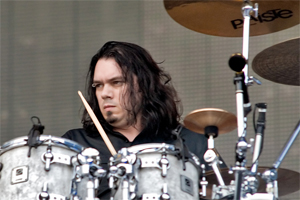

Background information
- Born: 12 September 1972 (age 54); Westdorpe, Netherlands
- Occupation: Musician
- Instruments: Drums, Percussion
- Years active: 1988 -present
- Website: Within Temptation Official

Stephen van Haestregt (born 12 September 1972 in Westdorpe) is a Dutch drummer, best known as the drummer of the Dutch symphonic metal band Within Temptation until his departure in 2010.

During the mid-late 1990s, Van Haestregt was drummer with Dutch cajun band The Acadian Ramblers, later known as Acadia, before moving onto Sacrament, after which he joined Paralysis. In 2000 he worked with Within Temptation, as sound engineer of their album Mother Earth. When the band's drummer, Ivar de Graaf, left in 2002, he joined them and five days later made his first performance with the band on the German festival Rock im Park. Stephen has performed on Arjen Anthony Lucassen's album Fate of a Dreamer, under the Ambeon moniker, and has also produced several albums such as The Rebel in You by Yellow Pearl.

Also Stephen produced several albums, such as Middles EP and Tsumi from the Dutch nu metal band Dreadlock Pussy.

On 30 March 2010 Stephen announced via Within Temptation's official website that he would be leaving the band after the Theatre Tour planned for April in order to concentrate on his new band My Favorite Scar.

A press release was announced by the band My Favorite Scar on 18 December 2012 stating that Stephen Van Haestregt was leaving the band. It was also in the press release that "Stephen would continue his work as a drummer and producer at Swampmusic Studio."
