= Our Farewell =

2001 single by Within Temptation

Single by Within Temptation

from the album Mother Earth
- B-side: "Dark Wings"
- Released: 22 January 2001
- Recorded: 2000
- Genre: Symphonic rock; folk rock
- Length: 5:18 (album version); 3:55 (radio edit)
- Label: DSFA
- Songwriters: Robert Westerholt; Sharon den Adel
- Producer: Oscar Holleman

Within Temptation singles chronology
"Restless" (1997)	"Our Farewell" (2001)	"Ice Queen" (2001)

"Our Farewell" is the first single by Dutch symphonic metal band Within Temptation from their second studio album Mother Earth. Although the song was released as a single, it never entered the charts, just like their previous single, "Restless". There was also no promotional video made for the single.

A live recording of the song is on the Mother Earth Tour DVD, in which the song is performed as a duet with Dutch opera singer Gea Gijsbertsen, who also conducted the choirs for Within Temptation's special gig at the Broerenkerk, Zwolle during the Mother Earth Tour.

After the release of the album The Silent Force, the song was still played live at some concerts, during the Sanctuary Tour (2012), and during their 15 years birthday live, Elements.

This song has been, among two of Van Canto's songs ("Water, Fire, Heaven, Earth" and "Hearted", both from the band's 2010 studio album Tribe of Force), the inspiration for "Forevermore", a song by the Dutch symphonic metal band Epica, featuring the mild-autistic Ruurd Woltring. The recording of this song was made possible thanks to the Dutch TV-show Niks te gek! (Nothing too crazy), in which mentally disabled people get their wishes granted.

== Track listing ==
CD single and U.S. iTunes Store EP
No.	Title	Length
1.	"Our Farewell" (radio edit)	3:55
2.	"Dark Wings" (album version)	4:16
3.	"Our Farewell" (album version)	5:18
4.	"Our Farewell" (acoustic version)	5:20
Total length:		18:49
