= Kingfisher Sky =

Dutch band

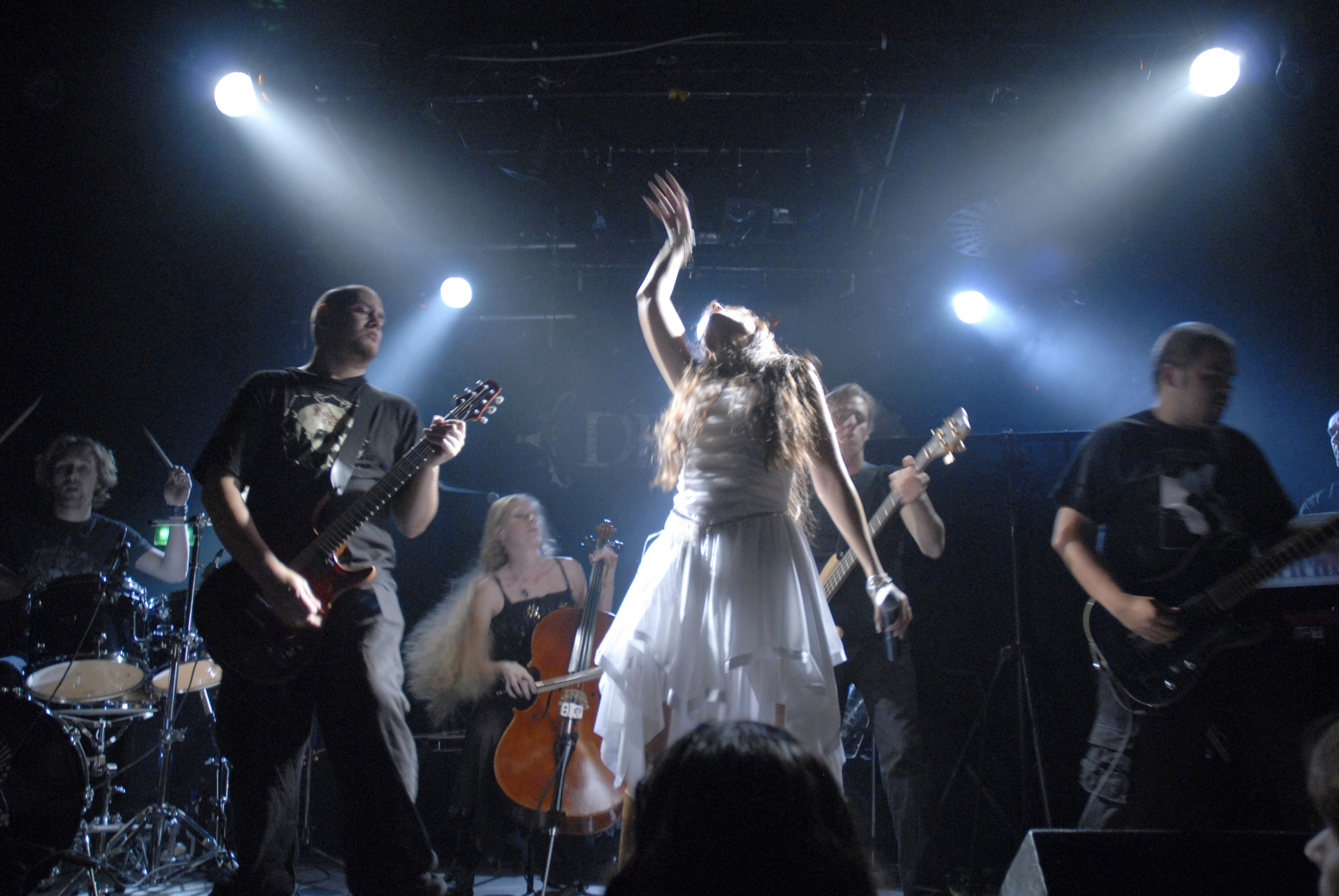
- Kingfisher Sky live in Groningen

Background information
- Also known as: Jambone (2001–2004)
- Origin: The Hague, Netherlands
- Genres: Progressive metal, progressive rock, symphonic metal
- Years active: 2001–present
- Labels: Suburban Records / Tonefloat / Laser's Edge / Union Disk
- Members: Judith Rijnveld; Edo Van Der Kolk; Maaike Peterse; Erik van Ittersum; Nick Verschoor; Ivar de Graaf
- Past members: Michiel Parqui; Zelda Weski; Eric Hoogendoorn; Daan Janzing; René Merkelbach; George van Olffen; David Gutierrez Rojas; Chris Henny
- Website: www.kingfishersky.nl

Kingfisher Sky is a Dutch progressive metal band from the Netherlands, created and led by drummer Ivar de Graaf.

== History ==
The history of Kingfisher Sky started in 2001, after drummer Ivar de Graaf left Within Temptation, to pursue his own musical interests, and founded Jambone, with the idea to cover classic rock bands. The band featured Edo Van Der Kolk on lead guitar and Michiel Parqui on bass guitar. Edo had already known Ivar for fifteen years and the trio had been playing together since high school, experimenting with various styles of music. They found a lead vocalist in the classically trained singer Judith Rijnveld and, when Zelda Weski joined as backing vocalist, the line-up was completed. Too widespread are the musical influences of Ivar and together with Judith as the songwriter they explored a way to combine their compositions into songs that did not bound themselves to a specified genre or were not tied to a particular single style, with the two female voices giving soul and melody to contrast the heavy groove-oriented music.

The band released a 5-track demo in January 2002, but Michiel and Zelda left in October 2003 and Edo took a hiatus. One year later, Ivar decided to change the name to Kingfisher Sky and the duo started recording songs in their home studio in 2005. At an early stage, Eric Hoogendoorn was chosen as the permanent bassist and guitarist Daan Janzing, who was introduced by Ruud Jollie, was recruited next. George van Olffen on keyboards followed soon after. This resulted in a demo containing 11 tracks in October 2006 and a record deal with Suburban Records was signed in the same year. Edo appeared on the demo as a guest musician, playing a guitar solo on the demo version of "Through My Eyes", before returning full-time in 2007, completing the band for the time being.

In June 2007 they recorded their first album, produced by Jochem Jacobs and Bouke Visser, in various studios under the inspiring leadership of the producer duo. Hallway of Dreams was released in October of the same year and received with great reviews and, since then, the band has completed numerous shows as support for related bands such as Delain and Epica with a successful headline tour throughout the Netherlands followed. Within the scope of a special show in their hometown, Kingfisher Sky was joined by classical cellist Maaike Peterse, who played along on "Big Fish". As this cooperation proved to be very successful, Maaike soon became the seventh band member. In March 2008, Laser's Edge Records released Hallway of Dreams in the United States. Japan followed in 2008. It was also released on Vinyl by Tonefloat Records. Hallway of Dreams later became available in the United Kingdom, Italy, France and Germany.

George van Olffen left the band in July 2009 to pursue other musical interests. With René Merkelbach the band found a new keyboardist, until David Gutierrez Rojas joined in November 2010. In April 2010, the band announced that guitarist Daan Janzing was about to leave Kingfisher Sky in order to fully concentrate on his other band My Favorite Scar. Chris Henny later joined as the new guitarist. Kingfisher Sky released their second album Skin of The Earth on 23 September 2010.

In May 2014 Eric Hoogendoorn left Kingfisher Sky and he was replaced by Nick Verschoor. After a successful crowdfunding campaign the money was raised to start recording their third album, Arms of Morpheus, which was released in October 2014. The album features Kristoffer Gildenlöw on bass on several tracks. In the beginning of 2016, keyboard player David Guiterrez Rojaz left the band to pursue other interests. He was replaced with Erik van Ittersum. A few months later, guitarist Chris Henny also parted ways with the band.

== Style ==
Ivar's progressive rock and traditional folk music influences collided with Judith's classical conservatory background, and also her preference for soul. Combined with their mutual love for bands and artists, like Aretha Franklin, Porcupine Tree, Jethro Tull, Peter Gabriel, Kate Bush, Tori Amos, Cecilia Bartoli, Mother's Finest, King's X, Skunk Anansie, Anouk, Heart, Clannad, Mike Oldfield and Pink Floyd, new songs were written.

== Band members ==
Current

- Ivar de Graaf – drums, additional guitars and keyboards (2001–present)
- Judith Rijnveld – lead vocals (2001–present)
- Edo Van Der Kolk – lead guitar (2001–2003, 2007–present)
- Maaike Peterse – cello (2008–present)
- Nick Verschoor – bass guitar and double bass (2014–present)
- Erik van Ittersum – keyboards (2016–present)

Former

- Michiel Parqui – bass guitar (2001–2003)
- Zelda Weski – backing vocals (2001–2003)
- George van Olffen – keyboards (2006–2009)
- Daan Janzing – lead and rhythm guitars (2006–2010)
- Eric Hoogendoorn – bass guitar (2006–2014)
- René Merkelbach – keyboards (2009–2010)
- David Gutierrez Rojas – keyboards (2010–2016)
- Chris Henny – rhythm guitar (2010–2016)

Timeline

== Discography ==
Studio albums

- 2007: Hallway of Dreams
- 2010: Skin of the Earth
- 2014: Arms of Morpheus
- 2018: Technicoloured Eyes
- 2024: Feeding the Wolves

Singles and EPs

- 2007: Hallway of Dreams
- 2008: November
- 2014: King of Thieves
- 2017: To Turn the Tables
- 2018: Cornelia
- 2021: Rise
- 2022: Walk the Plank
