= Jokke Sommer =

Norwegian skydiver

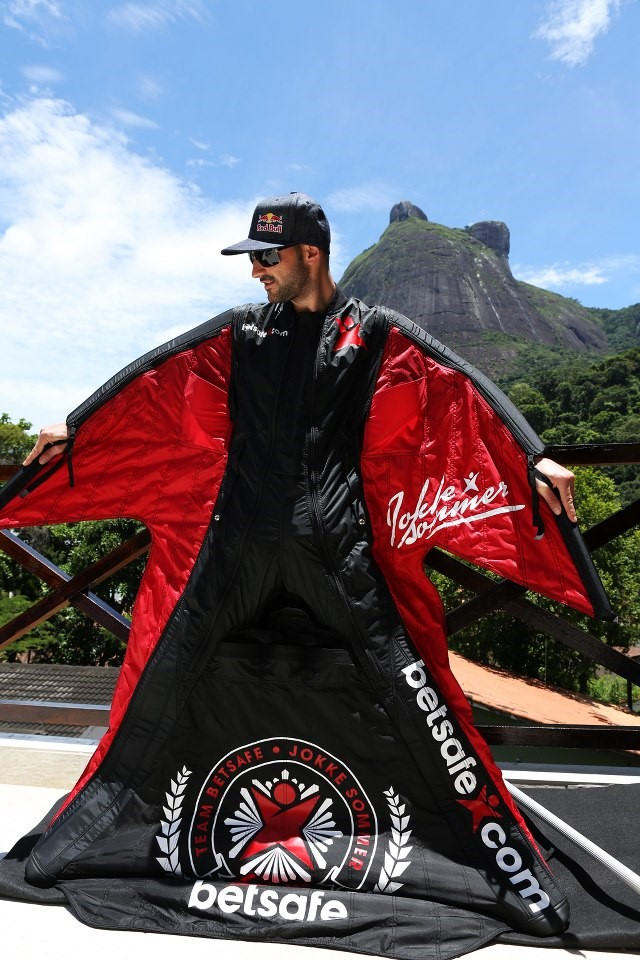
Jokke Sommer

Jokke Sommer (born 6 June 1986, in Oslo) is a Norwegian professional skydiver and BASE jumper. In Norway, Sommer started BASE jumping in 2008. He uploaded his first video to YouTube called Wingsuit Base in Romsdalen, Norway where he jumps from huge cliffs in Norway. This video was seen by over 17,000 people.

== Childhood ==
Jokke Sommer began skydiving in 2007. After selling his dirtbikes in order to gather the funds required for the training, he started a skydiving formation in USA, where he executed more than 200 jumps within 2 months.

== Videos ==
=== Dream Lines ===
In 2010, Sommer launched a movie called Dream Lines - Part I where he flies near the cliffs and mountains all over the world.

He launched four episodes of Dream Lines including Dream Lines - Part III that reached more than 10 million views on YouTube and Dream Lines IV which exceeded four million views. In this last, a teaser was dropped one month before the original launch, 14 December 2012, where we can see the different lines that Sommer and his cameraman, Ludovic Woerth, flew during 2012.

=== The Perfect Flight ===
In 2013, Sommer appeared in a web series called The Perfect Flight, produced by Epic TV where he performed stunts with the late Ludovic Woerth (who filmed the flights thanks to cameras attached to his helmet), and Espen Fadnes.

In the first episode, they went to Rio in Brazil and fly near Christ the Redeemer. In the second one, the three friends tried to fly under the bridge of Aiguille du Midi, located in the French Alps. Then, they fly between the Tianmen mountains in China, where Espen Fadnes narrowly escaped collision with a cable car. They jumped over Piton des Neiges in the mountains of the Reunion Island in the fourth episode.

=== Free by Rudimental and Emeli Sandé ===
In 2013, Sommer featured in a music video for a song by Rudimental and Emeli Sandé, titled "Free." Sommer uses a wingsuit and glides over the Eiger mountains in the Alps, in this video it shows his childhood. It presents him as a young child getting bullied, but soon meeting an old man releasing an eagle to fly. He became inspired by it thinking he could fly just like it.

=== Dangerous by Within Temptation ===
Sommer appeared in the music video for the song Dangerous by Dutch symphonic metal band Within Temptation featuring Howard Jones, formerly of Killswitch Engage. The video shows Sommer gliding through the air and performing stunts such as navigating through a narrow gap between two buildings.

== Trivia ==
He claims to be afraid of heights, as recounted in an interview he did with Red Bull before wingsuiting from Norway's Troll wall.
