= Mother Earth (Within Temptation album) =

Studio album by Within Temptation
- Released: 24 December 2000
- Recorded: June–August 2000
- Studio: Studio RS29, Waalwijk, Netherlands
- Genre: Symphonic metal; Celtic metal
- Length: 53:49
- Label: DSFA
- Producer: Oscar Holleman; Anthony van den Berg

Within Temptation chronology
Enter (1997)	Mother Earth (2000)	The Silent Force (2004)

Singles from Mother Earth
- 1. "Our Farewell" Released: 22 January 2001; 2. "Ice Queen" Released: June 2001; 3. "Mother Earth" Released: 2003

Reissue cover
- UK 2007 and US 2008 releases

Mother Earth is the second studio album by the Dutch symphonic metal band Within Temptation. Originally released on 24 December 2000 in the Netherlands, and 21 August 2001 in other parts of Europe. The album was licensed to be released in Germany and neighboring countries through GUN Records in January 2003 as a special extended edition with four bonus tracks. The same edition reached the United Kingdom through Sanctuary Records with a release in September 2004. The album was re-released by Roadrunner Records on 28 September 2007, with bonus live tracks. On 5 August 2008, Mother Earth along with The Silent Force was released in the United States on Roadrunner Records. On 17 December 2018, it was announced that the album would be rereleased on vinyl in January 2019.

The album features mainly fantasy and nature themes and was a sleeper hit in the band's heartland, entering the Dutch charts at number eighty-two, by the end of 2000, and only managing to reach its peak third position two years later with the second release of the single Ice Queen. The album later reached double platinum status in the Netherlands, platinum in Germany, and gold in Belgium. As of 2011, the album had reportedly sold 800,000 copies.

== Recording ==
By 1999 the band had built their own studio and had begun recording demos for the Mother Earth album there. The album itself was recorded in Studio RS29 in Waalwijk, the Netherlands. Oscar Holleman, who had produced and engineered The Dance, was again producer and one of the sound engineers was Stephen van Haestregt, future drummer for the band. Sharon recalls that "I had a day for each song, which is still not very much, but you can try out things. We also did some demos before the recordings, so there you can check if you like or dislike parts of a song, and so you have more time when it comes to recording". Ayreon's Arjen Lucassen provided the guitar solo for the track "Dark Wings".

== Music style ==
Within Temptation's "Mother Earth" (2000)
Rapid orchestral strings move to the forefront on the chorus of this title track from Within Temptation's second album Mother Earth.

The sound of Mother Earth was a departure for the band. According to Robert Westerholt, the album was a natural progression of their first album Enter, as the band didn't want to release the same kind of music twice. As a result, they opted to make the songs on a faster tempo and change the tone of the lyrics. In a 2008 interview with Faceculture, den Adel states that Mother Earth was "a little bit older, a little bit more knowledgeable about how we wanted to sound, even then, of course you grow, so we had a better picture of how we wanted to sound. We didn't want to have the grunt vocals anymore. We felt like everyone was using that as a gimmick, and we didn't want to have it in our music anymore because of that...and also we were very much enthralled by a movie at that time, Braveheart, which was very Celtic, and that's how our album became very Celtic because we were so in love with the soundtrack of the Braveheart movie. So inspired by that, the album came out that way...I still love that album very much...it came together in a very natural way. The songs were sometimes written in a day, it did take time to work it out more, the way it sounded in the end, but it was like the ideas and the whole concepts of certain songs were written mostly in one day, the chorus and the verses."

According to Metal Injection, the album critical and commercial success can be attributed to the combination of its musical ambiance and the imagery the band presented at that time, citing the landscapes from the Mother Earth music video as an example of the great blend between their musical style and visual presentation. Louder Sound also pointed the bombastic and cinematic characteristics present on the album, highlighting the use of synthesizers and strings. Dutch newspaper NRC Handelsblad pointed the visual aspect of the concerts at that time as another contributing factor to the growing popularity of the band, as the stage decoration, the band members outfits and the use of pyrotechnics suited well the epic aspect of their sound and lyrics.

== Reception ==
Professional ratings
Review scores
Source	Rating
AllMusic	4.5/5 stars
Chronicles of Chaos	3.5/5 stars
Metal Hammer (Ger)	5/7
Rock Hard	7.5/10
Sea of Tranquility	(remastered)

The album, which was considered the band's breakthrough, received positive reviews particularly around Europe. AllMusic rated the album 4 1/2 stars, the reviewer calling it "easily one of the best releases of 2001", and praising it for its "mature and confident sound" and Sharon den Adel's "elusive and intangible presence", adding "The rise of goth/prog metal seemed to reach a peak at the turn of the century, with an endless supply of bands offering their own spin on the subgenre. Only a handful of these bands seem to have anything interesting or unique to offer... With the release of Mother Earth, there was little doubt that the cream of the crop had indeed risen to the top... A landmark release that set new standards for creativity, musicianship, and taste – not just for goth/prog metal, but for any style of music." German magazine Rock Hard awarded the album a score of 7.5 out of 10 and considered it an improvement over their debut album, Enter, praising den Adel's vocals and the catchiness of the songs, locating the album between pop music and gothic metal. Chris Flaaten, from heavy metal webzine Chronicles of Chaos, also pointed the renewal the band showed in the album in comparison to their debut, and gave the album a positive score of 7 out of 10. The reviewer praised the instrumentals and how it was managed well in what refers to establishing the fantasy-like setting the album presents. However, he considered that while the band had gotten "more epic", they also got "more mellow", citing the "easy listening" aspect as a weakness for those who seek intensity on the metal genre.

=== Accolades ===
Publication	List	Rank	Ref.
Metal Hammer	20 Best Albums of 2000	—N/a	

== Commercial performance ==
When first released, by the end of the year 2000, the album entered the charts only in the band's home country at position eighty-two, peaking at position sixty-seven at the beginning of 2001 before falling off the charts. Two singles were released that year, the first for the track "Our Farewell", which failed to enter any charts, and the second for the track "Ice Queen", which debuted at position seventy-three in June 2001 and disappeared from the Dutch charts right after. With the release of a second version of the single due to a better elaborated music video, the song started climbing the Dutch and Belgian charts, resulting on a new sales boost for the album, which quickly re-entered the charts and ended up peaking at the third position on both countries in 2002. As a result, from the intense airplay of the music video on Dutch music TV channel The Box, mainstream radio stations opted for also playing the song despite it being too heavy for their audiences. Over the course of that year, the album reached platinum status in the Netherlands, with sales in excess of 80,000 copies, and gold status in Belgium, with sales in excess of 25,000 copies. With the album receiving distribution in new European countries by the beginning of 2003, it also managed to enter the German, Swiss and Austrian charts. In Germany, the album peaked at number 7 and was later certified platinum on the country, with sales in excess of 200,000 copies. By the beginning of 2004, the album also entered the Norwegian charts at number seventeen, peaking at number eleven three weeks later. In 2021, two decades after its release, the album reached a second platinum status in the Netherlands, totaling 160,000 copies sold in the band's home country.

== Track listing ==
All lyrics are written by Sharon den Adel, except where noted; all music is composed by Robert Westerholt, except where noted.

No.	Title	Length
1.	"Mother Earth" (music: R. Westerholt, Guus Eikens)	5:29
2.	"Ice Queen"	5:20
3.	"Our Farewell"	5:18
4.	"Caged"	5:47
5.	"The Promise"	8:00
6.	"Never-ending Story" (music: Oscar Holleman, René Merkelbach)	4:02
7.	"Deceiver of Fools"	7:35
8.	"Intro" (Instrumental; music: Merkelbach)	1:06
9.	"Dark Wings"	4:14
10.	"In Perfect Harmony" (music: Gerarda Matheeuwsen, Holleman, Merkelbach)	6:58
Total length:		53:49

2000 limited edition bonus track
No.	Title	Length
11.	"World of Make Believe" (Unreleased track)	4:45
Total length:		58:34

2003 German special extended edition
No.	Title	Length
11.	"Deep Within" (Live at Lowlands, Biddinghuizen, 2002)	4:21
12.	"The Dance" (Live at Lowlands, Biddinghuizen, 2002)	5:12
13.	"Restless" (Single version)	4:41
14.	"Bittersweet" (Unreleased track; lyrics: den Adel, R. Westerholt; music: Martijn Spierenburg, den Adel)	3:21
Total length:		72:21

2003 German standard edition
No.	Title	Length
11.	"Restless" (Single version)	4:43
12.	"Bittersweet" (Unreleased track; lyrics: den Adel, R. Westerholt; music: Spierenburg, den Adel)	3:21
13.	"Enter" (Live at Utrecht, 1998; music: R. Westerholt, Richard Willemse)	6:39
14.	"The Dance" (Live at Utrecht, 1998)	4:53
Total length:		73:25

Roadrunner Records 2007 UK and 2008 US editions bonus tracks
No.	Title	Length
11.	"Deceiver of Fools" (Live at Java-eiland, Amsterdam, July 22, 2005)	7:25
12.	"Caged" (Live at Java-eiland, Amsterdam, July 22, 2005)	4:45
13.	"Candles" (Live at Java-eiland, Amsterdam, July 22, 2005)	6:59
14.	"Ice Queen" (Live at Java-eiland, Amsterdam, July 22, 2005)	5:10
Total length:		78:08

2022 expanded edition bonus tracks
No.	Title	Length
11.	"World of Make Believe"	4:52
12.	"Bittersweet"	3:20
13.	"Jane Doe"	4:30
Total length:		66:28

== Personnel ==
=== Within Temptation ===
- Sharon den Adel – vocals
- Robert Westerholt – rhythm guitar, vocals on "Mother Earth", spoken words on "The Promise", growls on "Jane Doe"
- Michiel Papenhove – lead guitar
- Jeroen van Veen – bass
- Martijn Westerholt – keyboards
- Ivar de Graaf – drums

=== Additional musicians ===
- Arjen Lucassen – guitar solo on the track "Dark Wings"
- Rene Dissel – fretless bass on the track "Never-ending Story"
- Guus Eikens – synthesizer, co-arrangements on "Mother Earth" and "The Promise"
- René Merkelbach – additional keyboards, orchestral arrangements
- Caspar De Jonge, Hans Cassa, Melissa 't Hart, Yvonne Rooda – choir

=== Production ===
- Oscar Holleman – producer, engineer, mixing, mastering
- Stephen van Haestregt – engineer
- Anthony van den Berg – executive producer

== Charts ==
=== Weekly charts ===
Chart (2000–2003)	Peak position
Austrian Albums (Ö3 Austria)	30
Belgian Albums (Ultratop Flanders)	3
Dutch Albums (Album Top 100)	3
German Albums (Offizielle Top 100)	7
Norwegian Albums (VG-lista)	11
Swiss Albums (Schweizer Hitparade)	70
Chart (2004)	Peak position
Belgian Albums (Ultratop Flanders)	84
UK Independent Albums (Official Charts)	22
UK Rock & Metal Albums (Official Charts)	20
Chart (2005)	Peak position
Belgian Albums (Ultratop Flanders)	99

=== Year-end charts ===
Chart (2002)	Position
Belgian Albums (Ultratop Flanders)	19
Dutch Albums (MegaCharts)	9
Chart (2003)	Position
German Albums (Offizielle Top 100)	48

== Certifications and sales ==
Region	Certification	Certified units/sales
Belgium (BRMA)	Gold	25,000^{*}
Germany (BVMI)	Gold	150,000^{^}
Netherlands (NVPI)	2× Platinum	160,000^{^}
^{*} Sales figures based on certification alone.^{^} Shipments figures based on certification alone.
