= And We Run =

Single by Within Temptation featuring Xzibit

from the album Hydra
- B-side: "Living on Fire"; "One of These Days"; "Keep on Breathing"
- Released: 23 May 2014 (Europe): 26 May 2014 (United Kingdom); 27 May 2014 (US); 20 August 2014 (Japan)
- Recorded: 2013
- Length: 3:50
- Label: BMG; Nuclear Blast
- Songwriters: Sharon den Adel; Robert Westerholt; Alvin Joiner
- Producer: Daniel Gibson

Within Temptation singles chronology
"'Whole World Is Watching'" (2014)	"And We Run" (2014)	"'The Reckoning'" (2018)

"And We Run" is a studio EP and single by Dutch symphonic metal band Within Temptation from their sixth studio album Hydra which features American rapper Xzibit. It was released on May 23, 2014, containing three demos from the album and different versions of the title song. The music video was released on the same day.

== Background ==
The idea of putting rap verses on the song came from guitarist Robert Westerholt, who personally enjoys the genre. Xzibit came to the group's mind due to the fact that he was already featured on crossover works with metal bands such as Korn and Alice Cooper, plus Westerholt desired to have a rapper with deep vocals to contrast den Adel's melodic vocals. The band's management disagreed with the idea of the inclusion of a rapper at first, fearing a career drop for the band. Xzibit himself commented that he was surprised by the invitation, and had to check out the band's previous works, having had no prior knowledge of them. When Xzibit heard the demo for the song, he accepted the request. The rap verses were written by Xzibit himself, as the band wanted them to be original and coming from the rapper's perspective. The collaboration was met with high criticism initially, as it appeared to deviate far from the band's original musical style, but then the song received unexpected praise after release. According to band member Ruud Jolie, the song received negative criticism even before its release due to the collaboration. After the release, although, he noted some positive change of opinion. Otherwise, den Adel found that the opinions about the song were polarized.

== Music video ==
The music video was uploaded to the band's official YouTube channel on May 23, 2014. The video opens with a Nelson Mandela quote that reads: "Let freedom reign. The sun shall never set on so glorious a human achievement". Xzibit is seen bound to a chair with tubes inserted into his skin, inside a dark industrial area, which is filmed in black and white. The band are shown performing somewhere outside in a floating, colorful world that resembles ruins. A hummingbird flies past the band and towards the industrial area where Xzibit is being held. It lands in Xzibit's hand, and he looks at it before one of the tubes attaches to the bird, absorbing its color and killing it. Xzibit breaks out of the chair and leaps out of the building. In between scenes of him escaping and the band playing, he is shown rapping in a black room. He approaches a giant wall and punches his way through it, and as it breaks the sunlight pours through and shines on him, filling the area around him with color. He feels the sunlight, and so does den Adel, and it is implied that they will find each other once Xzibit escapes.

== Track listing ==
Regular track listing

No.	Title	Length
1.	"And We Run (radio edit)" (featuring Xzibit)	2:51
2.	"And We Run (album version)" (featuring Xzibit)	3:50
3.	"And We Run (dance remix)" (featuring Xzibit)	3:00
4.	"Living on Fire" (demo version)	2:43
Total length:		12:24

Extended track listing
No.	Title	Length
5.	"Keep on Breathing" (demo version)	3:02
6.	"One of These Days" (demo version)	2:31
Total length:		17:57

Japanese track listing
No.	Title	Length
1.	"And We Run (radio edit)" (featuring Xzibit)	2:51
2.	"And We Run (dance remix)" (featuring Xzibit)	3:00
3.	"Whole World Is Watching" (featuring Dave Pirner)	4:00
4.	"Keep on Breathing" (demo version)	3:02
5.	"One of These Days" (demo version)	2:31
6.	"Living on Fire" (demo version)	2:43

== Personnel ==
Band members

- Sharon den Adel – vocals
- Martijn Spierenburg – keyboards
- Stefan Helleblad – rhythm guitar, lead guitar
- Ruud Jolie – rhythm guitar
- Jeroen van Veen – bass guitar
- Mike Coolen – drums

Guest musicians

- Xzibit – rap vocals on tracks 1, 2 and 3
- Dave Pirner – vocals on track 3 of the Japanese edition

== Charts ==
Chart (2014)	Peak position
Japan (Oricon)	216
