= Whole World Is Watching =

Single by Within Temptation featuring Dave Pirner or Piotr Rogucki

from the album Hydra
- B-side: "Keep on Breathing"; "One of Those Days"
- Released: 22 January 2014 (PL); 21 February 2014 (main release); 29 March 2014 (UK)
- Recorded: 2013
- Genre: Symphonic rock, grunge
- Length: 4:03 (main version); 4:01 (Polish version)
- Label: Nuclear Blast
- Songwriter(s): Sharon den Adel; Robert Westerholt; Daniel Gibson
- Producer(s): Daniel Gibson

Within Temptation singles chronology
"Dangerous" (2013)	"Whole World Is Watching" (00000003)	"And We Run" (2014)

"Whole World Is Watching" is a song by Dutch symphonic metal band Within Temptation from their sixth studio album, Hydra. It was released in Poland as the third single from the album on 22 January 2014 and was scheduled to have its main release on 21 February. The song features guest vocals from Dave Pirner of Soul Asylum, with Polish rock singer Piotr Rogucki of the band Coma providing vocals on the Polish version of Hydra.

The song premiered on Polish national radio on 10 January 2014, and received its first airplay in the Netherlands and Belgium on 15 January 2014. In the United Kingdom, the song had its first airplay on BBC Radio 2 on June 6 during The Ken Bruce Show.

== Background ==
According to music critics and lead vocalist Sharon den Adel, the song is the slowest one on Hydra. Before the song was finished, the band was already considering inviting Dave Pirner to provide his vocals on the track by its "captivating" voice, turning the final result as the band thought that it should be. The song premiered on the Polish national radio station Polskie Radio Program III. The Polish version of the song features the native singer Piotr Rogucki instead of Pirner. A few days later, on 15 January 2014, the main version of the song, featuring Pirner, was released as a promotional song on Dutch and Belgian radio station Q-music. According to the band's official Facebook account, a video for the song was shot on 20 November 2013. A teaser trailer for the video was released on 24 January 2014 and the video was released on 31 January 2014, the same day of the Hydra release.

Sharon den Adel's explanation of the song's lyrics;

["Whole World Is Watching"] is about setbacks. Sometimes when you finally get back from the setback in your life, the thing that has given you certain problems, you feel like everybody who was informed about the problem that you had – maybe it could be a physical problem or a disease or you've been struggling with a certain kind of thing – everybody who knows it is watching and mentally supporting you while you're reaching that moment that you stand up and you get over that problem. That's a very positive feeling, a feeling of empowerment, like everybody is watching you while you're getting to this finish line. You finally ran that marathon and you finally reached the finish line. That's what the song is about. That's the feeling that we wanted to grasp. If you had something to battle for, something you've been working so hard for, it is the song when you come back and when you finally made that moment come true.

— Sharon den Adel, Songfacts Interview

== Live performances ==
During the Hydra World Tour, the song was frequently performed by the band in an acoustic rendition and only with den Adel's vocals. The band also performed the song on several occasions, such as TV performances and special events, and with different renditions. On 5 February 2014, an acoustic version was present at Dutch TV program De Wereld Draait Door. On 25 February 2014, the full electric version was played at Dutch TV program RTL Late Night. On 5 April 2014, the band performed the electric version of the song alongside Piotr Rogucki at the finals of the World Boxing Association in Rostock. Rogucki also joined the band at the 2015 Pol'and'Rock Festival to perform a special duet in the acoustic rendition of the song. On 27 March 2022, the band performed the song online when taking part in an international series of performances from several artists in support of Ukraine during the Russo-Ukrainian War, which was broadcast in more than 20 countries and featured more than 50 musical artists.

== Track listing ==
Main version
No.	Title	Length
1.	"Whole World Is Watching" (featuring Dave Pirner)	4:03
2.	"Whole World Is Watching" (featuring Piotr Rogucki)	4:01
3.	"Keep on Breathing" (demo version)	3:02
4.	"One of Those Days" (demo version)	2:31

Polish version
No.	Title	Length
1.	"Whole World Is Watching" (featuring Piotr Rogucki)	4:01

== Charts ==
Chart (2014)	Peak position
Belgium (Ultratip Bubbling Under Flanders)	9
Poland (Polish Airplay Top 100)	16
UK Rock & Metal (OCC)	34
