= Mother Earth (Within Temptation song) =

2002 single by Within Temptation

Single by Within Temptation

from the album Mother Earth
- B-side: "Bittersweet"; "Jane Doe"; "Ice Queen"; "Dark Wings"; "Our Farewell"
- Released: 2002, 1 October 2003 (Germany)
- Recorded: 2000
- Genre: Symphonic metal; gothic metal
- Length: 5.29
- Label: DSFA; GUN (re-releases)
- Songwriters: Robert Westerholt; Sharon den Adel; Eikens Augustinus

Within Temptation singles chronology
"Ice Queen" (2001)	"Mother Earth" (2002)	"Running Up that Hill" (2003)

Reissue cover
- German maxi 2003 reissue cover.

Music video
- "Mother Earth" on YouTube

"Mother Earth" is the third single by Dutch symphonic metal band Within Temptation from their second studio album, Mother Earth.

Along with the singles "Ice Queen" and "Stand My Ground", "Mother Earth" has become one of the band's signature songs and is present on the setlist at almost every concert. It was also used as the theme for the German translation of the anime X.

== Track listing ==
CD single (2002 Dutch release)

1. "Mother Earth" (single version) (4:02)
2. "Bittersweet" (non-album track) (3:21)

CD single (2002 Dutch release)

1. "Mother Earth" (single version) (4:02)
2. "Bittersweet" (non-album track) (3:21)
3. "Ice Queen" (radio edit) (3:48)
4. "Mother Earth" (Live at 013, Tilburg 2002) (6:12)
5. "Our Farewell" (Live at 013, Tilburg 2002) (5:26)
6. "Mother Earth" (Live 2002 at Lowlands, Biddinghuizen) (5:31)

CD maxi-single (2002 Dutch release)

1. "Mother Earth" (single version) (3:59)
2. "Bittersweet" (non-album track) (3:21)
3. "Ice Queen" (acoustic version 2002 - Isabelle 3FM) (3:50)
4. "Mother Earth" (live at 013, Tilburg 2002 - Week Van De Ned. Popmuziek 3FM) (6:12)
5. "Our Farewell" (live at 013, Tilburg 2002 - Week Van De Ned. Popmuziek 3FM) (5:26)
6. "Mother Earth" (video) (live Paris, 2002) (5:38)

CD single (2003 German release)

1. "Mother Earth" (single version) (4:02)
2. "Mother Earth" (Live 2002 at Lowlands, Biddinghuizen) (5:31)

CD single (2003 German release)

1. "Mother Earth" (single version) (4:02)
2. "Dark Wings" (album version) (4:16)
3. "Our Farewell" (radio edit) (3:56)

CD maxi-single (2003 German release) and U.S. iTunes Store EP

1. "Mother Earth" (single version) (4:02)
2. "Jane Doe" (non-album track) (4:30)
3. "Ice Queen" (live acoustic version) (3:47)
4. "Never-ending Story" (live acoustic version) (4:16)
5. "Mother Earth" (Live 2002 at Lowlands, Biddinghuizen) (5:31)

== Video ==
Although it's their third music video, the video for "Mother Earth" is the first professional one. It was directed by Patric Ullaeus. Filming location was by lake Delsjön near Gothenburg, Sweden. The video has a strong nature/pagan theme, with several aerial shots of lakes and forests, as well as different animals. Sharon den Adel is first shown as a woman (presumably "Mother Earth") transforming into an owl that flies around rivers and mountains. She is then depicted as walking around in the forest as a sort of magical spirit, interacting with nature, and performing in a forest glade with the rest of the band.

== Charts ==
=== Weekly charts ===
Chart (2002–2004)	Peak position
Belgium (Ultratop 50 Flanders)	33
Germany (GfK)	14
Netherlands (Dutch Top 40)	25
Netherlands (Single Top 100)	15
Switzerland (Schweizer Hitparade)	81

=== Year-end charts ===
Chart (2002)	Position
Netherlands (Dutch Top 40)	152
Netherlands (Single Top 100)	91
