= Dangerous (Within Temptation song) =

Single by Within Temptation featuring Howard Jones

from the album Hydra
- Released: 20 December 2013
- Recorded: 2013
- Genre: Symphonic metal; power metal; melodic metalcore
- Length: 4:52
- Label: Nuclear Blast
- Songwriters: Sharon den Adel; Daniel Gibson; Robert Westerholt
- Producer: Daniel Gibson

Within Temptation singles chronology
"Paradise (What About Us?)" (2013)	"Dangerous" (2013)	"Whole World Is Watching" (2014)

"Dangerous" is the second single by Dutch symphonic metal band Within Temptation from their sixth studio album, Hydra. It was released exclusively to iTunes on 20 December 2013 with an accompanying music video. The song features guest vocals from Light the Torch lead singer Howard Jones.

== Background ==
During den Adel's promotional travelings throughout Europe, critics and radio stations were given access to the new material, and the first public impression came through German radio station Rock Antenne, along with the first preview of "Dangerous", which was considered "fast" and "aggressive". The song is one of the band's heaviest to date, as den Adel stated that "it has the most bass drums we've ever used, too, and a very fast riff which we doubled with synths. It's not a typical synthesizer, though — it's distorted like a guitar, and it's very aggressive."

== Track listing ==
No.	Title	Length
1.	"Dangerous" (featuring Howard Jones)	4:52

== Music video ==
The music video was released on 20 December 2013 and was directed by Patric Ullaeus. The video features Howard Jones singing in Winnipeg, Manitoba Canada. He stands near Chez Sophie Sur Le Pont, (restaurant) on the Esplanade Riel (pedestrian bridge) next to the Provencher St. bridge. The band perform in a large room with lights wearing dark clothing. The main focus of the video is renowned skydiver Jokke Sommer, who is seen performing gliding through the air and pulling off impressive stunts such as navigating through a narrow gap between two buildings, over Lapa and around Sugarloaf in Rio de Janeiro. Howard Jones' dangerous feat is simply being outside during a Winnipeg winter.
