= Ivar de Graaf =

Dutch musician

- Born: Ivar de Graaf; 20 August 1973 (age 53)
- Origin: Amsterdam, North Holland
- Genres: Symphonic metal, symphonic rock
- Occupations: Drummer, composer, arranger
- Instruments: Drums, percussion, guitar
- Years active: 1990 -present
- Website: www.kingfishersky.nl

Ivar de Graaf (born 20 August 1973) is the founder and drummer of the Dutch progressive metal band Kingfisher Sky, but best known as the former drummer of the popular Dutch symphonic metal band Within Temptation.

== Early career ==
Ivar de Graaf was born in Amsterdam, and began playing drums at the age of 11. De Graaf followed education at the Haags Montessori Lyceum in The Hague, and was taught to play drums by Charles Schouten who has been the drummer for Kayak for a short period of time. On the HML he frequently performed with Edo van der Kolk and Michiel Parqui around 1990.

== Within Temptation ==
He was asked to be the drummer for Within Temptation 1996, at that the time the band was relatively unknown and began working on their first studio album. De Graaf was credited as the drummer on the Within Temptation albums Enter and on their breakthrough album Mother Earth.

In 2001 he left Within Temptation, just before the German tour and the band's international breakthrough. This was for musical reasons, he wanted to play more various and challenging drum fills instead of the more similar he experienced in Within Temptation, and develop himself more as a composer and arranger. He was replaced by Stephen van Haestregt.

De Graaf has performed with Within Temptation a few times after his departure. He filled in as a substitute at times when van Haestregt was unavailable, and at both the Java Concert in Amsterdam in 2005 and at the Elements Concert in Antwerp in 2012 he took on stage with other former Within Temptation band members and performed a couple of songs. He accompanied singer Sharon den Adel on acoustic guitar for Within Temptation's Together at Home concert on March 24, 2020.

== Kingfisher Sky ==
De Graaf is married to singer Judith Rijnveld. Together they worked for three years on a demo which led to the formation of Kingfisher Sky.

| Preceded by Dennis Leeflang | Drummer for Within Temptation; 1996–1998 | Succeeded by Ciro Palma |
| Preceded by Ciro Palma | Drummer for Within Temptation; 1999–2001 | Succeeded by Stephen van Haestregt |
| New title | Drummer for Kingfisher Sky since 2001 | Incumbent |
