= Ice Queen (song) =

Single by Within Temptation

from the album Mother Earth
- B-side: "Mother Earth"; "World of Make Believe"; "Caged"; "Believer"
- Released: June 2001
- Recorded: 2000
- Genre: Symphonic metal; gothic metal
- Length: 5:20 (album version); 3:50 (radio edit)
- Label: DSFA
- Songwriters: Robert Westerholt; Sharon den Adel

Within Temptation singles chronology
| "Our Farewell" (2001) | "Ice Queen" (2001) | "Mother Earth" (2003) |

"Ice Queen" is a song by Dutch symphonic metal band Within Temptation. It was released in June 2001 as the second single from their second studio album Mother Earth. The song was the band's commercial breakthrough, and it remains one of the band's most successful songs to date in Europe. It has been featured on the annual Dutch Top 2000 since 2011.

Along with the singles "Mother Earth," "Angels," and "Stand My Ground", "Ice Queen" has become one of the band's signature songs and is played as ending song on the setlist on almost every concert, except for some shows of The Unforgiving Tour onwards, where they started to end with the songs "Mother Earth" or "Stairway to the Skies".

== Lyrics ==
Like many of Within Temptation's songs, the lyrics of Ice Queen take their inspiration from nature. "It's a song about nature", said vocalist Sharon den Adel, in an interview with Dennis Weening on Westpop. "And how things go in nature". Guitarist Robert Westerholt further added that "it's about winter".

== Video ==
There are two official videos for the song "Ice Queen". The first video, released only in the Netherlands even though it is generally known as the "German Version", starts with a girl checking a website for concert videos. Then she finds two links, one saying 'Within Temptation'. She clicks on that link and their concert in Landgraaf in 2001, is shown on her screen. While watching the concert on her computer, she clicks on a couple of links and information on the band appears on her screen.

The second video was made for international release. Sharon, the singer, is dancing on a background of a blue, starry sky. She is wearing a white dress and has white extensions in her hair. The other band members are also shown before various backgrounds made with green-screen effects. Such as Robert, the rhythm guitarist, who is shown on a background of fire, or the drummer, who is shown on a background of a thunderstorm. After a while, all band members are shown together on a red planet.

== Track listing ==
CD single (original)

1. "Ice Queen" (radio edit) (3:48)
2. "Mother Earth" (album version) (5:29)

CD multi single (original) and U.S. iTunes Store EP released May 28, 2001

1. "Ice Queen" (radio edit) (3:48)
2. "Mother Earth" [live 11.02.2001 at Leidsekade, Amsterdam] (5:44)
3. "Caged" [live 11.02.2001 at Leidsekade, Amsterdam] (5:55)
4. "Ice Queen" [live 11.02.2001 at Leidsekade, Amsterdam] (5:11)
5. "Believer" ("Ice Queen" demo version, August 2000) (4:32)
6. "Caged" (demo version, August 2000) (4:32)

CD single (2002 release)

1. "Ice Queen" (radio edit) (3:48)
2. "Caged" [live 11.02.2001 at Leidsekade, Amsterdam] (5:55)

CD single (2003 release)

1. "Ice Queen" (radio edit) (3:48)
2. "Mother Earth" [live 11.02.2001 at Leidsekade, Amsterdam] (5:44)
3. "Ice Queen" (acoustic at "MXL") (3:52)

CD multi single (2003 release) and U.S. iTunes Store EP released May 12, 2003

1. "Ice Queen" (radio edit) (3:48)
2. "World of Make Believe" (non-album track) (4:47)
3. "Ice Queen" (acoustic at "MXL") (3:52)
4. "Ice Queen" [live 11.02.2001 at Leidsekade, Amsterdam] (5:11)
5. "Mother Earth" (orchestra version) (3:29)
6. "Mother Earth" [live 11.02.2001 at Leidsekade, Amsterdam] (5:44)

== Charts ==
=== Weekly charts ===
| Chart (2001–2003) | Peak position |
|---|---|
| Austria (Ö3 Austria Top 40) | 53 |
| Belgium (Ultratop 50 Flanders) | 3 |
| Germany (GfK) | 21 |
| Netherlands (Dutch Top 40) | 4 |
| Netherlands (Single Top 100) | 2 |

=== Year-end charts ===
| Chart (2002) | Position |
|---|---|
| Belgium (Ultratop 50 Flanders) | 12 |
| Netherlands (Dutch Top 40) | 19 |
| Netherlands (Single Top 100) | 17 |
| Chart (2003) | Position |
| Germany (Official German Charts) | 81 |

== Certifications and sales ==
| Region | Certification | Certified units/sales |
|---|---|---|
| Belgium (BRMA) | Gold | 25,000^{*} |
| Netherlands (NVPI) | Gold | 40,000^{^} |
^{*} Sales figures based on certification alone.^{^} Shipments figures based on certification alone.
