= DSFA Records =

Dutch record label

- Founded: 1990
- Founder: Anthony van den Berg
- Defunct: 2004
- Status: Inactive
- Genre: Metal
- Country of origin: Netherlands
- Location: Vlissingen

DSFA Records was a Dutch metal record label. The name stands for "Doesn't Stand For Anything". DSFA was founded in the beginning of the 1990s by Anthony van den Berg and was located in Vlissingen. Known bands for the label are Within Temptation, Trail Of Tears and Orphanage. The label has ended operations in 2004.

== See also ==
- List of record labels
