= Of Mice & Men discography =

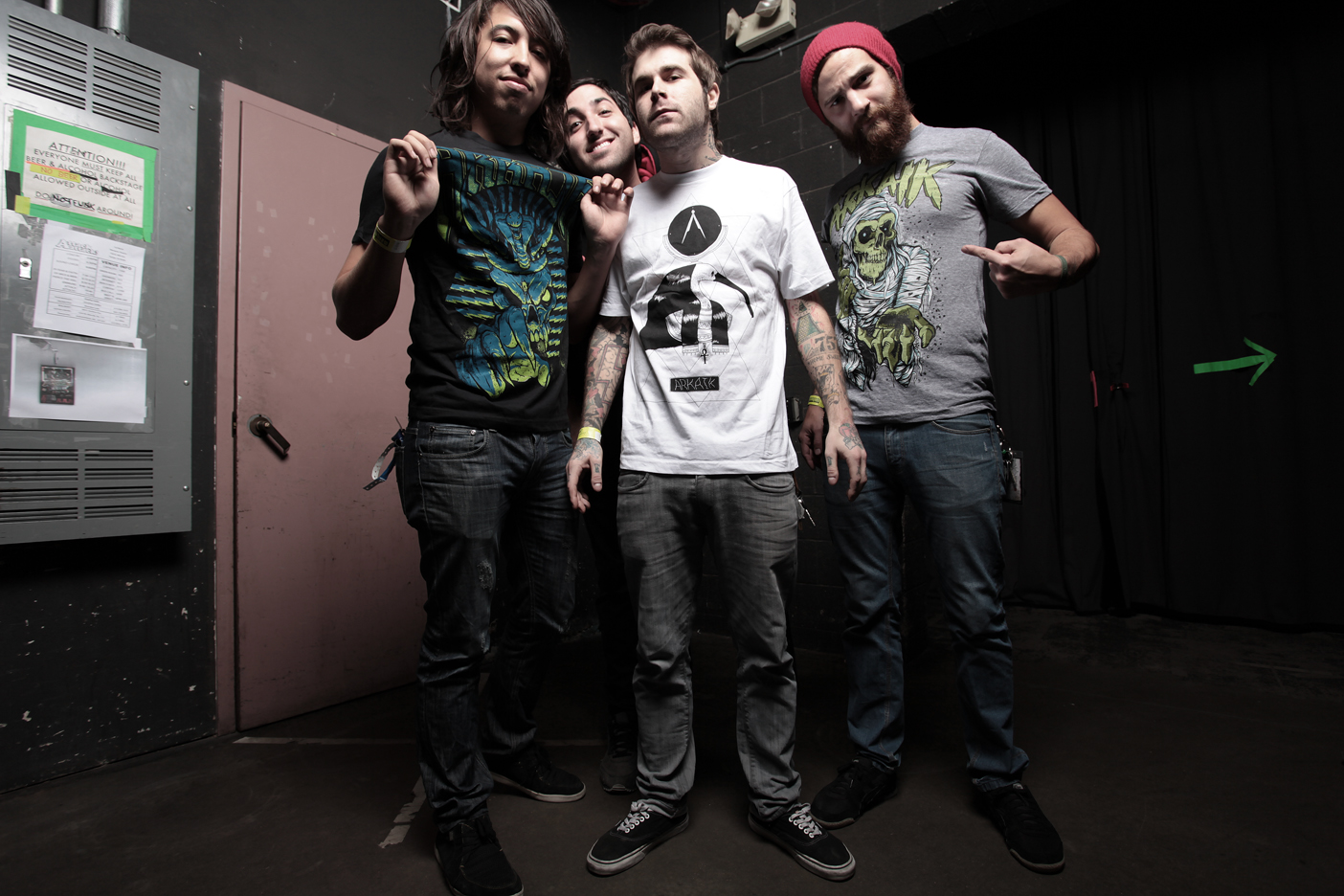
- Studio albums: 9
- EPs: 3
- Live albums: 1
- Singles: 35
- Music videos: 30

American rock band Of Mice & Men has released eight studio albums, one live album, three extended plays (EPs), 35 singles and 30 music videos.

The band released their first album of the same name, was released on March 9, 2010, and successfully entered the US Billboard 200, peaking at number 115. In the following year, they released their second album titled The Flood, which also released three singles; "Still YDG'N", "Purified" and "The Depths", neither charted. The Flood, however peaked at number 28 in the US.

The band did not release any new material until late 2013, where they released their first single for their 2014 album Restoring Force, titled "You're Not Alone". This was the band's first single to have charted in the US but was also the band's first efforts to have charted in the UK charts. The album itself was released on January 28, 2014, and had charted at number four in the US, number 17 in the UK and also number 36 in New Zealand and number nine in Australia, making it both the first album to chart internationally and the band's highest charting album to date.

== Albums ==
=== Studio albums ===
Title	Album details	Peak chart positions										Sales
Title	Album details	US	US Rock	US Indie	US Hard Rock	US Heat	AUS	GER	NZ	UK	UK Rock	Sales
Of Mice & Men	Released: March 9, 2010; Label: Rise; Formats: CD, digital download	115	35	12	10	3	—	—	—	—	—	
The Flood	Released: June 14, 2011; Label: Rise; Formats: LP, CD, digital download	28	6	5	3	—	—	—	—	—	—	US: 125,000
Restoring Force	Released: January 28, 2014; Label: Rise; Formats: LP, CD, digital download	4	2	1	1	—	9	—	36	17	2	US: 207,000
Cold World	Released: September 9, 2016; Label: Rise; Formats: LP, CD, CC, digital download	20	6	3	1	—	27	80	—	91	6	
Defy	Released: January 19, 2018; Label: Rise; Formats: LP, CD, CC, digital download	48	7	2	3	—	29	58	— (Note: Defy did not enter the NZ Top 40 Albums Chart, but peaked at number seven on the NZ Heatseeker Albums Chart.)	51	—	
Earthandsky	Released: September 27, 2019; Label: Rise; Formats: LP, CD, CC, digital download	—	13	11	5	—	— (Note: Earthandsky did not enter the ARIA Albums Chart, but peaked at number 25 on the ARIA Digital Album Chart.)	78	—	—	—	
Echo	Released: December 3, 2021; Label: SharpTone; Formats: LP, CD, CC, digital download	—	—	—	—	—	—	—	—	—	—	
Tether	Released: October 6, 2023; Label: SharpTone; Formats: LP, CD, CC, digital download	—	—	—	—	—	—	—	—	—	—	
Another Miracle	Released: November 14, 2025; Label: Century Media; Formats: LP, CD, CC, digital download	—	—	—	—	—	—	—	—	—	—	

=== Live albums ===
Title	Album details
Live at Brixton	Released: May 27, 2016; Label: Rise; Formats: LP, CD, DVD, CC, digital download

== Extended plays ==
Title	EP details
Timeless	Released: February 26, 2021; Label: SharpTone; Formats: LP, CD, CC, digital download
Bloom	Released: May 28, 2021; Label: SharpTone; Formats: LP, CD, CC, digital download
Ad Infinitum	Released: December 3, 2021; Label: SharpTone; Formats: LP, CD, CC, digital download

== Singles ==
Title	Year	Peak chart positions						Certifications	Album
Title	Year	US Rock	US Hard Rock Digi.	US Hard Rock	US Main.	US Rock Digi.	UK Rock	Certifications	Album
"Seven Thousand Miles for What"	2009	—	—	—	—	—	—		Of Mice & Men
"Second & Sebring"	2010	—	—	—	—	—	—	RIAA: Platinum	Of Mice & Men
"Those in Glass Houses"	2010	—	—	—	—	—	—		Of Mice & Men
"Still YDG'N"	2011	—	—	—	—	—	—		The Flood
"Purified"	2011	—	—	—	—	—	—		The Flood
"The Depths"	2012	—	—	—	—	—	—		The Flood (Deluxe reissue)
"You're Not Alone"	2013	28	2	—	—	45	7		Restoring Force
"Bones Exposed"	2013	—	—	—	—	—	—		Restoring Force
"Would You Still Be There"	2014	—	—	—	18	—	—	RIAA: Gold	Restoring Force
"Feels Like Forever"	2014	—	24	—	27	—	—		Restoring Force
"Broken Generation"	2015	—	—	—	—	—	31		Restoring Force: Full Circle
"Never Giving Up"	2015	—	20	—	20	—	—		Restoring Force: Full Circle
"Pain"	2016	—	11	—	—	—	—		Cold World
"Real"	2016	—	9	—	36	—	—		Cold World
"Contagious"	2016	—	—	—	—	—	—		Cold World
"Unbreakable"	2017	47	14	—	—	—	—		Defy
"Back to Me"	2017	—	9	—	32	—	—		Defy
"Warzone"	2017	—	—	—	—	—	—		Defy
"Defy"	2017	—	—	—	—	—	—		Defy
"Money" (Pink Floyd cover)	2018	—	—	—	29	—	—		Defy
"How to Survive"	2019	—	—	—	—	—	—		Earthandsky
"Mushroom Cloud"	2019	—	—	—	—	—	—		Earthandsky
"Earth & Sky"	2019	—	—	—	—	—	—		Earthandsky
"Taste of Regret"	2019	—	—	—	—	—	—		Earthandsky
"Obsolete"	2021	—	—	25	—	—	—		Timeless
"Timeless"	2021	—	21	—	—	—	—		Timeless
"Bloom"	2021	—	—	—	—	—	—		Bloom
"Mosaic"	2021	—	—	—	—	—	—		Ad Infinitum
"Fighting Gravity"	2021	—	—	—	—	—	—		Ad Infinitum
"Echo"	2021	—	—	—	—	—	—		Ad Infinitum
"Warpaint"	2023	—	—	—	—	—	—		Tether
"Castaway"	2023	—	—	—	39	—	—		Tether
"Indigo"	2023	—	—	—	—	—	—		Tether
"Another Miracle"	2025	—	—	—	—	—	—		Another Miracle
"Wake Up"	2025	—	—	—	16	—	—		Another Miracle
"Troubled Water"	2025	—	—	—	—	—	—		Another Miracle
"Flowers"	2025	—	—	—	—	—	—		Another Miracle
"—" denotes a recording that did not chart or was not released in that territory.

=== As featured artist ===
Song	Year	Album
"Night Terror" (Kayzo with Yultron featuring Of Mice & Men)	2019	Unleashed

== Other Charted Songs ==
Title	Year	Peak chart positions	Album
Title	Year	US Hard Rock Digi.	Album
"Anchor"	2021	13	Echo
"Levee"	2021	23	Echo

== Music videos ==
Song	Year	Album	Director	Type	Link
"Second & Sebring"	2010	Of Mice & Men	Spencer Nicholson	Narrative	
"Those in Glass Houses"	2010	Of Mice & Men	Spencer Nicholson	Performance	
"The Depths"	2012	The Flood (Deluxe reissue)	Sitcom Soldiers	Performance	
"Bones Exposed"	2014	Restoring Force	Max Moore	Narrative	
"Would You Still Be There"	2014	Restoring Force	Nathan Cox	Narrative	
"Feels Like Forever"	2014	Restoring Force	Nathan William	Performance	
"Identity Disorder"	2014	Restoring Force	Jon Stone	Performance	
"Broken Generation"	2015	Restoring Force	Max Moore	Narrative	
"Another You"	2015	Restoring Force	Jon Stone	Performance	
"Never Giving Up"	2015	Restoring Force	Strati Hovartos	Live performance	
"The Depths" (Live at Brixton)	2016	Live at Brixton	Jon Stone	Live performance	
"Feels Like Forever" (Live at Brixton)	2016	Live at Brixton	Jon Stone	Live performance	
"Pain"	2016	Cold World	Mark Lediard	Performance	
"Real"	2016	Cold World	Max Moore	Narrative	
"Unbreakable"	2017	Defy	Max Moore	Performance	
"Back to Me"	2017	Defy	N/A	Performance	
"Warzone"	2017	Defy	Michael Colasardo and Luke DeLong	Performance	
"Instincts"	2018	Defy	Ben Anderson	Performance	
"How to Survive"	2019	Earthandsky	Zev Deans	Narrative	
"Mushroom Cloud"	2019	Earthandsky	Mark Lediard	Narrative	
"Earth & Sky"	2019	Earthandsky	Mark Lediard	Performance	
"Taste of Regret"	2019	Earthandsky	Mark Lediard	Narrative	
"Obsolete"	2021	Timeless	Frankie Nasso	Narrative	
"Bloom"	2021	Bloom	Frankie Nasso	Narrative	
"Fighting Gravity"	2021	Ad Infinitum	Frankie Nasso	Narrative	
"Warpaint"	2023	Tether	Mark Lediard	Performance	
"Castaway"	2023	Tether	Mark Lediard	Narrative	
"Into the Sun"	2023	Tether	Mark Lediard	Performance	
"Another Miracle"	2025	Another Miracle	Mike Matsui	Narrative	
"Wake Up"	2025	Another Miracle	Mike Matsui	Performance	
"Troubled Water"	2025	Another Miracle	Mike Matsui	Performance	
"Flowers"	2025	Another Miracle	Mike Matsui	Live Performance	
