= 2018 in downloadable songs for the Rock Band series =

- Songs released: 125
- Packs released: 7
- Albums released: 0

The Rock Band series of music video games supports downloadable songs for the Xbox One and PlayStation 4 versions through the consoles' respective online services. Users can download songs on a track-by-track basis, with many of the tracks also offered as part of a "song pack" or complete album at a discounted rate.

== List of songs released in 2018 ==
The following table lists the available songs for the Rock Band series released in 2018. All songs available in packs are also available as individual song downloads on the same date, unless otherwise noted. Dates listed are the initial release of songs on PlayStation Network and Xbox Live.

Starting from October 6, 2015, all music added to the downloadable content catalog is exclusive to Rock Band 4. In addition, due to changes in the charting format and gameplay of Rock Band 4, the released songs no longer support keyboard or Pro guitar and bass (future downloadable content will continue to support vocal harmonies and Pro drum charts), and most songs no longer display "family friendly" or "supervision recommended" ratings. Downloadable content from previous Rock Band titles (excepting The Beatles: Rock Band) is forward-compatible in Rock Band 4 within the same system family (Xbox 360 downloads are usable in the Xbox One version and PlayStation 3 downloads are usable in the PlayStation 4 version) at no additional cost.

Song title	Artist	Year	Genre	Single / Pack name	Release date
"Enjoy the Silence"	Depeche Mode	1990	Pop/Dance/Electronic	Single	Jan 4, 2018
"We Got the Beat" (Note: Song was previously included in Rock Band 2.)	The Go-Go's	1981	Pop-Rock	Single	Jan 4, 2018
"Torn"	Natalie Imbruglia	1997	Pop-Rock	Single	Jan 4, 2018
"Open Water" (Note: Song is available at no cost.) (Note: Song is exclusively available to Rock Band Rivals owners.)	Assuming We Survive	2016	Rock	Discover LA: KROQ Locals Only	Jan 9, 2018
"Shy"	HUNNY	2017	Indie Rock	Discover LA: KROQ Locals Only	Jan 9, 2018
"Bloodhands (Oh My Fever)"	In the Valley Below	2017	Indie Rock	Discover LA: KROQ Locals Only	Jan 9, 2018
"Who's Your Lover"	Nightmare Air	2017	Indie Rock	Discover LA: KROQ Locals Only	Jan 9, 2018
"Radio"	No Small Children	2017	Rock	Discover LA: KROQ Locals Only	Jan 9, 2018
"I Remember You"	Skid Row	1989	Glam	Single	Jan 11, 2018
"Here I Go Again" (Note: Song was previously included in Rock Band 3.)	Whitesnake	1987	Glam	Single	Jan 11, 2018
"Burnin' It Down"	Jason Aldean	2014	Country	Going Country 10	Jan 18, 2018
"Body Like a Back Road"	Sam Hunt	2017	Country	Going Country 10	Jan 18, 2018
"That Don't Impress Me Much"	Shania Twain	1997	Country	Going Country 10	Jan 18, 2018
"Lonely Is the Night"	Billy Squier	1981	Classic Rock	Single	Jan 25, 2018
"Takin' Care of Business"	Bachman–Turner Overdrive	1974	Classic Rock	Single	Jan 25, 2018
"A Sky Full of Stars"	Coldplay	2014	Alternative	Single	Feb 1, 2018
"Live in the Moment"	Portugal. The Man	2017	Alternative	Single	Feb 1, 2018
"Absolutely (Story of a Girl)"	Nine Days	2000	Alternative	Single	Feb 8, 2018
"Brick House"	Commodores	1977	R&B/Soul/Funk	Single	Feb 8, 2018
"Slide"	Goo Goo Dolls	1998	Alternative	Single	Feb 15, 2018
"Unwell"	Matchbox Twenty	2002	Alternative	Single	Feb 15, 2018
"I Don't Want to Be"	Gavin DeGraw	2003	Pop-Rock	Single	Feb 22, 2018
"Broken"	Seether ft. Amy Lee	2004	Rock	Single	Feb 22, 2018
"Believer"	Imagine Dragons	2017	Alternative	Single	Mar 1, 2018
"Two Princes" (Note: Song was previously included in Lego Rock Band.)	Spin Doctors	1993	Alternative	Single	Mar 1, 2018
"All You Wanted"	Michelle Branch	2001	Alternative	Single	Mar 8, 2018
"Unwritten"	Natasha Bedingfield	2004	Pop-Rock	Single	Mar 8, 2018
"Bad Company"	Bad Company	1974	Classic Rock	Single	Mar 15, 2018
"Roll to Me"	Del Amitri	1995	Alternative	Single	Mar 15, 2018
"Is She Really Going Out with Him?"	Joe Jackson	1978	Classic Rock	Single	Mar 22, 2018
"Cumbersome"	Seven Mary Three	1995	Alternative	Single	Mar 22, 2018
"Stolen Dance"	Milky Chance	2013	Alternative	Single	Mar 29, 2018
"I Want You"	Savage Garden	1997	Pop-Rock	Single	Mar 29, 2018
"Run-Around"	Blues Traveler	1994	Rock	Single	Apr 5, 2018
"Steal My Sunshine"	Len	1999	Alternative	Single	Apr 5, 2018
"Torn in Two"	Breaking Benjamin	2018	Rock	Single	Apr 12, 2018
"The Heart from Your Hate"	Trivium	2017	Metal	Single	Apr 12, 2018
"Karma Chameleon"	Culture Club	1983	New Wave	Single	Apr 19, 2018
"Pictures of Matchstick Men"	Status Quo	1968	Classic Rock	Single	Apr 19, 2018
"We Are Family"	Sister Sledge	1979	R&B/Soul/Funk	Single	Apr 26, 2018
"Right Here, Right Now"	Jesus Jones	1991	Alternative	Single	Apr 26, 2018
"Forget About Tomorrow"	The Bergamot	2016	Alternative	Discover: ReverbNation and Firefly Music Festival	May 3, 2018
"I Hear the Dead"	Dolly Spartans	2017	Alternative	Discover: ReverbNation and Firefly Music Festival	May 3, 2018
"Body Like That"	The Eiffels	2018	Alternative	Discover: ReverbNation and Firefly Music Festival	May 3, 2018
"Vinyl"	Fly By Midnight	2018	Pop/Dance/Electronic	Discover: ReverbNation and Firefly Music Festival	May 3, 2018
"Shame"	Jocelyn & Chris Arndt	2016	Rock	Discover: ReverbNation and Firefly Music Festival	May 3, 2018
"Hungry Like the Wolf"	Duran Duran	1982	New Wave	Single	May 10, 2018
"Creep" (Note: Song was previously included in Rock Band.)	Radiohead	1993	Alternative	Single	May 10, 2018
"Reptilia"	The Strokes	2003	Rock	Single	May 17, 2018
"Survive"	The Warning	2017	Rock	Single	May 17, 2018
"Bodies" (Note: Song was previously released as part of the Rock Band Network.)	Drowning Pool	2001	Rock	Single	May 24, 2018
"Higher"	Creed	1999	Rock	Single	May 24, 2018
"Going Under"	Evanescence	2003	Nu-Metal	Single	May 31, 2018
"If It Means a Lot to You"	A Day to Remember	2009	Rock	Single	May 31, 2018
"A Prophecy"	Asking Alexandria	2009	Metal	Single	Jun 7, 2018
"Country Song"	Seether	2011	Rock	Single	Jun 7, 2018
"Airbrushed"	Anamanaguchi	2010	Pop/Dance/Electronic	Single	Jun 14, 2018
"Code Monkey"	Jonathan Coulton	2006	Pop-Rock	Single	Jun 14, 2018
"Hey Baby, Here's That Song You Wanted"	Blessthefall	2009	Rock	Single	Jun 21, 2018
"Relentless Chaos"	Miss May I	2010	Metal	Single	Jun 21, 2018
"Drunken Lullabies (Live)"	Flogging Molly	2010	Alternative	Single	Jun 28, 2018
"Bullet with a Name"	Nonpoint	2005	Rock	Single	Jun 28, 2018
"Reminiscing"	Little River Band	1978	Classic Rock	Yacht Rock 01	Jul 3, 2018
"Brandy (You're a Fine Girl)"	Looking Glass	1972	Classic Rock	Yacht Rock 01	Jul 3, 2018
"Baby Come Back"	Player	1977	Classic Rock	Yacht Rock 01	Jul 3, 2018
"Burn It Down"	Five Finger Death Punch	2009	Metal	Single	Jul 12, 2018
"Hard to See"	Five Finger Death Punch	2009	Metal	Single	Jul 12, 2018
"All I Want"	A Day to Remember	2010	Punk	Single	Jul 19, 2018
"I'm Made of Wax, Larry, What Are You Made Of?"	A Day to Remember	2009	Punk	Single	Jul 19, 2018
"Fake It"	Seether	2007	Rock	Single	Jul 19, 2018
"Rise Above This"	Seether	2007	Rock	Single	Jul 19, 2018
"Rescue Me"	30 Seconds to Mars	2018	Rock	Single	Jul 26, 2018
"Kamikaze"	Walk the Moon	2017	Pop-Rock	Single	Jul 26, 2018
"Give Yourself a Try"	The 1975	2018	Alternative	Single	Aug 2, 2018
"Youngblood"	5 Seconds of Summer	2018	Pop-Rock	Single	Aug 2, 2018
"This Will Be the Day"	Jeff Williams ft. Casey Lee Williams	2013	Rock	Single	Aug 9, 2018
"The Touch"	Stan Bush	2007	Rock	Single	Aug 9, 2018
"Pac-Man Fever"	Buckner & Garcia	1999	Novelty	Single	Aug 16, 2018
"Tastes Like Kevin Bacon"	iwrestledabearonce	2009	Metal	Single	Aug 16, 2018
"BEER!!"	Psychostick	2003	Metal	Single	Aug 16, 2018
"Broken"	lovelytheband	2017	Alternative	Single	Aug 23, 2018
"Sober Up"	AJR ft. Rivers Cuomo	2017	Pop-Rock	Single	Aug 23, 2018
"River of Tuoni"	Amberian Dawn	2006	Metal	Single	Aug 30, 2018
"Knifeman"	The Bronx	2008	Punk	Single	Aug 30, 2018
"American Dream"	Silverstein	2009	Rock	Single	Aug 30, 2018
"Escape (The Piña Colada Song)"	Rupert Holmes	1979	Pop-Rock	Single	Sep 6, 2018
"Red Red Wine"	UB40	1983	Reggae/Ska	Single	Sep 6, 2018
"Pictures of Girls"	Wallows	2018	Alternative	Single	Sep 13, 2018
"Simplify"	Young the Giant	2018	Alternative	Single	Sep 13, 2018
"Dogs Can Grow Beards All Over"	The Devil Wears Prada	2006	Metal	Single	Sep 20, 2018
"HTML Rulez D00d"	The Devil Wears Prada	2007	Metal	Single	Sep 20, 2018
"Jamie All Over"	Mayday Parade	2009	Rock	Single	Sep 20, 2018
"When I Get Home You're So Dead"	Mayday Parade	2009	Rock	Single	Sep 20, 2018
"Unheavenly Creatures"	Coheed and Cambria	2018	Prog	Single	Sep 27, 2018
"When the Curtain Falls"	Greta Van Fleet	2018	Rock	Single	Sep 27, 2018
"Business Time"	Flight of the Conchords	2008	Novelty	Single	Oct 4, 2018
"The Most Beautiful Girl (In the Room)"	Flight of the Conchords	2008	Novelty	Single	Oct 4, 2018
"Graffiti"	Chvrches	2018	Alternative	Single	Oct 11, 2018
"Uncomfortable"	Halestorm	2018	Rock	Single	Oct 11, 2018
"Back to Me"	Of Mice & Men	2018	Metal	Of Mice & Men 01	Oct 18, 2018
"Second & Sebring"	Of Mice & Men	2010	Metal	Of Mice & Men 01	Oct 18, 2018
"Those in Glass Houses"	Of Mice & Men	2010	Metal	Of Mice & Men 01	Oct 18, 2018
"Three Lives"	Octavision	2016	Prog	Single	Oct 25, 2018
"My Demons"	Starset	2014	Rock	Single	Oct 25, 2018
"Paralyzer"	Finger Eleven	2007	Alternative	Single	Nov 1, 2018
"Australia"	The Shins	2007	Indie Rock	Single	Nov 1, 2018
"Little Black Backpack '09"	Stroke 9	2010	Rock	Single	Nov 1, 2018
"Time to Say Goodbye"	Jeff Williams ft. Casey Lee Williams	2014	Rock	Single	Nov 1, 2018
"Thinking Emoji"	Barely March	2018	Punk	Discover: ReverbNation 01	Nov 8, 2018
"Love That Hurts"	PREACHERVAN	2018	Alternative	Discover: ReverbNation 01	Nov 8, 2018
"Let's Just Dance"	Ships Have Sailed	2018	Alternative	Discover: ReverbNation 01	Nov 8, 2018
"Save Yourself"	tiLLie	2017	Alternative	Discover: ReverbNation 01	Nov 8, 2018
"Is There a Ghost"	Band of Horses	2007	Indie Rock	Band of Horses 01	Nov 15, 2018
"No One's Gonna Love You"	Band of Horses	2007	Indie Rock	Band of Horses 01	Nov 15, 2018
"The Funeral"	Band of Horses	2006	Indie Rock	Band of Horses 01	Nov 15, 2018
"One Step Closer"	Linkin Park	2000	Nu-Metal	Single	Nov 20, 2018
"Come Out and Play (Keep 'Em Separated)"	The Offspring	1994	Punk	Single	Nov 20, 2018
"Natural"	Imagine Dragons	2018	Alternative	Single	Nov 29, 2018
"Girls Like You"	Maroon 5	2017	Pop-Rock	Single	Nov 29, 2018
"Crazy on You"	Heart	1976	Classic Rock	Single	Dec 6, 2018
"Magic Man"	Heart	1976	Classic Rock	Single	Dec 6, 2018
"Lose It"	Kane Brown	2018	Country	Single	Dec 13, 2018
"Hotel Key"	Old Dominion	2017	Country	Single	Dec 13, 2018
"Never Let You Go '09"	Third Eye Blind	2009	Alternative	Single	Dec 20, 2018
"Semi Charmed Life '09"	Third Eye Blind	2009	Alternative	Single	Dec 20, 2018
"99"	Barns Courtney	2018	Alternative	Single	Dec 20, 2018
"Music Is Worth Living For"	Andrew W.K.	2018	Rock	Single	Dec 20, 2018
