= You're Not Alone (Of Mice & Men song) =

Single by Of Mice & Men

from the album Restoring Force
- Released: December 2, 2013
- Recorded: 2013
- Genre: Nu metal; alternative metal
- Length: 3:21
- Label: Rise
- Songwriters: Austin Carlile; Alan Ashby; Aaron Pauley
- Producer: David Bendeth

Of Mice & Men singles chronology
"The Depths" (2012)	"You're Not Alone" (2013)	"Bones Exposed" (2013)

"You're Not Alone" is the first single from the third Of Mice & Men album Restoring Force.

== Release ==
The song was premiered on the first of December, 2013, accompanied with a lyric video, while the single was released on Google Play and iTunes on December 3. This dates the first release the band has made with the new bass player and clean vocalist Aaron Pauley, formerly of Jamie's Elsewhere, who replaced former member Shayley Bourget. It is also the band's first charting single, peaking at number seven in the UK rock charts and number 44 in the US rock charts. This song premiered the band's new album, Restoring Force which was released on January 28, 2014, via Rise Records. The band's front runner Austin Carlile unveils his reasoning for the name when saying, "What happens after a disaster? What happens after The Flood? You return to normal. You find balance again. That's what we felt like were doing with this album. We wanted this record to bring equilibrium back to our band and music. We're letting everyone know that we're here to stay. We're 'Restoring Force'."

== Lyrics and meaning ==
Carlile stated during the premier of the lyric video with Loudwire that he wanted listeners "...to know they're not alone. We're all going through it with them." It is also supposed to follow a theme of "togetherness, working together, and being a family" with the rest of the album. Carlile wants his fans to know that they're not alone and to feel a sense of togetherness from the group.

== Critical reception ==
Professional ratings
Review scores
Source	Rating
Artistdirect	5/5

The single was positively reviewed. When Loudwire premiered the lyric video, they stated that the song alternated between "...an uplifting refrain and guttural verse...". Artistdirect reviewer Rick Florino praised the way the clean and scream vocals composed together and that the mix of guitar riffs and "chugs" where an "...elegant balance between crashing heavy metal and careening hard rock", and that the revolutionary sound compared to the last two albums were similar to the change Deftones made between the albums Around the Fur and White Pony.

Under the Gun's James Shotwell also praised the vocals used in the song, stating that the vocals of Aaron Pauley worked well with Austin Carlile. Shotwell also said that despite metalcore being an "overcrowded" genre, the band appears to have "...managed to captivate throngs of young music fans with an intensity unmatched by their genre peers..." and continued to say that this particular song is one of the band's greatest efforts, praising the new musical direction the band is taking, comparing the efforts to bands such as Disturbed and Slipknot.

== Chart performance ==
Chart	Peak position
UK Rock & Metal Singles Top 40	7
US Billboard Hot Rock Songs	28
