= Live at Brixton (Of Mice & Men album) =

Live album by Of Mice & Men
- Released: May 27, 2016
- Recorded: March 2015
- Venues: Brixton Academy, London, England
- Genre: Metalcore
- Length: 64:15
- Label: Rise

Of Mice & Men chronology
Restoring Force (2014)	Live at Brixton (2016)	Cold World (2016)

Live at Brixton is the first live album by American rock band Of Mice & Men. It was released on May 27, 2016, through Rise Records.

Professional ratings
Review scores
Source	Rating
AllMusic	3.5/5 stars

== Track listing ==
No.	Title	Length
1.	"Public Service Announcement"	3:49
2.	"Glass Hearts"	3:18
3.	"Broken Generation"	4:02
4.	"O.G. Loko"	3:43
5.	"Let Live"	4:27
6.	"You Make Me Sick"	3:24
7.	"This One's for You"	3:02
8.	"Feels Like Forever"	3:12
9.	"Bones Exposed"	5:16
10.	"Would You Still Be There"	4:44
11.	"Another You"	6:05
12.	"Identity Disorder"	4:05
13.	"Second & Sebring"	7:13
14.	"The Depths"	3:58
15.	"You're Not Alone"	4:00
Total length:		64:15

== Personnel ==
- Austin Carlile – unclean vocals
- Phil Manansala – lead guitar
- Alan Ashby – rhythm guitar
- Aaron Pauley – bass, clean vocals
- Valentino Arteaga – drums, percussion
