= Dayshell =

American metal band

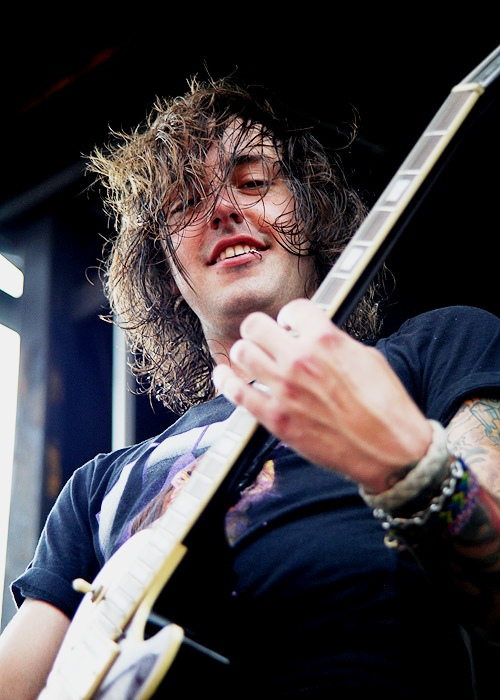
- Lead vocalist Shayley Bourget

Background information
- Origin: Southern California, U.S.
- Genres: Post-hardcore; metalcore; alternative metal
- Years active: 2012–present
- Labels: Spinefarm, Sumerian
- Spinoff of: Of Mice & Men
- Members: Shayley Bourget
- Past members: Jordan Wooley; Raul Martinez; Zack Baker; Tyler Shippy

Dayshell is a solo project consisting of American producer and singer-songwriter Shayley Dayshell Bourget. Formerly Of Mice & Men's clean vocalist, guitarist, and bassist, Bourget earned a dedicated fanbase with his unique vocals and input toward the music industry. Dayshell's debut self-titled album was released on October 15, 2013. The band's second album, Nexus, was released on October 7, 2016. The band released a third album titled Mr. Pain on October 29, 2019. Pegasus, Dayshell's highly-anticipated fourth album, was brought to life with the support of many hardcore fans who donated to "Operation Pegasus" on GoFundMe. Dayshell's latest album "Pegasus" released on September 22, 2023.

== History ==
=== Formation, debut album and tour (2012–2014) ===
Dayshell came to prominence after Shayley Bourget's departure from metalcore band Of Mice & Men in 2012. Dayshell was initially a side project started with Bourget & Martinez in the beginning of 2012. On March 10, 2012, the two released a demo version of the song "Share With Me." Fans of Bourget reacted with great positivity to the song and what it meant to them. The launch of the demo created a tiny whirlwind of steam for the two. Before the group had a full line up, Martinez was contacted by phone by Sumerian Records. Former ex band member of Covette, Jordan Wooley, Bass, had joined the duo Summer 2012. The band released a video titled 'The Beginning' discussing how the band first formed.

The band signed to the label Sumerian Records with a video teaser to the release of "Share With Me" from the band's self-titled album including, three later singles from the debut. Tyler Shippy was welcomed into the band on February 27, 2014. After the release of their self-titled they embarked a tour with bands, Middle Class Rut and Chevelle and a tour in North America, and the European Tour across Europe and the UK supporting The Word Alive, I See Stars, Crown The Empire, Get Scared and Palisades.

=== Line-up changes, label and Nexus (2015–2018) ===
The band announced the departures of Shippy in February 2015 and Martinez in July 2015 on Facebook citing personal and creative differences. Despite the departure of Shippy and Martinez the band continued to tour on the All Stars Tour in May 2015 then followed by the Dance Gavin Dance 10 Year Anniversary Tour alongside Slaves, A Lot Like Birds and Strawberry Girls in November and December 2015.

On July 5, 2016, the band left Sumerian Records and signed to Spinefarm Records to release their second album, Nexus, which was released on October 7, 2016. This news was followed by the first single from the album, "Carsick", along with the announcement that Zack Baker was the new drummer replacing Martinez. The band released the second single from the album, "Low Light", on August 12, 2016.

=== Mr Pain (2018–present) ===
Zack Baker left the band in 2018, and went on to tour with the post-hardcore outfit Slaves before becoming a permanent member of the band. Tyler Shippy came back to the band, and pursued the role of bass. Three new singles “FeelFly”, “H8WAVE” and an unofficial B-Side track "Recovering Flames" had been released as stand alone tracks. The first single from the upcoming album Mr. Pain titled "Pressure" was released on February 19, 2019, later accompanied with a music video released two days later. On March 2, it was announced that another single featuring Dropout Kings called "KOMBAT" would be released on March 19, 2019.

On May 10, 2019, Dayshell released the single, "Superhuman". On August 9, 2019, the single "Spellbound" was released from the album Mr. Pain, which was released on October 29, 2019.

== Band members ==
Current members

- Shayley Bourget – lead vocals, guitars, keyboards (2012–present), bass (2017–present), drums, percussion (2015, 2018–present)

Former members

- Raul Martinez – drums, percussion, audio production (2012–2015)
- Jordan Wooley – bass, backing vocals (2012–2017)
- Tyler Shippy – guitar, backing vocals (2012–2015, 2018–2019), bass (2018–2019)
- Zack Baker – drums, percussion (2016–2018)

Current touring musicians

- Jeff Dorber – drums (2019–present)
- Gigi Zimmer – bass (2019–present)
- Harrison Muffley – guitar (2018–present)

Former touring musicians

- Sebastian Kerravcic – guitar (2013–2016)
- Andrew Whiting – guitar (2016–2017)
- Alex Vera – bass (2017–2018)
- Mack Rubic – guitar (2017–2018)
- PJ Huesmann – drums (2018–2019)

== Discography ==
=== Studio albums ===
- Dayshell (2013)
- Nexus (2016)
- Mr. Pain (2019)
- Pegasus (2023)

==== Singles ====
| Title | Year | Album |
|---|---|---|
| ”Share With Me” | 2013 | Dayshell |
| "Car Sick" | 2016 | Nexus |
| "Low Light" | 2016 | Nexus |
| "H8wave" | 2018 | Non-album single |
| "FeelFly" | 2018 | Non-album single |
| "Pressure" | 2019 | Mr. Pain |
| "Kombat" (featuring Dropout Kings) | 2019 | Mr. Pain |
| "Superhuman" | 2019 | Mr. Pain |
| "Spellbound" | 2019 | Mr. Pain |
| "Nostalgia" (featuring Julian Witt) | 2019 | Mr. Pain |
| "Blindside" | 2021 | Non-album single |
| "Letting Go" | 2022 | Pegasus |
| "You Wish" | 2023 | Pegasus |
| "Not Welcome" | 2023 | Pegasus |
