= Jamie's Elsewhere =

American post-hardcore band

- Origin: Sacramento, California, U.S.
- Genres: Post-hardcore; metalcore; electronicore (early)
- Years active: 2005–2015; 2020–present
- Labels: Victory; SharpTone
- Members: Aaron Pauley; Matt Scarpelli; Mike Spearman; Chance Medeiros
- Past members: Justin Kyle; Chris Paterson; Nick Rodriguez; Anthony Carioscia; Anthony Scarpelli; Scott Daby; Mike Wellnitz; Zach Wasmundt

Jamie's Elsewhere is an American post-hardcore band formed in Sacramento, California, United States, in 2005. They were signed to Victory Records before deciding not to renew their contract with the label, and have released three full-length albums; Guidebook for Sinners Turned Saints in 2008, They Said a Storm Was Coming in 2010 and Rebel-Revive in 2014.

== History ==
=== Formation and first releases (2005–2008) ===
The band was formed early in 2005 when brothers Matthew and Anthony Scarpelli (guitar and drums, respectively) began writing songs together. In order to audition for the guitar part, Anthony Carioscia flew over 2,000 miles. He was welcomed into the band, and soon after, they picked up locals Mike Spearman on keyboards and Nick Rodriguez on bass. The five came together under the name Jamie's Elsewhere, the name being derived from an 80's Chicago area venue (which has since burned down) where the Scarpelli's father used to perform. They began writing material for their debut album for year and a half while still looking for a vocalist. Some of the band members attended a party where Chris Paterson, who had ironically missed an original audition due to an automobile accident, happened to be performing. They invited him to join the band, and upon accepting, they entered the studio the very next day with producer Phil Devereux of Deathbot Studios.

As a result of the recording session, Jamie's Elsewhere was able to self-release an EP. They toured the west coast for a year in support of the album and sold over 5,000 albums personally. This work ethic drew the attention of Victory Records, and Jamie's Elsewhere was quickly signed to the label at the end of 2007. After hiring Casey Bates (Chiodos, Fear Before) to produce the album, they entered the studio to record their debut album, A Guidebook for Sinners Turned Saints. Matt Scarpelli explained that this title was selected because Patterson's lyrics focused on personal hardships. The album was released in May 2008.

Jamie's Elsewhere supported up and coming band Eyes Set To Kill on select dates of their "Tour of Winter" along with Blinded Black.

Jamie's Elsewhere participated on the Nothing But A Ghost Tour along with Four Letter Lie, Our Last Night, There For Tomorrow, and Capital Lights.

=== Rebuilding and They Said a Storm Was Coming (2009–2010) ===
After the release of A Guidebook, Paterson, Carioscia, Rodriguez, and Anthony Scarpelli left the band, leaving only Spearman (keyboards) and Matt Scarpelli (guitars) left. In July 2008 before his departure, however, Anthony Scarpelli invited friend and former vocalist of the band Razing Alexandria Aaron Pauley to try out for the vacant vocalist position. He was invited to join the band, and after finding Scott Daby (drums), Chance Mederios (bass) and Mike Wellnitz (guitar), Jamie's Elsewhere was able to replace all of their former members. In 2009, they wrote all the material for their second album over the course of eight months and recorded it in three weeks. On February 16, 2010, their second album They Said a Storm Was Coming was released.

The band hit the road for a few dates of the "St. Valentine's Day Massatour" supporting Motionless In White, Of Machines and others. They then supported Alesana, A Static Lullaby, Motionless In White, and Greeley Estates on the "En-Tour-Age" Tour.

They set out on their first headlining tour in support of They Said A Storm Was Coming bringing along Memphis May Fire. They then headlined the "Westbound And Down" Tour.

Shortly after, the band jumped on the "Tour Fast Tour Furious" Tour with headliners Before Their Eyes, along with support from No Bragging Rights, Ice Nine Kills, and To Speak of Wolves.

The band then continued their headline tour in support of their album, with the first leg featuring support from Icon For Hire, and These Hearts, and the second leg featuring Secrets and Life On Repeat.

=== Line-up instability, leaving Victory Records (2011–2012) ===
In July 2011, Jamie's Elsewhere amicably parted ways with drummer Scott Daby and rhythm guitarist Mike Wellnitz. Although they have not announced an official replacement for either, they have stated via Facebook that they have been writing and recording material for their untitled follow-up to They Said a Storm Was Coming. In an interview, Aaron Pauley stated that they are hoping for an early 2012 release at the very latest. Pauley also hinted at the possible release of an EP before their new album which would contain acoustic versions of songs from They Said a Storm Was Coming.

On August 29, 2011, Jamie's Elsewhere revealed they have left their label, Victory Records, via a press release on their Facebook page.

On January 3, 2012, Jamie's Elsewhere announced the release of their new EP entitled Reimagined, which will consist of re-recordings of songs from their 2010 album They Said a Storm Was Coming in a more mellow and acoustic form, rather the band's traditional post-hardcore style. The release date was set for February 14, 2012.

In 2012, it was stated that Aaron Pauley would be touring with Of Mice & Men on both vocals and bass. Because Jamie's Elsewhere was touring Japan at the same time, rumors began to spread that Pauley's departure was imminent. Pauley himself has since revealed that he is no longer a member of Jamie's Elsewhere. However, he is still on good terms with the band. It is speculated that Pauley will have a permanent position in Of Mice & Men following the Vans Warped Tour. Justin Kyle, who previously took over vocals during their Japan 2012 tour, announced on November 30 that he is Jamie's Elsewhere's official new vocalist.

=== Rebel-Revive and Kyle's Departure (2012–2015) ===
In December 2012, Alternative Press premiered the lyric video for a new Jamie's Elsewhere song titled, "A Ghost With an Image", which was originally planned for the third album. Along with the new song, it was announced officially that Justin Kyle and Don Vedda had been added as touring vocalist and rhythm guitarist, respectively.

On October 12, 2013, Alternative Press premiered the new song, "Sick Fiction", which featured the debut of the band's new vocalist, Justin Kyle.

Justin Kyle and Jamie's Elsewhere went on tour in 2014 but were unable to finish the tour due to "various differences." Justin Kyle and Jamie's Elsewhere had not commented on their status until September 3, 2015, when Kyle announced on his Instagram that the band was officially broken up.

=== Reunion, 'They Said A Storm Was Coming' 10th Anniversary Tour and New Music (since 2020) ===
In a Twitter video uploaded to the official Jamie's Elsewhere Twitter account on April 26, 2020, frontman Aaron Pauley announced that the band are working on new music and were planning on a 10th anniversary tour for They Said A Storm Was Coming but due to the COVID-19 pandemic the tour has been pushed back to 2021. Alongside this a new line of merchandise was released.

On December 4, 2020, the band announced via Twitter a new song titled "The Soil and The Seed" will be released on December 11, 2020.

On June 21, 2023, the band released a new song titled "Escapist", also with an announcement about their new EP, "Paradise", that would be released on July 19, 2023. The EP has 5 new tracks.

On May 22nd, 2025, the band released a new single 'Traveler' accompanied by the announcement of a new EP entitled 'Alchemical,' to be released June 20th, 2025. The band also released a new music video for Traveler directed by filmmaker Mike Matsui.

== Musical style and lyrical themes ==
The band's musical style during A Guidebook crosses styles of hard rock, pop-punk, post-hardcore, and utilizes auto-tune. The lyrical content focuses on themes of "regrets, love, hate, happiness and forgiveness," however, the song titles often do not reflect these themes, as they instead are non sequitur.

With the release of They Said a Storm Was Coming, however, the band's sound had shifted radically to a more post-hardcore sound with some metalcore influences. The mix of screaming and singing remained the same as before, but the prominence of the keyboards and synthesizers had been increased drastically. The band's mixture of electronica and post-hardcore influences is often referred to as "electronicore." Accompanying these stylistic changes were conceptual changes. With the arrival of new vocalist Aaron Pauley, the song titles more directly reflected the lyrical content contained in each song as opposed to A Guidebook. Lyrically, the album also took a darker approach, and was a concept album written entirely by Pauley after expanding on a dream he had, revolving around a 15th-century mapmaker who is shipwrecked at sea and tries to come to terms with his mistake-filled past.

The band once more went through a stylistic transition with their album Rebel-Revive, adopting a more aggressive tone. The departure of Pauley to Of Mice & Men also led to another lyrical shift. Instead of utilizing conceptual and allegorical lyrics, new vocalist Justin Kyle shifted towards more concrete and personal content in his writing.

== Band members ==
Current

- Aaron Pauley – lead vocals and additional guitar (2008–2012, 2020–present)
- Matt Scarpelli – lead guitar (2005–2015, 2020–present); rhythm guitar (2011–2015, 2020–present); lead vocals (2014–2015)
- Chance Medeiros – bass (2008–2015, 2020–present)
- Mike Spearman – drums (2011–2013, 2020–present); keyboards, backing vocals (2005–2015, 2020–present)

Former

- Chris Jive - lead vocals (2005-2007)
- Tony Gambino - lead vocals (2006-2007)
- Anthony Carioscia – rhythm/lead guitar (2005–2008)
- Nick Rodriguez – bass (2005–2008)
- Anthony Scarpelli – drums (2005–2008)
- Chris Paterson – lead vocals (2007–2008)
- Mike Wellnitz – rhythm guitar (2008–2011)
- Scott Daby – drums (2008–2011)
- Justin Kyle – lead vocals (2012–2014)
- Don Vedda - guitar (2011–2014)
- Zach Wasmundt – drums (2013–2015)

Touring

- Gabe Amavizca – drums (2013)

Timeline

== Discography ==
=== Albums ===
- Guidebook for Sinners Turned Saints (2008)
- They Said a Storm Was Coming (2010)
- Rebel-Revive (2014)

=== EPs ===
- Goodbye Rocket Man, St. George Is Under Fire (2007)
- Unreleased Sessions E.P. (2009)
- Reimagined (2012)
- Paradise (2023)
- Alchemical (2025)

== Videography ==
- "I Didn't Mean to Interrupt ..."
- "Giants Among Common Men"
- "They Said a Storm Was Coming"
- "Antithesis (Live Video)"
- "Sleepless Nights (Live Video)"
- "Back Stabber"*
- "Traveler"*
