= Of Mice & Men (band) =

American rock band

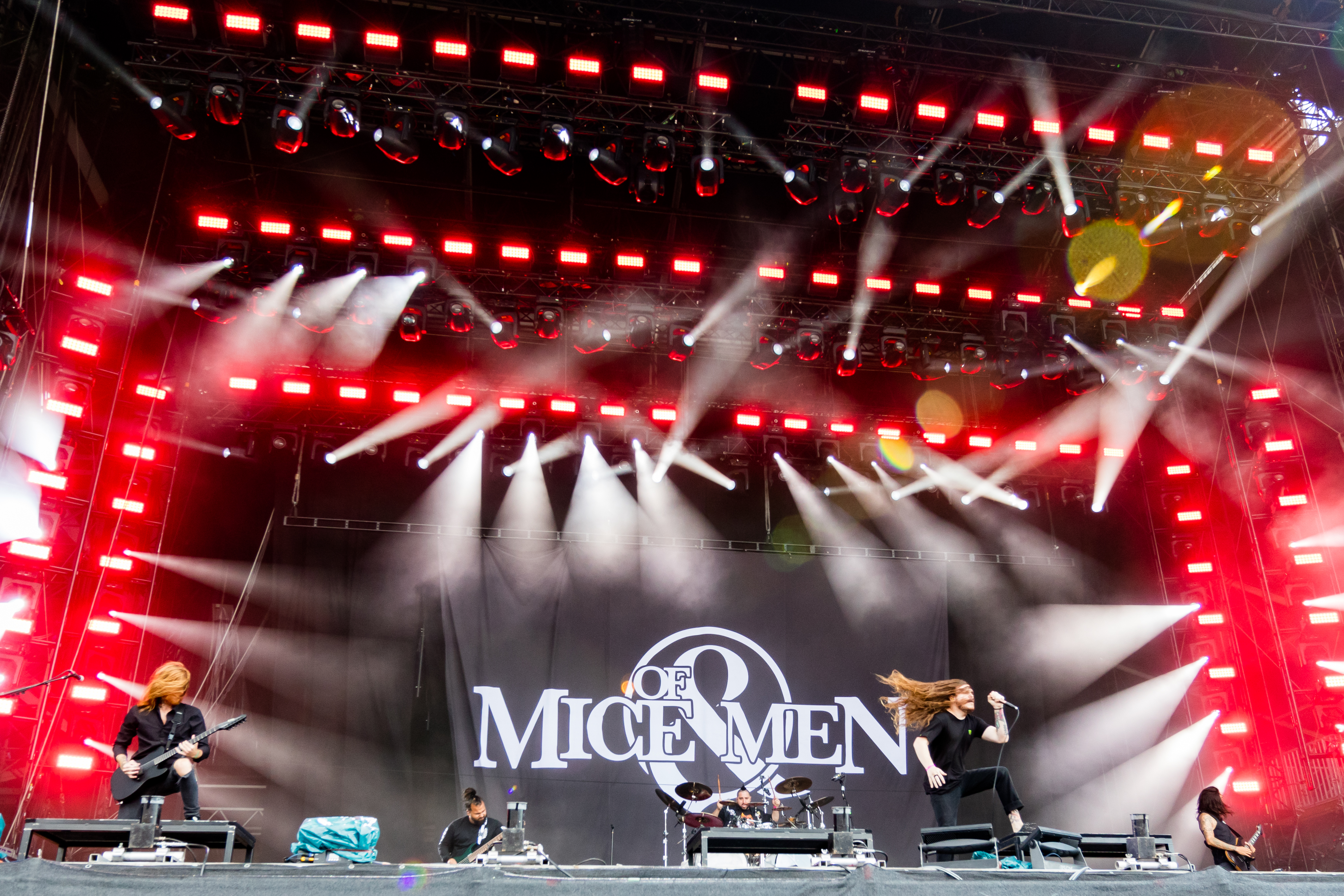
- Of Mice & Men performing at Wacken Open Air in 2019

Background information
- Origin: Costa Mesa, California, U.S.
- Genres: Metalcore; post-hardcore; nu metal; alternative metal; hard rock
- Works: Of Mice & Men discography
- Years active: 2009–present
- Labels: Rise; SharpTone; Century Media
- Spinoffs: Dayshell
- Spinoff of: Attack Attack!
- Members: Valentino Arteaga; Phil Manansala; Alan Ashby; Aaron Pauley
- Past members: Jonathan Kintz; Jaxin Hall; Jerry Roush; Shayley Bourget; Austin Carlile
- Website: ofmiceandmenofficial.com

Of Mice & Men (often abbreviated OM&M) is an American rock band formed in Costa Mesa, California, in 2009. The band's line-up currently consists of drummer Valentino Arteaga, guitarists Phil Manansala and Alan Ashby, and bassist and lead vocalist Aaron Pauley. The group was founded by former lead vocalist Austin Carlile and former bassist Jaxin Hall in mid-2009 after Carlile's departure from Attack Attack!. Carlile departed from the band in December 2016 citing that a long-term health condition prompted his exit. After Carlile's departure, the band continued to pursue creating music with Pauley as the band's bassist and lead vocalist.

Since 2009, the band has released nine studio albums: Of Mice & Men (2010), The Flood (2011), Restoring Force (2014), Cold World (2016), Defy (2018), Earthandsky (2019), Echo (2021), Tether (2023), and Another Miracle (2025). Of Mice & Men's earlier music has been described as metalcore and post-hardcore. Their later material has introduced more melodic notes and mixed in genres such as nu metal and alternative metal while retaining their original sound.

The band has played international music festivals including the Vans Warped Tour in 2010, 2011, 2012, 2014, and 2025 and the Soundwave Music Festival in 2013 and 2015.

== History ==
=== Formation and debut album (2009–2010) ===
Of Mice & Men was founded by Austin Carlile, the original vocalist of Attack Attack!, and bassist Jaxin Hall, an import from Auckland, New Zealand during 2009 in Columbus, Ohio. Carlile and Hall searched for other members for about a month. According to Carlile in an interview, Carlile's desktop background was none other than Valentino Arteaga, drummer of Lower Definition, and Jon Kintz of Odd Project. Carlile was amazed when Arteaga was interested in playing drums for the band after being sent an invite over email. The trio then added Phil Manansala, a touring guitarist for A Static Lullaby and the line-up was set. Carlile and Hall moved to Southern California to join the others. A little while later, Kintz was cut from the band and replaced with Shayley Bourget. With a question at hand asking of the departure of Kintz in a Q&A for the group, Bourget jokingly stated, "Jon didn't cut it." On Kintz's part, he reportedly cited that the band felt he was "partying too much." After reaching 1,000,000 plays from their Myspace profile in just two months since its launch, the band uploaded a cover of Lady Gaga's song "Poker Face". The song was mastered by Tom Denney, formerly of A Day to Remember and a copy of the demo was sent directly to Rise Records. Recognizing the band as Carlile's new musical project, Of Mice & Men was signed to the label. The group then traveled to the Foundation Studios in Connersville, Indiana on July 14, 2009, with Joey Sturgis to record their self-titled debut album.

On December 6, 2009, they had two video shoots in Ventura, California, for "Those in Glass Houses" and "Second & Sebring". The band released their debut album on March 9, 2010. The original release date was February 23, but the album was forced into a delay. A month before the official release, the album was leaked on February 10 by fans who hacked into the system. The music video for "Second & Sebring" was released on Hot Topic's website and made its television premiere on Headbangers Ball on March 15, 2010.

The band joined the "Squash the Beef Tour" supporting Dance Gavin Dance, along with Emarosa, Tides of Man, and Of Machines. Also in 2009, Of Mice & Men was support on the "Atticus Tour" along with Finch, Blessthefall, Drop Dead, Gorgeous, Vanna, and Let's Get It. After completion of the "Atticus Tour", the band supported I See Stars on the "Leave It to the Suits Tour" with We Came as Romans, Broadway, and Covendetta.

=== Departure of Carlile and Hall (2010–2011) ===
Jerry Roush, who was formerly a part of Sky Eats Airplane, soon became a permanent addition to Of Mice & Men. Originally, Roush was a substitute for Austin Carlile on the Emptiness Tour in 2010 which featured the band along with Alesana, A Skylit Drive, the Word Alive, and We Came as Romans. Carlile required a heart surgery performed in the near future and was forced to not tour by his doctor. At the same time, Carlile fell into a conflict with the other members. Through much deliberation, the band and Carlile decided to part ways. The group thereafter invited Roush to front Of Mice & Men. The band was featured on the cover for the 19th issue of Substream Music Press shortly after this decision. After the Emptiness Tour, Of Mice & Men supported Attack Attack! on the "This Is A Family Tour" with In Fear and Faith, Pierce the Veil, and Emmure.

Months after Roush joined the band, bassist, Jaxin Hall left the group on August 23, 2010. Hall explained that the reasons for this decision were made to concentrate more on his personal life, as well as his clothing brand, Love Before Glory. Dane Poppin of A Static Lullaby, the former band for Phil, substituted as a bassist for Of Mice & Men's then upcoming tour dates after Hall's departure. The group was included in the Punk Goes... compilation, Punk Goes Pop Volume 03., covering the R&B song, "Blame It" by Jamie Foxx with Poppin on bass and is the only recording by the band to feature Roush's vocals. The band participated in Warped Tour 2010. Shortly after the conclusion of Warped Tour, Of Mice & Men toured the UK in support of August Burns Red and Blessthefall.

=== Carlile's return with Ashby and The Flood (2011–2012) ===
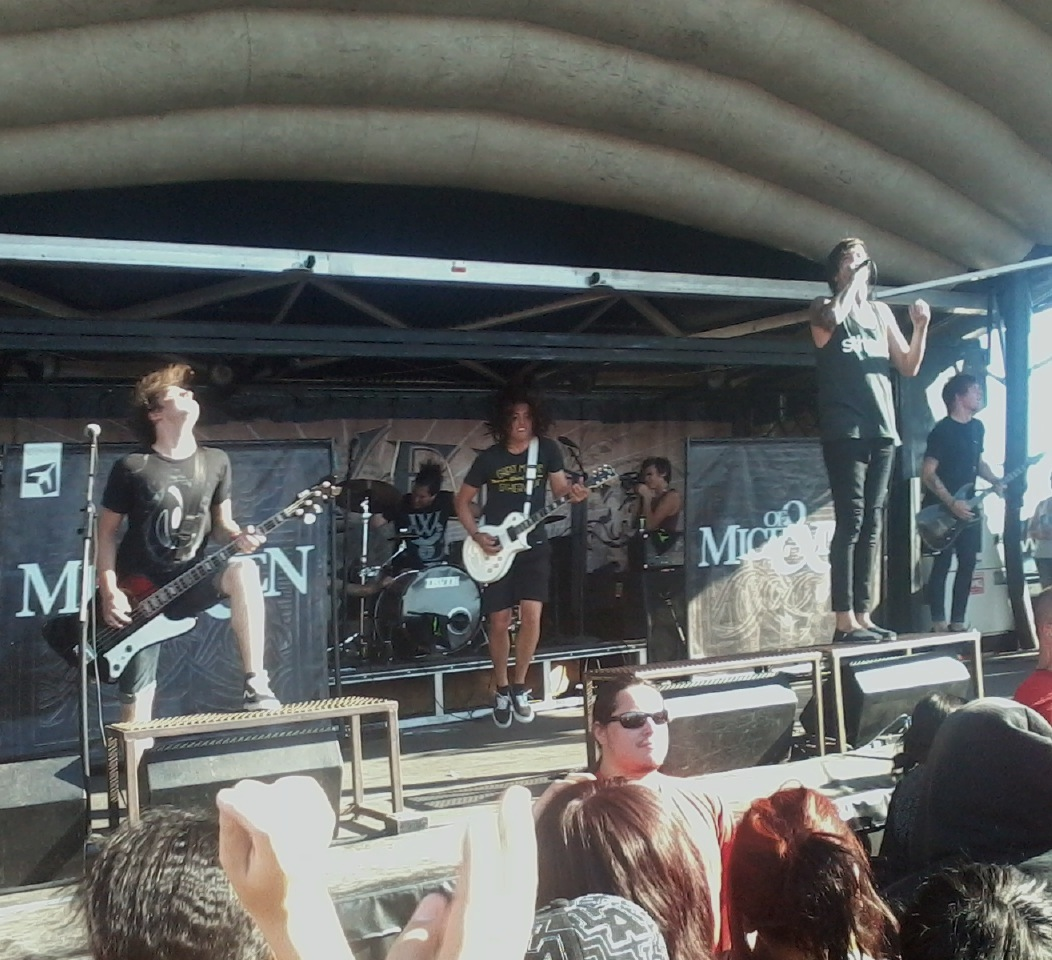
Of Mice & Men performing live on the Vans Warped Tour in 2011

Leading onto Roush being a part of the band for already nine months, the group confirmed on January 3, 2011, that they reached a decision to have Jerry Roush leave Of Mice & Men in favor for former vocalist and founding member, Austin Carlile, to return to the group. Roush posted an extended response to his firing from the band on his Twitter account. Carlile was under an intention for months to start a new musical project, with fellow musician Alan Ashby, until his request to return to the group was made. Carlile and Ashby were then both accepted into Of Mice & Men, with Ashby as an entirely new member. The group then underwent a slight arrangement, as they required a bassist after several substitutions to which Dane Poppin, of A Static Lullaby, contributed. Poppin's needed return to A Static Lullaby after extensive touring with Of Mice & Men had the group move Shayley Bourget from rhythm guitar to bass guitar, but remain at clean vocals. Alan Ashby was employed as rhythm guitarist.

The refreshed band began the recording process of their second album titled The Flood in late January 2011. Shortly after the album's completion, the band headlined the 2011 annual "Artery Across the Nation Tour" with support from Woe, Is Me, Sleeping with Sirens, I Set My Friends on Fire, and the Amity Affliction. The band toured Europe and Australia in support of the Amity Affliction, along with I Killed the Prom Queen, and Deez Nuts. They also later supported Asking Alexandria on a short four-day UK tour along with While She Sleeps.

On May 13, 2011, Of Mice & Men released a brand new single entitled, "Still YDG'N". Also, on May 24, they released a second song entitled, "Purified". "Purified" has been added to the 2011 installment of Sideonedummy's annual Warped Tour compilation. The Flood was released June 14, 2011.

Of Mice & Men participated on all of the Warped Tour 2011. They were joined by former bassist Jaxin Hall on select California dates for "Second & Sebring". From September 13, 2011, until October 14, 2011, Of Mice & Men supported We Came as Romans on the "I'm Alive Tour" along with Miss May I, Texas in July, and Close to Home. Afterward, the group headlined the "Monster Energy Outbreak Tour" with Iwrestledabearonce, I See Stars, Abandon All Ships, and That's Outrageous!. For the Fallen Dreams was also included on the first half of the tour. Devin Oliver (I See Stars) and Christopher Stewart (That's Outrageous!) filled in on clean vocals after the departure of Bourget midway through the tour.

=== Departure of Shayley Bourget and The Flood Deluxe Reissue (2012) ===
In 2012, the group announced that they were returning to the studio to begin work on their third release. On February 9, the announcement of Bourget's departure from the band was released to the public via Facebook and YouTube. Bourget had also released a video statement on YouTube, stating the reasons he had to discontinue with the band. He suffered from depression and alcoholism, along with other personal problems, and felt that he was bringing the other band members down. Bourget stated he will not be returning to the band, and has since been the lead vocalist for Dayshell.

On March 2, the band announced via Facebook that Austin Carlile would be taking over on all vocals for Of Mice & Men's third studio album. On March 25, Confide drummer/vocalist Joel Piper announced he would be filling in on bass for the next run of shows. A reissue of The Flood was released on July 24, 2012. It contains two discs, featuring four brand new tracks. For Vans Warped Tour 2012, Aaron Pauley of Jamie's Elsewhere substituted on bass guitar and clean vocals. Pauley has since stated that he is no longer a band member of Jamie's Elsewhere, but he did not leave on bad terms.

=== Arrival of Pauley, Restoring Force and Live at Brixton (2012–2016) ===
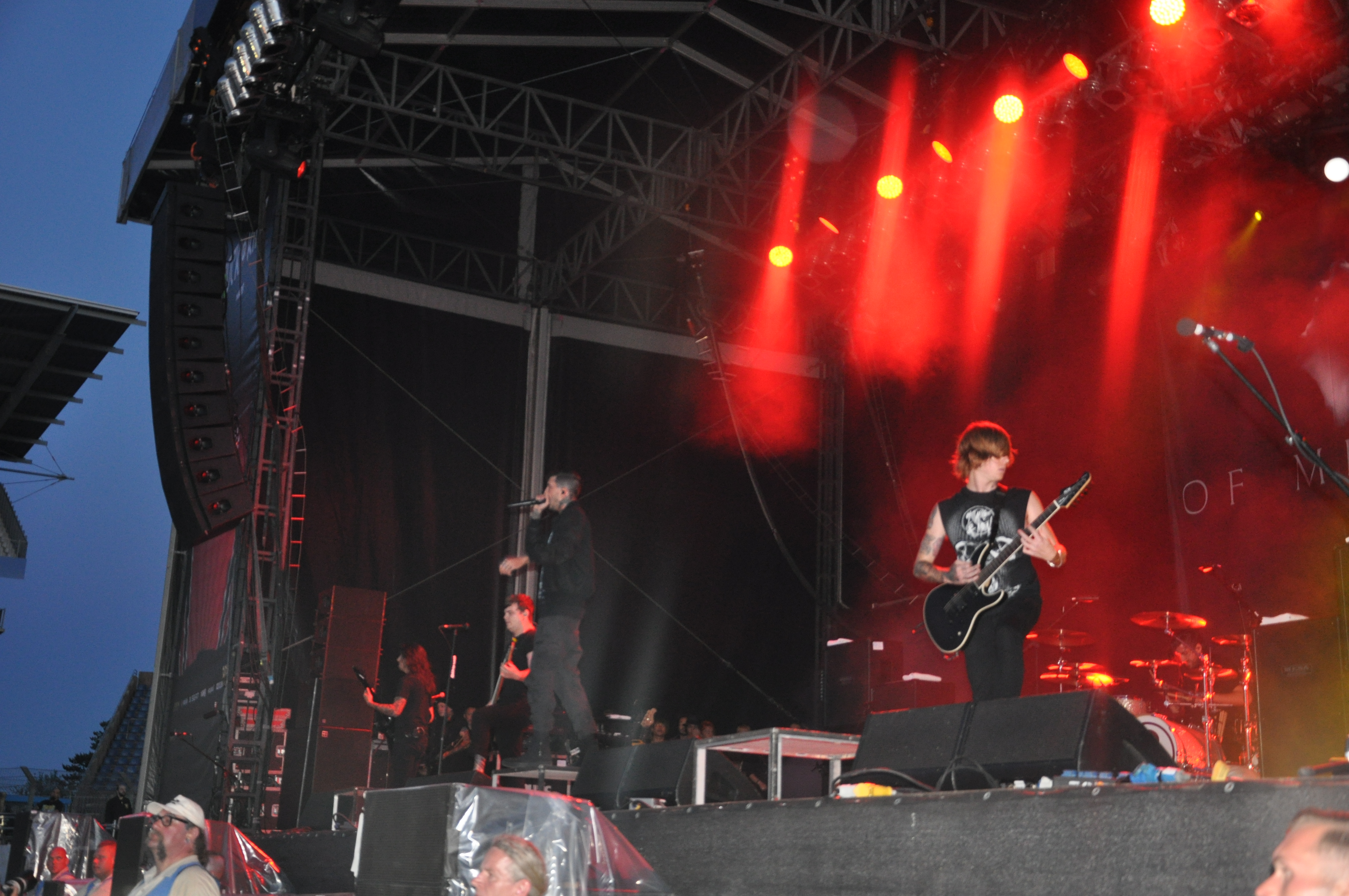
Of Mice & Men at Rock am Ring 2014

On December 4, 2012, the band indicated they were writing material for their next album, Stating "we are currently home from tour for the remainder of 2012 and are now back in our studio working on our brand new album!" The band entered the studio in June 2013 to begin pre-production on the album with producer David Bendeth. On October 1, 2013, it was announced that the band had finished tracking for their new album, having spent the summer in New Jersey recording the album, with David Bendeth, who was in the processing of mixing the album. On October 17, 2013, Alternative Press released the first studio video and announced the completion of the band's third album.

On November 26, the band released a teaser for a big announcement to come the following day. The next day, the band announced their third studio album named Restoring Force, due for release on January 24, 2014, in North America. They also announced dates for a UK headlining tour in April 2014 with Issues and Beartooth.

On December 2, the band released their first single from Restoring Force. The single, "You're Not Alone", is the band's first release with new bassist and clean vocalist Aaron Pauley. They announced that "Bones Exposed" would be the next song released from the new album; it was released on December 23. After the album was released, the band toured as a support act for British metalcore band Bring Me the Horizon, along with metalcore band Issues, on the "American Dream Tour" throughout America, starting early February and finishing in late March. Once the tour finished, the band headlined in the UK, with Issues and Beartooth supporting them throughout April.

A music video for the third single of the album "Would You Still Be There" was released on May 15, 2014. Starting from May 23, the band supported A Day to Remember in Latin America, finishing in early June. In July, it was announced that the band will be the main support for the rock band Linkin Park on their European tour in November.

On October 8, 2014, the band posted photos of them back in the studio with David Bendeth on Twitter. On October 23, the band released a music video for the song "Feels Like Forever". On December 16, a deluxe edition of Restoring Force was announced entitled Restoring Force: Full Circle, which will include three new tracks and an acoustic version of "Feels Like Forever", and is set to be released on February 24, 2015. On February 5, 2015, the band premiered a new single "Broken Generation", with an accompanying music video. The following day, the single was available to listen to through streaming library Spotify. On May 27, 2016, the band released their first live album, titled Live at Brixton.

=== Cold World and Carlile's second departure (2016–2017) ===
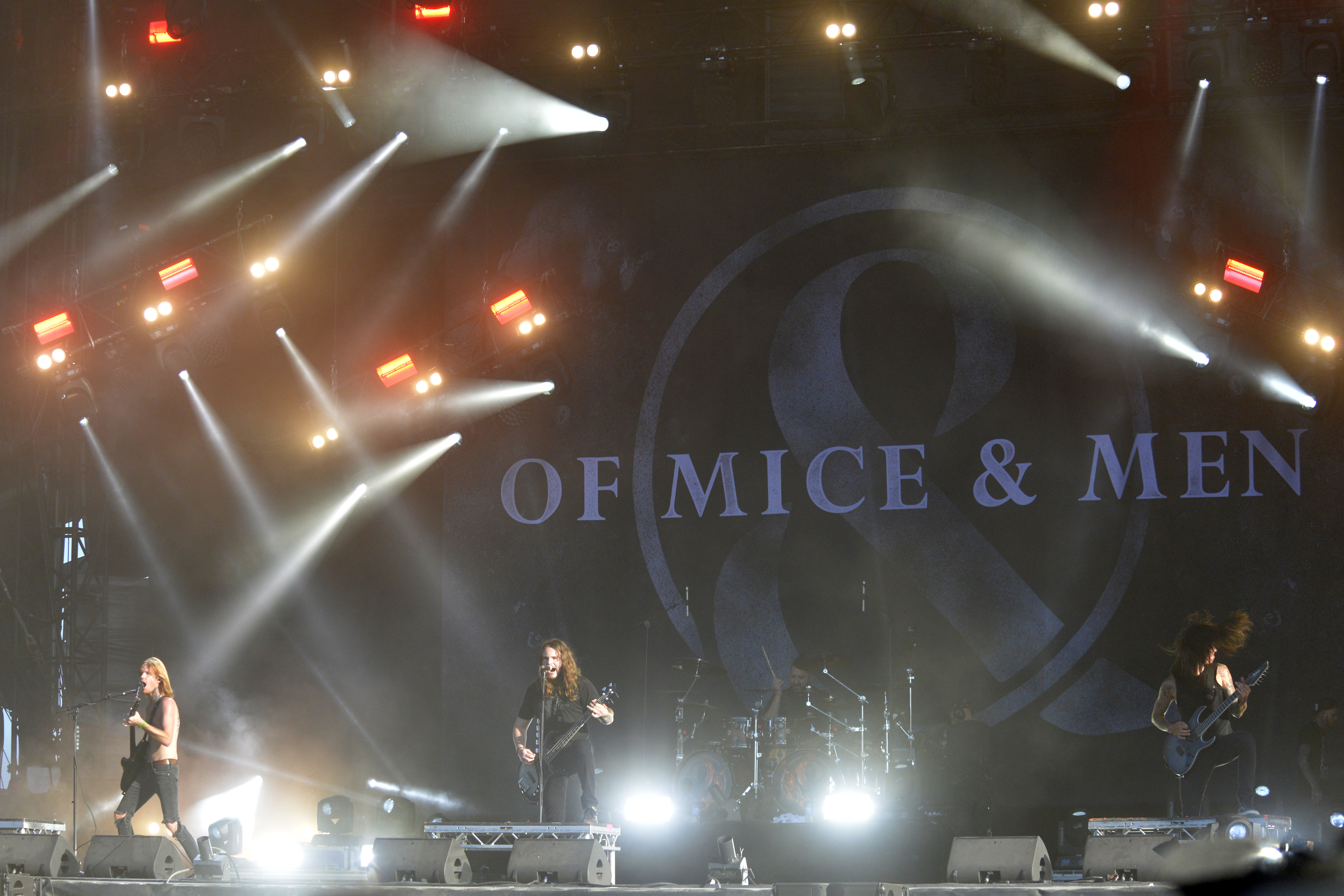
Of Mice & Men at Hellfest 2017

On June 28, 2016, the band announced their fourth studio album, Cold World, which was released on September 9, 2016, through Rise Records. On the same day, they released the album's lead single, "Pain", accompanied with its music video. On August 4, the band released the second single of the album titled "Real" and its corresponding music video. On August 30, the band released the third and final single of the album titled "Contagious".

On December 30, Austin Carlile posted on his Instagram that he's leaving the band to focus on healing and getting better while moving to Costa Rica, leaving the band with only two of its founding members remaining. It was also revealed on February 17, 2017, that one of the other reasons Carlile had left the band was because he wasn't allowed to write what he wanted on the next record. In a reply to an Instagram comment about whether or not he would be working with Of Mice & Men in the future, he said "No I will no longer be writing with them, one of the reasons I left. They weren't going to let me write what I wanted on next record. That's not gonna happen. I will write what I want despite what that means giving up."

=== Defy (2017–2018) ===
The band performed without former vocalist Carlile on April 21, 2017, at the Las Rageous Festival in Las Vegas. Three days later, on April 24, the band released the single "Unbreakable," and "Back to Me" on May 22. marking their first singles with Pauley as lead vocalist.

Of Mice & Men released a short documentary on YouTube titled after the first track after Carlile's departure, "Unbreakable". The documentary addressed the struggles and triumphs of the band after losing a vital part of the show. Directed by Johann Ramos depicting the band's touring schedule in early 2017. This 'Unbreakable' film shows Of Mice & Men on their latest festival performances across multiple continents performing their songs & giving audiences an inside look at their touring regiment.

On November 10, 2017, the band released the third single with Pauley on vocals, titled "Warzone". Along with the release of "Warzone", the band announced their first complete record with Pauley as lead vocalist titled Defy. Weeks later, the band released the title track, "Defy", on November 27, 2017. The fifth single, a cover of Pink Floyd's "Money", was released worldwide on January 12, 2018. On January 19, Defy was released worldwide.

=== Earthandsky (2018–2021) ===
On October 10, 2018, Aaron Pauley announced that the band is working on a new album with producer Josh Wilbur. Pauley has also stated that the new record will be 'heavier' compared to Defy. On February 14, 2019, the band released a new song called "How to Survive" which, as they stated, sounded much heavier than tracks from their previous album Defy. On May 3, the band released another new song titled "Mushroom Cloud" and its corresponding music video. On June 26, DJ and producer Kayzo along with other artist Yultron released a collaboration track with the band titled "Night Terror" marking the band's first collaboration with other artists.

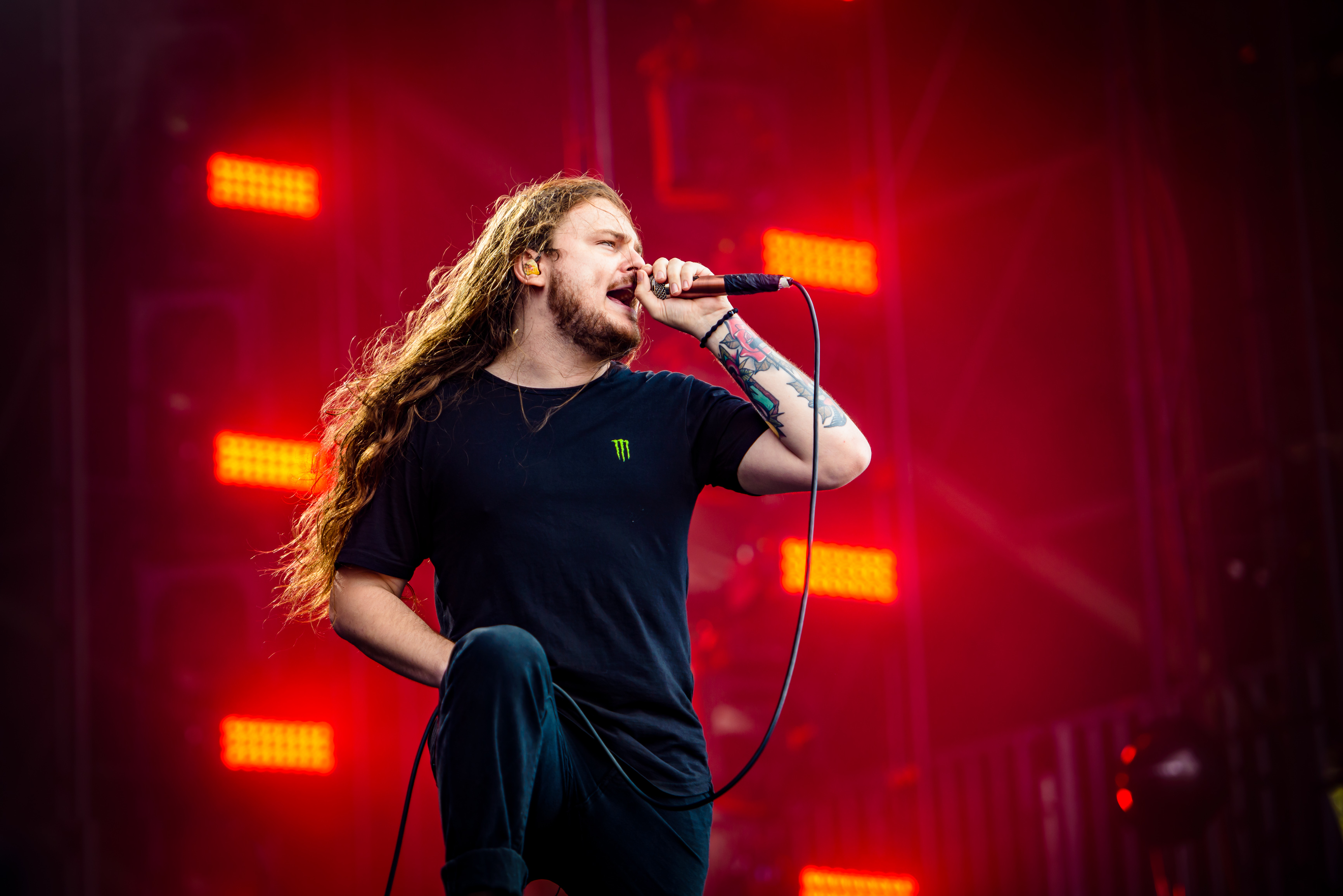
Lead vocalist Aaron Pauley performing in 2019

On July 26, the band announced their new album titled Earthandsky set for release on September 27, 2019. They also released the title track and video for "Earth & Sky". On September 5, the band released the fourth single of the album titled "Taste of Regret" along with an accompanying music video.

=== New label, EP trilogy and Echo (2021–2022) ===
On January 13, 2021, the band revealed that they had parted ways with Rise Records and signed with SharpTone Records. At the same time, they released a new single "Obsolete" and announced that their debut EP, Timeless, would be released on February 26, 2021. On January 18, Pauley announced via Twitter that this would be the first of three EPs released in the year. On February 10, two weeks before the EP release, the band released the title track "Timeless". On April 21, the band announced that their second EP, Bloom, would be released on May 28, 2021. That same day, they unveiled a new single and title track "Bloom".

On September 29, the band released a brand new single "Mosaic". On October 19, the band released the single "Fighting Gravity" and announced that their third EP, Ad Infinitum, was set for release on December 3, 2021. The group also surprise announced their seventh studio album, Echo, which was released along with the EP and compiles all three EPs that were released throughout the year. At the same time, they revealed the album cover and the track list. On November 24, one week before the EP and album release, the band unveiled the title track of the record.

=== Tether (2023–2025) ===
On February 12, 2023, Of Mice & Men announced through social media that they have nearly wrapped up the material for their eighth studio album. On July 9, the band shared a video online, features behind the scenes footage from a recent video shoot, including a photo shoot. On July 17, they revealed Tether as the title of their eighth studio album. On the same day, the band confirmed that the first single titled "Warpaint" would be released on July 28. On July 28, the band revealed the album would be released on October 6. On August 23, the band released the second single "Castaway" along with an accompanying music video.

On September 20, three weeks before the album release, the band released the third single "Indigo". The music video for "Into the Sun" was released October 6, 2023, coinciding with the album release.

=== Another Miracle (2025–present) ===
On May 8, 2025, the band released the single, "Another Miracle", as well as their signing to Century Media Records. On July 10, 2025, the band announced their upcoming ninth studio album, Another Miracle, set to be released on November 14, 2025. On the same day, the album's second single, "Wake Up", was released.

== Musical style and influences ==
Of Mice & Men have been described as metalcore, hard rock, post-hardcore, nu metal, nu metalcore, alternative metal, melodic metalcore, heavy metal, alternative rock and melodic hardcore. The band's debut self-titled album has been considered a typical metalcore album comparable with the work of the Devil Wears Prada, We Came as Romans, and Austin Carlile's former band Attack Attack!, and to contain elements of post-hardcore Their second album, The Flood, was described as atypical to modern metalcore and more melodic than their earlier work, and as featuring some nu metal songs. Their third album, Restoring Force, incorporated a lot more nu metal elements into their sound, with a Rock Sound review describing the album's style as a mixture of nu metal and metalcore. Their fourth album, Cold World, saw them embracing the nu metal sound heard from Restoring Force with the album taking influence from early-2000s nu metal. Their fifth album, Defy, marked the first album without founding vocalist Austin Carlile with the band's bassist Aaron Pauley taking over both clean and unclean vocals. The album also marked the return to their heavy sound, however still keeping elements from their fourth album.

The band's style employs a contrast between harsh vocals and standard singing. Currently, frontman/bassist Aaron Pauley performs both techniques.

Of Mice & Men's influences include bands such as Alice in Chains, Deftones, Incubus, Korn, Limp Bizkit, Linkin Park, Papa Roach, P.O.D., Rage Against the Machine, Slipknot, Staind, Pressure 4-5, Emmure, As I Lay Dying, Norma Jean, Converge, Lamb of God, Guns N' Roses, Blink-182, Green Day, Sigur Rós, Mansions, Alanis Morissette, The Mars Volta, and Tool.

== Band name ==
When asked about the band's name origin, former vocalist Austin Carlile responded with:

"The book Of Mice and Men says 'the well laid plans of mice and men often falter.' You make plans, and they get screwed up. [Jaxin Hall] and I both had plans for life, and they both got screwed up, so now we're making the most of what we can."

Former bassist Jaxin Hall also commented, stating:

"The main theme of [Of Mice and Men] is the American Dream [...] and being self sufficient [...] As a band, I was thinking about that when Austin and I were thinking about forming this band that we wanted this to be our American Dream, especially considering that I'm not from America [...] So this was to be our self sufficient thing that we could live off and make our own and achieve this dream. [...] So I looked at things that happened with [past relationships] and that everyone had the best intentions with things, and that they didn't quite work out the way we wanted it to."

== Band members ==
Of Mice & Men live at Wacken Open Air 2019

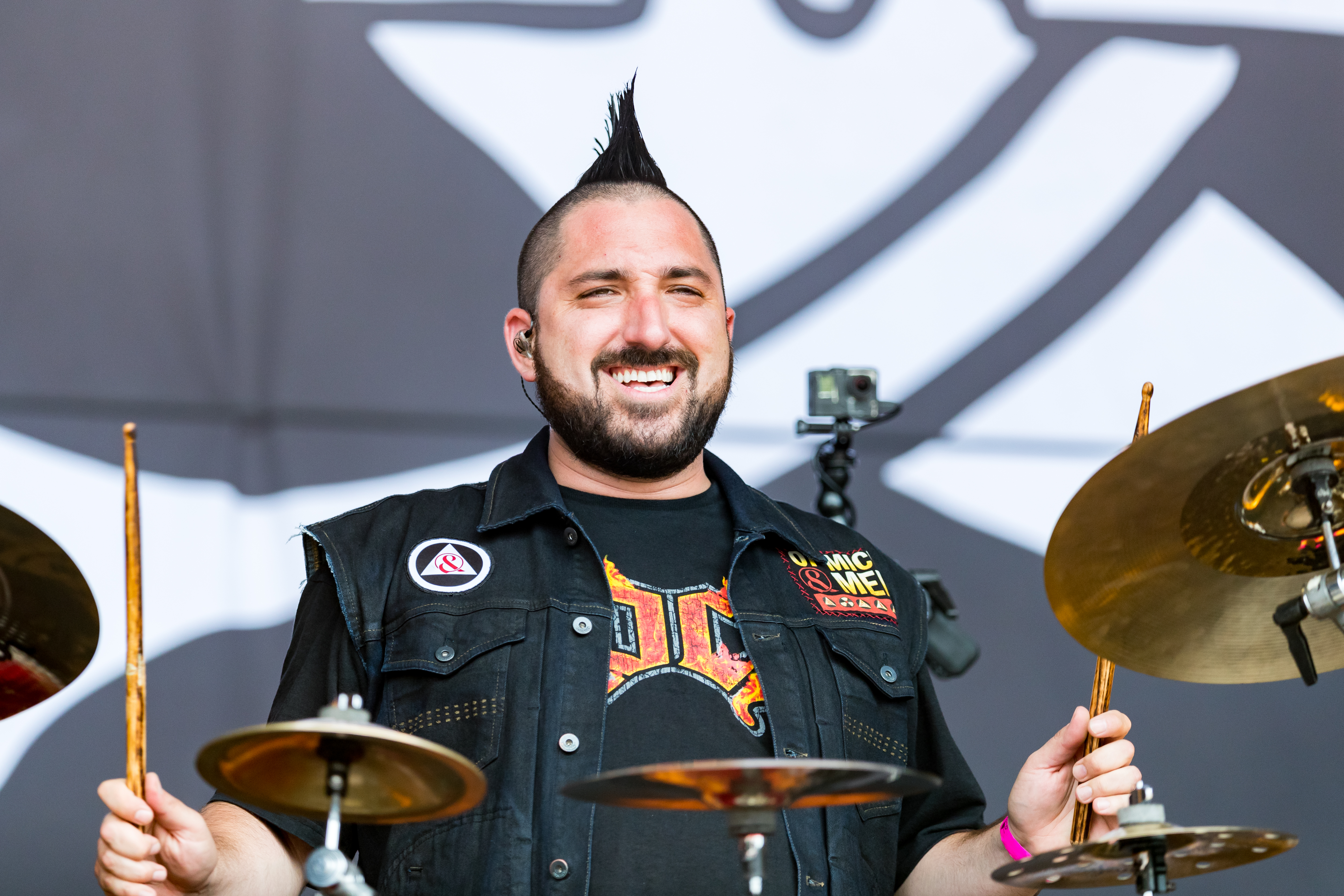
Drummer Valentino Arteaga

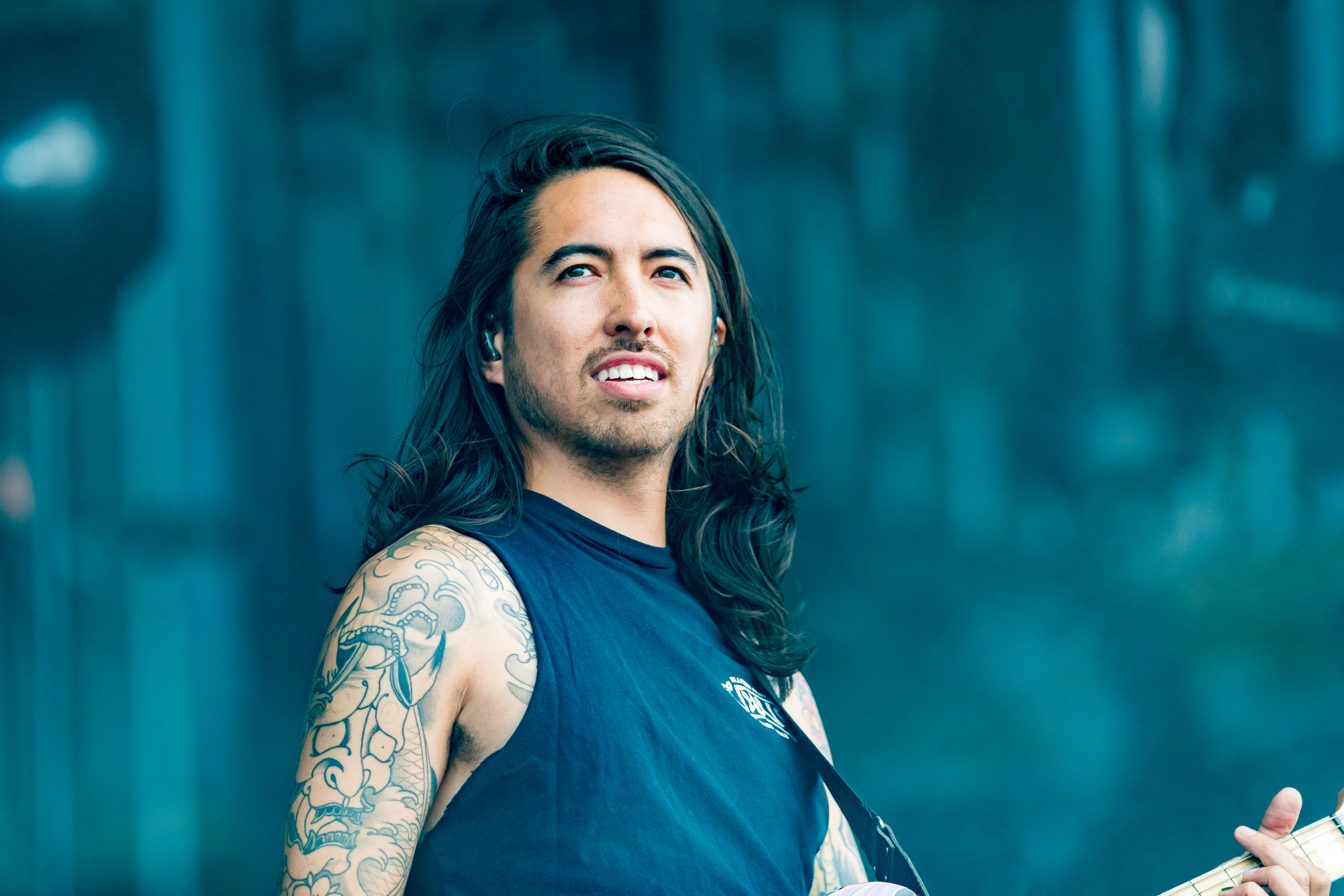
Lead guitarist Phil Manansala

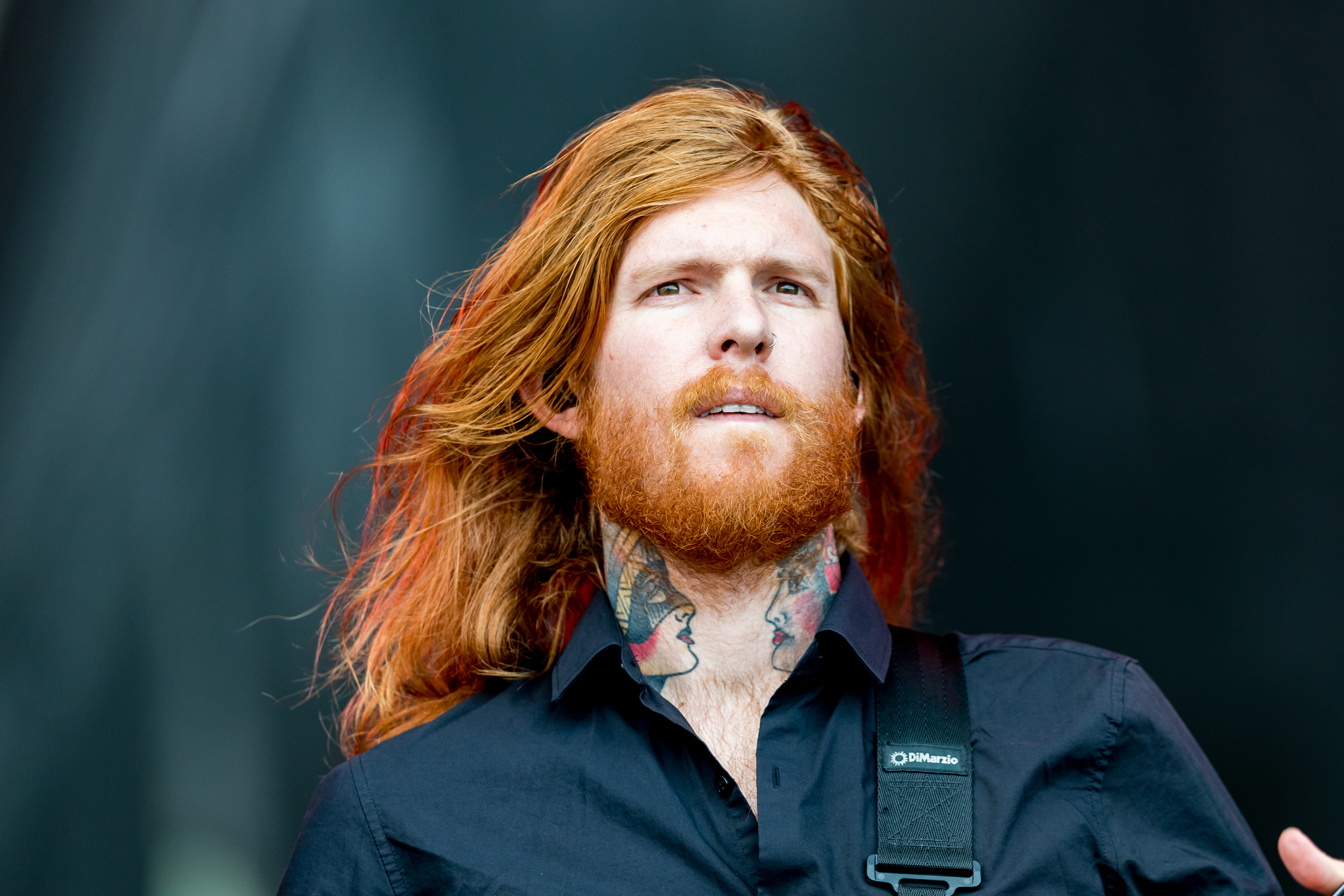
Rhythm guitarist Alan Ashby

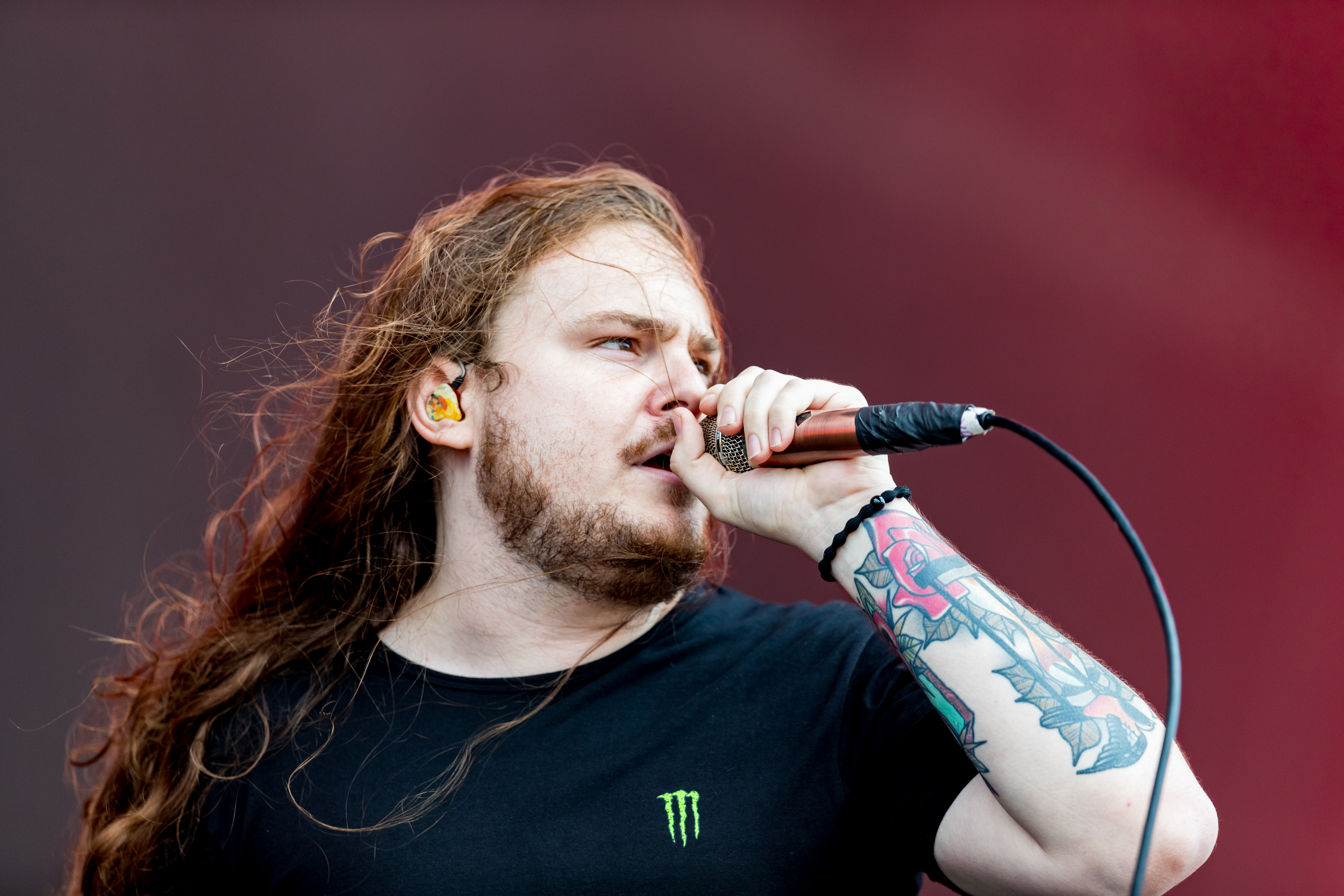
Lead singer and bassist Aaron Pauley

Current

- David Valentino "Tino" Arteaga – drums, percussion (2009–present)
- Phil Manansala – lead guitar (2009–present), backing vocals (2016–present)
- Alan Ashby – rhythm guitar (2011–present), backing vocals (2016–present); bass (2011–2012)
- Aaron Pauley – clean vocals, bass (2012–present), lead vocals (2016–present)

Former

- Jaxin Hall – bass, backing vocals (2009–2010); clean vocals (2009)
- Austin Carlile – unclean vocals (2009–2010; 2011–2016), clean vocals (2012–2016)
- Jerry Roush – unclean vocals (2010–2011)
- Jonathan Kintz – clean vocals, rhythm guitar (2009)
- Shayley Bourget – clean vocals (2009–2012); rhythm guitar (2009–2011); bass (2010–2012)

Touring

- Raad Soudani – bass (2019–2022)
- Dane Poppin – bass (2010–2011)
- Devin Oliver – clean vocals (2011)
- Justin Trotta – bass (2011, 2012)
- Joel Piper – clean vocals, bass (2012)

Timeline

== Discography ==
Studio albums

- Of Mice & Men (2010)
- The Flood (2011)
- Restoring Force (2014)
- Cold World (2016)
- Defy (2018)
- Earthandsky (2019)
- Echo (2021)
- Tether (2023)
- Another Miracle (2025)

== Tours ==
Year	Name	Description
2009	Squash the Beef Tour	Participated with Dance Gavin Dance, Emarosa, Tides of Man, and Of Machines.
2009	Atticus Tour 2009	Participated with Finch, Blessthefall, Drop Dead, Gorgeous, Vanna, and Let's Get It.
2009	Leave It to the Suits Tour	Participated with I See Stars, We Came as Romans, and Broadway.
2009	The Emptiness Tour	Participated with Alesana, A Skylit Drive, the Word Alive, and We Came as Romans.
2010	The Rise Records Tour	Participated with the Bled, In Fear and Faith, and the Color Morale.
2010	Vans Warped Tour 2010	Played on the Skullcandy Stage.
2010	European Tour 2010	Participated with August Burns Red and Blessthefall.
2010	This Is a Family Tour	Participated with Attack Attack!, Pierce the Veil, In Fear and Faith and Emmure.
2011	Artery Across the Nation Tour	Headlined with support from I Set My Friends on Fire, Sleeping with Sirens, Woe, Is Me, and the Amity Affliction.
2011	European Tour 2011	Participated with Asking Alexandria and While She Sleeps on a short four-day tour.
2011	Destroy Music Tour	Participated with the Amity Affliction, I Killed the Prom Queen and Deez Nuts.
2011	Vans Warped Tour 2011	Participated in the whole tour.
2011	Monster Energy Outbreak Tour	Headlined with support from Iwrestledabearonce, Abandon All Ships, and I See Stars.
2011	Decade of Destruction Tour	Co-headlined with As I Lay Dying, along with the Ghost Inside, Iwrestledabearonce, and Sylosis as supports.
2012	European Tour 2012	Headlined with support acts Bury Tomorrow, Crossfaith and With One Last Breath.
2012	Vans Warped Tour 2012	Performed on the Kia Soul Stage.
2012	UK Tour	Headlined a UK tour with support from Memphis May Fire, and Secrets.
2013	Soundwave Music Festival 2013	Participated in a nationwide tour of Australia.
2013	Right Back at It Again Tour	Participated with A Day to Remember, Chunk! No, Captain Chunk!, Issues and Pierce the Veil.
2014	American Dream Tour	Toured North America, Canada and Mexico as main support to Bring Me the Horizon, with support from Issues, Letlive and Northlane.
2014	European Tour 2014	Headline shows across the UK and Europe, showcasing material from Restoring Force.
2014	Latin American Tour 2014	Supporting A Day to Remember on selected dates in South America.
2014	Vans Warped Tour 2014	Playing selected dates throughout.
2015	The Hunting Party Tour 2015	Special guests and playing with Linkin Park and Rise Against.
2015	Soundwave Music Festival 2015	Participated in a nationwide tour of Australia.
2015	Restoring Force Full Circle Tour	Full tour of Europe, South America and part of US before Carlile was rushed to hospital on May 30, 2015, support from the Amity Affliction and Volumes.
2016	.5 The Gray Chapter Tour	Special guests and playing with Slipknot and Marilyn Manson.
2017	5FDP European Tour	Special guests and playing with Five Finger Death Punch and In Flames.
2018	The Defy Tour	Support from Blessthefall, Cane Hill, and Fire from the Gods.
2019	The Truth Tour	With Badflower and Palisades.
2019	Earth & Sky Tour	With For the Fallen Dreams, Thousand Below, Bloodbather, and RVNT.

== Awards and nominations ==
Alternative Press Music Awards

Year	Nominee / work	Award	Result
2014	Phil Manansala	Best Guitarist	Won
2014	Of Mice & Men	Artist of the Year	Nominated
2015	Of Mice & Men	Artist of the Year	Nominated

Kerrang! Awards

Year	Nominee / work	Award	Result
2013	Of Mice & Men	Best International Newcomer	Won
