= Earthandsky =

Studio album by Of Mice & Men
- Released: September 27, 2019
- Recorded: 2018–2019
- Studios: Hybrid Studios, Santa Ana, California
- Genres: Metalcore; melodic metalcore; hard rock; heavy metal; melodic hardcore
- Length: 43:40
- Label: Rise
- Producer: Josh Wilbur

Of Mice & Men chronology
Defy (2018)	Earthandsky (2019)	Timeless (2021)

Singles from Earthandsky
- 1. "How to Survive" Released: February 14, 2019; 2. "Mushroom Cloud" Released: May 3, 2019; 3. "Earth & Sky" Released: July 26, 2019; 4. "Taste of Regret" Released: September 5, 2019

Digital cover
- Artwork used on digital streaming and download services.

Earthandsky (stylized in all caps; read as Earth and Sky, sometimes referred as Earth & Sky) is the sixth studio album by American rock band Of Mice & Men. It was released on September 27, 2019, through Rise Records. The album was produced by Josh Wilbur and is the follow-up to the group's fifth album, Defy (2018). It is their last album to be released on this label before the band signed to SharpTone Records in 2021. It sold 4,000 copies in the US in its first week.

== Background and promotion ==
On October 10, 2018, Aaron Pauley announced that the band is working on a new album with producer Josh Wilbur. Pauley has also stated that the new record will be 'heavier' compared to Defy.

On February 14, 2019, the band released the first single of the album titled "How to Survive" which, as they stated, sounded much heavier than tracks from their previous album Defy.

On May 3, the band released the second single titled "Mushroom Cloud" and its corresponding music video.

On July 26, the band released the third single and title track "Earth & Sky" along with a music video.

On September 5, the band released the fourth single of the album titled "Taste of Regret" along with an accompanying music video.

== Critical reception ==
Professional ratings
Review scores
Source	Rating
AllMusic	4/5 stars
Alternative Press	(favorable)
Dead Press!	8/10 stars
Distorted Sound	9/10
Kerrang!	3/5 stars
Rock 'N' Load	10/10
Rock Sins	8/10
Wall of Sound	8.5/10

The album received mostly positive reviews from critics. AllMusic gave the album positive review and saying: "Earthandsky feels even more locked-in; an expertly crafted and undeniably hefty slab of grade-A melodic hardcore that plays fast and loose with genre tropes without losing any vitality in the process." Alternative Press gave the album a positive review and stated: "Of Mice & Men brought so much authenticity to Earthandsky by continuing to explore the realities of the mind. No two songs are the same. There's aggression, there's darkness and there's exploration of emotions. Then you get smacked with sonic heaviness, which fans can totally embrace and welcome to the OM&M repertoire."

Dead Press! gave the album a positive review saying: "With a determined mindset, Of Mice & Men may have proved on Defy that they can continue as a quartet, but with Earthandsky, the group display the ability to lead the next wave of metalcore." Distorted Sound stated that "Earthandsky is a hefty gift from Of Mice & Men. One could argue it's merely the "step-up" from Defy with an expected push into an even heavier direction, but pockets of surprises with songs that don't hold back in the experimental changes give them a unique, refreshing sound."

Kerrang! was a little less positive stating, "Whichever facet of Of Mice & Men first appealed to fans, they're catered for even more ably on Earthandsky than on its predecessor. It is an album as epic as its title, and proves that, although this is a band who have had to traverse more trouble than some, they will not be defeated by them." Rock 'N' Load praised the album saying, "Earthandsky feels like a natural progression for Of Mice & Men, showing just how far they've come as musicians in the last 9 years while keeping true to the sound that made them a massive part of a lot of younger metal fans lives too."

Simon Crampton of Rock Sins rated the album 8 out of 10 and said: "6 albums into their career and Of Mice & Men have only just begun scratching the surface of what they are capable of. Earthandsky is one of the strongest albums in their entire arsenal and proves that no matter what is thrown at them, they are fully prepared to dust themselves off and keep coming back better than they were before." Wall of Sound gave the album a positive review saying: "Earthandsky is a representation of past and present day Of Mice & Men. The band aims to find the perfect balance in melodic metalcore right throughout this record, layering screams, vocals and breakdowns in a way that makes for an enjoyable listen."

== Track listing ==
All music is composed by Of Mice & Men.

No.	Title	Length
1.	"Gravedancer"	4:32
2.	"As We Suffocate"	3:43
3.	"Taste of Regret"	3:28
4.	"Mushroom Cloud"	4:04
5.	"Pieces"	3:43
6.	"Deceiver/Deceived"	4:09
7.	"Earth & Sky"	4:10
8.	"The Mountain"	4:27
9.	"Meltdown"	3:19
10.	"Linger"	4:08
11.	"How to Survive"	3:56
Total length:		43:40

== Personnel ==
Credits retrieved from AllMusic.

Of Mice & Men

- Aaron Pauley – lead vocals, bass
- Alan Ashby – rhythm guitar, backing vocals
- Phil Manansala – lead guitar, backing vocals
- Valentino Arteaga – drums, percussion

Additional personnel

- Josh Wilbur – engineering, mixing, production
- Nick Rowe – engineering
- Josh Brooks and Lana Migliore – assisting engineering
- Ted Jensen – mastering
- Mike Cortada – artwork, layout

== Charts ==
Chart (2019)	Peak position
Australian Digital Albums (ARIA)	25
German Albums (Offizielle Top 100)	78
Scottish Albums (Official Charts)	68
