= ReverbNation =

Music industry website

- Website type: Music and social networking
- Owner: BandLab Technologies
- Website: reverbnation.com
- Registration: Optional
- Launched: October 31, 2006; 19 years ago
- Current status: active

ReverbNation.com is a website, launched in 2006, that focuses on the independent music industry. It aims to provide a central site for musicians, producers, and venues to collaborate and communicate. ReverbNation was bought for an undisclosed sum by music creation platform, BandLab Technologies, in November 2021.

== Innovations ==
- ReverbNation provides a widget that allows its members to place content on web pages. This TuneWidget is a feature that links back to additional content, such as music recommended by the band who created the widget. In 2007, Webs (formerly Freewebs) added a widget service that included TuneWidget as an option for its web site users.
- A feature called Band Equity measures popularity based on the four metrics of its service: reach, influence, access, and recency with the top 100 music artists of each genre being recognized.

== Events ==
- The band Rehab headlined the ReverbNation summer 2007 tour.
- In May 2008, Judas Priest pre-released a track from its upcoming album on ReverbNation. Its label, Epic Records, described the use of the TuneWidget as "a must have tool for any artist's viral campaign".
- In Dec 2009, ReverbNation partnered with Microsoft launching Playlist 7 sponsorship program where 7 top emerging artists were able to showcase their work having one of their songs featured.
- In Nov 2021, ReverbNation was acquired by BandLab.
