= Defy (album) =

Studio album by Of Mice & Men
- Released: January 19, 2018
- Recorded: 2017
- Studios: West Valley Studios, Woodland Hills, Los Angeles
- Genres: Nu metal; alternative metal; metalcore; heavy metal; hard rock
- Length: 45:31
- Label: Rise
- Producer: Howard Benson

Of Mice & Men chronology
Cold World (2016)	Defy (2018)	Earthandsky (2019)

Singles from Defy
- 1. "Unbreakable" Released: April 24, 2017; 2. "Back to Me" Released: May 22, 2017; 3. "Warzone" Released: November 10, 2017; 4. "Defy" Released: November 27, 2017; 5. "Money" Released: January 12, 2018

Defy is the fifth studio album by American rock band Of Mice & Men. It was released on January 19, 2018, through Rise Records. The album was produced by Howard Benson and is the follow-up to the group's fourth album, Cold World (2016). This is the first album to feature Aaron Pauley as the sole lead vocalist following the departure of Austin Carlile, who left the band in late 2016 due to health issues. It sold 9,400 copies in the US in its first week.

Professional ratings
Review scores
Source	Rating
AllMusic	4/5 stars
Exeposé	4.5/5 stars
Loudwire	(very positive)
Metal Hammer	3.5/5 stars
Renowned for Sound	3.5/5 stars
Rock Sound	8/10 stars

== Track listing ==
All music is composed by Of Mice & Men, except where noted.

Defy track listing
No.	Title	Length
1.	"Defy"	3:41
2.	"Instincts"	4:20
3.	"Back to Me"	3:18
4.	"Sunflower"	3:40
5.	"Unbreakable"	4:09
6.	"Vertigo"	4:14
7.	"Money" (Pink Floyd cover)	3:55
8.	"How Will You Live"	3:41
9.	"On the Inside"	3:14
10.	"Warzone"	3:13
11.	"Forever YDG'N"	3:55
12.	"If We Were Ghosts"	4:12
Total length:		45:31

== Personnel ==
Credits adapted from AllMusic.

Of Mice & Men

- Aaron Pauley – lead vocals, bass
- Alan Ashby – rhythm guitar, backing vocals
- Phil Manansala – lead guitar, backing vocals
- Valentino Arteaga – drums, percussion, backing vocals on "Unbreakable"

Additional personnel

- Howard Benson – production, recording
- Mike Plotnikoff – co-production, engineering
- Hatsukazu Inagaki – engineering
- Zach Darf, Trevor Dietrich and Nik Karpen – assistant engineering
- Chris Lord-Alge – mixing
- Adam Chagnon – additional engineering
- Ted Jensen and Chris Athens – mastering
- Paul DeCarli – editing
- Marc VanGool – guitar technician
- Jon Nicholson – drum technician
- Charles Tsuei – assisting
- Stevie Aiello – composition on "Back to Me" and "How Will You Live"
- Roger Waters – composition on "Money"
- Scott Stephens – composition on "On the Inside"
- Lindsey Byrnes – band photography
- Kevin Moore – art direction, design
- Laurie Belotti – art direction, design assisting

== Charts ==
Chart performance for Defy
Chart (2018)	Peak position
Australian Albums (ARIA)	29
Austrian Albums (Ö3 Austria)	44
Belgian Albums (Ultratop Flanders)	98
Canadian Albums (Billboard)	74
German Albums (Offizielle Top 100)	58
New Zealand Heatseeker Albums (RMNZ)	7
Scottish Albums (Official Charts)	47
Swiss Albums (Schweizer Hitparade)	42
UK Albums (Official Charts)	51
US Billboard 200	48
US Top Hard Rock Albums (Billboard)	3
US Top Rock Albums (Billboard)	7
