= Cold World (Of Mice & Men album) =

Studio album by Of Mice & Men
- Released: September 9, 2016
- Recorded: March–June 2016
- Studios: House of Loud, Elmwood Park, New Jersey
- Genres: Nu metal; metalcore; hard rock; alternative rock
- Length: 43:33
- Label: Rise
- Producer: David Bendeth

Of Mice & Men chronology
Live at Brixton (2016)	Cold World (2016)	Defy (2018)

Singles from Cold World
- 1. "Pain" Released: June 28, 2016; 2. "Real" Released: August 4, 2016; 3. "Contagious" Released: August 30, 2016

Cold World is the fourth studio album by American rock band Of Mice & Men. It was released on September 9, 2016, through Rise Records. The album was produced by David Bendeth and is the follow-up to the group's third studio album, Restoring Force (2014). The lead single, "Pain", was released on June 27, 2016. Another single, "Real", was released on August 4, and then another new song, "Contagious", on August 29. The album was released early exclusively on Apple Music on September 2, 2016. It received mixed reviews from critics. The album reached number 20 in the US, selling 19,000 copies in its first week. This is the last album to feature Austin Carlile as he left the band a few months later due to his health issues.

Professional ratings
Review scores
Source	Rating
AllMusic	2.5/5 stars
Alternative Press	(very positive)
Loudwire	(positive)
Rolling Stone Australia	3/5 stars

== Track listing ==
All tracks written by Austin Carlile, Alan Ashby and Aaron Pauley.

No.	Title	Length
1.	"Game of War"	4:00
2.	"The Lie"	3:24
3.	"Real"	3:12
4.	"Like a Ghost"	4:47
5.	"Contagious"	3:12
6.	"-"	1:10
7.	"Pain"	3:43
8.	"The Hunger"	4:02
9.	"Relentless"	3:26
10.	"Down the Road"	3:22
11.	"+"	1:24
12.	"Away"	3:53
13.	"Transfigured"	3:58
Total length:		43:33

- Some pressings of the album contained a production flaw during the first track "Game of War" where the song would cut to silence for roughly 60 seconds.

== Personnel ==
All credits retrieved from AllMusic.

Of Mice & Men

- Austin Carlile – lead vocals
- Alan Ashby – rhythm guitar, backing vocals
- Phil Manansala – lead guitar, backing vocals on "Relentless"
- Aaron Pauley – bass, clean vocals, string arrangements, programming
- Valentino Arteaga – drums, percussion, programming

Additional musicians

- Cassy Colunga – hand claps on "The Lie"

Additional personnel

- David Bendeth – arranging, mixing, production
- Ted Jensen – mastering
- Jake "Scooby" Mannix – assistant
- Mitch Milan – editing, engineering, guitar technician
- Koby Nelson – editing, engineering, programming
- Brian Robbins – digital editing, engineering, mixing engineering, programming

== Charts ==
Chart (2016)	Peak position
Australian Albums (ARIA)	27
Belgian Albums (Ultratop Flanders)	155
Belgian Albums (Ultratop Wallonia)	135
Canadian Albums (Billboard)	71
New Zealand Heatseekers Albums (RMNZ)	3
Scottish Albums (Official Charts)	76
UK Albums (Official Charts)	91
UK Rock & Metal Albums (Official Charts)	6
US Billboard 200	20
US Top Rock Albums (Billboard)	6
