= Tether (album) =

Studio album by Of Mice & Men
- Released: October 6, 2023
- Recorded: 2022–2023
- Genre: Metalcore
- Length: 37:53
- Label: SharpTone
- Producers: Of Mice & Men

Of Mice & Men chronology
Echo (2021)	Tether (2023)	Another Miracle (2025)

Singles from Tether
- 1. "Warpaint" Released: July 28, 2023; 2. "Castaway" Released: August 23, 2023; 3. "Indigo" Released: September 20, 2023

Tether is the eighth studio album by American rock band Of Mice & Men. The album was released on October 6, 2023, through SharpTone Records and was self-produced by the band. This is the last album the band released on SharpTone Records.

== Background and promotion ==
On February 12, 2023, Of Mice & Men announced through social media that they have nearly wrapped up the material for their eighth studio album. On July 9, the band shared a video online, features behind the scenes footage from a recent video shoot, including a photo shoot. On July 17, they revealed the title to their eighth studio album. On the same day, the band confirmed that the first single titled "Warpaint" would be released on July 28. On July 28, the band revealed the album's release date.

On August 23, the band released the second single "Castaway" along with an accompanying music video. On September 20, three weeks before the album release, the band released the third single "Indigo". The music video for "Into the Sun" was released October 6, 2023, coinciding with the album release.

== Critical reception ==
Professional ratings
Review scores
Source	Rating
Blabbermouth.net	8/10
Distorted Sound	8/10
HM	4/5 stars
Kerrang!	2/5 stars
Metal Hammer	4/5 stars
Outburn	9/10
Rock 'N' Load	9/10
Rock Sins	8/10

The album received generally positive reviews from critics. Anne Erickson from Blabbermouth.net gave the album 8 out of 10 and said: "Of Mice & Men continue to grow and change as a band, and Tether is a solid piece of their story. While those who prefer more brutal sounding metalcore might be left a bit cold, others who enjoy the genre's massive hooks and melodies will likely be cranking this record for years to come. Even on record eight, Of Mice & Men are staying limber enough to evolve and push the envelope, creatively." Ed Walton of Distorted Sound scored the album 8 out of 10 and said: "Tether shows that Of Mice & Men are at the absolute top of their game; it's obvious that each member didn't let a single second go to waste during the recording process and left it all in the studio. Everything about the record is done to almost perfection, although one criticism is that every now and then, particularly on the heavier sounding songs, the vocals sometimes feel like they can get lost amongst the cacophony of sound. Overall though, the album is a welcome return from the metalcore troupe; there is plenty to enjoy for old fans and it will also work as the perfect gateway for new fans they pick up along the way. By the end of it, you'll have your own warpaint ready, hanging on and very likely screaming along to every word." Tom Lamm of HM stated "Above all, the journey the band orchestrates from start to finish in their latest release reflects their care and intentionality with music, something no OM&M fan will be surprised to hear. Fitting for its name, Tether will undoubtedly stick with you as a hard-hitting and a triumphant return for the rock giants we know and love."

In a more mixed review, Kerrang! gave the album 2 out of 5 and stated: "Live, these songs will probably find the required juice to make them stand as tall as they might. As it is, Tether all too often comes across as vague, distant, and in need of a spark to set the whole thing off." Metal Hammer gave the album a positive review and stated: "Tether is a reminder that Of Mice & Men are as deliberate in their choice of track order and album cohesion as they are in their songwriting, and it makes for a powerfully immersive journey." Outburn gave the album 9 out of 10 and stated: "Tether is not just the band's next step, but an album that showcases seasoned veterans who are technical juggernauts at what they continue to give musically." Rock 'N' Load praised the album saying, "Having always managed to have a great mix between the brutal and melodic side of the genre, not much has changed here although the melodic side seems to shine through more on this one than previous releases." Simon Crampton of Rock Sins rated the album 8 out of 10 and said: "Tether is another string on an already impressively stacked bow and one that showcases what a great band Of Mice & Men have grown into."

== Track listing ==
All tracks are written by Of Mice & Men (Valentino Arteaga, Alan Ashby, Phil Manansala, Aaron Pauley).

Tether track listing
No.	Title	Length
1.	"Integration"	4:02
2.	"Warpaint"	3:28
3.	"Shiver"	4:08
4.	"Eternal Pessimist"	3:53
5.	"Into the Sun"	3:34
6.	"Enraptured"	4:03
7.	"Castaway"	3:31
8.	"Tether"	3:55
9.	"Indigo"	3:41
10.	"Zephyros"	3:38
Total length:		37:53

== Personnel ==
Of Mice & Men

- Aaron Pauley – lead vocals, bass, production, engineering, mixing, mastering
- Alan Ashby – rhythm guitar, backing vocals, production, engineering
- Phil Manansala – lead guitar, backing vocals, production, engineering
- Valentino Arteaga – drums, percussion, production, engineering, artwork, layout

== Charts ==
Chart performance for Tether
Chart (2023)	Peak position
UK Album Downloads (Official Charts)	72
UK Rock & Metal Albums (Official Charts)	30
