= Another Miracle =

Studio album by Of Mice & Men
- Released: November 14, 2025
- Genres: Metalcore; hard rock
- Length: 43:56
- Label: Century Media
- Producers: Of Mice & Men

Of Mice & Men chronology
Tether (2023)	Another Miracle (2025)

Singles from Another Miracle
- 1. "Another Miracle" Released: May 8, 2025; 2. "Wake Up" Released: July 11, 2025; 3. "Troubled Water" Released: September 19, 2025; 4. "Flowers" Released: November 10, 2025

Professional ratings
Review scores
Source	Rating
Kerrang!	3/5

Another Miracle is the ninth studio album by American rock band Of Mice & Men. The album was released on November 14, 2025, their first one with Century Media Records.

== Background and promotion ==
On May 8, 2025, the band released the single, "Another Miracle", as well as their signing to Century Media Records. On July 10, they revealed the title and release date of their ninth studio album. On the same day, the band released the second single titled "Wake Up".

On September 18, the band released the third single "Troubled Water" along with an accompanying music video. On November 10, four days before the album release, the band released the fourth single "Flowers".

The band embarked on a European tour between November and December 2025. They also embarked on a five-date Australian tour in May 2026 with Crystal Lake. Kerrang! has put together a limited-edition bundle that includes Another Miracle "on special-edition marble blue/lilac vinyl, but the record also comes with an exclusive VIP commemorative laminate and a 20-page printed zine featuring a brand-new interview and photoshoot."

== Track listing ==
All tracks are written by Of Mice & Men.

Another Miracle track listing
No.	Title	Length
1.	"A Waltz"	3:43
2.	"Troubled Water"	3:43
3.	"Safe and Sound"	4:02
4.	"Hourglass"	3:11
5.	"Wake Up"	3:32
6.	"Flowers"	4:09
7.	"Another Miracle"	3:10
8.	"Contact"	3:17
9.	"Parable"	3:17
10.	"Somewhere in Between"	4:04
11.	"Swallow"	3:15
12.	"Infinite"	4:38
Total length:		43:56

== Personnel ==
Credits adapted from the album's liner notes and Bandcamp.

=== Of Mice & Men ===
- Aaron Pauley – vocals, bass, production, mixing, mastering
- Alan Ashby – guitar, backing vocals, production, recording
- Phil Manansala – guitar, backing vocals, production, recording
- Valentino Arteaga – drums, percussion, production, recording

=== Additional contributor ===
- Matthias Löwenstein – artwork

== Charts ==
Chart performance for Another Miracle
Chart (2025)	Peak position
French Rock & Metal Albums (SNEP)	90
UK Album Downloads (Official Charts)	63
