= Of Mice & Men (album) =

Studio album by Of Mice & Men
- Released: March 9, 2010
- Studios: The Foundation Recording Studios, Connersville, Indiana
- Genres: Metalcore; post-hardcore
- Length: 33:41
- Label: Rise
- Producer: Joey Sturgis

Of Mice & Men chronology
| Of Mice & Men (2010) | The Flood (2011) |

Singles from Of Mice & Men
- 1. "Seven Thousand Miles for What" Released: June 1, 2009; 2. "Second & Sebring" Released: August 7, 2010; 3. "Those in Glass Houses" Released: August 7, 2010

Of Mice & Men is the debut studio album by American rock band Of Mice & Men. It was originally planned to be released on February 23, 2010, but was delayed until March 9. The album was released through Rise Records and was produced by Joey Sturgis. This is the only album to feature bassist and backing vocalist Jaxin Hall.

== Background ==
Of Mice & Men began progress on their self-titled debut shortly after demo session recordings. The group was signed to Rise within lead vocalist Austin Carlile's acknowledgment that the previous group he was a part of, Attack Attack!, were signed to label upon his membership. The album was officially announced by Austin Carlile on the band's YouTube channel on December 23, 2009, and is currently available on SmartPunk, MerchNOW, and InterPunk. Shortly after the album's release Carlile left the band and Jerry Roush took his position on unclean vocals. After Warped Tour 2010, Jaxin Hall left the band to improve his home life and work on his clothing company, Love Before Glory. Jerry was with Of Mice & Men up to the This Is a Family Tour with label mates Attack Attack!. After this, Carlile was invited and returned to the band again with Roush fired. Austin Carlile was working on a side project with Alan Ashby at the time, so when he was invited back, he said that he and Alan were a package deal. Alan was put on rhythm guitar and Shayley Bourget was moved to bass, but he was still doing clean vocals. Music videos were made for the songs "Those in Glass Houses" and "Second & Sebring".

Professional ratings
Review scores
| Source | Rating |
|---|---|
| AbsolutePunk | 67% |
| Review Rinse Repeat | 2.5/5 stars |

== Track listing ==
All lyrics written by Austin Carlile, Jaxin Hall, and Shayley Bourget; all music composed by Of Mice & Men.

| No. | Title | Length |
|---|---|---|
| 1. | "YDG" | 3:18 |
| 2. | "They Don't Call It the South for Nothing" | 3:07 |
| 3. | "Second & Sebring" | 3:49 |
| 4. | "Westbound & Down" | 3:39 |
| 5. | "John Deux Trois" | 3:17 |
| 6. | "Those in Glass Houses" | 2:42 |
| 7. | "Farewell to Shady Glade" | 3:41 |
| 8. | "The Ballad of Tommy Clayton & the Rawdawg Millionaire" | 3:50 |
| 9. | "Seven Thousand Miles for What" | 2:53 |
| 10. | "This One's for You" | 3:27 |
| Total length: | | 33:41 |

== Personnel ==
=== Of Mice & Men ===
- Austin Carlile – unclean vocals
- Phil Manansala – lead guitar
- Shayley Bourget – clean vocals, rhythm guitar, piano on "Second & Sebring"
- Jaxin Hall – bass, backing vocals
- Valentino Arteaga – drums, percussion

=== Additional personnel ===
- Joey Sturgis – production, engineering, mixing, mastering

== Charts ==
| Chart | Peak position |
|---|---|
| Billboard 200 | 115 |
| U.S. Billboard Independent Albums | 12 |
| U.S. Billboard Heatseekers Albums | 3 |
| U.S. Billboard Rock Albums | 35 |
| U.S. Billboard Hard Rock Albums | 10 |
