= The Flood (Of Mice & Men album) =

Studio album by Of Mice & Men
- Released: June 14, 2011
- Studios: The Foundation Recording Studios, Connersville, Indiana
- Genres: Metalcore; post-hardcore
- Length: 39:24
- Label: Rise
- Producer: Joey Sturgis

Of Mice & Men chronology
Of Mice & Men (2010)	The Flood (2011)	Restoring Force (2014)

Singles from The Flood
- 1. "Still YDG'N" Released: May 13, 2011; 2. "Purified" Released: May 24, 2011; 3. "The Depths" Released: June 14, 2012

Deluxe reissue album cover
- Artwork used for the deluxe reissue album cover.

The Flood is the second studio album by American rock band Of Mice & Men. It was released on June 14, 2011, through Rise Records and was produced by Joey Sturgis. On May 13, 2011, they released the song "Still YDG'N". The album was leaked onto the internet on June 10, 2011, with Rise Records countering the leak by uploading the album on to their YouTube page four days before the release. The album debuted at number 28 on the Billboard 200, selling over 13,000 copies in its first week, making it one of Rise Records' best-selling releases at the time. It is also the first album to feature rhythm guitarist Alan Ashby, as well as the last release to feature bassist and clean vocalist Shayley Bourget. It marks a considerably heavier, technical musical approach from the band, and a stronger use of clean vocals from Bourget, having him lead three songs on the album ("My Understandings", "Purified" and "When You Can't Sleep at Night").

The album was re-released on July 24, 2012, and was produced by Cameron Webb. The re-release has four new songs, all written and performed without Bourget, new artwork, and the acoustic bonus track "When You Can't Sleep at Night".

== Critical reception ==
Professional ratings
Aggregate scores
Source	Rating
Metacritic	70/100
Review scores
Source	Rating
AllMusic	3.5/5 stars
Alternative Press	3.5/5 stars
Kerrang!	3/5 stars
Rock Sound	8/10
Sputnikmusic	4/5

The Flood has been well received by critics. On Metacritic, which assigns a normalized rating out of 100, the album currently holds a 70, based on five reviews, indicating generally positive reviews. The album received 8/10 on Rock Sound, which described the album "A truly memorable, hip-shaking face-breaker of epic proportions." At Alternative Press, Phil Freeman rated the album three-and-a-half stars, and called the album "a genuine statement of artistic purpose."

James Shotwell of underthegunreview.net awarded the album an 8.5/10, saying, "While it has its moments of doubt, there is no denying the amount of hard work, passion, and emotion poured into every second of this record." The album also earned a score of 4/5 stars on Propertyofzack.com.

== Commercial performance ==
During its first week of sale, the album sold 15,000 copies in the United States. As of January 2014, the album had sold 139,000 copies in the United States.

== Track listing ==
No.	Title	Length
1.	"O.G. Loko"	3:18
2.	"Ben Threw"	3:11
3.	"Let Live"	4:16
4.	"Still YDG'N"	3:11
5.	"My Understandings"	2:33
6.	"Ohioisonfire"	3:08
7.	"Purified"	3:35
8.	"Product of a Murderer"	3:51
9.	"Repeating Apologies"	3:43
10.	"The Great Hendowski"	3:06
11.	"I'm a Monster"	1:59
Total length:		35:52

CD bonus track
No.	Title	Length
12.	"When You Can't Sleep at Night"	3:32
Total length:		39:24

Bonus CD on 2012 deluxe reissue
No.	Title	Length
1.	"The Calm"	1:50
2.	"The Storm"	4:05
3.	"The Flood"	3:10
4.	"The Depths"	3:46
Total length:		52:21

== Personnel ==
Of Mice & Men

- Austin Carlile – unclean vocals, additional clean vocals on "Ben Threw", "My Understandings" and "The Flood"
- Shayley Bourget – clean vocals, bass, acoustic guitar on "When You Can't Sleep at Night", additional guitars on "My Understandings"
- Phil Manansala – lead guitar
- Alan Ashby – rhythm guitar, bass on "The Calm", "The Storm", "The Flood" and "The Depths"
- Valentino Arteaga – drums, percussion

Additional personnel

- Joey Sturgis – production, engineering, mixing, mastering
- Toby Fraser – art direction, design

Additional personnel (deluxe reissue)

- Cameron Webb – production
- Joey Sturgis – mixing, mastering

== Charts ==
Chart performance for The Flood
Chart (2011)	Peak position
US Billboard 200	28
US Top Hard Rock Albums (Billboard)	3
US Independent Albums (Billboard)	5
US Top Rock Albums (Billboard)	6
