= Aaron Pauley =

American singer

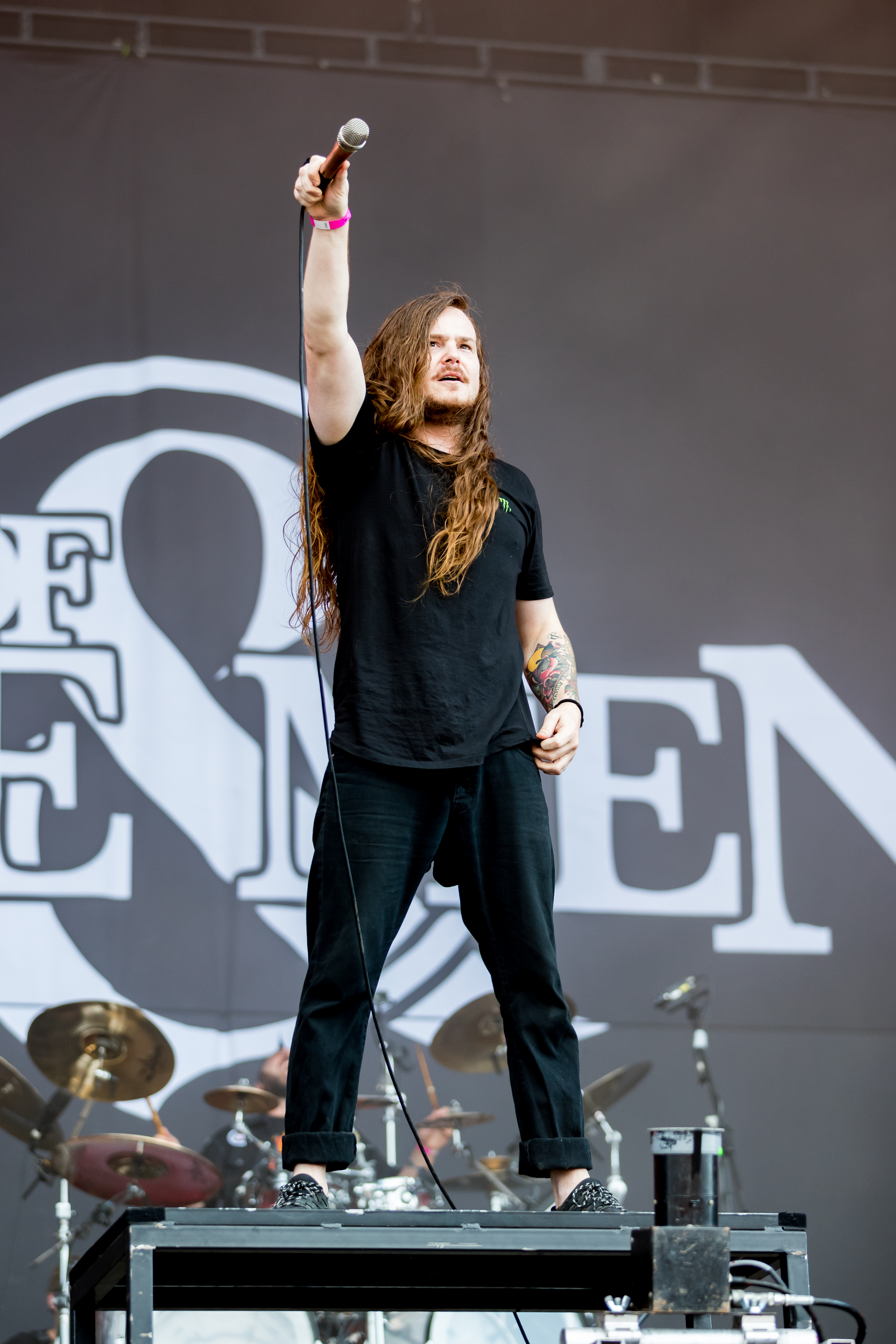
- Aaron Pauley performing in 2019

Background information
- Born: Aaron Charles Pauley; August 4, 1988 (age 38); Vacaville, California, U.S.
- Genres: Metalcore; post-hardcore; nu metal; alternative metal; hard rock; electronicore (early)
- Occupations: Singer; musician; songwriter
- Instruments: Vocals; bass
- Years active: 2004–present
- Member of: Jamie's Elsewhere; Of Mice & Men
- Formerly of: Razing Alexandria

Aaron Charles Pauley (born August 4, 1988) is an American musician, best known as the lead vocalist and bassist for the rock band Of Mice & Men and the lead vocalist for Jamie's Elsewhere. He was also formerly the lead vocalist for Razing Alexandria, as well as independently producing tracks for the YouTube tech channel GamersNexus for their series documenting corruption and collusion within the computer hardware industry

== Biography ==
Pauley grew up in Vacaville together with his parents Randy and Kellie Pauley, and younger brother, Samuel. He developed an interest in music at an early age and began playing guitar at the age of eight, and began playing bass at age 11. Pauley joined his first band, Menace to Society, at the age of 13. He graduated from Vacaville High School in 2006. Two years later, he joined the Sacramento-based Jamie's Elsewhere as a vocalist and recorded two albums with them. He joined Of Mice & Men in 2012.

Pauley currently lives in Huntington Beach, California with his wife Amanda Bouffard and his Boston Terrier, Daisy.

== Discography ==
All credits were taken from Pauley's AllMusic credits list.

With Jamie's Elsewhere

- They Said a Storm Was Coming (2010)
- Reimagined (EP, 2012)
- Paradise (EP, 2023)
- Alchemical (EP, 2025)

With Of Mice & Men

- Restoring Force (2014)
- Cold World (2016)
- Defy (2018)
- Earthandsky (2019)
- Echo (2021)
- Tether (2023)
- Another Miracle (2025)

==== Independent ====
- CYBERDYSTOPIA (2026)

=== Collaborations and other songs ===
Song	Year	Artist	Release
"You Had Me at Hello" (featuring Aaron Pauley)	2010	The Parade	Castles
"Nicotine Battle vs. Theropy" (featuring Aaron Pauley)	2010	Twenty Days with Julian	Twenty Days with Julian
"Battle for Athens" (featuring Aaron Pauley)	2011	The Light Iris	Cities Built on Ruins of Regret
"(A) 1.13.40" (featuring Aaron Pauley)	2011	The Blush of Dawn	The Blush of Dawn
"Straighten Up" (featuring Aaron Pauley)	2012	Eric July	Non-album single
"Meet You in the Sound" (featuring Aaron Pauley)	2022	Kayzo & PhaseOne	New Breed
"Sacred Kiss" (featuring Aaron Pauley)	2022	Bad Wolves	Sacred Kiss
"One Foot in the Grave" (featuring Aaron Pauley)	2024	From Ashes to New	Blackout
