= Austin Carlile =

American singer (born 1987)

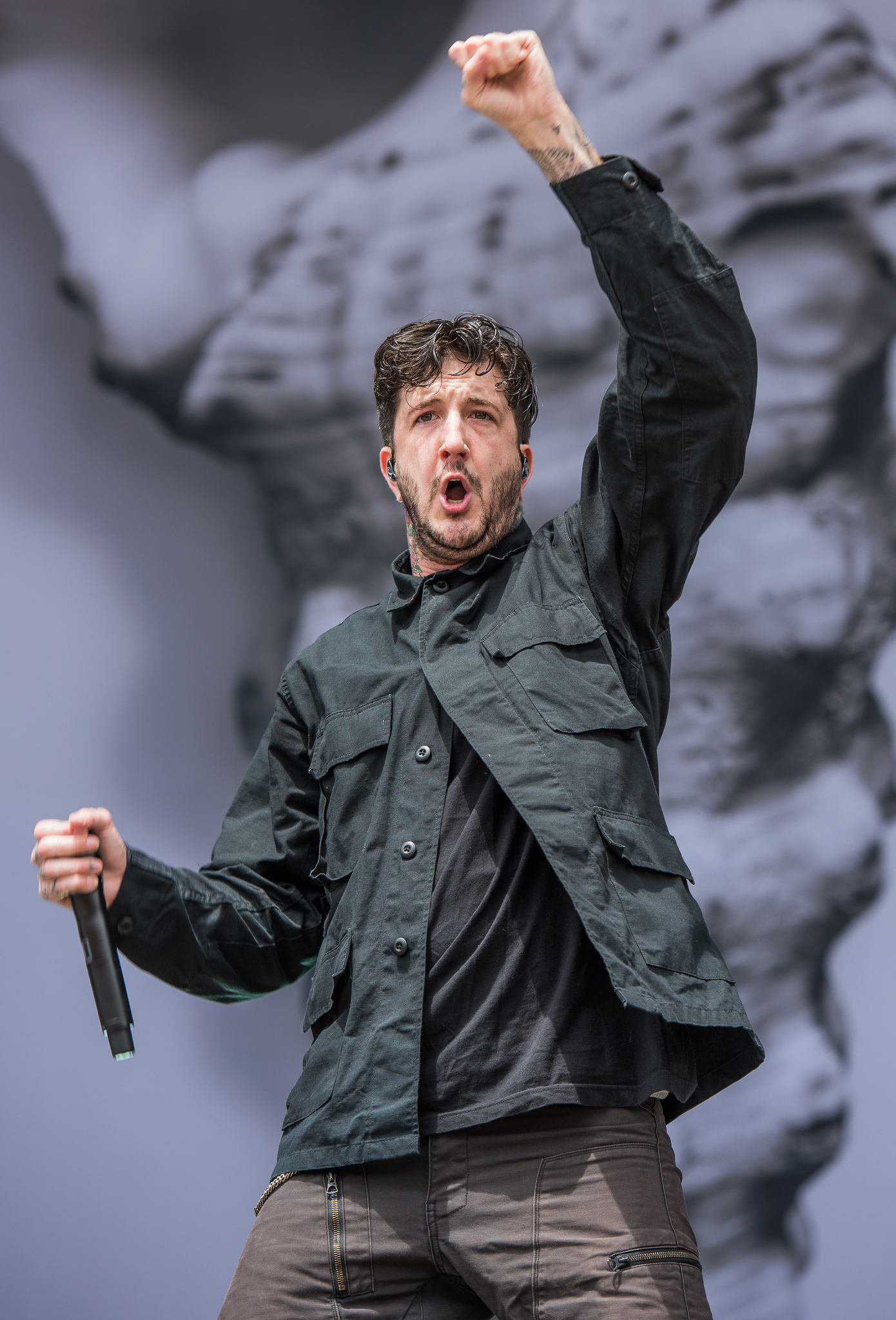
- Carlile performing with Of Mice & Men in 2016

Background information
- Born: Austin Robert Carlile; September 27, 1987 (age 38); Pensacola, Florida, U.S.
- Origin: Columbus, Ohio, U.S.
- Genres: Metalcore; nu metal; post-hardcore; electronicore
- Occupation: Singer
- Years active: 2006–2016 2025-present
- Formerly of: Call It Even; Attack Attack!; Of Mice & Men

Austin Robert Carlile (born September 27, 1987) is an American singer who achieved prominence as the former lead vocalist of Attack Attack! and Of Mice & Men. After leaving Of Mice & Men, he began coaching youth baseball in Costa Rica. A high school athlete, multiple surgeries from Marfan syndrome during his teenage years turned him towards music. In December 2016, Carlile departed from Of Mice & Men due to his Marfan syndrome and the effects that his vocal performances were having on his body. In 2026, Carlile returned to music as a solo artist, releasing several independent singles.

== Career ==
=== Attack Attack! (2006–2008) ===
Carlile formed Attack Attack! (originally called Ambiance) around 2006 when Johnny Franck, Andrew Whiting, Nick White, and Andrew Wetzel met Carlile while playing in local high school bands. In 2008, halfway through a tour supporting Maylene and the Sons of Disaster, Confide, A Static Lullaby, and Showbread, Carlile was replaced by Nick Barham, brother of former Sleeping with Sirens drummer Gabe Barham. Carlile said it was for "personal reasons" that he left the band.

=== Of Mice & Men (2009–2010, 2011–2016) ===
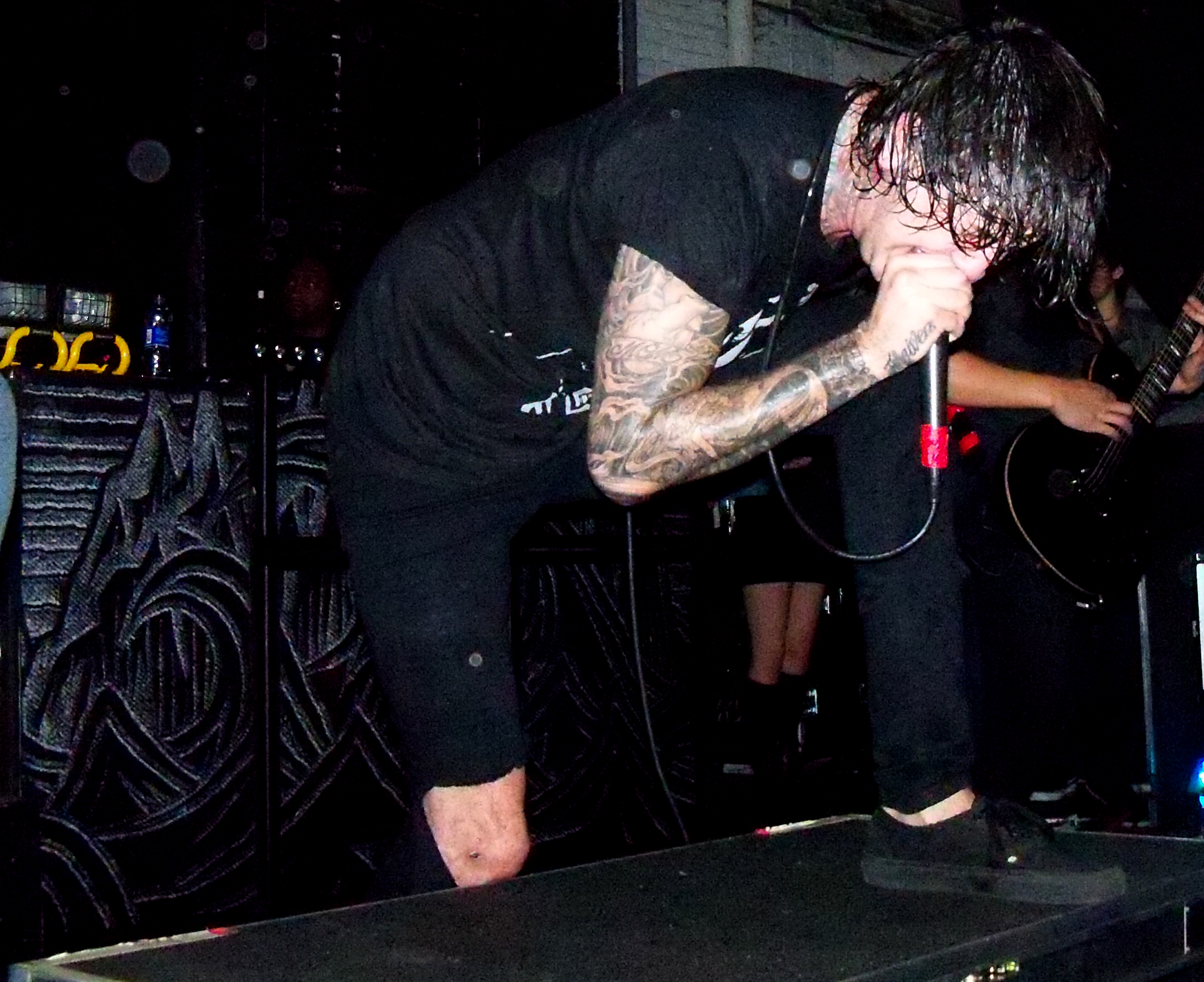
Carlile performing with Of Mice & Men in 2011

On October 8, 2009, the same day Carlile announced that he was no longer a part of Attack Attack!, he officially announced the formation of his new project, Of Mice & Men, with Jaxin Hall (bassist). Their first release was "Seven Thousand Miles for What?". They also did a cover of Lady Gaga's "Poker Face", then soon after released "No Really, It's Fine". Soon after, Austin and Jaxin started to gather up the other members of the band. The band recruited several members of already-existing bands, such as Phil Manansala (lead guitarist) from A Static Lullaby, and Valentino Arteaga (drummer) from Lower Definition. Their self-titled debut album was officially announced to be released on February 23, 2010, but was delayed until March 9 for finishes on production. In 2010, Austin was unable to tour with Of Mice & Men, because he needed to have major heart surgery, and his health prevented him from touring. Jerry Roush from Sky Eats Airplane served as the tour replacement for Austin. Roush then became a permanent substitute, even after Carlile was able to tour again. In September 2010, shortly after the departure of Craig Owens of Chiodos, rumors that Carlile would replace him circulated quickly, but were denied when Brandon Bolmer was announced as vocalist. A fake tweet from Carlile's account was produced making it seem that Carlile would be joining Chiodos as vocalist. Carlile re-joined the band on January 3, 2011.

In the early morning of March 30, 2013, Carlile was arrested in Bowling Green, Ohio with drum technician Lionel Robinson II, he was later charged with felonious assault. The band missed two shows on the "Right Back at It Again" tour with A Day to Remember and Chunk! No, Captain Chunk! as a result. Carlile's mugshot was released two days later. Carlile was released on bail and ordered not to have any contact with the victim. On April 29, 2013, Carlile's original charge of felonious assault was reduced to misdemeanor assault by the judge, and he was subsequently found guilty. He was fined $1,000 plus court expenses, although $800 of the fine was suspended.

In October 2016, the band pulled out in the midst of a European tour so that Carlile could seek medical treatment after experiencing pain during a show in Portsmouth. In late November, Carlile elaborated in a series of tweets that, as someone with Marfan syndrome, he wouldn't "get better" and that he had undergone multiple surgeries "just so I can function/live."

On December 30, 2016, Austin Carlile posted on his Instagram and Twitter an open letter stating that he was leaving Of Mice & Men to focus on healing, moving on, and getting better after settling in Costa Rica, saying "...with the closing of one door, another will open." He also said that he "will not stop playing music" and that he is "still able to sing and I'm hungry for what is next to come even though I have no idea what that may be."

It was revealed on February 17, 2017 that one of the other reasons that, aside from struggling with Marfan Syndrome, Carlile had left Of Mice & Men was because they did not allow him to write what he wanted on Cold World, the band's next album following Restoring Force.

=== Solo career (2026–present) ===
In February 2026, Carlile was announced as a performer for that year's Louder Than Life festival in September, listed as "the original voice of Of Mice & Men".

== Personal life ==
On May 13, 2005, Carlile's mother died at the age of 38 due to an aneurysm. She also had undiagnosed Marfan syndrome, a disease Carlile would genetically inherit. Although raised Catholic, Carlile became disillusioned with the religion for a while in the wake of his mother's sudden death. However, on July 3, 2016, Carlile was baptized and has identified as a Christian ever since. Allegedly, since his time in Costa Rica, some visiting ministers prayed for him and the symptoms of his condition subsided where he could again live an active and healthy lifestyle.

=== Sexual assault allegations ===
I did things and acted in ways that I am not proud of, but never have I violated anyone. These 'accusations' being thrown around on social media, in our current 'cancel culture' climate, are extremely heinous and completely without merit.

— Austin Carlile in June 2020 regarding the alleged abuse incidents

Carlile was accused of the alleged sexual assault of multiple women from recent cases that are alleged to have occurred over several years. The cases had been submitted to the American music magazine Alternative Press. The magazine interviewed more than 10 suspected victims after multiple women made allegations against Carlile. The magazine constructed an investigative article on the cases to which they ultimately decided to not publish, which resulted in controversy. They explained on social media "For legal purposes regarding the Austin Carlile accusations, the story couldn't run as it was told. [...] We do not condone any of the accusations & this story WILL be heard."

On June 10, 2020, Alternative Press founder Mike Shea posted a statement explaining that the Carlile investigation was not published due to their staff's inability to verify the claims "through official legal documentation", along with a lack of communication from accusers and other sources. On June 18, Carlile denied the accusations made against him in a statement.

== Discography ==
=== As lead singer ===
With Call It Even

- Over and Done (EP) (self-released, 2006)

With Attack Attack!

- If Guns Are Outlawed, Can We Use Swords? (EP) (self-released, 2008)
- Someday Came Suddenly (Rise, 2008)

With Of Mice & Men

- Of Mice & Men (Rise, 2010)
- The Flood (Rise, 2011)
- Restoring Force (Rise, 2014)
- Cold World (Rise, 2016)

Solo

- 2Die4 (2026)

=== As featured artist ===
- 2008 – "Time Won't Wait" (Fantastic!) on the album Go Whatever
- 2009 – "Have You Ever Danced?" (Breathe Carolina) on the Deluxe Edition of the album Hello Fascination
- 2009 – "Truth Be Told" (Her Demise, My Rise) on the album The Takeover
- 2009 – "It's a Long Drive Home from Texas" (We Are Defiance)
- 2009 – "Fighting Is for Dead Men" (Though She Wrote) on the album The Invitation
- 2011 – "The New York Chainsaw Massacre" (That's Outrageous!) on the album Teenage Scream

=== Music Videos ===
Song	Year	Director
"Twisted"	2026	Zack Perez
"Reflection"	2026	Zack Perez
"So Happy"	2026	Zack Perez
