= Seven Year Itch: 1982–1989 =

Compilation album by Platinum Blonde
- Released: September 1999
- Genre: Pop rock
- Length: 59:50
- Label: Sony BMG

Platinum Blonde chronology
Best of Live (1993)	Seven Year Itch: 1982–1989 (1999)	Now & Never (2012)

Seven Year Itch: 1982–1989 is a compilation album of songs by Platinum Blonde. The 1999 album was released on record label Sony Music Direct as a compact disc and cassette. Music critic Mike DeGagne, of Allmusic, calls the release "...a worthy summation of [Platinum Blonde's] five year existence."

When released, the album was the only available release on CD of material from Platinum Blonde's first two albums (Standing in the Dark and Alien Shores).

== Track listing ==
1. "It Doesn't Really Matter"
2. "Holy Water"
3. "Automatic Drive"
4. "Animal"
5. "Not in Love"
6. "Sad Sad Rain"
7. "Crying Over You"
8. "Contact"
9. "Chaperone Sally"
10. "Somebody, Somewhere"
11. "All Fall Down"
12. "Lost In Space"
13. "Situation Critical"
14. "Standing In the Dark"
15. "Hungry Eyes"
16. "Cinderella Story"
