= David Bendeth =

English record producer (born 1954)

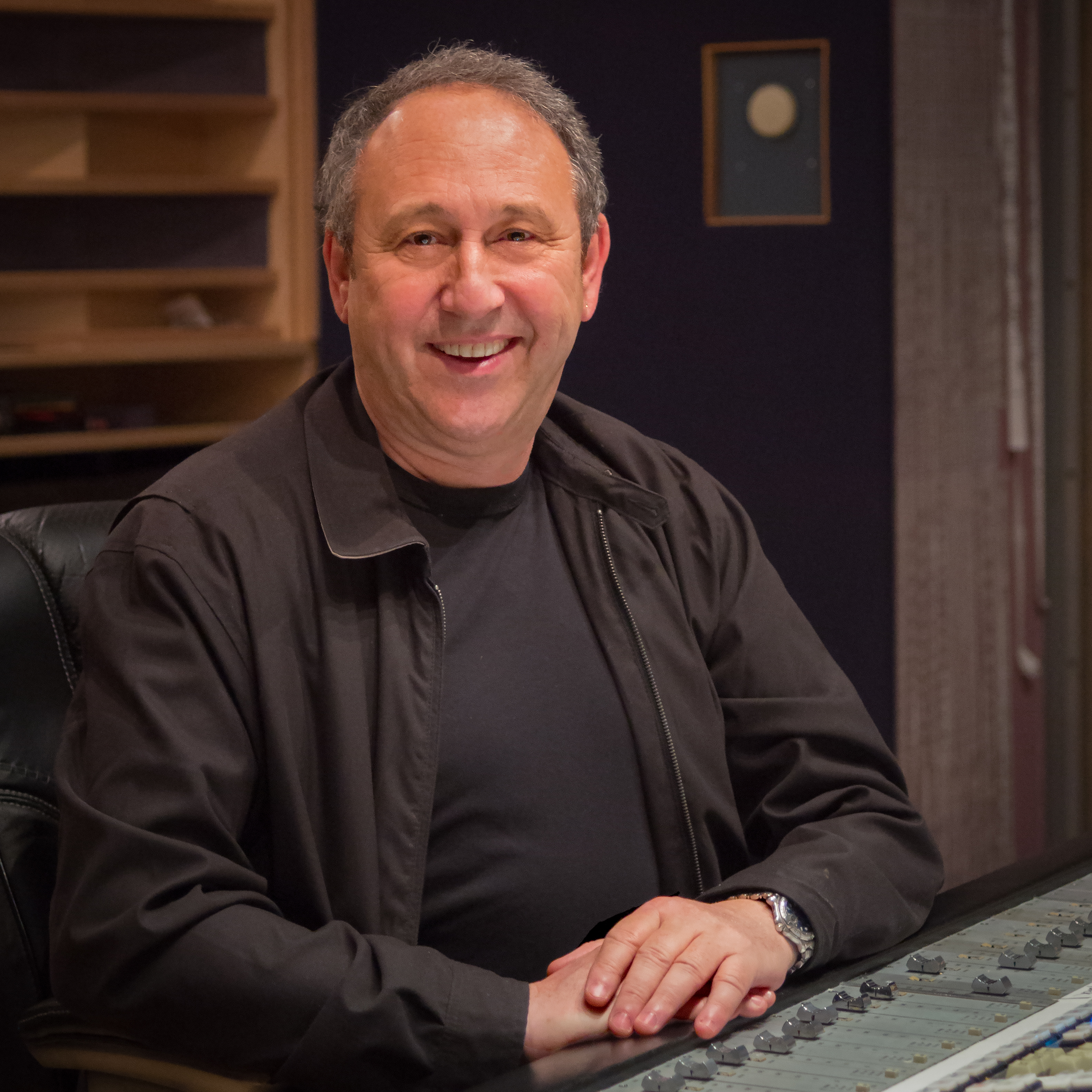
- Bendeth in 2015

Background information
- Born: David Jonathan Bendeth; 17 June 1954 (age 72); Stoke Newington, Hackney, London, England
- Genres: Jazz fusion; soul; funk; rock; hard rock; heavy metal
- Occupations: Record producer; songwriter; musician; mixer
- Instruments: Guitar; keyboards
- Years active: 1977–present
- Labels: Sony Canada; EMI; Ensign
- Website: davidbendeth.com

David Jonathan Bendeth (born 17 June 1954) is an English multi-platinum award-winning record producer. He was also the frontman of The Bendeth Band.

== Early life ==
David Bendeth was born on 17 June 1954 in Stoke Newington, Hackney, London, England. He attended Parkhill School in Ilford, London and in 1963, his family moved to Toronto, Ontario, Canada. Bendeth attended Georges Vanier Secondary School. Following graduation in 1973, Bendeth was to attend university, however he left for a summer vacation to London and stayed there. His first job in London was at Harlequin Records and he eventually joined the house band playing guitar at Speakeasy, a London club, along with Joe Jammer. In 1976, he returned to Canada. He was playing with the band Boule Noire at Riviera 76, a day music festival in Nice, and there he met Jeff Berlin, Lenny White, Joe Beck, and many other jazz musicians. Bendeth also played on Quebec band Toulouse's album with Muscle Shoals Rhythm Section and singer Leroy Sibbles from the Heptones.

== Career ==
In 1977, Bendeth moved back to Toronto. He put together The David Bendeth Band and was signed by Interglobal Music, which was distributed by Epic Records. Their producer was Alan Caddy. Lenny White, Marcus Miller, and Billy Cobham all played on the album. This was originally meant to be fully instrumental, however Bendeth decided to have some of his friends sing on one of the songs, "Feel the Real" and it became the #1 Dance Single in the UK. Bendeth had a No. 44 hit with "Feel The Real" in 1979 in the UK Singles Chart, In the same year he released an album, Adrenalin.

Roger Ames then signed him through EMI Records UK to a label called Sidewalk Records and The David Bendeth Band started touring with bands like The Pointer Sisters, Gary US Bonds, and The Police. All together, Bendeth put out three records and 15 singles before he decided he'd had enough and took a job as a staff producer/A&R person with CBS Records, first in Toronto, Canada, then in New York City where he worked in the international division. During this time, Bendeth produced and mixed two records with Platinum Blonde one of them being Contact. Bendeth left CBS Records. He was a songwriter for Chrysalis Records from 1987–1990. While in England putting a band together with Simon Climie and Rob Fisher, Bendeth and Climie wrote a song called "Ecstasy", which became the B side of Jeff Beck's single, "People Get Ready", off Beck's album Flash. In 1987, Bendeth wrote "Two Wrongs (Don't Make a Right)" for the Joe Cocker album, Unchain My Heart, with Eddie Shwartz which became a #1 single on the US and worldwide radio charts.

From 1987 to 1995, Bendeth was the Staff Producer and head of the A&R department for BMG Canada. During this time, he signed the Cowboy Junkies, Crash Test Dummies, Sven Gali, Big House, Charlie Major, and Prairie Oyster. From 1995 to 2002, he was the SR. VP of the A&R department of RCA Records in New York. While there, he signed Vertical Horizon and SR 71, and produced Vertical Horizon's single "You're a God", Bruce Hornsby's album Big Swing Face, and SR71's single "Right Now". He also produced and mixed Elvis Presley's ELV1S: 30#1 Hits. By 2003, the album had received certifications in more than fifteen regions and had sold over ten million copies worldwide.-

Bendeth won the Socan Pop songwriting award in Canada on 21 November 2011 for co-writing the Hedley song "Perfect". The song garnered the most airplay for the previous year in the category rock/pop.

In 2023, Bendeth appeared as a guest instructor on the Nail the Mix music-production platform, where he provided a full breakdown of his mix for Underoath’s song "Writing on the Walls" from their album Define the Great Line.

Bendeth has also collaborated with several audio-software companies on signature production tools. He partnered with Boz Digital Labs to develop the "David Bendeth Signature Series", a suite of virtual instruments and effects based on his recording and mixing workflow. Boz Digital Labs later released updated version 2.0 editions of Bendeth’s 10dB plugin series. His signature compressor plugin was also highlighted in industry coverage by Mixonline.

In addition to his work with Boz Digital Labs, Bendeth released a drum-sample library titled "Drumshotz: David Bendeth" through Drumforge. He also collaborated with MBSoft-Lab on the MBDBVerb reverb plugin.

He has either produced or mixed albums by Paramore, Breaking Benjamin, Elvis Presley, Papa Roach, Killswitch Engage, In Flames, The Red Jumpsuit Apparatus, Hawthorne Heights, Underoath, A Day To Remember, Taking Back Sunday, Chiodos, The Almost, Vertical Horizon, SR-71, As I Lay Dying, All Time Low, Bruce Hornsby, Hedley, Kaiser Chiefs, Bring Me the Horizon, Of Mice & Men, Asking Alexandria, We Came as Romans, Coldrain, Tonight Alive, Beartooth, Young Guns, I Prevail, Sleeping with Sirens, The Warning, and Northlane.

== Studio ==
From 2002, Bendeth has been working independently as a producer and mixer. In 2005, Bendeth took over Whitney Houston's former Millenium Studios and renamed it House of Loud on the suggestion of Ben Burnley of Breaking Benjamin. The studio became active as a production house and mixing room. It was in the House of Loud that Bendeth recorded and mixed Breaking Benjamin's Dear Agony along with Paramore's Riot!, All Time Low's Nothing Personal, American Idol runner up Crystal Bowersox's record Farmer's Daughter, Of Mice and Men's Restoring Force: Full Circle, Tonight Alive's Limitless and he mixed Bring Me the Horizon's Sempiternal and A Day to Remember's What Separates Me From You. In 2016, The House Of Loud became defunct, with the space becoming a gym, and the studio closing its doors shortly after completing work on Of Mice & Men's album Cold World.

== Selected works ==
- 2025 I See Stars -(band) "The Wheel" (Produced)
- 2022 Ten Years of the Vamps -(band) Best Of (Produced, Mixed)
- 2022 The Warning - Error (The Warning album) (Produced, Mixed, co-writer)
- 2021 Alessia Cara and The Warning - "Enter Sandman" from The Metallica Blacklist (Mixed)
- 2021 I See Stars-(band) (Producer, Mixer)
- 2021 Westside Gunn-(band) "Lucha Bros" (co-writer)
- 2021 Bring Me the Horizon-(band) "Can You Feel My Heart" (Mixed)
- 2020 The Warning - Mayday EP + 6 additional songs for a future LP (3rd Album) (Produced, Mixed, co-writer)
- 2020 Kingsway Collaborations - David Bendeth w/ CVRE & Brandon Leger (writer)
- 2018 Craig David (co-writer, Live in the Moment)
- 2017 Sleeping with Sirens - Gossip (Produced, Mixed, Writer)
- 2017 Northlane - Mesmer (Produced, Mixed, Writer)
- 2016 I Prevail (band) - Lifelines (Mixed)
- 2016 Young Guns (band) - Echoes ( Produced, Mixed, Co-writer)
- 2016 Fire From The Gods (band) - Narrative (Produced, Mixed)
- 2016 Of Mice and Men (band) - Cold World (album) (Produced, Mixed, co-writer)
- 2016 Beartooth - Aggressive (Mixed, Co-Writer)
- 2015 As Lions - (Produced, Mixed)
- 2015 Beartooth - "In Between" (Radio mix)
- 2015 Courage My Love |(Co-Writer)
- 2015 Tonight Alive (Produced, Mixed, Co-Writer)
- 2015 We Came as Romans (Produced, Mixed, Co-Writer)
- 2014 Of Mice and Men - Restoring Force: Full Circle (Produced, Mixed, Co-Writer)
- 2014 Art of Dying - Rise Up (Produced, Mixed, Co-Writer)
- 2014 Coldrain - Until The End (Mixed)
- 2014 Silent Season - "Us All" (single Mix)
- 2014 Defeat The Low - A Nervous Smile (Mixed)
- 2014 The Ghost Inside (band) Dear Youth (Mixed)
- 2014 Crossfaith - EP - (Produced, Mixed, Co-Writer)
- 2014 Sleepwave - Broken Compass (Produced, Mixed, Co-Writer)
- 2013 Heartist - Feeding Fiction (Produced, Mixed, Co-Writer)
- 2013 The Vamps - Meet the Vamps (Produced, Mixed)
- 2013 Marmozets - "Move Shake Hide" (Mixed)
- 2013 Asking Alexandria - From Death to Destiny (Mixed)
- 2013 Bring Me the Horizon - Sempiternal (Mixed)
- 2013 Nightmares - Suspira (Mixed)
- 2013 Jann Klose - Mosaic (Produced, Mixed, Co-Writer)
- 2013 The Dillinger Escape Plan - Happiness Is A Smile (Mixed)
- 2013 Micah Bentley - Let There Be Light EP (Produced, Mixed, Co-Writer)
- 2013 The Red Jumpsuit Apparatus - Et Tu, Brute? (Produced, Mixed, Co-Writer)
- 2013 The Letter Black - Rebuild (Mixed)
- 2013 Smash into Pieces - Stronger (Mixed)
- 2013 Coldrain - The Revelation (Produced, Mixed, Co-Writer)
- 2012 Takida - "Swallow" (Produced, Mixed, Co-Writer)
- 2012 Destine - Illuminate (Mixed)
- 2012 Coldrain - Through Clarity (Produced, Mixed)
- 2012 Picture Me Broken - Corrupt Me (Produced, Mixed, Co-Writer)
- 2012 Our Last Night - Age of Ignorance (Produced, Mixed, Co-Writer)
- 2011 Four Year Strong - In Some Way, Shape or Form (Produced, Mixed, Co-Writer)
- 2011 Forever The Sickest Kids - Forever The Sickest Kids (Produced, Mixed, Co-Writer)
- 2010 Our Last Night - We Will All Evolve (Mixed)
- 2010 Crystal Bowersox -Farmer's Daughter (Produced, Mixed)
- 2010 A Day to Remember – What Separates Me from You (Mixed)
- 2010 Papa Roach - Time for Annihilation (Produced, Mixed, Co-Writer)
- 2010 12 Stones - The Only Easy Day Was Yesterday (Produced, Mixed)
- 2010 Taking Back Sunday - Live at Orensanz (Mixed)
- 2009 Set Your Goals - This Will Be the Death of Us (Mixed)
- 2009 Breaking Benjamin - Dear Agony platinum (Produced, Mixed)
- 2009 It's Alive - It's Alive (Produced, Mixed, Co-Writer)
- 2009 Surrogates Soundtrack (Produced, Mixed)
- 2009 New Medicine - Race You to the Bottom (Mixed)
- 2009 Lenny White - Anomaly (Mixed, Guitar)
- 2009 Mayday Parade - Anywhere but Here (Produced, Mixed, Co-Writer)
- 2009 Cavo - Bright Nights Dark Days (Produced, Mixed, Co-Writer)
- 2009 Set Your Goals - This Will Be the Death of Us (Mixed)
- 2009 Kaiser Chiefs - Off with Their Heads (Mixed)
- 2009 All Time Low - Nothing Personal (Produced, Mixed, Co-Writer)
- 2009 Cavo - Transformers: Revenge of the Fallen – The Album (Produced, Mixed)
- 2009 There For Tomorrow - A Little Faster (Produced, Mixed, Co-Writer)
- 2009 Hedley - The Show Must Go (Produced, Mixed, Co-Writer)
- 2009 You Me at Six - You Me At Six (Mixed)
- 2009 Write This Down - Write This Down (Mixed)
- 2009 Madina Lake - Attics to Eden (Produced, Mixed, Co-Writer)
- 2009 Fightstar - Be Human (Mixed)
- 2009 The Urgency - The Urgency (Produced, Mixed, Co-Writer)
- 2009 Nural - Nural (Produced, Mixed, Co-Writer)
- 2008 Jaymes Reunion - Jaymes Reunion (Mixed)
- 2008 Underoath - Lost in the Sound of Separation gold (Mixed)
- 2008 Allison - Memorama (Mixed)
- 2008 Search the City - Search the City (Mixed)
- 2008 Run Kid Run - Love at the Core (Mixed)
- 2008 Capitol Lights - This is an Outrage! (Mixed)
- 2008 Later Days - "Shake It" & "Everything" (Mixed)
- 2007 Paramore - Riot! (Produced, Mixed, Co-Writer)
- 2007 Dark New Day - Hail Mary (Produced, Mixed, Co-Writer)
- 2007 Your Vegas - A Town and Two Cities (Produced, Mixed, Co-Writer)
- 2007 Dropping Daylight - Bratz: Motion Picture Soundtrack (Produced, Mixed)
- 2008 Hawk Nelson - Hawk Nelson Is My Friend (Produced, Mixed, Co-Writer)
- 2007 Chiodos - Bone Palace Ballet (Mixed)
- 2007 The Almost - Southern Weather (Produced, Mixed)
- 2007 Bruce Hornsby - Goin' Home: A Tribute to Fats Domino (Mixed)
- 2007 Serena Ryder - Serena (Produced, Mixed, Co-Writer)
- 2007 God or Julie - God or Julie (Produced, Mixed)
- 2007 Bloodsimple - Bloodsimple EP (Mixed)
- 2006 Carl Cox - Second Sign (Writer)
- 2006 Course of Nature - Damaged (Produced, Mixed, Co-Writer)
- 2006 Chiodos - Chiodos Acoustic Mix (Mixed)
- 2006 In Flames - Come Clarity (Mixed)
- 2006 The Red Jumpsuit Apparatus - "Face Down" (Produced, Mixed)
- 2006 Ima Robot - "Creeps Me Out" (Produced, Mixed, Co-Writer)
- 2006 Breaking Benjamin - Phobia (Produced, Mixed)
- 2006 Pillar - The Reckoning (Mixed)
- 2005 The Red Jumpsuit Apparatus - Don't You Fake It (Produced, Mixed)
- 2005 Hawthorne Heights - If Only You Were Lonely Gold (Produced, Mixed)
- 2005 Carl Cox - Second Sign (Produced, Mixed, Co-Writer)
- 2005 Ima Robot - Monument to the Masses (Produced, Mixed, Co-Writer)
- 2005 Blindside - Blindside (Mixed)
- 2005 Clutch - Clutch (Mixed)
- 2005 Breaking Benjamin - Queen Tribute (Produced, Mixed)
- 2005 The Chemistry - The Chemistry (Mixed)
- 2005 Dropping Daylight - Brace Yourself (Produced, Mixed)
- 2005 Fivespeed - Morning Over Midnight (Produced, Mixed, Co-Writer)
- 2005 Various artists - Jazz Funk Sessions (Produced, Mixed, Co-Writer)
- 2005 Antigone Rising - Don't Look Back - (Produced, Mixed)
- 2005 Breaking Benjamin - Halo 2 Original Soundtrack (Produced, Mixed)
- 2004 Killswitch Engage - The End of Heartache - Resident Evil Soundtrack and Single Release Gold (Mixed)
- 2004 Breaking Benjamin - We Are Not Alone (Produced, Mixed)
- 2004 Future Leaders of the World - Everyday (Mixed)
- 2004 The Underwater - Various Tracks (Produced, Mixed)
- 2004 Bruce Hornsby - Greatest Radio Hits (Produced, Mixed)
- 2004 Ari Hest - They're On to Me (Mixed)
- 2004 Candiria - What Doesn't Kill You... (Produced, Mixed, Co-Writer)
- 2004 Magna-Fi - Magna-Fi (Mixed)
- 2004 Parmalee - Inside (Produced, Mixed)
- 2004 Crossfade - Crossfade (Mixed)
- 2004 Hellboy- soundtrack and movie trailer (Produced, Mixed)
- 2004 Fivewise - Out of Line (Produced, Mixed)
- 2004 ill niño - Live from the Eye of the Storm (Mixed)
- 2004 Kon and Amir - Uncle Junior's Friday Fish Fry (Produced, Mixed, Co-Writer)
- 2004 40 Below Summer - The Texas Chainsaw Masscre soundtrack (Produced, Mixed, Co-Writer)
- 2003 Vertical Horizon - "You're a God" (Produced)
- 2003 ill niño - Confession (Mixed)
- 2003 40 Below Summer - The Mourning After (Produced, Mixed, Co-Writer)
- 2003 The Gadjits - The Gadjits (Produced, Mixed)
- 2002 Elvis Presley - Elvis 30 #1 Hits (Produced, Mixed)
- 2002 SR-71 - Tomorrow Gold (Produced, Mixed)
- 2002 Elvis Presley - Lilo & Stitch (Produced, Mixed)
- 2002 Joey Negro - Joey Negro Compilation (Produced, Mixed, Co-Writer)
- 2001 Bruce Hornsby - Big Swing Face (Produced, Mixed, Co-Writer)
- 2000 Jay Hannan/Ben Watt - Lazy Dog (Produced, Mixed, Co-Writer)
- 1999 SR-71 - Now You See Inside (Produced, Mixed)
- 1999 Vertical Horizon - Live 5.1 Tourbook Surround (Mixed)
- 1998 Vertical Horizon - Everything You Want (Produced, Mixed)
- 1998 Bruce Hornsby - Spirit Trail (Guitar)
- 1995 Varga - Oxygen (Produced, Mixed)
- 1995 Treble Charger - Maybe It's Me (Produced, Mixed)
- 1995 Love and Sas - Call My Name (Produced, Mixed, Co-Writer)
- 1995 Crash Test Dummies - Dumb and Dumber soundtrack (A&R)
- 1993 For Love or Money - soundtrack (Produced, Mixed, Co-Writer)
- 1993 Varga - Prototype (Produced, Mixed)
- 1991 Sven Gali - Sven Gali Gold (Produced, Mixed)
- 1991 Big House - Big House (Produced) Gold
- 1990 Regatta - Wherever You Run (Produced, Mixed)
- 1988 Joe Cocker - Two Wrongs Don't Make a Right (Co-Writer)
- 1988 Platinum Blonde - Contact (Produced, Mixed, Co-Writer)
- 1987 Tú - Tú (Produced, Mixed)
- 1987 Eye Eye - Flash (Produced)
- 1986 Billy Newton-Davis - Deeper (Produced, Mixed, Co-Writer)
- 1985 Jeff Beck - "Ecstasy" (Co-Writer)
- 1985 Platinum Blonde - Alien Shores (Mixed)
- 1984 4 Reasons Unknown - 4 Reasons Unknown (Produced, Mixed, Co-Writer)
- 1984 Ronnie Hawkins Look out time (Mixed)
- 1984 Various artists - Classic Jazz Funk Mastercuts #4-(Produced, Mixed, Co-Writer)
- 1984 Teenage Head - Tornado (Produced, Mixed)
- 1983 Wrabbit - West Side Kid (Produced, Mixed)
- 1983 Teenage Head - Some Kinda Fun (Mixed)
- 1982 The Extras - Big Parts (Produced, Mixed)
- 1982 David Bendeth - The David Bendeth Band (Produced, Mixed, Writer)
- 1981 Leroy Sibbles and The Heptones - On Top (Guitar)
- 1981 Philip Rambow - Jungle Law (Guitar)
- 1981 David Bendeth - Just Dessert (Produced, Mixed, Writer)
- 1980 Light of the World - Round Trip (Guitar)
- 1980 David Bendeth/Billy Cobham - David Bendeth/Billy Cobham (Writer)
- 1979 David Bendeth - Adrenalin (Writer)
- 1978 Dwayne Ford - Needless Freaking (Guitar)
- 1978 B. B. Gabor - BB Gabor (Guitar)
- 1978 Bob Segarini - Gotta Have Pop (Guitar)
- 1977 Orchestre national du Capitole de Toulouse - Toulouse (Guitar)
