= Platinum Blonde (EP) =

EP by Platinum Blonde
- Released: 1983
- Recorded: Metalworks, Mississauga, Ontario
- Genre: New wave
- Label: CBS Canada - 80084
- Producer: David Tickle

Platinum Blonde chronology
Platinum Blonde (1983)	Standing in the Dark (1984)

Platinum Blonde is the self-titled debut EP by Platinum Blonde released in 1983. The EP was only released on vinyl and cassette and is also known as Six Track Attack. It reached a high of #65 on the Canadian RPM charts in early 1984, before being subsequently re-released with four additional tracks as the full-length Standing in the Dark album in 1984.

== Background and writing ==
In 1983, following the formation of their new band, Platinum Blonde recorded a 7-song demo tape in a friend's living room and sent it to English producer David Tickle who expressed immediate interest in the project. The next week they met at Metalworks studios just outside Toronto to begin recording and within three weeks produced a 6-song EP of new wave rock. CBS Records Canada then picked up the EP and the first single "Doesn't Really Matter" was released to Canadian radio in the fall of 1983. It became the fastest selling debut by a Canadian artist in the label's history at the time, peaking at #39 on the Canadian album charts.

The resulting attention allowed the band to return to the studio with Tickle and record four more songs to make a complete album called Standing in the Dark which was then released in early 1984.

Platinum Blonde is re-issuing its self-titled six-song EP from 1983 on vinyl. Date is not yet revealed.

== Track listing ==
Side 1

1. "Take it From Me" (Mark Holmes, Sergio Galli) - 3:56
2. "Video Disease" (Holmes) - 3:43
3. "Not in Love" (Holmes, Galli) - 4:04

Side 2

4. "Doesn't Really Matter" (Holmes, Galli) - 3:58
5. "All Fall Down" (Holmes) - 4:13
6. "Cinderella Story" (Galli) - 1:51

== Sources ==
- Liner notes from Platinum Blonde CD Seven Year Itch: 1982-1989
