= Kenny MacLean =

Scottish-born Canadian musician

- Occupations: Singer; musician; songwriter
- Instruments: Vocals; guitar
- Years active: 1978–2008

Kenneth Irving MacLean (January 9, 1956 – November 24, 2008) was a Scottish-Canadian musician, best known as a member of the multi-platinum selling band Platinum Blonde.

== Biography ==
MacLean was born in Glasgow on January 9, 1956.

== Musical career ==
A former hairdresser, he was a member of the group The Hairdressers, and then was a founding member of The Suspects in 1979. He then joined The Deserters in 1981, and released two albums, The Deserters and Siberian Nightlife.

Drummer Chris Steffler, who had worked with MacLean in Toronto bands The Next and The Suspects, recruited MacLean to join Platinum Blonde. MacLean was bassist and keyboardist, and songwriter for some songs, on their 1985 album Alien Shores. He was also part of the band for Contact in 1987, and for their 1990 album Yeah Yeah Yeah, when the band was renamed The Blondes. MacLean then released two solo albums in the 1990s, without the backing of major-label financing. In 1990, his solo debut Don't Look Back was released on a new label, Justin, and it won him a SOCAN Award for songwriting, as well as a Juno Award nomination for Most Promising Male Vocalist in 1991.

In 2006, MacLean spent time in Saint John, New Brunswick, working as a teacher at the city's new Atlantica School of Music and Film. MacLean created the music company hMh Music, and was its artistic director. An academy officially opened in Toronto on September 2, 2008, and featured programs such as audio engineering and DJ arts.

MacLean had a big influence in getting Platinum Blonde back together after a 20-year absence, but he wouldn't live to see it come to fruition. MacLean had commented to Platinum Blonde's lead singer Mark Holmes "hundreds of times" that Platinum Blonde should re-unite. Holmes once quoted MacLean as saying, "Let’s get back together. Music doesn't have any rock stars anymore." In November 2008, Holmes took up MacLean's long-standing offer to make a guest appearance at one of his shows at the Mod Club in Toronto, a club founded by Holmes, and they performed a collection of Platinum Blonde hits.

MacLean died of a heart related problem on November 24, 2008, after performing at the Mod Club the night before. His body was found by his sister, and recording artist Brock Burford. His third solo CD, Completely, was released at a concert three days before his death.

== Discography ==
=== Solo albums ===
Title	Album details	Chart
Title	Album details	CAN
Don't Look Back	Released: 1990; Label: Justin Entertainment Inc.	77
Clear	Released: 1995; Label: Page Publications Inc.	—
Completely	Released: 2010; Label: Duke Street Records	—
"—" denotes a recording that did not chart or was not released in that territory.

=== Singles ===
Year	Single	Peak chart positions		Album
Year	Single	CAN	CAN AC	Album
1990	"Don't Look Back"	25	10	Don't Look Back
1990	"Rescue Me"	29	—	Don't Look Back
1990	"Don't You Know It"	57	—	Don't Look Back
