= Now & Never =

Studio album by Platinum Blonde
- Released: August 21, 2012
- Genre: Rock, pop, pop rock, dance rock
- Producer: Murray Daigle, Rob Laidlaw, Mark Holmes

Platinum Blonde chronology
Yeah Yeah Yeah (1990)	Now & Never (2012)

Now & Never is the fifth studio album by the Canadian rock band Platinum Blonde. It is notable as their first album of new material (under the name Platinum Blonde) in the 25 years since 1987's Contact. It was also their first new album in 22 years under any name; the group's fourth album, Yeah Yeah Yeah, was issued in 1990 and credited to The Blondes.

The first single from the album, "Beautiful" was released on June 18, 2012.

== Background and writing ==
After their last official cross-Canada tour ended in 2000, Platinum Blonde's frontman Mark Holmes released a solo album and worked as a DJ at The Mod Club in Toronto, Ontario. In 2010, Holmes decided the time was right to renew the band: "All the bands that I was doing remixes for lately seem to sound like Platinum Blonde. So I thought it might be the right time for a dose of the real thing."

In 2010, Holmes invited bassist Rob Laidlaw (known for his work with Honeymoon Suite) to join the band and hooked back up with co founding member Sergio Galli (guitar). This is the lineup that is touring the new material in 2012.

Holmes was inspired by MacLean during the development of the album: "He [MacLean] may not have been writing or doing those backing vocals, but when I think of backing vocals, I think of him. Close my eyes, think what would he do? I try to do it."

== Release and promotion ==
On August 20, 2012 the band appeared on Citytv's Breakfast Television in Toronto to promote the new album. They performed "Beautiful" and their classic hit "It Doesn't Really Matter" live in the studio. The album was released on August 21, 2012.

== Track listing ==
All songs written by Mark Holmes.

1. "Valentine"
2. "Beautiful"
3. "Satellite"
4. "From Here"
5. "We Are Calling"
6. "Future Dance"
7. "Garden"
8. "Independence Day"
9. "Shined"
10. "Sing To Me"

== Credits ==
Platinum Blonde:

- Sergio Galli: guitars, backing vocals
- Mark Holmes: vocals
- Robert Laidlaw: bass, backing vocals
- Daniel Todd: drums, backing vocals

with:

- Murray Daigle: guitars, programming
