= Big Swing Face =

Big Swing Face may refer to:

- Big Swing Face (Buddy Rich Big Band album), 1967
- Big Swing Face (Bruce Hornsby album), 2002
