= Standing in the Dark =

Standing in the Dark may refer to:

- Standing in the Dark (album), a 1983 album by Platinum Blonde, as well as the album's title song
- "Standing in the Dark" (song), a 2012 song by Lawson
- "Standing in the Dark", a song by Brett Kissel from the 2023 album The Compass Project
- "Standing in the Dark", a song by Nickelback from the 2022 album Get Rollin'
- "Standing in the Dark", a two-part episode of Degrassi: The Next Generation
