= Love Don't Live Here Anymore (disambiguation) =

"Love Don't Live Here Anymore" is a 1978 song by Rose Royce, later covered by a number of artists.

Love Don't Live Here Anymore may also refer to:

- "Love Don't Live Here Anymore", a 1999 song by Kenny Rogers from She Rides Wild Horses
- "Love Don't Live Here Anymore", a 1978 song by Kris Kristofferson and Rita Coolidge from Natural Act
- "Love Don't Live Here Anymore", a 1985 song by Modern Talking from Let's Talk About Love
- "Love Don't Live Here Anymore", a 1992 song by Sven Gali from Sven Gali

== See also ==
- Love Don't Live Here (disambiguation)
