= Stay (Destine song) =

Single by Destine

from the album Illuminate
- Released: June 19, 2011
- Recorded: 2011
- Genre: Pop Punk
- Length: 3:19
- Label: Sony Music
- Songwriter(s): Robin Van Loenen
- Producer(s): James Paul Wisner

Destine singles chronology
| "Down" (2010) | "Stay" (2011) | "Thousand Miles" (2011) |

"Stay" was the first single from the Dutch pop punk band Destine from their second studio album, Illuminate. The song was released on June 19, 2011 and received significant airplay. It was their second single to climb onto the Netherlands Top 40 chart.

A music video directed by the bands keyboard player Laurens Troost & Sitcom Soldiers was released on June 24, 2011.

On August 10, the band released an instrumental version of "Stay" for free download at MediaFire. It was released for fans to record their version of the song and post videos of them singing it YouTube wherein winners would be chosen to perform with Destine live on their October headline tour in central Europe. The winners were announced on September 1 but the link nor download was never shut down.

== Track listing ==
iTunes single

| No. | Title | Writer(s) | Length |
|---|---|---|---|
| 1. | "Stay" | Robin Van Loenen | 3:19 |

== Chart positions ==
| Country | Chart | Position |
|---|---|---|
| Netherlands | Top 40 | 26 |
