= Illuminate (Destine album) =

Album by Destine

Studio album by Destine
- Released: March 30, 2012
- Genre: Alternative rock, pop punk, emo
- Length: 36:51
- Label: Rude Records
- Producer: James Paul Wisner

Destine chronology
Lightspeed (2010)	Illuminate (2012)	Forevermore (2015)

Singles from Illuminate
- 1. "Thousand Miles" Released: September 30, 2012; 2. "Stay" Released: June 16, 2011; 3. "Night Skies" Released: March 7, 2012; 4. "All the People" Released: June 1, 2012; 5. "Wait Forever (UK exclusive)" Released: July 9, 2012

Illuminate is the second album by the Dutch rock band Destine. It was released March 30, 2012, and the same date on iTunes. Three of the songs were released before the album as singles (Stay, Thousand Miles and Night Skies) and music video of Stay and Thousand Miles is available on YouTube.

== Track listing ==
No.	Title	Writer(s)	Length
1.	"Four Leaf Clover"	Robin Van Loenen	3:09
2.	"Stay"	Robin Van Loenen	3:20
3.	"All the People"	Robin Van Loenen	3:41
4.	"Wait Forever"	Robin Van Loenen	3:06
5.	"Thousand Miles"	Robin Van Loenen	3:40
6.	"Unbreakable"	Robin Van Loenen	3:16
7.	"Night Skies"	Robin Van Loenen	3:28
8.	"Best Kept Secret"	Robin Van Loenen	4:11
9.	"The Awakening"	Robin Van Loenen	3:33
10.	"Illuminate"	Robin Van Loenen	5:27

== Personnel ==
Destine

- Robin van Loenen - lead vocals, rhythm guitar
- Hubrecht Eversdijk - lead guitar, backing vocals
- Laurens Troost - keyboards, synthesizers, backing vocals
- Tom Vorstius Kruijff - bass guitar, backing vocals
- Jordy Datema - drums

Production

- James Paul Wisner - production, mixing
- David Bendeth - mixing
- Troy Glessner - masterting

== Charts ==
Country	Position
Netherlands	42

== Release history ==
Region	Date	Label
World	February 1, 2012	Rude Records
iTunes Store	March 30, 2012	Rude Records
Japan	June 20, 2012	Rude Records
