= Sven Gali (album) =

Studio album by Sven Gali
- Released: 1992
- Genre: Hard rock
- Length: 45:00
- Label: BMG
- Producer: David Bendeth

Sven Gali chronology
Sven Gali (1992)	Inwire (1995)

Singles from Sven Gali
- 1. "Under the Influence" Released: 1992; 2. "Love Don't Live Here Anymore" Released: 1992; 3. "In My Garden" Released: 1993; 4. "Tie Dyed Skies" Released: 1993

Professional ratings
Review scores
Source	Rating
AllMusic	4/5 stars

Sven Gali is the debut album by Canadian hard rock/heavy metal metal band, Sven Gali. It was produced by BMG Canada's David Bendeth and released in 1992. The album includes the singles "Under the Influence", "Love Don't Live Here Anymore", "In My Garden", and "Tie Dyed Skies". It also included a cover of the Teenage Head song "Disgusteen" featuring guest vocals by Frankie Venom. The band made four music videos, all of which were on regular rotation on Much Music.

The album eventually went gold in Canada and was nominated for Hard Rock Album of the Year at the 1993 Juno Awards.

== Track listing ==
No.	Title	Length
1.	"Under the Influence"	3:59
2.	"Tie Dyed Skies"	3:40
3.	"Sweet Little Gypsy"	3:48
4.	"In My Garden"	5:04
5.	"Freakz"	3:49
6.	"Love Don't Live Here Anymore"	3:47
7.	"Stiff Competition"	3:47
8.	"Real Thing"	3:19
9.	"Whisper in the Rain"	3:46
10.	"25 Hours A Day"	3:28
11.	"Here Today, Gone Tomorrow"	3:34
12.	"Disgusteen"	3:04
Total length:		45:00
