= Thousand Miles (Destine song) =

Single by Destine

from the album Illuminate
- Released: September 30, 2011
- Recorded: 2011
- Genre: Pop Punk
- Length: 3:37
- Label: Sony Music
- Songwriters: Anders Bagge, Johan Kronlund, Robin Van Leonen
- Producer: James Paul Wisner

Destine singles chronology
| "Stay" (2011) | "Thousand Miles" (2011) | "Night Skies" (2012) |

"Thousand Miles" is the second single from the Dutch pop punk band Destine from their second studio album. The song was released on September 30, 2011 and received significant airplay. It is their only single to date not to chart on the Netherlands Top 40 chart. As of September 28, 2011, every one who "tweeded" the band through Twitter received the single for free.

A music video directed by the bands keyboard player Laurens Troost was released on September 30, 2011.

== Track listing ==
iTunes single

| No. | Title | Writer(s) | Length |
|---|---|---|---|
| 1. | "Thousand Miles" | Anders Bagge, Johan Kronlund, Robin Van Leonen | 3:37 |
