= Sven Gali =

Canadian rock band

- Origin: Hamilton, Ontario, Canada
- Genres: Hard rock, grunge, heavy metal
- Years active: 1987–1996, 2017–Present
- Label: BMG Canada
- Members: Dave Wanless; Andy Frank; Shawn Minden; Sean Williamson; Dan Fila
- Website: Sven Gali on Facebook

Sven Gali is a Canadian hard rock band which originally started as a cover band in 1987 in Hamilton, Ontario, and Niagara Falls, Ontario. The 2018 line-up includes all three remaining original members: Dave Wanless (vocals), Andy Frank (guitar), Shawn Minden (bass); as well as new members Sean Williamson (guitar) and Dan Fila (drums).

== History ==
=== Early days and Sven Gali: 1987–1993 ===
Sven Gali played covers locally for several years. In 1989, shortly after changing their setlist to 20% covers and 80% originals, drummer Steve Macgregor left the band he named and formed and was replaced by Rob MacEachern. Sven Gali earned a reputation for their live shows. On the strength of their original songs and live shows, they were signed to BMG Canada, after playing some key gigs in New York and Los Angeles. They were signed to a seven-album contract, with international release through BMG subsidiary Ariola. As they began recording an album, the band collectively decided to fire MacEachern and hire former Billy Idol drummer Gregg Gerson. Gerson, their third drummer, had previously played with Roger Daltrey, Mick Jagger, and Mick Jones. With this new line-up intact, they released their debut album in 1992.

Sven Gali was produced by BMG Canada's David Bendeth. The album included the singles and videos for "Under The Influence", "Tie Dyed Skies", "In My Garden", and the ballad, "Love Don't Live Here Anymore". It included a cover of the Teenage Head song, "Disgusteen", featuring guest vocals by Frankie Venom. The band made four music videos, all of which were on regular rotation on Much Music. The video for "Under the Influence" won the MuchMusic Best Metal Video award in 1993. Sven Gali eventually went gold in Canada. In 1992 through 1994, the band toured Canada and the US, Germany, Belgium, Ireland and the UK, headlining and supporting acts including Wolfsbane, Foreigner, Meat Loaf, April Wine, and Def Leppard.

=== Inwire and breakup: 1994–1996 ===
The 1993 Juno Awards recognized Sven Gali and they were nominated for two awards, "Most Promising Group" and "Hard Rock Album Of The Year". Shortly after this, the band began to work on their second album. They recorded in Seattle, with production duties handled by future Queensrÿche guitarist Kelly Gray. Prior to this, Gerson left the band and was replaced by their fourth drummer, Mike Ferguson. Ferguson and Gray had previously played together in a Seattle band called Dog Daze. The album, called Inwire (1995), featured guest musicians Christopher Thorn of Blind Melon, and Candlebox's Kevin Martin and Scott Mercado. This second album had a distinctly different sound, which the band called an experiment, and which was influenced by Gray. Old Sven Gali fans did not respond well to their change of sound, and the band were heavily criticized for what was perceived as jumping on the grunge rock bandwagon. The band toured behind Inwire, until 1996, when the group disbanded.

=== Reunion, 3, and Bombs and Battlescars ===
On August 11, 2007, Sven Gali reunited and played live for the first time in over 11 years at The Moose N Goose in Thorold, Ontario. Rob MacEachern returned on drums as a member. The concert was recorded and is planned to be released on DVD in the future.

Guitarist Dee Cernile was diagnosed with cancer, and two benefit concerts were held for him on August 1 and 7, 2009. Originally it was not known if Cernile would be able to play, so his brother Walter was tapped to fill in if need be. Cernile did play guitar on both nights, and according to former Slash Puppet vocalist Mif, "if I didn't know any better I wouldn't know that there was anything wrong with the [...] guy. He was shredding all [...] night." Dee Cernile died of lung cancer on February 25, 2012, aged 46.

A new single called "Kill the Lies" was released in 2018. The band also announced tour dates in Canada and Great Britain. "You Wont Break Me" followed in 2019 and the latest single "Now" was released in 2020. The EP 3 was released on June 12, 2020. In 2023, they released their third and first new studio album in nearly three decades Bombs and Battlescars.

== Discography ==
=== Studio albums ===
- Sven Gali (1992) BMG Canada
- Inwire (1995) BMG Canada
- Bombs and Battlescars (2023) Music In Motion Entertainment

=== Extended plays ===
- 3 (2020) RFL Records

=== Live albums ===
- Live at the El Mocambo (2025) Deko Entertainment

== Singles ==
- "Love Don't Live Here Anymore" (1993)
- "Kill the Lies" (2018)

== Videos ==
- "Whisper In the Rain" (1990)
- "Under the Influence" (1992)
- "Tie Dyed Skies" (1993)
- "Here in My Garden" (1993)
- "Love Don't Live Here Anymore" (1993)
- "What You Give" (1995)
- "Keeps Me Down" (1995)
- "Kill the Lies" (2018)
- "You Wont Break Me" (2019)
- "Now" (2020)

== Members ==
- Dave Wanless – lead vocals (1987–present)
- Andy Frank – guitar (1987–present)
- Sean Williamson – guitar (2018–present)
- Shawn "T.T." Minden – bass (1987–present)
- Dan Fila – drums (2018–present) (see: Varga)

== Past members ==
- Dee Cernile – guitar (1987–2012; died)
- Steve Macgregor – drums (1987–1989)
- Rob MacEachern – drums (1989–1991, 2007–2009)
- Gregg Gerson – drums (1991–1993)
- Mike Ferguson – drums (1994–1996)
- Roger Habel Jr. – drums (2008–2017; touring)

== Member activity ==
Most of the members of Sven Gali are active elsewhere.

- Dave Wanless has, as of 2005, also fronted The Betty Ford Band in the Niagara region.
- Andy Frank has also been working in China as of 2005.
- Shawn Minden has been working with George H. Ross the VP to the Trump Organization NYC to raise funds for the Billie & George Ross foundation and is the founder of GS Maher Property Holdings Ltd an Investment real-estate company with ties to NYC and playing with Forgotten Rebels since 2005.
- Steve MacGregor left Sven Gali to form Electra records recording artist Monkey Head whose debut album was produced by Beau Hill.
- Rob MacEachern joined Helix in February 2009 and stayed until October of that year. He has performed on three Helix albums.
- As of 2005, Gregg Gerson has been an educator as well as composer of music for TV advertisement and film.
- Dee Cernile had been living in Los Angeles since 2005; he died of cancer in 2012.
