= Contact (Platinum Blonde album) =

Studio album by Platinum Blonde
- Released: 1987
- Genre: Funk rock
- Label: CBS Canada - 80105
- Producer: Mark Holmes, David Bendeth, Bernard Edwards, John Dexter

Platinum Blonde chronology
Alien Shores (1985)	Contact (1987)	Yeah Yeah Yeah (1990)

Singles from Contact
- 1. "Contact" Released: 1987; 2. "Connect Me" Released: 1987; 3. "Fire" Released: 1988; 4. "If You Go This Time" Released: 1988

Contact is the third studio album by the Canadian band Platinum Blonde, released in 1987. It sold more than 150,000 copies in its first year of release. The album reached a high of 25 for 3 weeks on the Canadian charts. The first single was the title track; its video was shot at Lamport Stadium. Another music video was filmed for the second track, "Connect Me".

The supporting tour was a disappointment, with the band forced to cancel dates due to low ticket sales; the band claimed that the cancellations were due to substance abuse issues.

== Production ==
CBS Canada pushed the band to adopt a style that would appeal to U.S. album-oriented rock radio stations; the company admitted its mistake when Canadian sales declined. Leroy "Sugarfoot" Bonner sang on the cover version of "Fire".

== Critical reception ==
Professional ratings
Review scores
Source	Rating
AllMusic	3/5 stars

The Gazette wrote that "lead singer Mark Holmes has little or no vocal personality, but at least this time he keeps the whining to a minimum." The Vancouver Sun determined that Platinum Blonde "do a pretty fair Duran Duran imitation, only their lyrics are a little dumber, their melodies aren't as catchy and ... they don't exactly measure up in the looks department, either." The Ottawa Citizen called the album "reminiscent, although not imitative, of the metalized funk of Power Station."

The Kingston Whig-Standard deemed the band "talented craftsman who do deserve respect if not superstardom." The Toronto Star labeled Contact "an album rooted in the hot, street-tough funk of New York City, not in the fluff of snow-covered hockey arenas, suburban high school dances or video dreams."

== Track list ==
Side one
No.	Title	Writer(s)	Producer(s)	Length
1.	"Contact"	Mark Holmes, Kenny MacLean, David Bendeth	Holmes, Bendeth	3:56
2.	"Connect Me"	Sergio Galli, MacLean	Holmes, Bendeth	3:46
3.	"Diamonds"	Holmes	Holmes, Bendeth	3:11
4.	"If You Go This Time"	Holmes, MacLean, Chris Wardman	Holmes, John Dexter	3:59
5.	"System"	Holmes, Galli, MacLean	Bernard Edwards	3:25

Side two
No.	Title	Writer(s)	Producer(s)	Length
1.	"Fire"	Ohio Players	Holmes, Bendeth	3:51
2.	"Tough Enough"	Holmes	Edwards	3:30
3.	"Automatic Drive"	Holmes	Holmes, Bendeth	3:46
4.	"Chaperone Sally"	Holmes, Galli, MacLean	Holmes	3:33
5.	"I Might Have You"	Holmes, MacLean	Holmes, Bendeth	3:17
6.	"Beauty of the Beast"	Holmes, MacLean, Bendeth	Holmes, Bendeth	3:46

== Credits ==
Platinum Blonde:

- Sergio Galli: guitar, backing vocals
- Mark Holmes: lead and backing vocals, guitar
- Kenny MacLean: bass, guitar, keyboards, backing vocals
- Sascha Tukatsch: drums, percussion

with:

- David Bendeth: guitar
- Jeff Bova: keyboards
- Michelle Cobbs: backing vocals
- Claude Desjardins: percussion, keyboards, drums
- Bernard Edwards: bass
- Peter Fredette: backing vocals
- Eddie Martinez: guitar
- B. J. Nelson: backing vocals
- Lou Pomanti: bass, keyboards
- Fonzi Thornton of Chic (band): backing vocals
- Uptown Horns: horns
- Tony Thompson: drums, percussion
- Tom Weir: drums, percussion

Engineers

- Jay Mark, Scott Church, Don Wershba, Bruce Robbins, Randy Staub
