= Not in Love (Platinum Blonde song) =

1984 single by Platinum Blonde

Single by Platinum Blonde

from the EP Platinum Blonde
- Released: October 1984
- Genre: New wave
- Length: 3:59
- Label: CBS
- Songwriter(s): Mark Holmes, Sergio Galli
- Producer(s): David Tickle

Platinum Blonde singles chronology
"Standing in the Dark" (1984)	"Not in Love" (1984)	"Take It from Me" (1985)

Audio
- "Not in Love" on YouTube

"Not in Love" is a song by Canadian new wave band Platinum Blonde from the band's self-titled debut EP, Platinum Blonde (1983). It was released as a 7" single in October 1984 through CBS.

== Track listing ==
- Canadian 7" single

A. "Not in Love" – 3:59
B. "Video Disease" – 3:43

== Personnel ==
Platinum Blonde

- Sergio Galli – guitar, vocals
- Mark Holmes – bass, keyboards
- Chris Steffler – drums, percussion

Technical personnel

- David Tickle – engineering, production

== Charts ==
Chart (1984)	Peak position
Canada RPM Top Singles	44

== Crystal Castles version ==
In 2010, "Not in Love" was covered by the Canadian electronic duo Crystal Castles for their second studio album, Crystal Castles II. A single version, which features Robert Smith of The Cure on lead vocals, was released as a single via their YouTube channel on October 26, 2010.
