= Lightspeed (album) =

Studio album by Destine
- Released: February 1, 2010
- Recorded: 2008–2009 at Wisner Studios, St. Cloud, Florida.
- Genre: Alternative rock, pop punk
- Length: 41:45
- Label: Sony Music
- Producer: James Paul Wisner

Destine chronology
A Dozen Dreams EP (2006)	Lightspeed (2010)	Illuminate (2012)

Singles from Lightspeed
- 1. "In Your Arms" Released: May 8, 2009; 2. "Stars" Released: August 14, 2009; 3. "Spiders" Released: January 15, 2010; 4. "Down" Released: October 1, 2010

Lightspeed is the debut album by the Dutch rock band Destine. It was released February 1, 2010, and January 29, 2010, on iTunes. Prior to the release of the album, seven of the twelve songs were released on the singles "Stars" and "In Your Arms".

== Track listing ==
All lyrics are written by Robin van Loenen; all music is composed by Robin van Loenen, Hubrecht Eversdijk, Laurens Troost, Tom Vorstius Kruijff, and Robin Faas, except where noted.

No.	Title	Writer(s)	Length
1.	"In Your Arms"	Bart Voncken/Robin Van Loenen	3:25
2.	"Everything in Me"	Robin Van Loenen	2:37
3.	"Burn"	Robin Van Loenen	3:06
4.	"Stars"	Robin Van Loenen	3:07
5.	"Where Are You Now?"	Robin Van Loenen	2:53
6.	"Spiders"	Robin Van Loenen	3:40
7.	"Forget About Me"	Robin Van Loenen	3:12
8.	"Wake Me"	Robin Van Loenen	3:45
9.	"Sinking Sand"	Robin Van Loenen	2:57
10.	"Am I So Blind?"	Robin Van Loenen	3:32
11.	"California Summer"	Robin Van Loenen	3:56
12.	"In the End"	Robin Van Loenen	5:29
Total length:			41:45

=== Bonus tracks ===
Japanese bonus tracks'
No.	Title	Music	Length
13.	"Down (Jay Sean cover)"	K. Jhooti, D. Carter, J-Remy, Bobby Bass, Jared Cotter & J Perkins	3:19
14.	"Night Skies (Demo)"	Robin Van Loenen	3:30
15.	"The Disappointment (Remix)"	Robin Van Loenen	3:03

== Personnel ==
Destine

- Robin van Loenen - Lead vocals, rhythm guitar
- Hubrecht Eversdijk - Lead guitar, backing vocals
- Laurens Troost - Keyboards, synthesizers, backing vocals
- Tom Vorstius Kruijff - Bass guitar, backing vocals
- Robin Faas - Drums

Artwork

- Hubrecht Eversdijk - Album Design
- Gage Young - Photography

Production

- James Paul Wisner - Producer, mixing
- Troy Glessner – Mastering at Spectre Studio, Renton, WA
- Jason Adams – Assistant Engineer
- Brooks Paschal – Assistant Engineer

== Charts ==
Album

Chart (2010)	Peak position
Netherlands Album Charts	22

Singles

Year	Song	Chart	Position
2009	In Your Arms	Dutch Single Top 100	77
2009	Stars	Dutch Single Top 100	76
2010	Spiders	Dutch Single Top 100	62
2010	Down	Dutch Single Top 100	78

== Release history ==
Region	Date	Label
iTunes Store	January 29, 2010	Sony Music
Europe	February 1, 2010	Sony Music
Japan	August 3, 2011	Kick Rock Music
