= Situation Critical (song) =

1985 song by Platinum Blonde

Single by Platinum Blonde

from the album Alien Shores
- B-side: "Out of Time"
- Released: 1985
- Genre: Rock
- Length: 3:27
- Label: CBS
- Songwriter: Mark Holmes
- Producers: Eddy Offord, Mark Holmes

Platinum Blonde singles chronology
"Crying Over You" (1985)	"Situation Critical" (1985)	"Somebody Somewhere" (1985)

Audio
- "Situation Critical" on YouTube

"Situation Critical" is a 1985 song by Canadian band Platinum Blonde from their album Alien Shores. The song reached number 8 on the Canadian chart in 1985 making it their second top 10 hit in Canada after "Crying Over You". The song plays at 122 BPM in 4/4 time signature, and is in C♯ minor. Lead singer Mark Holmes was interviewed by radio station BOOM 97.3 about the song. It was also the opening track for the album.

== Music video ==
The music video features a car pulling up and a woman taking photos with her camera, while the band performs the song on a stage, and was directed by Champagne Pictures.

== Charts ==
Chart (1985)	Peak position
Canada Top Singles (RPM)	8
