= Restoring Force (album) =

Studio album by Of Mice & Men
- Released: January 24, 2014
- Recorded: 2013
- Studios: House of Loud, Elmwood Park, New Jersey
- Genres: Nu metal; alternative metal; metalcore
- Length: 38:37
- Label: Rise
- Producer: David Bendeth

Of Mice & Men chronology
The Flood (2011)	Restoring Force (2014)	Live at Brixton (2016)

Singles from Restoring Force
- 1. "You're Not Alone" Released: December 2, 2013; 2. "Bones Exposed" Released: December 23, 2013; 3. "Would You Still Be There" Released: May 15, 2014; 4. "Feels Like Forever" Released: October 23, 2014; 5. "Broken Generation" Released: February 5, 2015; 6. "Never Giving Up" Released: February 21, 2015

Restoring Force: Full Circle
- Artwork used for the deluxe reissue album cover.

Restoring Force is the third studio album by American rock band Of Mice & Men. This is the band's first album to feature bassist and clean vocalist Aaron Pauley. It was released on January 24, 2014, in Europe and Australia, January 27, 2014, in Japan and the UK and January 28, 2014, in the US through Rise Records. It was produced by David Bendeth. A deluxe edition of the album, titled Restoring Force: Full Circle, was released on February 20, 2015. It featured four bonus tracks, including three new songs and an acoustic version of "Feels Like Forever".

== Background and recording ==
The album was announced through numerous publications in late November 2013. The album was produced by David Bendeth. The album's official track listing was revealed alongside the album's announcement. The album itself was completed in October 2013.

"You're Not Alone" was the first song to be released from the album, premiering on December 1, 2013, followed by "Bones Exposed" which premiered on December 23, 2013. While "Bones Exposed" is technically the second single from the album, it did not receive an official release. "Would You Still Be There" and "Feels Like Forever" were the second and third singles from the album, released in May and October 2014 respectively, and the deluxe edition featured two of the three new tracks as singles, released in February: "Broken Generation" in the UK, and "Never Giving Up" elsewhere.

== Composition ==
=== Influences, style and themes ===
In an interview with Alternative Press, lead singer Austin Carlile stated that the overall sound of this album would be "more rock, or I guess a nu-metal sound you could say" and explained that their music would become a lot more structured, comparing it to bands such as Linkin Park, Limp Bizkit, Slipknot, and Chevelle. He went on to say that "I kind of wanted to touch on that and have our songs to have more of a rock and roll feel. Just in your face, angsty, here-it-is rock and roll."

On October 14, 2013, Rock Sound released an interview with Austin Carlile where he discussed the album. Carlile stated that the album will have a larger focus on the lyrics and the melodic aspects, like a "...fusion between Meshuggah and Nickelback". He also spoke about the vocals on the new album explaining that "...it's a whole new step in the evolution of my vocals. There's a really cool contrast between my voice and Aaron's voice, and I think we've made great use of that."

On October 17, 2013, Alternative Press released the first studio video and announced the completion of the band's third album. The band also posted this statement about the album; "Over the past few months, we've been in the studio writing & recording our third full length album with producer David Bendeth. We are excited to announce that after the most in-depth recording process we have ever experienced, the album has been completed & we can't WAIT for you to hear it! This is our most ambitious release to date & will be the first album with our newest member, Aaron Pauley. The dynamics in the band have never been stronger & we are so proud of the music we have created together. Keep your ears open for new music coming soon!."

The name "Restoring Force" is a reference to their last album The Flood. Frontman Austin Carlile explained "What happens after a disaster? What happens after 'The Flood'? You return to normal. You find balance again. That's what we felt like we were doing with this album. We wanted this record to bring equilibrium back to our band and music. We're letting everyone know what we're here to stay. We're 'Restoring Force'." The cover of the album, a sea shell, is a visual representation of the return to equilibrium. In an interview for Big Cheese magazine, drummer Valentino Arteaga explains "One of the main symbolic reasons for having the shell [on the artwork] came from the idea of the Restoring Force helping regain the balance in a human. The Cochlea, or inner ear, is the place where your equilibrium is maintained, and it is shaped like a shell."

The single "You're Not Alone" was given a similarity to Deftones by Artistdirect, praising its energy and the coordination between vocalists Austin Carlile and new singer Aaron Pauley, along with the riffs of the song "...striking an elegant balance between crashing heavy metal and careening hard rock."

== Release and promotion ==
The album was released on January 28, 2014, through Rise Records. After the album's release, the band embarked on a two-month tour with Bring Me the Horizon. The band also headlined in the UK in April 2014 with supporting bands Issues and Beartooth. Before its official release, the album was made available to stream online for fans to listen to on January 21, 2014.

Despite the album being completed in October 2013, it was chosen to be officially released in January 2014. In an interview with Austin Carlile, he stated that the reason for this was because "It's a good way to start the year and it gives us the whole year to really push on and tour, it'll be great feeling like we have the whole year ahead of us." The album was also promoted through a "bundle pack", where you can get the album along with other franchise, including a limited edition of a coloured LPs, making this the first album by the band to be released on vinyl disk.

In late 2014, it was announced that they would release a deluxe edition of the album called Restoring Force: Full Circle which would include three brand new songs along with an acoustic version of "Feels Like Forever".

== Critical reception ==
Professional ratings
Review scores
Source	Rating
AbsolutePunk	80%
Alternative Press	4/5 stars
Kerrang!	4/5 stars
Loudwire	4/5 stars
Metal Hammer	8/10
Rock Sound	8/10

Restoring Force received mostly positive reviews from critics, who complimented the different sound of the album. At Alternative Press, Phil Freeman rated the album four stars out of five, and noted that sometimes the album feels like a departure from its predecessor, but stated "if the bolder moves on Restoring Force turn out to be signs of the band's musical future, it could have an impact across the scene." Loudwire's Chad Childers stated that Pauley's vocals complimented Carlile's screams throughout the album, and also praised the decision to have David Bendeth as their producer as he challenged the band to re-evaluate their writing process. He went on to applaud the album's range of moods and sounds, going from the brutality of the 'Public Service Announcement' to the melodic side of the band of 'Space Enough to Grow'.

Several reviews have stated that the band's new direction, much like their statement, had gone towards a more nu metal approach. Rock Sound reviewer Andy Ritchie stated that album sounds as though it is a completely different band compared to their previous releases, however will divide their fanbase. The review went on to claim that the album's roots are "firmly embedded in turn-of-the-century nu metal," but later went on to say that it still contains some of the band's "textbook metalcore," and that it was a unique sound either way. AbsolutePunk also highly praised the band's new style, since their previous albums had been efforts to be "ninety percent of today's average band trying to make it the metalcore/post-hardcore/risecore scene." Furthermore, they were surprised that Carlile had changed his screams to a more nu metal style from his previous metalcore style, but again praised this highly.

The album was included at number 31 on Rock Sound's "Top 50 Albums of the Year" list. The album was included at number 32 on Kerrang!'s "The Top 50 Rock Albums Of 2014" list.

== Commercial performance ==
Restoring Force was predicted to have sold between 45,000 and 55,000 copies in its first week. It would end up selling 51,000 copies in its first week, debuting at number four on the US Billboard 200. The album is the band's highest-charting album, peaking at number one for the first time on the Independent Albums and Hard Rock album charts. It has sold 207,000 copies in the United States as of August 2016.

The album is also the band's first album to have charted on the UK Rock Chart, peaking at number 17, and also in the Australian Albums Chart, peaking at number 9.

== Track listing ==
All tracks written by Austin Carlile, Alan Ashby and Aaron Pauley.

No.	Title	Length
1.	"Public Service Announcement"	3:32
2.	"Feels Like Forever"	3:13
3.	"Bones Exposed"	4:15
4.	"Would You Still Be There"	3:12
5.	"Glass Hearts"	3:15
6.	"Another You"	3:45
7.	"Break Free"	3:29
8.	"You Make Me Sick"	3:21
9.	"Identity Disorder"	3:37
10.	"You're Not Alone"	3:21
11.	"Space Enough to Grow"	3:38
Total length:		38:37

Restoring Force: Full Circle bonus tracks
No.	Title	Length
12.	"Broken Generation"	3:41
13.	"Something to Hide"	3:30
14.	"Never Giving Up"	3:39
15.	"Feels Like Forever" (acoustic version)	3:11
Total length:		52:47

== Personnel ==
Of Mice & Men

- Austin Carlile – unclean vocals, additional clean vocals on tracks 2, 6, 9, 12, 13, and 15
- Alan Ashby – rhythm guitar
- Phil Manansala – lead guitar
- Aaron Pauley – bass, clean vocals, unclean vocals on tracks 1, 7, and 8
- Valentino Arteaga – drums, percussion

Additional personnel

- David Bendeth – production, mixing, arranging
- Steve Sarkissian – assistant engineering, drum technician
- Koby Nelson – assistant, digital editing
- Connor Appleton – assistant
- Mitch Milan – digital editing, engineering, guitar technician, programming
- Brian Robbins – digital editing, engineering, mixing engineering, programming
- Ted Jensen – mastering
- Of Mice & Men – art direction, arranging
- Ryan Clark – design, photography
- Jon Barmby – logo

== Charts ==
=== Weekly charts ===
Chart (2014)	Peak position
Top Canadian Albums (Billboard)	9
US Billboard 200	4
US Rock Albums	2
US Independent Albums	1
US Hard Rock Albums	1
UK Albums Chart	17
UK Rock Chart	2
Australian Albums Chart	9
New Zealand Albums Chart	36

=== Year-end charts ===
Chart (2014)	Position
US Billboard Rock Albums	47
US Billboard Hard Rock Albums	11
US Billboard Independent Albums	17
