= Love Don't Live Here =

Love Don't Live Here may refer to:

- "Love Don't Live Here" (Lady Antebellum song), a 2007 single by Lady Antebellum
- "Love Don't Live Here" (Bananarama song), a 2010 single by Bananarama
- "Love Don't Live Here", a 2008 song by Ladyhawke from Ladyhawke
- Love Don't Live Here (album), a 2016 album by Lionheart

== See also ==
- Love Don't Live Here Anymore (disambiguation)
