= Standing in the Dark (album) =

Studio album by Platinum Blonde
- Released: January 1984
- Studio: Metalworks, Mississauga, Ontario
- Genre: Pop rock; new wave
- Label: Columbia Records
- Producer: David Tickle

Platinum Blonde chronology
Platinum Blonde (1983)	Standing in the Dark (1984)	Alien Shores (1985)

Singles from Standing in the Dark
- 1. "Doesn't Really Matter" Released: January 1983; 2. "Standing in the Dark" Released: April 1983; 3. "Not In Love" Released: October 1984; 4. "Take It From Me" Released: 1985

Professional ratings
Review scores
Source	Rating
Allmusic	3/5 stars

Standing in the Dark is the debut studio album by Platinum Blonde. Released by Columbia/CBS Records Canada in January 1984, it expanded on the band's original six-track EP. With the addition of four new tracks ("Standing in the Dark", "Sad Sad Rain", "Cast A Shadow", and "Leaders In Danger"), the album garnered the band their first taste of attention after going triple platinum in Canada. It was number 15 for 4 weeks on the Canadian RPM charts. It was on the charts for 43 weeks.

Two of the music videos for this album, "Standing in the Dark" and "Doesn't Really Matter", were nominated for Juno Awards for Video of the Year in 1984.

The album spawned four singles: "It Doesn't Really Matter," "Standing In The Dark," "Not In Love" and "Take It From Me". "Not In Love" was covered by Toronto-synth duo Crystal Castles, who are friends of lead Blonde Mark Holmes.

== Track listing ==
Side one
No.	Title	Writer(s)	Length
1.	"Doesn't Really Matter"	Mark Holmes, Sergio Galli	4:05
2.	"Standing In The Dark"	Holmes	3:19
3.	"Sad Sad Rain"	Holmes, Galli	3:50
4.	"Take It From Me"	Holmes, Galli	4:01
5.	"Cast A Shadow"	Holmes	3:40

Side two
No.	Title	Writer(s)	Length
6.	"Leaders In Danger"	Holmes	4:19
7.	"Not In Love"	Holmes, Galli	4:07
8.	"Video Disease"	Holmes	3:46
9.	"All Fall Down"	Holmes	4:15
10.	"Cinderella Story"	Galli	1:54

== Credits ==
Platinum Blonde:

- Sergio Galli – guitar, backing vocals
- Mark Holmes – lead vocals, bass, keyboards
- Chis Steffler – drums, percussion

with "assisting musicians":

- Bruce Barrow – bass
- Claude Desjardins – keyboards, drums, percussion
- Steve Sexton – keyboards
- Jo-Anne Bates – backing vocal

The instruments these musicians played are not noted on the actual album package, but Barrow is normally a bassist, Desjardins a drummer/keyboardist, and Sexton a keyboard player.

Engineer:

- David Tickle, assisted by Hugh Cooper
