= Inwire =

Studio album by Sven Gali
- Released: September 26, 1995
- Recorded: 1993–1995
- Studio: RCA
- Genre: Hard rock; grunge
- Length: 48:22
- Label: RCA
- Producer: Kelly Gray

Sven Gali chronology
Sven Gali (1992)	Inwire (1995)	3 (2020)

Singles from Inwire
- 1. "Keeps Me down" Released: 1995; 2. "What You Give" Released: May 13, 1995; 3. "Tired of Listening" Released: 1995

Inwire is the second album by Canadian rock band Sven Gali, released on September 26, 1995 through RCA in America and BMG Canada in Canada. It was recorded at Metalworks Studios in Mississauga, London Bridge Studios in Seattle as well as Robert Lang Studios (also in Seattle).

== Recording ==
The album features guest appearances by Christopher Thorn of Blind Melon on the song Tired of Listening and Who Said? and both Kevin Martin and Scott Mercado of Candlebox; both on the song Worms as well as Scott Mercado additionally performing on the song Helen.

== Reception ==
While the album was praised by music critics as evidence of the band's maturity into song writing and lyrics, many fans of the first album shunned the move in the group's musical directions; viewing it as an effort to maintain popularity rather than stay true to their real, core sound.

Professional ratings
Review scores
Source	Rating
AllMusic	4/5 stars

== Track listing ==
No.	Title	Length
1.	"What You Give"	3:51
2.	"Keeps Me Down"	4:23
3.	"Worms"	3:21
4.	"Make Me"	5:46
5.	"Red Moon"	4:36
6.	"Tired of Listening"	5:42
7.	"Shallow"	4:36
8.	"Truth"	3:32
9.	"Rocking Chair"	4:34
10.	"Helen"	4:30
11.	"Who Said?"	3:32
Total length:		48:22
