= Larisa Stow & Shakti Tribe =

American musical group

- Also known as: Larisa Stow and Shakti Tribe
- Origin: Long Beach, California
- Genres: New age, world, pop rock
- Years active: 2005-present
- Members: Larisa Stow; Benj Clarke; Richard Hardy; Bethany Grace Folsom
- Website: www.larisastow.com

Larisa Stow & Shakti Tribe is an American new age and pop-rock band from Long Beach, California that fuses Western and Eastern music with English and Sanskrit mantra.

== Career ==
Larisa Stow started in the pop-rock music scene in the late 1990s. In 1999, she released the album Moment by Moment, which was produced by David Tickle. She won the Los Angeles Music Award for Singer/Songwriter of the Year.

For her second album Reaching In, Stow worked with producer Richard Hahn. Reaching In features kirtans (Indian call-and-response chanting) blended with western music. It was released in 2005, and re-released by Oreade Music in 2007. In 2011, Larisa Stow & Shakti Tribe released Rock On Sat Nam!.

== Shakti Tribe Foundation ==
In 2007, the band began performing concerts for inmates inside prisons and jails, teaching the concepts of oneness, community, and self-love. The Shakti Tribe Peace Outreach Program was created to facilitate these prison events which is sponsored by the International Humanities Center, a nonprofit organization under Section 501(c)(3) of the IRS Code. They perform peace concerts and hold workshops in prisons, jails, recovery centers and juvenile systems. They also developed leadership and added inspirational speakers to their programs.

== Members ==
In 2004, Larisa Stow & Gathering Guru was formed. The members were David Del Grosso on bass, Kimo Estores on guitar, Marti Walker on backing vocals, Christo Pellani on drums, and Onyay Pheori on violin and vocals. Pellani left the group in 2005, and Walker took over the role of percussion, playing seated on cajon & djembe while singing. In 2006, Del Grosso left the band due to health issues, and was replaced on bass by Cincinnati Ohio native Benj Clarke.

In the summer of 2006, the band changed its name to Larisa Stow & Shakti Tribe. Pheori left the band in early 2007 and was replaced by woodwind player Richard Hardy. Walker left the band at the beginning of 2010 to pursue her own musical path, but stayed on board to sing backing vocals on the album Rock On Sat Nam. Clarke took over the harmony vocals, and the band performed with numerous drummers, and even used the computer program Ableton for a "drummer" on numerous live performances. Drummer Paloma Estevez, daughter of actor Emilio Estevez joined in the summer of 2011. Estevez left the group in 2012 and was replaced by Keith Larsen until her return to the band in early 2015. In 2013, guitarist Estores left after ten years in the group. After several replacement guitar players, guitarist Gabriel Ambrosius joined as a permanent member in 2017.

The current line-up features

- Larisa Stow - lead vocals, harmonium
- Benjamin "Benj" Clarke - bass, vocals, loop station
- Gabriel Ambrosius - guitar
- Richard Hardy - saxophone, flutes, and wind instruments. Hardy was a member of American songwriting legend Carole King's band for 14 years, and has also played with Dave Matthews Band, Stevie Ray Vaughan, and Lyle Lovett.
- Beth "Bethany Grace" Folsom - violin She has recorded and toured with Yanni, Los Angeles Philharmonic, and the San Diego Symphony. Bethany also performs with the Hutchins Consort, an octet that performs on the unique violins created by American luthier Carleen Hutchins
- Melissa Robin - backing vocals

=== Supporting musicians, live or in studio ===
The band's musician friends have joined in recordings and performances.

- Walfredo Reyes Jr - drums
- Victor Bisetti - drums and recordings
- David Garfield - piano
- Benjy Wertheimer - esraj
- Patrick Richey - tablas
- Paull E. Rubin - slide guitar
- Alan Morse - guitars

== Discography ==
=== Albums as Larisa Stow & Shakti Tribe ===
- Reaching In (2005) - as Larisa Stow & Gathering Guru, re-released 2007 as Larisa Stow & Shakti Tribe
- The Shakti Sessions (2007)
- Rock On Sat Nam! (2011)
- There Is A Light That Will Remain (2019)

=== Larisa Stow Solo Albums ===
- Moment By Moment (1999)
- Reaching Out (2007)

=== Collaborations ===
- Dance Chants - remix with Studio Voodoo, featuring Stow

=== DVD ===
- Prema Shakti Yoga

=== Singles ===
- Amba Amba (2007)
- O Holy Night (2012)
- Chamundayei (2019)
- Let Your Love Flow (2021)
- Just Breathe In (2022)
