= David Tickle =

British record producer and engineer (born 1959)

David Tickle (born 6 September 1959) is a British record producer and engineer. As a producer, he is noted for his work with Split Enz, and in Canada, for his mid-1980s work with Red Rider, Platinum Blonde and Gowan. He later produced Joe Cocker, The Divinyls "I Touch Myself", and was signed to produce the international hit for 4 Non Blondes "What's Up?". As an engineer or mixer, Tickle worked on best-selling albums by Blondie and U2. As a mixing engineer, he worked on several hit 1980s releases by Prince.

== Early career ==
Tickle was born on 6 September 1959 in Guildford, Surrey, the only son of a university professor father and an artistic mother. By his own account, he was mixing Red Buddha concerts at the age of 16, and mixed three singles for pop-rock quartet Liverpool Express, which achieved modest success on the UK Singles Chart in 1976 and 1977.

Through a friend he was introduced to New Zealand band Split Enz and laid down some tracks with them in a Manchester studio in early 1978.

He was hired soon after by Terry Melcher for a job at Ringo Starr's Ring O' Records label, and appointed the in-house engineer for the label's newly-acquired recording facility, Startling Studios, at Tittenhurst Park, John Lennon's former house and studio near Ascot, Berkshire. Tickle helped convert the studio from 16- to 24-track and lived on-site, later telling one interviewer "It was a great mansion, an 82-acre house, I was the only one to live there full time. I lived like a lord. Cooks, maids, the whole thing".

At Startling Studios, Tickle produced a further session with Split Enz, recording "I See Red", a punk-influenced single that became a hit in Australia and New Zealand. Although the band was keen to have Tickle produce their third album, Frenzy, they were overruled by their Australian management, who wanted a more experienced producer, and American Mallory Earl was drafted in. The band always regretted the decision, sensing Earl's work had failed to reach the levels of intensity and creativity their earlier sessions with Tickle had achieved.

== Mike Chapman ==
In 1978, Tickle responded to an advertisement offering work for "the best engineer in England, money no object". The ad had been placed by noted producer Mike Chapman, whose run of hits in Britain was almost over and who was by now working in New York with Blondie on their breakthrough Parallel Lines album.

Tickle was hired as a trainee producer and contributed mixing and engineering duties to Chapman's first US hits: Blondie's "Heart of Glass", The Knack's "My Sharona" and Exile's "Kiss You All Over". The experience provided Tickle with even more skills as a pop/rock producer.

== Split Enz ==
In October 1979, Tickle reconvened with Split Enz, this time in Melbourne, Australia, to record what would become their breakthrough, multi-platinum album, True Colours, which included the single "I Got You". In the wake of their unsatisfying Frenzy album, the band was adamant their next record would be a Tickle production. As recording progressed and Tickle's strategy became clearer – creating more space in their sound over resolute drum tracks – the band became convinced the album would be a turning point. In his history of the band, Mike Chunn says:

Tickle's production had fostered a less frenetic, more layered and ordered musicality on the band; people who were new to the band or who had been unable to assimilate them previously found the space and economy much easier to digest. The hooks were now prominent, almost naked, and the sparser rhythm tracks allowed lyrics to be heard.

By mid-1980, Tickle was back in Melbourne to record a follow-up to True Colours.

This was a different situation to True Colours. The previous album was recorded by a band and producer both poised to crack their respective, mid-level reputations wide open and that is exactly what happened. And while Split Enz, then in their late twenties and quite ready for huge success, had absorbed the attention and heady acclaim in an orderly fashion.

According to the radio documentary Enzology, Tickle particularly clashed heads with Tim Finn. In an interview for the program, Tickle said that in the wake of "I Got You"'s success, Finn sought greater involvement in the engineering process.

== Early to mid-1980s ==
After producing their next album, Waiata, he never worked with Split Enz again, though he did produce the Practical Jokers album for The Swingers, the band formed by Split Enz co-founder Phil Judd. (Judd, however, was not a member of Split Enz while Tickle was their producer.) The Swingers' album included the major Australian/New Zealand hit single "Counting The Beat".

In 1981, Tickle was hired by the Stiff label to remix the single "Is Vic There?" by London new wave cult band Department S. He produced a fatter, slicker pop sound.

David Tickle really didn't understand where we were coming from. He'd lived in America during the London punk explosion. I tried to do everything in one take, with as few over dubs as possible. We'd be sitting eating lunch in the community kitchen and he and the producer would be extolling the virtues of The Dark Side of the Moon and we'd be talking about Kraftwerk and The Sex Pistols. He really didn't get it. But that said, it could have come out a lot worse. We just kept the overdubs to a minimum.

Later in the 1980s, Tickle produced hit singles and albums for several Canadian acts. Production credits during this era include Canadian and US chart hits by Red Rider (including "Human Race"), the first album by Platinum Blonde, which featured the Canadian hit singles "Doesn't Really Matter" and "Not In Love", and two albums by Gowan, which featured his Canadian top-10 hits "A Criminal Mind" and "Moonlight Desires" and "Strange Animal".

During that same era, Tickle began a long-running working relationship with Prince, for whom he would work as engineer and mixing engineer, co-producing portions of six albums, and as live sound engineer on Prince's "Purple Rain" tour.

- We'd start with the drum machine and I wouldn't leave the studio until it was mixed. That could be 24, 48 hours, and on a couple of occasions we got into about 72, 76 hours. - David Tickle

Tickle was also involved in the recording of the new material. He worked front-of-house sound for the Purple Rain tour and mixed some of the singles taken from the soundtrack. As with Susan Rogers, that was the first time he had been involved in a Prince album from its inception.

Tickle said there was "no clear objective" for the album at the outset. Prince wrote "a song a day", and roughly every three days they would undertake a full production, usually after a show or during a few days off. Sessions began with a drum machine, and Tickle stayed until the track was mixed: typically 24 to 48 hours, and occasionally 72 to 76, without sleep. In his words, "You go in, you start it, and you don't leave until it's done." He said this accounts for the differences in production and sound between songs, and that some of the recordings are "raggedy" compared with the "very pristinely recorded" releases of the period.

“Some of it is raggedy,” said Tickle. “It doesn’t sound like it was done super high end in a studio, particularly at that time, when a lot of stuff was very pristinely recorded. That’s why everything is so unique. We’d go in, do a song and once it was done, we’d leave it.”

“They had more input,” agrees David Tickle. “Prince would put down a drum machine, do some kind of guide vocal, because he may not have figured out all of his vocal moves yet, then say to Wendy and Lisa, ‘Hey, you go and put background vocals on this’ and we'd build the thing up for him.”

== Relationship with Crowded House ==
Despite the problems with Split Enz, Neil Finn made tentative plans to use Tickle again, this time as an engineer, on the first Crowded House album, which began recording in 1985. Ultimately, the album was produced by Mitchell Froom at a studio selected by Tickle, with Tickle slated to receive a higher payment than Froom in recognition of his experience. No fewer than five engineers were used on the album, but Tickle himself was not one of them. He did not engineer any of the finished album, and his name does not appear in the album credits or the extensive "thanks to" section.

== Later work ==
Tickle continued to work as a producer during the late 1980s and 1990s, with credits on albums by Joan Armatrading, Belinda Carlisle, Toni Childs, and Joe Cocker among others. He was producer of the Divinyls' hit 1991 single "I Touch Myself".

Tickle is credited with producing the 4 Non Blondes 1993 debut album, including the hit song "What's Up?", but Linda Perry has since spoken about rejecting Tickle's work on the track and re-recording it, taking over production on it herself.

Tickle engineered all the studio tracks of the best-selling U2 album Rattle and Hum (1988), and mixed The Police's archival 1995 album Live!.

David is married to well-known model, actress, and bassist Kate Elizabeth Tickle and they have two sons Jaxon and Daniel. They reside in England and Los Angeles.

== Recent work ==
In 2000, Tickle built the 120-track Avalon Studios at Kauaʻi, Hawaii, where he mixed many 5.1 surround DTS records notably The Police's Greatest Hits album, Sting's ...Nothing Like the Sun and Ten Summoner's Tales, Sheryl Crow's album The Globe Sessions, and John Hiatt's album Bring the Family.

== Productions ==
Albums produced by David Tickle include:

- 4 Non Blondes: Bigger, Better, Faster, More! (1992)
- Adam Ant: Wonderful (1995)
- Joan Armatrading: What's Inside (1995)
- Barney Bentall and the Legendary Hearts: Barney Bentall and the Legendary Hearts (1988)
- Belinda Carlisle: A Woman and a Man (1996)
- Toni Childs: Union (1988)
- Joe Cocker: Night Calls (1991)
- Eric Johnson: Tones (1986)
- Gowan: Strange Animal (1985), Great Dirty World (1987)
- Platinum Blonde: Standing in the Dark (1983)
- Red Rider: Neruda (1983), Breaking Curfew (1984)
- Ellen Shipley: Breaking Through the Ice Age, (1980)
- Split Enz: True Colours (1980), Waiata (1981)
- Larisa Stow: Moment by Moment (1999)
- The Swingers: Practical Jokers (1981)
- Tito & Tarantula: "Strange Face (of Love)" from Tarantism (1997)
- El Último de la Fila: Astronomía razonable (1993)
