= Destine =

Dutch rock band

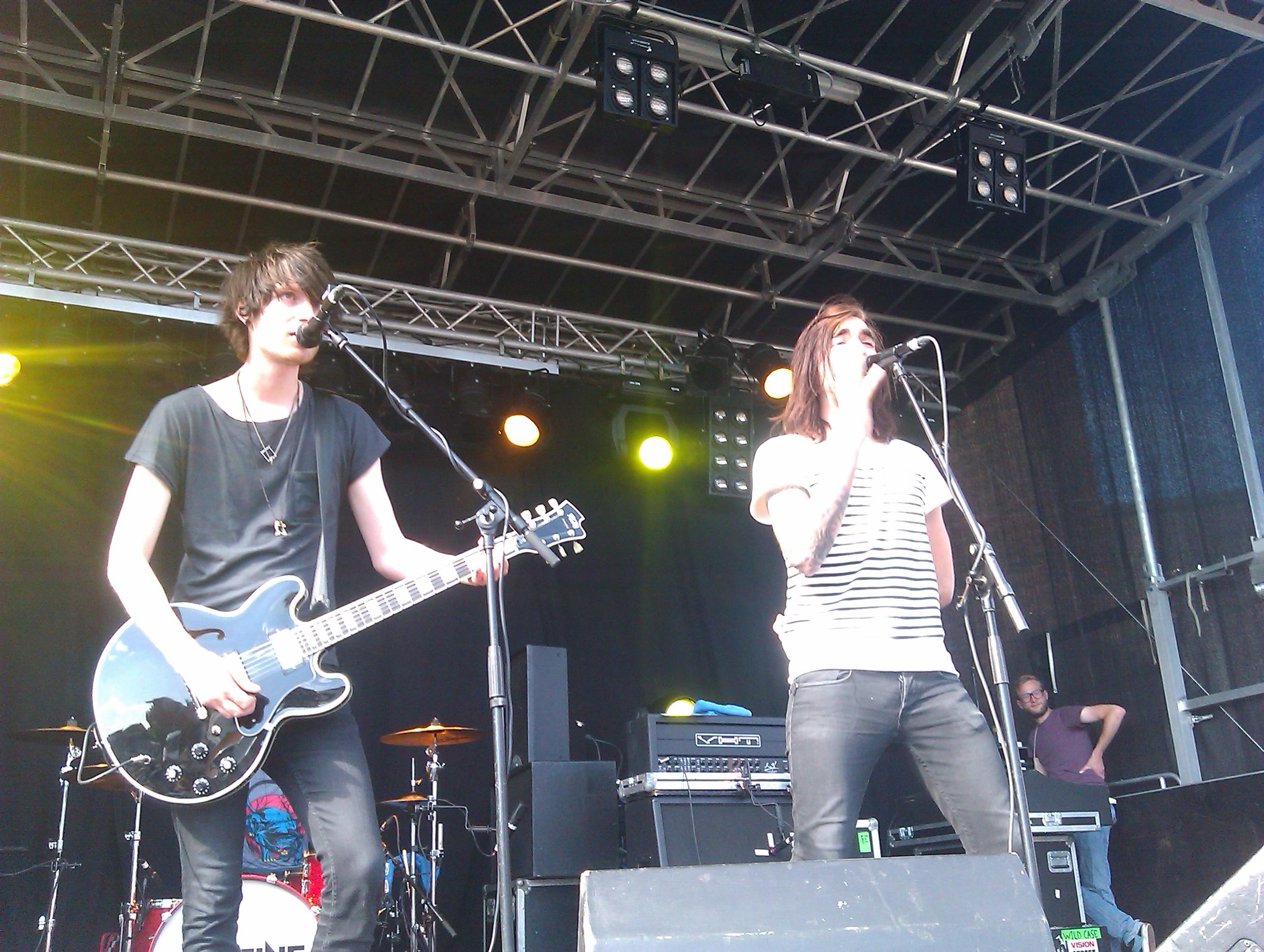
- Destine at a concert (2012)

Background information
- Origin: Tilburg, Netherlands
- Genres: Pop punk; power pop; alternative rock; emo
- Years active: 2006-2015
- Labels: Rude Records, Sony Music
- Members: Robin van Loenen; Hubrecht Eversdijk; Laurens Troost; Tom Vorstius Kruijff; Jordy Datema
- Website: http://www.destinemusic.com

Destine was a Dutch rock band that formed in Tilburg, the Netherlands in 2006.

== History ==
Originally from the Netherlands, the five youngsters joined forces in 2006 and released the A Dozen Dreams EP. After that, a time of intensive touring followed: in the first year they played 70 shows in the Netherlands, England, Wales, Germany, France and Belgium. Destine also shared the stage with bands like New Found Glory and Fall Out Boy. The large number of shows resulted in a rapidly growing fan base and several songs getting airplay on national radio and TV. Their song "Last Scene of a Plane Crash" was featured as a leader tune on TV station Comedy Central.

In December 2008, Destine signed with record label Sony Music and traveled to Orlando, Florida to record with producer James Paul Wisner, who has worked with bands such as Paramore and New Found Glory. He was impressed by the songs and was convinced that the band has the potential of achieving international success.

The first result of the collaboration, single "In Your Arms", entered Holland's charts in the first week of release, and soon received frequent airplay on several national radio stations. The single has been supported by a highly rewarded video, shot near San Francisco by director Marco de la Torre. In its first weeks, the video hit several YouTube charts. The song was also used for a commercial on Holland's largest TV station. Destine was featured on the cover of Up Magazine. The song was also featured in the video game Pro Evolution Soccer 2011.

In summer 2009, Destine toured frequently in the Netherlands and abroad. One of the highlights was the Lowlands Festival, one of Holland's major outdoor festivals. In September 2009 Destine returned to the US to record their debut full length, again with Wisner. The album was released in early 2010 by Sony Music.

On 17 April, a new music video was released for Spiders.

On 23 April, Destine announced via their website that they were flying to Orlando, Florida to record a new single, again being produced by James Paul Wisner. Recording was between 27 April and 3 May, and the result was a cover of the song "Down" by Jay Sean and Lil Wayne.

Single "Stay" was released on June 19, 2011. On August 3, the band's debut album was released for the first time in Japan including three bonus tracks, the cover song "Down", the remixed and remastered "The Disappointment" (taken from their debut EP) and the Night Skies, the only song written during the Lightspeed recording session that didn't make it to the final cut of the album as the band didn't think it fit the rest of the album as a whole.

Destine performed in August on the Netherlands radio station FN "Wait Forever" for the first time, along with several cover songs, the Japan bonus tracks for Lightspeed and "Stay". They also announced that the album will be released in mid-2012. On September 30 the band will release their next single "Thousand Miles" as well as the music video.

On October 18, 2011, the band announced that drummer Robin Faas quit. They also announced that Jordy Datema will take his place in the band. On October 20 Destine has played its last show with Robin Faas in Breda at the Breda zegt Ja festival.

On March 5, 2012, the band released their movie, Footprints: A Year in the Life.

On March 30, the band released their second studio album, "Illuminate". The album received many positive reviews and was on the Netherlands Chart, where they ranked 42 on April 7. The band recorded the album with James Paul Wisner again, and also with David Bendeth, who had worked with bands like All Time Low and Paramore, and mixed a few songs in this album.

Some months after they released their third album, they announced farewell shows which marks the end of this band.

== Influences ==
Lead vocalist Robin van Loenen stated in an interview:

From when we grew up we always listened mostly to American music and watched American movies and stuff. When we started playing in bands it was only natural to play that kind of music because that's what we loved. Some of my personal musical influences are Acceptance, Jimmy Eat World, Paramore and Copeland, as well as some metal, pop and oldies.

— Robin van Loenen, Substream Music Press

== Members ==
=== Current ===
- Robin van Loenen - lead vocals, rhythm guitar
- Hubrecht Eversdijk - lead guitar, backing vocals
- Laurens Troost - keyboards, synthesizers, backing vocals
- Tom Vorstius Kruijff - bass guitar, backing vocals
- Jordy Datema - drums

=== Former ===
- Robin Faas - drums

== Discography ==
Destine discography
- Studio albums: 2
- Extended plays: 1
- Singles: 7
- Music videos: 4

=== Studio albums ===
Title	Release date	Label	Charts (NL)
A Dozen Dreams (EP)	2006	Independent	
Lightspeed	January 1, 2010	Sony Music	22
Illuminate	March 30, 2012	Rude Records	42
Forevermore	May 8, 2015	Destine Music	-

=== Singles ===
Release date	Title	Album	Charts (NL)
May 8, 2009	"In Your Arms"	Lightspeed	77
August 14, 2009	"Stars"	Lightspeed	76
January 15, 2010	"Spiders"	Lightspeed	62
October 1, 2010	"Down"	Lightspeed	78
June 16, 2011	"Stay"	Illuminate	—
September 30, 2011	"Thousand Miles"	Illuminate	—
March 6, 2012	"Night Skies"	Illuminate	—
June 1, 2012	"All the People"	Illuminate	—
July 9, 2012	"Wait Forever"	Illuminate	—
April 28, 2015	"Down And Out"	Forevermore	—

=== Music videos ===
Release date	Title	Album	Director
May 8, 2009	"In Your Arms"	Lightspeed	Marco De La Torre
September 3, 2009	"Stars"	Lightspeed	Marco De La Torre
April 17, 2010	"Spiders"	Lightspeed	Marco De La Torre
October 8, 2010	"Down"	Lightspeed	Greg Ephraim
June 24, 2011	"Stay"	Illuminate	Laurens Troost & Sitcom Soldiers
September 30, 2011	"Thousand Miles"	Illuminate	Laurens Troost
June 1, 2012	"All the People"	Illuminate	Laurens Troost
July 9, 2012	"Wait Forever"	Illuminate	Laurens Troost
May 6, 2015	"Down And Out"	Forevermore	Laurens Troost

== Usage ==
The song "In Your Arms" is used on the soundtrack of the football game Pro Evolution Soccer (2011).
