= Big Swing Face (Bruce Hornsby album) =

Studio album by Bruce Hornsby
- Released: June 25, 2002
- Studio: Electric Lady Studios (New York City, New York); Tossington Sound (Williamsburg, Virginia)
- Genre: Rock; Jazz
- Length: 46:08
- Label: RCA
- Producer: David Bendeth

Bruce Hornsby chronology
Here Come The Noise Makers (2000)	Big Swing Face (2002)	Halcyon Days (2004)

Professional ratings
Review scores
Source	Rating
Allmusic	3/5 stars

Big Swing Face is the seventh album by American singer and pianist Bruce Hornsby. It was Hornsby's first studio album with his touring band, the Noisemakers, and his last album for RCA Records.

The album was Hornsby's most experimental effort to date; the only album on which Hornsby barely plays any piano, it relied heavily on post-electronica beats, drum loops, Pro Tools editing, and dense synthesizer arrangements. The album also boasts a "stream-of-consciousness wordplay" of lyrics that are in many ways more eccentric and humorous than previous work.

The jazz fusion jam on "Cartoons & Candy" and the gesture towards Hornsby's jam band influence with Steve Kimock's extended guitar solo on "The Chill" highlighted some of the album's only familiar territory, and Hornsby cites the opening track, "Sticks and Stones," as his partial homage to Radiohead's "Everything in its Right Place."

Big Swing Face received mixed reviews, ranging from "a new and improved Bruce Hornsby" to feeling as if "someone else is singing", to the album being called one of the "strangest records of 2002". The album received little promotion from RCA Records, and sold poorly. Hornsby left RCA shortly afterward.

== Track listing ==
All songs by Bruce Hornsby, except where noted.

No.	Title	Writer(s)	Length
1.	"Sticks & Stones"		3:19
2.	"Cartoons & Candy"	Hornsby, McKinley Morganfield	3:52
3.	"The Chill"		4:06
4.	"Big Swing Face"		5:31
5.	"This Too Shall Pass"		4:56
6.	"Try Anything Once"	David Bendeth, Hornsby	3:33
7.	"Take Out the Trash"		4:54
8.	"The Good Life"		3:44
9.	"So Out"		3:13
10.	"No Home Training"	Floyd Hill, Hornsby	4:23
11.	"Place Under the Sun"		4:13

Japan bonus track
No.	Title	Length
12.	"Sticks & Stones" (Acoustic Version)	4:37

== Musicians ==
- Bruce Hornsby – vocals, keyboards
- J.T. Thomas – organ (10)
- David Bendeth – guitars, bass (3–7, 9, 11), drum fills (7, 10), organ (11)
- Doug Derryberry – guitars (3, 9, 11), backing vocals (5)
- Steve Kimock – guitar solos (3–5)
- J. V. Collier – bass (1, 2, 4, 8, 10, 11)
- Taso Kotsos – drum programming
- Michael Baker – drums (1–4, 8–10)
- Bonny Bonaparte – drums (3, 9, 10)
- Bobby Read – bass clarinet (7, 11)
- Wayne Pooley – additional talking (7)
- Jeff Juliano – additional talking (7)
- Joe Lee – backing vocals (9)
- Floyd Hill – backing vocals (10)

== Production ==
- David Bendeth – A&R, producer, engineer, mixing (1, 6, 11)
- Jeff Juliano – engineer, mixing (2–9)
- Wayne Pooley – engineer
- John Seymour – engineer, mixing (1, 11)
- Dagle – mixing (10)
- Arnold Geher – additional engineer
- John Adler – assistant engineer
- Ted Jensen – mastering at Sterling Sound (New York City, New York)
- Dave Gorrie – production coordinator
- Patti Martin – production manager
- FJH – art direction
- Sean Smith – photography
- Michael Miller – illustration
- Deep South Entertainment – management

Road crew

- Peter Banta
- Gary Crosniak
- Caldwell Gray
- Shane Owen
- Wayne Pooley
