= Alien Shores =

Studio album by Platinum Blonde
- Released: 1985
- Studio: Metalworks Studios, Mississauga, Ontario
- Genre: New wave
- Label: CBS Canada – 80105
- Producer: Eddy Offord, Mark Holmes

Platinum Blonde chronology
Standing in the Dark (1984)	Alien Shores (1985)	Contact (1987)

Singles from Alien Shores
- 1. "Crying Over You" Released: 1985; 2. "Situation Critical" Released: 1985; 3. "Somebody Somewhere" Released: 1986; 4. "Hungry Eyes" Released: 1986

Professional ratings
Review scores
Source	Rating
Allmusic	4.5/5 stars

Alien Shores is the second studio album by Platinum Blonde Released by Columbia/CBS Records Canada in 1985, it contained one of the band's biggest Canadian hits with "Crying Over You" and their only US hit, "Somebody Somewhere". The album reached a high of 3 for 4 weeks on the Canadian charts.

This album was the first to feature Kenny MacLean as a full-time bassist and keyboardist. This freed lead singer Mark Holmes to focus on lead vocal duties.

The band enlisted Alex Lifeson from fellow Canadian rockers Rush to perform guitar solos on two songs on the album, "Crying Over You" and "Holy Water". Coincidentally, a song entitled "Alien Shore" is the sixth track on Rush's 1993 album Counterparts.

The album was released as a mini-concept album with the b-side (starting with "Lost in Space") containing various songs with a science fiction theme and narrative.

== Track listing ==
Side 1

1. "Situation Critical" (Mark Holmes) – 3:31
2. "Crying Over You" (Holmes) – 3:39
3. "Red Light" (Holmes, Sergio Galli) – 2:50
4. "It Ain't Love Anyway" (Holmes) – 3:12
5. "Somebody Somewhere" (Holmes) – 4:06

Side 2

6. "Lost In Space" (Holmes, Galli) – 4:04
7. "Temple of the Newborn" (Kenny MacLean) – 4:02
8. "Holy Water" (Holmes, MacLean) – 3:41
9. "Animal" (Holmes) – 4:31
10. "Hungry Eyes" (Holmes, Galli) – 4:38

== Credits ==
Platinum Blonde:

- Sergio Galli: guitar, backing vocals
- Mark Holmes: lead vocals
- Kenny MacLean: bass, keyboards, backing vocals
- Chis Steffler: drums, percussion

with "special guest musicians":

- Bruce Barrow
- Claude Desjardins
- Lou Pomanti
- Alex Lifeson: guitar solos on 2, 8
- Dalbello: backing vocals on 3, 7, 8
- Earl Seymour: saxophone solo on 5
- Randall Wyse: vocal chant on 7

It is not noted on the actual album package which specific instruments the first three listed musicians played, but Barrow is normally a bassist, Desjardins a drummer/keyboardist, and Pomanti a keyboard player/bassist.

Engineers:

- Eddy Offord, Ed Stone

Pre-production on 2, 6, 9:

- David Tyson
