= Platinum Blonde (band) =

Canadian rock band

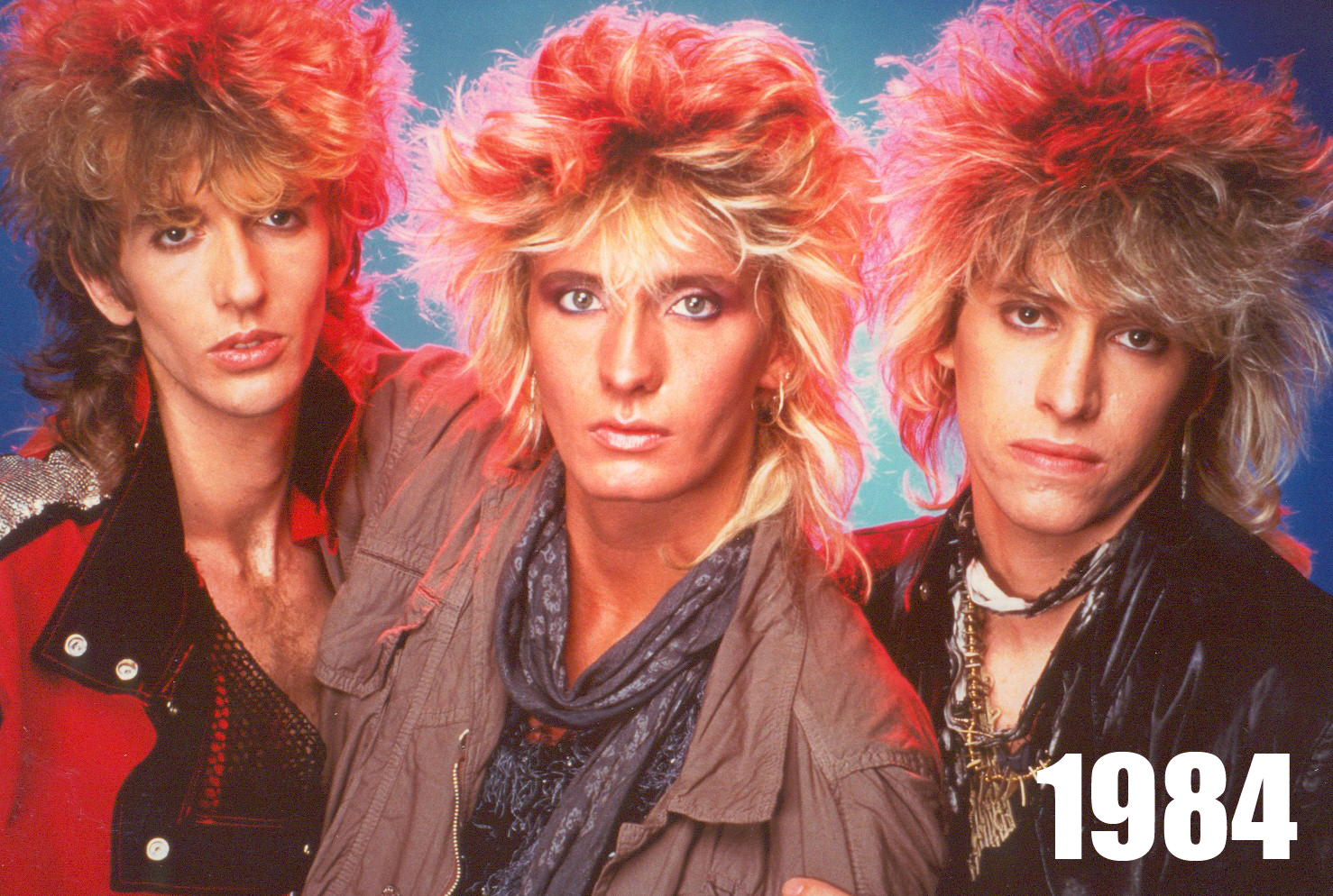
- Chris Steffler, Mark Holmes, Sergio Galli

Background information
- Also known as: The Blondes
- Origin: Toronto, Ontario, Canada
- Genres: Glam rock; pop rock; punk rock (early)
- Years active: 1979–1990, 2010–present
- Label: CBS Records SONY
- Members: Mark Holmes; Sergio Galli; Justin "Juice" Kadis
- Past members: Joey Ciotti; Ray Bailie; Chris Steffler; Kenny MacLean; Sascha Tukatsch; Daniel Todd; Rob Laidlaw; Dave Barrett
- Website: platinumblonde.com

Platinum Blonde, known briefly as The Blondes, is a Canadian rock band that formed in Toronto, Ontario, in 1979. Vocalist Mark Holmes has been the only consistent member of the band since its inception.

In his 2016 book Is This Live?: Inside the Wild Early Years of MuchMusic: The Nation's Music Station, Canadian songwriter and former MuchMusic VJ, Christopher Ward said of the band: "If ever there was a Canadian band that was tailor-made for the video era, it was Platinum Blonde."

The band was most prominent in the 1980s with singles such as "Standing in the Dark", "Not in Love", "Doesn't Really Matter", "Situation Critical", and "Crying Over You". In 1984, they were one of the top-selling Canadian bands in Canada, second only to Rush. At that time, the line-up consisted of Mark Holmes on lead vocals and bass, Sergio Galli on guitar, and Chris Steffler on drums. Scottish musician Kenny MacLean became the band's bassist and keyboardist in 1985.

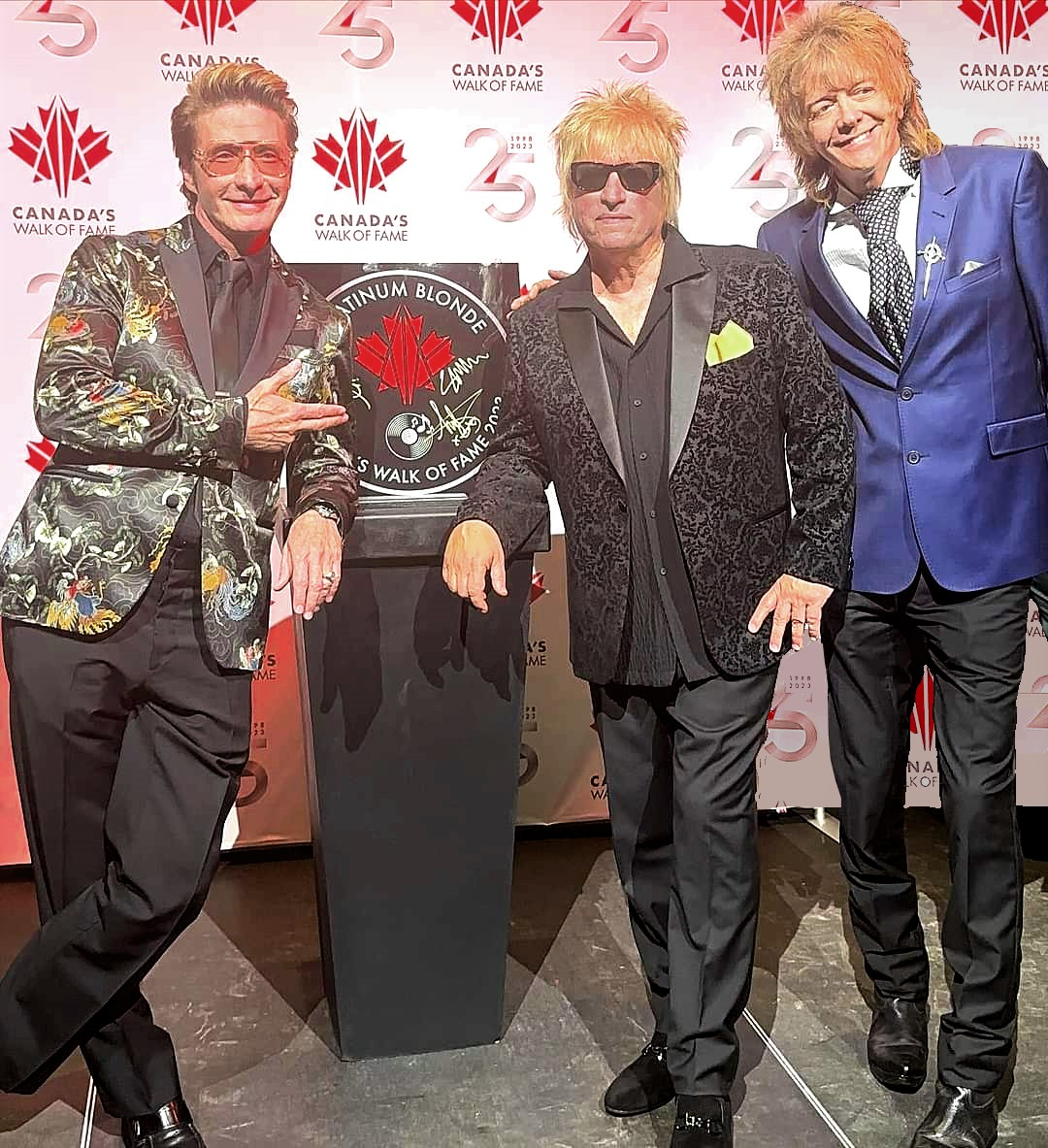
Canada's Walk Of Fame inductees Platinum Blonde Mark Holmes, Sergio Galli and Chris Steffler, Massey Hall Toronto, 2023.

The band broke up in 1989. Inspired by MacLean's frequent suggestions of a reunion over the years, Holmes, Galli and Steffler brought the band back together in 2010 (MacLean had died in 2008.) The band was inducted into the Canadian Music and Broadcast Industry Hall of Fame in 2010. On September 28, 2023, Platinum Blonde was inducted into Canada's Walk of Fame.

== History ==
Mark Holmes emigrated from Mansfield, England to Canada in 1977. He attended commercial art college, apprenticed in hairdressing and played in bands on the side. Platinum Blonde was initially formed in Toronto in 1979 as a punk and new wave band that consisted of Mark Holmes on vocals and guitar, Joey Ciotti on vocals and bass guitar, and Ray Bailie on drums. They played songs by such artists as Marc Bolan, Gary Glitter, and The Police. In 1980, they released a seven-inch single with the songs "Hey Hey You" and "No Regrets", but eventually disbanded.

In 1982, Holmes placed a want ad in a Toronto newspaper looking for new musicians to join the band. Drummer Chris Steffler and guitarist Sergio Galli answered the ad to meet the 19 year old Holmes. Steffler (b. 1957) had known Holmes from the music circles in the Toronto club scene while recording and playing with future bassist Kenny McLean in 1979. Galli (b. 1959/1960) was enrolled in the architecture program at the University of Toronto when he answered Holmes' ad.

The band recorded a seven track demo tape on a four-track recorder and sent it to British music producer David Tickle who liked their sound and flew to Toronto to work with them. The band signed to Epic Records Canada and Tickle produced their self-titled EP, which was released in 1983. Tickle also produced their debut, full-length album Standing in the Dark, which expanded upon the tracks from their EP and was released later that same year. Standing in the Dark sold over 200,000 copies in Canada, which was certified double platinum at the time. The band's videos for the singles "Standing in the Dark" and "Doesn't Really Matter" were directed by Rob Quartly and were both nominated for video of the year at the 1984 Juno Awards. The Canadian music cable network MuchMusic (later known as Much) also launched in 1984, further exposing their music to a wider audience.

While the band's lyrics were not particularly romantic ("Not In Love", for example, was quite the opposite), the band's look in combination with their music's catchy pop hooks attracted a fanbase that consisted heavily of teenage girls. The band held a free concert at Toronto's Nathan Phillips Square in 1983 that attracted a crowd of 25,000 screaming fans and resulted in 40 people being sent to hospital. By 1984, they were one of the top-selling Canadian bands in Canada, second only to Rush. The band toured across Canada on Bryan Adams' 1983 tour and on Billy Idol's Rebel Yell tour in 1984. They also played New York City's The Ritz with Dead or Alive in 1984.

Scottish musician Kenny MacLean joined the band in 1985, taking over the role of bassist from Holmes and also playing keyboards, and Platinum Blonde released their second album, Alien Shores. Produced by British producer Eddy Offord, the album was a departure from their first two releases and added elements of funk. Holmes said that the sound was greatly influenced by the Ohio Players. The five songs on the second half of the album were also written around the concept of extraterrestrials visiting Earth thousands of years ago, inspired by a theory posited by author Erich von Däniken in his novel Chariots of the Gods?. Rush guitarist Alex Lifeson also contributed a guitar solo. Singles from the album included "Situation Critical", "Crying Over You", "Somebody Somewhere", and "Hungry Eyes". "Crying Over You" marked the band's first #1 single and went gold. The video for "Crying Over You" won a Gemini Award for best music video and Alien Shores sold over 500,000 copies.

Steffler left the band in 1987 was replaced by drummer Alexander "Sascha" Tukatsch, who provided percussion for Platinum Blonde's 1988 album, Contact. Contact was a continuation of Platinum Blonde's evolving sound, which further incorporated elements of funk. Guests on the album include Ohio Players vocalist Leroy "Sugarfoot" Bonner and percussionist Tony Thompson, who played for Chic and the Power Station. The album also includes a remake of the Ohio Players hit single "Fire". That same year the band appeared as alien bikers in the episode "Eye for an Eye" of the sci-fi television series War of the Worlds, as well as in the episode "Mug Shot" on the Mr. T series T. and T.

While Contact was positively received by critics, and the title track was a modest hit in Canada, the album sold 150,000 and did not become the breakthrough into the US market that the band had hoped for. The band parted ways in 1989 and the following year Yeah Yeah Yeah was released under the band name The Blondes. MacLean, who also released a solo album that same year, told the Calgary Herald that he was "not proud of" Yeah Yeah Yeah and that it was produced out of "contractual obligation". In 1999, Holmes told Maclean's that drugs and poor business decisions played a role in the band's demise and told the Edmonton Journal that he had been involved in a four-year battle with Sony to regain the rights to his songs and get out of his contracts.

After the break-up, Galli created his own architectural design firm, called Belair Design. Steffler, who left the band two years prior, became a Toronto Entertainment District resto-bar owner with a venue called Twiggy from 1993 to 2000 named after the British modeling sensation Twiggy. MacLean continued to both play and record music professionally and released a second solo album in 1996. Having worked as a hairdresser prior to joining Platinum Blonde, MacLean returned to the profession from time to time to supplement his income. Holmes and Tukatsch formed a band called Vertigo in 1996, along with musician Dave Barrett, that later became known as No. 9. Described by C. J. O'Connor of the Toronto Star as "pre-inflatable-pig Pink Floyd, powered by Marshall/clothed by Galliano," the band's sound was inspired by the music of the late 1960–early 1970 London rock scene. The band was not finding any labels to take them on, so Holmes began to organize once-monthly club events, called "Orange Alert" (based on the alert that sounded whenever penal colonists of the 1960s, British TV series, The Prisoner managed to make an escape.) Inspired by happenings of the 1960s, these club events parlayed into the establishment the Mod Club Theatre in 2002, which was co-founded by Holmes and where he would sometimes spin records under the moniker DJ MRK.

On November 21, 2008, MacLean held a CD release party at the Mod Club for his third solo album Completely. MacLean and Holmes also played some Platinum Blonde songs for the attendees. MacLean had been suggesting to Holmes for some time that the band get back together, but he died of a heart attack within hours of his performance at the Mod Club. MacLean's body was found in his apartment three days later.

In 2010, Holmes, Galli, and Steffler reunited and played their first Platinum Blonde reunion show at the Mod Club. Three days later the band was inducted into the Radio and Television Broadcasters Association Hall of Fame. Holmes' said during his acceptance speech: "We decided, because of Kenny, that we would get back together. It was great to play together the other night. We wish Kenny was there." That same year, the electronic duo Crystal Castles released a version of "Not in Love" featuring Robert Smith of The Cure on vocals. Steffler was unable to continue to play with the band after developing the auditory affliction tinnitus.

In June 2012, Platinum Blonde members Mark Holmes and Sergio Galli, along with drummer Dan Todd and bassist Rob Laidlaw released the album Now & Never. As of 2020, the band was reformed as a trio with Mark Holmes returning to playing bass, Sergio Galli returning on guitar, and Justin "Juice" Kadis on drums.

On September 28, 2023, Platinum Blonde was inducted into Canada's Walk of Fame at the Canada's Rock of Fame induction ceremony at Massey Hall.

== Musical and visual style ==
Platinum Blonde's early sound was a mix of new wave and pop rock, mixed with heavier, arena rock-style guitar. Their highly financed videos and fashion conscious look, along with Holmes's British accent-inflected vocals, drew comparisons to Duran Duran. Their early covers of songs by The Police, along with their spiky blonde hairstyles and fashion choices, caused comparisons with that band as well.

In 1984, Liam Lacey of The Globe and Mail said that the group sounded a lot like Loverboy trying to make a new wave credibility move. In 1987, Bruno Fracassa of Newsday said, "Lead singer, Mark Holmes, sounds like Simon Le Bon from Duran Duran. Overall, I think they would be happy just being a northern version of Bon Jovi." In his 2016 book, Is This Live?: Inside the Wild Early Years of MuchMusic: The Nation's Music Station, songwriter and MuchMusic VJ Christopher Ward described their sound as "deftly mixing strains of Elvis Costello, The Police and Tears for Fears with big sing-along choruses."

Throughout the 1980s, the entire band had long blond hair, often spiky, teased or tousled. The band commonly wore suit jackets and some band members wore make up. In their early videos they were portrayed with an aloof demeanor. The band's look and attitude was described by the press as "pretty", "glamorous", "cocky", and "androgynous".

In 1985, Liam Lacey of The Globe and Mail described the band's look as "sort of Duran Duran meets Rod Stewart" and Alan Niester, also of The Globe and Mail, said that same year, "the band managed to create its own fashion revolution, manufacturing a flashy, sophisticated Platinum Blonde 'look' that was copied by its fans across the country." Mike Devlin of the Times Colonist wrote in 1999: "The band's blonde, tousled manes inspired a legion of hairdo followers. Their Dayglo suits started a fashion revolution. Their arty videos helped shape the early image of MuchMusic."

Their esthetic was very popular with teenage girls, somewhat to the band's dismay. Holmes told the Ottawa Citizen in 1985, "We are often judged by the first three rows of screaming girls. They don't look beyond that to where the college students and our older fans are sitting. Being judged by our appearance and by people fainting often shatters what we are doing musically. It is painful for us sometimes." In a 1990 interview with the Calgary Herald, MacLean said "We were the New Kids on the Block of that period," and added "I still like the music, so I would never be embarrassed about being a teen idol."

== Band members ==
Current

- Mark Holmes – vocals (1979–1990, 2010–present), guitar (1979–1982) bass (1982–1984, 2014–present), keyboards (1982–1984)
- Sergio Galli – guitar (1982–1990, 2010–present)
- Justin Kadis – drums (2020–present)

Former

- Joey Ciotti – vocals, bass (1979–1981)
- Ray Bailie – drums (1979–1981)
- Chris Steffler – drums (1982–1987, 2010–2012)
- Kenny MacLean – bass, keyboards (1985–1990; died 2008)
- Sascha Tukatsch – drums (1987–1990)
- Rob Laidlaw – bass (2010–2013)
- Daniel Todd – drums (2012–2019)

Timeline

== Discography ==
=== Studio albums ===
- Standing in the Dark (1984)
- Alien Shores (1985)
- Contact (1987)
- Yeah Yeah Yeah (1990) (as The Blondes)
- Now & Never (2012)

=== Live albums ===
- Best of Live (1993)

=== Compilation albums ===
- Seven Year Itch: 1982–1989 (1999)
- Collections (2006)

=== Extended plays ===
- Platinum Blonde (1983)

=== Singles ===
Title	Release	Peak chart positions		Album
Title	Release	CAN	US	Album
"No Regrets"	1980	—	—	non-album single
"Doesn't Really Matter"	1983	31	—	Standing in the Dark
"Standing in the Dark"	1983	43	—	Standing in the Dark
"Sad Sad Rain"	1984	57	—	Standing in the Dark
"Not in Love"	1984	44	—	Standing in the Dark
"Take It from Me"	1985	—	—	Standing in the Dark
"Crying Over You"	1985	1	—	Alien Shores
"Situation Critical"	1985	8	—	Alien Shores
"Somebody Somewhere"	1986	23	82	Alien Shores
"Hungry Eyes"	1986	57	—	Alien Shores
"Father Christmas"	1986	—	—	non-album single
"Contact"	1987	13	—	Contact
"Connect Me"	1987	45	—	Contact
"Fire"	1988	49	—	Contact
"If You Go This Time"	1988	71	—	Contact
"Yeah Yeah Yeah" (as The Blondes)	1990	75	—	Yeah Yeah Yeah
"Beautiful"	2012	—	—	Now & Never
"Hi 2 B Lo"	2020	—	—	—
"—" denotes a recording that did not chart or was not released in that territory.

== See also ==
- Canadian rock
- Music of Canada
