= Varga (band) =

Canadian heavy metal band

- Origin: Hamilton, Ontario, Canada
- Genres: Heavy metal, thrash metal, progressive metal, groove metal, industrial metal
- Years active: 1989–1998, 2012–present
- Labels: Zoo Entertainment, BMG
- Members: Joe Varga; Dan Fila; Sean Williamson; Adam Alex
- Website: vargahq.com

Varga is a Canadian metal band formed in 1989. "Freeze Don't Move" and "Greed", from their Prototype album, were minor hits on MuchMusic throughout 1993. Dan Fila and Sean Williamson later joined Hypodust, an industrial metal band from Hamilton, Ontario. In 2012, Varga reformed and released two albums, Enter the Metal (2013) and Return of the Metal (2014).

== History ==
=== 1989–1992 ===
Varga was formed in Hamilton, Ontario in 1989. Their first independent cassette, Multiple Wargasms, was released in 1991, garnering positive reviews locally and internationally, featuring a progressive/thrash metal sound. In 1992, the band recorded a full-length album for New York independent label Maze America, but the label folded and the CD was never released.

=== 1993–1997 ===
Varga signed with Zoo/BMG in 1993, and released Prototype the following year, introducing industrial elements to their sound. The band was nominated for a Canadian Juno award for "Best Hard Rock Act", and was one of the first bands to perform live on MuchMusic's Power 30, and toured extensively in the U.S. and Canada. In the U.S., the band's video for "Greed" was picked up on Headbangers Ball, and was featured in an episode of Beavis and Butthead.

In 1995, the band released Oxygen, but with little support from the label and no hit songs, the band left BMG, but not before opening for White Zombie and Metallica.

=== 1998–2010 ===
After disbanding in 1998, the members continued to perform individually. From 2002 to 2008, Dan Fila and Sean Williamson joined industrial/metal band Hypodust. Fila, Williamson, and Joe Varga performed during this time in classic metal cover band SuperBlaster.

=== 2011–present ===
Through social media, the band reconnected with Adam Alex in 2011. The band entered the studio with producer Julius Butty (Alexisonfire, Protest the Hero).

== Personnel ==
- Joe Varga – bass and lead vocals
- Dan Fila – drums (see: Sven Gali)
- Sean Williamson – guitar
- Adam Alex – guitar

== Discography ==
=== Albums ===
- Multiple Wargasms (1991)
- Prototype (1994)
- Oxygen (1995)
- Enter the Metal (2013)
- Return of the Metal (2014)

=== Compilation appearances ===
- Raw M.E.A.T. 2 (1990)
