= Crying Over You =

Single by Platinum Blonde

from the album Alien Shores
- B-side: "It Ain't Love Anyway"
- Released: July 1985
- Genre: New wave
- Length: 3:35
- Label: CBS
- Songwriter: Mark Holmes
- Producers: Eddy Offord, Mark Holmes

Platinum Blonde singles chronology
"Take It From Me" (1985)	"Crying Over You" (1985)	"Situation Critical" (1985)

Music video
- "Crying Over You" on YouTube

Audio
- "Crying Over You" on YouTube

"Crying Over You" is a song by Canadian new wave group Platinum Blonde, released as the first single from their 1985 album Alien Shores. The single reached No. 1 on the Canadian record charts on Sept. 7, 1985. The song features a guitar solo by Alex Lifeson from Rush. A shorter edit of the 12" 'Radical Mix' version of the song appears as the 'B' side of their single 'Somebody Somewhere'.

== Track listing ==
7" single:

- A: "Crying Over You" - 3:35
- B: "It Ain't Love Anyway" - 3:08

12" single:

- A: "Crying Over You (Radical Mix)" - 6:04
- B1: "Crying Over You (Dub Version)" - 4:45
- B2: "Crying Over You (Instrabeat Mix)" - 4:30

Remixes and additional production by Shep Pettibone.

== Charts ==
Chart (1985)	Peak position
Canada Top Singles (RPM)	1
