= Mod Club =

Entertainment venue in Toronto, Ontario

The Mod Club
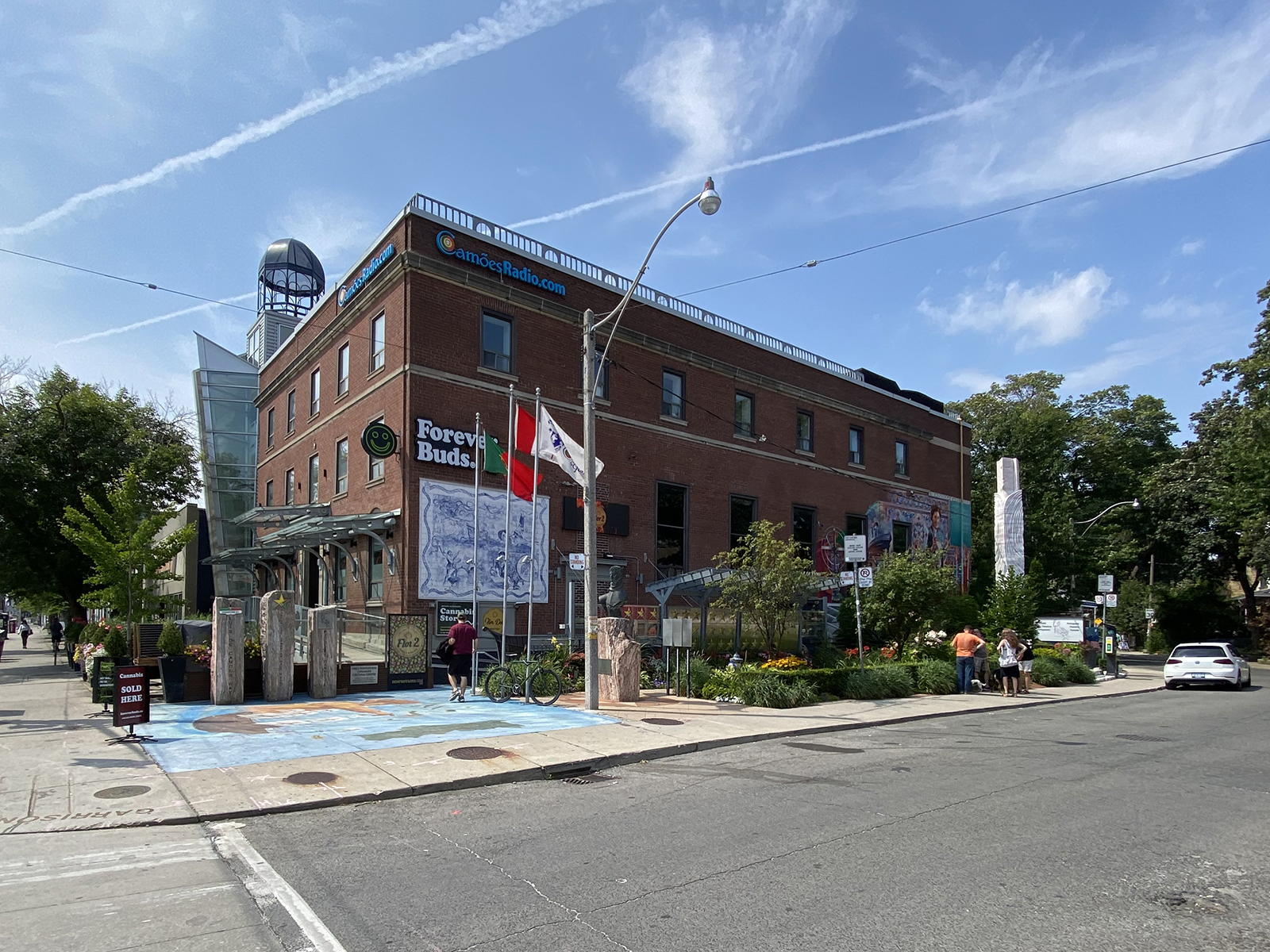
- The Axis Club in 2023
- Interactive map of The Mod Club
- Former names: The Virgin Mobile Mod Club; The Axis Club (2021–2025)
- Coordinates: 43.6554°N 79.4194°W
- Owner: Bruno Sinopoli
- Seating type: General admission (standing)
- Capacity: 618
- Type: Music hall

Construction
- Opened: 2002–2020; 2025–present

Website
- https://www.themodclub.com/

The Mod Club is an entertainment venue situated at 722 College Street, in Toronto's Little Italy neighbourhood.

The Mod Club operated from 2002 until the COVID-19 lockdowns in 2020. In late 2021, the venue reopened as The Axis Club, before being rebranded back to The Mod Club in May 2025.

== Overview ==
The Mod Club has a 600 person capacity and a stage that is 24 feet wide x 18 feet deep.

While functioning as The Mod Club, the interior was accented with murals featuring images of 1960s mod subculture and concert-goers could watch acts from the floor, the tables to the side of the room, or the second floor balcony It also featured two large video panels to give audience members views of the performers on stage.

In the transition to The Axis Club, some of these features were removed to increase capacity and the equipment was updated to facilitate live-streamed performances, including a multi-camera setup, as well as an LED wall. The interior also features music-themed murals from Toronto artist John Nobrega.

== Background ==
The Mod Club's theme was inspired by the late 1990s and early 2000s "Mod Club" club nights, held at several Toronto's Little Italy venues by former Platinum Blonde frontman Mark Holmes and fellow British immigrant Bobbi Guy who managed the Toronto record store Sam the Record Man.

In 1996, with Platinum Blonde inactive for a number of years already, Holmes, along with former Platinum Blonde drummer Sascha Tukatsch and musician Dave Barrett, launched a new musical act—band called Vertigo, later to become known as No. 9. Inspired by the late 1960s–early 1970s London rock scene, the band found no record label interest, so, in 1996, Holmes began to organize monthly club events under the "Orange Alert" moniker. Visually and sonically focused around 1960s British nostalgia, the events got their name from the alert that sounded whenever penal colonists attempted an escape on the 1960s British TV series The Prisoner.

By 1999, attracting consistent crowds, the events were rebranded as "Mod Club" nights and bumped up to weekly frequency, Thursdays at Lava Lounge, a nightclub on College Street. As their popularity kept increasing, Mod Club events added Saturdays at the nightclub Revival, another College Street venue located in a former Baptist church. Attendees of these club nights dressed in mod-inspired fashions. Mod Club nights incorporated R&B, funk and soul music from the 1960s, music from the mod revival scenes of the 1970s and 1980s as well as 1990s Britpop.

Looking for a larger venue, Mark Holmes approached Bruno Sinopoli about coming on board and converting The Corner Pocket pool hall into a nightclub venue together.

== History ==
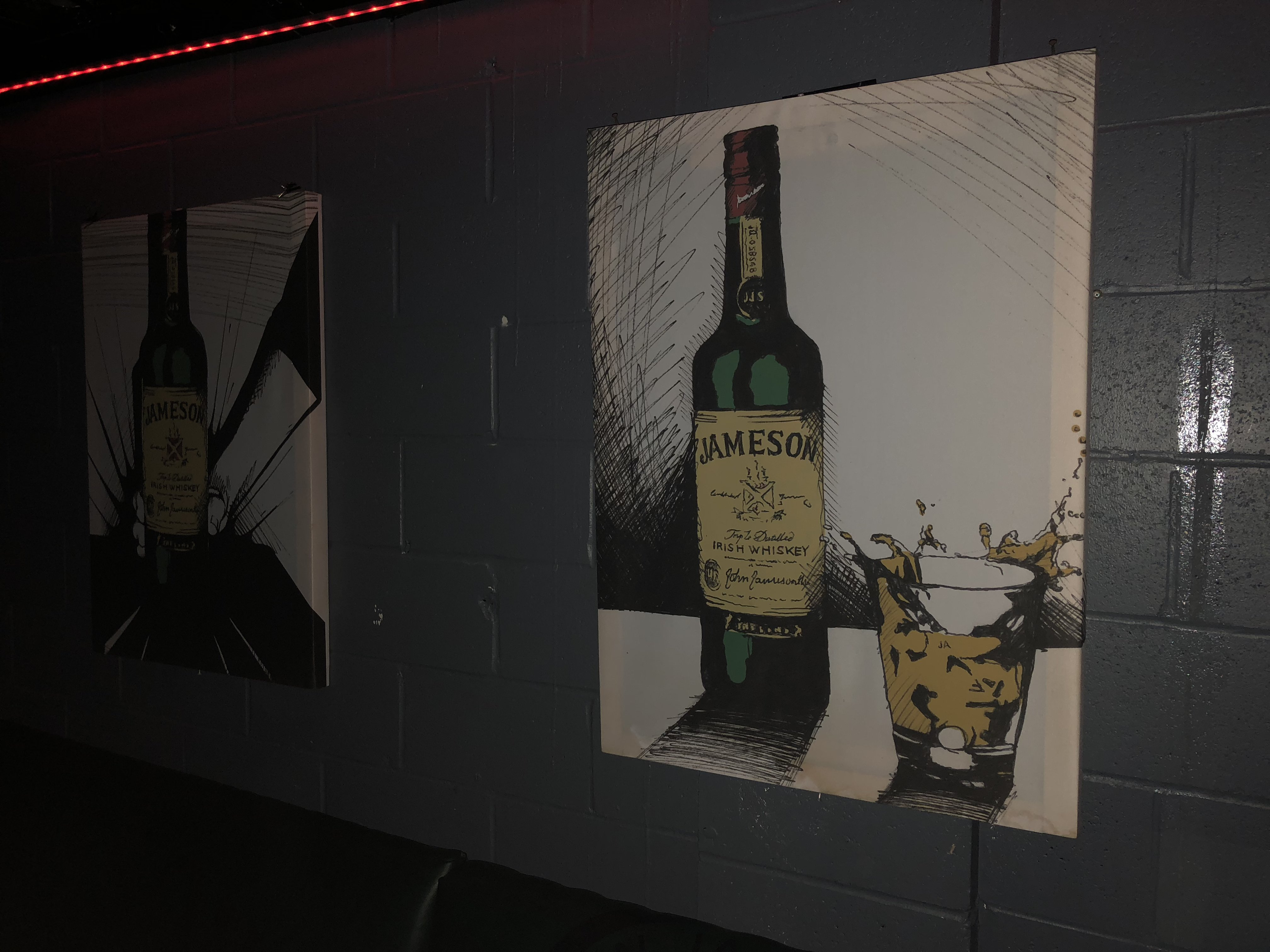
Jameson whiskey artwork in The Mod Club Theatre during a 2018 The Oh Hellos concert.

=== The Mod Club Theatre ===
The Mod Club Theatre opened in 2002, taking over a location that had until then functioned as The Corner Pocket pool hall, owned and operated by Toronto entrepreneur Bruno Sinopoli. The area of the city had had some past live music history, with the Apocalypse Club, a dive bar and live music venue catering to fans of the thrash metal, punk, grunge, and hardcore genres, operating next door at 750 College Street during the late 1980s and early 1990s.

The Mod Club featured theme nights such as ska nights, and Velvet Goldmine nights featuring glam music. Holmes also deejayed at the club under the name DJ MRK, and from 2003 to 2007 his Thursday night shows were broadcast live from 102.1 The Edge.

The venue opened with a focus on British musical artists and hosted live performances by artists such as Amy Winehouse, Muse, New Order and Keane. Other performers that played at the club included The Killers, Metric, Calvin Harris, The Lumineers, Sia, John Mayer, Florence + the Machine, Cypress Hill, Yukon Blonde, Noel Gallagher's High Flying Birds and Lana Del Rey. The Weeknd referred to the nightclub as "the stage that changed my life," having performed his first live concert there in 2011.

The Mod Club came to an end in 2020, during the COVID-19 lockdowns.

=== The Axis Club ===
In late 2021, the entertainment venue reopened as The Axis Club under new management. The club's general manager, Orin Bristol of INK Entertainment, previously worked as both a director and operator of various Toronto venues, including The Guvernment.

=== Return to The Mod Club ===
On June 14, 2025, the venue rebranded back to its original name, The Mod Club.
