= Mark Holmes (musician) =

British-born Canadian musician (born 1960)

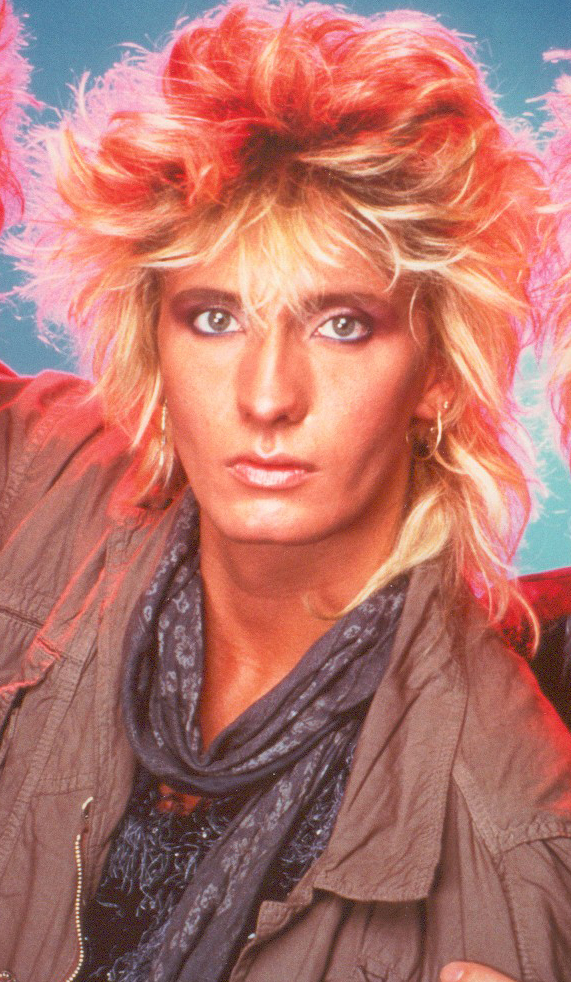
- Holmes in 1984

Background information
- Also known as: DJ MRK
- Born: July 26, 1960 (age 66); Mansfield, England
- Origin: Toronto, Ontario, Canada
- Genres: New wave; pop rock; glam rock
- Occupations: Singer; songwriter; musician; DJ; club owner
- Instruments: Vocals, bass, guitar, keyboards
- Years active: 1979–present
- Labels: Epic Canada; CBS Records; Sony Music Canada
- Member of: Platinum Blonde
- Formerly of: Vertigo; No. 9

Mark Holmes (born July 26, 1960) is a British-Canadian musician.

He is best known as the lead vocalist of the Canadian rock band Platinum Blonde. He also co-founded the Mod Club Theatre, an entertainment venue in Toronto that operated from 2002 to 2020.

== Early life ==
Mark Holmes emigrated from Mansfield, England to Canada in 1977. As a youth he had hopes of becoming a professional soccer player. Once in Toronto, he attended commercial art college, apprenticed in hairdressing and played in bands on the side.

== Career ==
In 1979, Holmes, along with musicians Joey Ciotti and Ray Bailie, formed Platinum Blonde, a punk and new wave band. Holmes provided vocals and guitar, Ciotti vocals and bass guitar, and Bailie on drums. They played songs by such artists as Marc Bolan, Gary Glitter and The Police. In 1980 they released a 7-inch single with the original songs "Hey Hey You" and "No Regrets", but eventually disbanded.

In 1982 Holmes placed a want ad in a Toronto newspaper looking for new musicians to join the band. Percussionist Chris Steffler and guitarist Sergio Galli answered the ad. By 1984, Platinum Blonde was one of the top-selling Canadian bands in Canada, second only to Rush. In addition to lead vocals, Holmes served as the band's bassist until Kenny MacLean joined the band in 1985.

Holmes moved to California in 1986 and played some small acting roles on both television and film. In 1988, he and the other members Platinum Blonde appeared as alien bikers in the episode "Eye for an Eye" of the sci-fi television series War of the Worlds. The band also appeared in the episode "Mug Shot" on the Mr. T series T. and T. that same year. Holmes also appeared in the 1989 film Eddie and the Cruisers II: Eddie Lives!

Platinum Blonde dissolved in 1989, although the album Yeah Yeah Yeah was released under the band name The Blondes in 1990. MacLean told the Calgary Herald in 1990 that he was "not proud of" the album and that it was produced out of "contractual obligation." In 1999 Holmes told Maclean's that drugs and poor business decisions played a role in the band's demise and told the Edmonton Journal that he had been involved in a four-year battle with Sony to regain the rights to his songs and get out of his contracts.

After the breakup, Holmes moved from California back to Britain for a time then returned to Toronto in 1993. In 1996, Holmes, along with former Platinum Blonde drummer Sascha Tukatsch and musician Dave Barrett, formed a band called Vertigo that later became known as No. 9. Described by C. J. O'Connor of the Toronto Star as "pre-inflatable-pig Pink Floyd, powered by Marshall/clothed by Galliano," the band's sound was inspired by the music of the late 1960–early 1970 London rock scene. The band was not finding any labels to take them on, so Holmes began to organize once-monthly club events, called "Orange Alert". The "Orange Alert" events were inspired by happenings of the 1960s and got their name from the alert that sounded whenever penal colonists attempted an escape during the 1960s, British TV series, The Prisoner.

In 1999 these happenings were rebranded as "Mod Club" nights, which were held Thursdays at the Toronto nightclub, Lava Lounge. Due to the popularity of these shows, Holmes and partner, Bobbi Guy (a fellow British-expat who managed the Toronto record store Sam the Record Man,) added Mod Club shows on Saturdays at the nightclub Revival, which was situated in a former Baptist church. Attendees of these club nights dressed in mod-inspired fashions. Mod Club nights incorporated R&B, funk and soul music from the 1960s, music from the mod revival scenes of the 1970s and 1980s as well as 1990s Britpop.

In 2002 Mark Holmes and Guy approached Bruno Sinopoli about joining his team to establish Mod Club Theatre in a venue that was previously a pool hall called Corner Pocket owned by Bruno. Holmes convinced the venue's owner, Bruno Sinopoli, to convert it into a nightclub venue. Holmes deejayed at the club under the name DJ MRK and from 2003 to 2007 his Thursday night shows were broadcast live from 102.1 The Edge. The venue also hosted live performances by artists as Amy Winehouse, Muse, New Order, The Killers and Keane.

In 2010, Holmes, Galli, and Steffler reunited and played their first Platinum Blonde reunion show at The Mod Club. Three days later the band was inducted into the Radio and Television Broadcasters Association Hall of Fame. Holmes, along with Galli, drummer Dan Todd and bassist Rob Laidlaw, released the Platinum Blonde album Now & Never in 2012.

As of 2020, Platinum Blonde reformed as a trio with Holmes returning to playing bass, Galli returning on guitar, and Justin "Juice" Kadis on drums. The Mod Club came to an end and closed its doors in 2020.

== Personal life ==
Holmes relocated to California in 1986 and was in a relationship with actress Nancy McKeon. He moved from Los Angeles to Britain before returning again to Toronto in 1993. At the time he resided in the High Park area of the city. He had a son, Justin.

In a 2004 interview he said that he enjoyed watching and playing hockey, as well as boxing and weight training to stay in shape. He is also a fan of Manchester United.
