= 2021 in heavy metal music =

This is a timeline documenting the events of heavy metal in the year 2021.

== Bands formed ==
- The Halo Effect
- PeelingFlesh
- Immortal Disfigurement

== Bands disbanded ==
- Bodom After Midnight
- Demons & Wizards
- Hellyeah (hiatus)
- Lotus Eater
- Lovebites (hiatus)
- Meliah Rage (hiatus)
- Sixx:A.M. (hiatus)

== Bands reformed ==
- Before the Dawn
- Deadguy
- Defleshed
- Mudvayne
- Mystic Circle
- Porcupine Tree
- Shadows Fall
- Sleeping by the Riverside
- Structures
- Vampires Everywhere!

== Deaths ==
- January 6 – Paul de Leon, drummer of Las Cruces, died from COVID-19 at the age of 52.
- January 10 – Marsha Zazula, co-founder of Megaforce Records, died of cancer at the age of 68.
- January 13 – Tim Bogert, former bassist of Cactus and Vanilla Fudge, died of cancer at the age of 76.
- February 5 – Örs Siklósi, vocalist of AWS, died from leukemia at the age of 29.
- February 18 – Tony Matuzak, former guitarist of Lizzy Borden, died from undisclosed reasons at the age of 59.
- February 24 – Sean Kennedy, former bassist of I Killed the Prom Queen, died by suicide at the age of 35.
- March 7 – Lars-Göran Petrov, vocalist of Entombed A.D. and former vocalist of Entombed, died from bile duct cancer at the age of 49.
- March 8 – Adrian Bărar, guitarist of Cargo, died from COVID-19 at the age of 61.
- March 14 – Gerri Miller, former editor of Metal Edge, died of cancer at the age of 67.
- March 16 – Walter van Cortenberg, drummer of Ancient Rites, died from a heart attack at the age of 51.
- March 17 – Corey Steger, former guitarist of Underoath, died in a car accident at the age of 42.
- March 26 – Brett Bradshaw, former drummer of Faster Pussycat, died from undisclosed reasons.
- April 18 – Lars "Ratz" Ranzenberger, bassist of Metalium, died in an airplane crash at the age of 53.
- April 29 – John Hinch, former drummer of Judas Priest, died from undisclosed reasons at the age of 73.
- May 9 – Robb Farr, bassist of Warrior, died from undisclosed reasons at the age of 58.
- May 13 – William J. Tsamis, guitarist of Warlord, died from undisclosed reasons at the age of 60.
- May 17 – D.V. "Dirt" Karloff, former bassist of Society 1, died from undisclosed reasons at the age of 48.
- June 11 – Sven Gross, vocalist of Fleshcrawl, died from cancer at the age of 44.
- June 23 – Alan Lewis, music journalist, former editor of Sounds magazine, founder of Kerrang! magazine, who was credited for coining the term "New wave of British heavy metal", died from cancer and Parkinson's disease complications at the age of 75.
- June 26 – Johnny Solinger, former vocalist of Skid Row, died from liver failure at the age of 55.
- June 29 – John Lawton, vocalist of Lucifer's Friend and former vocalist of Uriah Heep, died from undisclosed reasons at the age of 74.
- July 1 – Bryan St. Pere, drummer of Hum, died from undisclosed reasons at the age of 52.
- July 10 – Chris Hutka, former vocalist of The Bunny the Bear, died from undisclosed reasons.
- July 14 – Jeff LaBar, former guitarist of Cinderella, died from undisclosed reasons at the age of 58.
- July 14 – Gary Corbett, former touring keyboardist of Kiss and Cinderella, died from lung cancer.
- July 26 – Mike Howe, vocalist of Metal Church and former vocalist of Heretic, died by suicide by hanging at the age of 55.
- July 26 – Joey Jordison, drummer of Sinsaenum and Vimic, former drummer of Slipknot and Scar the Martyr, and former guitarist of Murderdolls, died from undisclosed reasons at the age of 46.
- August 8 – Tim Audette, former guitarist of Fuck the Facts, died from multiple sclerosis.
- August 21 – George Horn, recording engineer for numerous artists and genres, including Exodus, Fantômas, Neurosis, and Racer X, died from COVID-19 complications at the age of 87.
- August 22 – Eric Wagner, vocalist of The Skull and former vocalist of Trouble, died from COVID-19 at the age of 62.
- September 3 – Jochen Schröder, former guitarist of Rage, died from undisclosed reasons at the age of 58.
- October 13 – Andrea Haugen, former guest vocalist of albums by Cradle of Filth and Satyricon, and ex-wife of Emperor guitarist Samoth, died in the Kongsberg attacks at the age of 52.
- October 29 – Eric Greif, musician, producer, lawyer, longtime manager of Chuck Schuldiner and Death, and president of Perseverance Holdings (overseeing Chuck Schuldiner's intellectual property rights) died of kidney failure and complications from diabetes at the age of 59.
- October 29 – Malcolm Dome, music journalist and author, credited with coining the term "thrash metal", died from undisclosed reasons at the age of 66.
- November 13 – Gregory Clifford "Greg" Mayne, original Pentagram bassist and member during two stints, died from lung cancer at the age of 67.
- November 18 – Mick Rock, photographer of numerous rock and metal bands including Mötley Crüe, Ozzy Osbourne, Thin Lizzy, and Jane's Addiction, died from undisclosed reasons at the age of 72.
- November 19 – Hank von Hell, former vocalist of Doctor Midnight & The Mercy Cult, died from undisclosed reasons at the age of 49.
- November 24 – Gared O'Donnell, vocalist of Planes Mistaken for Stars, died from esophageal cancer at the age of 44.
- December 17 – Matthew Wolfe, former drummer of Byzantine, died from a battle with addiction at the age of 46.
- December 19 – Ron Anderson, vocal coach for numerous vocalists of rock and metal bands including Guns N' Roses, Cinderella, Soundgarden, Avenged Sevenfold, Alter Bridge, Ozzy Osbourne, and Trivium, died from undisclosed reasons at the age of 75.

== Events ==
- Numerous heavy metal-associated festivals, including Download, Wacken Open Air, Hellfest, Bloodstock Open Air, Maryland Deathfest, Sweden Rock Festival and Dynamo MetalFest, were scheduled to return in 2021 after the 2020 editions of those festivals were cancelled, due to the COVID-19 pandemic. Due to the ongoing pandemic, however, Sweden Rock, Hellfest, Download and Wacken Open Air were once again cancelled.
- Tommy Vext of Bad Wolves departs from the band, citing his conservative political beliefs as an issue.
- After nearly two decades with Nightwish, Marko Hietala departs from the band and the public eye, citing his struggles with chronic depression and his disillusionment with the music scene in general. Nightwish subsequently announced Jukka Koskinen of Wintersun as their session bass player for the Human. :II: Nature. World Tour.
- Martijn Westerholt announces that Charlotte Wessels, Otto Schimmelpenninck van der Oije, Timo Somers and Joey de Boer have departed from Delain and that the band will continue as a solo project.
- In January, Iced Earth founder Jon Schaffer appeared on the Most Wanted section of the FBI after being photographed taking part of the 2021 storming of the United States Capitol, on six felony charges, after turning himself in to authorities. On February 15, vocalist Stu Block and bassist Luke Appleton both announced their resignation from the band as a result of the event, along with Jake Dreyer to focus on his band Witherfall, thus leaving behind Schaffer and Brent Smedley with the fate of the band unknown.
- On February 2, Cannibal Corpse announced that Erik Rutan has officially joined the band as a full-time member. Rutan has been a live member since 2019, replacing Pat O'Brien, after the latter's 2018 arrest and subsequent legal problems.
- On April 13, Tom Hunting revealed that earlier in February he was diagnosed with squamous cell carcinoma of the stomach. For this reason, the release of the band's eleventh studio album Persona Non Grata has been postponed to November. It will coincide with the band's upcoming autumn tour, making it possible for Hunting to participate as well. According to Exodus members, he is expected to make a recovery.
- On May 24, Dave Mustaine announced that Megadeth had officially parted ways with David Ellefson for the second time, after sexual misconduct accusations. Later, in August, the band announced the return of former member James LoMenzo as a session bass player for the upcoming "Metal Tour of the Year".
- On June 18, Helloween released its sixteenth self-titled studio album, which marked the return of co-founder Kai Hansen and Michael Kiske as studio members, for the first time since their departures from the band in 1989 and 1993, respectively.
- On July 2, longtime Queensrÿche guitarist Parker Lundgren announced his departure from the band, in order to pursue other business ventures. Rejoining the band on tour and later full-time would be his predecessor Mike Stone.
- On July 29, Stephen Pearcy revealed that he has been battling liver cancer during the last three years.
- On August 2, Rudy Sarzo announced his return to Quiet Riot, as a personal request from Frankie Banali, in order for the band to have an original member after Banali's death. Sarzo will replace Chuck Wright at the conclusion of the band's 2021 tour.
- On August 2, Stu Block announced his return to Into Eternity, where he will be sharing vocal duties with Amanda Kiernan, who replaced Block in 2013 after he joined Iced Earth.
- On August 5, longtime guitarist Marc Rizzo confirmed his departure from Soulfly. The band subsequently announced Dino Cazares as Rizzo's replacement for the August–September U.S. tour.
- On August 13, Mikael Stanne announced the departure of longtime drummer Anders Jivarp and bassist Anders Iwers from Dark Tranquillity.
- On August 19, Destruction and founding member Mike Sifringer officially announced their split. Sifringer was replaced by Martin Furia.
- On August 22, Gloryhammer announced the departure of vocalist Thomas Winkler.

== Albums released ==
=== January ===
Day	Artist	Album
8	Sammy Hagar and the Circle	Lockdown 2020 (covers album)
13	Band-Maid	Unseen World
13	Gatecreeper	An Unexpected Reality (EP)
15	Bloody Hammers	Songs of Unspeakable Terror
15	Dale Crover	Rat-A-Tat-Tat!
15	Dragony	Viribus Unitis
15	Edenbridge	The Chronicles of Eden, Part 2 (compilation album)
15	Front Line Assembly	Mechanical Soul
15	Ingested	Stinking Cesspool of Liquefied Human Remnants (EP)
16	Diocletian	Darkness Swallows All (EP)
22	Asphyx	Necroceros
22	Ektomorf	Reborn
22	Human Fortress	Epic Tales & Untold Stories (compilation album)
22	Labyrinth	Welcome to the Absurd Circus
22	Nervosa	Perpetual Chaos
22	Susemihl	Alienation
22	Therion	Leviathan
22	Wig Wam	Never Say Die
23	Ewigkeit	Depopulate (EP)
29	Accept	Too Mean to Die
29	The Body	I've Seen All I Need to See
29	Crystal Viper	The Cult
29	Michael Schenker Group	Immortal
29	Soen	Imperial
29	Tribulation	Where the Gloom Becomes Sound
30	Dream Theater	Images, Words & Beyond Live in Japan 2017 (live album)

=== February ===
Day	Artist	Album
5	Angelus Apatrida	Angelus Apatrida
5	Cult of Luna	The Raging River (EP)
5	Korpiklaani	Jylhä
5	Product of Hate	You Brought This War
5	The Ruins of Beverast	The Thule Grimoires
5	Todd La Torre	Rejoice in the Suffering
7	Loathe	The Things They Believe
12	Abiotic	Ikigai
12	Ablaze My Sorrow	Among Ashes and Monoliths
12	Aborym	Hostile
12	Durbin	The Beast Awakens
12	Fallstar	Sunbreather
12	Inglorious	We Will Ride
12	Joel Hoekstra's 13	Running Games
12	Love and Death	Perfectly Preserved
12	Sirenia	Riddles, Ruins & Revelations
19	The Amenta	Revelator
19	Crystallion	Heads or Tails
19	Detritus	Myths
19	Harakiri for the Sky	Mære
19	Icon for Hire	Amorphous
19	Krokus	Adios Amigos Live @ Wacken (live album)
19	Lake of Tears	Ominous
19	Ricky Warwick	When Life Was Hard and Fast
19	A Scent Like Wolves	Mystic Auras
19	Sister	Vengeance Ignited
19	Temperance	Melodies of Green and Blue (EP)
19	Whitesnake	The Blues Album (compilation album)
19	Wizard	Metal in My Head
22	Ævangelist	Dream an Evil Dream III
26	Alice Cooper	Detroit Stories
26	Architects	For Those That Wish to Exist
26	Bonfire	Roots
26	Einherjer	North Star
26	Empyrium	Über den Sternen
26	Epica	Omega
26	Evergrey	Escape of the Phoenix
26	Helstar	Clad in Black
26	King Gizzard & the Lizard Wizard	L.W.
26	Kreator	Under the Guillotine: The Noise Records Anthology (compilation album)
26	Lee Kerslake	Eleventeen
26	Melvins	Working with God
26	Moonspell	Hermitage
26	Northlane	5G (EP)
26	Of Mice & Men	Timeless (EP)

=== March ===
Day	Artist	Album
5	A Day to Remember	You're Welcome
5	B Chaos (MX)	Sweet Funky Hole
5	Baest	Necro Sapiens
5	Brand of Sacrifice	Lifeblood
5	Chevelle	Niratias
5	Demon Hunter	Songs of Death and Resurrection
5	Iron Man	Hail to the Riff (live album)
5	Ken Hensley	My Book of Answers
5	Nightfall	At Night We Prey
5	Venomous Concept	Deep Thinking in Deep Times (EP)
5	Windir	The Sognametal Legacy (compilation album)
7	The Architect Of Nightmares	Fearing The Unknown
10	Lovebites	Glory, Glory, to the World (EP)
12	Conan	Live at Freak Valley (live album)
12	The Crown	Royal Destroyer
12	Eisbrecher	Liebe Macht Monster
12	Eyehategod	A History of Nomadic Behavior
12	Gizmachi	Omega Kaleid
12	Heart Healer	Heart Healer
12	Orden Ogan	Final Days
12	Rob Zombie	The Lunar Injection Kool Aid Eclipse Conspiracy
12	Secret Sphere	Lifeblood
12	Thunder	All the Right Noises
19	Agent Steel	No Other Godz Before Me
19	Batushka	Царю Небесный (EP)
19	Enforcer	Live by Fire II (live album)
19	Erra	Erra
19	Nine Treasures	Awakening from Dukkha (compilation album)
19	Saxon	Inspirations (covers album)
19	Serj Tankian	Elasticity (EP)
19	Trollfest	Happy Heroes (EP)
19	U.D.O.	Live in Bulgaria 2020 – Pandemic Survival Show (live album)
22	Nazxul	Irkalla
26	Antagonist A.D.	All Things (EP)
26	As Everything Unfolds	Within Each Lies the Other
26	Evanescence	The Bitter Truth
26	Genghis Tron	Dream Weapon
26	Memoriam	To the End
26	Necronomicon	The Final Chapter
26	The Quill	Earthrise
26	Tomahawk	Tonic Immobility

=== April ===
Day	Artist	Album
2	Cactus	Tightrope
2	Darkthrone	Shadows of Iconoclasm (box set)
2	Haunt	Beautiful Distraction
2	Lord	Undercovers (covers album)
2	Sacred Oath	Return of the Dragon
6	Killing Addiction	Mind of a New God
9	Årabrot	Norwegian Gothic
9	Arion	Vultures Die Alone
9	Blaze Bayley	War Within Me
9	Dalriada	Őszelő
9	Devil Sold His Soul	Loss
9	Elgibbor	Corruptus Vindicta
9	The End Machine	Phase2
9	Kauan	Ice Fleet
9	Mägo de Oz	Bandera Negra
9	Primal Fear	I Will Be Gone (EP)
9	Saille	V
9	Zao	The Crimson Corridor
16	The Armed	Ultrapop
16	August Burns Red	Guardians Sessions (EP)
16	Cannibal Corpse	Violence Unimagined
16	Escape the Fate	Chemical Warfare
16	Liquid Tension Experiment	Liquid Tension Experiment 3
16	Liv Kristine	Have Courage Dear Heart (EP)
16	Marty Friedman	Tokyo Jukebox 3
16	Wednesday 13	Necrophase: Antidote (EP)
16	While She Sleeps	Sleeps Society
20	Bongzilla	Weedsconsin
23	Bodom After Midnight	Paint the Sky with Blood (EP)
23	Frozen Crown	Winterbane
23	Gilby Clarke	The Gospel Truth
23	Motörhead	Louder Than Noise... Live in Berlin (live album)
23	Paysage d'Hiver	Geister
23	Solstice	Casting the Die
28	Novelbright	Opening Declaration
29	Pig Destroyer	Pornographers of Sound: Live in NYC (live album)
30	Axewitch	Out of the Ashes Into the Fire
30	Electric Boys	Ups!de Down
30	Evile	Hell Unleashed
30	Gojira	Fortitude
30	Poverty's No Crime	A Secret to Hide
30	Tetrarch	Unstable
30	Trauma	Acrimony (EP)
30	Vreid	Wild North West

=== May ===
Day	Artist	Album
1	Tarantula	Thunder Tunes from Lusitania
7	Artillery	X
7	Candlemass	Green Valley Live (live album)
7	Robin McAuley	Standing on the Edge
7	Saliva	Every Twenty Years (EP)
7	Skarlett Riot	Invicta
7	Staind	Live: It's Been Awhile (live album)
7	Sumo Cyco	Initiation
7	Todd Michael Hall	Sonic Healing
14	Caliban	Zeitgeister
14	Canvas Solaris	Chromosphere
14	Charlie Benante	Silver Linings (covers album)
14	Myles Kennedy	The Ides of March
14	Per Wiberg	All Is Well in the Land of the Living, But for the Rest of Us... (EP)
14	Subterranean Masquerade	Mountain Fever
15	Panopticon	...And Again Into the Light
18	Edu Falaschi	Vera Cruz
21	Amorphis	Live at Helsinki Ice Hall (live album)
21	Debauchery	Monster Metal
21	The Devil Wears Prada	ZII (EP)
21	Herman Frank	Two for a Lie
21	Lindemann	Live in Moscow (live album)
21	Monster Magnet	A Better Dystopia (covers album)
21	Nadja	Luminous Rot
21	Northlane	2D (EP)
21	Pop Evil	Versatile
21	Trick or Treat	The Unlocked Songs (compilation album)
21	Vola	Witness
25	Reflections	Silhouette (EP)
28	Alestorm	Live in Tilburg (live album)
28	Bloodbound	Creatures of the Dark Realm
28	Cirith Ungol	Half Past Human (EP)
28	Gwar	The Disc with No Name (EP)
28	King of Asgard	Svartrviðr
28	Of Mice & Men	Bloom (EP)
28	Portal	Avow
28	Portal	Hagbulbia
28	Tygers of Pan Tang	Majors & Minors (compilation album)
31	Jointhunter	The Light Blinds You

=== June ===
Day	Artist	Album
1	Hannes Grossmann	To Where the Light Retreats
4	Atreyu	Baptize
4	Cloak of Altering	Sheathed Swords Drip with Poisonous Honey
4	Code	Flyblown Prince
4	Death Therapy	Melancholy Machines
4	Desaster	Churches Without Saints
4	Flotsam and Jetsam	Blood in the Water
4	Paul Gilbert	Werewolves of Portland
4	Red Fang	Arrows
4	Rhapsody of Fire	I'll Be Your Hero (EP)
4	Van Canto	To the Power of Eight
8	Poppy	Eat (NXT Soundtrack) (EP)
11	Dornenreich	Du Wilde Liebe Sei
11	General Surgery	Lay Down and Be Counted (EP)
11	Green Jellÿ	Garbage Band Kids
11	King Gizzard & the Lizard Wizard	Butterfly 3000
11	Kiss	Off the Soundboard: Tokyo 2001 (live album)
11	Machine Head	Arrows in Words from the Sky (EP)
11	Mammoth WVH	Mammoth WVH
11	Mr. Bungle	The Night They Came Home (live album)
11	This Ending	Needles of Rust
11	Wristmeetrazor	Replica of a Strange Love
18	Bossk	Migration
18	Fear Factory	Aggression Continuum
18	Hacktivist	Hyperdialect
18	Helloween	Helloween
18	Pharaoh	The Powers That Be
18	Subway to Sally	Eisheilige Nacht – Back to Lindenpark (live album)
18	Timo Tolkki's Avalon	The Enigma Birth
25	The Absence	Coffinized
25	Amenra	De Doorn
25	Beartooth	Below
25	Darkthrone	Eternal Hails
25	Dream Theater	Images and Words – Live in Japan, 2017 (live album)
25	Iceburn	Asclepius
25	Lacuna Coil	Live from the Apocalypse (live album)
25	Light the Torch	You Will Be the Death of Me
25	North of South	The Tides in Our Veins
25	Pestilence	Exitivm
25	Scale the Summit	Subjects
25	Suidakra	Wolfbite
25	Thy Catafalque	Vadak
25	Withered	Verloren

=== July ===
Day	Artist	Album
2	At the Gates	The Nightmare of Being
2	Born of Osiris	Angel or Alien
2	Die Apokalyptischen Reiter	The Divine Horsemen
2	Lord of the Lost	Judas
2	Mondo Generator	Live at Bronson (live album)
2	Nanowar of Steel	Italian Folk Metal
2	Steve Whiteman	You're Welcome
2	Year of No Light	Consolamentum
9	Eighteen Visions	1996 (covers album)
9	Hardline	Heart, Mind and Soul
9	L.A. Guns	Cocked & Loaded Live (live album)
9	Mayhem	Atavistic Black Disorder / Kommando (EP)
9	Misery Index	Coffin Up the Nails (compilation album)
9	Structures	None of the Above (EP)
9	Xasthur	Victims of the Times
16	Crescent	Carving the Fires of Akhet
16	Paradise Lost	At the Mill (live album)
16	Powerwolf	Call of the Wild
16	Resurrection Kings	Skygazer
16	Times of Grace	Songs of Loss and Separation
23	Alexis Marshall	House of Lull. House of When
23	Attila	Closure
23	Bernie Marsden	Kings
23	Hed PE	Sandmine (EP)
23	Lee Aaron	Radio On!
23	Mordred	The Dark Parade
23	Phoenix Rising	Acta Est Fabula
23	Tantric	The Sum of All Things
23	Yngwie Malmsteen	Parabellum
30	Axel Rudi Pell	Diamonds Unlocked II (covers album)
30	Chunk! No, Captain Chunk!	Gone Are the Good Days
30	Dee Snider	Leave a Scar
30	Geezer Butler	Manipulations of the Mind – The Complete Collection (box set)
30	The Ghost Inside	Rise from the Ashes: Live at the Shrine (live album)
30	Loch Vostok	Opus Ferox – The Great Escape
30	Netherbird	Arete
30	Seether	Wasteland – The Purgatory EP (EP)
30	Swallow the Sun	20 Years of Gloom, Beauty and Despair – Live in Helsinki (live album)

=== August ===
Day	Artist	Album
6	Night Ranger	ATBPO
6	Serj Tankian	Cinematique Series – Illuminate
6	Serj Tankian	Cinematique Series – Violent Violins
13	Act of Denial	Negative
13	Destruction	Live Attack (live album)
13	Diskord	Degenerations
13	Jack Russell's Great White	Great Zeppelin II: A Tribute to Led Zeppelin (covers album)
13	Keith Wallen	This World or the Next
13	Lorna Shore	...And I Return to Nothingness (EP)
13	Quicksand	Distant Populations
13	Sepultura	SepulQuarta (compilation album)
13	Slaughter to Prevail	Kostolom
20	Alberto Rigoni	Metal Addicted (EP)
20	Between the Buried and Me	Colors II
20	Deafheaven	Infinite Granite
20	George Lynch	Seamless
20	Necronautical	Slain in the Spirit
20	Sodom	Bombenhagel (EP)
20	Ulver	Hexahedron – Live at Henie Onstad Kunstsenter (live album)
20	Wolves in the Throne Room	Primordial Arcana
23	Graveland	Hour of Ragnarok
27	Ex Deo	The Thirteen Years of Nero
27	Hooded Menace	The Tritonus Bell
27	Jinjer	Wallflowers
27	Leprous	Aphelion
27	Obscurity	Skogarmaors
27	Phinehas	The Fire Itself
27	Tesseract	P O R T A L S (live album)
27	Sculptured	The Liminal Phase
27	Sons of Alpha Centauri	Push
27	Spirit Adrift	Forge Your Future (EP)
27	Thyrfing	Vanagandr

=== September ===
Day	Artist	Album
3	Carnifex	Graveside Confessions
3	Earth Groans	The Body (EP)
3	Iron Maiden	Senjutsu
10	Aborted	ManiaCult
10	Andrew W.K.	God Is Partying
10	Anette Olzon	Strong
10	Gamma Ray	30 Years Live Anniversary (live album)
10	Gwar	Scumdogs Live (live album)
10	M.ill.ion	Back on Track
17	Alien Weaponry	Tangaroa
17	Brainstorm	Wall of Skulls
17	Carcass	Torn Arteries
17	Charlotte Wessels	Tales from Six Feet Under
17	Criminal	Sacrificio
17	Edge of Paradise	The Unknown
17	Insomnium	Argent Moon (EP)
17	The Plot in You	Swan Song
17	Rage	Resurrection Day
17	The Raven Age	Exile (compilation album)
17	Spiritbox	Eternal Blue
17	Whyzdom	Of Wonders and Wars
24	Aeon Zen	Transversal
24	Doro	Triumph and Agony Live (live album)
24	Ex Umbra	From The Shadows, Pt. 2 (EP)
24	Orbit Culture	Shaman (EP)
24	A Pale Horse Named Death	Infernum in Terra
24	Paradox	Heresy II – End of a Legend
24	Poppy	Flux
24	Rivers of Nihil	The Work
24	Signs of the Swarm	Absolvere
24	Skepticism	Companion
24	Sleep Token	This Place Will Become Your Tomb
24	Tremonti	Marching in Time
24	Unto Others	Strength
24	Uriah Heep	Choices (box set)
24	Uriah Heep	Every Day Rocks (box set)
24	We Butter the Bread with Butter	Das Album
26	Chris Holmes	Unbearable Influence

=== October ===
Day	Artist	Album
1	Asking Alexandria	See What's on the Inside
1	Enslaved	Caravans to the Outer Worlds (EP)
1	Full of Hell	Garden of Burning Apparitions
1	Katatonia	Mnemosynean (compilation album)
1	KK's Priest	Sermons of the Sinner
1	Kryptos	Force of Danger
1	Ministry	Moral Hygiene
1	Vampires Everywhere!	The Awakening (EP)
1	Wage War	Manic
8	Eclipse	Wired
8	Gus G	Quantum Leap
8	Shy, Low	Snake Behind the Sun
8	Trivium	In the Court of the Dragon
15	Aeon	God Ends Here
15	The Agonist	Days Before the World Wept (EP)
15	Alcatrazz	V
15	Ded	School of Thought
15	dUg Pinnick	Joy Bomb
15	Gemini Syndrome	3rd Degree – The Raising
15	Hate	Rugia
15	Ice Nine Kills	The Silver Scream 2: Welcome to Horrorwood
15	Lords of Black	Alchemy of Souls, Part II
15	Melvins	Five Legged Dog
15	Necromantia	To the Depths We Descend...
15	Tom Morello	The Atlas Underground Fire
15	Twelve Foot Ninja	Vengeance
15	Vildhjarta	Måsstaden Under Vatten
22	Armored Saint	Symbol of Salvation Live (live album)
22	Bloodred Hourglass	Your Highness
22	Burning Point	Arsonist of the Soul
22	Cradle of Filth	Existence Is Futile
22	Dream Theater	A View from the Top of the World
22	Every Time I Die	Radical
22	Exhumed	Worming (EP)
22	Massacre	Resurgence
22	Sixx:A.M.	Hits (compilation album)
22	U.D.O.	Game Over
22	Waking the Cadaver	Authority Through Intimidation
29	Archspire	Bleed the Future
29	Attack Attack!	Long Time, No Sea (EP)
29	Bad Wolves	Dear Monsters
29	Be'lakor	Coherence
29	Beast in Black	Dark Connection
29	Black Veil Brides	The Phantom Tomorrow
29	Count Raven	The Sixth Storm
29	Death SS	Ten
29	Ghost Bath	Self Loather
29	Helheim	WoduridaR
29	Impending Doom	Hellbent (EP)
29	Jerry Cantrell	Brighten
29	John 5	Sinner
29	Kayo Dot	Moss Grew on the Swords and Plowshares Alike
29	Lucifer	Lucifer IV
29	Mastodon	Hushed and Grim
29	Running Wild	Blood on Blood
29	Thulcandra	A Dying Wish
29	Whitechapel	Kin
31	Limp Bizkit	Still Sucks

=== November ===
Day	Artist	Album
2	Diablo Swing Orchestra	Swagger & Stroll Down the Rabbit Hole
5	Autokrator	Persecution
5	Bullet for My Valentine	Bullet for My Valentine
5	Emigrate	The Persistence of Memory
5	Gaahls Wyrd	The Humming Mountain (EP)
5	Omnium Gatherum	Origin
5	Portrayal of Guilt	Christfucker
5	Sarke	Allsighr
5	SeeYouSpaceCowboy	The Romance of Affliction
12	All Hail the Yeti	Within the Hollow Earth (EP)
12	Beatallica	The Devolver Album
12	Darkwoods My Betrothed	Angel of Carnage Unleashed
12	Enuff Z'Nuff	Hardrock Nite (covers album)
12	Haunt	Unplugged Vol. 1
12	L.A. Guns	Checkered Past
12	NorthTale	Eternal Flame
12	Scattered Hamlet	Stereo Overthrow
12	Show-Ya	Showdown
12	Silent Planet	Iridescent
12	Suffocation	Live in North America (live album)
12	Unleashed	No Sign of Life
19	Converge and Chelsea Wolfe	Bloodmoon: I (collaborative album)
19	The Darkness	Motorheart
19	Der Weg einer Freiheit	Noktvrn
19	Exodus	Persona Non Grata
19	Khemmis	Deceiver
19	Obscura	A Valediction
19	Pathology	The Everlasting Plague
19	Ross Jennings	A Shadow of My Future Self
19	Swallow the Sun	Moonflowers
19	Temperance	Diamanti
19	Thank You Scientist	Plague Accommodation (EP)
19	Theatres des Vampires	In Nomine Sanguinis
19	Volumes	Happier?
26	Archgoat	Worship the Eternal Darkness
26	Black Label Society	Doom Crew Inc.
26	Cynic	Ascension Codes
26	Death Angel	The Bastard Tracks (live album)
26	Deep Purple	Turning to Crime (covers album)
26	Hollow	Tower
26	Hypocrisy	Worship
26	Imminence	Heaven in Hiding
26	Imperial Triumphant	An Evening with Imperial Triumphant (live album)
26	In Mourning	The Bleeding Veil
26	Lock Up	The Dregs of Hades
26	Lordi	Lordiversity (box set)
26	Negură Bunget	Zău
26	The Ocean	Phanerozoic Live (live album)
26	Rhapsody of Fire	Glory for Salvation
26	Vardis	100 M.P.H. @ 100 Club (live album)
26	Victory	Gods of Tomorrow
26	Voices	Breaking the Trauma Bond
30	Oathean	The Endless Pain and Darkness

=== December ===
Day	Artist	Album
3	The Browning	End of Existence
3	Coronatus	Atmosphere
3	Devin Townsend	The Puzzle
3	Devin Townsend	Snuggles
3	Epica	Omega Live (live album)
3	Erdling	Helheim
3	Eyes Set to Kill	Damna (EP)
3	Failure	Wild Type Droid
3	Heiress	Distant Fires
3	Lethian Dreams	Last Echoes of Silence (EP)
3	Of Mice & Men	Ad Infinitum (EP)
3	Of Mice & Men	Echo
3	Pantheist	Closer to God
3	Unanimated	Victory in Blood
3	Volbeat	Servant of the Mind
8	Marc Storace	Live and Let Live
10	Funeral	Praesentialis in Aeternum
10	Lord of the Lost	The Sacrament of Judas (live album)
10	The Murder of My Sweet	A Gentleman's Legacy
10	Psilocybe Larvae	Where Silence Dwells
10	Siamese	Home
10	Stahlmann	Quarz
12	Big Dumb Face	Christmas in the Cave of Dagoth
15	Nemophila	Revive
17	Behemoth	In Absentia Dei (live album)
17	Funeral Mist	Deiform
17	Memory Garden	1349
17	Symphony of Heaven	Maniacal Entropik Discordium
24	Lacrimosa	Leidenschaft
29	Loudness	SUNBURST ~ Gamushara
30	Thomas Giles	Feel Nothing (EP)

Preceded by 2020	Heavy Metal Timeline; 2021	Succeeded by 2022
