= Nebulae Come Sweet =

Belarusian metal band

- Origin: Minsk, Belarus
- Genres: Post-metal; doom metal
- Years active: 2012–present

Nebulae Come Sweet is a four-piece Belarusian metal band formed in 2012. Their musical style is often referred to as post-metal and doom metal, with obvious influence of sludge metal, ambient, and post-rock. They are known for prominent live performances that feature controversial symbols such as a horned mask and crown of thorns, and intensive use of greasepaint. Their debut album "It Is Not The Night That Covers You" was released in 2016 and became critically acclaimed in Belarus and beyond.

== History ==
The band was formed in 2012 as a temporary project of 5 musicians, aimed to fill the lineup of a local rock festival which would have been cancelled otherwise. However, having been well accepted by the audience, the band decided to continue their activity after the festival.

The name "Nebulae Come Sweet" was taken from a poem written by the band's frontman.

In 2013 Nebulae Come Sweet released a split album and started playing live shows as a trio. In order to provoke the audience, the band covered themselves in black greasepaint and used such elements as Petrine Cross, crown of thorns, or a horned Lucifer's mask. The band states that the usage of those symbols in their performances started as a mere way of standing out, but later they built a concept around it.

In early 2016, the band released their second EP "Ophelia" that contained two alternative versions of the track previously released, the lyrics in which were inspired by the story of Shakespear's Ophelia.

Later that year the band released their debut LP "It Is Not The Night That Covers You". It features a number of session musicians, as well as guest vocals from Christopher Bennett of Illinois-based metal band Minsk on the track "T", and from Kristoffer Bäckström of Swedish sludge band Moloken on "Santa Sangre".

In early 2017, the release was followed by a live presentation in the band's hometown Minsk. With strings being an important part of the band's sound, they were joined by a cellist, thus becoming a four-piece outfit. As a quartet, they have performed a number of gigs across Russia and Belarus, and a tour around Ukraine. In autumn of 2017, Nebulae Come Sweet embarked on their first European tour with such doom metal bands as Frailty, Psilocybe Larvae, and Woe Unto Me. In 2018 the band played a number of shows in Belarus and Russia, including opening for Belgian black-metal outfit Wiegedood. In the beginning of 2019 Nebulae Come Sweet announced new permanent band members, which made them a five-piece band. They also teased the recording process of their second album, although its release date remains unknown. In May 2019 they played their first acoustic show in Minsk, with 6 old and 1 new track in acoustic arrangement. The show enjoyed warm welcome from the audience and acclamation from Belarusian media.

== Discography ==
=== Studio albums ===
- "It Is Not The Night That Covers You" (2016, self-released)
- "De Lumière" (2023, Solids Music)

=== Splits ===
- Split with Difleger (2013, self-released)

=== Extended plays ===
- "Ophelia" (2016, self-released)

=== Compilation appearances ===
- "Electric Funeral Cafe Vol.III" (2017, Robustfellow Prods.) (contributed "Santa Sangre")
- "Summer of Sludge Volume Three" (2017, Svbterranean) (contributed "T")
