= Viribus Unitis =

Viribus Unitis (With United Forces) may refer to

- Viribus Unitis (1914 album), 2025
- Viribus Unitis (Dragony album), 2021
- SMS Viribus Unitis, an Austro-Hungarian battleship launched in 1911 and sunk in 1918
- Pol. Viribus Unitis, an Italian football team
- Former motto of Namibia during its period as South West Africa.
- Motto of the house of Habsburg-Lorraine
- Motto of The International Legion, 2nd Battalion.
