= Tău (Negură Bunget album) =

Studio album by Negură Bunget
- Released: February 27, 2015
- Recorded: Recorded at Negură Music Studio
- Genre: Progressive metal, black metal, avant-garde metal, folk metal
- Length: 50:32
- Label: Lupus Lounge/Prophecy Productions
- Producer: Mihai Neagoe

Negură Bunget chronology
Vîrstele Pamîntului (2010)	Tău (2015)	Zi (2016)

Tău is the sixth studio album by Negură Bunget, released on February 27, 2015, by Lupus Lounge, a sublabel of Prophecy Productions.

When it was first announced in 2013, the album was listed as the first part of a planned "Transilvanian Trilogy".

== Track listing ==
1. "Nămetenie" – 10:16
2. "Izbucul galbenei" – 06:30
3. "La hotaru cu cinci culmi" – 04:11
4. "Curgerea muntelui" – 05:25
5. "Tărîm vîlhovnicesc" – 06:39
6. "Împodobeala timpului" – 06:12
7. "Picur viu foc" – 05:10
8. "Schimnicește" – 06:09

== Personnel ==
- Negru - drums, percussion, dulcimer, xylophone, tulnic
- Ovidiu Corodan - bass guitar
- Petrică Ionuţescu - flute, nai, kaval, tulnic
- OQ - guitars, vocals, keyboards
- Tibor Kati - vocals, guitars, keyboards, programming

=== Additional personnel ===
- Alexandrina - female vocals (track 6)
- Sakis Tolis - additional vocals (track 5)
- Rune Eriksen - guitars (track 6)
- Gabriel Almași - theremin (track 1)
- Mihai Neagoe - producer
- Mihai Neagoe - recording, mixing
