= Vîrstele pămîntului =

Studio album by Negură Bunget
- Released: March 31, 2010
- Recorded: Recorded at Negură Music studio between December 2009 – January 2010
- Genre: Progressive metal, black metal, avant-garde metal, folk metal
- Length: 1:06:13
- Label: Code666
- Producer: Mihai Toma

Negură Bunget chronology
Măiestrit (2010)	Vîrstele pămîntului (2010)	Tău (2015)

Vîrstele pămîntului is the fifth studio album by Negură Bunget, released on March 31, 2010, on the Code666 label, the same month as the re-recorded Măiestrit album. It was the first album recorded with a new line-up of musicians, after differences broke the original trio apart and the drummer, Negru, continued on with the band's name.

== Track listing ==
1. "Pămînt" – 06:58
2. "Dacia hiperboreană" – 08:52
3. "Umbra" – 03:31
4. "Ochiul inimii" – 08:04
5. "Chei de rouă" – 05:51
6. "Țara de dincolo de negură" – 05:54
7. "Jar" – 04:29
8. "Arborele lumii" – 07:37
9. "Întoarcerea amurgului" - 08:21
10. "Cumpăna" - 06:36 [bonus track on Code666 Records double vinyl only]

== Personnel ==
- Corb - vocals, guitars, dulcimer
- Negru - drums, percussion
- Spin - guitars
- Ageru Pământului - vocals, flute, kaval, nai, tulnic, percussion, xylophone
- Gădineț - bass guitar, nai
- Inia Dinia - keyboards

== Additional personnel ==
- Dan Florin Spataru (Encoilmark) – artwork, art direction, design, cover design, photography
- Mihai Toma - producer, mixing
