= 'N Crugu Bradului =

2002 concept album by Negură Bunget

Studio album by Negură Bunget
- Released: November 2002
- Recorded: June 18 – July 2, 2002
- Genres: Progressive metal, black metal, avant-garde metal, folk metal
- Length: 53:43
- Label: Code666
- Producers: Negura Bunget and Cristi Solomon

Negură Bunget chronology
Măiastru Sfetnic (2000)	'N Crugu Bradului (2002)	Negură Bunget Box (2004)

Professional ratings
Review scores
Source	Rating
AllMusic	4/5 stars

'N Crugu Bradului is a concept album by Negură Bunget, released by the Code666 label in 2002 in a digibook format, constructed manually by the members themselves and limited to 3,000 copies worldwide (the second pressing was in a regular jewel case CD). Each song represents a season. The album title translates to "Through the Depths of the Fir Tree Heights".

== Track listing ==
- All songs written by Negură Bunget.
1. "I (Primăvară)" – 12:11
2. "II (Vară)" – 13:21
3. "III (Toamnă)" – 15:12
4. "IIII (Iarnă)" – 12:56

Note: The words in brackets are the four seasons in Romanian, but they do not appear on any release. The official names are "I", "II", "III" and "IIII".

The multimedia portion of the disc also included the video for the track "Văzduh".

== Personnel ==
- Hupogrammos Disciple – guitars, vocals, keyboards, bass guitar, tulnic, nai
- Sol Faur – guitars
- Negru – drums, percussion, xylophone

=== Additional personnel ===
- Ursu – bass guitar

== Production ==
- Produced, engineered and mixed by Cristi Solomon and Negură Bunget
- Dan Florin Spataru – artwork, art direction, design, cover design, photography
