= OM (Negură Bunget album) =

Studio album by Negură Bunget
- Released: October 20, 2006
- Recorded: 2005–2006
- Studio: Negură Music Studio
- Genres: Progressive metal; black metal; avant-garde metal; folk metal
- Length: 67:13; 73:07 (Enucleation Records vinyl)
- Labels: Code666; Enucleation Records; Blood Music
- Producer: Negură Bunget

Negură Bunget chronology
Inarborat Kosmos (2005)	OM (2006)	Măiestrit (2010)

OM is a concept album by Negură Bunget, released on October 20, 2006, on the Code666 label. It was recorded in Negură Music Studio and produced, mixed and mastered by the band. A double LP of the album with a bonus track was released by Enucleation Records in 2008. Another double LP edition, remastered but without the bonus track, was released by Blood Music in 2014.

== Critical reception ==
Professional ratings
Review scores
Source	Rating
AllMusic	4.5/5 stars
Metalstorm	9.1/10

The album received wide critical acclaim from metal critics. Writing for AllMusic, Eduardo Rivadavia called OM the band's "opus" and cited its "breathtaking range and imagination", while Heathen Harvest's Conor Fynes said that the album "had one of the most original and otherworldly atmospheres ever committed to the black metal artform".

MetalStorm stated, "OM is nothing short of a masterpiece...A divine album with a unique style and its own trademark, this album is one of 2006's best efforts".

Sputnikmusic's Dean J. Brown gave OM a perfect 5 "classic" rating and retrospectively noted the album's major impact, saying, "Cinematic in its orchestration and flawless in its execution, Negură Bunget’s OM, at the time of its release, tore apart the confines of what constituted black metal and re-imagined it in line with the band's own morbid visions; which were entirely unique to their Romanian surroundings...It’s a masterpiece of art, not just music". He went on to list in the album among the black metal genre's most important records: "When the annals of black metal are finally written - [it] will sit at the pantheon alongside classics such as Darkthrone's Transilvanian Hunger, Mayhem's De Mysteriis Dom Sathanas and Emperor's In the Nightside Eclipse".

In 2013, Decibel ranked OM at number 78 on its list of the Top 100 Black Metal Albums of All Time.

== Track listing ==
- All songs written and arranged by Negură Bunget.

=== CD/2LP ===
1. "Ceasuri rele" – 3:07 ("Dark Hours")
2. "Țesarul de lumini" – 12:49 ("Weaver of Lights")
3. "Primul OM" – 4:22 ("The First Human")
4. "Cunoașterea tăcută" – 7:13 ("Silent Knowledge")
5. "Înarborat" – 6:22 ("Rooted")
6. "Dedesuptul" – 6:39 ("The Underneath")
7. "Norilor" – 3:00 ("Of the Clouds")
8. "De Piatră" – 5:36 ("Of Stone")
9. "Cel din urmă vis" – 10:04 ("The Last Dream")
10. "Hora soarelui" – 5:56 ("Sun's Circle Dance")
11. "Al doilea OM" – 2:04 ("The Second Human")
12. "Văzduh" – 5:58 ("Air") [bonus track on Enucleation Records vinyl only]

=== DVD (limited edition) ===
1. "Cunoașterea tăcută" – clip – (filmed in Retezat, Bucegi and Făgăraş Mountains)
2. "Norilor" – clip
3. "Primul om" – slideshow
4. "III" – live clip (filmed in Barossel)
5. "Văzduh" – clip (remixed/remastered) - (filmed in Apuseni Mountains)
6. "Bruiestru" – live in Studio Rock, Bucharest, May 2003
7. "IIII" – live in Zella-Mehlis, Shadow from the East Tour, April 2004
8. "Wordless Knowledge" – live in Munich, OM Tour, November 2005
9. "Negura Bunget" – interview, February 2006

== Personnel ==
- Hupogrammos Disciple – vocals, guitars, bass guitar, keyboards, synthesizers, nai, flute, tulnic
- Sol Faur – guitars, keyboards
- Drimus – pan pipes
- Ermit – bass guitar
- Negru – drums, percussion, xylophone, toacă

== Production ==
- Executive producer: Code666
- Produced, engineered, mixed and mastered by Negură Bunget at Negură Music Studio
- Dan Florin Spataru (Encoilmark) – artwork, art direction, design, cover design, photography
