= Echo (Of Mice & Men album) =

Studio album by Of Mice & Men
- Released: December 3, 2021
- Recorded: 2020
- Genre: Metalcore
- Length: 39:19
- Label: SharpTone
- Producer: Of Mice & Men

Of Mice & Men chronology
| Ad Infinitum (2021) | Echo (2021) | Tether (2023) |

Singles from Echo
- 1. "Obsolete" Released: January 13, 2021; 2. "Timeless" Released: February 10, 2021; 3. "Bloom" Released: April 21, 2021; 4. "Mosaic" Released: September 29, 2021; 5. "Fighting Gravity" Released: October 19, 2021; 6. "Echo" Released: November 24, 2021

Echo is the seventh studio album by American rock band Of Mice & Men. It was released on December 3, 2021, through SharpTone Records. The album was self-produced by the band and is the follow-up to the group's sixth album, Earthandsky (2019). It consists of three EPs released earlier in the year, Timeless, Bloom, and Ad Infinitum. It is their first album to be released after the band signed to SharpTone Records in 2021.

== Background and recording ==
The band recorded the album in 2020 during the COVID-19 pandemic and they worked remotely through Zoom and sharing files. The album was produced by the band themselves and mixed/mastered by lead vocalist Aaron Pauley.

== Release and promotion ==
The band announced that they parted ways with Rise Records and signed with SharpTone Records on January 13, 2021. On the same day, they released a new single "Obsolete" and announced that their debut EP, Timeless, would be released on February 26, 2021. Five days later, lead vocalist Aaron Pauley announced via Twitter that this would be the first of three EPs released in the year. On February 10, the band released the title track "Timeless". On April 21, the band announced that their second EP, Bloom, would be released on May 28, 2021. That same day, they unveiled a new single and title track "Bloom". On September 29, the band released a brand new single "Mosaic". On October 19, the band released the single "Fighting Gravity" and announced that their third EP, Ad Infinitum, was set for release on December 3, 2021. The band then confirmed the release of their seventh studio album, Echo, which was released along with the EP and compiles all three EPs that were released throughout the year. They also revealed the album cover and track list. On November 24, the band released the title track. In an interview, Aaron Pauley discussed what the album means to the band:

"Echo is a snapshot of the last year-and-a-half of our lives. It covers loss and growth, life and impermanence, love, and the infinite - how the most wonderful and most tragic parts of the human experience are deeply intertwined."

== Critical reception ==
Professional ratings
Review scores
| Source | Rating |
|---|---|
| Distorted Sound | 8/10 |
| Kerrang! | 3/5 |
| Rock 'N' Load | 10/10 |
| Sputnikmusic | 3/5 |

Echo received positive reviews from critics. Gema Mee of Distorted Sound stated that "For an album that has essentially been slowly released over the past 10 months, Echo is a worthy successor to Earthandsky, and when the world has returned to some sense of normality because we've paid for our sins and changed our ways, many of these tracks will bleed into Of Mice & Men's setlist regardless of having been written for the digital and isolated age." Mischa Pearlman of Kerrang! thought the album "[offered] something old, something new, and something very unexpected on final, composite part of EP trilogy…" Daniel Stapleton of Rock 'N' Load called the album a "truly brilliant piece of work," and praised the "crushing riffs" and songwriting.

== Track listing ==
All lyrics are written by Of Mice & Men; all music is composed by Of Mice & Men.

Echo track listing
| No. | Title | Length |
|---|---|---|
| 1. | "Timeless" | 4:06 |
| 2. | "Obsolete" | 4:25 |
| 3. | "Anchor" | 3:58 |
| 4. | "Levee" | 4:50 |
| 5. | "Bloom" | 4:17 |
| 6. | "Pulling Teeth" | 3:22 |
| 7. | "Mosaic" | 3:11 |
| 8. | "Fighting Gravity" | 4:56 |
| 9. | "Echo" | 3:19 |
| 10. | "Helplessly Hoping" (Crosby, Stills, Nash & Young cover) | 2:52 |
| Total length: | | 39:19 |

== Personnel ==
Credits adapted from The Rockpit.

Of Mice & Men

- Aaron Pauley – lead vocals, bass, mixing, mastering
- Alan Ashby – rhythm guitar, backing vocals
- Phil Manansala – lead guitar, backing vocals
- Valentino Arteaga – drums, percussion

Additional personnel

- Of Mice & Men – engineering, production
- Derek Hess – artwork
