= Măiestrit =

Re-recording of the 2000 album Măiastru Sfetnic by Negură Bunget

Studio album by Negură Bunget
- Released: March 15, 2010
- Recorded: Recorded at Consonance Studio, SOS Studio and Negura Music Studio. Produced and mixed at Consonance Studio.
- Genre: Progressive metal, black metal, avant-garde metal, folk metal
- Length: 1:13:25
- Label: Lupus Lounge/Prophecy Productions
- Producer: Negură Bunget

Negură Bunget chronology
| OM (2006) | Măiestrit (2010) | Vîrstele Pamîntului (2010) |

Măiestrit is a re-recording of the 2000 album Măiastru Sfetnic by Negură Bunget. Released on March 15, 2010, on Lupus Lounge/Prophecy Productions, it contained the last studio recordings of the band's classic line-up (Hupogrammos, Sol Faur, Negru). The album included previously unreleased acoustic material.

== Track listing ==
- All songs written and arranged by Negură Bunget.
1. "Vremea locului sortit" – 07:38
2. "În-zvîcnirea apusului" – 10:03
3. "A-vînt în abis" – 06:14
4. "Al locului" – 10:26
5. "Bruiestru" – 09:45
6. "Plecăciunea morții" – 11:12
7. "A-vînt în abis (Acoustic Version)" – 08:22
8. "Plecăciunea morții (Acoustic Version)" – 09:45

== Personnel ==
- Hupogrammos - vocals, guitars, keyboards
- Sol Faur - guitars
- Negru - drums

== Additional personnel ==
- Arioch - bass guitar, engineering
- Martin Koller - producer
- Hupogrammos - producer, engineering, mixing
- Sol Faur - producer, engineering, mixing
- Dan Florin Spataru (Encoilmark) – artwork, art direction, design, cover design, photography
- Dajana Winkel - photography
