= Negură Bunget =

Romanian black metal band

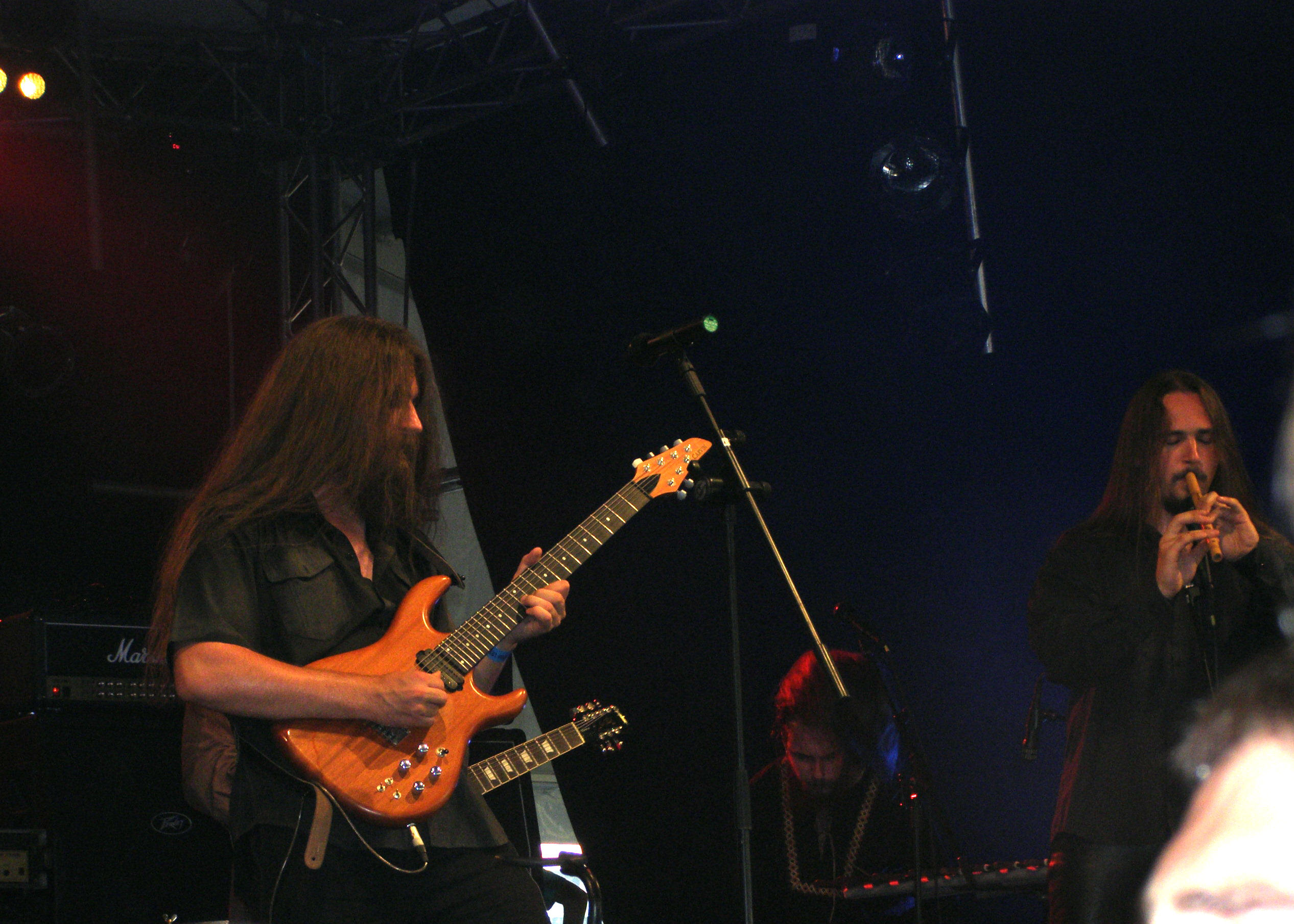

Background information
- Origin: Timișoara, Romania
- Genres: Black metal, folk metal
- Years active: 1994–2017, 2018–2021
- Labels: Bestial Records, Code666, Negura Music, Lupus Lounge/Prophecy Productions
- Members: (see members section)
- Website: negurabunget.com/

Negură Bunget was a black metal band from Timișoara, Romania, whose sound incorporated progressive metal and Romanian folk music.

== Biography ==
Negură Bunget formed at the end of 1994 as Wiccan Rede, a duo of drummer Negru (Gabriel Mafa) and Hupogrammos Disciple (Edmond Karban) on guitars, vocals, and keyboards. Both had been members of Makrothumia. Wiccan Rede released the 1995 demo From Transilvanian Forests before renaming to Negură Bunget. In a 2004 interview, Negru explained the name's symbolism,

Negură Bunget is a black fog coming from a deep dark dense forest. The name tries to picture somehow the kind of atmosphere, both musical and spiritual we'd want to create through our music. It has also an esoteric nature, standing for the inexpressible parts of our ideology. The two words are also from the Tracic substrate of the Romanian language (the oldest one, containing about 90 words) as the interest for our local history and spirituality is something of crucial importance and meaning for us as a band.

The band released debut album Zîrnindu-să in 1996. In 1997, guitarist Sol Faur (Cristian Popescu) joined the group. The trio released a demo, several EPs, and three more albums - Măiastru Sfetnic, 'N Crugu Bradului and OM.

The success of Măiastru Sfetnic (2000) led to a three-album contract with Code666. They reached a wider audience and toured Europe.

N Crugu Bradului (2002) included four songs spanning a total of nearly an hour. The band described the album as,

The 4th Negură Bunget phase… the principles of 4 (four). The natural form of the Universe to manifest itself (the four seasons, the four phases of the moon, the four moments of the day, the four winds, the four cardinal points, the four elements…). The principle of four is a form that needs to be activated, through the consciousness (the awakening of the conscience) moving towards contemplation, standing for the initiation though mystery.

In 2006, Negură Bunget released OM, garnering attention from extreme music press. It was ranked second best album of 2006 by Terrorizer Magazine.

Drummer Negru (also the chief editor of Central European ideological magazine Negura Music) began the side project Din Brad ("from the fir tree") in 2008. They released their first and, to date, only album Dor in 2012.

In 2009, Negură Bunget split due to irreconcilable differences. Hupogrammos and Sol Faur formed Dordeduh, while drummer Negru continued with Negură Bunget with several new lineups.

The band's first new album since the lineup change, 2010's Vîrstele Pămîntului, was released in a limited special edition. Each of the 555 copies, handmade to order, consisted of a wooden box containing genuine soil from Transylvania, a poster, pin, and a deluxe digipack edition of the CD.

Also in 2010, the band released Măiestrit, a rerecorded version of Măiastru Sfetnic. They released the EP Poarta De Dincolo in 2011, as well as ive DVD and album Focul Viu, recorded and filmed in Bucharest in January 2008 with the classic trio lineup and backing musicians.

Negru reshuffled the lineup again in 2013. He explained the band's structural arrangement,

At the very core there are some musicians who will be involved in all the projects of the band. To this we’ll add another layer of musicians who will join us just for special events and studio projects. This more flexible approach will allow us to increase the use of authentic traditional instruments adding new elements and to explore new musical territories, both live and in studio.

The band issued a two-song 7" single, "Gînd A-prins", in 2013.

Negură Bunget's sixth studio album, Tău, was announced in 2013 as the first part of a planned "Transylvanian Trilogy". It was released on 27 February 2015 by Prophecy Productions sublabel Lupus Lounge.

The band's seventh album, Zi, was released on 30 September 2016 by Lupus Lounge.

Negru died on 21 March 2017, aged 42, leaving the band without any original members and ending the group.

On 7 December 2018, the band announced that the third installment of the "Transylvanian Trilogy", left unfinished following Negru's death, would be completed and released at some point in 2019. With Negru's leftover drum tracks, the remaining members completed the album Zău and released it on November 26, 2021.

== Band members ==
=== Former members ===
- Negru (Gabriel Mafa) - drums, percussion (1995–2017), dulcimer, horns, xylophone (2002–2017) (died 2017)
- Hupogrammos Disciple (Edmond Karban) - vocals, guitar, bass, keyboards (1995–2009), flute, horns (2002–2009)
- Sol Faur (Cristian Popescu) - guitar, bass, keyboards, backing vocals (1998–2005, 2006–2009)
- Ageru Pământului - percussion, nai, flute, xylophone, archaic instruments, vocals (2009–2012)
- Inia Dinia - keyboards (2006–2013)
- Gadinet (Cătălin Motorga) - bass, nai, flute (2009–2013)
- Spin - guitar (2009–2010)
- Corb (Alex G. Mihai) - vocals, guitar, dulcimer (2009–2010)
- Urzit - guitar (2010–2013)
- Fulmineos - guitar, vocals (2010–2013)
- Chakravartin (Stefan Zaharescu)- vocals (2012–2013)
- Vartan Garabedian - percussion, vocals (2013–2016)
- Mtz (Mihai Neagoe) - sound design (2013–2016)
- Tibor Kati - vocals, guitar, keyboards, programming (2013–2017, 2018–2021)
- OQ (Adrian Neagoe) - guitar, vocals, keyboards (2013–2017, 2018–2021)
- Petrică Ionuţescu - nai, flute, horns (2013–2017, 2018–2021)
- Ovidiu Corodan - bass (2013–2017, 2018–2021)
- Daniel Dorobanţu - visual design (2013–2017, 2018–2021)

=== Former live members ===
- Trunks (Dumitrescu Ionuţ) - bass
- Diana Karban - keyboards
- Gabi Karban - keyboards, bass (1996–2007)
- Daniel Dorobanțu - keyboards (1997–1998)
- Ursu - bass (1999–2007)
- Necuratul - percussion (2000–2003)
- Andrei Popa - bass, guitar (2005)
- Iedera - keyboards (2005–2006)
- Alin Drimuș - nai, pipes, wooden flute (2006)
- Arioch - bass (2007–2009)
- Olivian Mihalcea - guitar, nai, wooden flute, pipes (2016)

== Discography ==
=== Studio albums ===
- Zîrnindu-să (1996)
- Măiastru Sfetnic (2000)
- 'N Crugu Bradului (2002)
- OM (2006)
- Măiestrit (2010) (re-recording of Măiastru Sfetnic)
- Vîrstele Pamîntului (2010)
- Tău (2015)
- Zi (2016)
- Zău (2021)

=== Singles and EPs ===
- Sala Molksa (1998)
- Inarborat Kosmos (2005)
- Poarta de Dincolo (2011)
- Gînd A-prins (2013)

=== Demos ===
- From Transilvanian Forest as Wiccan Rede (1995)

=== Live albums ===
- Focul Viu (2011)

=== Box sets ===
- Negură Bunget Box (2004)
