= Zi (album) =

Studio album by Negură Bunget
- Released: September 30, 2016
- Studio: Negură Music Studio
- Genres: Progressive metal, black metal, avant-garde metal, folk metal
- Length: 48:48
- Label: Lupus Lounge/Prophecy Productions
- Producer: Mihai Neagoe

Negură Bunget chronology
| Tău (2015) | Zi (2016) | Zău (2021) |

Zi is the seventh studio album by Negură Bunget, released on September 30, 2016, by Lupus Lounge, a sub-label of Prophecy Productions.

== Track listing ==
| No. | Title | Length |
|---|---|---|
| 1. | "Tul-ni-că-rînd" | 5:56 |
| 2. | "Grădina stelelor" | 8:32 |
| 3. | "Brazdă dă foc" | 9:11 |
| 4. | "Baciu moșneag" | 8:25 |
| 5. | "Stanciu Gruiul" | 5:20 |
| 6. | "Marea cea mare" | 11:24 |
| Total length: | | 48:48 |

== Personnel ==
Negură Bunget

- Negru – drums, percussion, dulcimer, tulnic
- Ovidiu Corodan – bass
- Petrică Ionuţescu – flute, nai, kaval, tulnic
- Adi "OQ" Neagoe – guitars, vocals, keyboards
- Tibor Kati – vocals, guitars, keyboards, programming

Other staff

- Alin Luculescu – mastering
- Anita Ramona – design
- Daniel Dorobanțu – cover art
- Mihai Neagoe – mixing, producer
