= Zîrnindu-să =

Studio album by Negură Bunget
- Released: November 1996
- Recorded: October 1996 at Magic Sound Studio in Bucharest
- Genre: Progressive metal, black metal
- Length: 37:27
- Label: Bestial Records (cassette); Breath of Night Records (CD); Darkland Records (CD)
- Producer: Cristi Solomon

Negură Bunget chronology
From Transilvanian Forests (1995)	Zîrnindu-să (1996)	Sala Molksa (1998)

Zîrnindu-să is Negură Bunget's first album, recorded in only 20 hours at Magic Sound Studio in Bucharest. First released on cassette in 1996 by the Romanian label Bestial Records, it has been reissued three times: in 1998 on CD (a limited edition of 500) by the American label Breath of Night Records, in 2003 on vinyl (also a limited edition of 500) on Darkland Records, and in 2004 as part of the band's Negură Bunget Box set. All of the reissues were remastered. A 2008 version of the album was also remastered and includes an older recording of the entire album.

== Track listing ==
1. "Blăznit" – 4:30
2. "Negrii" – 5:42
3. "În Miaz Dă Negru" – 4:15
4. "Dîn Afundul Adîncului Întrupat" – 5:33
5. "Pohvala Hulă" – 5:22
6. "De Rece Sîngie" – 3:49
7. "Dupre Reci Îmbre" – 4:02
8. "Vel Proclet" – 4:14

== Personnel ==
- Hupogrammos Disciple – guitars, vocals, bass guitar, keyboards
- Negru – drums, percussion
