= Abiotic (band) =

American deathcore band

- Origin: Miami, Florida, U.S.
- Genres: Deathcore, technical death metal, progressive metal
- Years active: 2010–2016, 2018–present
- Labels: The Artisan Era, Metal Blade
- Members: Matt Mendez; Johnathan Matos; Travis Bartosek; Killan Duarte; Anthony Lusk-Simone
- Past members: Alex Vasquez; Andres Hurtado; Ray Jimenez; Dickie Allen; Brent Phillips; Aaron Stechauner

Abiotic is an American deathcore band from Miami formed in 2010. The band released two full-length albums on Metal Blade Records, Symbiosis in 2012 and Casuistry in 2015. The band broke up in 2016, citing financial issues and internal problems within the group as reasons for the breakup. In 2018, the band reunited, and in 2019, released a new single: "Emerald". In 2021 they released their third studio album, Ikigai, through independent label The Artisan Era.

== Members ==
Current members

- Matt Mendez – guitar (2010–2016, 2018–present)
- Johnathon Matos – guitar (2010–2016, 2018–present)
- Travis Bartosek – vocals (2014–2016, 2018–present)
- Killan Duarte – bass (2018–present)
- Anthony Lusk-Simone – drums (2019–present)

Past members

- Alex Vasquez – bass (2010–2016)
- Andres Hurtado – drums (2010–2013)
- Ray Jiminez – vocals (2010–2013)
- Brent Phillips – drums (2014–2016)
- Aaron Stechauner – drums (2013–2014, 2018)

Past live musicians

- Dickie Allen – vocals (2013–2014)
- Matthew Paulazzo – drums (2016)

== Discography ==
Studio albums

- Symbiosis (2012, Metal Blade)
- Casuistry (2015, Metal Blade)
- Ikigai (2021, The Artisan Era)

EPs

- A Universal Plague (2011, self-released)

Singles

- "Emerald" (2019)
- "Ocean of Worldly Suffering" (feat. Matthew Kiichi Heafy) (2023)
