= Awakening from Dukkha =

Compilation album by Nine Treasures
- Released: 19 March 2021
- Recorded: Spectre Studios; Tacoma, Washington
- Genre: Folk metal
- Length: 49:25
- Language: Mongolian
- Label: Self-released
- Producer: Askhan

Nine Treasures chronology
Wisdom Eyes (2017)	Awakening from Dukkha (2021)	Seeking the Absolute (2025)

Awakening from Dukkha is the first compilation album by the Chinese folk metal band Nine Treasures. The album was self-released on 19 March 2021. It is a compilation of re-recordings of old songs from their first three studio albums. It is also the last album to have founding member Tsog on morin khuur and the first to feature drummer Namra.

== Background ==
Nine Treasures had been unsatisfied with the recording quality of their previous albums, and opted to re-record songs from all three of their previous albums for the new album Awakening from Dukkha which would be released in March 2021. Askhan expressed a wish for a new beginning for the band, similar to Pantera. Askhan stated that he would begin writing new material after the album's release in March 2021. With the new album forthcoming, the band removed all of their previous releases from the internet, feeling "ashamed" of their quality. The band subsequently made all of their releases available as free wave file downloads.

== Reception ==
Awakening from Dukkha received positive reviews from critics. The album was reviewed by Metal Hammer and received a rating of 9/10. Laura McCarthy of Distorted Sound gave it a score of 7/10, calling it "a collection that takes the top tier music that the band have produced and blended them together superbly."

== Track listing ==
All tracks are written by Askhan.

No.	Title	Original Album	Length
1.	"Black Heart"	Nine Treasures	3:46
2.	"Arvan Ald Guulin Honshoor"	Arvan Ald Guulin Honshoor	4:00
3.	"Fable of Mangas"	Nine Treasures	4:57
4.	"Nomin Dalai"	Arvan Ald Guulin Honshoor	2:47
5.	"Tes River's Hymn"	Nine Treasures	3:52
6.	"Ten Years"	Wisdom Eyes	4:44
7.	"The Dream About Ancient City"	Nine Treasures	3:54
8.	"Praise for Fine Horse"	Nine Treasures	3:55
9.	"The End of the World"	Wisdom Eyes	3:26
10.	"Wisdom Eyes"	Wisdom Eyes	3:22
11.	"The Stubborn"	Wisdom Eyes	4:43
12.	"Three Years Old Warrior"	Nine Treasures	4:44
Total length:			49:25

== Credits ==
=== Personnel ===
Nine Treasures

- Askhan – guitars, vocals, production, mixing
- Tsog – morin khuur
- Orgil – bass
- Saina – balalaika
- Namra – drums
