= Las Cruces (band) =

- Origin: San Antonio, Texas
- Genres: Doom metal
- Years active: 1994-present
- Label: Grim Alley Records
- Members: George Trevino; Mando Tovar; Jimmy Bell; Jason Kane
- Past members: Gabe Lara; Mark Zamarron; Paul DeLeon; Art Cansino

Las Cruces is a doom metal band from San Antonio, Texas. George Trevino formed the band in 1994 with members of his previous bands, Sound Asylum and Legion. The band has undergone several lineup changes but has maintained its current lineup since 2009. In 1995, John Perez of Solitude Aeturnus saw Las Cruces perform as a local support act while Solitude Aeturnus was touring with King Diamond. Following the performance, Perez signed the band to his label, Brainticket Records. Las Cruces has subsequently performed as an opening act for bands including Overkill, King Diamond, Trouble, Cathedral, and Kyuss, and appeared at the Hell's Heroes Festival in 2025.

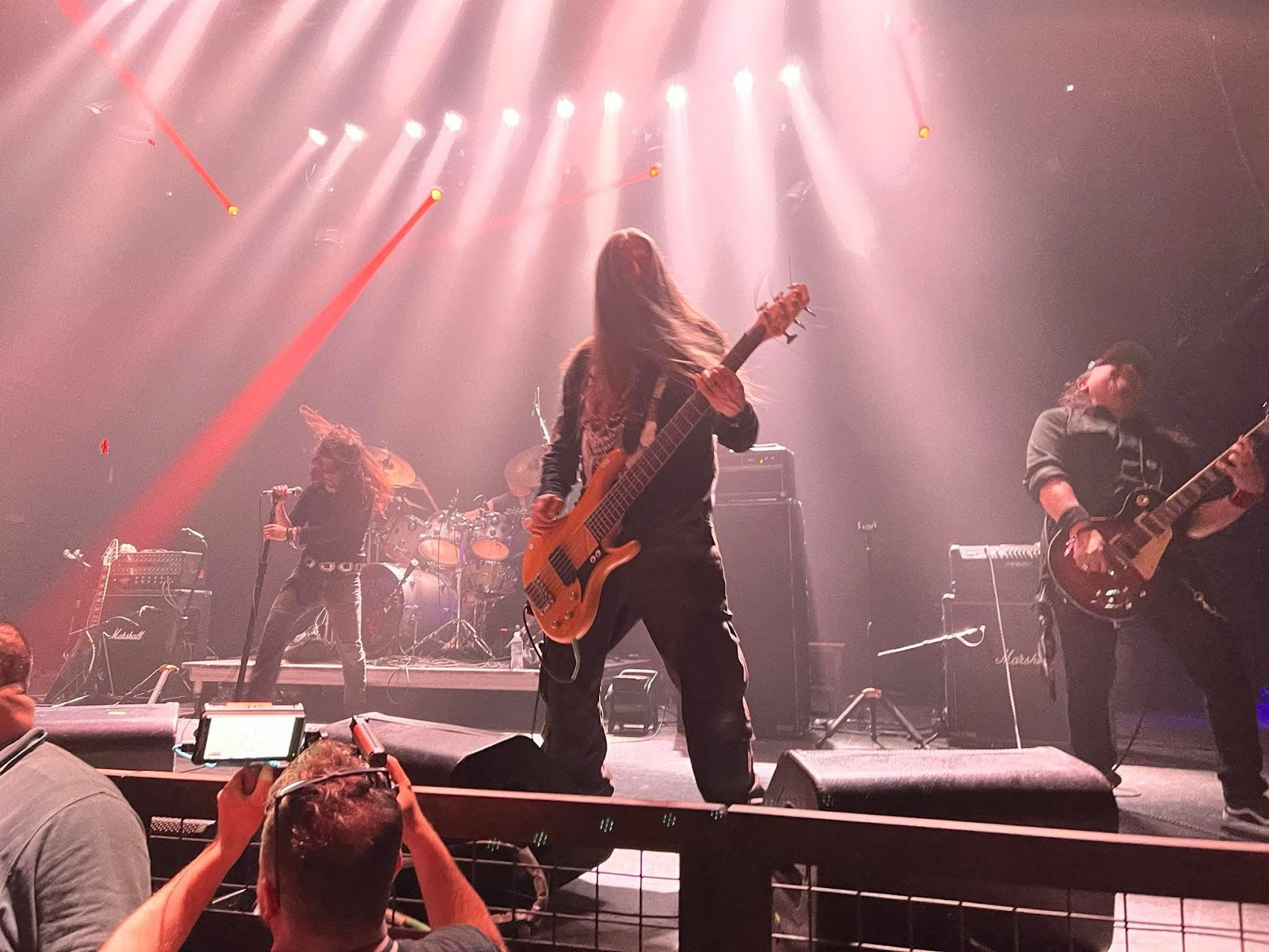
Las Cruces Live at Hell's Heroes

== Discography ==
- S.O.L. (1996) - Brainticket Records
- Ringmaster (1998) - Brainticket Records
- Stone Deaf Forever (single: "Farewell") (1999) - Red Sun Records
- Slave to the Power (single: "The Prisoner") (1999) - Meteorcity Records
- I am Vengeance soundtrack (single: "In My Sadness") (1999) - Meteorcity Records
- Lowest End EP (2001) - Cross Eyed Records
- Dusk (2010) - Brainticket Records
- Cosmic Tears (2022) - Ripple Records
