= Ad Infinitum (EP) =

EP by Of Mice & Men
- Released: December 3, 2021
- Recorded: 2020
- Genre: Metalcore
- Length: 14:18
- Label: SharpTone
- Producer: Of Mice & Men

Of Mice & Men chronology
Bloom (2021)	Ad Infinitum (2021)	Echo (2021)

Singles from Ad Infinitum
- 1. "Mosaic" Released: September 29, 2021; 2. "Fighting Gravity" Released: October 19, 2021; 3. "Echo" Released: November 24, 2021

Ad Infinitum is the third EP by American rock band Of Mice & Men. It was released on December 3, 2021, through SharpTone Records. The EP was produced by the band themselves and it is the follow-up to the group's second EP, Bloom (2021). It is the third part of their so called "EP Trilogy".

== Background and promotion ==
On September 29, 2021, four months after the band's second EP release, they unveiled a new single "Mosaic". On October 19, the band released the single "Fighting Gravity" while also announced the EP itself, the EP cover, the track list, and release date. This would be the third of three EPs released in the year. The group also surprise announced their upcoming seventh studio album, Echo, which will be released along with the EP and will compile all three EPs. On November 24, one week before the EP release, the band unveiled the third single "Echo".

== Track listing ==
No.	Title	Length
1.	"Mosaic"	3:11
2.	"Fighting Gravity"	4:56
3.	"Echo"	3:19
4.	"Helplessly Hoping" (Crosby, Stills, Nash & Young cover)	2:52
Total length:		14:18

== Personnel ==
Of Mice & Men

- Aaron Pauley – lead vocals, bass, mixing, mastering
- Alan Ashby – rhythm guitar, backing vocals
- Phil Manansala – lead guitar, backing vocals
- Valentino Arteaga – drums, percussion

Additional personnel

- Of Mice & Men – engineering, production
- Derek Hess – artwork
