= Hollow (band) =

Swedish metal band

- Origin: Umeå, Sweden
- Genres: Power metal; progressive metal
- Years active: 199?–1999; 2018–present
- Labels: Nuclear Blast; Metal Mind; Rockshots
- Members: Andreas Stoltz
- Past members: Thomas Nilsson; Marcus Bigren; Urban Vikström

Hollow were a Swedish progressive power metal band from Umeå that later became a solo project for its founder, singer and guitarist Andreas Stoltz. Active from the early 1990s until 1999 and again since 2019, the project has issued four studio albums to date.

== History ==
The band was formed in the Swedish town of Umeå in the early 1990s by Andreas Stoltz (vocals, guitars), Marcus Bigren (guitars), Tomas Nilsson (bass), and Urban Vikstrom (drums), and they were initially called Vaalkyrian. They eventually changed their name to Hollow, and in 1995, they released a six-track demo titled Speak to Me. It was followed by a self-titled EP in 1997, and the same year, the band published their first full-length album, Modern Cathedral, which exhibited influences from Queensrÿche, Crimson Glory, and Elegy. They were subsequently offered a contract by the German label Nuclear Blast Records, which reissued the album a year later, with a new cover.

In 1999, Hollow released their second record, Architect of the Mind, a concept album on the topic of artificial intelligence. That year, the band toured Norway along with the progressive metal band Divided Multitude. Following the tour, Hollow split up. Stoltz kept the project alive, however, occasionally releasing songs online.

In 2019, following a 20-year gap, Hollow, still consisting only of Stoltz, issued a new full-length album, titled Between Eternities of Darkness. The release mentioned a drummer named Stalder Santoz, though this may be merely an anagram for Andreas Stoltz. The album was followed in 2021 by Tower.

== Band members ==
Current

- Andreas Stoltz – vocals, guitars (199?–1999); all instruments (2018–present)

Past

- Thomas Nilsson – bass (199?–1999)
- Urban Vikström – drums (199?–1999)
- Marcus Bigren – guitars (199?–1999)

== Discography ==
- Speak to Me (demo, 1995)
- Hollow (EP, 1997)
- Modern Cathedral (1997)
- Architect of the Mind (1999)
- Between Eternities of Darkness (2019)
- Tower (2021)
