= Zău =

Studio album by Negură Bunget
- Released: 26 November 2021
- Studio: Negură Music Studio
- Genres: Progressive metal, black metal, folk metal
- Length: 50:58
- Label: Lupus Lounge/Prophecy Productions
- Producer: Negură Bunget

Negură Bunget chronology
Zi (2016)	Zău (2021)

Zău is the eighth and final studio album by the Romanian black metal band Negură Bunget, released on 26 November 2021, by Lupus Lounge, a sublabel of Prophecy Productions. It is the third and final installment of the "Transylvanian Trilogy" and was released after the death of Negru.

== Background and recording ==
Negură Bunget released their seventh album, Zi on 30 September 2016 as the second part of the "Transylvanian Trilogy". Shortly afterward, Negru died on 21 March 2017, at the age of 42. With Negru's leftover drum tracks, the remaining members completed the band's eighth and final studio album Zău and released it on 26 November 2021.

== Critical reception ==
Professional ratings
Review scores
Source	Rating
Angry Metal Guy	3.5/5
Metal Hammer	4.5/7
metal1.info	8/10

Robert Müller of the German version of Metal Hammer gave Zău four and a half out of seven, stating that "it wasn't artificial intelligence that was needed to make (this album), but compassion and respect. Under these contitions, Zău succeeds. It really does sound like a memory translated into sound that travels from this world into vast nothingness. It is very cautious, gradually fading away, and it is also made of Carpatian folk music and cotton-wool wallpaper riffs." Moritz Grütz of the website Metal1.info gave the album eight out of ten, stating that the songs "oscillate between ambient music inspired by mysterious nature and melancholic black metal."

== Track listing ==
All tracks are written by Gabriel Mafa

No.	Title	Length
1.	"Brad"	15:53
2.	"Iarba Fiarelor"	8:29
3.	"Obrăzar"	6:58
4.	"Tinerețe Fără Bătrânețe"	7:59
5.	"Toacă Din Cer"	11:39
Total length:		50:58

== Personnel ==
Credits adapted from album liner notes.

Negură Bunget

- Gabriel "Negru" Mafa – drums, percussion
- Petrică Ionuţescu – pan flute, kaval, bucium, duduk, horn, pipe, whistle, keyboards
- Adi "OQ" Neagoe – guitars, keyboards
- Tibor Kati – vocals

Additional musicians

- Manuela Marchis – vocals (on the song "Brad")

Other staff

- Attila Lukinich – mixing, mastering
- Daniel Dorobanțu – executive producer, graphic/visual design
- Jonathan Selzer – liner notes, English translation
