= Nine Treasures =

Mongolian folk metal group

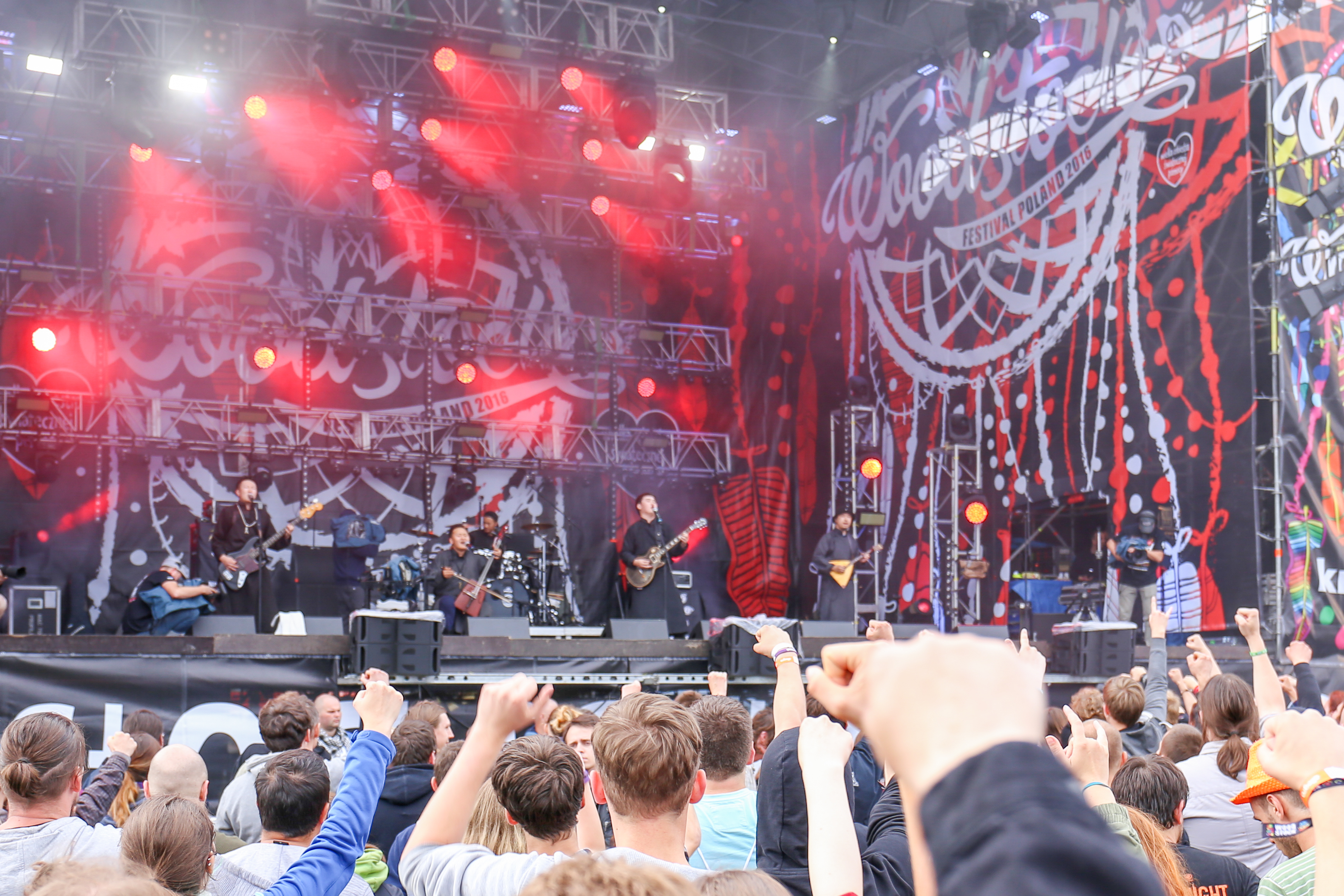
- Nine Treasures at Woodstock 2016 in Poland

Background information
- Origin: Inner Mongolia, China
- Genres: Folk metal, Heavy metal
- Years active: 2010–present
- Label: Independent
- Members: Askhan; Orgil; Saina; Namra; Nars
- Past members: Baisal; Alen; Ding Kai; Wiils; Tsog
- Website: ninetreasures.net

Nine Treasures (Chinese: 九宝 or 九大圣器; pinyin: jiǔ bǎo or jiǔ dà shèng qì) is a Inner Mongolian folk metal group with members mostly from the autonomous region of Inner Mongolia in China. Founded in 2010, the group combines traditional Mongolian music with heavy metal, notably using traditional instruments and overtone singing techniques.

== History ==
=== Origin ===
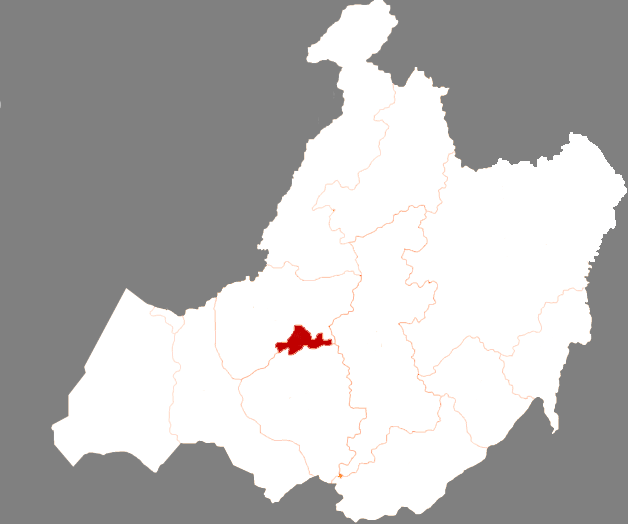
Hailar district in Hulunbuir region of Inner Mongolia

The group was formed in 2010 in Hailar District of Inner Mongolia in China.

The name of the group refers to the nine materials evoked in ancient Mongolian poems as favoring luck (gold, silver, bronze, iron, agate, amber, jade, pearl and coral). The name was proposed by a former member of the group who currently plays in the group Hanggai; the group considers the name auspicious.

In May 2012, the band released their first album 十丈铜嘴 Arvan Ald Guulin Honshoor at Mort Productions Beijing, an extreme metal record label created in 2001 and located in Shijingshan District, China. The album was reissued in 2015 under the title Arvan Ald Guulin Hunshoor for easy export. The reissue was done independently through Bandcamp.

=== International breakthrough ===
In August 2013, the group made a notable appearance at the Wacken Open Air festival where it won the Wacken Metal Battle in China and came second in the Wacken Metal Battle. In December of that year the group released their second work Nine Treasures under an independent label.

During 2014 and 2015, the group spent most of their time on the road for an Asian tour, traveling north to Ulaanbaatar in Mongolia, south to Taiwan, and east to Vladivostok in Russia.

In January 2015 they released their first EP titled Galloping White Horse, produced independently with two new songs and three live tracks. A few days later they released their first live album entitled Live in Beijing recorded from a concert in Beijing a few months before. This album contained the same live tracks as those included in the EP. In October of that year, the group was invited to WOMEX in Budapest and then went on tour in Europe for the first time, performing in the Czech Republic, Poland, Latvia, Germany, Denmark, the Netherlands, and Austria.

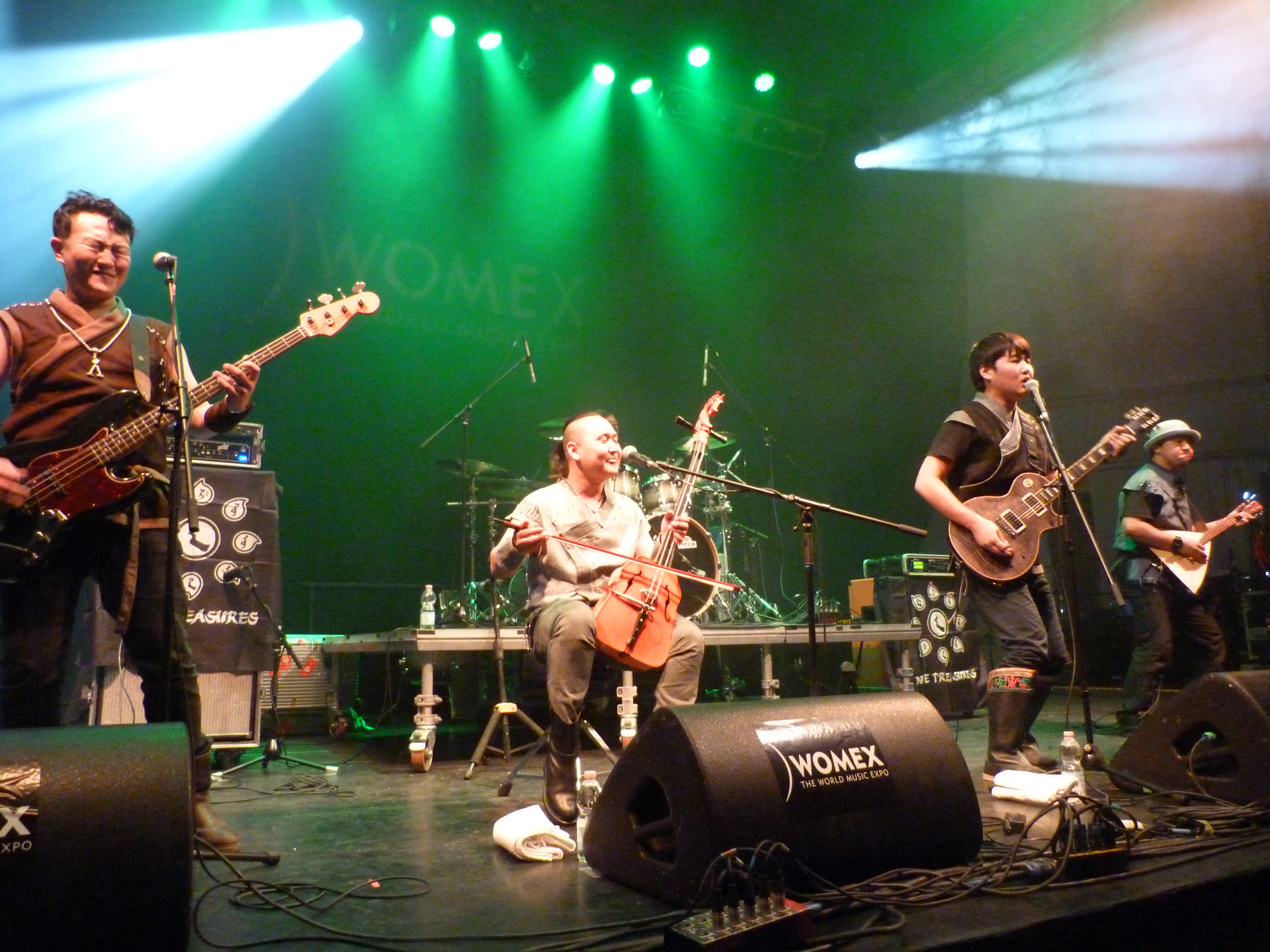
Nine Treasures at WOMEX 2015

In July 2016, Nine Treasures completed their second tour in Europe, visiting Latvia, Poland, Austria, the Czech Republic, Germany, the Netherlands, Portugal, and Slovenia.

In January 2017, the band released their third album titled Wisdom Eyes. It is distributed independently like their other albums on the platform Bandcamp. The band went on tour in Europe between June and July through Austria, Slovenia, Poland, the Czech Republic, Germany, Bulgaria, and Hungary.

Drummer Namra replaced Ding Kai in 2019. Nine Treasures released the single "Bodhicitta" on 27 February 2019.

=== Rebirth ===
The band were unsatisfied with the recording quality of their previous albums, and opted to re-record songs from all three of their previous albums for the new album Awakening from Dukkha which was released on 19 March 2021. Askhan expressed a wish for a new beginning for the band, similar to Pantera. Askhan stated that he would begin writing new material after the album's release in March 2021. With the new album forthcoming, the band removed all of their previous releases from the internet, feeling "ashamed" of their quality. The band subsequently made all of their releases available as free wave file downloads.

Awakening from Dukkha was reviewed by Metal Hammer and received a rating of 9/10.

== Music and lyrics ==
The group creates a fusion between heavy metal and traditional Mongolian music by introducing specific sounds related to the use of traditional instruments such as the morin khuur, the Russian balalaika, or the Jaw harp.

The music genre can vary from folk to folk rock to folk metal.

The lyrics of the songs evoke Mongolian nature, history, tales, legends and mythologies (especially those of Tengri, the chief Mongolian deity). The lyricist of the group, Askhan, also draws on family stories in some songs.

According to Askhan, while the first album is quite raw with no frills, the following are more mature and better worked with sequences, transitions and integration of traditional instruments.

The lyrics are written in Mongolian even when the titles are in English.

The group also uses techniques of Tuvan throat singing.

== Members ==
=== Current ===
- Askhan Avagchuud [阿斯汗] – guitars, vocals (2010–present), balalaika (2010–2015), drum programming (2010–2019), tovshuur (2023–present), MPC One (2025–present)
- Orgil [敖瑞峰] – bass, backing vocals (2011–present)
- Saina [赛娜] (also of M-Survivor) – balalaika, backing vocals (2015–present), guitars (2019–present)
- Namra – drums (2019–present)
- Nars – morin khuur, backing vocals (2023–present)

=== Former ===
- Baisal [白斯樂] (also on Suld as Baisile) – drums (2010–2011)
- Alen [艾伦] (also on Hanggai as Allen) – balalaika (2010–2012)
- 萨其尔 – samples (2012, only live)
- Wiils [伟力斯] – balalaika (2012–2014)
- Ding Kai [丁凯] (also on Tengger Cavalry) – drums (2012–2019)
- Tsog [朝克] – morin khuur, mouth harp, backing vocals (2010–2022)

== Discography ==
Studio albums

- 十丈铜嘴 Arvan Ald Guulin Honshoor (2012)
- Nine Treasures (2013)
- Wisdom Eyes (2017)
- Awakening from Dukkha (Compilation) (2021)
- Seeking the Absolute (2025)

Live albums

- Live in Beijing (2015)

Singles and EPs

- Galloping White Horse (EP, 2015)
- "Bodhicitta" (2019)
- "Three-Year-Old Warrior" (2021)
