= Dragony =

Austrian metal band

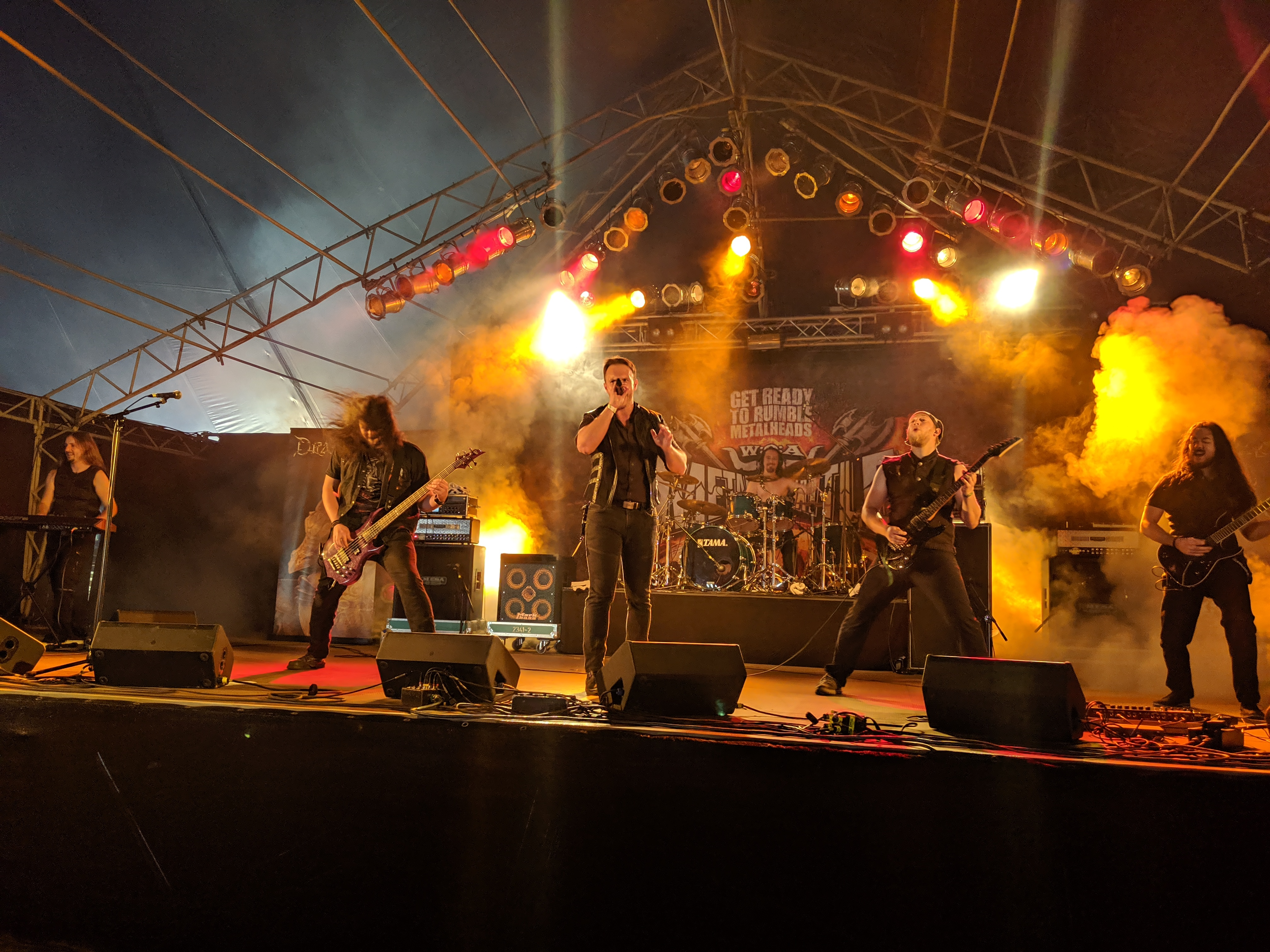

Background information
- Origin: Vienna, Austria
- Genres: Power metal, symphonic metal
- Years active: 2007-present
- Members: Siegfried "The Dragonslayer" Samer; Mat Plekhanov; Simon Saito; Chris Auckenthaler; Herbert Glos; Manuel Hartleb; Maria Nesh
- Past members: Daniel Stockinger; Georg Lorenz; Andreas Poppernitsch; Frederic Brünner
- Website: www.dragony.net

Dragony is a power metal band from Vienna, Austria, which incorporates elements of symphonic metal in their style.

== History ==
=== First steps ===
Dragony was founded in 2007 by guitarist Daniel Stockinger and lead vocalist Siegfried Samer. Originally conceived as a studio rock opera project and accordingly named The Dragonslayer Project, the project quickly evolved into a full band when new members Andreas Poppernitsch (guitars), Georg Lorenz (keyboards), Frederic Brünner (drums) and Herbert Glos (Bass) joined the group.

After playing several smaller shows on the Austrian circuit, the band soon played their first support shows for international acts such as Firewind and Paul Di'Anno. The band continued to play live throughout 2009 and 2010, sharing the stage with renowned Melodic Metal acts such as Serenity, Axxis, Edenbridge and Sonata Arctica.

=== Name change and debut album Legends ===
In 2010, work on the debut album began, and production of the debut "Legends", featuring contributions from many stars from the Austrian and international scene such as Thomas Buchberger of Serenity and Ralf Scheepers of Primal Fear, was finally completed in late 2011. In order to better promote the album, the band dropped the long The Dragonslayer Project name, and switched to the shorter Dragony.

In early 2012, Dragony signed a record deal with the German label Limb Music, and Legends was finally released on June 22, 2012, in Europe; a Japan release would follow on August 8, and a release in the US on August 14, 2012.

The debut album received mostly very favourable reviews, with the renowned German Metal Hammer magazine awarding 6 out of 7 points, and German Legacy magazine rating the album with 10 out of 15 points.

In 2012, the band returned to performing live, promoting and appearing as a local support at Primal Fear's and Brainstorm's Metal Nation 2012 tour, and playing their first festival gig at Metalfest Austria.

=== Lineup changes and second album Shadowplay ===
Founding members Daniel Stockinger (guitars) and Georg Lorenz (keyboards) left the band in summer 2012.

In fall 2012, Dragony celebrated its fifth anniversary with a show headlined by German power metallers Freedom Call in Vienna.

In late 2012, Simon Saito (guitars) and Manuel Hartleb (keyboards) were announced as new permanent members of the band.

On July 3, 2015, Dragony published a first promotional video for the upcoming album, an 80s metal cover version of True Survivor by David Hasselhoff from the Kung Fury movie soundtrack.

In early August 2015, it was announced that Dragony would be supporting German metal band Gamma Ray and Serious Black as opening act on their 25 Years In Metal tour on several dates in Europe in October and November 2015.

On August 28, 2015, the band released a lyric video to the new, Game Of Thrones-themed song Wolves Of The North on YouTube.

The band's second album, Shadowplay, was released on September 28, 2015, in Europe and November 20th 2015 in the US, and was again met with mostly favorable reviews.

In addition to the tour that saw the band open up for Gamma Ray and Serious Black at shows in Germany, the Czech Republic, Slovakia, Hungary and Austria, Dragony also appeared at several festivals in 2016 to promote the second album, notably Austria's largest festivals, the Nova Rock, opening for Twisted Sister, and the Donauinselfest, where they headlined the metal stage on 26 June 2016.

=== Lords Of The Hunt and Masters Of The Multiverse ===
In February 2017, the band announced the release of an EP to celebrate the band's 10th anniversary. The EP, titled Lords Of The Hunt, was released on April 7, 2017.

In October 2017, the band launched a crowdfunding campaign for the production of their third studio album, set for a release in 2018.

After summer shows in 2018 together with Battle Beast and at Masters of Rock festival in Czechia, the third album Masters of the Multiverse was officially announced on 31 August 2018, with a release scheduled for 12 October 2018.

On 12 September 2018 the band published a video for If It Bleeds We Can Kill It as the first single of the album. A lyrics video was released for the second single Flame of Tar Valon on 21 September 2018, and Defenders was released as the third single on 4 October 2018.

To promote the new album, Dragony joined Austrian Symphonic Metal acts Serenity and Visions of Atlantis on the Symphonic Metal Nights IV tour in the fall of 2018, which featured shows in Austria, Germany, the Netherlands, Switzerland, Italy, France and Hungary.

On 29 January 2019, it was announced that Dragony would be part of the 70.000 Tons of Metal cruise in 2019, and the band also appeared at Wacken Open Air that year.

=== Signing with Napalm Records and Viribus Unitis ===
After another crowdfunding campaign in support of their fourth album, it was announced on June 29, 2020, that Dragony had signed a new worldwide record deal with Austrian label Napalm Records.

The album, titled Viribus Unitis, was released on 15 January 2021 via Napalm Records.

The release of Viribus Unitis marked the first entry into official album charts for the band, peaking at number 73 in the Austrian Top 100 album charts and number 97 in the Swiss album charts.

In March 2022, Dragony announced the departure of founding member Andreas Poppernitsch due to increasing commitments outside the band. Shortly thereafter, Mat Plekhanov was announced as new guitarist.

Viribus Unitis earned Dragony a nomination for the Amadeus Austrian Music Award 2022, Austria's foremost music award, in the "Hard & Heavy" category.

=== Signing with SPV and fifth album Hic Svnt Dracones ===
In April 2024, the band announced the signing of a new label deal with SPV Steamhammer in respect of the release of their fifth studio album.

On July 26, 2024, the band released a music video for the new song Beyond the Rainbow Bridge, the first single of the upcoming album. The two singles Dragon of the Sea (Sic Parvis Magna) and Twilight of the Gods followed, before the band's fifth studio album, titled Hic Svnt Dracones (Latin for "Here be dragons"), was released on October 11, 2024. The album entered the Austrian album charts at number 33.

In 2025 singer Maria Nesh was added as a permanent member.

== Discography ==
=== Studio albums ===
- 2012: Legends (Limb Music)
- 2015: Shadowplay (Limb Music)
- 2018: Masters of the Multiverse (Limb Music)
- 2021: Viribus Unitis (Napalm Records)
- 2024: Hic Svnt Dracones (SPV Steamhammer)

=== Other albums ===
- 2017: Lords of the Hunt (EP, Limb Music)
