= Viribus Unitis (Dragony album) =

Studio album by Dragony
- Released: 15 January 2021
- Genre: Power metal; symphonic metal
- Length: 49:15
- Label: Napalm Records

Dragony chronology
Masters of the Multiverse (2018)	Viribus Unitis (2021)	Hic Svnt Dracones (2024)

Viribus Unitis is the fourth studio album by the Austrian power metal band Dragony. It was released on 15 January 2021 via Napalm Records.

== Background ==
After another crowdfunding campaign in support of their fourth album, it was announced on 29 June 2020, that Dragony had signed a new worldwide record deal with Austrian label Napalm Records.

In March 2022, Dragony announced the departure of founding member Andreas Poppernitsch due to increasing commitments outside the band. Viribus Unitis is thus the last studio album to feature Poppernitsch on guitar.

== Commercial performance ==
The release of Viribus Unitis marked the first entry into official album charts for the band, peaking at number 73 in the Austrian Top 100 album charts and number 97 in the Swiss album charts.

Viribus Unitis earned Dragony a nomination for the Amadeus Austrian Music Award 2022, Austria's foremost music award, in the "Hard & Heavy" category.

== Track listing ==
No.	Title	Length
1.	"On the Blue Danube" (instrumental)	1:23
2.	"Gods of War"	3:36
3.	"Love You to Death"	5:12
4.	"Magic"	3:51
5.	"Darkness Within"	4:29
6.	"A.E.I.O.U."	4:38
7.	"Viribus Unitis"	3:43
8.	"Golden Dawn"	4:40
9.	"Made of Metal (Cyberpunk Joseph)"	4:29
10.	"Battle Royale"	6:09
11.	"Legends Never Die"	3:43
12.	"Haben Sie Wien schon bei Nacht gesehn?" (Rainhard Fendrich cover)	3:22
Total length:		49:15

== Personnel ==
Dragony

- Siegfried Samer – vocals (lead), songwriting (tracks 3, 4, 6 to 11)
- Andreas Poppernitsch – guitars
- Simon Saito – guitars
- Manuel Hartleb – keyboards, songwriting (tracks 4, 9)
- Herbert Glos – bass
- Frederic Brünner – drums
