= Bloom (Of Mice & Men EP) =

EP by Of Mice & Men
- Released: May 28, 2021
- Recorded: 2020
- Genre: Metalcore
- Length: 12:30
- Label: SharpTone
- Producer: Of Mice & Men

Of Mice & Men chronology
Timeless (2021)	Bloom (2021)	Ad Infinitum (2021)

Singles from Bloom
- 1. "Bloom" Released: April 21, 2021

Bloom is the second EP by American rock band Of Mice & Men. It was released on May 28, 2021, through SharpTone Records. The EP was produced by the band themselves and it is the follow-up to the group's debut EP, Timeless (2021). It is the second part of their so-called "EP Trilogy".

== Background and promotion ==
On April 21, 2021, two months after the band's debut EP release, they unveiled a new single and title track "Bloom" while also announced the EP itself, the EP cover, the track list, and release date. This would be the second of three EPs released in the year.

== Critical reception ==
Professional ratings
Review scores
Source	Rating
Dead Press!	7/10 stars
Distorted Sound	9/10

The EP received generally positive reviews from critics. Dead Press! gave the EP a positive review saying: "Benefitting from a shorter runtime and not playing it too safe, Bloom builds on the foundations of Timeless to create a release that breathes fresh ideas into Of Mice & Men's sound." Distorted Sound gave the EP a higher score than the previous EP and stated that "Recovered from their stumbling block, Of Mice & Men's flower is not for the feint of heart. Taking a psyche in distress, Bloom dissects it into clean thirds like an autopsy. This clinical approach to release construction is perfect for their original modus operandi. These smaller snapshots into dark mentalities are beautiful in their composition. Short, sharp soundtracks such as Bloom are more than enough to have fans begging for more."

== Track listing ==
No.	Title	Length
1.	"Levee"	4:50
2.	"Bloom"	4:17
3.	"Pulling Teeth"	3:22
Total length:		12:30

== Personnel ==
Of Mice & Men

- Aaron Pauley – lead vocals, bass, mixing, mastering
- Alan Ashby – rhythm guitar, backing vocals
- Phil Manansala – lead guitar, backing vocals
- Valentino Arteaga – drums, percussion

Additional personnel

- Of Mice & Men – engineering, production
- Derek Hess – artwork
