= Timeless (Of Mice & Men EP) =

EP by Of Mice & Men
- Released: February 26, 2021
- Recorded: 2020
- Genres: Metalcore; post-hardcore
- Length: 12:31
- Label: SharpTone
- Producer: Of Mice & Men

Of Mice & Men chronology
Earthandsky (2019)	Timeless (2021)	Bloom (2021)

Singles from Timeless
- 1. "Obsolete" Released: January 13, 2021; 2. "Timeless" Released: February 10, 2021

Timeless is the first EP by American metalcore band Of Mice & Men. It was released on February 26, 2021, through SharpTone Records. The EP was produced by the band themselves and it is their first release with the label. It is the first part of their so-called "EP Trilogy".

== Background and promotion ==
On January 13, 2021, the band revealed that they had parted ways with Rise Records and signed with SharpTone Records. At the same time, they released a new single "Obsolete" and announced the EP itself, the EP cover, the track list, and release date. On January 18, Pauley announced via Twitter that this would be the first of three EPs released in the year. On February 10, two weeks before the EP release, the band released the title track "Timeless".

== Critical reception ==
Professional ratings
Review scores
Source	Rating
Dead Press!	8/10 stars
Distorted Sound	8/10
Kerrang!	3/5 stars
Rock 'N' Load	7/10

The EP received generally positive reviews from critics. Dead Press! gave the EP a positive review saying: "A tightly written and deliciously heavy collection of tracks, Timeless is a welcome addition to their catalogue and one that will ultimately satisfy fans. With the brief runtime helping the release, Of Mice & Men have set the bar high for the EPs that are set to follow throughout 2021." Distorted Sound stated that "Sometimes it's just nice to hear a band at the height of their powers doing what they do best. Either way, Timeless marks a solid first entry to OF MICE & MEN's 2021 trilogy, and a record that should have listeners eagerly looking to the next one."

Kerrang! was a little less positive stating, "It's by no means the best you'll ever hear from OMM, but then that's not the point here, is it? And anyway, it's still good stuff. One might think of these tracks as a punchbag, a way of staying in shape while you may otherwise lose your gains during downtime. And who knows, once they bed in a bit, when OMM finally play them live, they might have turned into a knockout." Rock 'N' Load praised the EP saying, "Timeless is a great EP, filled with fantastic musicianship and ideas that merge the band's history with their evolved sound. Following Earthandsky was never going to be an easy job for the band to complete, but this EP is a great step in once again further developing as musicians in a genre that is massively overflowing with competition for the spotlight. My one genuine issue with this EP is the length, being only three tracks in length, I found myself only being truly pulled into the experience by track 3. While wanting more of something is never a bad thing, in the case of Timeless I want more because it feels like something is missing. Overall the EP is yet another fantastic release, I just wish it was slightly longer."

== Track listing ==
No.	Title	Length
1.	"Timeless"	4:06
2.	"Obsolete"	4:25
3.	"Anchor"	3:58
Total length:		12:31

== Personnel ==
Credits adapted from Discogs.

Of Mice & Men

- Aaron Pauley – lead vocals, bass, mixing, mastering
- Alan Ashby – rhythm guitar, backing vocals
- Phil Manansala – lead guitar, backing vocals
- Valentino Arteaga – drums, percussion

Additional personnel

- Of Mice & Men – engineering, production
- Derek Hess – artwork
