= Psilocybe Larvae =

Russian band

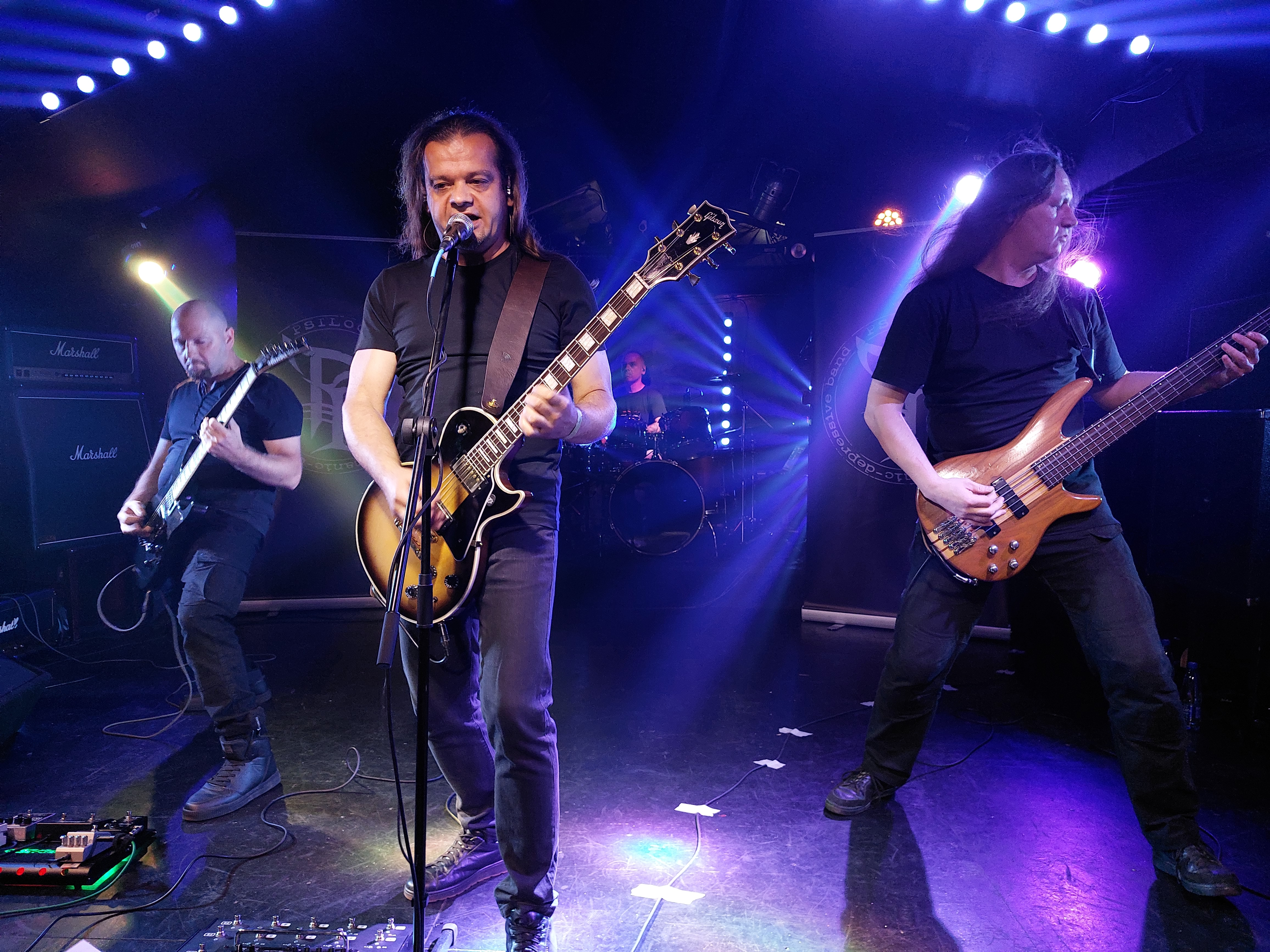
- Psilocybe Larvae performing live in Saint Petersburg in September 2024

Background information
- Origin: Saint Petersburg, Russia
- Genres: Melodic death metal Doom metal Progressive metal
- Years active: 1996–present
- Labels: Dark Harvest Records; Mazzar Records; CD-Maximum; Buil2Kill Records
- Members: Vitaly "Larv" Belobritsky; Alex "Liga" Legotin; Anton Veresov; Alexander Yakovlev
- Website: psilocybe-larvae.ru/

Psilocybe Larvae is a Russian melodic death metal band based in Saint Petersburg. It was formed in 1996 at Vyborg. The band was led by Vitaly Belobritsky, but it has gone through various changes since it was formed.

== History ==
The story of PSILOCYBE LARVAE started in 1996 in the Russian city of Vyborg, when Vitaly "Larv" Belobritsky (voc/git), Denis Vinogradov (git), Oleg Peshkichev (bass) and Eugene Ushakov (drums) formed the band to indulge their passion for melodic and haunting death/dark metal.

After recording the first demo, "Liar", the band soon entered a professional studio in the same year to record a song for the "Russian Alternative Extreme Music" sampler. Drum parts for that song were provided by Ilya "Alan" Piyaev (AZEROTH, PAINFUL MEMORIES) as Eugene decided to leave the band just before recording. The compilation, including PSYLOCYBE LARVAE’s "Death Is Not the End," was released in 1998.

Following a short interlude with METALLIZATION’s Eugene Golubkov, PSILOCYBE LARVAE finally found a permanent drummer in 1999 when Alan took over drum duties. The new line-up entered the studio again in mid-2000 to record their first full-length album, Stigmata. This self-released effort garnered some favorable feedback, including the "demo of the month" award in Germany's Legacy magazine, so Black Side Productions decided to re-release Stigmata on CD in 2001.

Meanwhile, the band underwent further lineup changes with Andrey replacing Denis on guitar, and Den joining the band as a keyboardist. The year 2002 saw PSILOCYBE LARVAE contributing two cover songs to MANOWAR and CHIMERA tributes, but more importantly, the band finally finished recording their second album. Agony was released by Black Side Productions at the beginning of 2003.

The following months dealt another blow to the line-up, as Oleg's addictions started to get out of hand. For that reason, the band decided to part ways with him in December 2004, leaving PSILOCYBE LARVAE without a bass player for quite some time.

A “silver lining” appeared in 2005 when Russia's major label CD-Maximum agreed to remaster and re-release the two albums with bonus tracks. The band also found a new bass player in Alex "Liga" Legotin. But after a few months, Alex had to leave the group. Keyboardist Den was fired as well, and in the fall of 2005, the band was eventually forced to relocate to St. Petersburg with no stable line-up in what looked like a semi-hiatus.

In St. Petersburg, Alex rejoined the ranks, and keyboardist Dmitry "Chaos" Orekhov completed the line-up to release the band from its forced inactivity. After headlining the Ukrainian "Triple Interaction" tour in autumn 2006, the band entered DDT Records in January 2007 to record their third album, Non-existence. It was mixed at Studio Hertz (Poland), mastered at Cutting Room (Sweden), and released in February 2008 by Moscow label Mazzar Records. In March, the band headlined a Russian Non-existent tour to support the new album.

During 2008, the band continued to promote Non-existence by doing shows in Russia and taking part in a Belarus tour named "Creative Breath of Death" together with KATALEPSY, DEATHBRINGER and THELEMA.

In 2009, PSILOCYBE LARVAE signed to Dark Harvest Records (USA) for an international release of Non-existence and started songwriting for future releases.

After two years of intensive work, Russian musicians returned with a brand new album called The Labyrinth Of Penumbra. The recording and mixing process took place at studio Kontakt under the guidance of Yury Smirnov, the mastering duties were handled by Mats Lindfors at Cutting Room and cover art was taken care of A-Ra Design and W. Smerdulak. The time has come to find a new label, and in 2012, The Labyrinth Of Penumbra was released by Buil2Kill Records/Nadir Music (Italy). With great success, the band played many gigs in Russia, the Baltic States and Finland to promote the album.

The beginning of 2013 was marked by the signing of an agreement with Albagi Music Promotion to help the band with promotion in Germany. PSILOCYBE LARVAE continued their concert activity in support of the new album; they went on a 6-day tour of Belarus, called the "Penumbra Divisus Tour," in February, and the "Tour By Fire," including 8 cities in Poland and the Czech Republic, in November. In summer, the band participated in the largest Estonian open-air festival, Hard Rock Laager, sharing the stage with TESTAMENT, MARDUK, and others.

At the same time, another line-up change happened. The band parted ways with guitarist Andrey "Luke" Lukashkov and drummer Ilya "Alan" Piyaev. Konstantin Kot'h (guitar) and Evgeny "Evg" Trefilov (drums) from industrial metal band VERGELTUNG came on board as the new members of PSILOCYBE LARVAE.

In 2014-2015 PSILOCYBE LARVAE went through several major line-up changes again: the split with Kot’h and Evg; Liga's departure, as well as his comeback; recruiting a new drummer, Alexander Yakovlev (MISANTHROPE COUNT MERCIFUL, THARTARIA) and a new guitar player, Roman "Dorian" Kondratev (REFAWN, TOPHET).

Due to personal reasons, Alexander left PSILOCYBE LARVAE in 2015, and his place behind the drum kit was taken by the band's former drummer Alan. With the renewed line-up, PSILOCYBE LARVAE played at Wave-Gotik-Treffen Festival in Germany, Dobry Festival in Slovakia and Metalurg open-air festival in Russia in 2016/2017.

In 2018, a brand new single “The Fall Of Icarus” was out on all digital platforms, and the lyric video followed it up. The song was also presented at two European open-air festivals: Metalshow.lv in Latvia and Meltdown Festival in Germany.

During the process of recording a new album in 2019, the band parted ways with Dorian and Alan. Alex Yakovlev replaced Alan on drums again and Anton Veresov (BUICIDE, SEVERNYE VRATA) filled in for Dorian on guitar. The new album—Where Silence Dwells—was finished in 2020. It was recorded in different studios in St. Petersburg, mixed by the band’s friend Dmitry Vasiliev in Moscow, and mastered by renowned engineer Thomas Eberger in Stockholm Mastering.

Invigorated with the new line-up and a new album scheduled for release at the end of 2021, PSILOCYBE LARVAE resumed their concert activity, celebrating the 25th band anniversary in their hometown, Vyborg, and taking part in the open-air festival Тьма (Darkness) in the woods near St. Petersburg. The album was released on December 15, 2021, via Red Rivet Records and Fono Ltd. in CD format, as well as a cassette version (self-released). The vinyl LP was released by the band in February 2022.

Two years later, the musicians entered the Dobrolet studio in St. Petersburg and recorded their most experimental and unusual material. Mixing and mastering were done by Igor Butz at Pentagram House in Moscow. The EP, called “Новый Дивный Мир(Brave New World)”, includes two brand new songs in Russian—the first in the band's history—alongside a re-recorded version of the track "Hostile Emptiness "from their 2003 album, Agony. Unleashed digitally on August 15, 2025, the EP is available for listeners worldwide on all major streaming services.

== Members ==
Current members

- Vit "Larv" Belobritsky (vocals, guitar)
- Alex "Liga" Legotin (bass)
- Antuan Veresov (guitar)
- Sasha Yakovlev (drums)

Former members

- Denis Vinogradov (guitar)
- Evgeniy Golubkov (drums)
- Evgeniy Ushakov (drums)
- Evgeniy Trefilov (drums)
- Roman "Dorian" Kondratev (guitar)
- Dmitriy Orekhov (keyboards)
- Oleg Peshkichev (bass)
- Konstantin Kot'h (guitar)
- Andrei Lukashkov (guitar)
- Ilia "Alan" Piyaev (drums)

== Discography ==
=== Albums ===
- 1996 - Liar Demo (Self prod.)
- 2000 - Stigmata MC (Self prod.)
- 2001 - Stigmata CD (Black Side prod.)
- 2003 - Agony CD, MC (Black Side prod.)
- 2005 - Stigmata & Agony CD (CD-Maximum — Russia) re-released
- 2008 - Non-Existence CD (Mazzar Records — Russia, Ukraine, Belarus)
- 2009 - Non-Existence CD (Dark Harvest Records — world)
- 2012 - The Labyrinth of Penumbra CD (Buil2Kill Records / Nadir Music — world)
- 2021 - Where Silence Dwells CD (Red Rivet Records / Fono Ltd.)

=== Singles ===
2018 - "The Fall Of Icarus" (digital release - world)

=== Compilations ===
- 1998 - CD, MC "Russian Alternative Extreme Music" "Death is not the End" song
- 2002 - CD "Vampiria" magazine "Stigmata" song
- 2003 - CD "Black Hole" magazine "Agony" song
- 2004 - CD "Buckets Of Blood" vol.2 (Bloodbucket Productions) "Out Of Sanity" song
- 2004 - CD "Manowar Russian Tribute" (Piranha Records) "Blood Of The Kings" cover
- 2006 - MC "Total Jazz - Tribute to Chimera" (Карма Мира Records/Outcry Records) "Karma Of The World" song
- 2006 - DVD "Rock Palace Open-Air ' 05" 1 song
- 2007 - DVD "Rock Palace Open-Air ' 06" 2 songs
- 2008 - CD "Total Jazz - Tribute to Chimera" (Карма Мира Records/Kap-kan Records) "Karma Of The World" song
- 2008 - CD "Hell On Fire" compilation "Sleepwalkers" song

== Concerts ==
The band has opened for:

- Norther - SPb, Arctica club, 2006г.
- Anathema - SPb, Orlandina club, 2007г.
- Swallow the sun - SPb, Petrodoom festival, 2008г.
- Sadist - SPb, Orlandina club, 2010г.
- Blindead - mini tour: SPb - Moscow, 2011г.
- Vesania - SPb, Orlandina club, 2011г.
- Kypck - SPb, Zal club, 2014г.

=== Festivals ===
- Night Voyage festival, Vyborg - 1996–1998, 2004, 2007, 2010
- Rock Palace, Pushkin, Saint Petersburg - 2005, 2006
- Hard Rock Laager open-air festival, Vana-Vigala - 2013
- Wave-Gotik-Treffen, Leipzig - 2016
- Dobry open-air festival, Prešov - 2016
- Metalurg open-air festival, Olenegorsk - 2017
- Metalshow.lv open-air festival, Ekabpils - 2018
- Meltdown open-air festival, Schuby - 2018
- Тьма open-air festival, Vyborgsky district of the Leningrad region - 2021
