= Nai (pan flute) =

Traditional Romanian diatonic pan flute

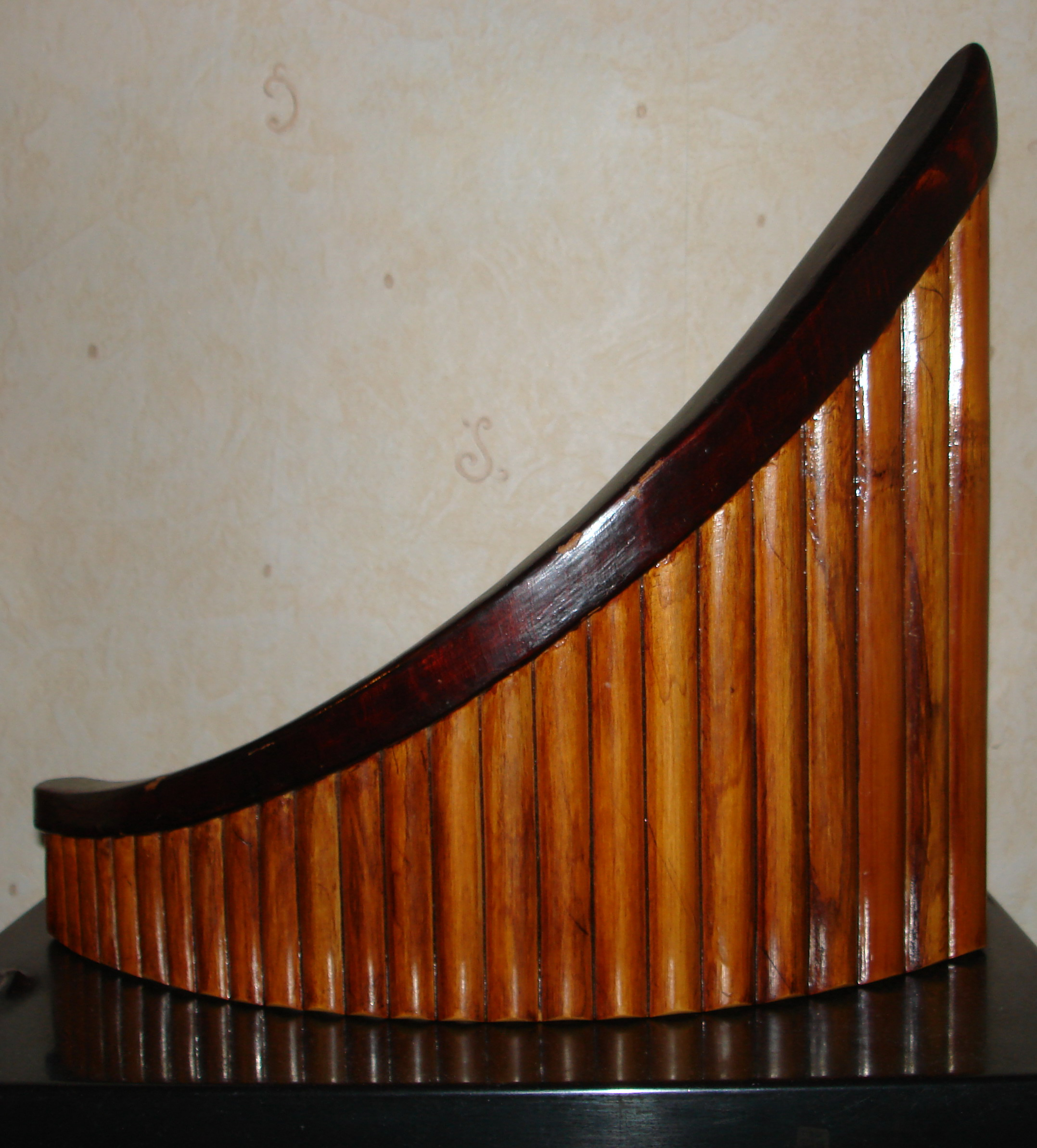
A traditional nai

The nai (archaic: muscal) is a traditional Romanian diatonic pan flute used in a lot of genres.

== Structure ==
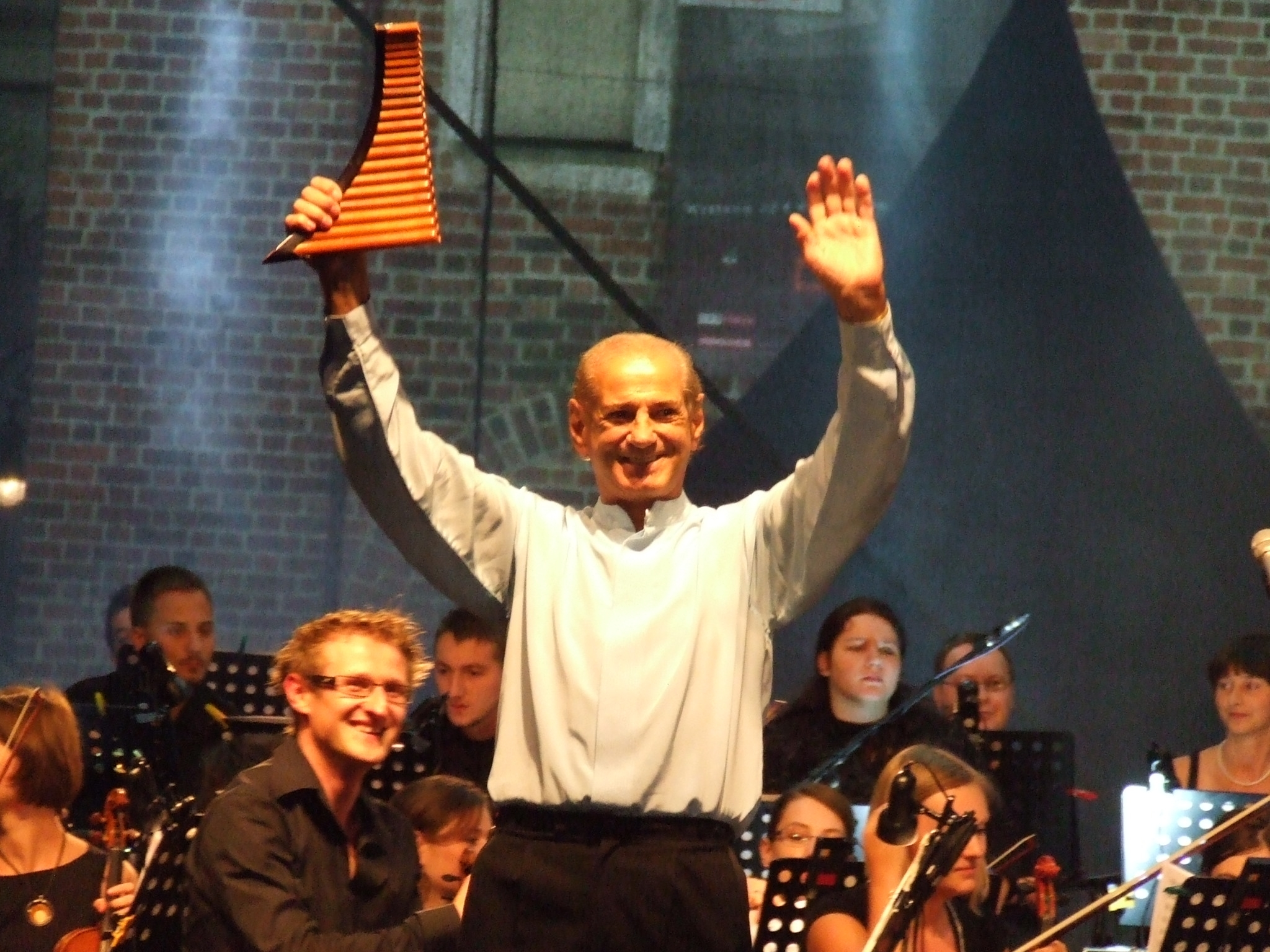
Gheorghe Zamfir holding a nai

The nai usually has at least 20 pipes made of bamboo or reed. They are arranged in a curved array, allowing greater speed of play. Generally the longer, lower pipes are on the right. The pitch of each pipe is adjusted with beeswax; usually nais are tuned in G for Romanian folk music, or in C for classical. Traditional Romanian pan flutes have tubes with varying diameters which go from wide to narrow as you go up the scale, to maintain the volume/length ratio of the tube and therefore produce the best consistent tone quality.

== Famous nai players ==
- Fănică Luca
- Damian Luca
- Gheorghe Zamfir
- Simion Stanciu
- Radu Simion
- Damian Drăghici
- Nicolae Pîrvu
- Dana Dragomir
- Constantin Moscovici
