= Fireside Dinner Theatre =

Dinner theater and venue in Wisconsin, US

Coordinates: 42°54′51.3″N 88°50′54.0″W

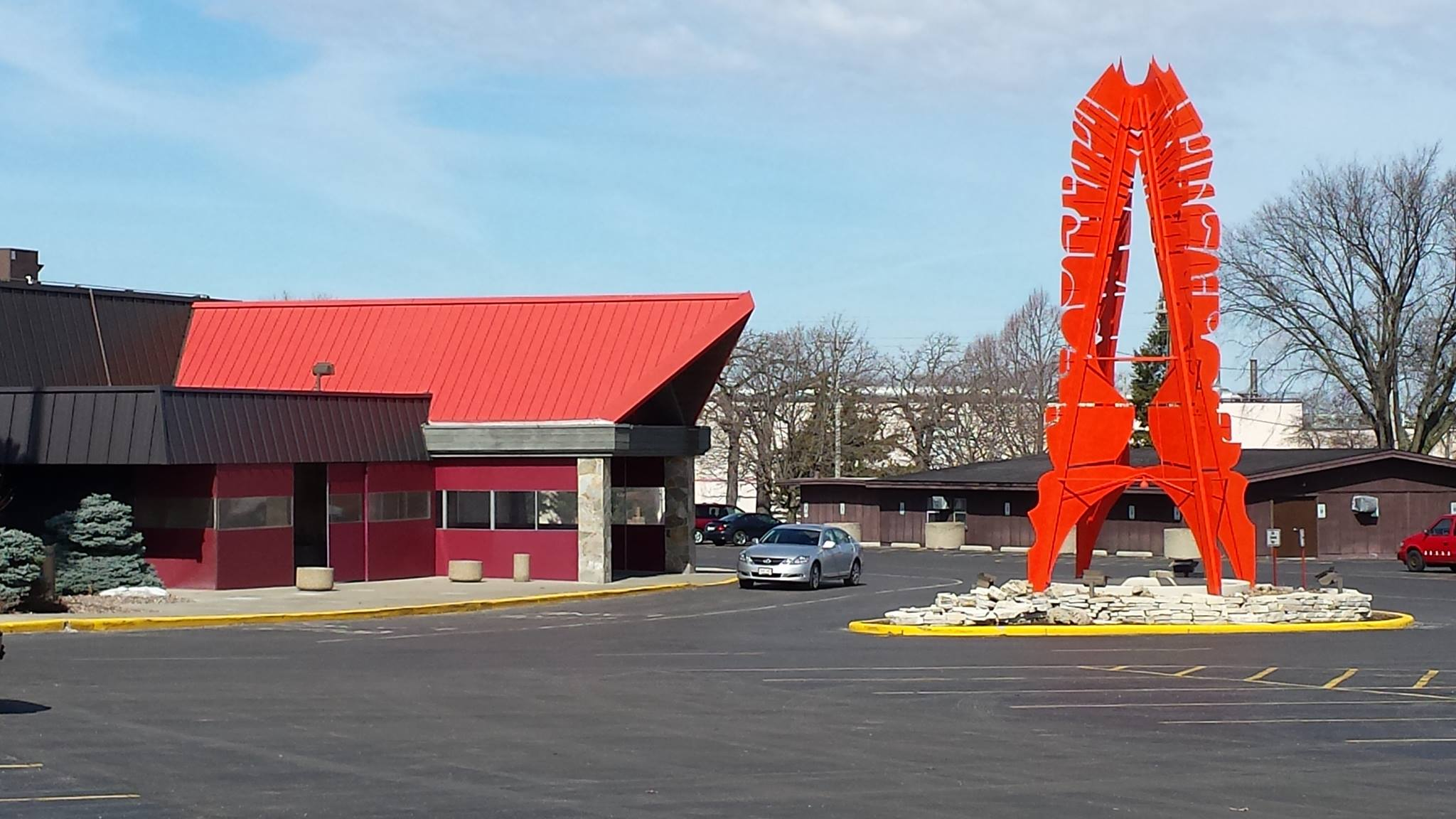
- Interactive map of the Fireside Dinner Theatre area

General information
- Location: Fort Atkinson, Wisconsin, United States

Website
- www.firesidetheatre.com

Fireside Dinner Theater is a historic dinner theater and special events venue in Fort Atkinson, Wisconsin. The original building and several expansions were designed by Fort Atkinson-based architect Helmut Ajango, who also designed The Gobbler, and built in 1964. A nearby building was purchased for conversion into a theater and added to the complex. The business is run by the Klopcic family.

== Stage productions ==
Productions
Production	Type	Open date	Close date	Notes
South Pacific	Musical	April 25, 1978	September 3, 1978	
The Sunshine Boys	Play	September 6, 1978	November 25, 1978	
Carnival!	Musical	November 29, 1978	February 25, 1979	
Oklahoma!	Musical	March 14, 1979	July 29, 1979	
My Fair Lady	Musical	August 3, 1979	December 31, 1979	
The King and I	Musical	March 14, 1980	July 28, 1980	
Fiddler on the Roof	Musical	August 1, 1980	December 31, 1980	
I Do! I Do!	Musical	January 22, 1981	March 1, 1981	
Carousel	Musical	March 6, 1981	June 21, 1981	
Hello Dolly!	Musical	June 26, 1981	September 6, 1981	
Camelot	Musical	September 11, 1981	December 31, 1981	
Plaza Suite	Play	January 8, 1982	February 21, 1982	
Show Boat	Musical	February 26, 1982	June 6, 1982	
Gypsy	Musical	June 11, 1982	September 5, 1982	
The Sound of Music	Musical	September 10, 1982	January 2, 1983	
Same Time, Next Year	Play	January 7, 1983	February 20, 1983	
South Pacific	Musical	February 25, 1983	June 5, 1983	
The Music Man	Musical	June 10, 1983	September 4, 1983	
Annie Get Your Gun	Musical	September 9, 1983	December 31, 1983	
The Hawaiian Christmas Extravaganza	Revue	January 6, 1984	February 26, 1984	
Kismet	Musical	March 2, 1984	June 3, 1984	
The Student Prince	Operetta	June 8, 1984	August 12, 1984	
Fiddler on the Roof	Musical	August 17, 1984	December 31, 1984	
Hawaii Calls	Musical	January 4, 1985	March 31, 1985	
Oklahoma!	Musical	April 3, 1985	July 7, 1985	
Mexican Fiesta	Revue	July 10, 1985	September 8, 1985	
Annie	Musical	September 11, 1985	December 31, 1985	
Hawaii International	Revue	January 3, 1986	March 30, 1986	
Hello, Dolly!	Musical	April 3, 1986	July 6, 1986	
Fiesta Grande	Revue	July 9, 1986	September 7, 1986	
My Fair Lady	Musical	September 10, 1986	December 31, 1986	
Hawaii '87	Revue	January 3, 1987	March 1, 1987	
Guys and Dolls	Musical	March 4, 1987	May 31, 1987	
George M!	Musical	June 3, 1987	September 6, 1987	
The Sound of Music	Musical	September 9, 1987	January 3, 1987	
Hawaii '88	Revue	January 6, 1988	February 28, 1988	
They're Playing our Song	Musical	March 2, 1988	May 28, 1988	
The King and I	Musical	June 1, 1988	September 4, 1988	
42nd Street	Musical	September 7, 1988	January 1, 1989	
Memories of Hawaii	Revue	January 4, 1989	February 26, 1989	
Kiss Me, Kate	Musical	March 1, 1989	May 28, 1989	
The Music Man	Musical	May 31, 1989	September 3, 1989	
Singin' in the Rain	Musical	September 8, 1989	January 7, 1990	
Holiday in Acapulco	Revue	January 10, 1990	March 4, 1990	
70, Girls, 70	Musical	March 7, 1990	May 27, 1990	
Seven Brides for Seven Brothers	Musical	May 30, 1990	September 2, 1990	
Fiddler on the Roof	Musical	September 5, 1990	December 31, 1990	
Return to Paradise	Revue	January 3, 1991	March 3, 1991	
Funny Girl	Musical	March 6, 1991	May 26, 1991	
Mame	Musical	May 29, 1991	September 1, 1991	
Meet Me in St. Louis	Musical	September 4, 1991	December 31, 1991	
Grand New Opry Revue	Revue	January 3, 1992	March 15, 1992	
Oklahoma!	Musical	March 18, 1992	June 7, 1992	
Annie	Musical	June 10, 1992	August 30, 1992	
Phantom	Musical	September 4, 1992	January 3, 1993	
Country Music Jamboree	Revue	January 6, 1993	March 14, 1993	
The Student Prince	Operetta	March 17, 1993	May 23, 1993	
Nunsense	Musical	May 26, 1993	August 1, 1993	
Guys and Dolls	Musical	August 4, 1993	October 17, 1993	
A Fireside Christmas	Revue	October 20, 1993	January 2, 1994	
Legends of Country	Revue	January 5, 1994	March 6, 1994	
The Unsinkable Molly Brown	Musical	March 10, 1994	May 15, 1994	
My Fair Lady	Musical	May 19, 1994	July 24, 1994	
Anything Goes	Musical	July 28, 1994	October 2, 1994	
A Fireside Christmas	Revue	October 6, 1994	December 31, 1994	
Return to Hawaii	Revue	January 5, 1995	February 26, 1995	
Me and My Girl	Musical	March 2, 1995	April 30, 1995	
Gypsy	Musical	May 4, 1995	July 2, 1995	
Sayonara	Musical	July 6, 1995	October 15, 1995	
A Fireside Christmas	Revue	October 19, 1995	December 31, 1995	
A Closer Walk with Patsy Cline	Musical	January 4, 1996	February 25, 1996	
Crazy for You	Musical	February 19, 1996	May 12, 1996	
The Will Rogers Follies	Musical	May 16, 1996	August 4, 1996	
Seven Brides for Seven Brothers	Musical	August 8, 1996	October 20, 1996	
A Fireside Christmas	Revue	October 24, 1996	December 31, 1996	
Legends in Concert	Revue	January 3, 1997	March 16, 1997	
Nunsense	Musical	March 20, 1997	May 11, 1997	
Joseph and the Amazing Technicolor Dreamcoat	Musical	May 15, 1997	August 3, 1997	
Fiddler on the Roof	Musical	August 7, 1997	October 12, 1997	
A Fireside Christmas	Revue	October 16, 1997	December 21, 1997	
Legends in Concert	Revue	December 26, 1997	March 1, 1998	
Camelot	Musical	March 5, 1998	May 17, 1998	
I Do! I Do!	Musical	May 21, 1998	July 12, 1998	
Phantom	Musical	July 16, 1998	October 11, 1998	
A Fireside Christmas	Revue	October 15, 1998	December 20, 1998	
Hawaii Calls	Musical	December 30, 1998	February 28, 1999	
Show Boat	Musical	March 4, 1999	May 16, 1999	
Joseph and the Amazing Technicolor Dreamcoat	Musical	May 20, 1999	July 25, 1999	
State Fair	Musical	July 29, 1999	October 10, 1999	
A Fireside Christmas	Revue	October 14, 1999	December 26, 1999	
A Closer Walk with Patsy Cline	Musical	December 30, 1999	February 27, 2000	
Brigadoon	Musical	March 2, 2000	May 14, 2000	
On Golden Pond	Play	May 18, 2000	July 23, 2000	
Once Upon a Mattress	Musical	July 27, 2000	October 8, 2000	
A Fireside Christmas	Revue	October 12, 2000	December 23, 2000	
And They Called It Ireland	Revue	December 29, 2000	February 25, 2001	
Man of La Mancha	Musical	March 1, 2001	May 6, 2001	
Driving Miss Daisy	Play	May 10, 2001	July 15, 2001	
Titanic	Musical	July 19, 2001	October 7, 2001	
A Fireside Christmas	Revue	October 11, 2001	December 23, 2001	
A Little Bit O' Ireland	Revue	December 28, 2001	February 24, 2002	
A Funny Thing Happened on the Way to the Forum	Musical	February 29, 2002	May 5, 2002	
Steel Magnolias	Musical	May 9, 2002	July 14, 2002	
The Sound of Music	Musical	July 28, 2002	September 29, 2002	
A Fireside Christmas	Revue	October 3, 2002	December 22, 2002	
Pump Boys and Dinettes	Musical	December 27, 2002	February 23, 2003	
Hello Dolly!	Musical	February 27, 2003	May 4, 2003	
Annie Get Your Gun	Musical	May 8, 2003	July 13, 2003	
Seven Brides for Seven Brothers	Musical	July 17, 2003	September 28, 2003	
A Fireside Christmas	Revue	October 2, 2003	December 21, 2003	
I Do! I Do!	Musical	December 26, 2003	February 22, 2004	
Guys and Dolls	Musical	February 26, 2004	May 2, 2004	
Annie	Musical	May 6, 2004	Jul 18, 2004	
South Pacific	Musical	July 22, 2004	October 3, 2004	
A Fireside Christmas	Revue	October 7, 2004	December 23, 2004	
Swing on a Star	Revue	December 30, 2004	February 27, 2005	
West Side Story	Musical	March 3, 2005	May 15, 2005	
Beauty and the Beast	Musical	May 19, 2005	August 14, 2005	
Damn Yankees	Musical	August 18, 2005	October 16, 2005	
A Fireside Christmas	Revue	October 20, 2005	December 23, 2005	
Those Fabulous Fifties	Revue	December 29, 2005	March 5, 2006	
The Music Man	Musical	March 9, 2006	May 14, 2006	
Evita	Musical	May 18, 2006	July 30, 2006	
42nd Street	Musical	August 3, 2006	October 15, 2006	
A Fireside Christmas	Revue	October 19, 2006	December 23, 2006	
Hollywood Sings	Revue	December 28, 2006	March 18, 2007	
Fiddler on the Roof	Musical	March 22, 2007	May 27, 2007	
Neil Simon's The Odd Couple	Play	May 31, 2007	July 29, 2007	
Thoroughly Modern Millie	Musical	August 2, 2007	October 14, 2007	
A Fireside Christmas	Revue	October 18, 2007	December 23, 2007	
Best of the Bands	Revue	December 28, 2007	March 9, 2008	
Anything Goes	Musical	March 13, 2008	May 18, 2008	
Barefoot in the Park	Play	May 22, 2008	July 6, 2008	
The Rock and the Rabbi	Musical	July 10, 2008	August 17, 2008	
How to Succeed in Business Without Really Trying	Musical	August 21, 2008	October 19, 2008	
A Fireside Christmas	Revue	October 23, 2008	December 21, 2008	
Those Fabulous Fifties – 2	Revue	December 31, 2008	February 22, 2009	
The Fantasticks	Musical	February 26, 2009	April 19, 2009	
Disney's High School Musical on Stage!	Musical	April 23, 2009	July 5, 2009	
The Witnesses	Play	July 9, 2009	August 23, 2009	
The Sound of Music	Musical	August 27, 2009	November 1, 2009	
Here's Love	Musical	November 5, 2009	December 27, 2009	
Ring in the New	Revue	December 32, 2009	December 31, 2009	
Those Fabulous 50's & 60's	Revue	January 14, 2010	March 7, 2010	
Joseph and the Amazing Technicolor Dreamcoat	Musical	March 11, 2010	May 2, 2010	
Rogers and Hammerstein's Cinderella	Musical	May 6, 2010	June 27, 2010	
Ring of Fire	Musical	July 8, 2010	August 29, 2010	
Hairspray	Musical	September 2, 2010	October 31, 2010	
A Fireside Christmas featuring The Child	Revue	November 4, 2010	December 23, 2010	
Ring in the New 2011	Revue	December 31, 2010	December 31, 2010	
Swing on a Star	Revue	January 13, 2011	February 27, 2011	
Annie	Musical	March 3, 2011	May 1, 2011	
A Closer Walk with Patsy Cline	Musical	May 5, 2011	June 26, 2011	
David	Musical	July 7, 2011	August 21, 2011	
Seven Brides for Seven Brothers	Musical	August 25, 2011	October 23, 2011	
A Fireside Christmas	Revue	October 27, 2011	December 22, 2011	
Ring in the New 2012	Revue	December 31, 2011	December 31, 2011	
Viva Vegas	Revue	January 19, 2012	March 4, 2012	
9 to 5	Musical	March 8, 2012	May 6, 2012	
Legally Blonde	Musical	May 10, 2012	July 1, 2012	
Stand By Your Man	Musical	July 5, 2012	August 19, 2012	
Hello Dolly!	Musical	August 23, 2012	October 21, 2012	
Scrooge	Musical	October 25, 2012	December 23, 2012	
Ring in the New 2013	Revue	December 31, 2012	December 31, 2012	
Sizzlin' 60's	Revue	January 10, 2013	February 24, 2013	
Footloose	Musical	February 28, 2013	April 14, 2013	
Annie Get Your Gun	Musical	April 18, 2013	June 9, 2013	
Little Shop of Horrors	Musical	June 13, 2013	July 14, 2013	
Run for your Wife	Play	July 25, 2013	September 1, 2013	
Once Upon a Mattress	Musical	September 5, 2013	October 27, 2013	
A Fireside Christmas	Revue	October 31, 2013	December 22, 2013	
Solid Gold 60's	Revue	January 9, 2014	February 23, 2014	
Mary Poppins	Musical	February 27, 2014	April 20, 2014	
Fiddler on the Roof	Musical	April 24, 2014	June 8, 2014	
Driving Miss Daisy	Play	June 12, 2014	July 20, 2014	
Smokey Joe's Cafe	Revue	July 24, 2014	August 31, 2014	
Les Miserables	Musical	September 11, 2014	October 26, 2014	
A Fireside Christmas	Revue	October 30, 2014	December 21, 2014	
The Sensational 70's	Revue	January 9, 2015	February 23, 2015	
The Wizard of Oz	Musical	February 26, 2015	April 19, 2015	
All Shook Up	Musical	April 23, 2015	June 7, 2015	
Guys on Ice	Musical	June 11, 2015	July 19, 2015	
Pump Boys and Dinettes	Musical	July 23, 2015	September 6, 2015	
West Side Story	Musical	September 10, 2015	October 25, 2015	
It's a Wonderful Life	Musical	October 29, 2015	December 27, 2015	
Legends in Concert	Revue	January 7, 2016	February 21, 2016	
Peter Pan	Musical	February 25, 2016	April 10, 2016	
Sister Act	Musical	April 14, 2016	May 29, 2016	
Rockin' at the Fireside	Revue	June 2, 2016	July 17, 2016	
Singin' in the Rain	Musical	July 21, 2016	September 4, 2016	
Million Dollar Quartet	Musical	September 8, 2016	October 30, 2016	
A Fireside Christmas	Revue	November 3, 2016	December 23, 2016	
Mamma Mia!	Musical	December 29, 2016	February 26, 2017	
Beauty and the Beast	Musical	March 2, 2017	April 16, 2017	
South Pacific	Musical	April 20, 2017	June 4, 2017	
Back to the 50's	Revue	June 8, 2017	July 23, 2017	
Church Basement Ladies	Musical	July 27, 2017	September 10, 2017	
Elvis Lives	Revue	September 14, 2017	October 29, 2017	
Miracle on 34th Street	Musical	November 2, 2017	December 23, 2017	Original Broadway title "Here's Love"
Yeston & Kopit's Phantom	Musical	December 29, 2017	February 18, 2018	
Disney's Newsies	Musical	February 22, 2018	April 8, 2018	
42nd Street	Musical	April 12, 2018	May 27, 2018	
A Second Helping – Church Basement Lades 2	Musical	May 31, 2018	July 15, 2018	
Disney's The Little Mermaid	Musical	July 19, 2018	September 2, 2018	
Grease	Musical	September 6, 2018	October 28, 2018	
Elf the Musical	Musical	November 1, 2018	December 23, 2018	
Legends of Country	Revue	December 31, 2018	February 17, 2019	
My Fair Lady	Musical	February 21, 2019	April 7, 2019	
Menopause the Musical	Musical	April 11, 2019	May 26, 2019	
That's What I Call Rock N Roll	Revue	May 30, 2019	July 14, 2019	
Annie	Musical	July 18, 2019	September 1, 2019	
Buddy – The Buddy Holly Story	Musical	September 5, 2019	October 27, 2019	
A Christmas Story: The Musical	Musical	October 31, 2019	December 22, 2019	
Saturday Night Fever	Musical	December 31, 2019	February 23, 2020	
Guys and Dolls	Musical	February 27, 2020	March 15, 2020	Originally scheduled to run through April 12, 2020. Closed early due to COVID-19 closure.
Rogers and Hammerstein's Cinderella	Musical	July 22, 2021	August 15, 2021	Originally scheduled July 23, 2020 – September 6, 2020. Moved due to COVID-19 closure.
Joseph and the Amazing Technicolor Dreamcoat	Musical	September 9, 2021	October 3, 2021	Originally scheduled September 10, 2020 – October 25, 2020. Moved due to COVID-19 closure.
Irving Berlin's Holiday Inn	Musical	October 28, 2021	November 21, 2021	Originally scheduled October 29, 2020 – December 27, 2020. Moved due to COVID-19 closure.
Ring in the New 2022	Revue	December 31, 2021	December 21, 2021	
The Sound of Music	Musical	March 3, 2022	April 17, 2022	
A Mighty Fortress is our Basement – Church Basement Ladies 3	Musical	April 21, 2022	June 5, 2022	Originally scheduled April 16, 2020 – May 31, 2020. Moved due to COVID-19 closure.
What Happens in Vegas	Revue	June 9, 2022	July 24, 2022	Originally scheduled June 4, 2020 – July 19, 2020. Moved due to COVID-19 closure.
The Wizard of Oz	Musical	July 28, 2022	September 11, 2022	
Grease	Musical	September 15, 2022	October 30, 2022	
Irving Berlin's White Christmas	Musical	November 3, 2022	December 23, 2022	
The Music Man	Musical	February 23, 2023	April 9, 2023	
Grumpy Old Men – The Musical	Musical	April 13, 2023	May 23, 2023	
Legends in Concert – Direct from London	Revue	June 1, 2023	July 16, 2023	
Mary Poppins	Musical	July 20, 2023	September 3, 2023	
Titanic	Musical	September 7, 2023	October 29, 2023	
Scrooge the Musical	Musical	November 2, 2023	December 23, 2023	
Jersey Boys	Musical	January 4, 2024	February 25, 2024	
Fiddler on the Roof	Musical	February 29, 2024	April 14, 2024	
Beautiful – The Carole King Musical	Musical	April 18, 2024	May 26, 2024	
Nunsense	Musical	May 30, 2024	July 14, 2024	
Matilda – The Musical	Musical	July 18, 2024	August 25, 2024	
Rocky – The Musical	Musical	September 12, 2024	October 27, 2024	
Miracle on 34th Street	Musical	October 31, 2024	December 22, 2024	Original Broadway title "Here's Love"
Legends in Concert - Back in the Building	Revue	January 9, 2025	February 23, 2025	
West Side Story	Musical	February 27, 2025	April 13, 2025	
Murder on the Orient Express	Play	April 17, 2025	June 1, 2025	
The Last (Potluck) Supper	Musical	June 5, 2025	July 20, 2025	
Disney's The Little Mermaid	Musical	July 24, 2025	September 7, 2025	
Oklahoma!	Musical	September 11, 2025	October 25, 2025	
A Wonderful Life	Musical	October 30, 2025	December 28, 2025	
Beehive: The '60s Musical	Revue	January 15, 2026	February 22, 2026	
The Addams Family	Musical	February 26, 2026	April 12, 2026	
Hairspray	Musical	April 16, 2026	May 31, 2026	
Million Dollar Quartet	Musical	June 4, 2026	July 19, 2026	
Disney's Frozen	Musical	July 23, 2026	September 6, 2026	
Come From Away	Musical	September 10, 2026	October 25, 2026	
A Christmas Story: The Musical	Musical	October 29, 2026	December 20, 2026	
Buddy – The Buddy Holly Story	Musical	January 7, 2027	February 14, 2027	
Pretty Woman	Musical	February 18, 2027	April 11, 2027	
Rise Up, O Men	Musical	April 15, 2027	May 23, 2027	
Heartbreak Hotel	Musical	May 27, 2027	July 11, 2027	
Disney's Newsies	Musical	July 15, 2027	August 29, 2027	
Clue	Play	September 2, 2027	October 24, 2027	
Irving Berlin's White Christmas	Musical	October 28, 2027	December 23, 2027	
