= Daniel Patrick Russell =

Australian actor

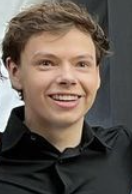
- Russell in 2022
- Born: Umina Beach, Australia
- Occupation: Actor
- Years active: 2009–present

Daniel Patrick Russell is an Australian actor. He is best known for his roles on stage, including the title role in Billy Elliot the Musical in the Australian production and Broadway tour.

== Early life ==
Russell is from Umina Beach in New South Wales, Australia. His first role was the titular role in a 2007 community theatre production of Oliver!.

== Career ==
Russell's professional career began starring in Billy Elliot the Musical. After submitting a DVD, he was invited to audition in person, before landing the role in the Australian production, debuting on 25 April 2009. He was later flown to the United States to reprise the role on the Broadway Tour, alongside Faith Prince, commencing 14 November 2010. He received positive reviews, with The People's Critic stating that "Russell shines like some beacon of light" and BroadwayWorld Reviews stating that he was "beyond amazing with a powerful performance ..." While touring, Russell performed a special showcase on The Price is Right.

In 2019 it was announced that Russell would play one of the Jets in Steven Spielberg's film remake of West Side Story. The film released in theaters on 10 December 2021, after a year-long delay due to the COVID-19 pandemic.

On 28 October 2021, it was announced that Russell would perform on Broadway in the revival of The Music Man starring Hugh Jackman and Sutton Foster, playing at the Winter Garden Theatre, directed by Jerry Zaks. On 6 June 2022 Russell was awarded a special Theatre World Award for his performance alongside fellow cast members also making their Broadway debut with the production. Later that same week, Russell and the cast performed live at the 75th Tony Awards. He appeared on the official cast recording released on 23 September 2022.

Russell performed on the International Tour of West Side Story, directed by Lonny Price. The tour visited countries including Ireland, Japan, India, and Germany, and included a run of 85 performances in Paris seen by 138,385 audience members at the Théâtre du Châtelet from 20 October through 31 December 2023.

In 2024, Russell starred as the lead role of Christopher Boone in the San Diego premiere of the play The Curious Incident of the Dog in the Night-Time. Over 6000 people submitted auditions for the production, and Russell landed the leading role by submitting tapes while overseas on tour in Europe. He received critical acclaim, The San Diego Union-Tribune stating, "Daniel Patrick Russell is flat-out astonishing as Christopher, a role that requires him to be onstage for virtually the entire play and portray extreme levels of emotional and physical trauma, as well as welcome flashes of utter joy." Stage West stated that "His energy, spontaneity and sensitivity to character are off the charts." Russell was awarded the 2024 Craig Noel Award for Outstanding Lead Performance in a Play by the San Diego Theatre Critics Circle. He reprised the role in a remount at the Victoria Gardens Cultural Center in 2025. Russell was awarded a Scenie for his performance, alongside Sutton Foster who was co-awarded in the same category for Once Upon A Mattress.

In 2024 Russell played Travis Keating on the television show FBI.

== Credits ==
=== Stage ===
Year	Title	Role	Notes
2009	Billy Elliot the Musical	Billy	Her Majesty's Theatre, Melbourne
2010–2011	Billy Elliot the Musical	Billy	Broadway Tour
2015	Le Grand Tango	Associate Artist	Sydney Opera House
2015	West Side Story	Baby John	Asolo Repertory Theatre
2016–2018	West Side Story	Baby John	Centennial World Tour
2023–2024	West Side Story	Arab	International Tour
2025	West Side Story	Riff	Fireside Theatre
2021–2023	The Music Man	Swing	Winter Garden Theatre, Broadway
2024	Matilda the Musical	Michael Wormwood	Fireside Theatre
2024	The Curious Incident of the Dog in the Night-Time	Christopher Boone	CCAE Theatricals
2025	The Curious Incident of the Dog in the Night-Time	Christopher Boone	Victoria Gardens Cultural Center

=== Screen ===
Year	Title	Role	Type	Notes
2009	World Keeps Turning	Lead	Music Video	Jetty Road
2011	The Price Is Right	Guest Performer	Television	CBS
2015	Should've Been Us	Lead	Lyric Video	Tori Kelly Vevo
2021	West Side Story	Little Moly	Feature Film	Disney, 20th Century
2022	75th Tony Awards	Performer	Television	CBS
2024	FBI	Travis Keating	Television	CBS

== Awards ==
Year	Award	Category	Project	Result
2022	Theatre World Award	Special award for Outstanding Ensemble	The Music Man	Won
2024	Craig Noel Award	Outstanding Lead Performance in a Play	The Curious Incident of the Dog in the Night-Time	Won
2025	BroadwayWorld Madison Award	Best Supporting Performer In A Musical	West Side Story	Won
2025	Scenie	Performance of the Year in a Presented Production	The Curious Incident of the Dog in the Night-Time	Won

== Personal life ==
Russell has autism spectrum disorder.
