= Church Basement Ladies =

- Church Basement Ladies Logo
- Music: Drew Jansen
- Lyrics: Drew Jansen
- Book: Jim Stowell; Jessica Zuehlke
- Basis: Growing Up Lutheran by Janet Letnes Martin & Suzann Nelson
- Productions: Original musical 2005 Plymouth, Minnesota; 2009 West Coast Premiere; 2025 Plymouth Revival; Sequels; 2008 A Second Helping; 2009 Away in the Basement; 2011 A Mighty Fortress is Our Basement; 2013 The Last (Potluck) Supper; 2016 Rise Up, O Men; 2018 You Smell Barn; 2019 Hark! The Basement Ladies Sing; 2022 Plowin' Thru

Church Basement Ladies is a musical theatre series, based on a musical with book by Jim Stowell and Jessica Zuehlke, music and lyrics by Drew Jansen. The series surrounds a group of women that work in their local church basement cooking meals for religious events and functions.

The original production and subsequent entries in the series are based on the book Growing Up Lutheran by Janet Letnes Martin and Suzann Nelson, published in 1997. In addition to Growing Up Lutheran, Martin and Nelson, under the name of "Those Lutheran Ladies", have written other works, including Growing Up Rural, published in 2017.

A revival of the original musical premiered at The Plymouth Playhouse in Plymouth, Minnesota on July 10, 2025.

== Production history ==
Produced by Troupe America Inc., Curt Wollan, Executive Producer, the first six musicals in the series opened at the Plymouth Playhouse in Plymouth, Minnesota. Installments 7, 8 and 9 opened at the Ames Center in Burnsville, Minnesota.

In addition to touring nationally, the nine musicals have been licensed in all contiguous 48 states and Canada. More than four million audience members have attended the musical and its sequels. On November 18, 2016, the company celebrated its 3000th performance at the Plymouth Playhouse. Original Cast Recordings are available for Church Basement Ladies 1 through 7.

== Synopsis ==
Church Basement Ladies (CBL) is a musical comedy series following the members of a Midwestern church and their relationships as they organize food and solve the problems of their rural Minnesotan town. The setting involves many characters of American-Nordic diaspora, with each of the titular ladies married to a man of Norwegian heritage.

Among those prolific in the church are Vivian Snustad, the eldest Basement Lady and widow, Karin Engleson, mother and renowned cook, Mavis Gilmerson, a farmer's wife, Beverly Signe Engleson, Karin's daughter, and Pastor E.L. Gunderson, the leader of the church and friend to the Ladies.

The series and its entries were non-chronically-produced, though rightsholder and production company In The Basement Productions includes an in-universe chronological timeline on their website.

== Plot ==
=== Act 1 ===
Christmas Dinner
Willie's Funeral

=== Act 2 ===
Hawaiian Easter Dinner
Wedding

== Cast ==
=== Original ===
- Mrs. Lars Snustad (Vivian) - Janet Paone
- Mrs. Gilmer Gilmerson (Mavis) - Greta Grosch
- Mrs. Elroy Engleson (Karin) - Dorian Chalmers
- Signe Engleson (Karin's Daughter) - Ruthie Baker
- Pastor E. L. Gunderson - Tim Drake
- Church Organist - Kyle Nelson

The show's 2009 national tour featured William Christopher as Pastor Gunderson.

=== West Coast Premiere ===
- Mrs. Lars Snustad (Vivian) - Cheryl Morrin
- Mrs. Gilmer Gilmerson (Mavis) - Sherri L. Jones
- Mrs. Elroy Engleson (Karin) - Sheri Shepard
- Signe Engleson (Karin's Daughter) - Christen Dugger
- Pastor E. L. Gunderson - Howard Wilson

=== Sequel Original Cast(s) ===
- Mrs. Lars Snustad (Vivian) - Janet Paone (Sequel 2 and 4 through 9) Roberta Mancina (Sequel 3)
- Mrs. Gilmer Gilmerson (Mavis) - Greta Grosch (Sequel 2 through 9)
- Mrs. Elroy Engleson (Karin) - Dorian Chalmers (Sequel 2 through 9)
- Pastor E. L. Gunderson - Tim Drake (Sequel 2 through 8) Greg Eiden (Sequel 9)
- Beverly Signe Engleson - Tara Borman (Sequel 2 through 5 and 9) Bethany McCade (Sequel 7)
- Other original cast members: Peter Colburn (Sequel 6 and 7), Jeff March (Sequel 6), Michael Lee (Sequel 8)

== Songs ==
Act One

- Closer to Heaven (in the Church Basement) - Pastor and Company
- The Pale Food Polka - Karin and Ladies
- Get Down to Business - Karin and Ladies
- Song For Willie - Pastor and Ladies as Backup
- My Own Personal Island - Mavis
- Dead Spread - Ladies
- Closer to Heaven (Reprise) company

Act Two

- Get Down to Business (Reprise) Karin & Ladies
- The Cities - Vivian and Ladies
- This is Most Certainly True - Karin and Signe
- Sing a New Song - Signe and Ladies
- Mother of the Bride - Mavis and Ladies
- For Good - Vivian
- Sing a New Song (Reprise) - Company

== Sequels ==
The original production spawned a series of subsequent prequel and sequel musicals, with a total of eight as of 2025. (Note: The list provided is sorted chronologically by release date, additionally noting, after the title of the sequel, the year the story takes place in-universe.)

- A Second Helping: The Church Basement Ladies Sequel, 1969. (Music and lyrics by Dennis Curley and Drew Jansen; book by Greta Grosch.) Opened at the Plymouth Playhouse in Plymouth, Minnesota in March 2008, and at the New Theater in Overland Park, Kansas, in late summer 2009. The Kansas production featured Barry Williams as Pastor Gunderson.
- Away in the Basement: A Church Basement Ladies Christmas, 1959. (Music and lyrics by Drew Jansen; book by Greta Grosch.) Opened at the Plymouth Playhouse in November 2009.
- The Church Basement Ladies in: "A Mighty Fortress Is Our Basement", 1960. (Music and lyrics by Drew Jansen; book by Greta Grosch.) Opened at the Plymouth Playhouse in August 2011.
- The Church Basement Ladies in: "The Last (Potluck) Supper", 1979. (Music and lyrics by Drew Jansen; book by Greta Grosch.) Opened at the Plymouth Playhouse in August 2013.
- The Church Basement Ladies in: "Rise Up, O Men", 1964. (Music and lyrics by Dennis Curley; additional lyrics by Greta Grosch; book by Greta Grosch; additional material by Graydon Royce.) Opened at the Plymouth Playhouse in August 2016.
- The Church Basement Ladies in: "You Smell Barn", year not specified, 1950s. (Music by Dennis Curley; lyrics by Dennis Curley and Greta Grosch; book by Greta Grosch.) Opened at the Ames Center in Burnsville, Minnesota on September 12, 2018.
- The Church Basement Ladies in: "Hark! The Basement Ladies Sing", 1960. (Music and lyrics by Michael Pearce Donley; book by Greta Grosch) Opened at the Ames Center on November 1, 2019
- The Church Basement Ladies in: "Plowin' Thru", 1975. (Music and lyrics by Dennis Curley; book by Greta Grosch) Opened at the Ames Center on September 7, 2022.
