= Burnsville, Minnesota =

City in Minnesota, United States

Burnsville
- City
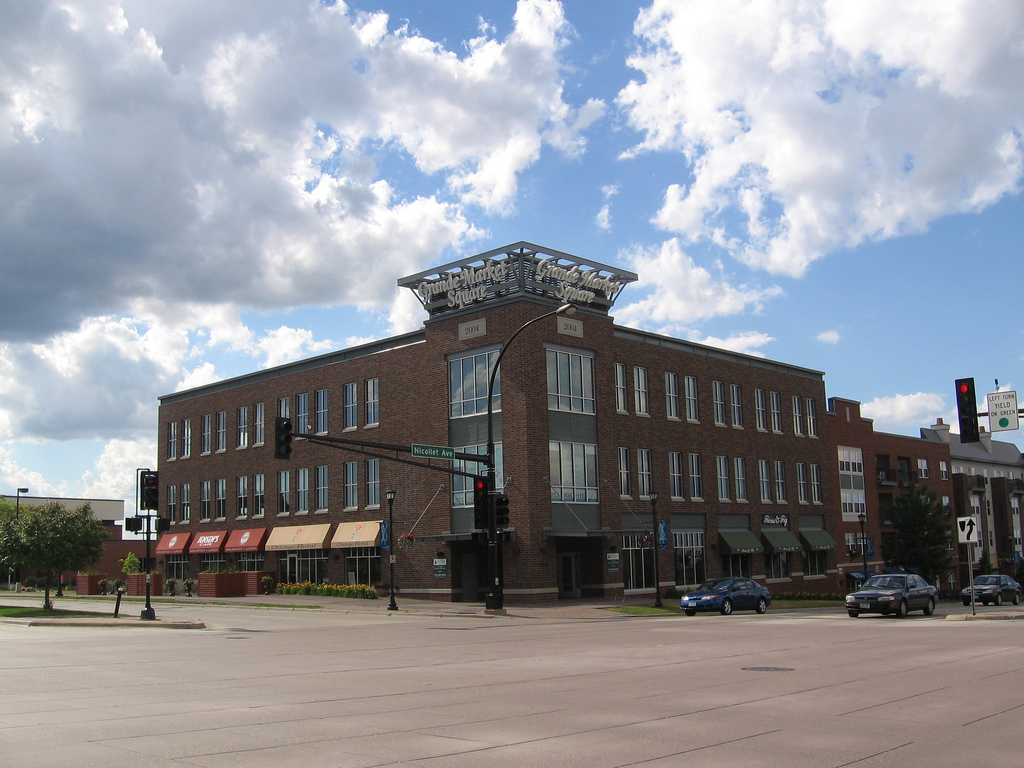
- Grande Market Square at Nicollet Avenue and Burnsville Parkway is the cornerstone of the Heart of the City project.
- Nickname: South of the River
- Location of the city of Burnsville within Dakota County, Minnesota
- Coordinates: 44°46′04″N 93°16′39″W
- Country: United States
- State: Minnesota
- County: Dakota
- Founded: 1855
- Established: 1858
- Incorporated: 1964

Government
  - Type: Mayor-council government – Executive form
  - Mayor: Elizabeth Kautz
  - City Manager: Gregg Lindberg

Area
  - City: 26.98 sq mi (69.89 km^{2})
  - Land: 24.94 sq mi (64.59 km^{2})
  - Water: 2.05 sq mi (5.30 km^{2})
- Elevation: 974 ft (297 m)

Population (2020)
  - City: 64,317
  - Estimate (2022): 63,936
  - Rank: US: 603rd MN: 14th
  - Density: 2,579.2/sq mi (995.82/km^{2})
  - Metro: 3,693,729 (US: 16th)
- Time zone: UTC−6 (Central (CST))
  - Summer (DST): UTC−5 (CDT)
- ZIP Codes: 55306, 55337
- Area code: 952
- FIPS code: 27-08794
- GNIS feature ID: 0640669
- Website: burnsvillemn.gov

Burnsville (/ˈbɜːrnzvɪl/ BURNZ-vil) is a city 15 miles (24 km) south of downtown Minneapolis in Dakota County, Minnesota. The city is situated on a bluff overlooking the south bank of the Minnesota River, upstream from its confluence with the Mississippi River. Burnsville and nearby suburbs form the southern portion of Minneapolis–Saint Paul, the 16th-largest metropolitan statistical area in the United States, with about 3.7 million residents. At the 2020 census the population was 64,317.

The name Burnsville is attributed to an early Irish settler and land owner, William Byrne. His surname was recorded as "Burns" and was never corrected.

Burnsville stands on land that once contained a village of Mdewakanton Dakota. Later, it became a rural Irish farming community. Burnsville grew rapidly following the construction of Interstate 35, becoming Minnesota's 14th-largest city in the 2020 census. Now the ninth-largest suburb in the metro area and a bedroom community of both Minneapolis and Saint Paul, it was fully built by the late 2000s. Burnsville's downtown area is called Heart of the City with urban-style retail and condominiums. The Burnsville Transit Station serves as the hub and headquarters of the Minnesota Valley Transit Authority, providing regional bus service to five other suburbs.

Burnsville is home to a regional mall (Burnsville Center), a section of Murphy-Hanrehan Park Reserve, 310-foot (94 m) vertical ski peak Buck Hill, and part of the Minnesota Valley National Wildlife Refuge.

== History ==
The Mdewakanton Dakota were the earliest inhabitants, arriving by the Minnesota River, following water fowl and game animals. Around 1750, as part of the greater migration of the Mdewakanton from their ancestral area around Mille Lacs Lake to the confluence of the Minnesota and Mississippi Rivers, Chief Black Dog established his band at a permanent village at the isthmus between Black Dog Lake (which is named after him) and the Minnesota River, near the present site of the Black Dog Power Plant. Early settlers reported the village's population as over 250 Dakota. At the south end of Burnsville, Crystal Lake, recorded as "Minne Elk", was used for fishing, leisure and burial. It was also a gathering spot where Dakota watched deer or bucks drink at the lake from the top of Buck Hill, which was named by early settlers who witnessed this activity. Three large burial mounds were discovered after European settlement.

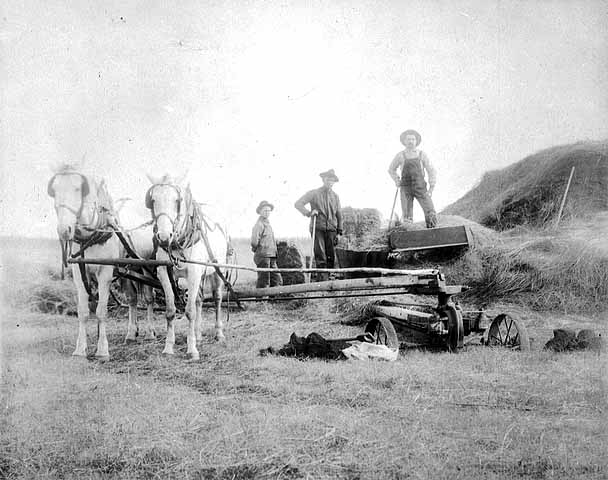
Baling straw with horses circa 1900

The Dakota nation ceded land in 1851 and many relocated to Chief Shakopee's village—the Shakopee-Mdewakanton Indian Reservation in nearby Prior Lake. The first European settlers were Irish, Scottish and Norwegian farmers who came upriver from Saint Paul. One of these was William Byrne, who had immigrated in 1840 from County Kilkenny, Ireland to Hamilton, Ontario, Canada. In 1855, he settled at the present-day junction of County Road 34 and Judicial Road near the Scott County line, just southeast of old downtown Savage. He subsequently donated land there for a church, school, and a cemetery, and served as town chairman. In 1858, the Dakota County Board authorized Burnsville Township in the north by the Minnesota River, east by Eagan and Apple Valley, south by Lakeville, and west by Scott County. There is some ambiguity about whether the name actually derived from Byrne, since there were people with the surname "Burns" (a Scottish variant) living in the area. The town clerk recorded variations between "Burns" and "Byrne", but at the 1960s city incorporation, "Burnsville" prevailed. The school district was organized during this time as well. Burnsville originally comprised the present-day downtown of Savage (then known as Hamilton) until county border revisions by the legislature. Irish and Scottish settlers left their names on many area roads and parks and their religion in Presbyterian, Protestant, and Catholic churches.

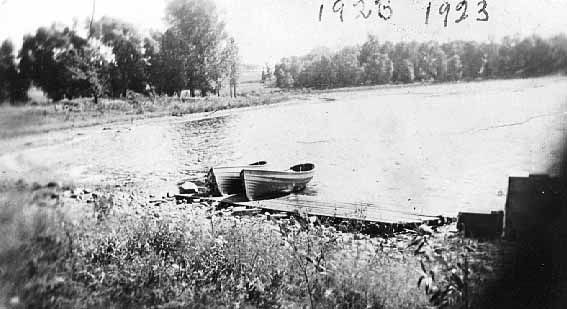
Lewis Judd established the Lakeside Hotel on the north shore of Crystal Lake in 1880. The resort included boats for rent.

In the 19th century, Burnsville was considered far from downtown Minneapolis. Rail access came in 1864 and Burnsville became a resort town, with cottages along Crystal Lake as well as Orchard Lake and Marion Lake in nearby Lakeville. The Bloomington Ferry provided river crossings until 1889 when the original Bloomington Ferry Bridge was built. By 1920, the Lyndale Avenue Drawbridge opened next to Black Dog Lake, extending Minneapolis's first north-south highway to the rural communities of southern Minnesota. Later, the bridge, upgraded several times, was replaced by the I-35W Minnesota River bridge. In 1950, just before the World War II postwar housing boom, Burnsville was still a quiet township with a population of 583. School was taught in a one-room schoolhouse containing eight grades.

After the arrival of Interstate 35W in 1960, the next two decades saw the largest boom in population when postwar pressures forced the community to develop at rapid pace. Byrnesville Township was officially incorporated in 1964 after defeating an annexation attempt by the city of Bloomington. Mass housing development followed and former mayor Connie Morrison has said city managers had foresight in producing shopping nodes in walking distance of most homes. The city became a regional pull when Burnsville Center opened in 1977 and produced the heavily traveled retail strip on County Road 42. The next decades dealt with managing Burnsville's increasing population and growth which led to providing alternative transportation options, diverse housing projects, and ultimately the "Heart of the City" project. The city approached build-out in the late 1990s and changed focus from new development to redevelopment and rehabilitation of existing structures.

Descendants of the Byrne family still remain in greater Minnesota, with the original spelling in their surname. A relative who dedicated William Byrne Elementary in the 1960s considered petitioning to correct the spelling but most of the family had moved away for several decades.

== Geography ==
Fed by receding glaciers and Lake Agassiz 12,000 years ago, the Glacial River Warren carved today's Minnesota River valley. On Burnsville's northern border, the Minnesota River winds through marshland and flood plains toward its confluence with the Mississippi. Most of the river is in the Minnesota Valley National Wildlife Refuge with fish, wildlife, and parkland managed collectively by the U.S. Fish and Wildlife Service and the Minnesota Department of Natural Resources. Burnsville also contains the Black Dog and Lower Minnesota River Watershed Districts, managed by the Dakota County Soil and Water Conservation District.

According to the U.S. Census Bureau, the city has an area of 26.93 square miles (69.75 km^{2}), of which 24.91 square miles (64.52 km^{2}) is land and 2.02 square miles (5.23 km^{2}) is water.

Interstate Highway 35 splits into Interstate Highways 35W and 35E within the city. Other routes in the city include Minnesota Highway 13 and County Road 42.

== Demographics ==
Historical population
Census	Pop.	Note	%±
1860	214		—
1870	361		68.7%
1880	388		7.5%
1890	309		−20.4%
1900	358		15.9%
1910	385		7.5%
1920	419		8.8%
1930	490		16.9%
1940	495		1.0%
1950	583		17.8%
1960	2,716		365.9%
1970	19,940		634.2%
1980	35,674		78.9%
1990	51,288		43.8%
2000	60,220		17.4%
2010	60,306		0.1%
2020	64,317		6.7%
2022 (est.)	63,936		−0.6%
U.S. Decennial Census; 2020 Census

The earliest settlers were roughly 250 Mdewakanton Dakota who lived permanently at Black Dog camp. Starting in the 1850s, Old stock Americans from the east coast and French Canadians moved into eastern Dakota County near Saint Paul. A decade later, major European immigration began with settlers from Ireland, Scotland, and Great Britain. By the 1900s there were a few Scandinavians from Sweden, Norway, and Denmark, but these ethnic groups were mostly concentrated near Lakeville. Those from Germany and Eastern Europe gradually joined the minority from the packing jobs in nearby South St. Paul. Irish descendants maintained the majority through the early 1950s owing to the town's origin, overall land ownership, and the practice of marrying within ethnic clans. The early 20th century's permanent population remained very low as the Minnesota River's lack of bridges and streetcar connection isolated the area from development, preventing people from moving south of the river. The lakeside houses around Crystal Lake and Orchard Lake attracted various immigrant and first-generation wealthier people to temporarily settle or own land in the town limits.

In 1960, the U.S. Census Bureau recorded the population of Byrnesville Township at 2,716 and soon after, the postwar growth was dramatic, filling the city with second- to third-generation European descendants from Minneapolis. From 1960 to 1970, the population rose to nearly 20,000 and by 2000, the population was roughly 60,000.

=== Racial and ethnic composition ===
Burnsville, Minnesota – Racial and ethnic composition Note: the US Census treats Hispanic/Latino as an ethnic category. This table excludes Latinos from the racial categories and assigns them to a separate category. Hispanics/Latinos may be of any race.
Race / ethnicity (NH = Non-Hispanic)	Pop 2000	Pop 2010	Pop 2020	% 2000	% 2010	% 2020
White alone (NH)	51,952	44,563	39,487	86.27%	73.89%	61.39%
Black or African American alone (NH)	2,433	5,926	9,852	4.04%	9.83%	15.32%
Native American or Alaska Native alone (NH)	244	175	220	0.41%	0.29%	0.34%
Asian alone (NH)	2,433	3,020	3,631	4.04%	5.01%	5.65%
Pacific Islander alone (NH)	40	46	55	0.07%	0.08%	0.09%
Other race alone (NH)	129	132	379	0.21%	0.22%	0.59%
Mixed-race or multiracial (NH)	1,264	1,688	3,025	2.10%	2.80%	4.70%
Hispanic or Latino (any race)	1,725	4,756	7,668	2.86%	7.89%	11.92%
Total	60,220	60,306	64,317	100.00%	100.00%	100.00%

=== 2020 census ===
As of the 2020 census, Burnsville had a population of 64,317. The median age was 37.2 years. 22.7% of residents were under the age of 18 and 15.7% of residents were 65 years of age or older. For every 100 females there were 95.9 males, and for every 100 females age 18 and over there were 93.8 males age 18 and over.

100.0% of residents lived in urban areas, while 0.0% lived in rural areas.

There were 25,480 households in Burnsville, of which 28.8% had children under the age of 18 living in them. Of all households, 46.2% were married-couple households, 18.3% were households with a male householder and no spouse or partner present, and 27.8% were households with a female householder and no spouse or partner present. About 28.0% of all households were made up of individuals and 10.6% had someone living alone who was 65 years of age or older.

There were 26,386 housing units, of which 3.4% were vacant. The homeowner vacancy rate was 0.6% and the rental vacancy rate was 4.6%.

Racial composition as of the 2020 census
Race	Number	Percent
White	40,441	62.9%
Black or African American	9,979	15.5%
American Indian and Alaska Native	391	0.6%
Asian	3,668	5.7%
Native Hawaiian and Other Pacific Islander	64	0.1%
Some other race	4,479	7.0%
Two or more races	5,295	8.2%
Hispanic or Latino (of any race)	7,668	11.9%

=== 2010 census ===
As of the census of 2010, there were 60,306 people, 24,283 households, and 15,656 families residing in the city. The population density was 2,421.0 inhabitants per square mile (934.8/km^{2}). There were 25,759 housing units at an average density of 1,034.1 per square mile (399.3/km^{2}). The racial makeup of the city was 77.5% White, 10.0% African American, 0.4% Native American, 5.0% Asian, 0.1% Pacific Islander, 3.5% from other races, and 3.5% from two or more races. Hispanic or Latino people of any race were 7.9% of the population.

There were 24,283 households, of which 32.1% had children under 18 living with them, 48.4% were married couples living together, 11.5% had a female householder with no husband present, 4.6% had a male householder with no wife present, and 35.5% were non-families. 27.6% of all households were made up of individuals, and 8% had someone living alone who was 65 or older. The average household size was 2.47 and the average family size was 3.03.

The median age in the city was 35.9. 11% of residents were under the age of 18; 9% were between 18 and 24; 28.6% were from 25 to 44; 26.7% were from 45 to 64; and 11.7% were 65 or older. The gender makeup of the city was 48.7% male and 51.3% female.

== Economy ==
Burnsville's biggest employer is its school district, Independent School District 191, followed by Fairview Ridges Hospital, UTAS Sensor Systems, Northern Tool + Equipment, Pepsi-Cola Bottling, YRC, Mackin Educational Resources, Cub Foods, Frontier Communications, and AMS Holding. Manufacturing is the second-largest industry. Many employers, including Abdallah Candies and UTC Aerospace Systems, are in the industrial areas in the southwest and the north, with corporate headquarters and modern warehouses in services and manufacturing. Service firms such as internet utilities, news, and real estate are mostly located throughout the north along Highway 13.

Retail shopping is along County Road 42 and Highway 13 in the west and east sections of the city with local shopping nodes positioned throughout. The largest strip, County Road 42, is lined with suburban strip malls, restaurants, goods and grocery stores. The anchor of the strip, Burnsville Center, is a 1,275,703-square-foot (118,516.7 m^{2}) regional mall.

Burnsville is a 15- to 30-minute drive from many regional attractions and services, such as the Mall of America, Valleyfair Amusement Park, Buck Hill Ski Area, the Minneapolis–St. Paul International Airport, downtown Saint Paul and downtown Minneapolis. Adjacent cities of Apple Valley, Bloomington, Eagan, Lakeville, and Savage provide even more shopping hubs, lakes and parks.

=== Heart of the City ===
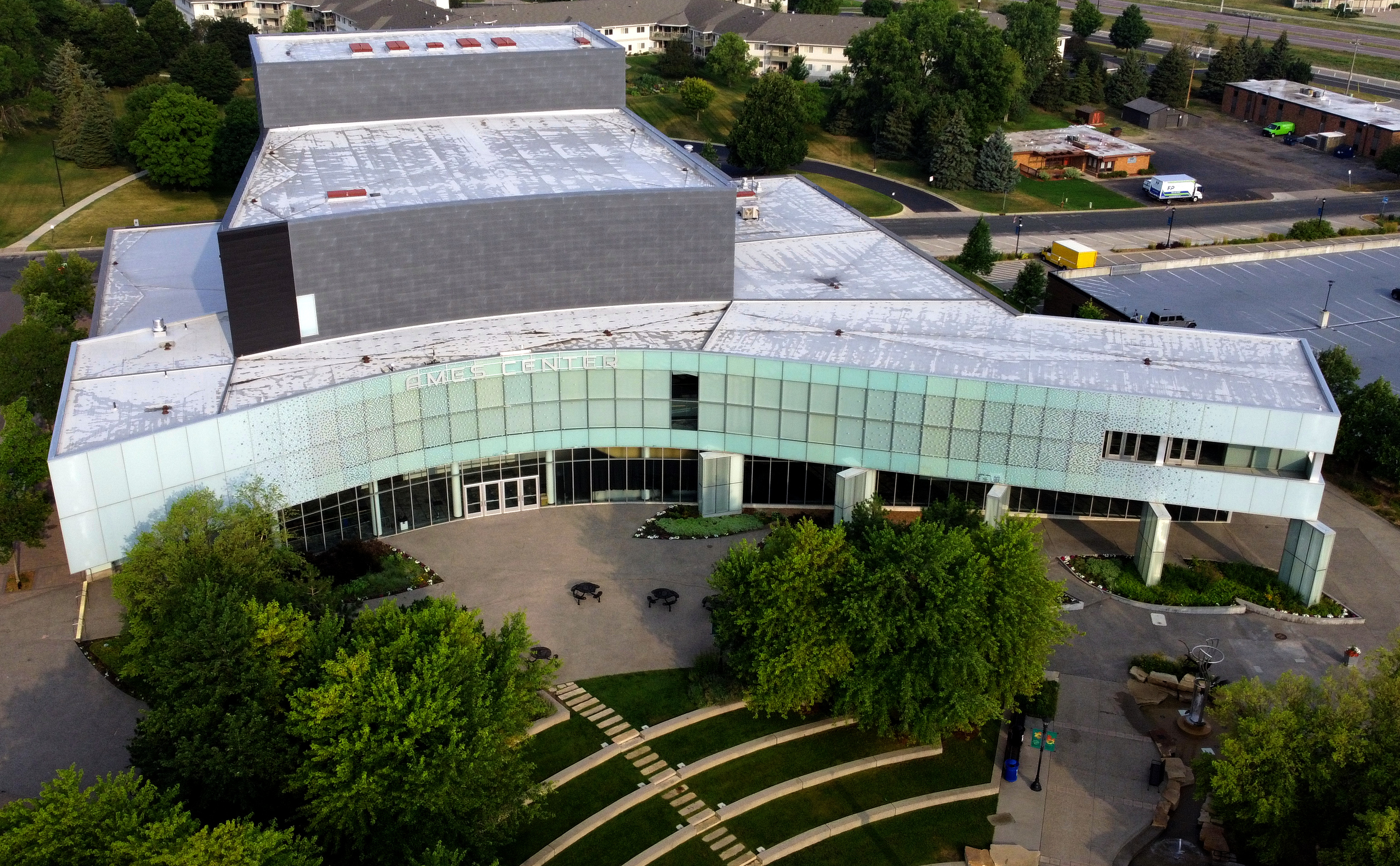
Ames Center in the Heart of the City

Burnsville's "Heart of the City" project is a downtown development policy driven by smart growth and new urbanism. The redevelopment encompasses 54 acres (220,000 m^{2}) in central Burnsville, a few miles south of the Minnesota River.

The 1150-seat postmodern Burnsville Performing Arts Center, now The Ames Performing Arts Center, opened in January 2009. Its approval in 2007 was controversial. Grande Market Square at Nicollet Avenue and Burnsville Parkway is the cornerstone of the Heart of the City project, and features a Doron Jensen-signature restaurant.

== Arts and culture ==
The Ames Performing Arts Center is at 12600 Nicollet Avenue in the Heart of the City. The center has two theatres, a 1000-seat Proscenium Stage, and an art gallery.

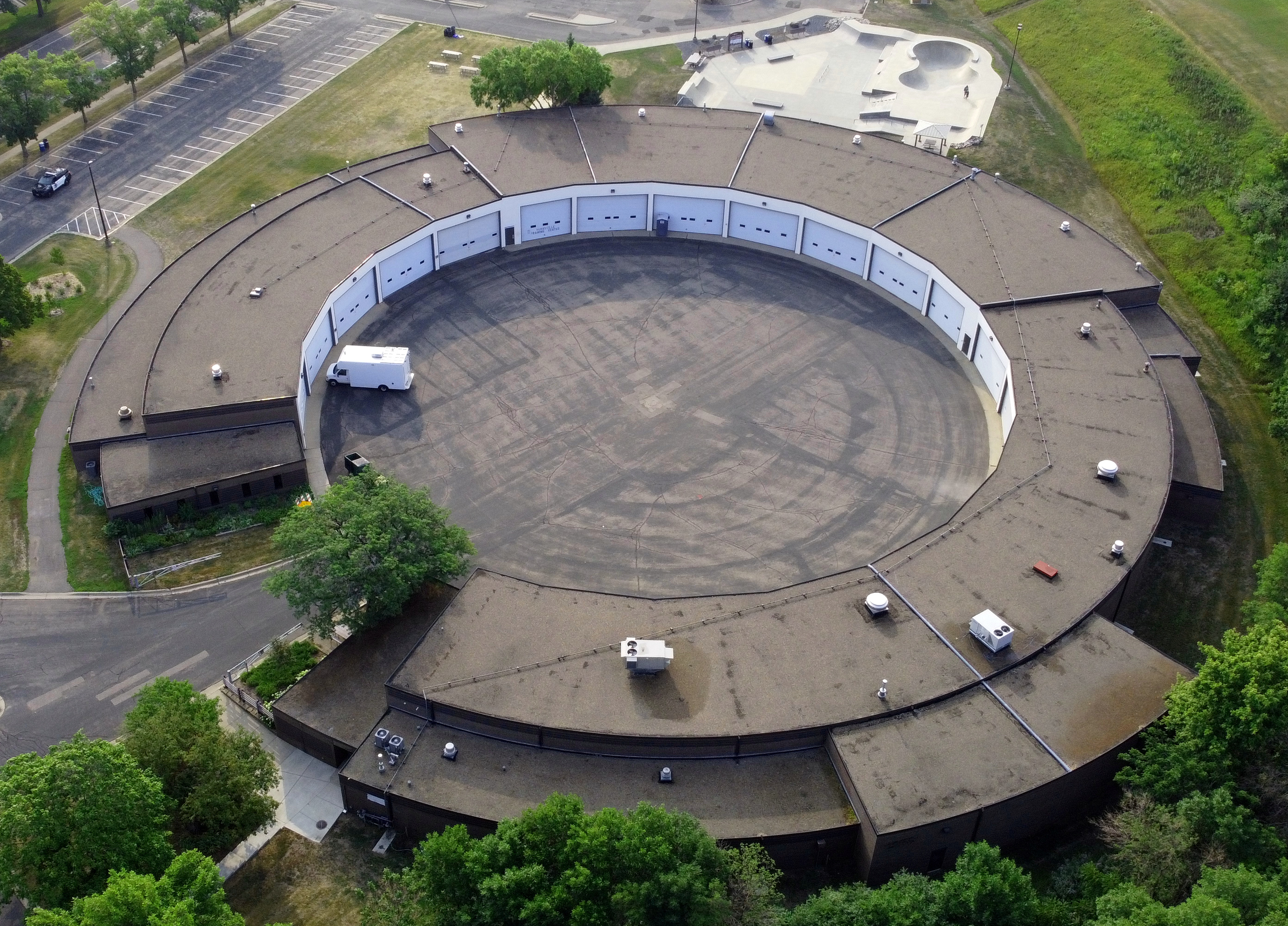
The Garage Burnsville

The Garage located near City Hall is a nonprofit music club and teen center that has attracted music acts nationally and internationally.

Annually every August or September, the community holds the Burnsville Fire Muster. Established in 1980, the event originated in the 1970s as a showcase and short parade for a local fire equipment collector. Taking on the New England fire muster tradition, the event now includes a large parade, music concerts, and fireworks. In 2004, the Guinness Book of World Records cited the namesake event of this celebration, a fire truck parade, as the longest of its kind in the world at that time.

== Parks and recreation ==
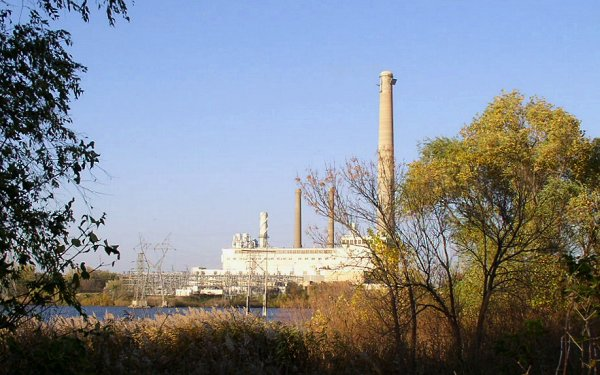
Land around Black Dog Power Plant is recreational, including Mel Larson Field, the BAC's football only field.

The city contains 1,800 acres (7.3 km^{2}) of parkland throughout 79 parks and is managed by the Burnsville Parks Department, which follows a Parks & Trails Master Plan. Only a third is developed and for recreation, with the remainder preserved as natural habitat. Burnsville's border with the Minnesota River is within the Minnesota Valley National Wildlife Refuge. Crystal Lake is the city's major recreation lake, allowing boating, fishing, jet-skiing, and swimming. Burnsville Skate Park is a free facility during summer hours. Burnsville Ice Center has two large professional ice rinks.

Burnsville Athletic Club is an all-volunteer youth sports league. It has an annual participation of nearly 1,300 in the baseball leagues for grades K-12, 80–90 boys' basketball teams in grades 3–12, and over 400 in flag and tackle American football in grades 2–8. There are also traveling teams for boys' and girls' basketball, girls' fast pitch softball, and 8th grade boys' football, which play against similar teams from around the state at a higher competitive level. Other adult sports are provided through the city's recreation department, other recreational organizations, and minor league groups.

Burnsville has over 58 playgrounds and roughly 11 recreational lakes. The most heavily used lakes are Keller Lake, Crystal Lake, Kruse Lake, and Aligmanet Lake (split with Burnsville's neighbor Apple Valley, MN). In mid-2021, after finding numerous large goldfish in Keller Lake, Burnsville warned residents against public goldfish release, citing ecological concerns (goldfish are a regulated invasive species in Minnesota and their release into public waters is illegal).

== Government and politics ==
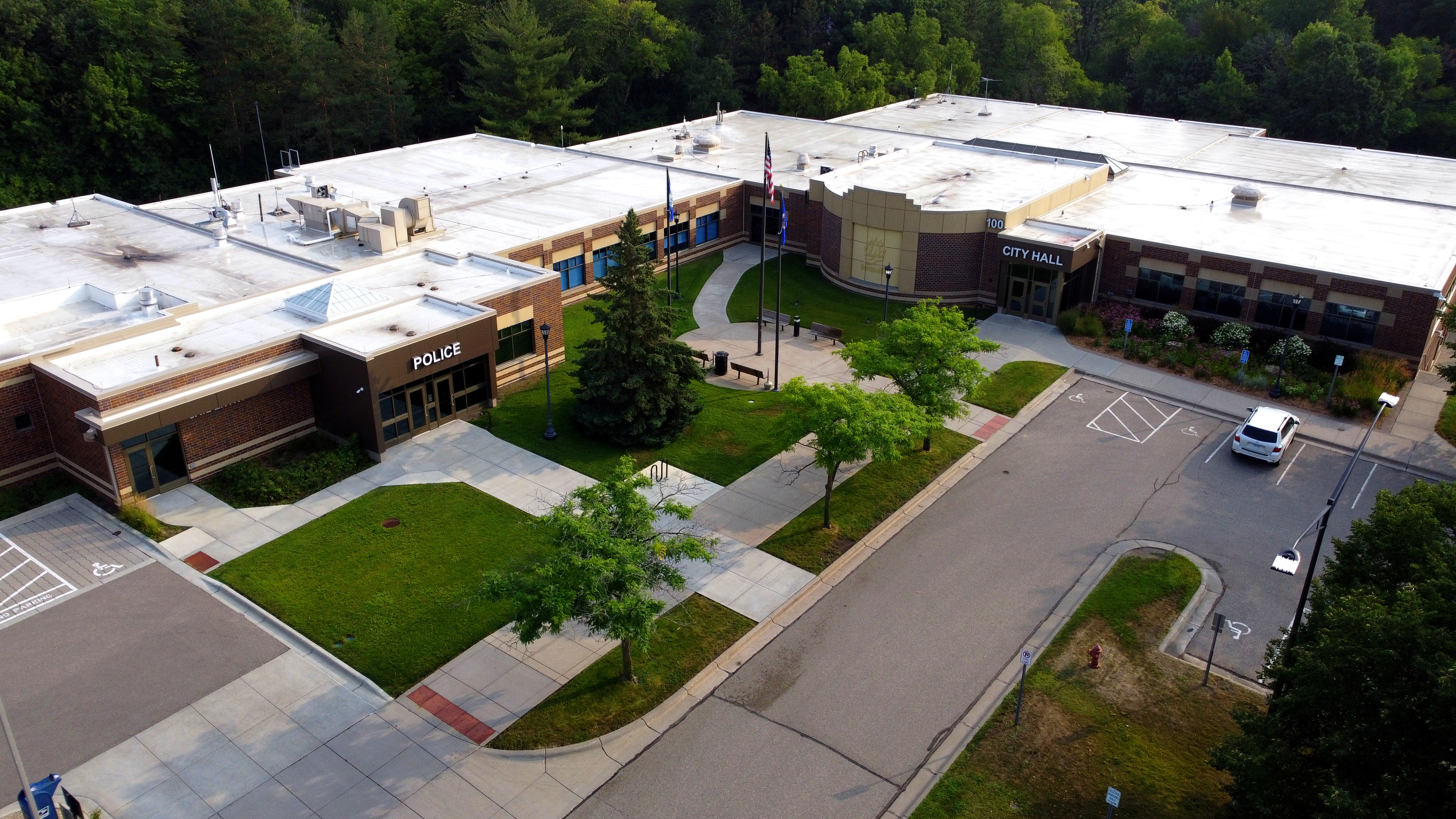
Burnsville City Hall

Burnsville operates as a Statutory Plan B city under the Minnesota Legislature. Government consists of an elected city council of one executive mayor and four council members. All four council members are elected at-large to serve four-year terms. The mayor's term was changed from two to four years in 2000. The city manager is in charge of administrative duties, including employment of the city. As one of many Minneapolis–Saint Paul metropolitan municipalities, the city is required to regularly submit a Comprehensive Plan detailing infrastructure and development progress to the Metropolitan Council.

Elizabeth Kautz has been mayor since 1995, elected after serving two years on the city council, where she replaced Ken Wolf, who was elected to the State House of Representatives in District 41B. Having been reelected eight times, she has served for over 27 years. Kautz's framework of progressive activity and financial management has been studied academically. She cites in her biography that she has reduced Burnsville's debt, increased infrastructure improvement, maintained the scheduled property tax decrease, established a new youth center, and overseen the establishment of the Minnesota Valley Transit Authority.

One of Kautz's major redevelopment projects was the Burnsville Heart of the City, the intersecting commercial areas near Burnsville Parkway and Nicollet Avenue. In the 2008 mayoral election, her opponent cited the 1,000-seat regional performing arts center component as misuse of public funds toward arts.

The city is in multiple districts in both the Minnesota Senate (52, 55) and Minnesota House (52A, 55A, 55B). Burnsville is represented in the State Senate by Jim Carlson (District 52, DFL) and Lindsey Port (District 55, DFL), and in the State House by Sandra Masin (District 52A, DFL), Jessica Hanson (District 55A, DFL), and Kaela Berg (District 55B, DFL).

Burnsville is in Minnesota's 2nd congressional district and is represented by Angie Craig, a Democrat.

=== List of mayors ===
Number	Mayor	Party	Term begins	Term ends	Notes	Ref.
1	Roger Richardson	Non-partisan	1964	1966	Helped lead fight against annexation into Bloomington	
2	Alfred Hall	Non-partisan	January 1966	January 1970	Mormon bishop, fought to make Burnsville dry.	
3	Donald Holmes	Non-partisan	January 1970	March 1970	Resigned after just three months	
-	Alfred Hall	Non-partisan	March 1970	1974	Selected by city council to serve the remainder of Holmes' term, village elevated to city	
4	Peter Ochsner	Non-partisan	1974	1979	City doubled in size to become 13th largest in state, lost re-election bid	
5	Paul Scheunemann	Non-partisan	1979	1983	First mayor to win re-election. Strongly resisted job-growth insisting Burnsville remain a bedroom community.	
6	Connie Morrison	Republican	1983	1986	Later elected to the State House from 1987 to 1994	
7	Dan McElroy	Republican	1986	1993	Resigned to take a position in Governor Arne Carlson's administration	
-	Ken Wolf	Republican	1993	1993	Served as interim mayor, later elected to State House from 1993 to 2002	
-	Dan McElroy	Republican	1993	1995	Returned to his office, would go on to be elected to the State House from 1995 to 2002	
8	Elizabeth Kautz	Republican	1995	Present	68th president of the United States Conference of Mayors	

== Politics ==
Presidential election results

2020 precinct results spreadsheet2016 precinct results spreadsheet2012 precinct results spreadsheet2008 precinct results spreadsheet2004 precinct results spreadsheet2000 precinct results spreadsheet1996 precinct results1992 precinct results1988 precinct results1984 precinct results1980 precinct results1976 precinct results1968 precinct results1964 precinct results1960 precinct results
Year	Republican	Democratic	Third parties
2024	37.9% 12,337	58.6% 19,075	3.5% 1,127
2020	37.4% 13,179	60.1% 21,171	2.5% 885
2016	39.7% 13,011	51.4% 16,833	8.9% 2,902
2012	45.3% 15,326	52.5% 17,778	2.2% 756
2008	45.2% 14,931	53.1% 17,552	1.7% 561
2004	50.1% 16,400	48.9% 15,996	1.0% 345
2000	49.0% 14,490	45.5% 13,469	5.5% 1,634
1996	42.0% 10,760	47.4% 12,140	10.6% 2,736
1992	36.5% 10,271	37.2% 10,452	26.3% 7,390
1988	57.2% 12,949	42.8% 9,672	0.0% 0
1984	62.3% 11,922	37.7% 7,200	0.0% 0
1980	51.1% 8,635	37.0% 6,245	11.9% 2,013
1976	56.9% 8,324	41.6% 6,095	1.5% 223
1968	51.3% 3,165	45.0% 2,772	3.7% 230
1964	43.3% 1,500	56.6% 1,960	0.1% 3

== Education ==
Burnsville Independent School District 191, which includes Burnsville as well as parts of neighboring cities Savage and Eagan, has:

Two 9–12 high schools:

- Burnsville High School
- Cedar Alternative High School

Three 6–8 middle schools:

- Eagle Ridge Middle School (in Savage)
- John Metcalf Middle School (closed in 2020)
- Joseph Nicollet Middle School

Ten K-5 elementary schools:

- Harriet Bishop (in Savage)
- Edward D. Neill
- Gideon Pond
- Hidden Valley (in Savage)
- Marion W. Savage (in Savage)
- Rahn (in Eagan)
- Sioux Trail
- Sky Oaks
- Vista View
- William Byrne

About 20% of Burnsville's students attend Independent School District 196 schools; they include Apple Valley High School and Valley Middle School in Apple Valley; and Echo Park Elementary School in Burnsville.

About 10% of Burnsville's students attend Independent School District 194 schools; they include Lakeville North High School, Kenwood Trail Middle School, and Orchard Lake Elementary, all of which are in Lakeville.

Good Shepherd Lutheran School is a Pre-K-8 Christian school of the Wisconsin Evangelical Lutheran Synod in Burnsville.

== Infrastructure ==
Burnsville is a fully developed suburban bedroom community. Large pockets of ramblers and split-level houses were due to Interstate 35W's completion in the 1960s which came earlier than most of the metro highways. Burnsville through the 1990s filled in the last of its available land with upscale housing stock and apartment complexes. In the 2000s Burnsville went under redevelopment activity, producing many four-story residential buildings. The "Heart of the City", a new downtown area, contains mixed-use residential and retail buildings. This has produced a diverse range of housing types from single-family homes to high-density condominiums. Since the city was developed in a sprawl fashion, new and old buildings sit between each other. The original industrial area along the Minnesota River is mostly abandoned, and also contains a sealed land-fill site. The new industrial area in the west side of the city contains manufacturing and corporate headquarters. West of the new downtown area are new office buildings.

Since 2005, Burnsville has cut its carbon emissions by almost 30%, through changes such as energy efficiency, composting to reduce methane emissions from landfills, and improvements to water infrastructure.

=== Transportation ===
Minnesota Valley Transit Authority provides regional bus service between many transit hubs within the city, south of the river, and to destinations such as the Mall of America, Downtown Minneapolis, and Southdale Mall. Most residents commute and move around by car. Burnsville contains the Interstate Highway 35 split with Interstate Highway 35W leading to downtown Minneapolis and Interstate Highway 35E to downtown St. Paul. The major on and off-ramps for I-35W are located at Burnsville Parkway, County Road 42, and State Highway 13. County Road 42 and State Highway 13 both provide east–west access to the western suburb of Savage and the eastern suburbs of Eagan and Apple Valley. Major interior arteries include Nicollet Avenue, McAndrews Road (East 138th Street), County Road 5 (Kenwood Trail), County Road 11, Portland Avenue, Southcross Drive, and Lac Lavon Drive. The Dan Patch Corridor is planned to serve Burnsville.

=== Utilities ===
Burnsville Public Works draws water from wells and not the Minnesota River, supplying all homes and businesses. Electricity is provided by Dakota Electric Association, Minnesota Valley Electric Cooperative and Xcel Energy. Natural gas is provided by Centerpoint Minnegasco. Telephone and internet services are provided by Frontier Communications and Qwest.

Fairview Ridges Hospital located south of City Hall along Nicollet Avenue is a 24-hour facility, touting the most advanced emergency, surgery, orthopedic and childcare south of the river. The hospital is within The Ridges campus which includes various medical clinics, services, centers and institutes. Nearby is a Park Nicollet Health Services.

=== Law enforcement ===
Burnsville's law enforcement is provided by the Burnsville Police Department, which formed in July 1964 soon after the town's incorporation. The department consists of 75 sworn officers and 19 civilian personnel. The current chief of police, as of May 10, 2019, is Tanya Schwartz. The department was the first in the state of Minnesota to introduce body-worn cameras to its officers in the summer of 2010 and rolled them out to all officers by the end of 2011. The department's current police station was built in 1988 and is located at 100 Civic Center Parkway. The station underwent a major $13.3 million renovation starting in summer 2017, and the newly renovated station was re-opened in February 2018.

== Notable people ==
- Cole Aldrich, former basketball player for the Minnesota Timberwolves; born in Burnsville, but moved to Bloomington at a young age
- Brock Boeser, professional hockey player, plays for the Vancouver Canucks of the National Hockey League
- J.T. Brown, professional hockey player, went on to play for the Minnesota Wild of the National Hockey League
- Alex Call, professional baseball player, plays for the Los Angeles Dodgers of Major League Baseball
- Dropping Daylight, music band
- Breanne Düren, singer/songwriter, touring keyboardist for Owl City
- Durry, indie rock band from by Austin and Taryn Durry
- Sara Groves, contemporary Christian music artist
- Chuck Halberg, lawyer and Minnesota state legislator
- Gao Hong, Chinese pipa player
- Ernie Hudson, actor
- Doron Jensen, founder of Timber Lodge Steakhouse
- Cayla Kluver, author
- David Knutson, Minnesota state senator, lawyer, and judge
- Harold A. Knutson, Minnesota state legislator and lawyer
- Kristina Koznick, former World Cup ski racer
- M.A. Larson, screenwriter and author
- Trevor Laws, former American football defensive tackle for the Philadelphia Eagles and St. Louis Rams
- Connie Morrison, Minnesota state legislator, member of the Burnsville City Council, and mayor of Burnsville
- Todd Okerlund, former New York Islander hockey player, son of "Mean" Gene Okerlund
- Kirsten Olson, ice skater and actress
- Laura Osnes, Broadway singer and actress, born in Burnsville and raised in Eagan
- Melissa Peterman, actress
- Tabitha Peterson, curler
- Bradley G. Pieper, Minnesota state legislator and businessman
- Duke Powell, Minnesota state legislator and paramedic
- Mikayla Raines, animal rescuer and rehabilitator, and YouTuber
- James Ruffin, defensive lineman
- Randy Scheunemann, Washington lobbyist and John McCain presidential campaign adviser
- Sing It Loud, music band
- Dan Stoneking, journalist and Minneapolis Star sports editor
- Lindsey Vonn (née Kildow), U.S. Ski Team alpine ski racer, 2008 World Cup overall champion
- Nicolas Eugene Walsh, Roman Catholic bishop
- Cedric Yarbrough, actor
