= Abdallah Candies =

Chocolatier and confectionery in Apple Valley, Minnesota

Coordinates: 44°44′45″N 93°19′28″W

Abdallah Candies, Inc.
- Founded: 1909 in Minneapolis, Minnesota
- Founder: Albert Abdallah
- Headquarters: Apple Valley, Minnesota, US
- Key people: Steve Hegedus, CEO
- Products: Fine chocolates and candies
- Website: www.abdallahcandies.com

Abdallah Candies is a fifth-generation, family-owned chocolatier and confectionery in Apple Valley, Minnesota, United States. It was established as the Calhoun Candy Depot in Minneapolis in 1909 by Lebanese immigrant Albert Abdallah and his wife of Swedish descent, Helen Trovall. The company was renamed Abdallah Candy Company in 1916.

== History ==
In the early years, Albert made candy in a copper kettle over an open flame, working from recipes purchased from a local salesman. His recipes for caramels, toffee, truffles and assorted chocolates are still used by the company today.

In the 1930s, in addition to candy and ice cream, the store featured a 200-seat restaurant. In February 1935, Abdallah's was forced into bankruptcy and closed due to the Great Depression. After two years, Albert paid back his creditors and opened a smaller store a few blocks from the original, focusing on candy and ice cream.

In 1951, Abdallah's opened a new factory on 38th Street and Cedar Ave in Minneapolis. With this expansion, Abdallah's began to focus on wholesale sales. Albert retired from the business in 1961, turning over the business to his son-in-law, Glenn Oletzke, who was married to Albert's daughter Marie. In 1964, a fire caused by a gasoline truck explosion outside the factory forced them to rebuild.

In 1966, Abdallah Candies opened a new facility with a gift store in Burnsville. Marie and her daughter, Vicke (Oletzke) Hegedus, operated the gift store. Glenn retired in 1974, leaving the business to his son, James, and Vicke's husband, Stephen Hegedus. The wholesale business began to expand, first regionally, then nationwide. In 1987, James retired and Stephen's son, Steven Hegedus, joined the company. Steven became president in 2002.

After expanding sales nationwide, the company needed additional space and established its headquarters in Burnsville in 1998. In 2016, the company expanded further and moved production to Apple Valley. As of 2021, Abdallah Candies operates exclusively in Apple Valley.

The company celebrated its 100th anniversary in 2010, after which Stephen and Vicke retired.

== Products ==
Abdallah Candies produces more than 20,000 pounds of candy each day. Nearly 1 million caramel apples are produced during September and October and sold locally and online. The company developed a caramel apple-dipping machine to replace the labor-intense, hand-dipping process; the machine coats 4,000 apples an hour.

Abdallah Candies sells to approximately 7,000, mostly wholesale, customers. About one-third of the candy the company makes is sold under private labels. The Christmas season accounts for about 35 percent of annual sales.

== Company ownership ==
- 1st generation: Albert Abdallah and Helen (Trovall) Abdallah
- 2nd generation: Abdallah's daughter, Marie (d. 2009 ), and husband, Glenn Oletzke. Oletzke took over the company in 1961.
- 3rd generation: Oletzke's daughter, Vicke Hegedus, and her husband, Stephen. Stephen joined the company in 1963 Stephen ran the company with Vicke's brother James Oletzke until he retired in 1984. Vicke managed the factory retail store until 2010.
- 4th generation: Steven Hegedus joined the company full-time in 1987, and took over as president in 2002. Steve was nominated for the Kettle Award by Candy Industry magazine in 2014.

== Facilities ==
The Calhoun Candy Company was located at Hennepin Avenue and Lake Street in Minneapolis’ Uptown neighborhood. Following bankruptcy and closure during the Depression, Abdallah opened a new Uptown location a few blocks away from the original store in 1937. In 1951, the company moved to a former Minneapolis grocery store on East 38th Street; a fire destroyed that building in 1964. In 1966, the company opened a new 12,000-square-foot (1,100 m^{2}) facility in Burnsville. It was later expanded to 16,000 square feet (1,500 m^{2}). In 1997, the company moved to its second Burnsville location. The original 35,000-square-foot (3,300 m^{2}) facility was expanded to 65,000 square feet (6,000 m^{2}) in 2004. In 2016, the company built a new manufacturing plant 100,000 square feet (9,300 m^{2}) in Apple Valley, MN and operates a retail store there.
