= Mount Pleasant Lutheran Church =

Church in Racine, Wisconsin

Coordinates: 42°42′41.2″N 87°50′59.4″W

Mount Pleasant Lutheran Church (MPLC), also known as Mount Pleasant Church, is an architecturally and historically significant church in Racine, Wisconsin. It was designed by Fort Atkinson, Wisconsin-based architect Helmut Ajango with Gene LaMuro. Nicknamed the Spaceship Church, it is located at 1700 South Green Bay Road and was built in 1975. It is a congregation of the Evangelical Lutheran Church in America.

The church was designed to represent the crown of thorns worn by Jesus Christ during his crucifixion. It includes a dome enclosed in a metal band with outward protruding thorns and a towering metal cross rising skyward. Part of the church was built underground and it has been expanded with an education center, also built underground with skylights. A narthex foyer is part of the complex and the church's entrance includes a stained glass wall by church member and artist Cathy Meader (who designed it in memory of her father Robert Bohm who oversaw construction of the original church building).

Other nicknames for the church include St. Saucer, Spaceship Church, and Pancake Parish, and its circle in the round design centers the sanctuary on the altar and stone baptismal font behind it, "the water and the word". The circle also embodies the unity of the church congregation. The church has a John-Paul Buzard organ.
