= The Garage (Burnsville, Minnesota) =

Music venue in Burnsville, Minnesota

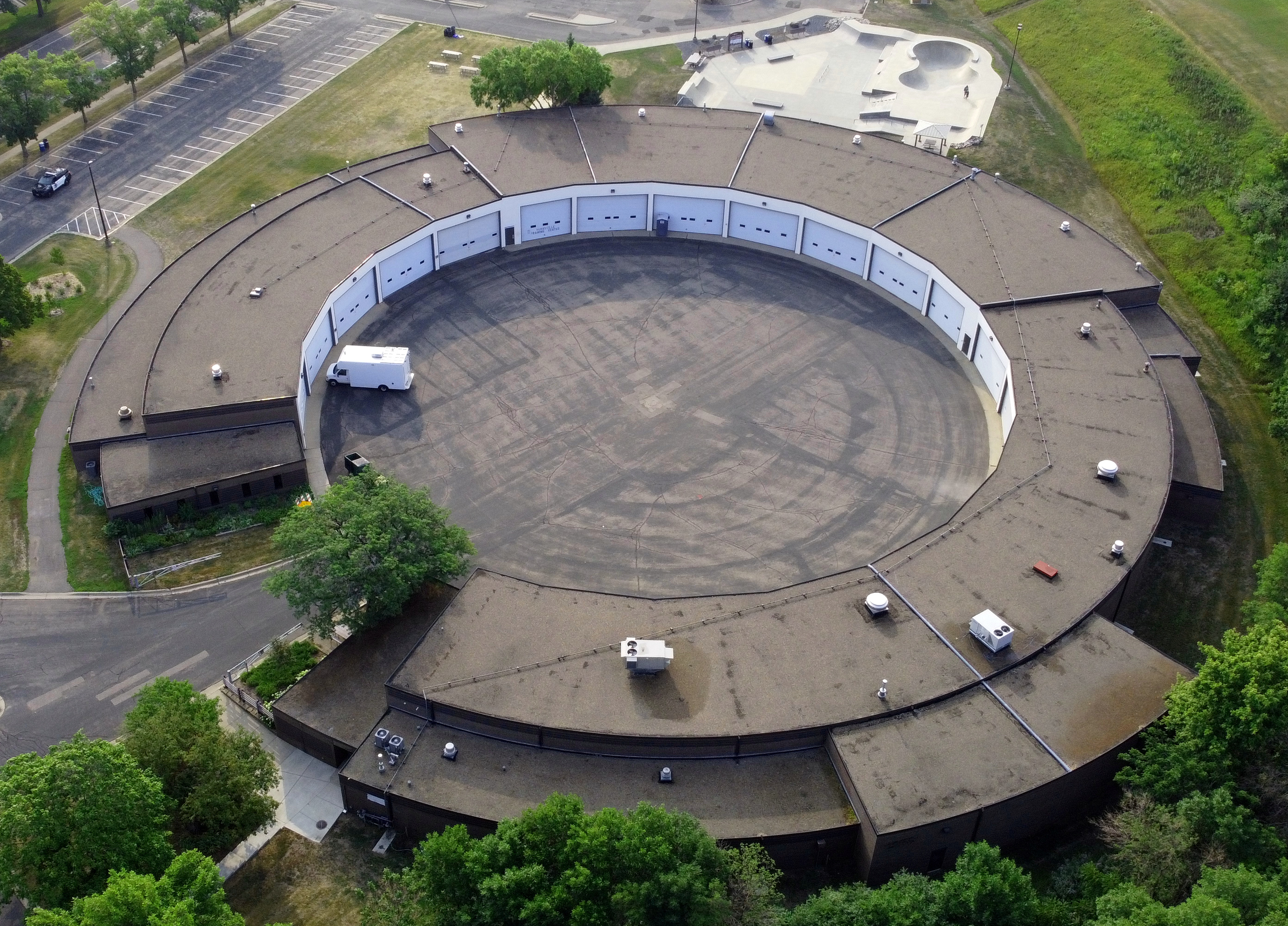
- Interactive map of The Garage
- Address: 75 Civic Center Pkwy; Burnsville, Minnesota; United States
- Coordinates: 44°45′56.5″N 93°16′35.5″W

Construction
- Opened: 17 July 1999

Website
- thegaragemn.com

The Garage is a non-profit all-ages music venue in Burnsville, Minnesota, United States, a southern suburb of Minneapolis. It has been a launching point for local bands such as Down and Above, Dropping Daylight, Escape from Earth, Four Letter Lie, Quietdrive, Screaming Mechanical Brain, and The Autumn Cause.

== History ==
In 1995, the Burnsville city developed the idea to build The Garage as a multi-purpose community center. Although initially voted down, the idea was given momentum when in 1997 grants were obtained to cover the operational costs of a youth center. However, the project lacked the funding necessary to construct or convert a building into a suitable space. In 1998, recommendations for a central youth gathering facility established the Burnsville Youth Center Foundation and through funding from the city and donations from civic organizations and local businesses they were able to establish the youth center now known as The Garage. At the inception of the project the Garage Advisory Board (GAB) was created, which represents and makes decisions on behalf of venue.

The Garage was opened on July 17, 1999 offering after-school and weekend activities for the youth of Burnsville by hosting support groups, learning classes, speakers, awareness benefits, fundraisers, music, concerts and parties. In 2000, the venue's sustained operation went into question, possibly due to low attendances and high expenses. This led to Burnsville students launching the Minnesota Teen Music Association (MTMA), giving teenage musicians responsibility for organizing and implementing The Garage as a night club venue.

At the end of 2001, The Garage faced another potential shut-down as all state grant money was frozen. However, on January 12, 2002, a reprieve was won and funding was restored to the facility. In 2006, a large project was approved, with the donation of three adjoining Burnsville City Council's maintenance garages. This would allow the venue to double in size and add several new areas, including a recording studio and a gym.

== Awards and events ==
The Garage was named "Best All Ages Venue" between 2004 and 2008 by local newspaper City Pages and has also been honored with 2000 Minnesota Recreation and Park Association Award of Excellence and the 2001 Burnsville Community Builder. In 2001 the Minnesota Music Academy announcing it was adding a teen-band category to the ballot and decided to host its Icebreaker show at The Garage. In 2003, a documentary of the center titled Suburban Zeal was produced to draw attention to teenage needs.
