= Helmut Ajango =

Estonian-American architect (1931-2013)

Helmut "Mike" Ajango
- Born: November 30, 1931; Võru, Estonia
- Died: November 15, 2013 (aged 81)
- Education: Wittenberg University (1953); University of Illinois at Urbana–Champaign (1958)
- Occupation: Architect
- Organizations: United Brotherhood of Christ
- Known for: Designing over 175 churches in southern Wisconsin, Fireside Dinner Theatre, The Gobbler
- Spouse: Martha Ajango
- Children: 3
- Awards: Milwaukee Inner City North Avenue Redevelopment Project Architectural Competition (1999)

Helmut "Mike" Ajango (November 30, 1931 – November 15, 2013) was an Estonian-born architect based in Fort Atkinson, Wisconsin in the United States. He designed more than 175 churches in southern Wisconsin as well as Fireside Dinner Theatre (1964) and The Gobbler. His work has been described as combining Mid-Century Modern architecture and Prairie Architecture. Fellow Fort Atkinson architect Gene LaMuro worked with Ajango on some of his projects.

Ajango was born in Võru, Estonia and fled with his family in 1944 to Germany when the Red Army returned to resume the Soviet occupation that had begun in 1939. In 1949, the family immigrated to the United States. Ajango graduated from Wittenberg University (1953) after studying art and mathematics and from University of Illinois at Urbana–Champaign (1958) with an architectural degree. He served in the U.S. Army including as a meteorologist for artillery during the Korean War. When he returned home he became a naturalized U.S. citizen.

He established his architectural firm in Fort Atkinson in 1962. He studied architecture in Europe for six months on a Plym Fellowship from the University of Illinois in 1966.

Ajango won the Milwaukee Inner City North Avenue Redevelopment Project Architectural Competition, in 1999 to redesign the buildings on one side of a city block. He bought the Faith Community Church building on Main Street and converted it into apartments. He and his wife Martha had three children. He was a member of the United Brotherhood of Christ congregation in Fort Atkinson. He was a Green Bay Packers fan.

== Works ==
- Fireside Dinner Theatre, Fort Atkinson, WI (1964)
- Dekorra Lutheran Church in Dekorra, Wisconsin (1971)
- Gobbler Supper Club and Motel in Johnson Creek, Wisconsin
- Monument to those murdered by the occupying Russian Army in 1942 in Tartu, Estonia dedicated in 2001 (after a construction delay)
- Mount Pleasant Church in Racine, Wisconsin
- Evansville High School (Wisconsin)
- Water Tower Place office building on Madison, Wisconsin's Monona Drive
- Manchester Building on the square in Madison
- Hoard Historical Museum expansion and renovation
- Mack building and Wilson building renovation
- Fort Atkinson Municipal Building in downtown Fort Atkinson
- First Federal Building redesign into Fort Atkinson Area Chamber of Commerce office
- Bank of Fort Atkinson expansion and renovation (first), now Johnson Bank
- Black Hawk Hotel conversion for senior housing
- Nasco additions
- Shalom Presbyterian Church redesign and renovation (became Grace United Church, Ajango's congregation)
- Wading pool shade cover at the original Fort Atkinson municipal pool
- Assisted with the dome park shelter at Rock River Park
- Helped develop the chamber of commerce's Fort Atkinson: City of Progress brochure
- Designed staging and sets for the Fort Atkinson Community Theatre
- Wrote and distributed a civil defense survey
- Designed the Fort Atkinson bypass
- Designed signs for chamber of commerce and municipal building
- Restrooms in Ralph Park
- Community-built house for a former chamber tourism director.

== See also ==
- Googie Architecture
- Estonia in World War II
