= Crystal Lake (Dakota, Minnesota) =

Lake in the state of Minnesota, United States

- Location within Minnesota
- Location: Burnsville / Lakeville, Dakota County, Minnesota
- Coordinates: 44°43′21.55″N 93°16′0.24″W
- Basin countries: United States
- Surface area: 280 acres (110 ha)
- Max. depth: 37 ft (11 m)
- Surface elevation: 932 ft (284 m)
- Islands: 1
- Settlements: Burnsville, Minnesota

Crystal Lake is a lake in Burnsville, Dakota County, Minnesota. The lake is a primary source of recreation for the city of Burnsville and the surrounding area. Crystal Beach Park , Crystal Lake West Park and Tyacke Park all have coastline along the lake and offer amenities such as boat landings, picnic areas, hard surfaced courts, playground equipment, walking trails, and others. Nearby Lac Lavon Lake Park has a softball complex, tennis courts, and horseshoe courts. The Lake also contains two islands, Pik-Nik Island (nicknamed Potty Island) and Maple Island. The most southerly parts of the lake extend into the city of Lakeville.

Crystal Lake was named from its sparkling waters.

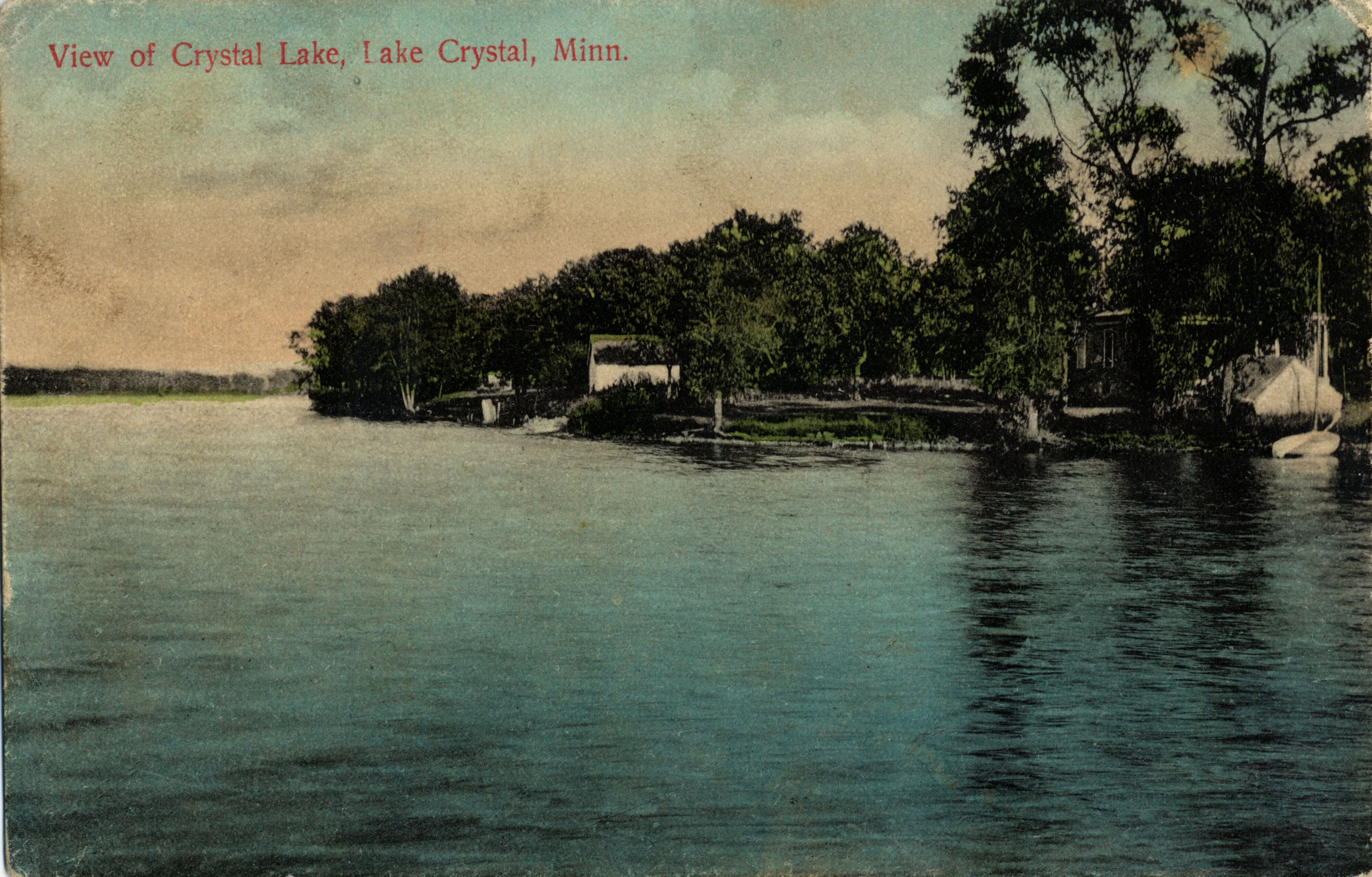
Postcard image of Crystal Lake.

== Wildlife ==
According to the Minnesota DNR, abundant wildlife can get in the way of fishing. The lake has been found to contain the invasive Eurasian Watermilfoil plant species.

Despite the plant life, Bass and Sunfish are common throughout the lake. The DNR has plans to restock the lake with hybrid Muskies in even numbered years, but in the past few of legal size have been caught. Bluegills are also quite common.
