= Brace Yourself (album) =

Studio album by Dropping Daylight
- Released: April 11, 2006
- Genre: Alternative rock Post-grunge
- Length: 35:26
- Label: Octone Records
- Producer: David Bendeth

Dropping Daylight chronology
Take A Photograph EP (2005)	Brace Yourself (2006)	Flashing Lights and Sound (2010)

Professional ratings
Review scores
Source	Rating
Absolutepunk.net	(80%) link

Brace Yourself is the debut album from Dropping Daylight, released on June 13, 2006, on Octone Records.

== Tracks ==
All tracks are written by Sebastian Davin and Dropping Daylight.

1. "Tell Me" (3:22)
2. "Brace Yourself" (3:34)
3. "Waiting Through The Afternoon" (3:06)
4. "Apologies" (3:39)
5. "Take A Photograph" (3:20)
6. "Lucy" (3:00)
7. "Soliloquy" (3:00)
8. "War Song" (3:14)
9. "Blame Me" (2:21)
10. "Answering Our Prayers" (3:39)
11. "Till You Feel Something" (3:11)

== Personnel ==
Dropping Daylight

- Sebastian Davin – vocals, piano, keyboards
- Seth Davin – guitars, backing vocals
- Rob Burke – bass
- Allen Maier – drums (tracks 1–4, 6–11)

Additional personnel

- David Bendeth – producer and mixing (tracks 1–4, 6–11), arrangements (track 5)
- Dropping Daylight – engineering and arrangements (track 5)
- Jake Englund – drums (track 5)
- Leon Zervos – mastering
- John Bender – recording engineer, digital editing
- Wayne Davis – digital editing
- Dan Korneff – digital editing
- Ted Young – digital editing
- Kris Lewis – digital editing
- Isaiah Abolin – digital editing
- Ian Allison – additional loop production
- David Young – additional loop production

== Singles ==
1. "Tell Me" 30 Hot Mainstream Rock Tracks
2. "Blame Me"
3. "Till You Feel Something"
4. "Apologies"
