= The Gobbler =

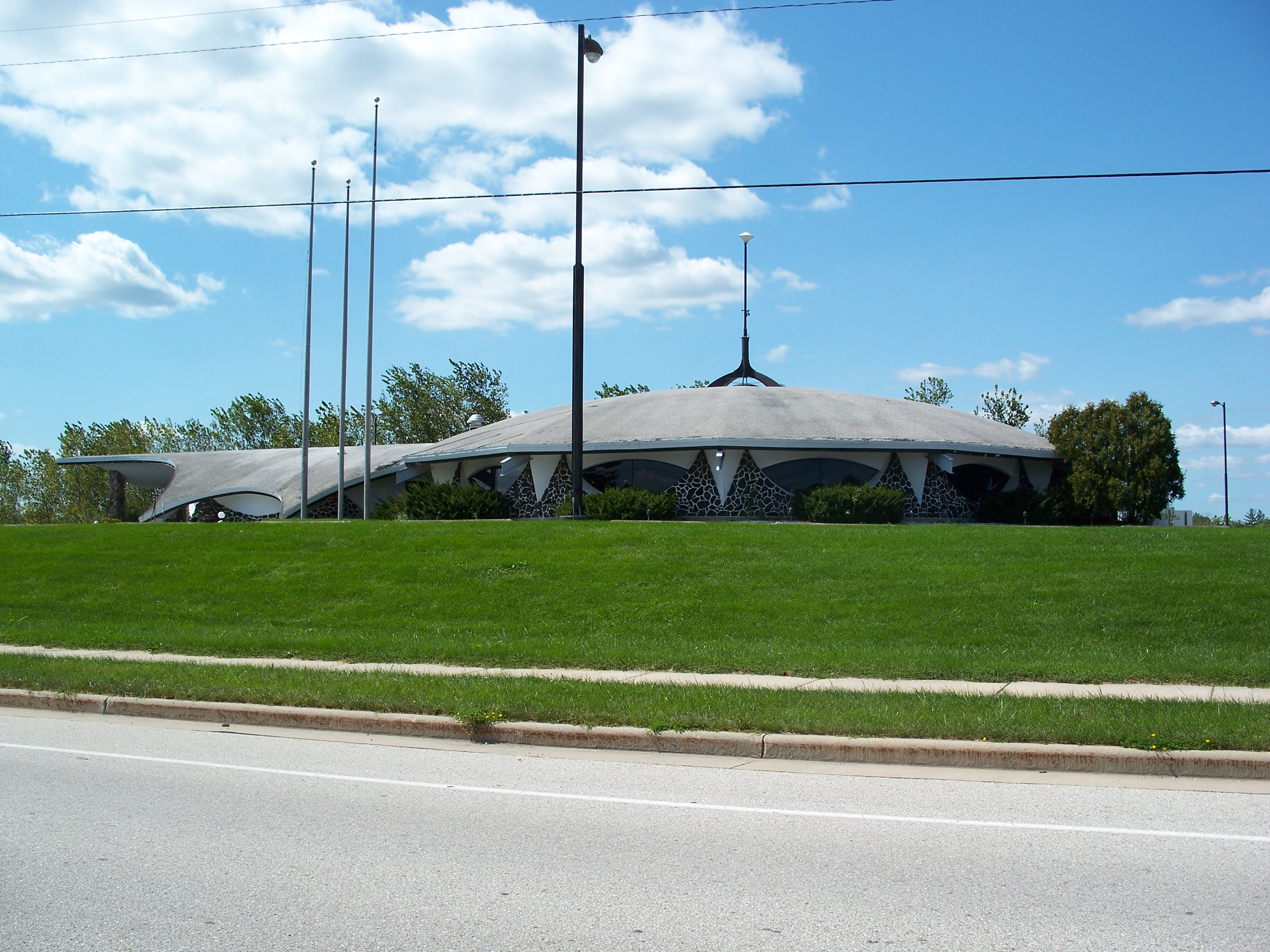
- Former Gobbler Supper Club building in August 2010
- Interactive map of the The Gobbler area

General information
- Location: Johnson Creek, Wisconsin
- Coordinates: 43.0844°N 88.7702°W

Design and construction
- Architect: Helmut Ajango

The Gobbler is a motel, supper club, and roadside attraction in Johnson Creek, Wisconsin, United States. It was designed in the late 1960s by Fort Atkinson architect Helmut Ajango for local poultry processor Clarence Hartwig and opened in 1967. The menu featured turkey, prime rib and steak. It included a rotating circular bar that completed one revolution every 80 minutes. The Gobbler is at the intersection of Wisconsin Highway 26 and I-94, halfway between Milwaukee and Madison, Wisconsin. It closed in 1992. The original restaurant building reopened as the Gobbler Theater in late 2015.

== History ==
Hartwig's poultry plant was located just south of the supper club and closed in 1971 after Hartwig announced that it was too costly to upgrade the plant to meet new USDA standards. At the time, the plant was the largest employer in Johnson Creek, employing up to 300 workers and processing 30 million pounds of poultry a year. Hartwig's other ventures, the Gobbler supper club, the Cackle Shack restaurant and Gobbler motel remained open.

In 1974, the Wisconsin Equal Rights Division ruled that the restaurant violated the rights of two women by firing them for refusing to wear uniforms that were different from the uniform of male employees. Male waiters and bartenders wore tuxedos, while female waitresses were required to wear "black briefs, fishnet stockings and V-necked hunting jackets." It was the first ruling to find "sex discrimination on the basis of uniforms".

In late May 1992, then-motel and restaurant manager Clyde Hartwig filed a notice with the Village of Johnson Creek stating that the motel and restaurant would "permanently cease operations and close its business" by July 26 of that year. A newspaper article about the closure noted that, when the announcement was made, the operation was struggling, and that a visit showed only "7 tables of about 40 tables" were occupied during the dinner rush, and that "Five vehicles were parked at the motel at the same time". The restaurant closed as scheduled, although a newspaper article published in 1995 claims the motel had stayed open until early that year.

=== Post-closure ===
After the Hartwig family sold the building in the early 1990s, several restaurants operated in the building. The first was a Mexican restaurant called "Redondos" in 1995. Others included a roadside diner, "The Round Stone Restaurant", and "The New Gobbler". The last tenant went out of business in mid-2002.

There were attempts by the Menominee, Potawatomi and Lac du Flambeau Chippewa tribes in the 1990s to purchase the land for a multimillion-dollar casino, hotel and convention center. The land was still for sale in 2007, the motel property for $6.2 million and the restaurant property for $2.3 million.

In June 2008, the Frank Lloyd Wright Wisconsin Tourism Program hosted "The Gobbler Gala" at the restaurant. The dinner featured talks by Gobbler architect Ajango and Wright historian Sidney Robinson.

The owners held an auction of the property and separate items, including the petrified wood that lined the entrance, in December 2009, hoping to recoup some of their costs.

In 2011, the locally produced film Missed Connections was shot on location at the restaurant.

=== Re-opening, Temporary Closure and Second Re-opening ===
The Gobbler was reopened in December 2015 as the Gobbler Theater by owner Dan Manesis, who bought the property in 2014. The iconic rotating bar remained, as well as the original chairs and some of the decor. The theater temporarily closed in 2021 and reopened on June 6, 2026 with a sold-out show.

== Motel ==
Logo used in 1972 for newspaper advertising

Across the street from the supper club, the Gobbler Motel had an adventurous, futuristic Googie architecture design that featured 49 rooms with symbol-shaped waterbeds (such as a heart-shape), 8-track players, round sunken bathtubs, and differently colored shag carpet that extended up the walls in each themed room. According to a 1978 newspaper article, it required two maids to make the motel's round waterbeds, with the maids "hanging by one arm and stretching out a stockinged foot to smooth away wrinkles"

After multiple changes in ownership (including a renaming to the "King Arthur's Inn Motel" in April 1995) and years of unrepaired wear, the motel was abandoned in 2001. Shortly thereafter, the Johnson Creek Fire Department burned the motel to the ground as a "practice fire" for their firefighters. The concrete slab on which the motel was built was left in place until 2019. The motel site has been redeveloped and is now home to an assisted living and memory care community.

== See also ==
- List of motels
- List of supper clubs
