= Ames Center =

Performing arts venue in Burnsville, Minnesota

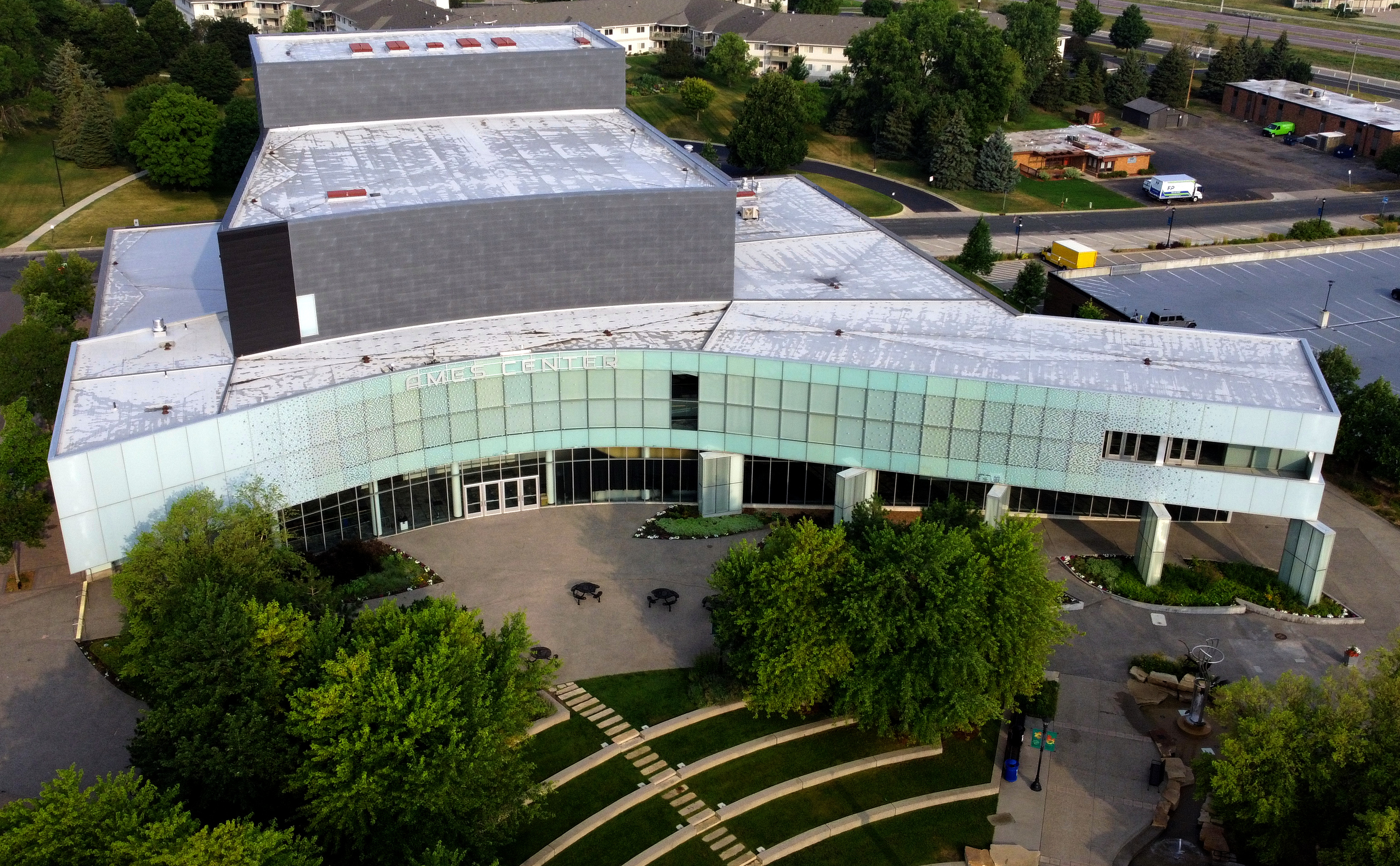
- Interactive map of Ames Center
- Former names: Burnsville Performing Arts Center
- Address: 12600 Nicollet Ave; Burnsville, Minnesota
- Coordinates: 44.7741°N 93.2795°W
- Operator: VenuWorks

Construction
- Opened: January 2009

The Ames Center, formerly the Burnsville Performing Arts Center, is a performing arts venue in Burnsville, Minnesota, adjacent to Nicollet Commons Park, which features green space, water fountains, and a 250-seat outdoor performance amphitheater. The Ames Center features an eclectic range of performances on the main stage and the black box theatres including: dance, theatre, concerts, comedians, and written word. Past performances include the Girl Singers of the Hit Parade, Larry Carlton, Louie Anderson, Lori Lane, Richard Marx, Church Basement Ladies, Melissa Manchester, Bill Engvall, Nick Colionne, Celtic Crossroads, Twin Cities Ballet of Minnesota, Elizabeth Gilbert, Rob Lake, Tommy Emmanuel, Sinbad, Ralphie May, Dakota Valley Symphony, Chameleon Theater Circle, Miss Minnesota USA/Teen USA, and Cirque D’Or. Additionally, productions of Mame, A Christmas Carol and Peter Pan were presented utilizing sets created for the Kennedy Center, the Kodak Theatre and the original Cathy Rigby Broadway production respectively.

== History ==
Plans to build the arts center in Burnsville originated with Partners for Tomorrow, a citizen-based community forum convened in 1993 and 1994. Talks continued for more than ten years. A building contract was finally drawn in September 2007 between the city and Lund Martin Construction Inc. The space was designed by Ankeny Kell Architects of St. Paul. Burnsville Mayor Elizabeth Kautz and Burnsville City Council members led the ribbon cutting ceremony on January 21, 2009, which was followed by performances from Burnsville artists, musicians, dancers, and actors. Grammy award-winning artist Melissa Manchester headlined the inaugural gala on January 31, 2009.

== Facilities ==
=== Main Stage ===
The Main Stage is the largest of the theatres in the complex with a capacity of 1014 seats. (759 Orchestra and 255 Balcony). The theatre is outfitted with state-of-the-art sound and lighting systems. The theatre is accessible on the ground and second level atrium lobbies and via elevator. The stage is 45 ft (14 m) deep by 100 ft (30 m) wide, with a 48 ft (15 m) proscenium opening. There is room for a total of 30 wheelchairs and 31 companion seats.

Fly House is 65' clear from floor to the loading gallery with 62 line sets capable of lifting 2000 lbs each. A concealed orchestra pit is located at the front of stage.

=== Black Box Theatre ===
The Black Box Theatre is a completely open space, making it flexible to a variety of performance setups. The room can be hung with sound and lighting instruments and is curtained. Risers are available to set the room to a capacity of 150 seated patrons. The handicap accessible seats are located in the first row of seating and will be accommodated as needs dictate.

=== Art Gallery ===
The Burnsville PAC currently holds eight gallery exhibits every calendar year in its 2,000-square-foot (190 m^{2}) art gallery, which is free and open to the public. The mission is to celebrate the visual arts by displaying a diverse collection of artwork from local emerging and professional artists.

=== The Rehearsal Room ===
The Rehearsal Room is an 1,800 sq ft (170 m^{2}) space complete with mirrors and ballet barres on the walls and a sprung maple floor for dance rehearsal purposes. The room can accommodate up to 100 people.

=== Meeting Rooms ===
Meeting rooms can be split in half with an air wall to separate groups or completely opened to accommodate 100 guests in a theatre style setup. Classroom setups as well as any combination of hollow square table design can be accommodated in this space.

=== Green Rooms ===
A green room is located next to the Star Dressing room in the backstage area and can be utilized for smaller get-togethers of 30-50 persons in a secluded environment. This room features an adjacent entrance area and is carpeted and well lighted. All dressing rooms are accessible therefore there are no specifically designed handicapped dressing room facilities.

=== VIP Suite ===
The VIP Suite is located on the north end of the second floor atrium next to the open air balcony and provides for a private VIP setting for board meetings, intimate formal dining, meet n’ greets, etc.

=== Upper Lobby ===
The upper lobby, approximately 4,000 sq ft (370 m^{2}), can seat up to 250 patrons for banquets, wedding receptions, trade shows booths and other special events. Windows are floor to ceiling offering views of Nicollet Commons Park and the Minnesota River and the Minneapolis skyline to the north.

== Community Connections ==
=== Dakota Valley Symphony (DVS) ===
The Ames Center's main stage is home to the Dakota Valley Symphony, a non-profit, volunteer community arts organization. The symphony is composed of a 60-member symphony orchestra, a 40-member mixed chorus and a 90-member Summer Pops orchestra and chorus, all under the direction of founder and music director Stephen J. Ramsey.

=== International Festival of Burnsville ===
The International Festival of Burnsville is a summer day-long event designed to promote and celebrate Burnsville's cultural diversity through the sharing of art, food, dance, and music of various cultures. Some of the art work for the festival is showcased in the Ames Center's Art Gallery.

=== Twin Cities Ballet of Minnesota (TCB) ===
Twin Cities Ballet of Minnesota is an independent, 501(c)(3) non-profit semi-professional dance company that draws its dancers from area professional dance companies, dance schools, and community residents. TCB's rehearsal and administrative home is at the premier new facility of Ballet Royale Minnesota, the first and only dedicated classical ballet academy south of the Minnesota River, located on the border of Lakeville and Burnsville, in the heart of the Minneapolis/St. Paul south metro area. Performances are held at the state-of-the-art professional theater at Ames Center.
