= Dropping Daylight =

American rock band

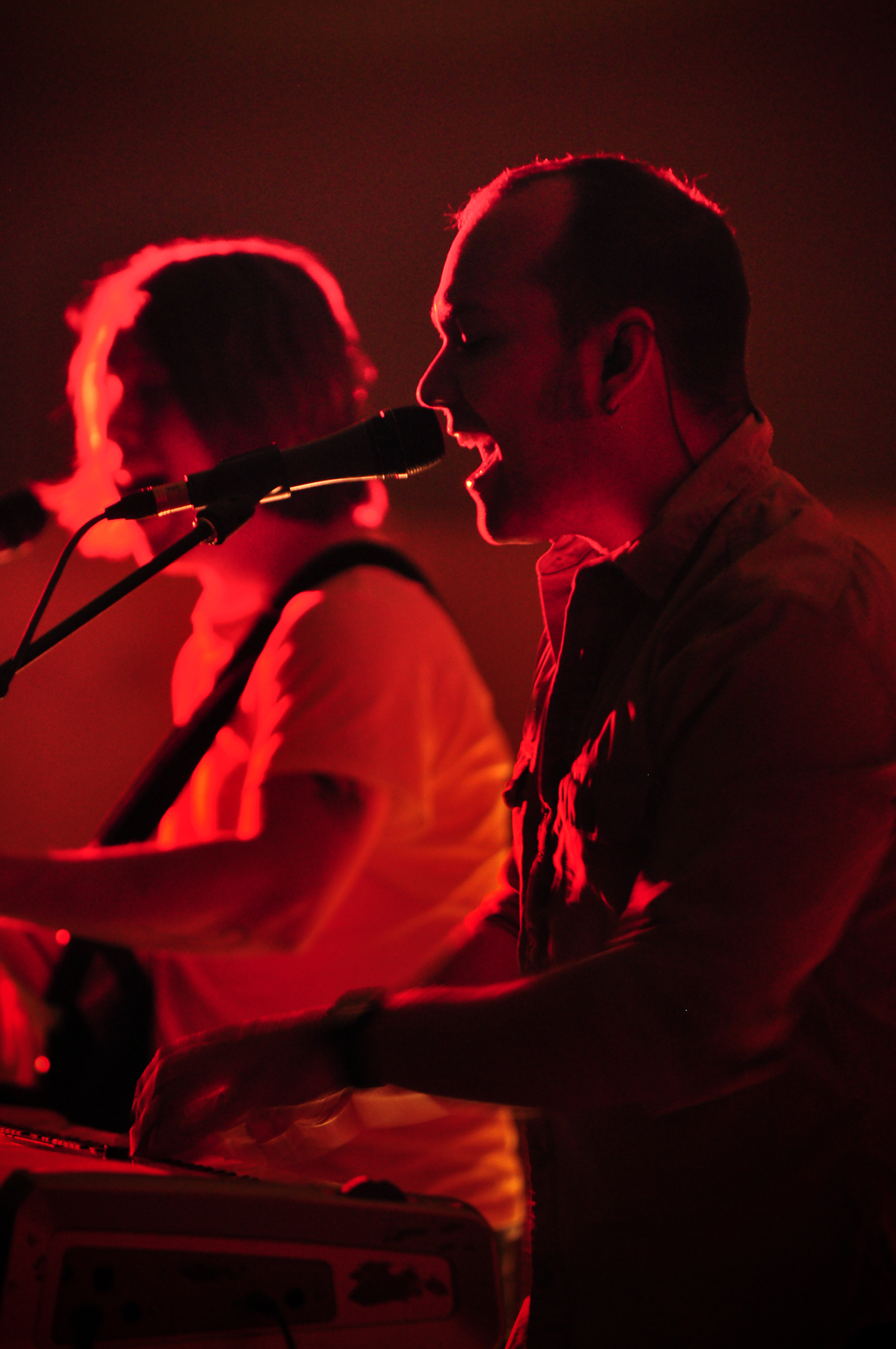
- Sebastian and Seth Davin in 2010

Background information
- Also known as: Kidnap Kings
- Origin: Minneapolis, Minnesota, United States
- Genres: Alternative rock
- Years active: 2001–present
- Labels: A&M Octone
- Members: Sebastian Davin; Seth Davin; Rob Burke; Allen Maier
- Past members: Jacob "Jake" Englund

Dropping Daylight is an American rock band from Minneapolis, Minnesota. They have performed with Jason Mraz, The Pixies, Plain White T's, Jonas Brothers, Paramore, Papa Roach, Cypress Hill, Green Day, Phantom Planet, The Misfits, Blue October, Breaking Benjamin, and more recently with Army of Anyone and Sick Puppies.

== History ==
=== Early years ===
Dropping Daylight began when the original members (Sebastian Davin, Rob Burke and Jacob "Jake" Englund) were in junior high under the name "Associated Mess". Jake had the vision and worked with local officials in their hometown to start a youth center featuring live music—giving roots to The Garage. Associated Mess performed there with Aaron Burke on drums and Jake on guitar. Jake switched to drums when Aaron left to attend university. Sebastian, Rob and Jake gigged around Minneapolis during high school.

=== Sui Generis ===
In 2001, Sebastian and Jake attended the Berklee College of Music Sebastian and Jake worked on many recordings with other students but Sebastian's original singer songwriter music, Englund's drumming and management and vision and Tim Paul Winer—a friend, student and studio musician, worked on a handful of original songs together. Liking the sound of it they called former Associated Mess member, bassist, Rob Burke who was looking through a dictionary and found the band name "Sui Generis." Sebastian and Jake left Berklee, with a 10-song original record in production, and began playing regional rock shows with Sebastian on Piano and Vocals, Rob on Bass, and Jake on drums and managing the group. The group needed a guitar player and recruited Sebastian's then 14-year old brother, Seth, to round out the band.

=== Sue Generis ===
Between 2002 and 2003, the group played rock shows with beloved bands Quietdrive, Down and Above, and Papa Roach among the 40 to 50 shows per year around the Midwest. Promoter Rich Best of Live Nation combined with Producer Chris Grainger, and Jon Delange played key roles in getting the self titled Sui Generis Record into the hands of Music Business Attorney Charles J. Biederman and Vice President of A&R for Epic Records and Sony Music, Pete Giberga. The band realized that a prior Sui Generis from Argentina, would create confusion and copyright issues and changed the band name to "Sue Generis" and released another independent record entitled "Back to Nowhere". Then, Jeff and Chris helped get the band last minute date at the 2004, SXSW at the Blind Pig on 6th Street Hundreds of Music Business Professionals attended the show that night which started a buzz of activity around the band which led to courting from Record Labels, Management Teams, Booking Agencies, and many performances. The group built a team with Bill Silva and Creative Artist Agency leading the vision laid by the group in early years.

=== Dropping Daylight ===
The band name was again changed to Dropping Daylight when they were signed by Octone Records and RCA Music in 2004.

The band toured on the Vans Warped Tour for a number of years, but more recently have toured with such acts as Breaking Benjamin, Blue October, Monty Are I, Meg & Dia and Jason Mraz. They have been featured on MTV News: You Hear it First. Their track "Tell Me" off their first full-length album, Brace Yourself, has been receiving regular radio-play from a number of stations as well as peaking at 30 on Hot Mainstream Rock Tracks.

They tour regularly with Breaking Benjamin, and Sebastian contributed vocals and piano to Breaking Benjamin's Phobia album.

Sebastian contributed piano to Paramore's Riot album.

Brace Yourself is the band's first nationally released album. However it could be considered their third album. Previously demos and releases under various band names were self-titled "Associated Mess", self-titled "Sue Generis", and "Back to Nowhere." Singles and EPs include "Take a Photograph" and "Have Yourself a Merry Little Christmas." Many songs are reinterpretations of earlier songs all the way back to their original demo. The band has also spread the word of a possible live release from their concert at Wilkes-Barre's Wachovia Arena and Kingston's Joe Nardone's Gallery of Sound.

=== Kidnap Kings ===
The band changed their name to Kidnap Kings, and released an album under their new name: Flashing Lights and Sound.

== Members ==
- Sebastian Davin – lead vocals, piano, rhythm guitar
- Seth Davin – lead guitar, backing vocals
- Rob Burke – bass guitar
- Allen Maier – drums (2006–present)
- Jacob "Jake" Englund – drums (2001 - 2006)

== Discography ==
As Sui Generis

- Self Titled (2002)

As Sue Generis

- Back to Nowhere (2003)

As Dropping Daylight

- Take a Photograph EP (2005)
- Brace Yourself (2006)

As Kidnap Kings

- Flashing Lights and Sound (2010)
