= Concrete Injection =

American rock band

- Origin: Minneapolis, Minnesota, U.S.
- Genres: Rock
- Years active: 2012–present
- Label: Independent
- Members: Sota James; Dylan Cash; Baylen Pocket; Cutty
- Website: Concrete Injection

Concrete Injection (sometimes stylized as CI) is an American Rock band from Minneapolis, formed in 2012. The band consists of Sota James (vocals), Dylan Cash (guitar), Baylen Pocket (bass), and Cutty (drums). Their first radio single titled "Devil's Crypt" from their debut album, "Die Anyways" stayed in rotation on the Music World Radio active charts for 8 weeks in 2014, peaking at #12. Their second single, titled "Vulnerable Skin" remained on the Music World Radio charts for 27 weeks, peaking at #4. They achieved the #1 band ranking on the Reverbnation metal/rock charts in the Midwest twice in 2014, 4 times in 2015, 5 times in 2016, 3 times in 2017 and twice in 2018. They were also featured artist on V6 Radio and were in the weekly top ten charts of Highway Rock Radio 365 charts, reaching #7 in May, 2017 with "Stained Teeth" and reached #1 in January, 2018 with "Run for Cover" off their 2nd album titled "Aluminum Sky". They have been featured artists on Minneapolis / St. Paul KXXR FM 93.7 radio (93x) "Loud and Local" numerous times during 2015 through 2018.

The band released their third full-album titled "Cursed Bloodline" on August 12, 2018, via all major online retailers. Final mixing & mastering was completed at world famous Winterland Studios in Minneapolis, Minnesota. The album contains 8 songs. The first release titled "Mind Games" has been in heavy circulation worldwide on hundreds of Internet radio sites and featured locally on 93.7 FM (KXXR - Minneapolis) during summer and fall of 2018.

== Discography ==
=== Studio albums ===
Year	Album	Chart positions			
Year	Album	Billboard 200	UK Rock Chart	ReverbNation	Highway Rock Radio Top 10
2014	Die Anyways: Released July 23, 2014; Label: Sunlight Basin	-	#4	#1	#7
2016	Aluminum Sky: Released April 2, 2016; Label: Oak Creek Studios	-	#9	#1	#1
2018	Cursed Bloodline: Released August 12, 2018; Label: Oak Creek Studios		#1	#1	
