= 2026 in heavy metal music =

This is a timeline documenting the events of heavy metal in the year 2026.

== Bands disbanded ==
- The Crown
- Exciter
- Ghost (hiatus)
- Heavy Heavy Low Low
- Reflections
- Sepultura
- Svalbard
- Venom

== Bands formed ==
- Blue Medusa
- Lex Legion

== Bands reformed ==
- Black Tide
- Blind Channel
- Burnt by the Sun
- Edguy
- Faith No More
- Forced Entry
- Living Death
- Mortification
- Mucky Pup
- Murderdolls
- Norther
- Slaughter

== Events ==
- On February 9, former Manowar guitarist Ross the Boss announced that he was diagnosed with ALS; he died of the disease less than two months later.
- On February 26 and 27, Children of Bodom played their first shows in seven years at the Tavastia Club in Helsinki, titled "A Celebration of Music". Both shows were held as a tribute to their original vocalist and guitarist Alexi Laiho, who died in 2020, with Samy Elbanna of Lost Society filling in for him.
- On April 10, Triumph began their first major tour in 38 years at the Hard Rock Live in Orlando, Florida. Originally planned to feature all three original members (Rik Emmett, Mike Levine and Gil Moore), Levine was absent from the tour due to health issues.
- On April 13, Iron Maiden were announced among the 2026 inductees into the Rock and Roll Hall of Fame.
- On April 23, Megadeth performed the first show of what has been announced as the band's farewell tour in Lima, Peru, which is projected to span approximately three to five years.
- On May 1, Solitude Aeturnus announced that they have parted ways with longtime vocalist Robert Lowe, who fronted the band from 1988 to 2011 and again from 2023 to 2026.
- On June 7, Rush played their first show in eleven years as part of their "Fifty Something" reunion tour at the Kia Forum, with drummer Anika Nilles filling in for Neil Peart, who died from brain cancer in 2020.
- On July 24, King Diamond announced they had parted ways with original and longtime guitarist Andy LaRocque, and revealed Gus G of Firewind and formerly of Ozzy Osbourne's solo band as his replacement.
- On August 12, original Deep Purple guitarist Ritchie Blackmore performed with the band for the first time in 33 years at the Jones Beach Theater in Wantagh, New York, joining them for "Smoke on the Water" during the encore.
- On October 9, Judas Priest announced that longtime bassist Ian Hill (who had been in the band since 1970) had retired from the band due to ongoing arthritis in his shoulders, knees and right hand, and revealed Uriah Heep bassist Dave Rimmer as his replacement.
- On October 15, Nightwish announced they had parted ways with lead vocalist Floor Jansen.
- On October 19, Diana Leah announced her departure from Delain after only one album. The band then revealed that instead of searching for a new permanent lead vocalist, they would collaborate with different vocalists for future releases and shows.
- On November 7, Sepultura played their final show at the Suhai Music Hall in São Paulo, concluding their year-long "Celebrating Life Through Death" farewell tour.
- Twisted Sister had previously announced their first major tour in a decade to mark the band's 50th anniversary, titled "Twisted Forever, Forever Twisted", to begin this year. However, lead singer Dee Snider retired from the band in February after a series of health issues, leading to the tour's cancellation and the band's future unknown. On March 3, it was announced the band would play select shows later in the year with Sebastian Bach (formerly of Skid Row) as the vocalist.

== Deaths ==
- January 5 – Michael "M-Bro" Embro, former drummer of Razor, died from undisclosed reasons at the age of 63.
- January 22 – Francis Buchholz, former bassist of Scorpions and Michael Schenker's Temple of Rock, died from cancer at the age of 71.
- January 31 – Jimmy Iversen, former guitarist of Jorn, died from undisclosed reasons at the age of 66.
- February 8 – Andrzej "Quack" Kułakowski, former guitarist of Hate, died from undisclosed reasons at the age of 54.
- February 9 – Ernesto Colon, former guitarist of Merauder, died from undisclosed reasons.
- February 15 – Mark Sawickis, former guitarist of Impetigo, died from undisclosed reasons at the age of 58.
- March 13 – Phil Campbell, guitarist of Phil Campbell and the Bastard Sons and former guitarist of Motörhead, died from complications from surgery at the age of 64.
- March 26 – Ross the Boss, former guitarist of Manowar, died from ALS at the age of 72.
- April 2 – Bo Lueders, guitarist of Harm's Way, died from suicide at the age of 38.
- May 8 – Bartholomäus "Barth" Resch, former bassist of Belphegor and Our Survival Depends on Us, died in a car accident.
- May 11 – Jack Douglas, producer and mixer of numerous bands including Aerosmith, Alice Cooper, Blue Öyster Cult, Montrose, Rough Cutt and Zebra, died from undisclosed reasons at the age of 80.
- May 21 – Federico Benini, bassist of Akercocke, died from drowning at the age of 37.
- June 2 – Rick Johnson, former drummer of Grief, died from undisclosed reasons at the age of 55.
- June 28 – David Black, guitarist of Seduce and former guitarist of Crud, died from cancer.
- July 1 – Shaun Glass, former guitarist of Soil and Dirge Within, and former bassist of Broken Hope, died of complications from a stroke at the age of 57.
- July 4 – Roger "B. War" Svensson, former bassist of Marduk and Devils Whorehouse, died from undisclosed reasons at the age of 60.
- July 6 – Kevin Chown, bassist who performed with numerous bands and artists, including Tarja, Steelheart, and Artension, died from cancer at the age of 56.
- July 13 – Mike Browning, drummer of Nocturnus AD, former drummer and vocalist of Morbid Angel, and former drummer of Acheron, died from undisclosed reasons at the age of 62.
- July 18 – Jennifer Finch, bassist and vocalist of L7, died from brain cancer at the age of 59.
- July 26 – Ken Elkinton, former vocalist of Defiance, died from complications of pneumonia, sepsis and heart issues at the age of 66.
- July 30 – Danny Lomeli, drummer and former guitarist of Elysia, died from undisclosed reasons.
- July 31 – John Brenner, vocalist and guitarist of Revelation, died from stomach cancer at the age of 59.
- August 8 – Mike Milford, vocalist of Scars of Tomorrow, died from cancer.
- September 5 – Andy Williams, guitarist for Every Time I Die, died after collapsing during a professional wrestling match at the age of 48.
- September 9 – Mikko Karmila, producer and engineer of numerous bands including Nightwish, Children of Bodom, Stratovarius, Amorphis, and Sonata Arctica, died from undisclosed reasons at the age of 62.
- September 15 – Marcus Andersson, drummer of Disfear, died from glioblastoma.
- September 20 – Chad Gilbert, former bassist of Morning Again and former lead vocalist of Shai Hulud, died from adrenocortical carcinoma at the age of 45.
- September 25 – Chuck Varga, former occasional vocalist and backing vocalist of Gwar, died from cancer.
- October 1 – Conrad "Cronos" Lant, vocalist and bassist of Venom, died from undisclosed reasons at the age of 63.
- October 24 – Nigel Durham, former drummer of Saxon, died from undisclosed reasons at the age of 61.
- November 11 – Tony Richards, former drummer of W.A.S.P. and Dante Fox, died from undisclosed reasons at the age of 69.
- November 15 – John Christ, former guitarist of Danzig, died from undisclosed reasons at the age of 61.

== Albums expected ==
=== January ===
Day	Artist	Album
2	Paleface Swiss	The Wilted EP (EP)
7	Nanowar of Steel	The Genghis Khan EP to End All Genghis Khan EPs (EP)
9	Alter Bridge	Alter Bridge
9	Beyond the Black	Break the Silence
9	Bullet	Kickstarter
9	For My Pain...	Buried Blue
9	The Ruins of Beverast	Tempelschlaf
9	Uuhai	Human Herds
16	Edenbridge	Set the Dark on Fire
16	The Eternal	Celestial (EP)
16	Holy Dragons	Guardians of Time – Part I
16	Kreator	Krushers of the World
16	My Ruin	Declaration of Resistance
16	Ov Sulfur	Endless
16	Soen	Reliance
23	Coronatus	Dreadful Waters
23	Crystal Lake	The Weight of Sound
23	Helix	Scrap Metal
23	Megadeth	Megadeth
23	Melissa Bonny	Cherry Red Apocalypse
23	Pelican	Ascending (EP)
23	Poppy	Empty Hands
23	Textures	Genotype
28	Hanabie.	Hot Topic (EP)
30	Hällas	Panorama
30	Møl	Dreamcrush
30	Our Mirage	Fractured Minds
30	Therion	Con Orquesta (live album)

=== February ===
Day	Artist	Album
3	Stephen Brodsky	Cut to the Core Vol. 2 (covers album)
5	Paganizer	As Mankind Rots
6	Demonic Resurrection	Apocalyptic Dawn (EP)
6	Karnivool	In Verses
6	KMFDM	Enemy
6	Mayhem	Liturgy of Death
6	Tailgunner	Midnight Blitz
6	Wolverine	Anomalies
13	Converge	Love Is Not Enough
13	Powerwolf	Wildlive (Live at Olympiahalle) (live album)
13	Saille	Forebode
18	Lovebites	Outstanding Power
20	Clawfinger	Before We All Die
20	Exhumed	Red Asphalt
20	Michael Monroe	Outerstellar
20	Stam1na	Apnea
20	Sylosis	The New Flesh
20	Worm Shepherd	Dawn of the Iconoclast (EP)
27	Cryptic Shift	Overspace & Supertime
27	Rob Zombie	The Great Satan
27	Ruoska	Kade
27	Varials	Where the Light Leaves

=== March ===
Day	Artist	Album
6	Blackbraid	Nocturnal Womb (EP)
6	Bosse-de-Nage	Hidden Fires Burn Hottest
6	Erra	Silence Outlives the Earth
6	Leaves' Eyes	Song of Darkness (EP)
6	Lost Society	Hell Is a State of Mind
6	More	Destructor
6	Prong	Live and Uncleansed (live album)
6	Vreid	The Skies Turn Black
12	Eternal Champion	Friend of War (EP)
13	Angus McSix	Angus McSix and the All-Seeing Astral Eye
13	Lamb of God	Into Oblivion
13	Monstrosity	Screams from Beneath the Surface
13	Nili Brosh	Eventide
13	The Scratch	Pull Like a Dog
13	UnityTX	Somewhere, in Between...
13	Vicious Rain	The Anatomy of Surviving
13	Witchcraft	A Sinner's Child (EP)
20	Attila	Concrete Throne
20	Axel Rudi Pell	Ghost Town
20	Dawn of Ashes	Anatomy of Suffering
20	Exodus	Goliath
20	King 810	Rustbelt Nu Metal 3
20	Lost in Hollywood	Lost in Hollywood
20	Neurosis	An Undying Love for a Burning World
20	Poison the Well	Peace in Place
20	Tyketto	Closer to the Sun
27	Black Label Society	Engines of Demolition
27	Carnivore A.D.	Transmutation (EP)
27	Chamber	This Is Goodbye...
27	Defacing God	Darkness Is My Crown
27	Godsticks	Void
27	Hellripper	Coronach
27	Iron Savior	Awesome Anthems of the Galaxy (covers album)
27	Lion's Share	Inferno
27	Mallavora	What If Better Never Comes?
27	Myrath	Wilderness of Mirrors
27	Ram-Zet	Sapien
27	Threat Signal	Revelations
27	Winterfylleth	The Unyielding Season

=== April ===
Day	Artist	Album
3	Corrosion of Conformity	Good God / Baad Man
3	Green Carnation	A Dark Poem, Pt. II: Sanguis
3	Michael Sweet	The Master Plan
3	Nervosa	Slave Machine
3	Sunn O)))	Sunn O)))
8	Dir En Grey	Mortal Downer
10	Archspire	Too Fast to Die
10	As Everything Unfolds	Did You Ask to Be Set Free?
10	Bodysnatcher	Hell Is Here, Hell Is Home
10	Enter Shikari	Lose Your Self
10	Immolation	Descent
10	Long Distance Calling	The Phantom Void
10	Lord of the Lost	Opvs Noir Vol. 3
10	Melechesh	Sentinels of Shamash (EP)
10	The Melvins and Napalm Death	Savage Imperial Death March (collaborative album)
10	Metal Church	Dead to Rights
10	Spirit Adrift	Infinite Illumination
10	Vomitory	In Death Throes
17	Crimson Glory	Chasing the Hydra
17	From Ashes to New	Reflections
17	The Last Ten Seconds of Life	The Dead Ones
17	Nekrogoblikon	The Boiling Sea (EP)
17	Skindred	You Got This
17	Victorius	World War Dinosaur
17	Wage War	It Calls Me by Name (EP)
18	Corey Taylor, Jim Root, Shawn Crahan and Sid Wilson	Look Outside Your Window
23	Vomit Forth	In the Name of the Father (EP)
24	The Amity Affliction	House of Cards
24	At the Gates	The Ghost of a Future Dead
24	Atreyu	The End Is Not the End
24	Drudkh	Thaw (EP)
24	Elegant Weapons	Evolution
24	Gus G	Steel Burner
24	John Corabi	New Day
24	Plini	An Unnameable Desire
24	Portrayal of Guilt	...Beginning of the End
24	Saratoga	En Estado Puro
24	Sepultura	The Cloud of Unknowing (EP)
24	Six Feet Under	Next to Die

=== May ===
Day	Artist	Album
1	-(16)-	Forgeries (72–84) (covers album)
1	Cognizance	In Light, No Shape
1	Godsmack	Live at Mohegan Sun (live album)
1	Haste the Day	Dissenter
1	Sevendust	One
1	Venom	Into Oblivion
3	Geoff Tate	Operation: Mindcrime III
5	Darko US	Oni 2
8	Black Veil Brides	Vindicate
8	Crashdïet	Art of Chaos
8	Darkthrone	Pre-Historic Metal
8	Draconian	In Somnolent Ruin
8	Frozen Soul	No Place of Warmth
8	Ingested	Denigration
8	Panopticon	Det Hjemsøkte Hjertet
8	The Quill	Master of the Skies
8	Rexoria	Fallen Dimension
15	Acid Reign	Daze of the Week
15	Angellore	Nocturnes
15	Artillery	Made in Hell (EP)
15	Jungle Rot	Cruel Face of War
15	Periphery	A Pale White Dot
15	Primus	A Handful of Nuggs (EP)
15	Pro-Pain	Stone Cold Anger
22	Armored Saint	Emotion Factory Reset
22	Ayreon	30th Anniversary – An Amazing Flight Through Time (live album)
22	Dimmu Borgir	Grand Serpent Rising
22	Elvenking	Rites of Disclosure (EP)
22	Erik Grönwall	Bad Bones
22	Moonlight Haze	Interstellar Madness (EP)
22	Varg	Live at Wolfszeit Festival 2024 (live album)
22	Vision Divine	A Clockwork Reverie (EP)
29	Devin Townsend	The Moth
29	Hecate Enthroned	The Corpse of a Titan, a Lament Long Buried
29	Lynch Mob	The Final Ride (Live) (live album)
29	Narnia	X
29	Shinedown	Ei8ht

=== June ===
Day	Artist	Album
1	Iselder	The 38th Division
5	100 Demons	Embrace the Black Light
5	August Burns Red	Season of Surrender
5	Converge	Hum of Hurt
5	Cyhra	Requiem for a Pipe Dream
5	Evanescence	Sanctuary
5	Evergrey	Architects of a New Weave
5	Shane Embury	Bridge to Resolution
5	Üga Büga	Valley of the Wolf
5	Voivod	Symphonique (live album)
9	Iron Reagan	Demonetization (EP)
10	Black Tusk	Systems of Solitude (EP)
11	Devourment	Pious Impiety (EP)
12	Big Brave	In Grief or in Hope
12	Bolan	Gargoyle of the Garden State
12	Edu Falaschi	Mi'raj
12	Fleshcrawl	Epitome of Carnage
12	Genghis Tron	Signal Fire
12	Gideon	4×4 (EP)
12	Khemmis	Khemmis
12	Sleeping with Sirens	An Ending in Itself
12	Soulburn	Quantifying Cosmic Doom
12	Spread Eagle	The Brutal Divine
12	Still Remains	Spirit Breaker (EP)
12	Stitched Up Heart	Medusa
12	Tarja	Frisson Noir
12	Vanden Plas	AcCult II
19	Einherjer	Lifeblood
19	Judas Priest	The Best of Judas Priest (compilation album)
19	Warning	Rituals of Shame
26	Amberian Dawn	Temptation's Gates
26	Junius	Sotera
26	Masterplan	Metalmorphosis
26	Nargaroth	Apocalyptic Steel
26	Savatage	Madness Reigns from the Gutter (1990) (live album)
26	Siamese	Dissolution
26	Zao	Pillars (EP)

=== July ===
Day	Artist	Album
3	Deep Purple	Splat!
3	Dominum	Night Is Calling
3	L.A. Guns	Live from the Guild Theatre (live album and DVD)
3	Moonspell	Far from God
3	Solace	Fading Failing Ruin
10	Bring Me the Horizon	Count Your Blessings | Repented
10	DevilDriver	Strike and Kill
10	Eva Under Fire	Villainous
10	The Plot in You	The Plot in You
15	Galneryus	A Cry from the Sky Above
17	Boundaries	Yearning: The Unbeautiful After
17	Fuming Mouth	The Ringing Bell
17	Haken	In a Fever Dream (EP)
17	Loathe	A Stranger to You
17	Motionless in White	Decades
17	Protest the Hero	Within
17	Psycroptic	The Pulse of Annihilation
17	Quicksand	Bring On the Psychics
17	Reflections	Crystal Eyes
17	Stormhammer	Wrath of the Hammer
17	Tesla	Homage (covers album)
24	Avenged Sevenfold	Statica (EP)
24	Combichrist	The Venom in the Mouth of God
24	Heretic	Shape of Things to Come
24	The Hu	Hun
31	Allt	Ataraxia
31	Cipher System	Torn Between Realities (EP)
31	Dreamtale	Aetherbound
31	Finsterforst	Still
31	Five Finger Death Punch	Legacy
31	Future Palace	Resurgence
31	Limbonic Art	Arcane Past: The Celestial Grimoire (box set)
31	Sinner	Boom Bang Goodbye

=== August ===
Day	Artist	Album
7	Cancer Bats	Give Me Dirt
7	Electric Callboy	Tanzneid
7	John Carpenter	Cathedral
7	Xandria	Eclipse
10	Darko US	Cuckoo (EP)
14	Marilyn Manson	One Assassination Under God – Chapter 2
14	Racetraitor	Nobody, Son of Nobody (EP)
14	Raunchy	Prisoner
14	Saliva	Breaking Through
21	Chelsea Wolfe	The Dark
21	Dark Funeral	A Beast to Praise (live album)
21	Fen	Elemental Part One: Mourning Earth
21	Mob Rules	Stories from the Verdant Vale
21	Ocean Sleeper	Peace When I'm Dead
21	Tokyo Blade	Hoist the Colours High
28	Beartooth	Pure Ecstasy
28	Exumer	Death Mask Messiah
28	Flotsam and Jetsam	Rats in the Temple
28	Gorod	The Ember Gone
28	In This Moment	Witch
28	Kamelot	Dark Asylum
28	Ladrones	Arriba La L
28	Mastodon	Marrow Deep
28	Russian Circles	Nine
28	Triosphere	Oceans Above, Stars Below

=== September ===
Day	Artist	Album
3	Sleep	Hempispheres
4	156/Silence	From a Distance
4	Accept	Teutonic Titans 1976–2026 (compilation album)
4	Airbourne	Airbourne
4	Behemoth	I, Scvlptor
4	Chat Pile	Who Loves the Sun
4	Devil Master	Bloody Dreams
4	Green Carnation	A Dark Poem, Pt. III: The Messiah Complex
4	Judiciary	Stalagmite Angels (EP)
4	Mad Max	Stories of Destiny
4	A Night in Texas	The Darkest Side of Humanity
4	President	Blood of Your Empire
4	Showing Teeth	A Fate Worse Than Loneliness (EP)
4	Sigh	Goh-ka
11	Archgoat	Nightbringer, Lightbringer
11	Drown in Sulphur	Strix (EP)
11	Green Lung	Necropolitan
11	Mother of Millions	T
11	Texas Hippie Coalition	Band of Outlaws
11	Texas Hippie Coalition	Stoned Cowboys
11	Tygers of Pan Tang	Electrifyed
18	Anthrax	Cursum Perficio
18	Currents	Worlds Away (EP)
18	The Eternal	Obscured Horizons
18	Gary John Barden	Empowered Emotions
18	Hansen	Born with a Hammer
18	Krallice	Scour Order
18	Nonpoint	The Last Word
18	Runemagick	After Chaos: Nocturnal Vigil
18	Uncle Acid & the Deadbeats	Shapes of Midnight
25	Brotality	Jaws of the Earth
25	Cloven Hoof	Never a Prophet in Your Own Land
25	Coldrain	Optimize = Optdemise
25	Crown Magnetar	The Hollowing of Godflesh
25	Europe	Come This Madness
25	Girlschool	Nothin' to Lose in Reading 1981 (live album)
25	Godflesh	Decay
25	Lacrimas Profundere	Lay Me Down O Silent Fear
25	Metalite	Discovery
25	Noctule	Extinguish Thy Flame
25	The Ocean	Solaris
25	Sicksense	Funerals (EP)
25	Stryper	Throne of Thorns
25	Tom Morello	Everyone Gets Everything They Want
25	Wednesday 13	Un-Alive at Pol'and'Rock 2025 (live album)

=== October ===
Day	Artist	Album
2	Amon Amarth	The Allfather Awakens
2	Brymir	What We Leave Behind
2	Butcher Babies	Nightbloom
2	Escape the Fate	The Last Goodbye
2	Frozen Crown	The Legend of the Six Kings
2	Imminence	Axis Mundi
2	Miss May I	No Place for Me
2	To the Grave	Liberation Front
9	Deafheaven	At Work in the Fields of the Bomb (EP)
9	Left to Suffer	Unwelcome Guest
9	Love is Noise	The Space Between Happiness and Heartache. (EP)
9	Metal Church	Live at Rock Hard 2016 (live album)
9	Skillet	After the Storm (EP)
9	Smoulder	Witch Wife in an Alien World
9	Tungsten	Ashes
9	Wage War	Landfall
16	Elysion	Identity
16	Gloryhammer	Space 1993: Wrath of Kor-Virliath
16	Gothminister	We Are All Demons
16	Insomnium	Netherworlds
16	Joe Stump	Lord of the Strings
16	Master	Among the Seeds of Death
16	The Number Twelve Looks Like You	Howls from the Holographic Heart
16	Stoned Jesus	Songs to Moon
16	Temperance	Arcani
23	Anagnorisis	Caregriever
23	Dragonland	Prophecies
23	Entheos	Empty on the Inside
23	Forbidden	Forbidden
23	Get the Shot	Crucifixion Depiction (EP)
23	Half Me	Dogma
23	Ignea	Monumental
23	Iommi	From the Dark
23	Kat	Death Is Not Enough
23	Leng Tch'e	Hammered into Collapse (EP)
23	Mental Cruelty	Echoes of a Forlorn Land
23	Nasty	Trauma
23	Turmion Kätilöt	Resodance
23	Windwaker	Smile, You're on Camera
23	Wolves in the Throne Room	Estuary
30	Blind Channel	Painstream
30	Cirith Ungol	All the Shadows
30	Darkest Hour	Suffer Divine
30	Enslaved	Mið
30	Ministry	Hate to Go – Take Out or Delivery
30	Nickelback	Everything Under the Sun
30	Xentrix	Allied with the Enemy

=== November ===
Day	Artist	Album
6	Bangalore Choir	Payload
6	Carnifex	More than Misery
6	Cult of Luna	In the Shadow of Your Shadow
6	Extol	Aura of Decay
6	Hatebreed	Fatal Paradox
6	Hypno5e	Trame Noire
6	John Sykes	One Way (EP)
6	Midnight	Satanic Attack Live! (live album)
6	Prong	Prong
6	Thrown	Unwanted
6	Trollfest	Trollywood
9	Ice Nine Kills	A Very Vicious Christmas (EP)
13	A Killer's Confession	Victim 3
13	Amira Elfeky	It Was Only a Dream
13	Breed 77	VII
13	Cro-Mags	The Age of Quarrel: 40 Years of Quarrel (re-recorded album)
13	Heavens Edge	Philadelphia
13	Iron Savior	Deathbringer
13	Kingdom of Giants	Usurper
13	Silvertomb	The Interpretation of Nightmares
13	Sinister	Lucid Nightmares
13	Walls of Jericho	System Error: Humanity
13	Yngwie Malmsteen	Hell or High Water
13	Zebra	V
19	Angelus Apatrida	The Reckoning (EP)
20	Any Given Sin	Until We Disappear
20	Azarath	Scorn Eternal
20	Disfear	The Last Nail
20	Down	Volume V
20	Girish and the Chronicles	Disintegrate
20	Suicide Silence	Graceless
20	Thy Catafalque	XIII: Sárga erdő
20	Trivium	Crown in the Grave
20	Vanishing Point	Eremition
20	Wolf	Hour of the Wolf
27	dUg Pinnick	Abracadabra
27	King 810	La Grande Mort or Silence of God
27	Mystic Prophecy	In Metal
27	Northlane	Anemoia
27	PeelingFlesh	PeelingFlesh
27	Rosetta	Temporal Lapse
27	Whiplash	Roar

=== December ===
Day	Artist	Album
1	Infant Annihilator	The Somnial Plunge into Cyclic Ebullition
2	Hanabie.	Umami
4	Eleine	The Water Taste of Blood
4	King Gizzard & the Lizard Wizard	Entropy
11	Æther Realm	Season of Bloodshed
11	Doro	Wild at Heart
11	Hollow Front	No Love Without Despair
25	Manntra	Wild Hunt

== Artists with material in production ==
- Abysmal Dawn
- Adema – Cruel Machine
- Alcatrazz
- Annotations of an Autopsy
- Atheist
- Breaking Benjamin
- Cold
- Conception
- Dangerous Toys
- Decapitated
- Die Krupps
- Drowning Pool
- Eternal Champion
- Excel
- Extreme
- Gojira
- Gorguts
- Hacktivist
- Havok
- Hirax
- Infected Rain
- Jeffrey Nothing – 202Sick
- John Norum
- Meliah Rage – Slaves in the Afterlife
- Metal Allegiance
- Michael Schenker
- Michale Graves
- Murphy's Law
- Ne Obliviscaris
- Obliveon
- Papa Roach
- Paul Di'Anno (live album)
- Pestilence – Portals
- Quartz
- Ring of Fire
- Running Wild
- Samael
- Savatage – Curtain Call
- Sirenia – Amanita Messis
- Soilwork
- Spineshank
- Stratovarius
- Suicidal Tendencies
- Tankard
- Trouble
- Venom Inc.
- Victory
- Vinnie Vincent Invasion – Judgment Day Guitarmageddon
- Vio-lence
- Warrior Soul – Rock 'Em, Sock 'Em

Preceded by 2025	Heavy Metal Timeline; 2026	Succeeded by 2027
