= 2027 in heavy metal music =

This is a timeline documenting the events of heavy metal in the year 2027.

== Events ==
- Sharon Osbourne has announced that Ozzfest will return this year after a nine-year hiatus, with two shows in Birmingham and two in North America in the works. This will be the first Ozzfest held without her husband Ozzy, who died in 2025.
- Children of Bodom plans to celebrate their 30th anniversary of releasing music, following their reunion shows in February 2026.
- After years on hiatus, and a failed reunion in the early 2020s, Faith No More will embark on their first major tour in over a decade.
- A new Soundgarden album featuring the final recordings of Chris Cornell (who died in 2017) is expected to be released this year.

== Albums expected ==
=== January ===
Day	Artist	Album
8	Orden Ogan	Lords of the Grave
8	U.D.O.	Voodoo Ranger
15	Floor Jansen	Hytress
15	Grave Digger	Faces of Pain
15	Resolve	Spread My Ashes into Space
22	Clutch	Wasted Lands
22	Oceans Ate Alaska	Purge
22	Saxon	Gods of Thunder
22	Starkill	Hanging Up My Halo
29	Iron Mask	Crimson Prophecy
29	Memoriam	Endgame
29	Seven Kingdoms	Sono Sola
29	Seventh Wonder	VII
29	Silent Planet	Infinite Sleep

=== February ===
Day	Artist	Album
5	As I Lay Dying	As I Lay Dying
5	Charlotte Wessels	Mute Swan Empire
5	Extreme	Paris Rising (live album)
12	Currents	Our Fates Lie in Tandem
12	Cyco Miko	My Personal Revolution (compilation album)
12	Dawn of Solace	Skeletons
12	Kerry King	The End of All Gods
12	Serenity	Melancholia
19	200 Stab Wounds	Lowest Form
19	Evil Invaders	Weaponized Chaos
19	Firewind	Gods, Myths & Titans
19	Heathen	Lifetime in Hell
26	Slash featuring Myles Kennedy & the Conspirators	Flying Blind

=== March ===
Day	Artist	Album
5	Brainstorm	Nightfall
5	Dynazty	Dark Arts
5	Staind	The Space Between the Darkness and the Light
5	Tesseract	Arc_One: Obscura (EP)
12	Bruce Dickinson	PsychoGod
19	Bullet for My Valentine	Social Apocalypse
19	DragonForce	DragonForce
26	Graham Bonnet Band	Circuit Breaker

=== April ===
Day	Artist	Album
9	Fear Factory	Roboticist
9	Wolves at the Gate	Borderland
16	Oh, Sleeper	Back to the Wild
23	Primal Fear	Shadowriders

== Artists with material in production ==
- 3 Inches of Blood
- Abigail Williams
- Adrian Vandenberg
- Atheist
- Autopsy
- Belphegor
- Blind Guardian
- Body Count – Death Wish
- Candlemass
- Cattle Decapitation
- Chelsea Grin
- Cro-Mags
- Crowbar
- The Cult
- Dark Angel
- Dark Tranquillity
- Darko US
- Die Apokalyptischen Reiter
- Disturbed
- Dream Theater
- Evan Seinfeld
- Exhorder
- Filter – The Antidote
- Forced Entry (compilation album)
- Godsmack
- Hirax
- Hollywood Undead
- Ice Nine Kills – Silver Scream 3: Every Flick in the Book
- Ill Niño
- Judas Priest
- Kataklysm
- Kiss – Kiss Conquers Japan 1977 (box set)
- Lex Legion
- Lita Ford – The Bride Wore Black
- Living Colour
- Mercyful Fate
- Misery Index
- Mortal Sin (live albums and compilation album)
- Mucky Pup
- Nails
- Napalm Death
- Nevermore
- Obituary
- The Obsessed – Live Fast – Love Hard – Die Free
- Oni
- Overkill
- P.O.D.
- Porcupine Tree
- Power Trip
- Powerwolf
- Pretty Maids
- Primus
- Queensrÿche
- Raven
- Roy Khan
- Sacred Reich – Into the Abyss
- Sanctuary
- Sepultura (live album)
- Shadows Fall
- Skinless
- Snot
- Sodom
- Soil
- Sonata Arctica
- Soundgarden
- Steel Panther
- Stephen Pearcy – The Dogg Mob
- Stoned Jesus – Songs to Earth
- Stratovarius
- Sweet Savage (compilation album)
- Symphony X
- Testament
- Therapy?
- Tool
- Trixter
- Type O Negative (live album)
- Ugly Kid Joe
- Unearth
- Vader
- Vektor
- Voivod
- Yob

Preceded by 2026	Heavy Metal Timeline; 2027	Succeeded by 2028
