= Soulless Hymns =

Studio album by the Last Ten Seconds of Life
- Released: January 13, 2015
- Genre: Deathcore
- Length: 39:43
- Label: Density

The Last Ten Seconds of Life chronology
Invivo (Exvivo) (2014)	Soulless Hymns (2015)	The Violent Sound (2016)

Singles from Soulless Hymns
- 1. "North of Corpus" Released: December 2, 2014; 2. "The Box" Released: December 17, 2014

Professional ratings
Review scores
Source	Rating
Louder Sound	3.5/5

Soulless Hymns is the third studio album by American deathcore band The Last Ten Seconds of Life, released on January 13, 2015, via Density Records. It is the band's final album with vocalist Storm Strope and bassist Anthony Madara. The band released "North of Corpus" as a pre-release single on December 2, 2014.

== Track listing ==
1. "As the World Turns Over" – 2:23
2. "The Box" – 3:46
3. "North of Corpus" – 4:08
4. "Meant to Be Free" – 2:58
5. "Guillotine Queen" – 2:39
6. "Pain Is Pleasure" – 2:31
7. "Ballad of the Butcher" – 4:04
8. "Sacrifice (The Prince)" – 4:42
9. "Changing Forms" – 3:43
10. "Heavy Headed" – 2:48
11. "Junkie - Sprite" – 2:47
12. "The Dream Is Dead" – 3:14

== Personnel ==
- Storm Strope – vocals
- Wyatt McLaughlin – guitars
- Anthony Madara – bass
- Christian Fisher – drums
