= Pain Again =

Studio album by Varials
- Released: August 11, 2017
- Genres: Metalcore; beatdown hardcore
- Length: 37:42
- Label: Fearless
- Producer: Josh Shroeder

Varials chronology
Pain Again (2017)	In Darkness (2019)

Singles from Pain Again
- 1. "Anything to Numb" Released: July 6, 2017; 2. "E.D.A." Released: August 10, 2017; 3. "Empire of Dirt" Released: May 16, 2018

Professional ratings
Review scores
Source	Rating
Dead Press	8/10
Exclaim!	7/10
New Noise	4.5/5 stars
Sound Fiction	8.3/10

Pain Again is the debut studio album by Varials. It was released on August 11, 2017 through Fearless Records.

== Background ==
Varials signed with Fearless Records on July 6, 2017, and announced their debut album Pain Again, produced by Josh Schroeder, would be released on August 11. The lead single, "Anything to Numb" was released alongside a music video that day. The second single, "E.D.A." had a music video released on August 10. The music video for the third single "Empire of Dirt", was released in May 2018.

== In popular culture ==
Professional wrestler Masada used the song "Anything to Numb" as his entrance music during his time in Independents run for several companies such as XPW.

== Track listing ==
No.	Title	Length
1.	"New Damnation"	3:52
2.	"God Talk" (featuring Chad Ruhlig)	3:37
3.	"Anything to Numb"	3:12
4.	"E.D.A."	2:41
5.	"Colder Brother"	4:12
6.	"Pain Again"	3:33
7.	"Abacus"	3:18
8.	"Empire of Dirt" (featuring Bryan Garris)	3:12
9.	"Deadweather II"	3:23
10.	"Deliverance"	3:52
11.	"To Lay in Sin"	2:50

Notes

- "E.D.A." stands for "Everyone Dies Alone".

== Personnel ==
- Travis Tabron - vocals
- Mitchell Rogers - lead guitar
- James Hohenwarter - rhythm guitar
- Mike Foley - bass
- Sean Rauchut - drums
