= Feed Me Violence =

Studio album by Evil Invaders
- Released: 29 September 2017
- Studios: Black Out Studio; Waveshape Audio; Evil Invaders Headquarters
- Genres: Speed metal, thrash metal
- Length: 35:53
- Label: Napalm

Evil Invaders chronology
In for the Kill (2016)	Feed Me Violence (2017)	Shattering Reflection (2022)

Evil Invaders studio album chronology
Pulses of Pleasure (2015)	Feed Me Violence (2017)	Shattering Reflection (2022)

Singles from Feed Me Violence
- 1. "As Life Slowly Fades" Released: 14 September 2017; 2. "Broken Dreams in Isolation" Released: 5 September 2018

Professional ratings
Review scores
Source	Rating
Metal Hammer	4/7
Metal.de	7/10
Metalfan.nl	86/100
Powermetal.de	9.5/10
Rock Hard	8/10
Stormbringer	4/5

Feed Me Violence is the second studio album by Belgian speed metal band Evil Invaders. It was released on 29 September 2017, through Napalm Records.

== Track listing ==
No.	Title	Length
1.	"Mental Penitentiary"	3:47
2.	"As Life Slowly Fades"	4:07
3.	"Suspended Reanimation"	0:51
4.	"Broken Dreams in Isolation"	4:08
5.	"Feed Me Violence"	3:44
6.	"Oblivion"	4:48
7.	"Shades of Solitude"	2:42
8.	"Anger Within"	5:08
9.	"Among the Depths of Sanity"	6:38
Total length:		35:53

== Personnel ==
- Johannes Van Audenhove – vocals, guitars
- Max Mayhem – guitars
- Joeri van de Schoot – bass
- Senne Jacobs – drums
