= No Name Graves =

Studio album by The Last Ten Seconds of Life
- Released: February 9, 2024
- Genre: Deathcore
- Length: 34:33
- Label: Unique Leader

The Last Ten Seconds of Life chronology
The Last Ten Seconds of Life (2022)	No Name Graves (2024)	The Dead Ones (2026)

Professional ratings
Review scores
Source	Rating
Boolin Tunes	5/10
Ghost Cult Magazine	7/10
Metal Injection	8/10
MetalSucks	7/10

No Name Graves is the seventh studio album by American deathcore band The Last Ten Seconds of Life, released on February 9, 2024. The album has received mixed-to-positive feedback from reviewers. It is the band's first full-length album with their new lineup that includes vocalist Tyler Beam, bassist Andrew Petway, and drummer Dylan Potts. The album features guest vocals by Ricky Myers (Suffocation), Devin Swank (Sanguisugabogg), and Ben Mason (Bound in Fear). The band released the song "Of All Humanity, the Sum" as a pre-release single on December 5, 2023.

== Track listing ==
1. "Of All Humanity, the Sum" – 3:22
2. "Letania Infernalis" (featuring Ricky Myers) – 4:08
3. "No Name Graves" (featuring Devin Swank) – 3:16
4. "Body of a Bastard" – 3:34
5. "Saint No More" (featuring Ben Mason) – 3:39
6. "Feel My Fangs in You" – 2:49
7. "Doomsday Death Trap" – 4:16
8. "Broken Glass Incantation" – 3:09
9. "Debt to the Dark" – 3:04
10. "Thirst for Extinction" – 3:14

== Personnel ==
- Tyler Beam – vocals
- Wyatt McLaughlin – guitars
- Andrew Petway – bass
- Dylan Potts – drums
