= Terror Hungry =

Studio album by Lost Society
- Released: April 4, 2014
- Genre: Thrash metal
- Length: 48:57
- Label: Nuclear Blast
- Producer: Nino Laurenne

Lost Society chronology
Fast Loud Death (2013)	Terror Hungry (2014)	Braindead (2016)

Professional ratings
Review scores
Source	Rating
Imperiumi	7.5/10
Kaaoszine	9/10
Metal Forces	6.5/10
Scream Magazine	4/6
Soundi	4/5

Terror Hungry is the second studio album by Finnish metal band Lost Society, released on April 4, 2014. A music video for the title track was released two days prior, on April 2, 2014. The album debuted at number 6 on the Finnish official albums chart.

== Track listing ==
Terror Hungry track listing
No.	Title	Length
1.	"Purgatory"	1:31
2.	"Game Over"	4:12
3.	"Attaxic"	3:52
4.	"Lethal Pleasure"	4:01
5.	"Terror Hungry"	2:57
6.	"Snowroad Blowout"	3:02
7.	"Tyrant Takeover"	5:30
8.	"Overdosed Brain"	5:08
9.	"Thrashed Reality"	3:37
10.	"F.F.E."	2:40
11.	"Brewtal Awakening"	5:14
12.	"Mosh It Up"	3:53
13.	"Wasted After Midnight"	3:20
14.	"You Can't Stop Rock 'n' Roll" (Twisted Sister cover) (special edition bonus track)	4:37
Total length:		53:34

== Personnel ==
- Samy Elbanna – vocals, guitar
- Arttu Lesonen – guitar
- Mirko Lehtinen – bass
- Ossi Paananen – drums

=== Production ===
- Nino Laurenne – producer, recording, mixing
- Jan Meininghaus – cover art
