= Impulse Voices =

Studio album by Plini
- Released: 27 November 2020
- Recorded: March – mid-2020
- Genre: Progressive metal; jazz fusion; instrumental rock
- Length: 38:17
- Label: Self-released
- Producer: Plini

Plini chronology
Handmade Cities (2016)	Impulse Voices (2020)	An Unnameable Desire (2026)

Professional ratings
Review scores
Source	Rating
Sonic Perspectives	8.3/10

Impulse Voices is the second studio album by Australian guitarist Plini.

== Background ==
Impulse Voices was composed, produced, arranged and mixed by Plini, and recorded in his own bedroom studio. Other members participating in the album include Chris Allison on drums and Simon Grove on bass, both of whom worked remotely and separately due to COVID, with additional production by Devesh Dayal of Indian/American progressive metal band Skyharbor and Aleksandra Djelmash, along with guests Dave Mackay on piano & synthesizer, John Waugh on saxophone, Amy Turk on electro-acoustic harp.

While the album was recorded from March to May 2020, it was initially scheduled for release the following month, followed in July by touring in Europe and the United States, but due to the pandemic, the tour was cancelled, recording time was extended, and the album was not mastered until October.

== Release and promotion ==
Impulse Voices was released on November 27, 2020. Over a month prior, on October 8, 2020, the album's first single was released and streamed, titled "I'll Tell You Someday".

A remix EP was made for Impulse Voices and streamed in May 2021.

Plini supported the album with a three-day tour in Australia, from July 15 to 17, 2021.

== Track listing ==
All tracks composed by Plini.

No.	Title	Length
1.	"I'll Tell You Someday"	4:05
2.	"Papelillo"	4:11
3.	"Perfume"	4:06
4.	"Last Call"	3:55
5.	"Impulse Voices"	3:18
6.	"Pan"	5:33
7.	"Ona / 1154"	4:09
8.	"The Glass Bead Game"	9:00

== Personnel ==
=== Musicians ===
- Plini – guitars
- Simon Grove – bass
- Chris Allison – drums

=== Guests and production ===
- Dave Mackay - piano & synthesizer on “Papelillo”, “Perfume”, “Last Call” and “Ona / 1154”
- Devesh Dayal & Aleksandra Djelmash - voices & additional production on “I’ll Tell You Someday”, “Pan” and “The Glass Bead Game”
- John Waugh - saxophone on “Pan”
- Amy Turk - harp solo on “The Glass Bead Game”
- Simon Grove – drums mixing
- Plini – mixing
- Ermin Hamidovic – mastering
