= Shattering Reflection =

Shattered Reflection

Studio album by Evil Invaders
- Released: 1 April 2022
- Studios: Old Road Studio; Tube Driven Studio; Evil Invaders Headquarters
- Genres: Speed metal, thrash metal
- Length: 43:00
- Label: Napalm

Evil Invaders chronology
Feed Me Violence (2017)	Shattered Reflection (2022)	Weaponized Chaos (2027)

Professional ratings
Review scores
Source	Rating
Metal Hammer Germany	5/7
Metal Injection	10/10
Metal.de	8/10
Metalfan.nl	84/100
Powermetal.de	9/10
Rock Hard	8/10
Stormbringer	3.5/5

Shattered Reflection is the third studio album by Belgian speed metal band Evil Invaders. It was released on 1 April 2022, through Napalm Records. Frontman Johannes Van Audenhove has stated that the lyrics for the album were "all inspired by things that we have to deal with in our daily lives: The death of loved ones, being stabbed in the back, insomnia, dwelling in the past, anger and frustration, lust, the evil side of your mind that makes you come up with some pretty sick stuff…"

== Track listing ==
No.	Title	Length
1.	"Hissing in Crescendo"	4:25
2.	"Die for Me"	3:47
3.	"In Deepest Black"	4:52
4.	"Sledgehammer Justice"	4:37
5.	"Forgotten Memories"	3:33
6.	"Realm of Shadows"	1:10
7.	"Eternal Darkness"	6:31
8.	"My World"	4:12
9.	"Aeon"	3:25
10.	"The Circle"	6:28
Total length:		43:00

== Personnel ==
- Johannes Van Audenhove - vocals, guitars
- Max Mayhem - guitars
- Joeri van de Schoot - bass
- Senne Jacobs - drums
