= The Violent Sound =

Studio album by the Last Ten Seconds of Life
- Released: October 21, 2016
- Genre: Deathcore; nu metal
- Length: 40:13
- Label: Siege Music

The Last Ten Seconds of Life chronology
| Soulless Hymns (2015) | The Violent Sound (2016) | Machina Non Grata (2019) |

Professional ratings
Review scores
| Source | Rating |
|---|---|
| Altcorner.com | 10/10 |
| Invicta Magazine | 8.5/10 |
| Louder Sound | 3.5/5 |

The Violent Sound is the fourth studio album by American deathcore band the Last Ten Seconds of Life, released on October 21, 2016, via Siege Music. It is the band's first album with vocalist John Robert Centorrino and bassist Mike Menocker, and their final album with founding drummer Christian Fisher. The band released a music video for "Little Black Line" on October 24, 2016.

== Track listing ==
1. "Little Black Line" – 2:58
2. "The Drip" – 3:20
3. "Bloodlust" – 2:47
4. "Six Feet" – 3:58
5. "The Violent Sound" – 3:23
6. "Casanova" – 3:17
7. "Bag of Bones" – 3:33
8. "Switch" – 3:15
9. "Blind Faith" – 3:43
10. "Wise Blood" – 3:40
11. "Social Suicide" – 3:11
12. "Last Words" – 3:08

== Personnel ==
- John Robert Centorrino – vocals
- Wyatt McLaughlin – guitars
- Mike Menocker – bass
- Christian Fisher – drums
