= Machina Non Grata =

Studio album by the Last Ten Seconds of Life
- Released: January 11, 2019
- Genres: Deathcore; beatdown hardcore
- Length: 50:33

The Last Ten Seconds of Life chronology
| The Violent Sound (2016) | Machina Non Grata (2019) | The Last Ten Seconds of Life (2022) |

Professional ratings
Review scores
| Source | Rating |
|---|---|
| Metal Noise | 7/10 |
| Riff Valley | 8.2/10 |

Machina Non Grata is the fifth studio album by American deathcore band The Last Ten Seconds of Life, released on January 11, 2019. It is the band's only album with drummer David Boughter. The album received mildly positive feedback from reviewers and critics. The band released the song "Phycophrenia" as a pre-release single on November 30, 2018.

== Track listing ==
1. "Glory" – 2:13
2. "Sweet Chin Music" – 4:20
3. "Psychophrenia" – 3:10
4. "Live on Broadway" – 3:08
5. "These Guns Are Made for Shootin'" – 3:47
6. "Axe to Grind" – 3:10
7. "Tsavo" – 3:42
8. "Aphrodite" – 3:43
9. "Dirt Nap Atrophy" – 3:04
10. "Gods / Slaves" – 3:58
11. "The Impossible Product" – 4:24
12. "Soul Erased" – 4:40
13. "Return Me to the Ground" – 3:28
14. "Machina Non Grata" – 5:47

== Personnel ==
- John Robert Centorrino – vocals
- Wyatt McLaughlin – guitars
- Mike Menocker – bass
- David Boughter – drums
- Jamie Hanks - vocals on "Sweet Chin Music"
