= Pulses of Pleasure =

Studio album by Evil Invaders
- Released: 28 February 2015
- Studios: Grindstone Recordings; Waveshape Audio; Sint-Leonarduskerk Molenbeersel
- Genres: Thrash metal, speed metal
- Length: 42:15
- Label: Napalm
- Producer: Enzo Marangelli

Evil Invaders chronology
Evil Invaders (2013)	Pulses of Pleasure (2015)	In for the Kill (2016)

Evil Invaders studio album chronology
Pulses of Pleasure (2015)	Feed Me Violence (2017)

Professional ratings
Review scores
Source	Rating
Louder Sound	4/5
Metal.de	7/10
PopMatters	5/10
Powermetal.de	7/10
Rock Hard	7.5/10

Pulses of Pleasure is the debut studio album by Belgian thrash metal band Evil Invaders. It was released on 28 February 2015, through Napalm Records.

== Track listing ==
No.	Title	Length
1.	"Fast, Loud 'n' Rude"	5:30
2.	"Pulses of Pleasure"	5:18
3.	"Eclipse of the Mind"	5:33
4.	"Siren"	5:18
5.	"Stairway to Insanity"	5:26
6.	"Shot to Paradise"	3:48
7.	"Venom"	3:42
8.	"Blinded"	2:02
9.	"Master of Illusion"	5:38
Total length:		42:15

== Personnel ==
- Johannes Van Audenhove – vocals, guitars
- Sam Lemmens – guitars
- Nico Beekwilder – bass
- Senne Jacobs – drums
