= Scars for You to Remember =

Studio album by Varials
- Released: October 14, 2022
- Recorded: 2020–2021
- Genres: Nu metalcore; hardcore punk
- Length: 32:31
- Label: Fearless
- Producer: Josh Schroeder

Varials chronology
| In Darkness (2019) | Scars for You to Remember (2022) | Where the Light Leaves (2026) |

Professional ratings
Review scores
| Source | Rating |
|---|---|
| Boolin Tunes | 4/10 |
| Distorted Sound | 7/10 |
| Metal Injection | 7.5/10 |

Scars for You to Remember is the third studio album by Varials. It was released on October 14, 2022, through Fearless Records. It is their first release to feature former lead guitarist Shane Lyons as rhythm guitarist, and only release to have Mitchell Rogers as vocalist after dropping his role as lead guitarist, after former vocalist Travis Tabron announced his departure from the band in 2020 due to mental health reasons. and last to feature Mitchell Rogers and James Hohenwarter, who both left the band on October 27, 2024.

== Background and promotion ==
In late 2020 and early 2021, the band began working with producer Josh Schroeder on a new EP. They later decided to switch from an EP to their third studio album. Varials released a music video for ".50" on August 26, 2022. The release of ".50" came with the announcement that the album, titled Scars for You to Remember, would be released through Fearless on October 14, 2022.

== Track listing ==
Scars for You to Remember track listing
| No. | Title | Length |
|---|---|---|
| 1. | "A Body Wrapped in Plastic: Prologue" | 3:20 |
| 2. | "The Cycle of Violence: Chapter 1" | 2:37 |
| 3. | "Ritual Division (Haüs)" | 3:09 |
| 4. | "Scars for You to Remember" | 2:22 |
| 5. | "Day 3: Revenge" (featuring Matt Honeycutt, Shaolin G, and Andrew Hileman) | 3:44 |
| 6. | "Phantom Pain: Chapter 2" | 1:04 |
| 7. | "Circles" | 3:18 |
| 8. | "Phantom Power" (featuring Darius Tehrani) | 3:46 |
| 9. | "The Gold Room: Chapter 3" | 1:01 |
| 10. | ".50" | 3:03 |
| 11. | "You Were Never Safe Here: Chapter 4" | 0:42 |
| 12. | "Halo of the Sun" | 3:25 |
| Total length: | | 32:31 |

== Personnel ==
Varials

- Mitchell Rogers – vocals
- James Hohenwarter – lead guitar
- Shane Lyons – rhythm guitar
- Mike Foley – bass guitar
- Sean Rauchut – drums
