= The Last Ten Seconds of Life (album) =

Studio album by The Last Ten Seconds of Life
- Released: January 28, 2022
- Genre: Nu metal; deathcore
- Length: 50:37
- Label: Unique Leader

The Last Ten Seconds of Life chronology
Machina Non Grata (2019)	The Last Ten Seconds of Life (2022)	No Name Graves (2024)

Professional ratings
Review scores
Source	Rating
Angry Metal Guy	1/5
Metal Injection	8/10
Noizze	7/10

The Last Ten Seconds of Life is the self-titled sixth studio album by American metal band The Last Ten Seconds of Life, released on January 28, 2022. The album received both negative and positive feedback from critics. It is the band's last album with vocalist John Robert Centorrino and bassist Mike Menocker, and the only one with drummer Steven Sanchez, all of whom left the band over a month after the album's release.

== Track listing ==
1. "Invictus Unto Fire" – 3:22
2. "Zapffe Isn't Invited to the Party" – 2:20
3. "The Sabbath" – 4:26
4. "Birth of the Butcher" – 4:46
5. "Altar of Poison" – 4:47
6. "Guillotine Queen (Redux)" – 3:34
7. "Hate What You Love" – 3:27
8. "Vampire (A Blood Ballad)" – 6:16
9. "Glory Be 2 Misery" – 5:04
10. "Wasted (Interlude)" – 0:49
11. "Sickness in Seattle" – 4:11
12. "Suicide Watch" – 2:02
13. "A Lesson on Self-Preservation" – 3:10
14. "Procession" – 2:23

== Personnel ==
- John Robert Centorrino – vocals
- Wyatt McLaughlin – guitars
- Mike Menocker – bass
- Steven Sanchez – drums
