= Handmade Cities =

Studio album by Plini
- Released: 26 August 2016
- Genres: Progressive metal; progressive rock; instrumental rock
- Length: 34:37
- Label: Self-released
- Producer: Plini

Plini chronology
Handmade Cities (2016)	Impulse Voices (2020)

Handmade Cities is the first studio album by Australian guitarist Plini. The album was composed, produced, arranged, and mixed by Plini.

== Reception ==
Professional ratings
Review scores
Source	Rating
Sputnik Music	4/5 stars

Sputnik Music gave the album 4/5. Peter Hodgson of Beat commented that Plini is "making music of such world-class quality on his first full-length record". Steve Vai described the album as being "one of the finest, forward-thinking, melodic, rhythmically and harmonically deep instrumental guitar records [he has] ever heard".

The title track gained attention when the guitar rhythm during its solo was claimed to be plagiarized and said to sound like the guitar solo in American pop singer Doja Cat's 2020 metal version of her single "Say So" which was performed during the MTV Europe Music Awards ceremony. A month later Plini said that Doja Cat left an apologetic message for him on social media. Regarding the alleged plagiarism, Plini said that "the lack of prior communication about it or proper credit upon release is disappointing but not particularly surprising in a sector of the industry that is usually more interested in clout than creativity. (it's being sorted now, but would have been cooler a million views ago)".

== Track listing ==
All tracks composed by Plini

No.	Title	Length
1.	"Electric Sunrise"	5:05
2.	"Handmade Cities"	4:45
3.	"Inhale"	4:57
4.	"Every Piece Matters"	3:40
5.	"Pastures"	7:33
6.	"Here We Are, Again"	2:37
7.	"Cascade"	6:00

== Personnel ==
=== Musicians ===
- Plini – guitars
- Simon Grove – bass
- Troy Wright – drums

=== Production ===
- Simon Grove – drums mixing
- Plini – mixing
- Ermin Hamidovic – mastering
