= Braindead (album) =

Studio album by Lost Society
- Released: February 12, 2016
- Recorded: December 17, 2015
- Genre: Thrash metal
- Length: 41:18
- Label: Nuclear Blast
- Producer: Nino Laurenne

Lost Society chronology
Terror Hungry (2014)	Braindead (2016)	No Absolution (2020)

Professional ratings
Review scores
Source	Rating
All About the Rock	6/10
Aux Portes Du Metal	16.5/20
Distorted Sound	10/10
Imperiumi	9/10
Kaaoszine	8.5/10
Metal Injection	4/10
Metal.de	7/10
Soundi	4/5

Braindead is the third studio album by Finnish metal band Lost Society, released on February 12, 2016. A music video for the album's first song, "I Am the Antidote", was released on December 17, 2015. The album debuted at number 3 on the Finnish official album chart.

== Track listing ==
Braindead track listing
No.	Title	Length
1.	"I Am the Antidote"	6:12
2.	"Riot"	4:19
3.	"Mad Torture"	5:37
4.	"Hollow Eyes"	6:22
5.	"Rage Me Up"	4:14
6.	"Hangover Activator"	3:33
7.	"Only My Death Is Certain"	8:05
8.	"PST 88" (Pantera cover)	2:56
9.	"Terror Hungry (Californian Easy Listening Version)" (special edition bonus track)	4:33
10.	"Overdosed Brain (live)" (special edition bonus track)	5:24
Total length:		51:15

== Personnel ==
- Samy Elbanna – vocals, guitar
- Arttu Lesonen – guitar
- Mirko Lehtinen – bass
- Ossi Paananen – drums

=== Production ===
- Nino Laurenne – producer, recording, mixing
- Svante Forsbäck – mastering
- Jan Meininghaus – cover art
- Tim Wezel – additional art
