= In for the Kill (EP) =

EP by Evil Invaders
- Released: 30 September 2016
- Studios: Grindstone Recordings; Waveshape Audio; Evil Invaders Headquarters
- Genres: Thrash metal, speed metal
- Length: 20:34
- Label: Napalm

Evil Invaders chronology
Pulses of Pleasure (2015)	In for the Kill (2016)	Feed Me Violence (2017)

Professional ratings
Review scores
Source	Rating
Metal.de	7/10
Time for Metal	6.5/10

In for the Kill is the second EP by Belgian thrash metal band Evil Invaders. It was released on 30 September 2016, through Napalm Records. "Raising Hell" was released in advance on 21 September 2016.

== Track listing ==
No.	Title	Length
1.	"As Life Slowly Fades"	4:24
2.	"Raising Hell"	4:28
3.	"Pulses of Pleasure (live)"	6:03
4.	"Victim of Sacrifice (live)"	5:39
Total length:		20:34

== Personnel ==
- Johannes Van Audenhove - vocals, guitars
- Max Mayhem - guitars, bass
- Joeri van de Schoot - bass
- Senne Jacobs - drums
