= If the Sky Came Down =

Studio album by Lost Society
- Released: 7 October 2022
- Genre: Metalcore, groove metal, nu metal
- Length: 42:28
- Label: Nuclear Blast
- Producer: Joonas Parkkonen

Lost Society chronology
No Absolution (2020)	If the Sky Came Down (2022)	Hell Is a State of Mind (2026)

Professional ratings
Review scores
Source	Rating
Ghost Cult Magazine	7/10
Imperiumi	7/10
Inferno	4/5
Kaaoszine	4.5/5
Soundi	2/5

If the Sky Came Down is the fifth studio album by Finnish metal band Lost Society, released on 7 October 2022, through Nuclear Blast. The album spawned the singles "112", "Stitches", and "What Have I Done", the lattermost single receiving a music video filmed at the 2022 Tuska Festival.

The album debuted at number 3 on the Finnish official album chart and number 2 on the physical album chart. Similar to the previous album, No Absolution, the band continues the modern direction of incorporating metalcore, groove metal and nu metal sounds, ditching most of their earlier thrash metal elements.

== Track listing ==
1. "112" – 3:49
2. "What Have I Done" – 4:02
3. "(We are the) Braindead" – 3:39
4. "Stitches" – 3:29
5. "Awake" – 5:12
6. "Underneath" – 4:04
7. "Creature" – 3:57
8. "Hurt Me" – 4:28
9. "If the Sky Came Down" – 4:30
10. "Suffocating" – 5:18

== Personnel ==
- Samy Elbanna – vocals, guitar
- Arttu Lesonen – guitar
- Mirko Lehtinen – bass
- Tapani Fagerström – drums

=== Production ===
- Joonas Parkkonen – producer, mixing
- Svante Forsbäck – mastering
- Pauli Souka – cover art, layout
