= In Darkness (Varials album) =

Studio album by Varials
- Released: October 11, 2019
- Genres: Metalcore; nu metal
- Length: 41:15
- Label: Fearless
- Producer: Josh Shroeder

Varials chronology
Pain Again (2017)	In Darkness (2019)	Scars for You to Remember (2022)

Singles from In Darkness
- 1. "I Suffocate" Released: September 23, 2019; 2. "Bleeding" Released: September 23, 2019; 3. "Romance" Released: September 23, 2019; 4. "The Love Machine" Released: September 23, 2019

Professional ratings
Review scores
Source	Rating
Dead Press!	9/10 stars

In Darkness is the second studio album by Varials. It was released on October 11, 2019, through Fearless Records. A music video for the title track was released a day prior. Varials supported Counterparts (whom their vocalist Brendan Murphy guest appears on "South of One") on their Private Room 2.0 Tour to promote the album. It is their last release to feature Travis Tabron as vocalist.

== Musical style ==
Lyrically, the album touches on the subject of depression, anxiety, and loneliness. Sonically, the album takes influence from artists such as Nine Inch Nails, Slipknot, and Deftones, while also including a heavy twist that Tess Hofer of Dead Press! called "the musical equivalent of standing in a battlefield but without the guns and violence".

== Track listing ==
No.	Title	Length
1.	"Wound"	3:57
2.	"I Suffocate"	4:01
3.	"In Darkness"	2:37
4.	"Bleeding"	2:44
5.	"[Fear]"	0:43
6.	"South of One" (featuring Brendan Murphy)	2:44
7.	"Romance"	2:22
8.	"Obstacle III"	3:27
9.	"I Against I"	3:18
10.	"Splinter"	2:57
11.	"The Love Machine"	2:54
12.	"[Save Room]"	1:49
13.	"Deathsong"	3:19
14.	"[Untitled]"	0:47
15.	"Maze"	3:37
Total length:		41:15

== Personnel ==
Varials

- Travis Tabron – vocals
- Mitchell Rogers – lead guitar, vocals
- James Hohenwarter – rhythm guitar
- Mike Foley – bass
- Sean Rauchut – drums

Additional musicians

- Brendan Murphy (Counterparts) – vocals (6)

Additional personnel

- Cody Demavivas – A&R
- Errick Easterday – artwork, design
- Brad Wiseman – booking (agent)
- Mike Tompa – engineer (vocal features), producer (vocal features) (6)
- Jeff McKinnon – engineer (vocals, additional) (1, 2, 6 & 15)
- Carl Severson – management
- Josh Schroeder – production, recording, mixing, mastering
- Marc Mutnansky – project manager
