= Invivo (Exvivo) =

Studio album by the Last Ten Seconds of Life
- Released: January 20, 2014
- Genre: Deathcore
- Length: 40:47
- Label: Density

The Last Ten Seconds of Life chronology
Know Your Exits (2011)	Invivo (Exvivo) (2014)	Soulless Hymns (2015)

Professional ratings
Review scores
Source	Rating
Already Heard	3.5/5
Hit the Floor	7/10
Louder Sound	3.5/5
The Music	4/5
Powermetal.de	4.5/5

Invivo (Exvivo) is the second studio album by American deathcore band the Last Ten Seconds of Life, released on January 20, 2014, via Density Records. It is the band's first album with bassist Anthony Madara. The album has received positive feedback from reviewers.

== Track listing ==
1. "Fertile Steps" – 4:23
2. "False Awakening" – 2:27
3. "A Dime a Dozen" – 2:58
4. "Numbskull" – 3:18
5. "The Face" – 3:31
6. "Morality" – 4:42
7. "Haste Makes Waste" – 4:06
8. "Deadfast" – 3:48
9. "Skeletal" – 4:08
10. "Ego Death" – 7:26

== Personnel ==
- Storm Strope – vocals
- Wyatt McLaughlin – guitars
- Anthony Madara – bass
- Christian Fisher – drums
