= Rien Ne Devait Mourir =

Studio album by Angellore
- Released: 14 February 2020
- Recorded: 2016–2019
- Genre: Gothic metal, doom metal
- Length: 61:10
- Label: Finisterian Dead End; Shunu Records
- Producer: Florent Krist

Angellore chronology
La Litanie des Cendres (2015)	Rien Ne Devait Mourir (2020)	Nocturnes (2026)

Professional ratings
Review scores
Source	Rating
Aux Portes Du Metal	19/20
GBHBL	7.5/10
Valkyries Webzine	8/10

Rien Ne Devait Mourir (French for "Nothing Was Supposed to Die") is the third full-length album by the French doom metal/gothic metal band Angellore. The album was originally scheduled to be released in late 2019, but was delayed and released by Shunu Records and Finisterian Dead End and on vinyl via The Vinyl Division in February 2020.

== Track listing ==
No.	Title	Length
1.	"A Romance of Thorns"	20:07
2.	"Dreams (Along the Trail)"	5:13
3.	"Drowned Divine"	14:11
4.	"Blood for Lavinia"	4:40
5.	"Sur les sentiers de lune"	5:44
6.	"Que les lueurs se dispersent"	11:15
Total length:		61:10

== Personnel ==
- Rosarius – lead vocals, guitars, keyboards, grand piano, church organ
- Walran – lead vocals, keyboards, grand piano
- Lucia – female vocals
- Celin – bass, harsh vocals
- Ronnie – drums, percussion, backing vocals
