= La Litanie des Cendres =

Studio album by Angellore
- Released: 21 August 2015
- Recorded: July 2012 - April 2014
- Studios: EverTone Studio, Gignac-L'Inerte (France)
- Genres: Gothic metal, death-doom
- Length: 58:38
- Label: Shunu Records
- Producers: Angellore & Florent Krist

Angellore chronology
| Errances (2012) | La Litanie des Cendres (2015) | Rien Ne Devait Mourir (2020) |

Professional ratings
Review scores
| Source | Rating |
|---|---|
| Aux Portes Du Metal | 19/20 |
| Scream Magazine | 5/6 |

La Litanie des Cendres is the second full-length album by the French doom metal/gothic metal band Angellore. The title is French for 'the litany of the ashes'. The album was released both in a digital version and CD through Shunu Records on 21 August 2015. The CD version features a special digipak design and cards instead of a booklet. Produced by Angellore and Florent Krist, it was mastered by Markus Skroch from the Kalthallen Studios (Germany). The layout and design is by Florent Castellani. The songs were written from 2009 to 2011 during the Errances sessions.

== Track listing ==
| No. | Title | Lyrics | Music | Length |
|---|---|---|---|---|
| 1. | "A Shrine of Clouds" | Rosarius/Walran | Rosarius/Walran | 13:47 |
| 2. | "Still Glowing Ashes" | Rosarius/Walran | Rosarius/Walran | 10:26 |
| 3. | "Twilight's Embrace" | Walran | Walran | 09:28 |
| 4. | "Inertia" | Rosarius | Rosarius | 06:25 |
| 5. | "Moonflower" | Rosarius/Walran | Rosarius/Walran | 18:29 |
| Total length: | | | | 58:38 |

== Personnel ==
=== Angellore ===
- Rosarius – Electric & acoustic guitars, bass guitars, vocals, keyboards
- Walran – Vocals, keyboards
- Ronnie – Drums

=== Session members ===
- Lucia - Vocals
- Catherine Arquez – violin
