= Evil Invaders (EP) =

EP by Evil Invaders
- Released: 2 February 2013
- Studios: Evil Invaders Headquarters; The Basement home studio
- Genres: Thrash metal, speed metal
- Length: 27:07
- Label: Empire

Evil Invaders chronology
Evil Invaders (2013)	Pulses of Pleasure (2015)

Professional ratings
Review scores
Source	Rating
Eternal Terror	3.5/6
Metalfan.nl	82/100
Metal.de	7/10
Powermetal.de	8.5/10
Rock Hard	8.5/10
Stormbringer	4/5

Evil Invaders is the debut EP by Belgian thrash metal band, Evil Invaders. It was released on 2 February 2013, through Empire Records.

== Track listing ==
No.	Title	Length
1.	"Victim of Sacrifice"	5:33
2.	"Driving Fast"	4:24
3.	"Tortured by the Beast"	4:16
4.	"Speed Invasion"	3:38
5.	"Alcoholic Maniac"	3:51
6.	"Evil Invaders"	5:25
Total length:		27:07

== Personnel ==
- Johannes Van Audenhove – vocals, guitars
- Sam Lemmens – guitars
- Pussymagnet Alain – bass
- Senne Jacobs – drums
