= No Absolution =

Studio album by Lost Society
- Released: 21 February 2020
- Genre: Metalcore, death metal, groove metal, nu metal
- Length: 47:28
- Label: Self-released
- Producer: Joonas Parkkonen

Lost Society chronology
Braindead (2016)	No Absolution (2020)	If the Sky Came Down (2022)

Professional ratings
Review scores
Source	Rating
Imperiumi	7.5/10
Kaaoszine	4/5
Soundi	3/5
Tuonela	9/10
V2	3/5

No Absolution is the fourth studio album by Finnish metal band Lost Society, released on 21 February 2020. The album is the last to feature drummer Ossi Paananen, who left the band in later that year, and the only album released independently, during the band's brief departure from Nuclear Blast.

On this album, the band moves away from the thrash metal style on the first three records and instead moves into a more modern direction of metalcore, death metal, groove metal and nu metal.

The album debuted at number 6 on the Finnish official albums chart and number 4 on the physical albums chart.

== Track listing ==
1. "Nonbeliever" – 4:31
2. "No Absolution" – 4:09
3. "Blood on Your Hands" – 3:54
4. "Artificial" – 4:31
5. "Pray for Death" – 3:43
6. "Outbreak (No Rest for the Sickest)" – 4:38
7. "My Prophecy" – 3:41
8. "Mark Upon Your Skin" – 3:57
9. "Worthless" – 3:03
10. "Deliver Me" – 5:03
11. "Into Eternity" – 6:32

== Personnel ==
- Samy Elbanna – vocals, guitar
- Arttu Lesonen – guitar
- Mirko Lehtinen – bass
- Ossi Paananen – drums

=== Guests ===
- Jarkko Nieminen – percussion on "Blood on Your Hands", additional guitar on "Outbreak (No Rest for the Sickest)" and "Deliver Me"
- Joonas Parkkonen (Santa Cruz) – additional guitar on "Pray for Death", "Outbreak (No Rest for the Sickest)" and "Deliver Me"
- Tomi Joutsen (Amorphis) – backing vocals on "Artificial" and "Worthless"
- Mika "Gas Lipstick" Karppinen (ex-HIM) – percussion on "My Prophecy"
- Eicca Toppinen (Apocalyptica) – cello on "Into Eternity"
- Paavo Lötjönen (Apocalyptica) – cello on "Into Eternity"
- Perttu Kivilaakso (Apocalyptica) – cello on "Into Eternity"

=== Production ===
- Joonas Parkkonen – producer, recording, mixing
- Svante Forsbäck – mastering
- Metastazis – cover art
- Sam Jamsen – photography
