= Fast Loud Death =

Studio album by Lost Society
- Released: March 15, 2013
- Genre: Thrash metal, speed metal
- Length: 35:48
- Label: Nuclear Blast
- Producer: Nino Laurenne

Lost Society chronology
Fast Loud Death (2013)	Terror Hungry (2014)

Professional ratings
Review scores
Source	Rating
All About the Rock	7.5/10
Imperiumi	8/10
Kaaoszine	10/10
Metal Forces	6.5/10
Soundi	4/5

Fast Loud Death is the debut studio album by Finnish metal band Lost Society, released on March 15, 2013. The album debuted at number 25 on the Finnish official album chart.

== Track listing ==
Terror Hungry track listing
No.	Title	Length
1.	"N.W.L."	2:23
2.	"Trash All Over You"	3:41
3.	"E.A.G."	2:20
4.	"Kill (Those Who Oppose Me)"	2:18
5.	"Bitch, Out' My Way"	4:01
6.	"Fast Loud Death"	3:26
7.	"Lead Through the Head"	3:14
8.	"Diary of a Thrashman"	2:43
9.	"Toxic Avenger"	1:08
10.	"This Is Me"	2:44
11.	"Braindead Metalhead"	3:27
12.	"Piss Out My Ass"	2:01
13.	"Fatal Anoxia"	2:27
14.	"Escape from Delirium" (special edition bonus track)	4:08
15.	"I Stole Your Love" (Kiss cover) (special edition bonus track)	3:24
Total length:		43:25

== Personnel ==
- Samy Elbanna – vocals, guitar
- Arttu Lesonen – guitar
- Mirko Lehtinen – bass
- Ossi Paananen – drums

=== Production ===
- Nino Laurenne – producer, recording, mixing
- Ed Repka – cover art
