= Nocturnes (Angellore album) =

Studio album by Angellore
- Released: 15 May 2026
- Recorded: October 2021 – February 2022
- Genres: Gothic metal, doom metal
- Length: 55:12
- Label: Ardua Music
- Producer: Déhà

Angellore chronology
Rien Ne Devait Mourir (2020)	Nocturnes (2026)

Singles from Nocturnes
- 1. "Black Sun River" Released: 4 April 2026; 2. "Falling Birds" Released: 3 May 2026

Professional ratings
Review scores
Source	Rating
The Dark Melody	8.5/10
Metal Eclipse Reviews	3.7/5

Nocturnes is the fourth full-length album by the French doom metal/gothic metal band Angellore, released on 15 May 2026 via Ardua Music. The album was written as early as 2010 during the Errances sessions, and demo sessions began in February 2017.

== Track listing ==
No.	Title	Length
1.	"Falling Birds"	11:07
2.	"Black Sun River"	7:58
3.	"Forsaken Fairytale"	11:03
4.	"Martyrium"	12:20
5.	"A Dormant Stream"	12:44
Total length:		55:12

== Personnel ==
- Rosarius – lead vocals, guitars, keyboards
- Walran – lead vocals
- Lucia – female vocals
- Celin – bass, guitars, backing vocals
- Ronnie – drums, percussion
