= Hell Is a State of Mind =

Studio album by Lost Society
- Released: 6 March 2026
- Recorded: May 20, 2025
- Genres: Nu metal, metalcore, groove metal
- Length: 38:07
- Label: Nuclear Blast
- Producer: Joonas Parkkonen

Lost Society chronology
If the Sky Came Down (2022)	Hell Is a State of Mind (2026)

Singles from Hell Is a State of Mind
- 1. "Dead People Scare Me (But the Living Make Me Sick)" Released: 20 May 2025; 2. "Blood Diamond" Released: 15 January 2026; 3. "Is This What You Wanted" Released: 11 February 2026

Hell Is a State of Mind is the sixth studio album by Finnish metal band Lost Society, released on 6 March 2026, through Nuclear Blast. It spawned several singles including "Blood Diamond" and "Is This What You Wanted". While continuing to build on the nu metal, metalcore, and groove metal sound of their previous two albums, the band also added more prominent symphonic elements.

== Track listing ==
All lyrics are written by Samy Elbanna; all music is composed by Elbanna and Joonas Parkkonen.

1. "Afterlife" – 3:10
2. "Blood Diamond" – 3:40
3. "Synthetic" – 3:39
4. "Is This What You Wanted" – 3:29
5. "L'appel du vide" – 4:12
6. "Kill the Light" – 4:47
7. "No Longer Human" – 3:23
8. "Dead People Scare Me (But the Living Make Me Sick)" – 3:28
9. "Personal Judas" – 3:30
10. "Hell Is a State of Mind" – 4:49

== Personnel ==
Credits adapted from Tidal.

=== Lost Society ===
- Samy Elbanna – vocals, guitar
- Arttu Lesonen – guitar
- Mirko Lehtinen – bass
- Tapani "Taz" Fagerström – drums

=== Additional contributor ===
- Joonas Parkkonen – production
