= An Unnameable Desire =

Studio album by Plini
- Released: 24 April 2026
- Recorded: 2024–2025
- Genres: Progressive metal; progressive rock; instrumental rock
- Length: 41:38
- Label: Self-released
- Producer: Plini

Plini chronology
Impulse Voices (2020)	An Unnameable Desire (2026)

Singles from An Unnameable Desire
- 1. "An Unnameable Desire" Released: 31 March 2026; 2. "Manala" Released: 10 April 2026; 3. "After Everything" Released: 17 April 2026

An Unnameable Desire is the third studio album by Australian guitarist Plini, released on 24 April 2026. A music video was released for the title track "An Unnameable Desire". Music videos for the other two singles "Manala" and "After Everything" were released subsequently.

Other members participating in the album include Chris Allison on drums, Simon Grove on bass, Dave Mackay on piano and synthesizer, John Waugh on saxophone and flutes, A.J. Minette on string arrangements, Misha Vayman on violin, Yoshi Masuda on cello, Emily Hopkins on harp, and Jakub Zytecki on guest guitars, with mastering by Adam "Nolly" Getgood of Periphery and additional production by Devesh Dayal of Skyharbor.

Plini has embarked on an April/May 2026 tour with Sungazer through Europe and the United Kingdom to promote the album, followed by a July/August 2026 Tour of Asia, India, Australia and New Zealand. A October/November 2026 North American Tour with Night Verses and Potraits is in progress. A playthrough video of "Vespertine" was released on YouTube after the release of the album.

== Track listing ==
All music is composed by Plini.

No.	Title	.	Length
1.	"Dorénavant"		0:53
2.	"An Unnameable Desire"		4:25
3.	"Ciel"	ft. Jakub Zytecki	3:08
4.	"Canyon"		2:54
5.	"Now & Then"		4:36
6.	"Manala"		4:37
7.	"Vespertine"		4:57
8.	"Ruin"		4:09
9.	"After Everything"		5:03
10.	"The Time Will Pass Anyway"		6:56
Total length:			41:38

== Personnel ==
=== Musicians ===
- Plini – guitars
- Simon Grove – bass
- Chris Allison – drums, percussion

=== Additional Musicians and Production ===
- Dave Mackay – piano, keyboards & synthesizers (tracks 2, 5-10)
- John Waugh – saxophone (tracks 2), flutes (track 9)
- A.J. Minette – string arrangement & production (tracks 2, 6, 7, 9, 10)
- Misha Vayman – violin (tracks 2, 6, 7, 9, 10)
- Yoshi Masuda – violin (tracks 2, 6, 7, 9, 10)
- Devesh Dayal – additional production (track 3)
- Jakub Zytecki – guitar solo (track 3. "Ciel")
- Emily Hopkins – Harp (track 9)
- Plini – mixing, engineering & production
- Simon Grove – auxiliary guitar, mixing, engineering & co-production
- Chris Allison – additional drum engineering & co-production
- Adam Getgood – mastering
