= Our Survival Depends on Us =

Austrian post-metal band

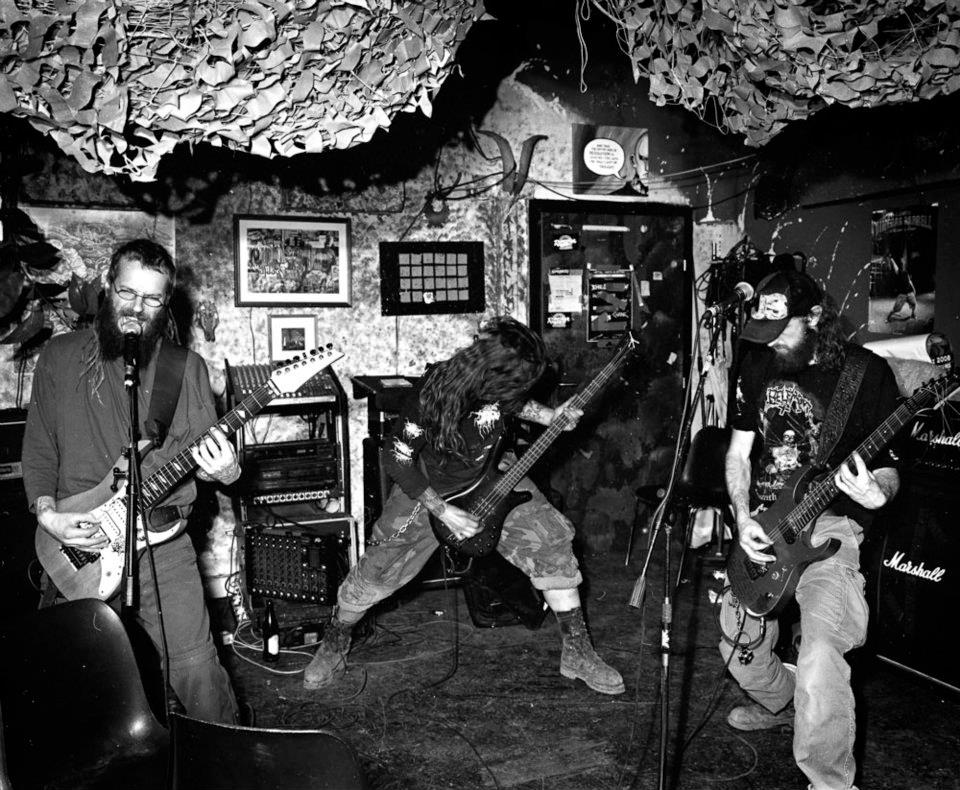
- Our Survival Depends on Us; Practice space 2005

Background information
- Origin: Salzburg, Austria
- Genres: Post-metal
- Years active: 1999–present
- Label: Ván Records
- Members: Mucho Kolb; Hajot Gmeilbauer; Thomas Apfelthaler; Reiner Maislinger; Klaus Buchebner
- Past members: Mani Eibner; Thom Kinberger; Barth Resch
- Website: www.osdou.com

Our Survival Depends on Us is a post-metal / doom / sludge band from Salzburg, Austria.

The band was founded in 1999 by Mucho Kolb and Mani Eibner and released the first demo recording Breathe in 2000. After this release Thom Kinberger and Hajot Gmeilbauer (also: Thelema, Sturmpercht) joined OSDOU who had both already played with Kolb in Soulsearch. The band had multiple short time bassists until Barth Resch (formerly: Belphegor) took over permanently before recording their second album. In 2014 founding member Eibner left OSDOU and the band recruited Thomas Apfelthaler as the new drummer. OSDOU are currently part of the Ván Records' roster.

== Members ==
Current members

- Mucho Kolb (Vocals, Guitar)
- Hajot Gmeilbauer (Keyboards)
- Thomas Apfelthaler (Drums)
- Reiner Maislinger (Vocals, Guitar)
- Klaus Buchebner (Bass)

Former members

- Mani Eibner (Drums, 1999–2014)
- Thom Kinberger (Vocals, Guitar)
- Barth Resch (Vocals, Bass)

== Discography ==
=== Studio albums ===
- 2005: Jumping Once Too Often into the Ocean That Had Always Been Our Inspiration (LP, Mju.org Records)
- 2007: Jumping Once Too Often into the Ocean That Had Always Been Our Inspiration (CD-reissue, Womb of Narcotics Records)
- 2009: Painful Stories Told with a Passion for Life (CD: Psychedoomelic Records, Vinyl: Totem-Records)
- 2015: Scouts on the Borderline Between the Physical and Spiritual World (Ván Records)
- 2019: Melting the Ice in the Hearts of Men (Ván Records)

=== Other ===
- 2000: Breathe (Demo)
- 2009: Der Blutharsch vs. Our Survival Depends on Us – Untitled (7" Single, WKN Records)
