= Where the Light Leaves =

Studio album by Varials
- Released: February 27, 2026
- Recorded: 2025
- Genres: beatdown hardcore; nu metal; metalcore
- Length: 37:07
- Label: Fearless
- Producer: Josh Schroeder

Varials chronology
Scars for You to Remember (2022)	Where the Light Leaves (2026)

Professional ratings
Review scores
Source	Rating
Boolin Tunes	9/10
Distorted Sound	8/10
Kerrang!	4/5
New Noise Magazine	3.75/5
Noizze	7/10

Where The Light Leaves is the fourth studio album by the American metalcore band Varials. It was released on February 27, 2026, through Fearless Records. It is their first release to feature rhythm guitarist Shane Lyons on lead guitar since their earlier EPs, the first with their new vocalist Skyler Conder, replacing Mitchell Rogers who left the band on October 27, 2024, and the first release without founding guitarist James Hohenwarter. The band released a music video for "I'll Find the Dark" on September 19, 2025. The song features the use of a wah-wah pedal which, according to Lyons, "is underutilized in our genre".

== Track listing ==
All tracks are written by Varials.

Where the Light Leaves track listing
No.	Title	Length
1.	"Where the Light Leaves"	1:58
2.	"No Lie Untouched"	3:37
3.	"Illusions of Loss"	2:29
4.	"Conscious Collapse"	2:30
5.	"Your Soul Feeds"	3:04
6.	"The Hurt Chamber"	3:18
7.	"Wouldyoufollowme"	1:56
8.	"Silent Demise"	2:55
9.	"Blissful End"	3:23
10.	"Romance II"	3:41
11.	"Metanoia"	3:23
12.	"I'll Find the Dark"	3:52
13.	"Intothequiet"	1:01
Total length:		37:07

=== Note ===
- "Wouldyoufollowme" and "Intothequiet" are stylized "[wouldyoufollowme]" and "[intothequiet]", respectively.

== Personnel ==
Credits are adapted from the album's liner notes.

=== Varials ===
- Mike Foley – bass, art direction, cover design, photography
- Shane Lyons – guitar, vocals
- Sean Rauchut – drums
- Skyler Conder – vocals

=== Additional contributors ===
- Josh Schroeder – production, mixing, mastering
- Sergei Sabrin – additional production on "The Hurt Chamber"
- Nick Castagna – art direction, cover design, photography
