= Plini =

Australian guitarist (born 1992)

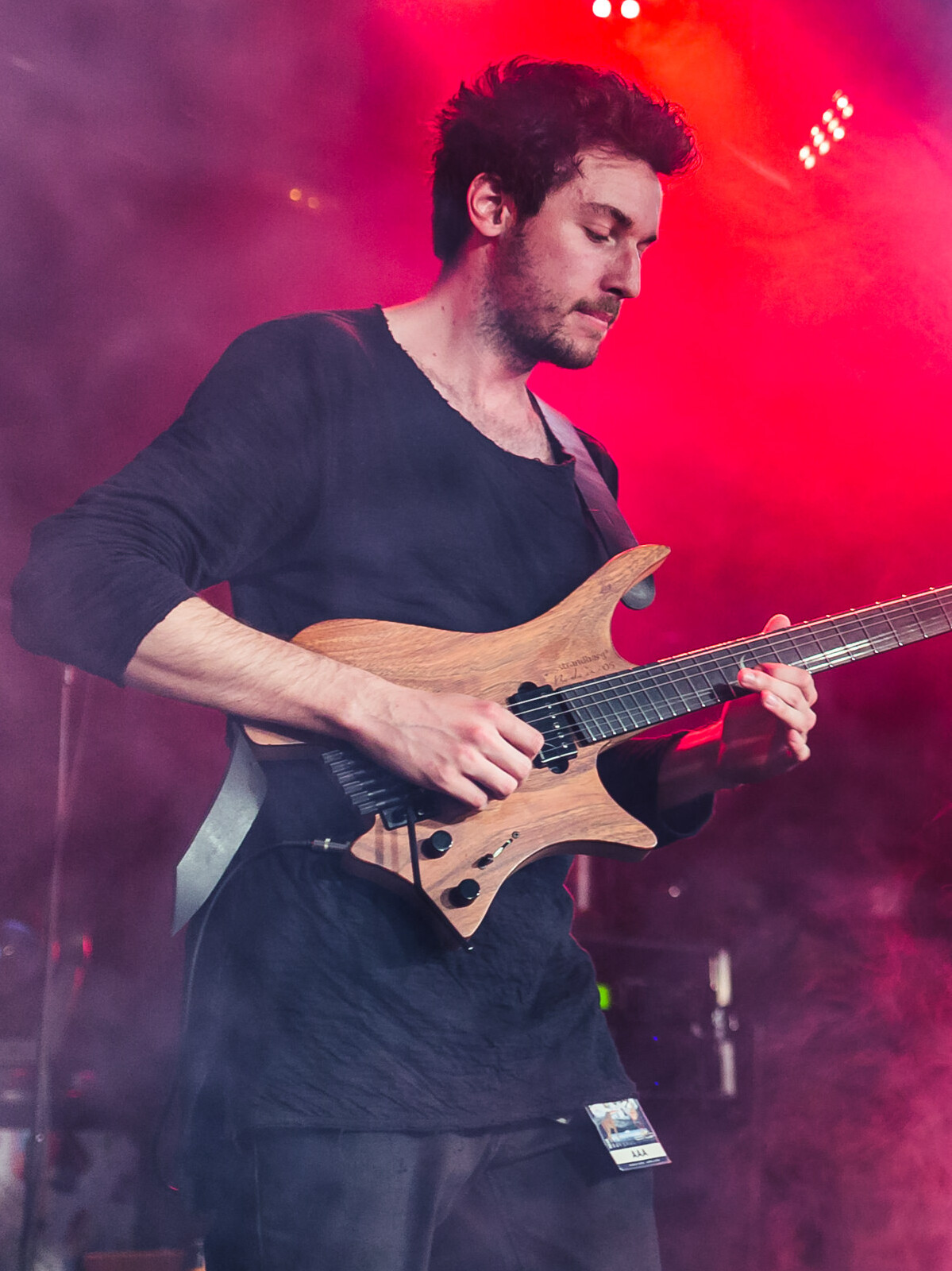
- Plini performing in 2017

Background information
- Also known as: Halcyon
- Born: 25 July 1992 (age 34); Sydney, New South Wales, Australia
- Genres: Instrumental rock; progressive rock; progressive metal; djent; math rock; post-rock; jazz fusion
- Years active: 2011–present
- Website: plini.co

Plini Roessler-Holgate (born 1992), known mononymously as Plini, is an Australian guitarist and songwriter. He began his career by releasing music under the name Halcyon, before switching to the use of his first name. Steve Vai described him as "the future of exceptional guitar playing", and the website MusicRadar named Plini the best prog guitarist of 2017.

Plini has released a trilogy of extended plays (Other Things and Sweet Nothings in 2013, The End of Everything in 2015). His debut album, Handmade Cities, which Vai described as "one of the finest, forward-thinking, melodic, rhythmically and harmonically deep instrumental guitar records [he has] ever heard", was released in 2016. Sunhead, an EP, was released in 2018, followed by his second full-length album, Impulse Voices, in 2020, and his third, An Unnameable Desire, in 2026.

== Influences ==
One of Plini's influences has been Joe Satriani. Plini stated in an interview, "What I found different in Joe's playing is his ability to craft simple and catchy melodies and phrase them so perfectly that he doesn't have to rely on (but can still bust out) flashy passages and cool tricks to keep the instrumental song format interesting. I hope we get to jam some day!" In another interview, Plini stated that Satriani has "been hugely inspirational to me so it's very cool when I'm told people can hear that in there."

== Doja Cat controversy ==
Doja Cat's 2020 performance of "Say So" at the MTV Europe Music Awards ceremony was criticized when some viewers noted that the guitar solo in the performance was identical to the one in Plini's 2016 song "Handmade Cities". The next month, Plini reported that Doja Cat left him an apologetic message through social media.

== Discography ==
=== Studio albums ===
- Handmade Cities (2016)
- Impulse Voices (2020)
- An Unnameable Desire (2026)

=== EPs ===
- Pastures (as Halcyon) (2011)
- Other Things (2013)
- Sweet Nothings (2013)
- I (split EP with Sithu Aye) (2013)
- The End of Everything (2015)
- Sunhead (2018)
- Impulse Voices (Remix EP) (2021)
- Mirage (2023)

=== Singles ===
- "Moonflower" (2012)
- "1745 7381 3265 2578" (2013)
- "Cloudburst" (2013)
- "Atlas" (2014)
- "Ko Ki" (2014)
- "Every Piece Matters" (2016)
- "Salt + Charcoal" (2018)
- "Birds / Surfers" (2020)
- "I'll Tell You Someday" (2020)
- "Papelillo" (2020)
- "Mind/Hive" (2022)
- "11 Nights" (2023)
- "Ember" (2023)
- "Still Life" (2023)
- "Ghost Train" (2024)
- "Dog Days" (2024)
- "hägring" (2025)
- "Helmi" (2026)
- "An Unnameable Desire" (2026)

=== Live albums ===
- Finnvox Sessions (2023)
- Live in North America (2025)

=== Contributions ===
- "Aurora Borealis" Aurora Borealis (Widek, 2012) featured as Halcyon, later changed to feat. Sithu Aye & Plini
- "The Argument of Periapsis" Abstraction (Cloudyhead, 2012)
- "Particles Collide" Invent the Universe (Sithu Aye, 2012)
- "Pulse, Pt. 1" Pulse (Sithu Aye, 2014)
- "Sailing Stone" Meridian (The Helix Nebula, 2014)
- "Ode to the Vulture" The Sapling (Trees on Mars, 2014)
- "The Constant" Guiding Light (Skyharbor, 2014)
- "Matrisphere" Samsara (Wide Eyes, 2014)
- "Run" Wishful Lotus Proof (Jakub Zytecki, 2015)
- "Earthshine" Journey to the Stars (Widek, 2015)
- "Water Drops" The Ocean Atlas (Modern Day Babylon, 2015)
- "Stardust" Eco (David Maxim Micic, 2015)
- "5:12 AM" Souvenirs (Novelists, 2015)
- "Libra" The Shape of Colour (Intervals, 2015)
- "Decimator" Tearing Back the Veil I: Ascension (Lithium Dawn, 2015)
- "Deep Blue" Natural Evolution (Haamoja, 2015)
- "Malaise" (Oceill, 2016)
- "Spiral" Set Course for Andromeda (Sithu Aye, 2016)
- "Violet" Tiny, Little Light (Umi, 2016)
- "Sight Before the Sound" Tearing Back the Veil II: Awakening (Lithium Dawn, 2017)
- "New Pyramids" The Impressionist (Hedras, 2017)
- "Asilon" Honest Oblivion (Scoredatura, 2018)
- "Blue Angel" (Adam "Nolly" Getgood of Periphery, 2019)
- "Wounded Wings" Ruins (Daniel Tompkins of Tesseract, 2020)
- "I Stand Alone" The Ritual (King Mothership, 2020)
- "Planet Geisha I (Remix)" Sacred Geometry 2020 (Cartoon Theory, 2020)
- "Push" Push (Mike Dawes, 2021)
- "Immaterial" Electricity Downtown (V I C E S, 2021)
- "Bergamot" (Connor Kaminski, 2022)
- "Sunset" (Tim Henson & Cory Wong, 2022)
- "Ultima" Elysian (Evan Marien, 2022)
- "It Starts with You" Carmine (Running Touch, 2022)
- "Giving 6" (Plini & Rabea, 2023)
- "Malaise" Malaise (Oceill, 2023)
- "A New Infinite (feat. Simon Grove)" (Aurora Dream & Plini, 2023)
- "Lovecraft" The Oak & the Secret (Alon Tamir, 2023)
- "Out of the Void" (Plini & Kiko Loureiro, 2024)
- "sugarfish" (Plini & Mateus Asato, 2024)
- "Whalefall" (Sungazer & Plini), 2024
- "In Captivity" (Plini & Tosin Abasi), 2025

== National Live Music Awards ==
The National Live Music Awards (NLMAs) are a broad recognition of Australia's diverse live industry, celebrating the success of the Australian live scene. The awards commenced in 2016.

Year	Nominee / work	Award	Result
National Live Music Awards of 2018	Plini	Live Guitarist of the Year	Nominated
