= Angellore =

French band

- Origin: France
- Genres: Death/doom, gothic metal, doom metal
- Years active: 2007-present
- Label: Shunu Records
- Members: Rosarius; Walran; Ronnie; Celin; Lucia

Angellore is a French doom metal/gothic metal band. The name of the band comes from the title of the Tristania song "Angellore".

== Biography ==
Rosarius and Walran first met through the internet in March 2007. In July 2007, during the Festival d'Avignon, they formed Angellore. Their first demo, Ambrosia, was written and recorded August 2007. Rosarius played the guitars and some of the keyboards and vocals, while Walran played the other half and imposed himself as a producer. Three songs were written in two days and put on MySpace. Through grabbing the attention of the Portuguese musician Marcos Marado, the band were part of a split CD with music project Merankorii, released in February 2009.

In the meantime, Angellore composed two more EPs, Les Promesses de l’Aube and Elégies aux Ames Perdues. In late 2009, drummer Ronnie, an old friend of Walran, joined the band, and later, in December 2009, the band entered the Studio AV to start recording their debut album. Errances was released in 2012 as a digital version and in 2013 as audio CD, earning good reviews.

In 2015 the band signs with Shunu Records, releasing the new album La Litanie des Cendres on August 21.

In July 2016, Angellore entered studio to record a new album. This third album, untitled "Rien Ne Devait Mourir" ("Nothing Had to Die"). has been released by Shunu Records and Finisterian Dead End and on vinyl via The Vinyl Division in February 2020.

== Musical style and influences ==
Angellore plays slow but melodic death/doom, combined with gothic metal and doom metal. They are influenced by numerous albums from bands like Saturnus, Draconian, While Heaven Wept, Shape of Despair, My Dying Bride, Warning, Candlemass, The Gathering, and Tiamat.

== Discography ==
=== Demos ===
- Ambrosia (2007)

=== Albums ===
- Errances (2012)
- La Litanie des Cendres (2015)
- Rien Ne Devait Mourir (2020)
- Nocturnes (2026)

=== Compilation albums ===
- Premiéres Liturgies - Soupirs d'Aurore (2012)

=== EPs and splits ===
- Les Promesses de l’Aube (2008)
- Merankorii / Angellore (2009)
- Elégies aux Ames Perdues (2009)

== Band members ==
- Rosarius - guitars, bass, keyboards, vocals (2007-present)
- Walran - keyboards, vocals (2007-present)
- Ronnie - drums (2009-present)
- Celin - bass (2016-present)
- Lucia - female vocals (2016-present)
