= The Last Ten Seconds of Life =

American deathcore band

- Origin: Mansfield, Pennsylvania, U.S.
- Genres: Deathcore, beatdown hardcore, brutal death metal
- Years active: 2010–present
- Labels: Metal Blade, Density, Unique Leader
- Members: Wyatt McLaughlin; Tyler Beam; Andrew Petway; Dylan Potts
- Past members: Christian Fisher; Storm Strope; Casey Quick; Thomas Giamanco; Anthony Madara; John Robert Centorrino; Mike Menocker; David Boughter; Steven Sanchez

The Last Ten Seconds of Life is an American deathcore band from Mansfield, Pennsylvania, formed in 2010.

== History ==
The original lineup featured Storm Strope on vocals, Wyatt McLaughlin and Casey Quick on guitars, Thomas Giamanco on bass, and Christian Fisher on drums.

Despite the group's heavy sound, The Last Ten Seconds of Life borrowed their name from a lyric from the Smiths song "Stop Me If You Think You've Heard This One Before". Within a year of forming, they were touring regularly and had self-released their debut album, Know Your Exits. TLTSOL toured hard in support of the album, and by 2013 they had a new lineup: Quick was out, with McLaughlin handling all the guitar duties, and bassist Giamanco left, with Anthony Madara taking over the low end.

The independent metal label Density Records signed TLTSOL, and their second album, Invivo[Exvivo], was released on January 20, 2014.

As before, the group promoted the album through plenty of live work, and toured with other metal acts such as I Declare War, Fit for an Autopsy, Thy Art Is Murder, and Kublai Khan.

In 2014, the band returned to Atrium Audio in Lancaster, Pennsylvania—where Invivo[Exvivo] was created—to begin work on their next album. When TLTSOL's third album, Soulless Hymns, arrived in January 2015, it quickly became the group's biggest success to date, debuting at number 22 on Billboard's Hard Rock Albums charts and number 14 on the Heatseekers Chart.

In October 2015, TLTSOL announced that Storm Strope had left the band, and John Robert Centorrino, who had previously sung with My Bitter End, had been recruited to fill in for him during a concert tour later in the year. The band revealed that Centorrino had officially signed on as their new singer in May 2016, and a few months later, they returned to the studio to work on their next album.

The Violent Sound was released in November 2016, and like its predecessor, it immediately jumped into the Heatseekers Chart at number 14.

January 11, 2019 saw the release of the group's fifth studio album, Machina Non Grata. On October 5, 2021, the band announced they would release their self-titled sixth studio album on January 28, 2022.

On March 1, 2022, vocalist John Robert Centorrino, bassist Mike Menocker, and drummer Steven Sanchez departed the band without explanation. On August 29, a new lineup of the band was revealed, with Tyler Beam, Andrew Petway and Dylan Potts joining as vocalist, bassist and drummer, respectively. On October 26, the band released a new song and video for "Annihilation Phenomena", which was featured on their EP, Disquisition on an Execution that was released on November 25.

== Band members ==
=== Current ===
- Wyatt McLaughlin – guitars (2010–present)
- Tyler Beam – vocals (2022–present)
- Andrew Petway – bass (2022–present)
- Dylan Potts – drums (2022–present)

=== Former ===
- Christian Fisher – drums (2010–2018)
- Storm Strope – vocals (2010–2015)
- Casey Quick – guitars (2010–2013)
- Thomas Giamanco – bass (2010–2013)
- Anthony Madara – bass (2013–2015)
- John Robert Centorrino – vocals (2015–2022)
- Mike Menocker – bass (2015–2022)
- David Boughter – drums (2018–2019)
- Steven Sanchez – drums (2019–2022)

== Discography ==
=== Studio albums ===
Year	Details	Peak chart positions	
Year	Details	US Hard Rock	US Heat
2011	Know Your Exits: Release: October 25, 2011; Label: N/A; Format: Music download	—	—
2014	Invivo (Exvivo): Release: January 20, 2014; Label: Density Records, Workhorse Records; Format: CD, download	—	—
2015	Soulless Hymns: Release: January 13, 2015; Label: Density Records, Workhorse Records; Format: CD, download	22	14
2016	The Violent Sound: Release: October 21, 2016; Label: Siege Music; Format: CD, download	—	14
2019	Machina Non Grata: Release: January 11, 2019; Label: N/A; Format: CD, download	—	—
2022	The Last Ten Seconds of Life: Release: January 28, 2022; Label: Unique Leader; Format: CD, download	—	—
2024	No Name Graves: Release: February 9, 2024; Label: Unique Leader; Format: CD, download	—	—
2026	The Dead Ones: Release: April 17, 2026; Label: Metal Blade; Format: CD, download	—	—

=== EPs ===
- Justice (2010)
- Warpath (2012)
- Disquisition on an Execution (2022)

=== Compilations ===
- The Last Ten Seconds of Life: 2010–2012 (2014, Density Records, Workhorse Records)

=== Singles ===
- "The Impossible Product" (2018)
- "Cold Concrete" w/ Extortionist (2024)
