= Lost Society =

Finnish metal band

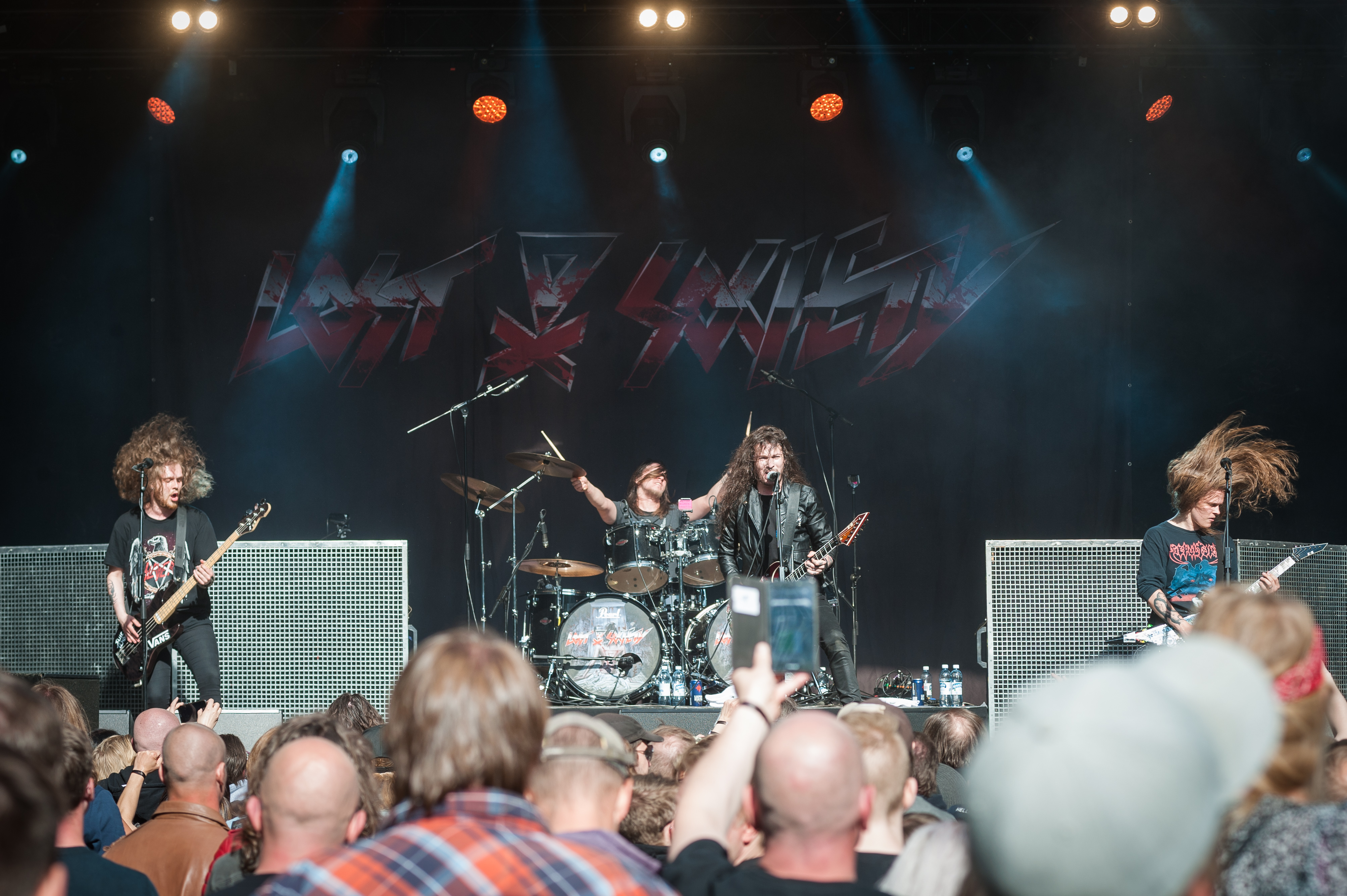
- Lost Society at the 2018 South Park Festival in Tampere, Finland

Background information
- Origin: Jyväskylä, Finland
- Genres: Metalcore, nu metal, groove metal, thrash metal (early)
- Years active: 2010–present
- Label: Nuclear Blast
- Members: Samy Elbanna; Arttu Lesonen; Mirko Lehtinen; Taz Fagerström
- Past members: Ossi Paananen
- Website: lostsociety.fi

Lost Society is a Finnish metal band formed in Jyväskylä in 2010. The lineup consists of guitarist/vocalist Samy Elbanna, guitarist Arttu Lesonen, bassist Mirko Lehtinen, and drummer Taz Fagerström.

== History ==
The band participated in the 2012 GBOB (Global Battle of the Bands) organized by Nuclear Blast, winning as the Finnish qualifier, and went to London to perform in the finals. In 2013, they released their debut album, Fast Loud Death, and received a positive response from the Finnish media. The band toured with Children of Bodom in late 2013.

In April 2014, the band released their second studio album, Terror Hungry, which charted at number 6 on the official Finnish charts (Suomen virallinen lista). In February 2016, the band released their third album, Braindead, which rose to number 3 on the official chart.

The band appeared at the Hartwall Arena on December 7, 2015, alongside Slayer and Anthrax. In early 2016, they toured with American thrash metal band Exodus in England, Ireland, Germany, and the Netherlands.

On February 19, 2020, two days before releasing their fourth album, Ossi Paananen stepped down and was replaced with former Santa Cruz drummer Taz Fagerström. Their fourth album, No Absolution, was released on February 21, 2020. On March 3, 2020, the album reached the Finnish charts landing at number 4.

On October 7, 2022, the band released their fifth album, If the Sky Came Down. That year, Lost Society and Blind Channel toured Europe on the Sick & Dangerous tour, which ran from late August to early October. The tour stopped in Germany, the UK, France, Spain, Poland, and other European countries. In 2023, the band headlined their first European tour, the If the Sky Came Down tour, visiting Germany, the Netherlands, Switzerland, and the Czech Republic.

The band released their sixth album, Hell Is A State of Mind, on March 6, 2026. Later that month, they embarked on the Tour Is a State of Mind tour, visiting Germany, England, the Netherlands, Switzerland, Denmark, Norway, Sweden, and concluding in Finland.

== Musical style ==
In their first two albums, Fast Loud Death (2013) and Terror Hungry (2014), they delivered fast and raw thrash metal with aggressive and party-themed lyrics often revolving around alcohol consumption. Their style started to change in their third album, Braindead (2016). While Braindead is still considered a thrash metal album, the band started incorporating elements of groove metal and metalcore to their music and most of the lyrics started to shift to other topics rather than partying and binge drinking. This trend became more evident in their fourth album, No Absolution (2020), in which the band completely moved away from thrash metal. No Absolution can be classified as a blend of metalcore, death metal, groove metal, and nu metal. The lyrics in No Absolution focus on religion and its negative influence on people and society. Their fifth album If The Sky Came Down (2022) has shown the fans a more modern musical style. If the Sky Came Down is, similarly to No Absolution, a metalcore album mixed with nu metal and groove metal. The lyrics in their fifth album have angsty and existential dread themes. This stylistic direction would continue further in their next album Hell Is a State of Mind (2026), which also saw the band incorporate symphonic elements.

== Band members ==
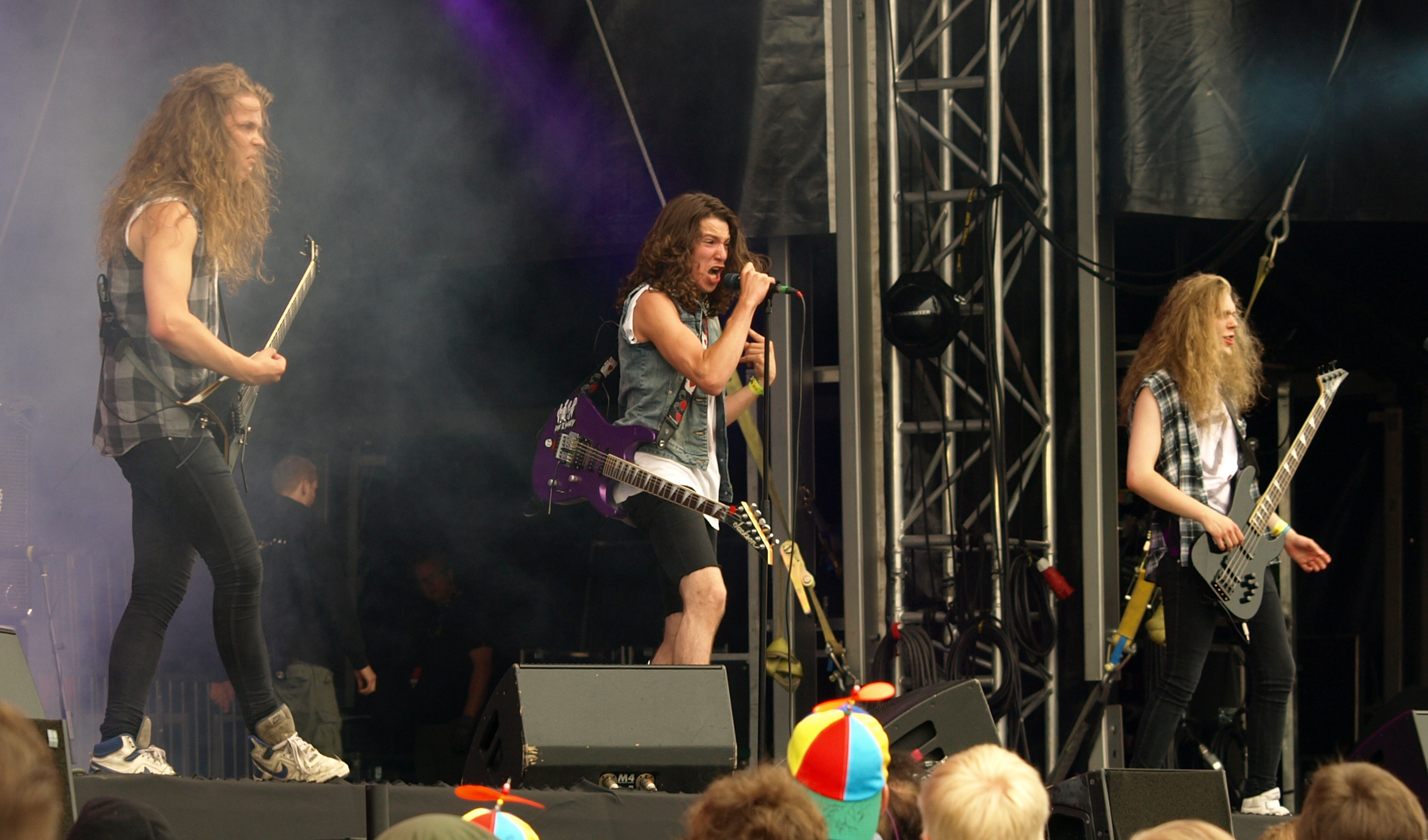
Lost Society performing in 2013

Current members

- Samy Elbanna – lead and rhythm guitars, lead vocals (2010–present)
- Arttu Lesonen – lead and rhythm guitars, backing vocals (2010–present)
- Mirko Lehtinen – bass guitar, backing vocals (2010–present)
- Taz Fagerström – drums (2020–present)

Past members

- Ossi Paananen – drums (2010–2020)

Other

- Joonas Parkkonen – producer and co-composer (2020-present)

== Discography ==
=== Studio albums ===
- Fast Loud Death (2013)
- Terror Hungry (2014)
- Braindead (2016)
- No Absolution (2020)
- If the Sky Came Down (2022)
- Hell Is a State of Mind (2026)

=== Singles ===
- "Trash All Over You" (2013)
- "I Am the Antidote" (2015)
- "No Absolution" (2019)
- "Deliver Me" (2019)
- "Into Eternity" (2019)
- "Artificial" (2020)
- "112" (2022)
- "Stitches" (2022)
- "What Have I Done" (2022)
- "Awake" (2022)
- "Dead People Scare Me (But the Living Make Me Sick)" (2025)

=== Demos ===
- Lost Society (2011)
- Trash All Over You (2013)
