= Brotality =

American metal band

- Origin: Narrowsburg, New York, U.S.
- Genres: Groove metal; thrash metal
- Years active: 2016–present
- Label: Rottweiler
- Members: Bryce Maopolski; Reece Maopolski; John Haring
- Past members: Liam Fenton
- Website: brotalityband.com

Brotality is an American thrash and groove metal band that originated in Narrowsburg, New York. The band began in 2016 with brothers Bryce (guitars/vocals) and Reece Maopolski (bass/vocals).

== History ==
Brotality began in 2016 with brothers Bryce and Reece Maopolski, who performed guitars and bass, respectively, with both handling vocals. The band, however, did not come to completion until the brothers met Liam Fenton in 2018, who would join the band on drums. With Fenton in the band, the three released their debut EP, titled Hypernova. However, this EP was recorded by Bryce, performing guitars, bass, and drums, with Reece and Liam not participating. Later that year, in September 2018, the band opened for both Deep Purple and Judas Priest. The following year, the band released "Painmonger", followed by their sophomore EP titled The Provocation in March 2019. The EP featured the whole band this time, a major departure from the djent sound of the first release. Bryce also mixed and mastered the release. In September 2019, the band released "Legions Fall", set to be their debut single off their upcoming album.

In March 2020, the band signed with Rottweiler Records, a label out of Fort Wayne, Indiana. Their signing also saw the release of their next single, "Salting the Wound". On June 26, 2020, the band debuted their lyric video for "Spiral Out", which would later release on July 3. The band also participated in a tribute show to Steve Rowe of Mortification, which was put on by Exodo Festival, covering the song "Gut Wrench" off of Primitive Rhythm Machine.

On October 16, 2020, the band released their second D45, Foxhole, which featured both "Foxhole" and "Dirtnap". On October 17, 2020, the band premiered their debut music video, "Foxhole". The band's debut album, Worldwide Desolation, was released on February 5, 2021, through Rottweiler to very positive reviews. On September 28, the band announced Liam Fenton's departure in pursuit of his personal life, playing his last show on October 3, 2021. With Fenton's departure, Tanner Snyder and Tyler Tompkins were called to fill-in until a replacement could be found. Snyder played a handful of shows, with Tompkins covering for five months until March 2, 2022, when John Haring was hired and announced as the newest member of the band.

== Members ==
Current

- Bryce Maopolski – guitars, vocals (2016–present), bass, drum programming (2018)
- Reece Maopolski – bass, vocals (2016–present)
- John Haring – drums (2022–present)

Former

- Liam Fenton – drums, backing vocals (2018–2021)

Live

- Tanner Snyder – drums (2021)
- Tyler Tompkins – drums (2021-2022)

Timeline

== Discography ==
Studio albums

- Worldwide Desolation (2021)
- The Woods Will End You (2022)
- Jaws of the Earth (2026)

EPs

- Hypernova (2018)
- The Provocation (2019)
- It Feeds (2024)

Singles

- "Painmonger" (2019)
- "Legion Falls" (2019)
- "Salting the Wound" (2020)
- "Spiral Out" (2020)
- "Foxhole" (2020)
- "Dirtnap" (2020)
- "Prisoners of the Abyss" (2020)
- "Nosedive" (2021)
- ”Frost Empire” (2022)
- ”An Evil Presence” (2022)
- ”Black Abandon” (2024)
- ”It Feeds” (2024)
- ”Cryptic Worship” (2024)
- ”The Bones of God” (2024)
- "Blasphemy" (2025)
- "The Body" (2025)
- "Keepsake" (2025)
- "Animalistic" (2026)
- "Wormsign" (2026)
