= Drown in Sulphur =

Italian band

- Origin: Arona, Italy
- Genres: Blackened deathcore, symphonic deathcore, blackened death metal
- Years active: 2014-present
- Labels: Scarlet, Noble Demon
- Members: Domenico Francesco Tamilia; Erik Bellan; Ciprian Grigore; Manuel Riboldi
- Past members: Mattia Rossi; Leonardo Sergio; Max Foti; Simone Verde; Mattia Maffioli; Enrico Masiero; Luca Pareschi; Emanuele Corso; Christian Lombardo

Drown in Sulphur is an Italian deathcore band, formed in 2014 by Domenico Francesco Tamilia. The band has released two EPs and three studio albums.

== History ==
Formed in 2014, Drown in Sulphur released two EPs. After drastically changing the lineup, Drown in Sulphur released its first full-length album, Sulphur Cvlt on 22 October 2021. The album received very good feedback, and it has spawned music videos for "Vivant Tenebrae", the title track, and "The Crawling Chaos".

The band's second album Dark Secrets of the Soul was released in January 2024, their first album with Scarlet Records. The album was produced by Filippo Rambelli and Alex Pedrotti. The album received many positive reviews. The band has released music videos for "Shadow of the Dark Throne", "Eclipse of the Sun of Eden", "Unholy Light", and "Lotus". The band promoted the album with some concerts including a show in Modena on 6 April, 2024, with The Burning Dogma.

The band released their third album Vengeance on 17 January 2025. Music videos were released for "Absentia", "Morningstar", and the title track. The band will release their new EP Strix on 11 September 2026, via Noble Demon Records.

== Musical style ==
Drown in Sulphur and its material have generally been described as deathcore, blackened deathcore, death metal, symphonic deathcore and blackened death metal.

== Members ==
Current members

- Domenico Francesco Tamilia - drums (2014–present)
- Erik Bellan - guitar, bass (2025-present)
- Ciprian Grigore - guitar (2026-present)
- Manuel Riboldi - vocals (2026-present)

Past members

- Mattia Rossi - bass (2014–2017)
- Leonardo Sergio - guitars (2014-2018, 2019)
- Max Foti – guitars (2019)
- Simone Verde - vocals, guitars (2014–2019)
- Mattia Maffioli - vocals (2014–2019)
- Enrico Masiero - bass (2017-2021)
- Luca Pareschi - vocals (2019-2021)
- Emanuele Corso - guitars (2019-2025)
- Christian Lombardo - guitars, vocals (2021-2025)
- Daniele Posillipo - guitars (2022-2025)

== Discography ==
=== Studio albums ===
- Sulphur Cvlt (2021)
- Dark Secrets of the Soul (2024)
- Vengeance (2025)

=== EPs ===
- It Rises (2015)
- Blackwind (2019)
- Strix (2026)

=== Singles ===
- "An Epilogue to the Arrogant" (2015)
- "Violet Shades of Kingu" (2016)
- "Blackwind" (2018)
- "Moths" (2019)
- "Brain Dead" (2020)
- "Earth Reset" (2020)
- "Descendent Sunrise" (2021)
- "Essence" (2021)
- "Vivant Tenebrae" (2021)
- "Sulphur Cvlt" (2021)
- "The Crawling Chaos" (2021)
- "Shadow of the Dark Throne" (2023)
- "Buried by Snow and Hail" (2023)
- "Absentia" (2024)
- "Morningstar" (2024)
- "Seed of Hate" (2025)
