= Varials =

American metalcore band

- Origin: Philadelphia, Pennsylvania, U.S.
- Genres: Metalcore; hardcore punk; nu metalcore
- Years active: 2013–present
- Label: Fearless
- Members: Mike Foley; Sean Rauchut; Shane Lyons; Skyler Conder
- Past members: Travis Tabron; Jared Pilieri; James Hohenwarter; Mitchell Rogers
- Website: varialspa.net

Varials is an American metalcore band from Philadelphia, Pennsylvania, formed in October 2013. The band currently consists of guitarist Shane Lyons, bassist Mike Foley, drummer Sean Rauchut, and vocalist Skyler Conder.

== History ==
The band members, all from Philadelphia or surrounding towns, had been a part of the 2009 music scene in one way or another, realizing this years later after they all met through different means. By 2012, they officially formed Varials. The original lineup consisted of vocalist Jared Pilieri, guitarists James Hohenwarter and Shane Lyons, bassist Mike Foley, and drummer Sean Rauchut. Pilieri was kicked out of the band in 2014, with the band releasing a statement distancing themselves from him, stating "(Pilieri) used his place in this band to manipulate others and we all sincerely apologize to anyone that was affected by his actions" He was replaced by Travis Tabron. Lyons left around 2017 and was replaced by former Capture the Crown guitarist Mitchell Rogers.

Varial's first release was the single "Trapped", released on October 7, 2013. They released an EP, Recollection in 2014. In 2016 they released a split EP, Absolution with Wilmington, Delaware-based band Vicious Embrace.

They signed with Fearless Records on July 6, 2017, and announced their debut album Pain Again, produced by Josh Schroeder, which was released on August 11. The lead single, "Anything to Numb" was released alongside a music video that day. The second single, "Pain Again" was released on July 28 with another music video. The song "E.D.A." had a music video released on August 10. The third single "Empire of Dirt"'s music video was released in May 2018.

Early on in 2017, the band toured with For the Fallen Dreams and Deadships. In mid-2017, the band toured alongside Wage War, Gideon, Oceans Ate Alaska and Loathe. They also toured with Kublai Khan and I Am. In 2018, they toured in support of Emmure alongside Counterparts and King 810 on the Natural Born Killers tour. In late-2018, they opened for Counterparts and Being as an Ocean, alongside Have Mercy on the Private Room Tour. Varials also got to play on the Atlantic City date for the 25th anniversary of the Vans Warped Tour. They were able to play both days of the festival due to technical issues they had on the first day of playing.

Varials has gained comparisons to Knocked Loose by the media, and Knocked Loose vocalist Bryan Garris guested on the Varials song "Empire of Dirt". Varials also toured with Knocked Loose in December 2015. They have also been likened to the hardcore band Jesus Piece, who also hail from Philadelphia, as both bands have been regarded as some of the brightest prospects in the genre.

The band released their second album, In Darkness, through Fearless on October 11, 2019. Varials supported Counterparts on their Private Room 2.0 Tour throughout the Fall of 2019. Varials will be heading to Europe to support Polaris on their Death of Me Tour. Varials is also set to support Spite on their Root of all Evil Tour.

On January 23, 2020, vocalist Travis Tabron announced his departure from the band. They will still continue to tour without Travis with Mitchell Rogers taking over lead vocals.

In late 2020 and early 2021, the band began working with producer Josh Schroeder on a new EP. They later decided to switch from an EP to their third studio album. On March 8, 2022, the band announced via their Instagram that they had finished work on the album. This also included the return of guitarist Shane Lyons. In August, the band announced their third album, Scars for You to Remember, would be released on October 14.

On September 19, 2025, the band released their new single, 'I'll Find the Dark'. This marks their debut with new vocalist Skyler Conder, who is also in Oklahoma heavy metalcore band CELL. He previously joined the band on recent tours as a fill-in vocalist for Mitchell Rogers, who also used to be on guitar, who now plays with Chiodos after quietly leaving the band.

== Influences ==
The band has listed many artists and genres as influences, such as the Acacia Strain, Molly Hatchet, Architects' Hollow Crown (2009), Bring Me the Horizon's Suicide Season (2008), Slipknot, Big L, nu metal music, and shoegaze music.

== Band members ==
=== Current ===
- Mike Foley – bass (2013–present)
- Sean Rauchut – drums (2013–present)
- Shane Lyons – rhythm guitar (2022–present), lead guitar (2013–2017, 2024–present), backing vocals (2025–present)
- Skyler Conder – lead vocals (2025–present)

=== Former ===
- Travis Tabron – lead vocals (2014–2020)
- Jared Pilieri – lead vocals (2013–2014)
- James Hohenwarter – lead guitar (2021–2024), rhythm guitar (2013–2022)
- Mitchell Rogers – lead vocals (2021–2024), lead guitar, backing vocals (2017–2021)

== Discography ==
Albums

- Pain Again (2017)
- In Darkness (2019)
- Scars for You to Remember (2022)
- Where the Light Leaves (2026)

EPs

- Recollection (2014)
- Failure//Control (2015)
- Absolution (Split EP with Vicious Embrace, 2016)
