= Iselder =

- Origin: Wales
- Genres: Black metal
- Years active: 2014–present
- Labels: Marwolaeth records, Ukem records
- Members: Gofid

Iselder (Welsh pronunciation: [iːs'ɛldɛr] meaning "depression" or "lowness") is a black metal solo project by Gofid (Welsh pronunciation: [g oː'vɪd] meaning "sorrow").

Iselder was formed in 2014 and self-describes as "Welsh nationalist black metal". Gofid cites bands such as Satanic Warmaster, Tsjuder, Leviathan, Nargaroth and Xasthur as influences on the musical style of Iselder. The songs of Iselder cover aspects of Welsh history and folk culture.

== Use of the Welsh language ==
Many of Iselder's song titles are in Welsh or contain some Welsh lyrics however Gofid is not a fluent Welsh speaker and many of the lyrics are in English. When younger, Gofid did not learn Welsh, believing the language to be close to dying and not viewing it important that the Welsh language thrived. However their view has now changed and they actively incorporate the Welsh language into their music where they can.

== Controversies ==
The release of the album "Welsh Nationalist Black Metal" in 2021 attracted controversy over its use of imagery. The decision to release 33 cassettes, the choice of white as a colour for the cassette and the use of the Eryr Wen were interpreted by some as sympathy with Nazi ideology. This was despite the j-card of this release including a quote saying “Being Welsh means belonging, feeling that we belong, whatever our language, colour or religion.”

The release of Iselder's second album, "Metal Du Gwir Cymreig", was initially planned for later that same year but was delayed when Gofid was arrested under suspicion of inciting arson and criminal damage. The investigation took five months during which time Gofid's phone, PC and all Iselder merchandise were seized, delaying release of the album.

The charges related to a parody t-shirt he created saying "Burn your local holiday home" which both referenced the arson attacks by Meibion Glyndŵr and "Burn your local church" t-shirts. The lyrics to Iselder's song "Llosgi Bwriadol" ( Welsh pronunciation: [ɬɔsgiː bwriːaːdɔl] meaning "arson"), which discusses the holiday home burnings in the 1980s and 1990s, also came under police scrutiny before all charges were dropped.

== Discography ==
Release date	Title	Format	Label
6 April 2017	Oer	Demo	Self-released
15 December 2017	Dechrau	Album	Self-produced
25 April 2018	Gwaglewch	EP	Self-released
10 July 2018	Yma o Hyd (cover)	Single	Self-released
17 November 2018	Annûn	Split album with Merciless Savage	Marwolaeth Records
1 March 2021	Welsh Nationalist Black Metal	EP	Marwolaeth Records
1 July 2021	Fe Godwn Ni Eto	EP	Marwolaeth Records
15 April 2022	Metel Du Gwir Cymreig	Album	Marwolaeth Records
15 July 2022	Shattered	EP	Marwolaeth Records
17 February 2023	Cynefin	Album	Ukem Records
15 September 2024	Gogoniant	Album	Marwolaeth Records
5 June 2026	The 36th Division	Album	Marwolaeth Records
