= Üga Büga =

American heavy metal band

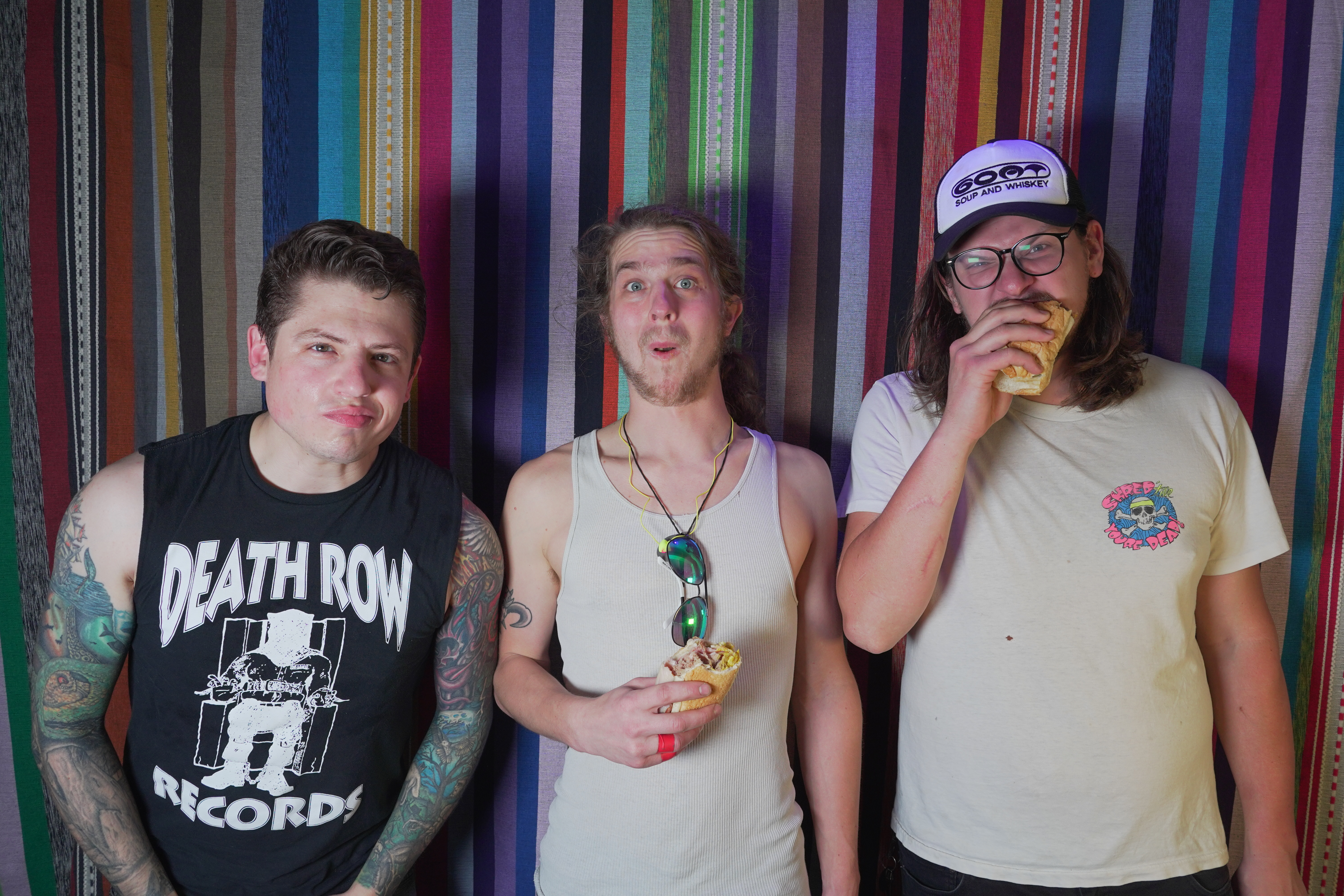
- Üga Büga in 2023. From left to right: Jimmy, Calloway, Niko.

Background information
- Origin: Charlottesville, Virginia
- Genres: Sludge metal; Stoner rock
- Years active: 2021-present
- Members: Calloway Jones; Niko Cvetanovich; Jimmy Czywczynski
- Website: ugabugaband.com

Üga Büga is a sludge metal and stoner rock music group started in 2021 and based in Charlottesville, Virginia.

== Style and influences ==
Üga Büga's artistic influences include the groups Mastodon, High on Fire, and Soundgarden, as well as art from fantasy and science fiction comics.

One reviewer described the band's music by saying that the vocals are more distinctive with less screaming as compared to some other heavy metal music. Another reviewer described their 2024 album, Year of the Hog, as "post-apocalyptic".

In 2024 they toured in their home region, Virginia.

== Members ==
The group was formed in 2021. They are based in Charlottesville, Virginia.

- Calloway Jones - guitar, lead vocals
- Niko Cvetanovich - bass, backing vocals
- Jimmy Czywczynski - Drums, backing vocals

== Discography ==
Studio albums

- Year of The Hog (2024)
- Valley of the Wolf (2026)
