= The Dead Ones =

Studio album by The Last Ten Seconds of Life
- Released: April 17, 2026
- Genre: Deathcore
- Length: 33:21
- Label: Metal Blade

The Last Ten Seconds of Life chronology
No Name Graves (2024)	The Dead Ones (2026)

Singles from The Dead Ones
- 1. "The Dead Ones" Released: January 16, 2026; 2. "Rat Trap" Released: April 20, 2026

Professional ratings
Review scores
Source	Rating
Boolin Tunes	7/10

The Dead Ones is the eighth studio album by American deathcore band The Last Ten Seconds of Life, released on April 23, 2026, via Metal Blade Records. The album features guest vocals by David Simonich (Signs of the Swarm), Nate Johnson (ex-Fit for an Autopsy), Alan Grnja (Distant), and former vocalist Storm Strope.

== Track listing ==
1. "The Dead Ones" – 3:32
2. "Make It to Heaven" (featuring David Simonich) – 3:45
3. "Rat Trap" (featuring Nate Johnson) – 3:32
4. "Freak Reflection" – 3:21
5. "1-800-DO YOU WANT TO DIE?" – 3:28
6. "Stiletto" – 2:30
7. "Stereo" – 3:36
8. "Dollar to a Dime" (featuring Alan Grnja) – 3:54
9. "Corruption Concerto" – 3:04
10. "XXXXXXXXXX" (featuring Storm Strope) – 2:39

== Personnel ==
- Tyler Beam – vocals
- Wyatt McLaughlin – guitars
- Andrew Petway – bass
- Dylan Potts – drums
