= Eternal Champion (band) =

- Origin: Austin, Texas, United States
- Genres: Heavy metal, thrash metal
- Years active: 2012–present
- Label: No Remorse Records

Eternal Champion is a heavy metal band from the United States. The band was founded in Austin, Texas, in 2012.

== History ==
Eternal Champion formed in 2012 and released their debut album The Armor of Ire in 2016. Fenriz of Darkthrone placed the album in second position in his top 15 albums released in 2016. Columnist Stefan Glass of the German magazine Rock Hard gave it a score of 8.5 out of 10.

The group visited Europe for the first time in spring 2017 when they were invited to the Keep It True festival. Manilla Road and Cirith Ungol, two musical influences of Eternal Champion were also present at this festival.

On May 29, 2024, Brad Raub, who was the band's bassist on their 2020 album Ravening Iron, died at the age of 36. No cause of death was revealed.

On March 12, 2026, the band released a new EP, Friend of War, and also announced their third full-length album would be released later in the year.

== Influences ==
The name comes from writer Michael Moorcock's Eternal Champion. Besides Moorcock, singer Jason Tarpey cites thematic influences of Robert E. Howard, Karl Edward Wagner and Howard Phillips Lovecraft. He mentions among others Klaus Meine, Mark Shelton of Manilla Road and Robert Lowe of Solitude Aeturnus among his influences as a singer.

== Discography ==
=== Studio albums ===
- The Armor of Ire (2016)
- Ravening Iron (2020)

=== EPs ===
- Retaliator / Vigilance (split with Canadian band Gatekeeper) (2015)
- Parallel of Death (2017)
- Terminus Est (2019)
- Friend of War (2026)

=== Demo albums ===
- The Last King of Pictdom (2013)
