= Evil Invaders (band) =

Belgian thrash metal band

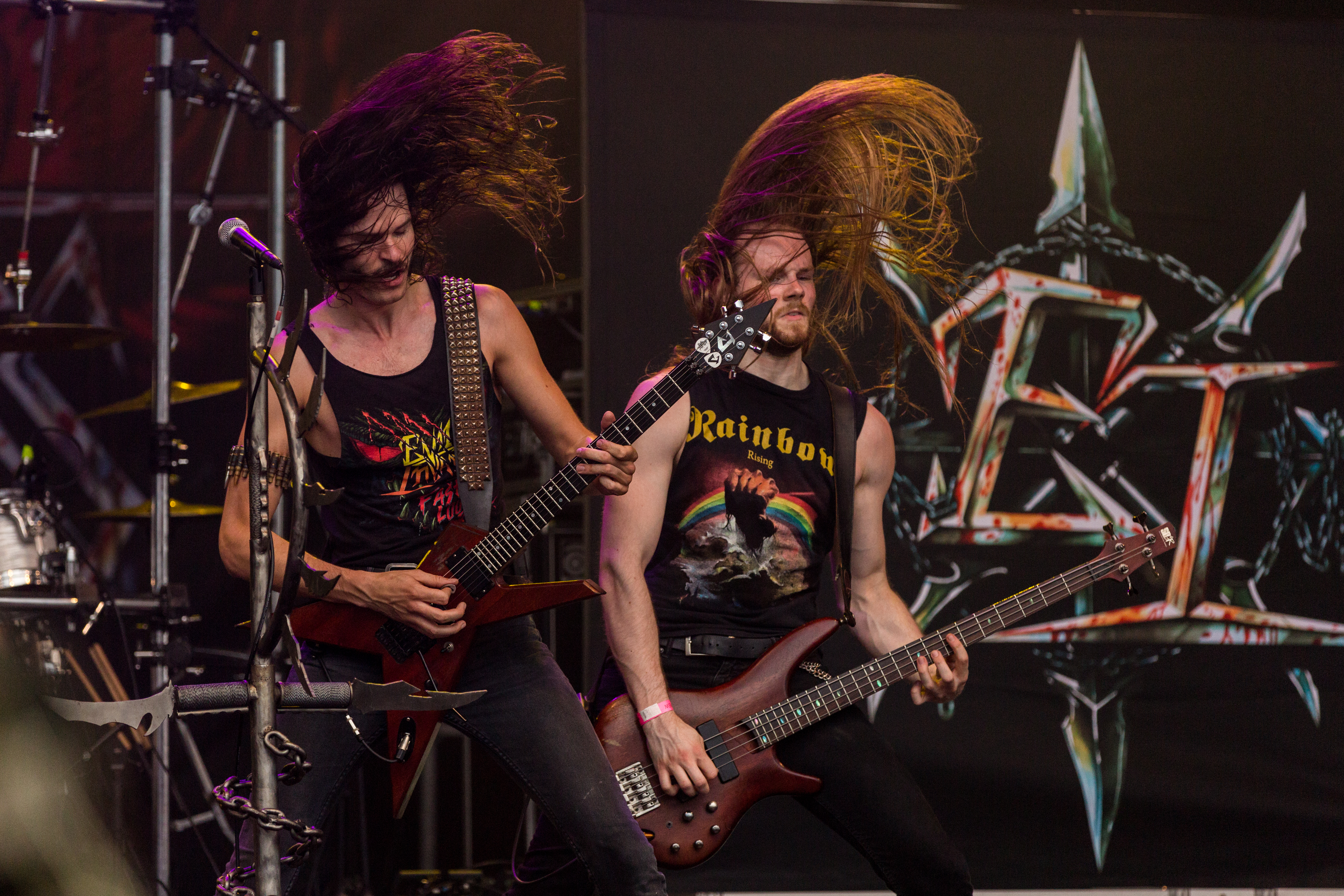
- Evil Invaders at Metal Frenzy, Gardelegen, 2017.

Background information
- Origin: Limburg, Belgium
- Genres: Thrash metal; speed metal
- Years active: 2007–present
- Members: Johannes Van Audenhove; Max Mayhem; Joeri van de Schoot; Senne Jacobs
- Past members: Speedfreak Frey; Stavrös Koekeloeres; Steve "Boner" Tomsin; Alain Hulsbosch; Sam Lemmens (died 2024); Nico Beekwilder

Evil Invaders are a Belgian thrash metal band from Limburg, founded in 2007. The band name is thought to be taken from Razor's 1985 album Evil Invaders. Following their first EP in 2013, the band were signed to Napalm Records and released their debut album in 2015. More EPs and full-lengths on Napalm followed, with their upcoming fourth album Weaponized Chaos to be released on 19 February 2027.

== Musical style and influences ==
Evil Invaders are generally considered thrash metal and speed metal. Frontman Johannes Van Audenhove has stated the band's influences are "heavy, thrash, progressive, old-school death… As the mix of all these influences tends to grow into something more unique than everything we've done before, I find it hard to put a label onto our music. It’s too aggressive for 'heavy metal,' but not thrashy or typical enough to slam the 'thrash' or 'speed' stamp on it."

== Discography ==
Studio albums

- Pulses of Pleasure (2015, Napalm Records)
- Feed Me Violence (2017, Napalm Records)
- Shattering Reflection (2022, Napalm Records)
- Weaponized Chaos (2027, Napalm Records)

EPs

- Evil Invaders (2013, Empire Records)
- In for the Kill (2016, Napalm Records)

Live albums

- Surge of Insanity (2019, Napalm Records)

Singles

- "Violence and Force" (Exciter cover for the tribute album Pounding Metal) (2017)
