= Errances =

Studio album by Angellore
- Released: 16 December 2012 (digital), 18 March 2013 (CD)
- Recorded: December 2009 – February 2011
- Studios: EverTone Studio, Gignac-L'Inerte (France)
- Genres: Death/doom, gothic metal
- Length: 46:13
- Label: Dreamcell11
- Producers: Angellore & Florent Krist

Angellore chronology
| Premiéres Liturgies - Soupirs d'Aurore (Compilation) (2012) | Errances (2012) | La Litanie des Cendres (2015) |

Professional ratings
Review scores
| Source | Rating |
|---|---|
| Aux Portes Du Metal | 19/20 |

Errances is the first full-length album by the French doom metal/gothic metal band Angellore. The title is French for 'wandering'. The album was first released as a digital version and later as CD through Dreamcell11.

== Track listing ==
| No. | Title | Lyrics | Music | Length |
|---|---|---|---|---|
| 1. | "Dans Les Vallées Eternelles" | Angellore | Angellore | 08:23 |
| 2. | "Tears Of Snow" | Angellore | Angellore | 08:22 |
| 3. | "I Am The Agony" | Rosarius | Angellore | 06:49 |
| 4. | "Weeping Ghost" | Angellore | Angellore | 04:29 |
| 5. | "Errance" | Walran | Angellore | 02:13 |
| 6. | "...Where Roses Never Die..." | Angellore | Rosarius | 07:30 |
| 7. | "Shades Of Sorrow" | Angellore | Angellore | 08:27 |
| Total length: | | | | 46:13 |

== Personnel ==
=== Angellore ===
- Rosarius – clean & harsh vocals, guitars, bass, keyboards
- Walran – clean & harsh vocals, keyboards
- Ronnie – drums

=== Session members ===
- Catherine Arquez – violin
