= Stoned Jesus =

Ukrainian stoner metal band

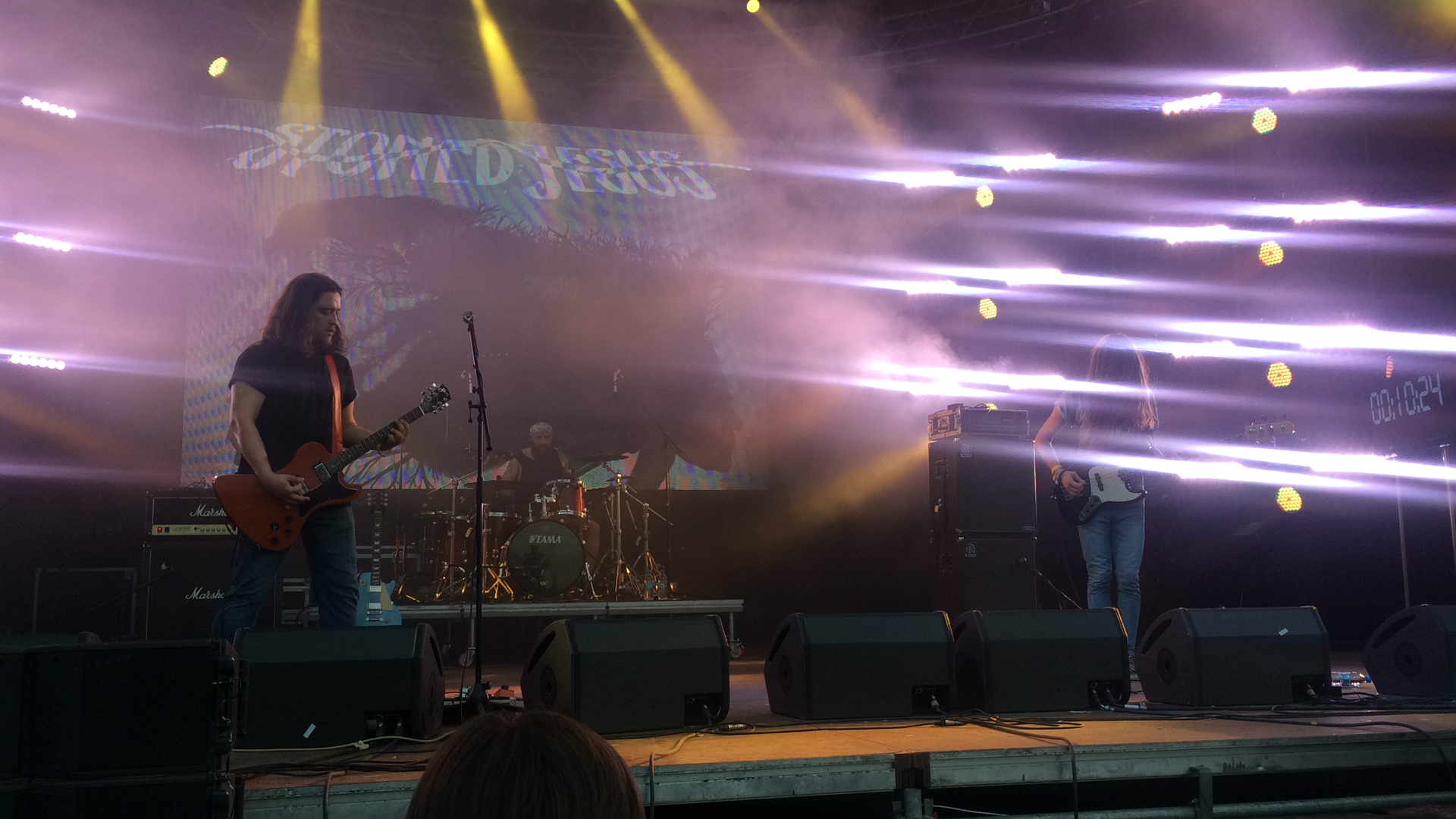
- Performance at Atlas Weekend 2017

Background information
- Origin: Kyiv, Ukraine
- Genres: Stoner metal; stoner rock; doom metal; psychedelic rock
- Years active: 2009–present
- Labels: Napalm; Season of Mist
- Members: Igor Sydorenko; Andrew Rodin; Yurii Ciel
- Past members: Mykola "Nick" Solar; Vadim Matiyko; Olexandr "Alex" Siry; Viktor Kondratov
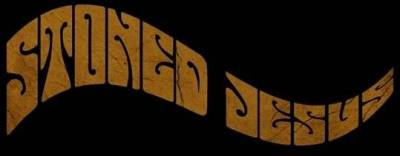

Stoned Jesus is a Ukrainian stoner metal band from Kyiv. Founded by Igor Sydorenko in 2009, the band has released eight full-length albums and several mini-albums.

In 2016, they performed at Hellfest. In January 2017, they became the first Ukrainian rock band to tour South America, performing in Chile, Argentina and Brazil. In 2018, the band signed to Napalm Records; however, they are now signed to Season of Mist.

== Discography ==
=== Studio albums ===
- First Communion (2010)
- Seven Thunders Roar (2012)
- The Seeds, vol. I (2013)
- The Harvest (2015)
- The Seeds, vol. II (2016)
- Pilgrims (2018)
- Father Light (2023)
- Songs to Sun (2025)
- Songs to Moon (2026)
- Songs to Earth (2027)

=== EP ===
- Stormy Monday (2011)

=== Singles ===
- Electric Mistress (2013)
