= Darko US =

American deathcore band

- Genres: Nu metalcore; progressive deathcore
- Years active: 2020–present
- Members: Tom Barber; Josh Miller
- Website: darkoband.com

Darko US is an American deathcore duo founded in 2020. The group consists of vocalist Tom Barber and multi-instrumentalist Josh "Baby J" Miller, both of whom are also members of Chelsea Grin.

They have been noted for their incorporation of elements of djent, electronic, trap and ambient music into their songs.

== Discography ==
=== Albums ===
- Darko (2021)
- Oni (2022)
- Starfire (2024)
- Oni 2 (2026)

=== EPs ===
- Dethmask, Pt. 1 (2020)
- Dethmask, Pt. 2 (2022)
- Dethmask 3 (2025)
- Cuckoo (2026)
