= 2025 in heavy metal music =

This is a timeline documenting the events of heavy metal in the year 2025.

== Bands disbanded ==
- Aldious (indefinite hiatus)
- Bury Your Dead
- Cannabis Corpse
- Code Orange (hiatus)
- Crossfaith (hiatus)
- Crystal Viper
- Diamond Head (hiatus)
- Eternal Tears of Sorrow
- Ithaca
- Jesus Piece
- Necrodeath
- Oceano
- One Morning Left
- Orange Goblin
- Riley's L.A. Guns
- Sarke
- Scissorfight
- Stray from the Path
- Sum 41
- Void of Vision
- Whitesnake
- Zulu (hiatus)

== Bands formed ==
- President

== Bands reformed ==
- After Forever (two shows)
- Annotations of an Autopsy (three shows)
- Black Sabbath (one-off)
- Charon (six shows)
- Children of Bodom (two shows)
- Dead Horse
- Firespawn
- Greeley Estates (one-off)
- I Killed the Prom Queen (six shows)
- Master's Hammer
- Meliah Rage
- Mortal Sin
- Mr. Big (four shows)
- Primer 55
- Rush
- Spinal Tap
- Spineshank
- Sybreed
- The Tony Danza Tapdance Extravaganza
- Triumph
- Twelve Foot Ninja
- Twisted Sister
- Vimic (one-off)

== Events ==
- On January 15, Exodus parted ways with longtime vocalist Steve "Zetro" Souza for a third time, with Rob Dukes returning to the band.
- On January 30, Sum 41 played the final date of their farewell tour at the Scotiabank Arena in Toronto.
- On March 7, Mastodon parted ways with longtime guitarist and vocalist Brent Hinds.
- On March 17, Katatonia parted ways with founding guitarist Anders Nyström.
- On March 22, Lynch Mob played their final show of their year-long farewell tour, titled "The Final Ride".
- On April 19, Savatage played their first show in nearly ten years at the Monsters of Rock festival in São Paulo.
- On April 25, Acid Bath played their first show in 28 years at the Filmore in New Orleans.
- On April 28, Soundgarden were announced among the 2025 inductees into the Rock and Roll Hall of Fame.
- On May 27, Iron Maiden played their first show of the "Run for Your Lives World Tour", celebrating their 50th anniversary, which will last until 2026.
- On July 5, Black Sabbath played one final farewell concert in Birmingham featuring the original lineup of Ozzy Osbourne, Tony Iommi, Geezer Butler, and Bill Ward.
- On August 14, Dave Mustaine announced that Megadeth's upcoming 2026 album is going to be the band's final release, and that it will be followed by a global farewell tour.
- On September 12, Spinal Tap II: The End Continues was released in theaters.
- On October 31, High Desert-based hard rock and heavy metal radio station KHDR (Highway Rock) was rebranded as KNAC (Pure Rock), resurrecting the radio station (originally based in Long Beach, California) that had gone off the air in 1995.
- On November 23, Arch Enemy parted ways with longtime vocalist Alissa White-Gluz after 11 years.
- On December 28, The Gathering parted ways with longtime vocalist Silje Wergeland after 16 years.
- Following major personnel changes in 2024, Grave's original members reunited for select festival performances in 2025, with additional appearances scheduled to continue into 2026. These performances highlighted the band’s first three classic albums — Into the Grave, You’ll Never See..., and Soulless — and, according to frontman Ola Lindgren, there were no plans for new material or extensive touring.
- After internal tensions that forced the band to cancel all 2024 live dates and go on hiatus, My Dying Bride returned to live performances in 2025. The shows featured guest vocalist Mikko Kotamäki of Swallow the Sun, temporarily filling in for founding member and vocalist Aaron Stainthorpe. On October 9, My Dying Bride stated on social media that they and Stainthorpe were officially separating, making his departure permanent.
- Angra announced that the band would take a break from touring and recording after finishing the tour celebrating the 20th anniversary of their fifth album Temple of Shadows, in March. However, the band would reunite for the Bangers Open Air festival on April 26, 2026, with the return of their 2001–2008 lineup that included guitarist Kiko Loureiro, drummer Aquiles Priester, and vocalist Edu Falaschi. This would also be the band's final performance with Fabio Lione, whose departure was announced on November 23.
- Necrodeath split up for the second and final time at the end of the year, following the release of a final album and a farewell tour.
- Uriah Heep began a farewell tour, titled The Magician's Farewell, in February, which is scheduled to last for two years.

== Deaths ==
- January 2 – Russ North, former vocalist of Cloven Hoof, died from undisclosed reasons at the age of 59.
- January 3 – Manfred Schütz, founder of SPV GmbH, died from undisclosed reasons at the age of 74.
- January 5 – Fredrik "Freddie Eugene" Lindgren, former guitarist of Unleashed and Terra Firma, died from undisclosed reasons at the age of 53.
- January 7 – Ragne Wahlquist, vocalist and guitarist of Heavy Load, died from undisclosed reasons at the age of 69.
- January 13 – Peter "P. Fluid" Forrest, former vocalist of 24-7 Spyz, was beaten to death at the age of 64.
- January 15 – Wayne Gerard Fabra, former drummer of Necrophagia, died from undisclosed reasons at the age of 58.
- January 16 – Cristiano Fusco, former guitarist of Torture Squad, died from bone marrow cancer at the age of 53.
- January 27 – Aaron Rossi, former drummer of Ministry and Prong, died from a heart attack at the age of 44.
- February 5 – Dave Jerden, engineer, producer and mixer of numerous hard rock and metal bands including Alice in Chains, Anthrax, Jane's Addiction and Spinal Tap, died from undisclosed reasons at the age of 75.
- February 11 – Jan-Martin Jensen, founder and organizer of Inferno Metal Festival, died from cancer.
- February 15 – Pål Mozart Bjørke, former bassist of Madder Mortem, died from undisclosed reasons.
- February 19 – Karl Cochran, former guitarist of Ace Frehley and Joe Lynn Turner, died in a car accident at the age of 61.
- February 25 – Coburn Pharr, former vocalist of Annihilator, died from undisclosed reasons at the age of 62.
- February 26 – Graham "Gra" Scoresby, former drummer of Witchfynde, died in a car accident at the age of 68.
- March 2 – Sindre Nedland, vocalist and keyboardist of In Vain and former vocalist of Funeral, died from cancer at the age of 40.
- March 6 – Sergio Cisneros "Kiskilla" Anguita, former keyboardist and accordionist of Mägo de Oz, died from COPD complications at the age of 58.
- March 11 – Joe McFadden, music industry executive who worked for EMI and Capitol Records and worked with numerous metal bands including Mötley Crüe, Megadeth, Iron Maiden, Five Finger Death Punch, Papa Roach, and The Hu, died from undisclosed reasons at the age of 77.
- March 15 – Les Binks, former drummer of Judas Priest, Lionheart and Tytan, died from undisclosed reasons at the age of 73.
- March 28 – Dirk Schröder, former vocalist of Iron Angel, died from undisclosed reasons.
- April 12 – Roy Thomas Baker, record producer for several heavy metal artists including Ozzy Osbourne, Mötley Crüe and Alice Cooper, died from undisclosed reasons at the age of 78.
- April 19 – Ricky Siahaan, guitarist of Seringai, died from a heart attack at the age of 48.
- April 29 – Brian Montana, former guitarist of Possessed, was shot to death by police at the age of 60.
- April 30 – Piotr Radecki, former guitarist of Kat & Roman Kostrzewski, died from undisclosed reasons at the age of 49.
- May 1 – Igor Molchanov, former drummer of Aria and Master, died from undisclosed reasons at the age of 63.
- May 4 – Lars Lindén, bassist of Carnal Forge, died from colon cancer at the age of 54.
- May 6 – Tony J. Liddle, former guitarist of Blitzkrieg, died from undisclosed reasons.
- May 13 – Dale Henderson, vocalist and guitarist of Beowülf, died from undisclosed reasons at the age of 59.
- May 19 – Chris Hager, former guitarist of Mickey Ratt and Rough Cutt, died from undisclosed reasons at the age of 67.
- May 19 – Adam Ramey, vocalist of Dropout Kings, died from suicide at the age of 31.
- May 22 – Daniel Williams, former drummer of The Devil Wears Prada, died in the 2025 San Diego Cessna Citation II crash at the age of 39.
- June 6 – Charles "Chuck" Profus, former drummer of Agent Steel, died from undisclosed reasons at the age of 61.
- July 4 – Kevin Riddles, bassist of Tytan and former bassist of Angel Witch, died from cancer at the age of 68.
- July 5 – Peter Brabbs, former guitarist of Tank, died from undisclosed reasons at the age of 68.
- July 8 – Tim Cronin, former vocalist, bassist and drummer of Monster Magnet, died from ALS at the age of 63.
- July 11 – David Kaff (better known as Viv Savage), former keyboardist of Spinal Tap, died from undisclosed reasons at the age of 79.
- July 22 – Ozzy Osbourne, solo artist and former vocalist of Black Sabbath, died from a heart attack at the age of 76.
- July 29 – Paul Mario Day, former vocalist of Iron Maiden and More, died from cancer at the age of 69.
- July 31 – Erik Wunder, multi-instrumentalist of Cobalt, died from undisclosed reasons at the age of 42.
- August 4 – Larry Gillstrom, guitarist of Kick Axe, died from cancer at the age of 69.
- August 6 – Harry Hill, former drummer of Fist, died from undisclosed reasons at the age of 69.
- August 8 – Jill Lisson, former vocalist and bassist of Funerus, died from heart failure related to complications from diabetes at the age of 54.
- August 20 – Brent Hinds, former vocalist and guitarist of Mastodon, died in a traffic collision at the age of 51.
- August 25 – Nisse Karlén, vocalist and former guitarist and bassist of Sacramentum, died by suicide at the age of 50.
- August 27 – Jürgen Bartsch, bassist of Bethlehem, died from an undisclosed illness.
- September 6 – Guido "Atomic Steif" Richter, former drummer of Sodom, Living Death, Assassin and Holy Moses, died from undisclosed reasons.
- September 7 – Allen Blickle, former drummer of Baroness, died from undisclosed reasons at the age of 42.
- September 16 – Tomas Lindberg, vocalist of At the Gates and Lock Up, and former vocalist of Grotesque and Nightrage, died from adenoid cystic carcinoma complications at the age of 52.
- October 7 – Edward Reekers, former long-term vocal contributor of Ayreon, died from cancer at the age of 68.
- October 8 – Ace Finchum, former drummer of Tigertailz, died from undisclosed reasons at the age of 62.
- October 11 – Ian Watkins, former vocalist of Lostprophets, was murdered in prison at the age of 48.
- October 12 – John Waterhouse, former guitarist of Demon, died from undisclosed reasons at the age of 75.
- October 12 – Jody Henry, former bassist of Omen, died from an intracerebral hemorrhage.
- October 16 – Ace Frehley, solo artist and former guitarist and vocalist of Kiss and Frehley's Comet, died from complications from a fall at the age of 74.
- October 18 – Sam Rivers, bassist of Limp Bizkit, died from cardiac arrest at the age of 48.
- October 23 – Marcie Free, former vocalist of King Kobra, died from undisclosed reasons at the age of 71.
- October 26 – Rasmus "Hække" Henriksen, former guitarist of Illdisposed and Panzerchrist, died from undisclosed reasons at the age of 47.
- October 27 – Bryan Johnston, former guitarist of Morpheus Descends, died from undisclosed reasons at the age of 50.
- November 2 – Thomas Klein, former guitarist of Warrant, died from undisclosed reasons at the age of 59.
- November 6 – Chris Bradley, vocalist and bassist of Savage, died after a long illness.
- December 14 – Rob Reiner, writer and director of This Is Spinal Tap and Spinal Tap II: The End Continues about parody heavy metal band Spinal Tap, was stabbed to death at the age of 78.
- December 21 – John Thomas "Jontho" Bratland, vocalist and former drummer of Ragnarok, died from undisclosed reasons at the age of 48.

== Albums released ==
=== January ===
| Day | Artist | Album |
|---|---|---|
| 3 | Paleface Swiss | Cursed |
| 6 | Dreadnaught | Shutdown in a Heartbeat |
| 10 | Ex Deo | Year of the Four Emperors (EP) |
| 10 | The Halo Effect | March of the Unheard |
| 10 | Stick to Your Guns | Keep Planting Flowers |
| 10 | Tremonti | The End Will Show Us How |
| 17 | Dark Fortress | Anthems from Beyond the Grave (live album) |
| 17 | Eidola | Mend |
| 17 | Grave Digger | Bone Collector |
| 17 | Necrodeath | Arimortis |
| 17 | Tokyo Blade | Time Is the Fire |
| 22 | Nemophila | Apple of My Eye |
| 24 | Avatarium | Between You, God, the Devil and the Dead |
| 24 | Blacktoothed | Headway |
| 24 | Bonfire | Higher Ground |
| 24 | Bumblefoot | Bumblefoot ...Returns! |
| 24 | Dax Riggs | 7 Songs for Spiders |
| 24 | Harakiri for the Sky | Scorched Earth |
| 24 | Labyrinth | In the Vanishing Echoes of Goodbye |
| 24 | Oni | Genesis (EP) |
| 24 | Riverside | Live ID. (live album) |
| 24 | Thin Lizzy | Acoustic Sessions |
| 30 | Enterprise Earth | Descent Into Madness |
| 31 | All That Remains | Antifragile |
| 31 | Confess | Destination Addiction |
| 31 | Pentagram | Lightning in a Bottle |
| 31 | Revenge | Violation.Strife.Abominate |
| 31 | Thomas Erak | (AU) |

=== February ===
| Day | Artist | Album |
|---|---|---|
| 7 | 16 | Guides for the Misguided |
| 7 | Dream Theater | Parasomnia |
| 7 | Impending Doom | Towards the Light (EP) |
| 7 | Jinjer | Duél |
| 7 | Majestica | Power Train |
| 7 | Marko Hietala | Roses from the Deep |
| 7 | Norilsk | Antipole |
| 7 | Obscura | A Sonication |
| 10 | Septicflesh | Amphibians (EP) |
| 14 | Bleeding Through | Nine |
| 14 | Church Tongue | You'll Know It Was Me (EP) |
| 14 | Crazy Lixx | Thrill of the Bite |
| 14 | Dawn of Solace | Affliction Vortex |
| 14 | Dynazty | Game of Faces |
| 14 | Lacuna Coil | Sleepless Empire |
| 14 | Mantar | Post Apocalyptic Depression |
| 14 | Raven | Can't Take Away the Fire (EP) |
| 14 | Scorpion Child | I Saw the End as It Passed Right Through Me |
| 14 | Twiztid | Welcome to Your Funeral |
| 14 | With Blood Comes Cleansing | With Blood Comes Cleansing |
| 18 | A Day to Remember | Big Ole Album Vol. 1 |
| 21 | David Lee Roth | The Warner Recordings 1985–1994 (box set) |
| 21 | Killswitch Engage | This Consequence |
| 21 | Nachtblut | Todschick |
| 21 | Pissgrave | Malignant Worthlessness |
| 21 | Sacrifice | Volume Six |
| 21 | Scour | Gold |
| 28 | Architects | The Sky, the Earth & All Between |
| 28 | Arion | The Light That Burns the Sky |
| 28 | Avantasia | Here Be Dragons |
| 28 | Brainstorm | Plague of Rats |
| 28 | Cloakroom | Last Leg of the Human Table |
| 28 | Dirkschneider | Balls to the Wall – Reloaded (covers album) |
| 28 | Enemy Inside | Venom |
| 28 | Eric Bass | I Had a Name |
| 28 | Hirax | Faster than Death |
| 28 | Master | 40 Years and Killing (EP) |
| 28 | Robin McAuley | Soulbound |

=== March ===
| Day | Artist | Album |
|---|---|---|
| 1 | Love/Hate | Punk Rock Fiesta! |
| 4 | Avulsed | Phoenix Cryptobiosis |
| 6 | Raging Speedhorn | Night Wolf |
| 7 | Balance Breach | Save Our Souls |
| 7 | Carnal Forge | The Fractured Process (EP) |
| 7 | Christian Mistress | Children of the Earth |
| 7 | Destruction | Birth of Malice |
| 7 | Edge of Paradise | Prophecy |
| 7 | Lacrimosa | Lament |
| 7 | Rainbows Are Free | Silver and Gold |
| 7 | Sadist | Something to Pierce |
| 7 | Spiritbox | Tsunami Sea |
| 7 | Whitechapel | Hymns in Dissonance |
| 7 | The Wildhearts | Satanic Rites of the Wildhearts |
| 14 | Coheed and Cambria | Vaxis – Act III: The Father of Make Believe |
| 14 | Dead Rabbitts | Redefined |
| 14 | Heathen | Bleed the World: Live (live album) |
| 14 | Manntra | Titans |
| 14 | Nightstalker | Return from the Point of No Return |
| 14 | Purified in Blood | Primal Pulse Thunder |
| 14 | Red Fang | Deep Cuts (compilation album) |
| 14 | Ricky Warwick | Blood Ties |
| 14 | Rwake | The Return of Magik |
| 14 | Simon McBride | Recordings 2020–2025 |
| 14 | Temperance | From Hermitage to Europe (live album) |
| 14 | Warbringer | Wrath and Ruin |
| 21 | Bloodywood | Nu Delhi |
| 21 | Cradle of Filth | The Screaming of the Valkyries |
| 21 | Disarmonia Mundi | The Dormant Stranger |
| 21 | Drudkh | Shadow Play |
| 21 | Imperial Triumphant | Goldstar |
| 21 | Lordi | Limited Deadition |
| 21 | Molotov Solution | Void (EP) |
| 21 | Pop Evil | What Remains |
| 21 | Psyclon Nine | And Then Oblivion |
| 21 | Rush | Rush 50 (box set) |
| 21 | Soul Demise | Against the Abyss |
| 28 | Alien Weaponry | Te Rā |
| 28 | Amenra | De Toorn |
| 28 | Amenra | With Fang and Claw |
| 28 | Arch Enemy | Blood Dynasty |
| 28 | The Darkness | Dreams on Toast |
| 28 | Deafheaven | Lonely People with Power |
| 28 | Don Airey | Pushed to the Edge |
| 28 | Judicator | Concord |
| 28 | Memphis May Fire | Shapeshifter |
| 28 | Ministry | The Squirrely Years Revisited (re-recorded album) |
| 28 | Sick Puppies | Wave the Bull |
| 28 | Svartsyn | Vortex of the Destroyer |
| 28 | Teitanblood | From the Visceral Abyss |
| 28 | Underoath | The Place After This One |

=== April ===
| Day | Artist | Album |
|---|---|---|
| 4 | Allegaeon | The Ossuary Lens |
| 4 | Benediction | Ravage of Empires |
| 4 | Bleed from Within | Zenith |
| 4 | L.A. Guns | Leopard Skin |
| 4 | Pigs Pigs Pigs Pigs Pigs Pigs Pigs | Death Hilarious |
| 4 | Rotting Christ | 35 Years of Evil Existence – Live in Lycabettus (live album) |
| 4 | Thornhill | Bodies |
| 8 | Necrophobic | Nordanvind (EP) |
| 11 | Annisokay | Abyss Pt. II (EP) |
| 11 | Elvenking | Reader of the Runes – Luna |
| 11 | Epica | Aspiral |
| 11 | In the Woods... | Otra |
| 11 | The Lord Weird Slough Feg | Traveller Supplement 1: The Ephemeral Glades (EP) |
| 11 | The Man-Eating Tree | Night Verses |
| 11 | Mark Morton | Without the Pain |
| 11 | Within Destruction | Animetal |
| 17 | Quartz | Six |
| 18 | Divide and Dissolve | Insatiable |
| 18 | Gama Bomb | Necronomicon Automaton (EP) |
| 18 | Teramaze | The Harmony Machine |
| 20 | Heavy Heavy Low Low | Pain Olympics |
| 23 | Ave Mujica | Completeness |
| 25 | Big Brave | OST |
| 25 | Cadaver | Hymns of Misanthropy |
| 25 | Caliban | Back from Hell |
| 25 | Cancer | Inverted World |
| 25 | Cirith Ungol | Live at the Roxy (live album) |
| 25 | Conan | Violence Dimension |
| 25 | Eluveitie | Ànv |
| 25 | Employed to Serve | Fallen Star |
| 25 | Ghost | Skeletá |
| 25 | Harem Scarem | Chasing Euphoria |
| 25 | Hate Forest | Against All Odds |
| 25 | Jack Starr | Out of the Darkness, Part II |
| 25 | Kanonenfieber | Live in Oberhausen (live album) |
| 25 | Landmvrks | The Darkest Place I've Ever Been |
| 25 | Liv Kristine | Amor Vincit Omnia |
| 25 | Machine Head | Unatøned |
| 25 | Pagan Altar | Never Quite Dead |
| 25 | Profanatica | Wreathed in Dead Angels (EP) |
| 25 | Sacred Steel | Ritual Supremacy |
| 25 | The Storyteller | The Final Stand |
| 25 | Sumac / Moor Mother | The Film |
| 25 | Trick or Treat | Ghosted |
| 25 | Wednesday 13 | Mid Death Crisis |
| 25 | Yngwie Malmsteen | Tokyo Live (live album) |

=== May ===
| Day | Artist | Album |
|---|---|---|
| 1 | Death SS | The Entity |
| 2 | Bleed | Bleed |
| 2 | Crematory | Destination |
| 2 | Hate | Bellum Regiis |
| 2 | Nightfall | Children of Eve |
| 2 | Propagandhi | At Peace |
| 2 | Puddle of Mudd | Kiss the Machine |
| 9 | Behemoth | The Shit Ov God |
| 9 | Candlemass | Black Star (EP) |
| 9 | Ghost Bath | Rose Thorn Necklace |
| 9 | Haken | Liveforms: An Evening with Haken (live album) |
| 9 | Novelists | Coda |
| 9 | Sleep Token | Even in Arcadia |
| 9 | Tetrarch | The Ugly Side of Me |
| 12 | Chthonic | Megaportal 2425 (EP) |
| 16 | Bury Tomorrow | Will You Haunt Me, with That Same Patience |
| 16 | The Callous Daoboys | I Don't Want to See You in Heaven |
| 16 | Confessions of a Traitor | This Pain Will Serve You |
| 16 | Full of Hell | Broken Sword, Rotten Shield (EP) |
| 16 | Mares of Thrace | The Loss |
| 16 | Pelican | Flickering Resonance |
| 16 | Sleep Theory | Afterglow |
| 16 | Steve Von Till | Alone in a World of Wounds |
| 16 | Tarja | Circus Life (live album) |
| 16 | Waltari | Nations' Neurosis |
| 23 | ...And Oceans | The Regeneration Itinerary |
| 23 | Onslaught | Origins of Aggression |
| 23 | Ronnie Romero | Live at Rock Imperium Festival (live album) |
| 23 | Witchcraft | Idag |
| 23 | Year of No Light | Les Maîtres Fous (live album) |
| 30 | Bloodhorse | A Malign Star |
| 30 | The Haunted | Songs of Last Resort |
| 30 | Hed PE | New and Improved (covers album) |
| 30 | Rivers of Nihil | Rivers of Nihil |
| 30 | Stray from the Path | Clockworked |
| 30 | Vader | Humanihility (EP) |
| 30 | Vildhjarta | + Där skogen sjunger under evighetens granar + |
| 30 | Wolves at the Gate | Wasteland |
| 30 | Wormrot | TNT (live album) |

=== June ===
| Day | Artist | Album |
|---|---|---|
| 6 | Battlesnake | Dawn of the Exultants and the Hunt for the Shepherd |
| 6 | Dawn of Ashes | Infecting the Scars |
| 6 | Gaahls Wyrd | Braiding the Stories |
| 6 | Katatonia | Nightmares as Extensions of the Waking State |
| 6 | King Parrot | A Young Person's Guide to King Parrot |
| 6 | Mystic Circle | Kriegsgötter MMXXV (compilation album) |
| 6 | Ophiolatry | Serpent's Verdict |
| 6 | Orthodox | A Door Left Open |
| 6 | Volbeat | God of Angels Trust |
| 9 | King 810 | Rustbelt Nu Metal |
| 13 | Byzantine | Harbingers |
| 13 | Fairyland | The Story Remains |
| 13 | Fallujah | Xenotaph |
| 13 | The Hu | Echos of Thunder (EP) |
| 13 | Ice Nine Kills | I Heard They Kill Live 2 (live album) |
| 13 | King Gizzard & the Lizard Wizard | Phantom Island |
| 13 | Saxon | Eagles Over Hellfest (live album) |
| 13 | Sigh | I Saw the World's End – Hangman's Hymn MMXXV (re-recorded album) |
| 20 | Alestorm | The Thunderfist Chronicles |
| 20 | Black Majesty | Oceans of Black |
| 20 | Cryptopsy | An Insatiable Violence |
| 20 | Helheim | HrabnaR / Ad Vesa |
| 20 | Jamie's Elsewhere | Alchemical (EP) |
| 20 | Malevolence | Where Only the Truth Is Spoken |
| 27 | Botch | 061524 (live album) |
| 27 | Crystal Viper | The Live Quest (live album) |
| 27 | Deadguy | Near-Death Travel Services |
| 27 | Heaven Shall Burn | Heimat |
| 27 | Higher Power | There's Love in This World if You Want It |
| 27 | Lord Belial | Unholy Trinity |
| 27 | Motörhead | The Manticore Tapes (compilation album) |
| 27 | Shadow of Intent | Imperium Delirium |
| 27 | Sodom | The Arsonist |
| 27 | Warlord | The Lost Archangel (compilation album) |

=== July ===
| Day | Artist | Album |
|---|---|---|
| 4 | Visions of Atlantis | Armada Live Over Europe (live album) |
| 4 | Warkings | Armageddon |
| 4 | Wytch Hazel | V: Lamentations |
| 11 | Beartooth | I Was a... Live (live album) |
| 11 | Born of Osiris | Through Shadows |
| 11 | Bring Me the Horizon | Lo-Files (remix album) |
| 11 | Calva Louise | Edge of the Abyss |
| 11 | Diamond Head | Live and Electric (live album) |
| 11 | Enter Shikari | Live at Wembley (live album) |
| 11 | Hell | Submersus |
| 11 | Split Chain | Motionblur |
| 18 | Abigail Williams | A Void Within Existence |
| 18 | Ashes of Ares | New Messiahs |
| 18 | Daron Malakian and Scars on Broadway | Addicted to the Violence |
| 18 | Five Finger Death Punch | Best Of – Volume 1 (re-recorded compilation album) |
| 18 | Obituary | Godly Beings (box set) |
| 18 | Slaughter to Prevail | Grizzly |
| 22 | Heaven Below | The Majestic Twelve |
| 25 | Beheaded | Għadam |
| 25 | Black Magnet | Megamantra |
| 25 | Enuff Z'Nuff | Xtra Cherries |
| 25 | Gwar | The Return of Gor Gor (EP) |

=== August ===
| Day | Artist | Album |
|---|---|---|
| 1 | Accvsed | Dealers of Doom |
| 1 | The Armed | The Future Is Here and Everything Needs to Be Destroyed |
| 1 | Car Bomb | Tiles Whisper Dreams (EP) |
| 1 | Fit for a King | Lonely God |
| 1 | Kayo Dot | Every Rock, Every Half-Truth Under Reason |
| 1 | Oni | Genesis Pt. II (EP) |
| 1 | To the Grave | Everyone's Still a Murderer (EP) |
| 5 | Aversions Crown | A Voice from the Outer Dark (EP) |
| 8 | Attack Attack! | Attack Attack! II |
| 8 | Babymetal | Metal Forth |
| 8 | Blackbraid | Blackbraid III |
| 8 | Dropout Kings | Yokai |
| 8 | Halestorm | Everest |
| 8 | Lord of the Lost | Opvs Noir Vol. 1 |
| 8 | Sinsaenum | In Devastation |
| 15 | Baest | Colossal |
| 15 | Chevelle | Bright as Blasphemy |
| 15 | Ellefson–Soto | Unbreakable |
| 15 | Grand Cadaver | The Rot Beneath (EP) |
| 15 | Incite | Savage New Times |
| 15 | Justice for the Damned | Stay Relentless |
| 15 | Mono Inc. | Darkness |
| 15 | Panopticon | Laurentian Blue |
| 15 | Panopticon | Songs of Hiraeth |
| 15 | Unleashed | Fire Upon Your Lands |
| 15 | Warmen | Band of Brothers |
| 22 | Arcadea | The Exodus of Gravity |
| 22 | Blackbriar | A Thousand Little Deaths |
| 22 | Burning Witches | Inquisition |
| 22 | Deftones | Private Music |
| 22 | Desaster | Kill All Idols |
| 22 | Feuerschwanz | Knightclub |
| 22 | Iron Savior | Reforged – Machine World |
| 22 | Mob Rules | Rise of the Ruler |
| 22 | Myrath | Reflections (compilation album) |
| 22 | Panzerchrist | Meleficium Part 2 |
| 22 | Signs of the Swarm | To Rid Myself of Truth |
| 22 | Three Days Grace | Alienation |
| 22 | We Came as Romans | All Is Beautiful... Because We're Doomed |
| 22 | Woe, Is Me | Daybreak |
| 29 | Helloween | Giants & Monsters |
| 29 | In Mourning | The Immortal |
| 29 | Månegarm | Edsvuren |
| 29 | Vicious Rumors | The Devil's Asylum |

=== September ===
| Day | Artist | Album |
|---|---|---|
| 5 | Before the Dawn | Cold Flare Eternal |
| 5 | Bent Sea | The Dormant Ruin |
| 5 | Blessthefall | Gallows |
| 5 | Dark Angel | Extinction Level Event |
| 5 | Eleine | We Stand United (EP) |
| 5 | Glenn Hughes | Chosen |
| 5 | Green Carnation | A Dark Poem, Pt. I: The Shores of Melancholia |
| 5 | Primal Fear | Domination |
| 5 | Tallah | Primeval: Obsession // Detachment |
| 5 | Ten56. | IO |
| 5 | Violator | Unholy Retribution |
| 12 | Arjen Anthony Lucassen | Songs No One Will Hear |
| 12 | Between the Buried and Me | The Blue Nowhere |
| 12 | Demon Hunter | There Was a Light Here |
| 12 | Der Weg einer Freiheit | Innern |
| 12 | Helstar | The Devil's Masquerade |
| 12 | I See Stars | The Wheel |
| 12 | Lorna Shore | I Feel the Everblack Festering Within Me |
| 12 | Mötley Crüe | From the Beginning (compilation album) |
| 12 | Nevertel | Start Again |
| 12 | Not Enough Space | Weaponize Your Rage |
| 12 | Spinal Tap | The End Continues |
| 12 | Sweet Savage | Bang |
| 19 | A Killer's Confession | Victim 2 |
| 19 | Ded | Resent |
| 19 | Heretoir | Solastalgia |
| 19 | I Prevail | Violent Nature |
| 19 | Igorrr | Amen |
| 19 | Kittie | Spit XXV (EP) |
| 19 | Novembers Doom | Major Arcana |
| 19 | Panopticon | The Poppies Bloom for No King (EP) |
| 19 | Paradise Lost | Ascension |
| 19 | Stoned Jesus | Songs to Sun |
| 19 | Wolfheart | Draconian Darkness II (EP) |
| 26 | Amorphis | Borderland |
| 26 | Dying Wish | Flesh Stays Together |
| 26 | From Fall to Spring | Entry Wounds |
| 26 | Mors Principium Est | Darkness Invisible |
| 26 | Paradox | Mysterium |
| 26 | PeelingFlesh | PF Radio 2 (EP) |
| 26 | President | King of Terrors (EP) |
| 26 | Rage | A New World Rising |
| 26 | Revocation | New Gods, New Masters |
| 26 | Scorpions | From the First Sting (compilation album) |
| 26 | Vintersorg | Vattenkrafternas Spel |
| 30 | Ribspreader | As Gods Devour |

=== October ===
| Day | Artist | Album |
|---|---|---|
| 3 | Agriculture | The Spiritual Sound |
| 3 | Author & Punisher | Nocturnal Birding |
| 3 | Bloodred Hourglass | We Should Be Buried Like This |
| 3 | Hooded Menace | Lachrymose Monuments of Obscuration |
| 3 | Michael Schenker Group | Don't Sell Your Soul |
| 3 | Kirk Windstein | Ethereal Waves |
| 3 | Ofermod | Drakosophia |
| 3 | Orbit Culture | Death Above Life |
| 3 | OvO | Gemma |
| 3 | Today Is the Day | Never Give In |
| 3 | Vernon Reid | Hoodoo Telemetry |
| 3 | Vimic | Open Your Omen |
| 10 | 40 Below Summer | Untethered |
| 10 | John 5 | Ghost |
| 10 | Nils Patrik Johansson | War and Peace |
| 10 | Sanguisugabogg | Hideous Aftermath |
| 10 | Testament | Para Bellum |
| 14 | Sunn O))) | Eternity’s Pillars b/w Raise the Chalice & Reverential (EP) |
| 17 | Age of Ruin | Nothingman |
| 17 | Battle Beast | Steelbound |
| 17 | Biohazard | Divided We Fall |
| 17 | Carach Angren | The Cult of Kariba (EP) |
| 17 | Coroner | Dissonance Theory |
| 17 | Erdling | Mana |
| 17 | Evoken | Mendacium |
| 17 | Extortionist | Stare into the Seething Wounds |
| 17 | Human Fortress | Stronghold |
| 17 | Immortal Disfigurement | Hell Is Right in Front of Us (EP) |
| 17 | Internal Bleeding | Settle All Scores |
| 17 | Sabaton | Legends |
| 17 | Tombs | Feral Darkness |
| 17 | Unto Others | I Believe in Halloween II (EP) |
| 17 | Wretched | Decay |
| 23 | Krallice | No Hope (EP) |
| 24 | The Acacia Strain | You Are Safe from God Here |
| 24 | Adept | Blood Covenant |
| 24 | Bangalore Choir | Rapid Fire Succession: On Target Part II |
| 24 | Coldrain | Optimize (EP) |
| 24 | Conjurer | Unself |
| 24 | Dayseeker | Creature in the Black Night |
| 24 | Doro | Warriors of the Sea (compilation album) |
| 24 | Ektomorf | Heretic |
| 24 | Five Finger Death Punch | Best Of – Volume 2 (compilation album of re-recordings) |
| 24 | Leprous | An Evening of Atonement (live album) |
| 24 | Nine Treasures | Seeking the Absolute |
| 24 | Ronnie Romero | Backbone |
| 24 | Seraina Telli | Green |
| 24 | Serj Tankian | Covers, Collaborations & Collages (compilation album) |
| 24 | Soulfly | Chama |
| 24 | Sumo Cyco | Neon Void |
| 24 | Warrant | The Speed of Metal |
| 24 | Wino | Create or Die |
| 31 | Aria | When Tomorrow Comes |
| 31 | Avatar | Don't Go in the Forest |
| 31 | Aviana | Void |
| 31 | Chimaira | Creepers Vol. 1 (compilation album) |
| 31 | Currents | All That Follows (EP) |
| 31 | Despised Icon | Shadow Work |
| 31 | King 810 | Rustbelt Numetal 2 |
| 31 | Mägo de Oz | Malicia: la noche de las brujas |
| 31 | Moonspell | Opus Diabolicum (live album) |
| 31 | Mystic Circle | Hexenbrand 1486 |
| 31 | Primitive Man | Observance |
| 31 | Runemagick | Cycle of the Dying Sun (Dawn of Ashen Realms) |
| 31 | Smash into Pieces | Armaheaven |
| 31 | Solence | Angels Calling |
| 31 | Stephen Brodsky | Cut to the Core Vol. 1 (covers album) |
| 31 | Trivium | Struck Dead (EP) |
| 31 | Unprocessed | Angel |

=== November ===
| Day | Artist | Album |
|---|---|---|
| 7 | Agnostic Front | Echoes in Eternity |
| 7 | Alcatrazz | Prior Convictions |
| 7 | Astronoid | Stargod |
| 7 | Beastwars | The Ship // The Sea |
| 7 | Centinex | With Guts and Glory |
| 7 | Drain | ...Is Your Friend |
| 7 | Esprit D'Air | Aeons |
| 7 | Finger Eleven | Last Night on Earth |
| 7 | Novembre | Words of Indigo |
| 7 | Omnium Gatherum | May the Bridges We Burn Light the Way |
| 7 | Primordial | Live in New York City (live album) |
| 7 | Pupil Slicer | Fleshwork |
| 14 | 1914 | Viribus Unitis |
| 14 | The Devil Wears Prada | Flowers |
| 14 | Of Mice & Men | Another Miracle |
| 14 | Rise of the Northstar | Chapter 4: Red Falcon Super Battle! Neo Paris War!! |
| 14 | Scorpions | Coming Home Live (live album) |
| 14 | Violent Vira | Lover of a Ghost |
| 20 | AngelMaker | This Used to Be Heaven |
| 20 | Born from Pain | Siege Mentality (EP) |
| 21 | Bloodbound | Field of Swords |
| 21 | Def Leppard | Diamond Star Heroes: Live from Sheffield (live album) |
| 21 | Dream Theater | Dream Theater Vol. 3 (box set) |
| 21 | Dream Theater | The Studio Albums 1992–2016 (box set) |
| 21 | The Halo Effect | We Are Shadows (covers EP) |
| 21 | My Ticket Home | Pure to a Fault |
| 21 | Sister | The Way We Fall |
| 21 | Sortilège | Le Poids de L’Âme |
| 21 | Stryper | The Greatest Gift of All |
| 21 | Treat | The Wild Card |
| 26 | Master's Hammer | Maldorör Disco |
| 28 | 1349 | Winter Mass (live album) |
| 28 | Blut Aus Nord | Ethereal Horizons |
| 28 | Dream Theater | Quarantième: Live à Paris (live album) |
| 28 | Equilibrium | Equinox |
| 28 | Lynch Mob | Dancing with the Devil |

=== December ===
| Day | Artist | Album |
|---|---|---|
| 5 | Blood Red Throne | Siltskin |
| 5 | Enthroned | Ashspawn |
| 5 | Persefone | Live in Andorra (live album) |
| 5 | Tesseract | Radar (live album) |
| 5 | Upon a Burning Body | Blood of the Bull |
| 9 | Sakis Tolis | Everything Comes to an End |
| 12 | Dangerous Toys | Demolition (compilation album) |
| 12 | Lord of the Lost | Opvs Noir Vol. 2 |
| 12 | Rotten Sound | Mass Extinction (EP) |
| 12 | Volumes | Mirror Touch |
| 12 | Walk in Darkness | Gods Don't Take Calls |

| Preceded by 2024 | Heavy Metal Timeline; 2025 | Succeeded by 2026 |
