= Black Magick Sorceress =

EP by Runemagick
- Released: October 2005
- Recorded: 2005, Magick Sound/Los Angered Recording
- Genre: Death-doom
- Length: 22:22
- Label: Aftermath Music

Runemagick chronology
Envenom (2005)	Black Magick Sorceress (2005)	Invocation of Magick (2006)

Black Magick Sorceress is an EP by the Swedish death doom metal band Runemagick. It was released in 2005 on Aftermath Music on vinyl only.

== Track listing ==
=== Side A ===
1. "Black Magick Sorceress" – 14:01

=== Side B ===
1. "The Rising" – 3:33
2. "Wizard with the Magick Runes" – 4:48

== Credits ==
- Nicklas "Terror" Rudolfsson - vocals, guitar
- Emma Karlsson - bass
- Daniel Moilanen - drums
