= Norilsk (disambiguation) =

Norilsk is a city in Krasnoyarsk Krai, Russia.

Norilsk may also refer to:

- Norilsk (band), Gatinea, Quebec based noise band
- Norilsk Airport, a.k.a. Alykel Airport, nr. Norilsk
- Norilsk Nickel, a mining company
- MFK Norilsk Nickel, Russian futsal club

== See also ==
- Norilsk uprising
