= Learning to Dissolve =

Learning To Dissolve

Studio album by Orthodox TN
- Released: August 19, 2022
- Studios: Graphic Nature Audio (Bellevillle, New Jersey)
- Genres: Metalcore, nu metal
- Length: 41:45
- Label: Century Media
- Producer: Randy LeBoeuf

Orthodox TN chronology
Let It Take Its Course (2020)	Learning To Dissolve (2022)	A Door Left Open (2025)

Singles from Learning to Dissolve
- 1. "Head On A Spike" Released: June 24, 2022; 2. "Cave In" Released: July 13, 2022; 3. "Dissolve" Released: August 2, 2022; 4. "Nothing to See" Released: February 3, 2023

Learning to Dissolve is the fourth studio album by American metalcore band Orthodox, released on August 19, 2022 through Century Media Records.

== Background ==
In early 2020 Orthodox had signed a record deal with Century Media but had only announced it a year later on October 15, 2021, when they released their label debut single, "Body and Soul". The band had also announced that they were in the process of creating an album to follow after the single, enlisting producer Randy LeBoeuf, who has worked with fellow Tennessee band Chamber's Cost of Sacrifice and Massachusetts-based band The Acacia Strain's Slow Decay.

The band released four singles with music videos directed by to promote the album. Three of the videos were made in collaboration with director Nick Chance, following a storyline. The first video was for "Head On A Spike", released on June 24, 2022, featuring a man crawling on his hands and knees and being dragged and kidnapped by the band members. The next video was for "Cave In", released on July 13, 2022, following the same man lifting his head out of a bucket filled with water, looking in a mirror, and ending up in a room of an abandoned house where he is grabbed by the neck of his shirt by vocalist Adam Easterling, leading into the video for the third single, "Dissolve", released on August 2, 2022. The mentioned video features Easterling shoving the man through a door into a room in the abandoned house. Between clips of the band performing, the man is seen sitting alone in the room in fear and walking up a staircase in the house.

== Themes ==
The album is based around self-reflection.

Responding to a question on lyrical themes, frontman Adam Easterling had said:

“The whole record Is about growing up and realizing that the things you wanted or the people that you loved when you were young don’t always align with your moral compass as you get older, learning to dissolve is about finding your own way. It’s about coming into your own as a person and deciding what’s right for you. Basically, living in your own solidarity or dissolving in complacency.”

~ Adam Easterling, Orthodox - Learning to Dissolve - Metal Epidemic

== Release ==
On the day of release of the album, Century Media uploaded an audio video of the album's first track, "Feel It Linger" on their official YouTube channel. A music video for the song "Nothing to See" was released on February 3, 2023, featuring a compilation of the band playing at various concerts in support of the album. On May 5, 2023, a video was released featuring the band playing a show on August 28, 2022, at The End in Nashville, Tennessee in celebration of the release of the album. Five days later on May 11, they announced a summer tour titled the Fortune Favors The Cold Tour, with guests Chamber, 156/Silence, Momentum, and Cell. This tour went from July 6 to August 13.

== Track listing ==
All tracks are written by Orthodox.

No.	Title	Length
1.	"Feel It Linger"	4:39
2.	"Head On A Spike"	3:26
3.	"Cave In"	3:47
4.	"Become Divine"	3:43
5.	"Digging Through Glass"	3:18
6.	"Nothing To See"	3:37
7.	"1 1 7 6 2"	1:43
8.	"Dissolve"	3:06
9.	"Fast Asleep"	4:37
10.	"All That I Am"	4:06
11.	"Voice in the Choir"	5:37
Total length:		41:45

== Personnel ==
=== Orthodox ===
- Adam Easterling - vocals
- Austin Evans - guitars, vocals
- Shiloh Krebs - bass
- Mike White - drums

=== Production ===
- Randy LeBoeuf - production, mixing
- Ridge Rhine - artwork
