= Moon Lovers =

Moon Lovers may refer to:

- Moon Lovers: Scarlet Heart Ryeo, a 2016 South Korean TV series that had the working title Moon Lovers
- Tsuki no Koibito (English: Moon Lovers), a 2010 Japanese TV series
- Moonlover, a 2015 album by Ghost Bath
- "Moon Lovers", a song by Slapp Happy from their album, Ça Va
