= Asunojokei =

Japanese doujin music group

Asunojokei 明日の叙景
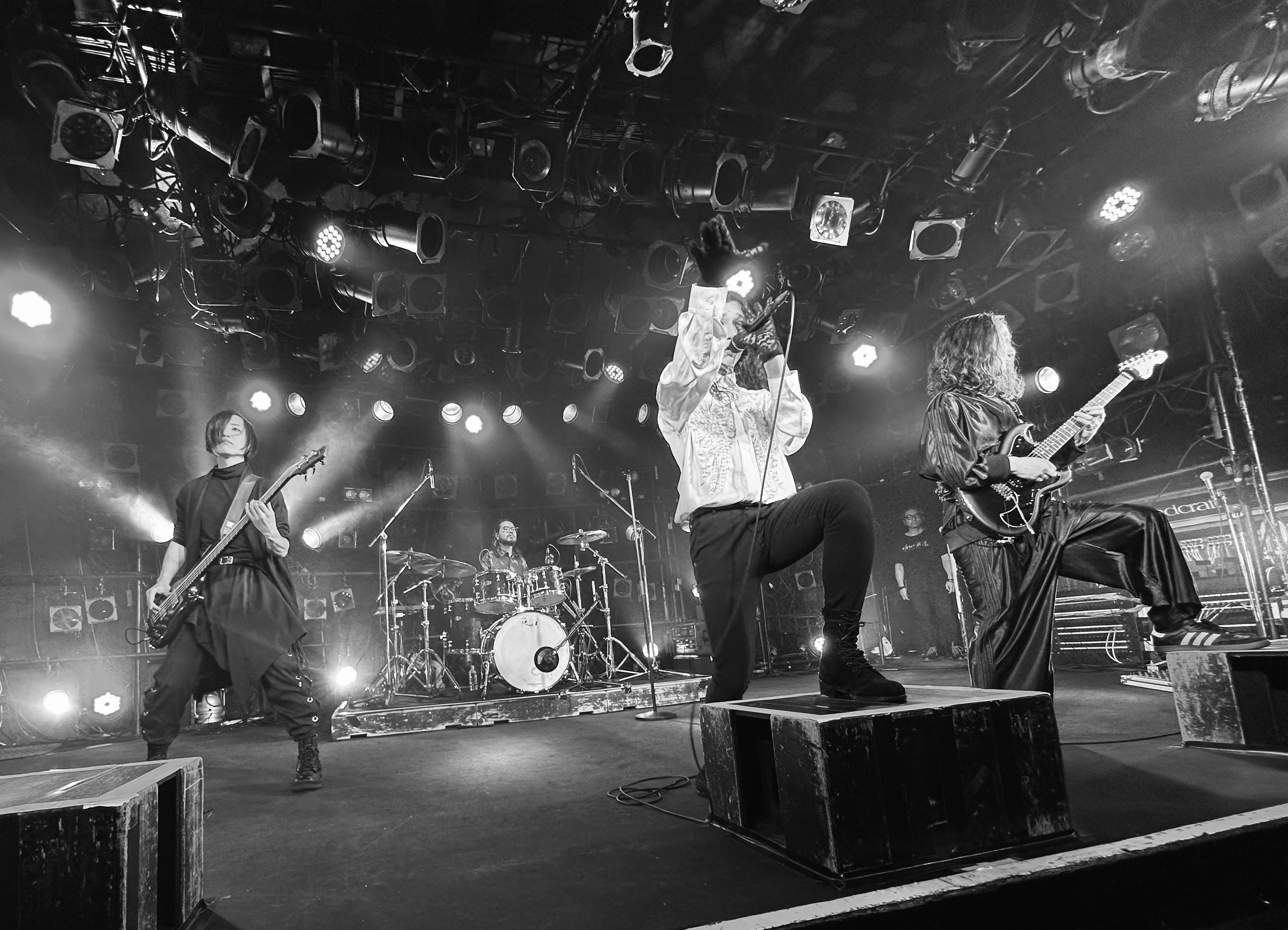
- Asunojokei performing in Tokyo, 2025.

Background information
- Origin: Taitō, Japan
- Genres: Post-black metal; Post-hardcore; Blackgaze
- Years active: 2014–present: Pest · Tear Water · Independent
- Members: Daiki Nuno; Kei Toriki; Takuya Seki; Seiya Saito
- Website: www.asunojokei.com

Asunojokei is a Japanese post-black metal/blackgaze group formed in Taitō ward, Tokyo, Japan, in 2014.

== History ==
The band was formed by vocalist Daiki Nuno, guitarist Kei Toriki, bassist Takuya Seki and drummer Saitō in Taitō City in 2014. A few months after the group's formation Asunojokei which means ′Scenery of Tomorrow′ in English language released a two-track demo which can be downloaded for free at the band's Bandcamp profile. In 2016, the group released their first EP A Bird in the Fault independently. Later the EP was released internationally by Chinese metal label Pest Productions. Two years later Asunojokei produced and published their debut album Awakening which was released independently and was re-released by Pest Productions.

In 2020, Asunojokei and Canadian metal band Unreqvited released a split via Tear Water Records. A year prior the band contributed songs for a 4-way split with Pale, Nhomme and Tochu-Kasu. In December 2020 the second EP Wishes was released independently.

The group performed five shows in Mainland China in 2018. In January 2021, it was announced that Asunojokei would contribute the song City of Commerce for the soundtrack for Nier Replicant ver.1.22474487139. On August 17, 2022, the second album Island was released and received international praise. The album charted on 224 in the Japanese albums chart by Oricon.

It was announced that Asunojokei will play as a support band for Boris on their European tour in May 2023 which will be the first European shows for Asunojokei overall.

== Musical style ==
In the category Bandcamp Beauties of the column Metalsplitter by German online music magazine Laut.de the music of Asunojokei was officially introduced on August 26, 2020. In this introduction it is said that the members would combine at least influences of ten groups in their music. The musical style was described as a mixture of Post metal, black metal, prog and the craziness of Dir En Grey. Despite their metal roots it is said that the musicians use Math rock and shoegaze elements in their sound as well.

On Stereogum the music of Asunojokei was compared to Kvelertak and Deafheaven.

Lyrically, the musicians are inspired by Light novels and Japanese popular literature.

== Discography ==
- 2015: Demo (Download-Demo, Independent, downloadable for free on Bandcamp)
- 2016: A Bird in the Fault (EP, Independent, international distribution via Pest Productions)
- 2018: Awakening (Album, Independent, international distribution via Pest Productions)
- 2019: Two (4-Way-Split with Pale, Nhomme and Tochu-Kaso, Independent)
- 2020: Nocturne (Split with Unreqvited, Tear Water Records)
- 2020: Wishes (EP, Independent)
- 2022: Island (Album, Independent)
- 2024: "Live Album: Island in Full" (Live Album, Independent)
- 2025: Think of You (Album, Independent)
