= Darkness Death Doom =

Studio album by Runemagick
- Released: March 16, 2003
- Genre: Death metal
- Length: 58:48
- Label: Aftermath Music

Runemagick chronology
Moon of the Chaos Eclipse (2002)	Darkness Death Doom (2003)	On Funeral Wings (2004)

Professional ratings
Review scores
Source	Rating
Rock Hard	9/10

Darkness Death Doom is the sixth album by Runemagick. It was released on March 16, 2003 on Aftermath Music.

== Background ==
The album was recorded at Andy LaRocque's Los Angered Recording in Gothenburg, and Runemagick's Magick Sound Studio.

== Critical reception ==
Powermetal.de recommended the tracks "Ancient Incantations", "The Venom", and "Darken Thy Flesh"

== Track listing ==
No.	Title	Length
1.	"Intro – CDXLIV"	1:42
2.	"Ancient Incantations"	7:37
3.	"Eyes Of Kali"	8:48
4.	"The Venom"	9:00
5.	"Darken Thy Flesh"	5:58
6.	"Doomed"	5:52
7.	"Eternal Dark"	5:12
8.	"DDD"	2:11
9.	"Winter"	7:07
10.	"Outro – 444"	5:18
Total length:		58:55

A limited edition contains a bonus CD, titled The Pentagram.

No.	Title	Length
1.	"The Pentagram"	37:55
2.	"Landscape Of Souls"	2:28
3.	"Moon Of The Chaos Eclipse"	3:46
4.	"Darkness Death Doom"	2:55
5.	"The Secret Alliance"	3:30
6.	"Piece Of Magick"	2:01
7.	"Preludium"	0:59
8.	"...Of Darkness"	0:47
9.	"Milbeg"	2:22
Total length:		56:43

== Credits ==
- Nicklas Rudolfsson – vocals, guitar
- Emma Karlsson – bass
- Daniel Moilanen – drums
