= The Supreme Force of Eternity =

Studio album by Runemagick
- Released: 1998
- Genre: Death metal Doom metal
- Length: 36:26
- Label: Century Media

Runemagick chronology
The Supreme Force of Eternity (1998)	Enter the Realm of Death (1998)

Professional ratings
Review scores
Source	Rating
AllMusic	3/5
Rock Hard	8/10

The Supreme Force of Eternity is the debut album by Runemagick.

== Track listing ==
1. "At the Horizons End" – 8:01
2. "The Black Wall" – 4:14
3. "When Death Is the Key" – 4:29
4. "For You, My Death" – 3:52
5. "Curse of the Dark Rune" – 3:20
6. "Nocturnal Creation" – 4:58
7. "The Supreme Force" – 4:37
8. "Sign of Eternity (Pt. II)" – 2:53

== Credits ==
- Nicklas "Terror" Rudolfsson - Vocals, Guitar
- Jonas Blom - Drums
- Fredrik Johnsson - Guitar
- Peter Palmdahl - Bass
- Fredrik Nordström - keyboards
