= Music Man Sabre (electric guitar) =

Sabre
- Manufacturer: Music Man
- Period: 1978 — 1980

Construction
- Body type: Solid
- Neck joint: Bolt-on

Woods
- Body: Ash, Poplar
- Neck: Maple
- Fretboard: Maple, Rosewood

Hardware
- Bridge: Fixed
- Pickup: Two humbucking pickups (HH) with 2 band EQ preamp.

Colors available
- Natural, black, white, sunburst, walnut and silver (custom).

The Music Man Sabre was an electric guitar manufactured by Music Man from 1978 until 1980. It came in two versions, the I and the II, that were identical other than the necks. The neck on the I had a 12” fretboard radius and standard size frets, while the II had a 7.5” fretboard radius and smaller, vintage style frets.

In 2021 the model was reintroduced with updated specifications and new finishes available.

== History ==
The guitar was designed by Leo Fender and George Fullerton, and was the second electric guitar manufactured under the Music Man name, after the StingRay that was launched two years before, in 1976.

== Features ==
It featured an internal preamp that allowed the guitar to retain its tonal response regardless of the volume level or cable length, factors that would usually reduce treble. The preamp module also featured an active EQ circuit with independent volume, treble, and bass controls, as well as bright, phase reversal, and three way pick up selector switches. The two pickups had a double coil humbucking design, similar to that found on the Music Man StingRay bass guitar. The body was made from ash or poplar depending on the model, and the 22 fret neck was made from maple (with an optional rosewood fingerboard) and featured a neck tilt adjustment to eliminate the need for shims.

== Notable users ==
- Leah Levinson of black metal band Agriculture.
