= Deathwish (album) =

Studio album by Within Destruction
- Released: 30 March 2018
- Genre: Deathcore; slam death metal
- Length: 37:05
- Label: Unique Leader Records (re-release)

Within Destruction chronology
Void (2016)	Deathwish (2018)	Yōkai (2020)

Singles from Deathwish
- 1. "Human Defect" Released: 16 February 2018; 2. "Self-Hatred" Released: 24 September 2018

Deathwish is the third studio album by Slovenian deathcore band Within Destruction, released on 30 March 2018. It is their last album with bassist Janez Skumavc and guitarists Damir Juretič and Kristjan Bajuk. The album was mixed and mastered by Fit for an Autopsy guitarist Will Putney. After having released the album independently, the band would sign to Unique Leader Records in September 2018 and re-release the album through the label in October 2018. A music video was released for the song "Self Hatred". In support of the album, the band toured in Europe in 2018 with Stillbirth and Walking Dead on Broadway and in the United States in 2019 with Lorna Shore, Enterprise Earth and Bodysnatcher.

== Track listing ==
1. "External Interference" (intro) – 1:33
2. "Deathwish" (featuring Duncan Bentley) – 4:05
3. "False Revelation" – 3:07
4. "Extinction" – 3:42
5. "Torture Ritual" – 3:30
6. "Human Defect" (featuring Dickie Allen) – 3:31
7. "Downfall of Humanity" – 3:50
8. "Darkness Swallows Life" (featuring guitar solo by Adam De Micco) – 3:52
9. "Self-Hatred" – 3:56
10. "Death Awaits Us All" – 5:04
11. "HMR45" (outro) – 0:55

== Personnel ==
- Rok Rupnik – vocals
- Damir Juretič – guitars
- Kristjan Bajuk – guitars
- Janez Skumavc – bass
- Luka Vezzosi – drums
