= Yōkai (album) =

Studio album by Within Destruction
- Released: 12 August 2020
- Genre: Deathcore; metalcore; trap metal
- Length: 40:00

Within Destruction chronology
| Deathwish (2018) | Yōkai (2020) | Lotus (2022) |

Professional ratings
Review scores
| Source | Rating |
|---|---|
| Dead Rhetoric | 8/10 |
| Distorted Sound | 5/10 |
| Metal Noise | 7.5/10 |

Yōkai is the fourth studio album by Slovenian deathcore band Within Destruction, released on 12 August 2020. Departing from the band's earlier brutal deathcore roots, the album showed influences from hip-hop, pop, electronic-music, and Japanese themes. It is their first album with guitarist/bassist Howard Fang, and the only album with guitarist Francesco Filigoi who left the band in 2021 due to a wrist injury. The band promoted the album with an Australian tour in June 2022, supported by Signs of the Swarm and Teeth.

== Track listing ==
1. "Yomi" (intro) – 1:33
2. "Yōkai" (featuring Ryo Kinoshita) – 3:46
3. "Harakiri" (featuring Bill $aber) – 3:24
4. "No Way Out" – 3:20
5. "Malevolent" – 2:42
6. "Kings of Darkness" – 3:56
7. "Alone" – 3:31
8. "Hate Me" – 3:59
9. "Backstab" – 3:25
10. "No Mercy" – 2:18
11. "B4ngb4ng!!" (featuring TYOSiN and KAMIYADA) – 3:14
12. "Sakura" (featuring guitar solo by Jason Richardson) – 2:57
13. "Tokoyo-no-Kuni" (outro) – 1:55

== Personnel ==
- Rok Rupnik – vocals
- Francesco Filigoi – guitars
- Howard Fang – guitars, bass
- Luka Vezzosi – drums
