= Zuriaake =

Chinese black metal band

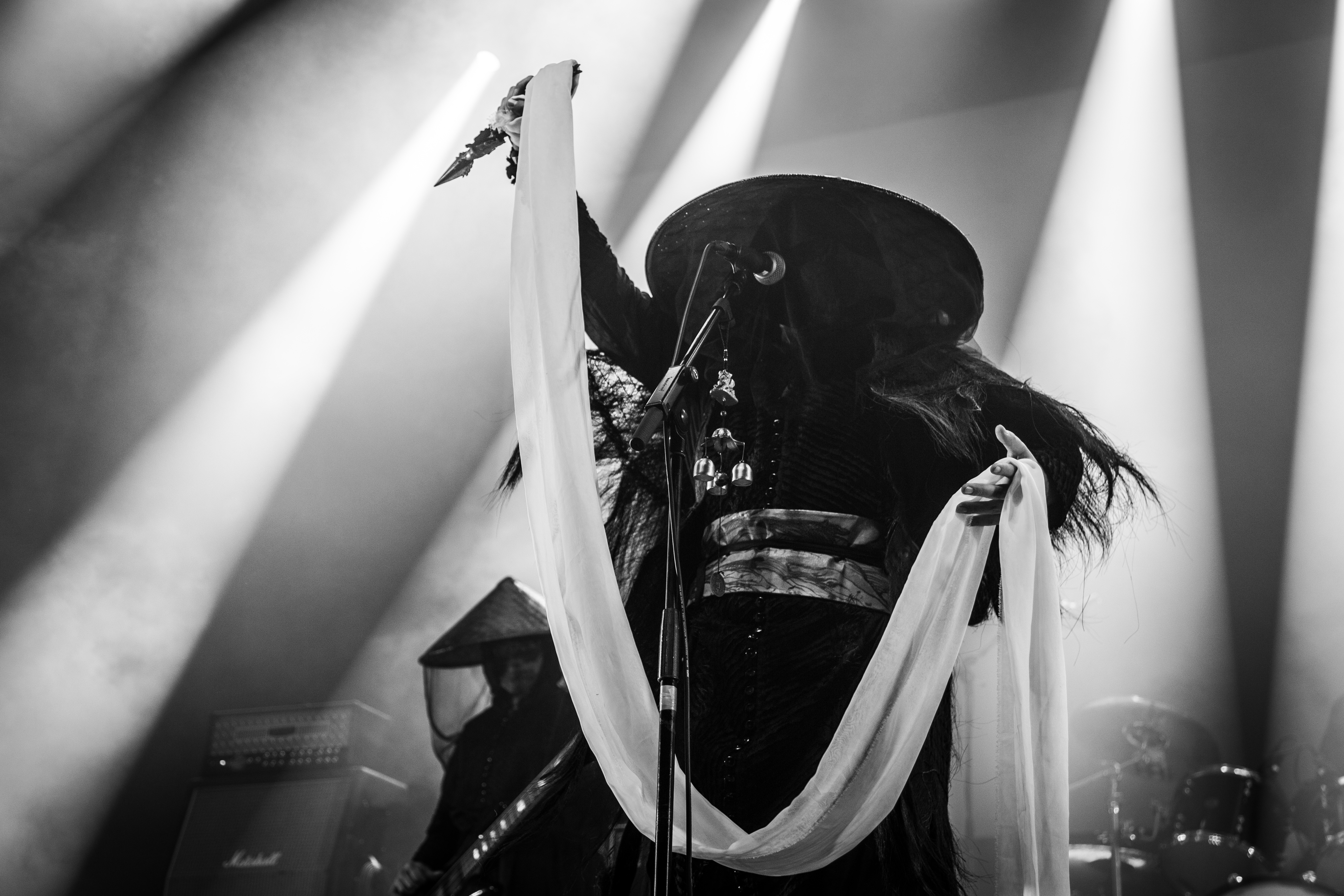
- Zuriaake performing at Roadburn Festival in Tilburg, Netherlands, 2018

Background information
- Origin: Jinan, Shandong, China
- Genre: Black metal
- Years active: 1998–present
- Labels: Black Happiness; Pest; Season of Mist
- Members: Bloodsea; Bloodfire; Deadsphere

Zuriaake (Chinese: 葬尸湖; pinyin: Zàngshīhú) is a Chinese black metal band formed in Jinan in 1998.

== History ==
Zuriaake was formed in Jinan, Shandong province in 1998 by Bloodsea and Bloodfire. In 2004 the band's lineup was completed by recruiting their third band member Deadsphere. According to an article by South China Morning Post, Zuriaake is one of the longest active metal bands in China. Little is known of the group's history, but an article from South China Morning Post reported that the alleged singer is Liu Yao, a professor in the School of Materials Science and Engineering at Shandong University.

After signing with Black Happiness Records, China's first music label specialized on black metal, Zuriaake released a split CD named Autumn of Sad Ode – Siming of Loulan alongside Bloodfires' other musical venture Yn Gizarm. Zuriaake got signed to Pest Productions in 2006 and released their debut album Afterimage of Autumn the following year. In 2015 Zuriaake released the Gu Yan EP with two tracks which was re-released as a full-length album with more tracks the same year. Due to Bloodfire being absent for four years between 2008 and 2012 where he studied in Germany the band was mostly inactive until the release of Gu Yan in 2015. The band recorded their concert in Beijing and released the Live in Beijing DVD in 2015 as well, which was not for sale but was sent to the attendees of the concert.

In 2017 Zuriaake was invited to play at Steelfest Open Air in Finland which marked the very first performance for the band in Europe. At the same time Zuriaake became the first Chinese metal band to play a concert in Northern Europe territories. Between August 2, 2019, and August 19, 2019, the band toured throughout Europe and played several music festivals such as the Wacken Open Air. In 2018 Zuriaake played at Roadburn Festival in the Netherlands and Brutal Assault in the Czech Republic.

In March 2020 French metal label Season of Mist announced the signing of Zuriaake with the plan to release their third album as well as the first two albums via the label. On July 26, 2024, a 3CD boxset under the title of Season of Mist Recordings was released. The box set includes the first two albums Afterimage of Autumn and Gu Yan on two CDs as well as the EPs Autumn of Sad Ode, Winter Mirage, The Sacrifice and Resentment in the Ancient Courtyard on the third CD.

== Musical style ==
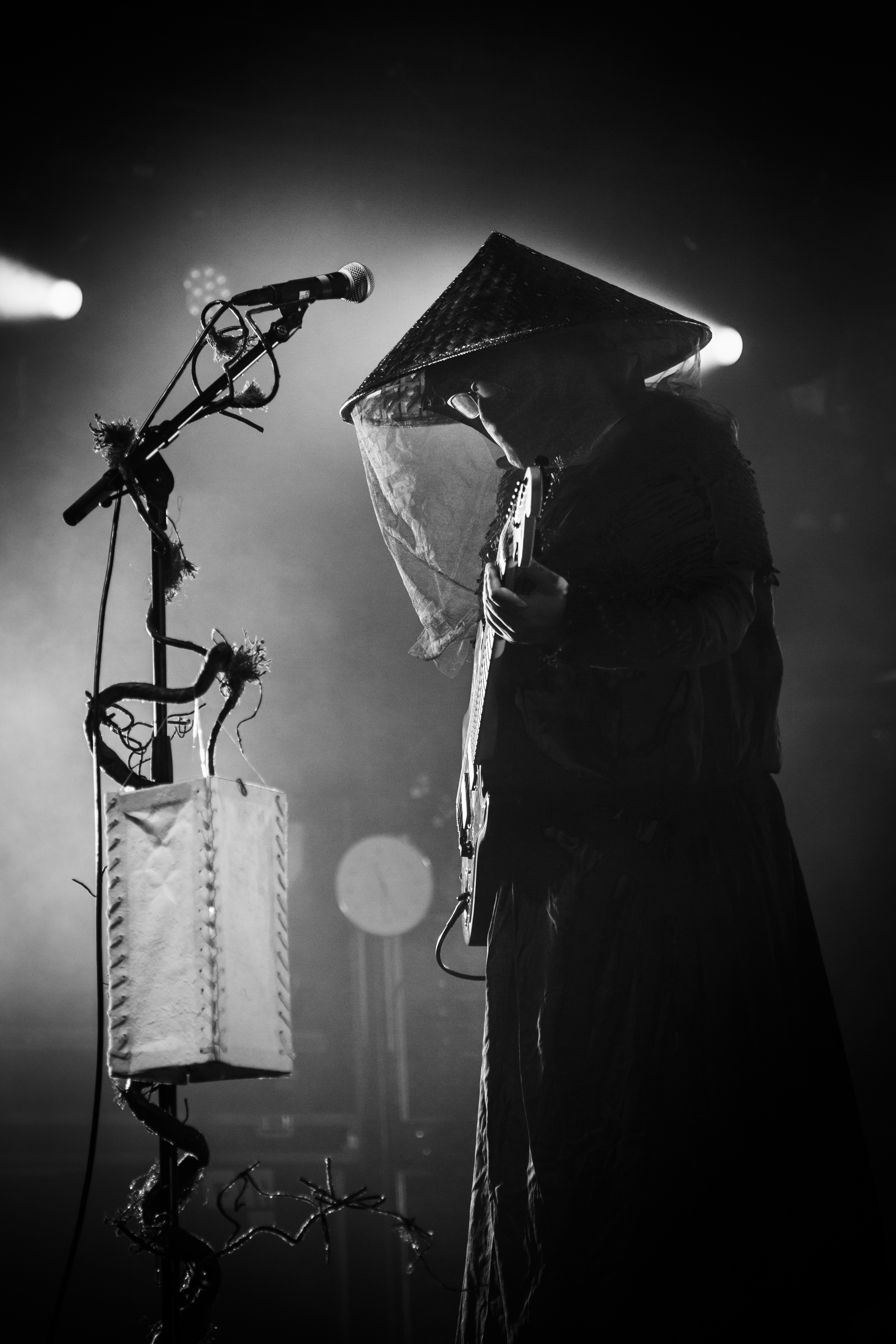
Zuriaake performing at Roadburn Festival, 2018.

Zuriaake plays traditional black metal with Chinese musical influences. In an Interview Bloodsea stated that the group chose to play black metal because no other musical style in metal genre could express what the members of the band wanted to say. Black metal and its views on humanity, nature, polytheism and ancestor worship have a unique philosophical temperament which would fit to the band's music. The musicians believe that simple melodies are easier to understand than complex arrangements and ′using simple melodies to describe something magnificent is a superb way of expressing art.′ Next to the typical instruments used in black metal, the band uses samples of traditional Chinese instruments like temple blocks, handbells and Xun. During the calm and melodic passages the guitars create a traditional sound. Some songs of the band reach more than 20 minutes length. Bloodfire names bands like Bathory, Mayhem, Candlemass, Abigor and Burzum as musical influences. In another interview the band states taking musical inspiration from Mortiis and Ulver as well.

Lyrically the musicians take inspiration on traditional, folkloristic Chinese poems so the songs of Zuriaake are picking up on Chinese legends and Chinese mythology. Furthermore the band stated that the timeline between 771 B.C. and 221 B.C (also particularly known as Warring States period) as their inspiration due to the fact that the publications during that time period showed emotional intensity and despair which would fit to the black metal genre. Due to the fact that China has no Christian origin, anti-Christian or satanic themes are not relevant to the musicians. Instead the musicians focus more on philosophy and Chinese history.

== Stage appearance ==
During concerts the band extensively use fog machines. The band members except the drummer wear black traditional hanfu-like clothing as well as traditional Chinese farmer hats (dǒulì) which cover up the faces of the musicians with the intention of depicting an image of old fishermen. Those farmer hats based on the poem Jiang Xue. The microphone stands are decorated with traditional lanterns and branches. During concerts the members do not wear corpse paint. After each song the band members bow to the audience and make traditional hand gestures to show them respect.

Little information about the members exists. Bloodfire is the sole member of black metal project Yn Gizarm. Members of Zuriaake are also involved in the Chinese atmospheric black metal/dungeon synth project Demogorgon alongside members of Holyarrow and Destruction of Redemption.

== Band name ==
According to English-languaged online magazines and newspapers the band name Zuriaake is a Chinglish portmanteau and means literally ′Lake of buried corpses′. The name is a metaphor for the Chinese poet Qu Yuan who drowned himself due to his hatred for the government. In a Chinese-languaged interview in 2016 the band members stated that the band's name is translateable as Zu, a storm god, as well as (b)uria(l) and (l)ake.

== Discography ==
- 2005: Autumn of Sad Ode — Siming of Louian (Split release with Yn Gizarm, Black Happiness Production, Pest Productions, limited to 300 units)
- 2007: Afterimage of Autumn (Album, Pest Productions)
- 2012: Winter Mirage (EP, Pest Productions, limited to 500 units)
- 2015: Gu Yan (EP, Pest Productions, limited to 200 units)
- 2015: Yao Ji (Single, Nuclear War Now! Productions)
- 2015: Live in Beijing (Live album, Pest Production, limited to 200 units)
- 2015: Gu Yan (Album, Pest Productions)
- 2019: Resentment in the Ancient Courtyard (EP, Pest Productions)
- 2024: Season of Mist Recordings (3CD boxset, Back on Black)
