= Dawn of the End =

Studio album by Runemagick
- Released: 29 August 2007
- Genre: Death metal Doom metal
- Length: 1:02:07
- Label: Aftermath Music

Runemagick chronology
Invocation of Magick (2006)	Dawn of the End (2007)	Evoked From Abysmal Sleep (2018)

Professional ratings
Review scores
Source	Rating
Blabbermouth.net	7.5/10
Metal.de	8/10

Dawn of the End is the tenth album by Runemagick. It was released in 2007 on Aftermath Music.

== Critical reception ==
Powermetal.de recommended the tracks "Chthonic Temple Smoke" and "Retaliation".

== Track listing ==
1. "Dawn of the End" - 5:50
2. "Voyage of Desolation" - 11:37
3. "Chthonic Temple Smoke" - 10:11
4. "Retaliation" - 8:49
5. "Volcano Throne" - 7:37
6. "The Circle" - 4:49
7. "Magus of Fire" - 9:37
8. "Sabbatum ad Infinitum" - 3:37

== Credits ==
- Nicklas "Terror" Rudolfsson - Vocals, Guitar
- Emma Karlsson - Bass
- Daniel Moilanen - Drums
