= Requiem of the Apocalypse =

Studio album by Runemagick
- Released: 2002
- Genre: Death-doom
- Length: 62:33
- Label: Aftermath Music

Runemagick chronology
Resurrection in Blood (1999)	Requiem of the Apocalypse (2002)	Moon of the Chaos Eclipse (2002)

Professional ratings
Review scores
Source	Rating
AllMusic	4.5/5
Blabbermouth	8/10
Metal.de	7/10
Rock Hard	9/10

Requiem of the Apocalypse is the fourth album by Runemagick. It was released in 2002 on Aftermath Music.

== Critical reception ==
In a Blabbermouth review, the album was praised as "great stuff" and described as consisting of "massive tunes that remind you of when Paradise Lost was death metal". Powermetal.de called the album above average. Vampster called the album a huge step in songwriting.

== Track listing ==
1. "Preludium" – 1:01
2. "Temple of Skin" – 6:37
3. "Beyond Life" – 5:11
4. "On Chariots to Hades" – 6:49
5. "Dawn of the Lava Aeon" – 4:18
6. "One Road to Megiddo" – 4:55
7. "Bells of Death" – 2:02
8. "Funeral Caravan" – 6:54
9. "Fields of No Life" – 4:31
10. "Memorandum Melancholia" – 8:13
11. "The Secret Alliance" – 3:37
12. "Requiem of the Apocalypse" – 5:47
13. "Landscape of Souls" – 2:41

== Credits ==
- Nicklas "Terror" Rudolfsson - Vocals, Guitar
- Emma Karlsson - Bass
- Daniel Moilanen - Drums
- Fredrik Johnsson - Guitar
