= On Funeral Wings =

Studio album by Runemagick
- Released: 2004
- Genre: Death metal Doom metal
- Length: 73:51
- Label: Aftermath Music

Runemagick chronology
Darkness Death Doom (2003)	On Funeral Wings (2004)	Envenom (2005)

Professional ratings
Review scores
Source	Rating
AllMusic	3/5
Metal.de	8/10

On Funeral Wings is the seventh album by Runemagick. It was released in 2004 through Aftermath Music.

== Critical reception ==
Powermetal.de recommended the tracks "On Funeral Wings", "Dragon of Doom", "Emperor of the Underworld", and "In a Darkened Tomb".

== Track listing ==
1. "Monolithic Death" – 4:19
2. "Rise of the Second Moon" – 3:30
3. "On Funeral Wings" – 4:36
4. "Dragon of Doom" – 9:31
5. "Hyperion" – 0:49
6. "Ocean Demon" – 6:52
7. "Emperor of the Underworld" – 5:35
8. "Trifid Nebula" – 2:00
9. "The Doomsday Scythe" – 8:19
10. "Riders of Endtime" – 5:38
11. "In a Darkened Tomb" – 8:22
12. "Black Star Abyss" – 8:31
13. "Wizard with the Magick Runes" – 5:47

== Credits ==
- Nicklas Rudolfsson - Vocals, Guitar
- Emma Karlsson - Bass
- Daniel Moilanen - Drums
