= Seeds of Iblis =

Heavy metal band

- Origin: Iraq
- Genres: Black metal
- Years active: 2011–present
- Labels: Armée de la Mort; Hammer of Hate; Unmerciful Death; Pest
- Members: Anahita; Epona; Jebrael; Mohammad
- Past members: Younes; Yousef

Seeds of Iblis is a black metal band presumably from Iraq that started in 2011.

== History ==
Seeds of Iblis was started in 2011 by a female Iraqi black metal musician Anahita, who is also the frontwoman of Janaza which is believed to be the first female black metal artist from Iraq. All pictures presumably portraying the band members have turned out to be fake which led metal music webzine Metalilluminata argue the band's origin as a hoax.

The group consists of bassist/vocalist Anahita, guitarists Epona and Mohammad as well as drummer Jebrael. Former musicians include drummer Younes and guitarist Yousef. It is rumoured that the group consists of two female and two male musicians. The group had troubles finding a label to release their EP but eventually signed a deal with Unmerciful Death Productions.

The first release of the group is an EP entitled Jihad Against Islam which was released via French underground music label Armée de la Mort, followed by another EP in 2012 called The Black Quran released via Hammer of Hate. The band's debut album Anti-Quran Rituals was released in 2013 under Unmerciful Death. After a seven year long period of silence, the group released their second album Morbid Muhammad via Chinese label Pest Productions.

== Musical style ==
The musicians take up anti-Islamic themes and motives. The group takes up some kind of Islamic satanism, some lyrics hail Iblis, a demon in the Quran who is said to have fallen away from God.

== Discography ==
- 2011: Jihad Against Islam (EP, Armée de la Mort)
- 2013: The Black Quran (EP, Hammer of Hate)
- 2013: Anti Quran Rituals (Album, Unmerciful Death Productions)
- 2013: When Muslims Slay Muslims (Single)
- 2020: Morbid Muhammad (Album, Pest Productions)
