= I Don't Want to See You in Heaven =

Studio album by the Callous Daoboys
- Released: May 16, 2025
- Genres: Mathcore; metalcore; post-hardcore; experimental rock
- Length: 57:06
- Label: MNRK Heavy

The Callous Daoboys chronology
God Smiles Upon the Callous Daoboys (2023)	I Don't Want to See You in Heaven (2025)

Singles from I Don't Want to See You in Heaven
- 1. "Two-Headed Trout/The Demon of Unreality Limping Like a Dog" Released: February 12, 2025; 2. "Lemon" Released: March 14, 2025; 3. "Distracted by the Mona Lisa" Released: April 11, 2025

I Don't Want to See You in Heaven is the third lbum by the American mathcore band the Callous Daoboys. It was released on May 16, 2025, by MNRK Heavy. The band released "Two-Headed Trout" and "The Demon of Unreality Limping Like a Dog" as singles on February 12, 2025.

== Reception ==
Professional ratings
Review scores
Source	Rating
Distorted Sound	10/10 stars
Dork	4/5 stars
The Guardian	4/5 stars
Kerrang!	4/5 stars
Metal Hammer	8/10 stars
Sputnikmusic	4.5/5

Stephen Hill of Metal Hammer remarked, "This is an album that is clearly going out of its way to fuck with its listener," rating the album eight out of ten. Distorted Sound gave the album a ten-out-of-ten rating, noting "While it might be a monument to the anxieties and contradictions inherent to being in a critically-acclaimed band in a very niche scene there's nothing remotely close to failure on I Don't Want To See You In Heaven."

Tyler White of Sputnikmusic rated the album 4.5 out of five, noting the album "doesn't need an identity attached; the collection is already emotional and personal on its own." The Guardian assigned a four-star rating to the album and described it as "a framing device that allows vocalist Carson Pace to turn over mid-20s anxieties at a safe remove."

Dork, rating the album four out of five, commented, "I Don't Want To See You In Heaven isn't just a record – it's a fever dream you'll want to return to again and again." Kerrang!, rating the album four out of five and referring to it as a "personal record", remarked, "Despite this abundance of creativity, I Don't Want To See You In Heaven doesn't have its eyes facing outwards at the world around us, unlike its predecessor."

== Track listing ==
I Don't Want to See You in Heaven track listing
No.	Title	Writer(s)	Length
1.	"I. Collection of Forgotten Dreams"	Carson Pace	2:13
2.	"Schizophrenia Legacy"	Pace	4:53
3.	"Full Moon Guidance"	Pace; Daniel Hodsdon	3:59
4.	"Two-Headed Trout"	Pace	3:52
5.	"Tears on Lambo Leather" (featuring Adam Easterling)	Pace; Jackson Buckalew	3:47
6.	"Lemon"	Pace	3:51
7.	"Body Horror for Birds" (featuring 1st Vows)	Pace; Ryan Hunter	5:37
8.	"The Demon of Unreality Limping Like a Dog"	Pace	3:45
9.	"Idiot Temptation Force"	Pace	3:56
10.	"Douchebag Safari"	Pace	3:26
11.	"Distracted by the Mona Lisa"	Pace; Buckalew	3:34
12.	"II. Opt Out"	Pace	2:25
13.	"III. Country Song in Reverse" (featuring Low Before the Breeze)	Pace	11:48
Total length:			57:06

== Personnel ==
Credits adapted from Bandcamp and Tidal.

=== The Callous Daoboys ===
- Jackie Buckalew – bass, backing vocals
- Maddie Caffrey – guitars
- Amber Christman – violin
- Matthew Hague – drums, backing vocals
- Daniel Hodsdon – guitars, backing vocals
- Carson Pace – lead vocals, synthesizers, production (all tracks); engineering (track 1)

=== Additional personnel ===
- Dom Maduri – production, mixing, engineering
- Rich Castillo – saxophone (tracks 1, 2, 7)
- Justin Young – narration (tracks 1, 12)
- Jake Howard – additional production (tracks 1, 3, 10, 11, 12), engineering (1)
- Adam Easterling – guest vocals (track 5)
- Tyler Syphertt – additional vocals (track 6)
- Ryan Hunter – guest vocals (track 7)
- Dawson Beck – backing vocals (track 7)
- Allan Romero – trumpets, trombones, saxophone (tracks 9, 13)
- Andrew Spann – guest vocals (track 13)

== Charts ==
Chart performance for I Don't Want to See You in Heaven
Chart (2025)	Peak position
US Top Album Sales (Billboard)	40
