= Resurrection in Blood =

Studio album by Runemagick
- Released: September 13, 2000
- Genre: Death metal Doom metal
- Length: 50:11
- Label: Century Media
- Producer: Niclas Rudolfson; Andy LaRocque

Runemagick chronology
| Enter the Realm of Death (1998) | Resurrection in Blood (2000) | Requiem of the Apocalypse (2002) |

Professional ratings
Review scores
| Source | Rating |
|---|---|
| AllMusic | 3/5 |
| Metal.de | 6/10 |
| Rock Hard | 6/10 |

Resurrection in Blood is the third album by Runemagick released in 2000 on Century Media.

== Critical reception ==
Powermetal.de gave a positive review, highlighting the songs “Death Collector”, “Lord of the Grave” and “Return of the Reaper” and said there are no weak tracks on the album. Vampster recommended the tracks "Resurrection in Blood" and "Dominion of the Necrogods".

== Track listing ==
1. "Resurrection of the Dark Lord" – 0:30
2. "Reborn in Necromancy" – 5:15
3. "Death Collector" – 3:57
4. "Dark Dead Earth" – 4:54
5. "Lord of the Grave" – 5:54
6. "Choir of Hades (Intro)" – 0:31
7. "Resurrection in Blood" – 6:47
8. "Hail Death" – 4:34
9. "Dominion of the Necrogods" – 5:09
10. "Demonstrosity" – 6:10
11. "The Gates of Hades (Intro)" – 0:55
12. "Return of the Reaper" – 4:15
13. "Celebration of Death (Outro)" – 1:18

== Credits ==
- Nicklas "Terror" Rudolfsson - Vocals, Guitar, Drums, Bass, Keyboards
- Fredrik Johnsson - Guitar
- Billy Mellström - Keyboards
- Axel Hermann - Cover artwork
