= Sounds of Loss =

2017 studio album by Orthodox

Studio album by Orthodox TN
- Released: May 26, 2017
- Studios: Iceman Studios (West Palm Beach, Florida): Baker Audio; 4115 Studios (Nashville, Tennessee)
- Genres: Metalcore, nu metal
- Length: 34:57
- Label: Unbeaten Records
- Producer: Daniel Colombo

Orthodox TN chronology
split EP w/Breaking Wheel (2015)	Sounds of Loss (2017)	Let It Take Its Course (2020)

Sounds of Loss is the second studio album by the American metalcore band Orthodox, released on May 26, 2017 through Unbeaten Records. It is the only record to be recorded by the band as a duo, as Tyler Williams (who handled guitars and bass) would leave the band to join Canadian melodic hardcore band Counterparts.

The album presents a shift in sound for the band, taking influence from the nu-metal of Korn, Slipknot, and System of a Down, instead of the typical hardcore sound on At the End of My Wit and Give Me a Reason. This is characterized in Adam Easterling's vocal style and drumming and Williams's guitar work on songs like "The Anticipation", "Panic", and "Second Best". The album also has four featured vocals, from Zachary Hatfield of Left Behind, Vincente Void (formerly of Darke Complex, currently manager of Omerta), and Bryan Garris and Isaac Hale from Knocked Loose.

== Track listing ==
All tracks are written by Adam Easterling and Tyler Williams.

No.	Title	Length
1.	"The Anticipation"	2:31
2.	"Panic"	2:49
3.	"Second Best"	2:29
4.	"I'm Scared of You"	3:56
5.	"Waiting"	1:11
6.	"In the Dark"	3:12
7.	"Dementia"	3:15
8.	"Resent Me"	2:57
9.	"Sounds of Loss"	2:53
10.	"Fallen Behind"	4:47
11.	"The Approach"	1:58
12.	"The Taking"	2:53
Total length:		34:57

== Personnel ==
Orthodox

- Adam Easterling - drums, vocals
- Tyler Williams - guitars, bass, vocals

Additional musicians

- Zachary Hatfield - vocals (track 2)
- Vincente Void - vocals (track 3)
- Bryan Garris - vocals (track 6)
- Isaac Hale - vocals (track 6)

Production

- Daniel Colombo - recording, mixing, mastering
- David Hobbs - vocal tracking
- Tate Mercer - vocal tracking
