= Let It Take Its Course =

Studio album by Orthodox TN
- Released: February 7, 2020
- Studio: Iceman Studios (West Palm Beach, Florida)
- Genre: Metalcore, nu metal
- Length: 30:06
- Label: Unbeaten Records
- Producer: Daniel Colombo

Orthodox TN chronology
Sounds of Loss (2017)	Let It Take Its Course (2020)	Learning to Dissolve (2022)

Singles from Let It Take Its Course
- 1. "I Can Show You God" Released: September 12, 2019; 2. "Let It Take its Course" Released: November 7, 2019; 3. "Look at Me" Released: January 23, 2020

Let It Take Its Course is the third studio album by American metalcore band Orthodox, released on February 7, 2020, through Unbeaten Records. It is the first Orthodox album since End Of My Wit to feature a full lineup, with vocalist Adam Easterling, Austin Evans on guitar, Shiloh Krebs on bass, and Mike White on drums.

== Composition ==
=== Music ===
Adam Easterling worked with producer Daniel Colombo to map out the songs, singing his ideas for guitar riffs while Colombo played them. With 5-6 songs written, Easterling invited Austin Evans to help with playing guitar. Evans wrote the guitar parts for "I Can Show You God", and through encouragement from Easterling, wrote guitar for "Look at Me", "Why Are You Here?", and "Cut". He played an ESP LTD M-Series with Seymour Duncan Black Winter humbuckers installed, going through a Fortin Meshuggah amplifier head on the left side, and a Peavey 5150 amplifier head on the right side.

According to Evans, pedals of Colombo's used on the album were overdrive, reverb, delay, and "either a phaser or a chorus pedal."

At the end of the song "Cut", a soft, fading clean guitar was recorded by freelance session guitarist Chris Condon, who plays guitar for Billy Ray Cyrus.

Mike White was enlisted to record drums for the record. The instrumentals were finished in a week.

=== Lyrical themes ===
According to Easterling, Let It Take its Course is a "love story about hatred", explaining a desire to severely harm the abuser of a loved one, yet being afraid of said loved one seeing you as capable of doing so.

"One thing that's kind of always stuck out to me, and this is what the overall theme of the record is, is the knowing that someone has deeply hurt someone you love, whether any sort of abuse from verbal to physical or sexual, anything along those lines. It's just the feeling of obsession that takes over when you want to hurt that person back. But also the fear of knowing that the person you love will probably see you differently if they know that you're capable of doing what was done to them. That's kind of what the overall theme of the record is. The start of the record is the initial birth of the thought where you're like, OK, this is what's going on in my head. By the end of it it's you giving into the obsession and carrying out the act."

- Easterling, ORTHODOX Talk Aggressive Album Let It Take Its Course

This is further expressed in the lyrics of "Cut" and "Wrongs":

- "I'm terrified of the wrongs I'd do for you / Because there's no wrong I wouldn't do"

Certain themes are referenced from Sounds of Loss, with lyrics being taken from older songs and put in a new context. The album title and its title track, along with the first song of the album, "Remorse", are all taken from the bridge of "Panic":

- "Remorse! Just let it take its course" ~ "Panic", from Sounds of Loss (2017)

"Why Are You Here?" and "Then it Ends" both contain lyrics referencing "push, then pull" from the outro of "The Anticipation":

- "Push, then pull, then push, then pull, then push, then pull, then push, then pull, then..." ~ "The Anticipation" from Sounds of Loss, (2017)

This is further emphasized in "Why Are You Here":

- "Push me, then pull me, then push me, then pull me back in / Pull me, then push me"

== Track listing ==
All tracks are written by Orthodox. All lyrics by Easterling.

No.	Title	Length
1.	"Remorse"	1:02
2.	"Obsinity"	2:35
3.	"Why Are You Here?"	3:30
4.	"Leave"	2:22
5.	"I Can Show You God"	2:54
6.	"Cut"	3:44
7.	"Look At Me"	2:49
8.	"Then It Ends"	3:05
9.	"Let it Take Its Course"	2:44
10.	"The Presence"	3:13
11.	"Wrongs"	2:21
Total length:		30:06

== Personnel ==
=== Orthodox ===
- Adam Easterling - vocals
- Austin Evans - guitars
- Shiloh Krebs - bass guitar
- Mike White - drums

=== Production ===
- Daniel Colombo - production, mixing, mastering
- Chris Condon - engineering, additional guitar (track 6)
