= Lotus (Within Destruction album) =

Studio album by Within Destruction
- Released: 30 September 2022
- Genres: Metalcore; deathcore
- Length: 41:08
- Label: Ultra Heavy
- Producer: Federico Ascari

Within Destruction chronology
| Yōkai (2020) | Lotus (2022) | Animetal (2025) |

Singles from Animetal
- 1. "Nightmare" Released: 14 April 2022; 2. "Survival" Released: 22 June 2022; 3. "Scars" Released: 29 July 2022; 4. "Toxic" Released: 23 September 2022

Lotus is the fifth studio album by Slovenian metalcore band Within Destruction, released on 30 September 2022 via Ultra Heavy Records. The album continues the band's transition from deathcore to anime-influenced metalcore. Music videos were released for the songs "Nightmare" and "Toxic".

== Track listing ==
1. "Lotus" – 3:33
2. "Toxic" – 3:34
3. "Nightmare" – 3:46
4. "Survival" – 3:20
5. "Scars" – 3:42
6. "Revenge" – 3:13
7. "Dying World" (featuring Lil Lotus) – 3:31
8. "Dehumanized" – 3:13
9. "Illusions" – 3:41
10. "Neo-Yakuza" – 3:11
11. "P.O.P." – 3:14
12. "Ultima" – 3:10

== Personnel ==
- Rok Rupnik – vocals
- Howard Fang – guitars, bass
- Luka Vezzosi – drums
