= Envenom =

Studio album by Runemagick
- Released: 2005
- Genre: Death metal Doom metal
- Length: 61:14
- Label: Aftermath Music

Runemagick chronology
On Funeral Wings (2004)	Envenom (2005)	Invocation of Magick (2006)

Envenom is the eighth album by Runemagick. It was released as a limited edition of 1,000 hand-numbered digipaks only in 2005 through Aftermath Music.

The album was rated an 8 out of 10 by Metal.de. Powermetal.de recommended the track "Vultures". Vampster said the album is not groundbreaking but successful in terms of songwriting.

== Track listing ==
1. "Vultures" – 12:17
2. "Envenom (Laterna Magica)" – 14:51
3. "Nebulous" – 8:23
4. "Omnivore (Sin Eater)" – 11:22
5. "Maelstrom" – 14:22

== Credits ==
- Nicklas "Terror" Rudolfsson - Vocals, Guitar
- Emma Karlsson - Bass
- Daniel Moilanen - Drums
