= Enter the Realm of Death =

Studio album by Runemagick
- Released: 1999
- Genre: Death metal Doom metal
- Length: 54:02
- Label: Century Media
- Producer: Niklas Rudolfson; Andy LaRocque

Runemagick chronology
The Supreme Force of Eternity (1998)	Enter the Realm of Death (1999)	Resurrection in Blood (2000)

Professional ratings
Review scores
Source	Rating
Rock Hard	8.5/10

Enter the Realm of Death is the second album by Runemagick. It was released in Century Media in 1999.

== Reception ==
The album received a five-out-of-ten rating from Chronicles of Chaos. Vampster called it a great album and recommended the track "Abyss of Desolation".

== Track listing ==
1. "Hymn of Darkness (Intro)" – 0:58
2. "Enter the Realm Of Death" – 6:09
3. "Longing for Hades" – 5:01
4. "Dwellers beyond Obscurity" – 5:08
5. "Abyss of Desolation" – 5:20
6. "Beyond (The Horizons End...)" – 6:33
7. "Dethrone the Flesh" – 4:33
8. "The Portal of Doom" – 1:31
9. "Dreamvoid Serpent" – 3:56
10. "The Call of Tombs" – 5:53
11. "Lightworld Damnation" – 4:08
12. "Dark Necroshadows" – 4:53
13. "The Malicious Paradise" * (cover of Tiamat)

*Not on all versions

== Credits ==
- Nicklas "Terror" Rudolfsson - vocals, guitar, drums, keyboards, bass
- Fredrik Johnsson - bass, acoustic guitars
