= Animetal (album) =

Studio album by Within Destruction
- Released: 11 April 2025
- Genre: Nu metal; metalcore
- Length: 40:25
- Label: Sumerian

Within Destruction chronology
| Lotus (2022) | Animetal (2025) |

Singles from Animetal
- 1. "Demon Child" Released: 28 August 2024; 2. "Kanashibari" Released: 13 November 2024; 3. "Cybergirl" Released: 29 January 2025; 4. "Incomplete" Released: 3 March 2025; 5. "Hide & Sick" Released: 13 April 2025

Professional ratings
Review scores
| Source | Rating |
|---|---|
| Blabbermouth.net | 8.5/10 |
| Boolin Tunes | 8/10 |
| Chaoszine | 3.5/5 |
| Kerrang! | 4/5 |
| Noizze | 7/10 |
| Wall of Sound | 9/10 |

Animetal is the sixth studio album by Slovenian nu metalcore band Within Destruction, released on 11 April 2025 via Sumerian Records. The album continues the band's nu metal/electronic influences and Japanese themes. In support of the album, the band went on a headline tour in Europe, Australia and Asia.

== Track listing ==
1. "Animetal" – 3:54
2. "Demon Child" – 2:55
3. "Kanashibari" – 3:30
4. "Bitter Embrace" – 3:34
5. "Fate // Separate" – 3:02
6. "Cybergirl" – 3:39
7. "Incomplete" – 3:49
8. "Stay 4ever" – 3:25
9. "Automaton" – 3:06
10. "Hide & Sick" – 3:34
11. "Torment" – 3:30
12. "A Love That Slowly Died" – 2:30

== Personnel ==
- Rok Rupnik – harsh vocals
- Howard Fang – guitars, bass, clean vocals
- Luka Vezzosi – drums
