= Invocation of Magick =

Studio album by Runemagick
- Released: February 2006
- Genre: Death metal Doom metal
- Length: 70:00
- Label: Aftermath Music

Runemagick chronology
Black Magick Sorceress (2004)	Invocation of Magick (2006)	Dawn of the End (2007)

Professional ratings
Review scores
Source	Rating
Metal.de	8/10
Rock Hard	8.5/10

Invocation of Magick is the ninth album by Runemagick. It was released in 999 copies in 2005.

== Critical reception ==
Powermetal.de recommended the tracks "Black Magick Sorceress" and "Fisher of Souls".

== Track listing ==
No.	Title	Length
1.	"Preludium Apocalypsis"	4:47
2.	"Invocation of Doom Runes"	10:35
3.	"Black Magick Sorceress"	14:12
4.	"Fisher of Souls"	10:28
5.	"Lower Worlds"	1:02
6.	"The Devils (Imperium Magnum Infernalis)"	9:29
7.	"Conjuration of the Black Shape"	7:00
8.	"Witchcraft Gateways"	12:22
Total length:		69:55

Tracks 7 and 8 are bonus songs on the digipak edition.

== Personnel ==
- Nicklas "Terror" Rudolfsson - Vocals, Guitar
- Emma Karlsson - Bass
- Daniel Moilanen - Drums
