= Agriculture (band) =

American black metal band

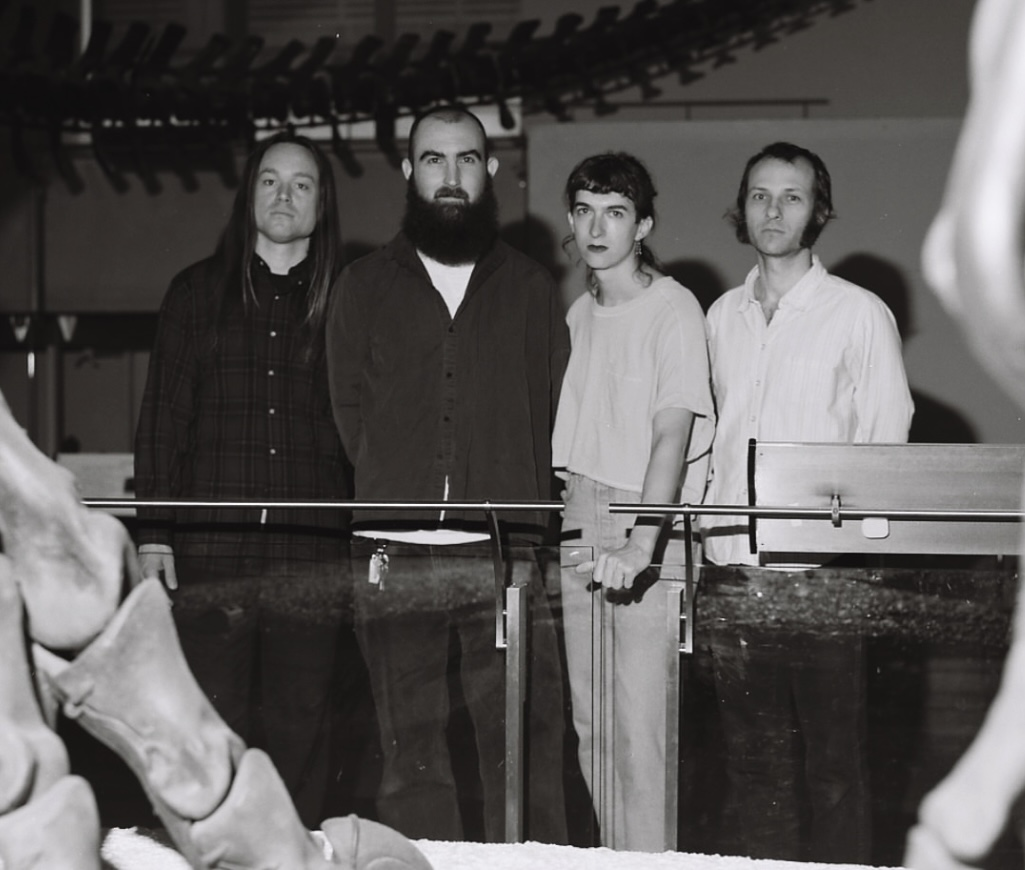
- Agriculture in 2025

Background information
- Origin: Los Angeles, California, U.S.
- Genres: post-black metal; blackgaze; Black metal
- Years active: 2021–present
- Label: The Flenser
- Members: Leah B. Levinson; Kern Haug; Richard Chowenhill; Dan Meyer

Agriculture is a post-black metal band from Los Angeles. They self-released their EP The Circle Chant in 2022 before signing to The Flenser in 2023, through which they have released two albums and an additional EP. Marko Djurdjić of Exclaim! called them "black metal's most forward-thinking band." The band consists of vocalist/bassist Leah Levinson, drummer Kern Haug, guitarist Richard Chowenhill, and vocalist/guitarist Dan Meyer.

== Musical style and influences ==
The band self-categorizes their music as "ecstatic black metal." According to Marko Djurdjić of Exclaim: "The music r[i]ses, trembling in optimism and memory, even when it's rooted in adversity, need and tumult. It's awash in noise and devastation, but from the sound and the fury, it purifies. There is change and growth, acceptance and celebration. There is love." The band's music draws influence from Bob Dylan, Lou Reed and Zen Buddhism.

=== Instruments ===
In an October 2025 feature with Guitar World, Meyer shared that he plays a custom guitar made for him as a wedding present by the father of one of his guitar students: "It has a slimmer SG neck on a Jazzmaster-style body, minus all the bells and whistles up the top. The real trick is that it’s fitted with Thunderbird bass pickups.” In the same feature, Chowenhill stated that he plays an EVH Wolfgang "fitted with custom overwound pickups. They’re a little bit hotter so they really scream, and they fill the spectrum nicely with Dan’s bass pickups. Bassist Levinson played a Music Man Sabre for studio recording and an Ibanez while touring.

== Discography ==
=== Studio albums ===
- Agriculture (2023)
- The Spiritual Sound (2025)

=== Extended plays ===
- The Circle Chant (2022)
- Living Is Easy (2024)

=== Live albums ===
- The Spiritual Sound, Live in Europe 2026 (2026)
