= The Callous Daoboys =

American musical artist

- Origin: Atlanta, Georgia
- Genres: Mathcore, emo, nu metal
- Years active: 2016–present
- Label: MNRK Heavy
- Members: Carson "Big Animal" Pace; Maddie “El Perro” Caffrey; Amber “The Mind” Christman; Jackie “Clancy” Buckalew; Daniel "Dip" Hodsdon; Matthew "Marty" Hague

The Callous Daoboys are an American mathcore band from Atlanta, Georgia. Their name is a spoonerism of the football team the Dallas Cowboys.

== History ==
=== My Dixie Wrecked and Animal Tetris (2016–2017) ===
The Callous Daoboys released their debut EP, titled My Dixie Wrecked, on April 1, 2017. On December 1 of that same year, the band released their second EP, Animal Tetris. This was the last release to contain the band's original lineup.

=== Die on Mars (2018–2022) ===
In early 2018, drummer Alex Jerral and bassist Claire Darling left the band; Sam Williamson joined as the band's new drummer, and Jackie Buckalew as the bassist. On June 21, 2019, the band released their debut studio album, Die on Mars, under Dark Trail Records. Reception to the album was very positive, and gained a lot of attention for the band. Caleb Newton of Captured Howls described the album as "...an immersive experience that's far out ahead of... any kind of conventional songwriting."

=== MNRK Music Group and Celebrity Therapist (2022–2025) ===
On March 19, 2022, The Callous Daoboys released a single titled "A Brief Article Regarding Time Loops", and announced that they were signing to MNRK Music Group for the release of an upcoming second studio album. Their second album, Celebrity Therapist, was released on September 2, 2022.

=== I Don't Want to See You in Heaven (2025-present) ===
On January 2, 2024, the band confirmed that they'll be heading into the studio later that year with Gatherers drummer Adam Cichocki to record their third full-length album, later announced under the title of I Don't Want to See You in Heaven. The album was released on May 16, 2025.

On April 2nd, 2026, the band released a single titled "Gigantic Parasite Tongue", which vocalist Carson Pace confirmed on Twitter would be part of a bigger project. In the same post, he said he was "20% into writing LP4".

== Musical style ==
The band have been described as a mixture of mathcore and emo, and have referred to themselves as a nu metal band, citing the Dillinger Escape Plan, Botch, Korn, Slipknot, and Linkin Park as their biggest influences.

== Members ==
=== Current members ===
- Carson Pace – vocals (2016–present)
- Maddie Caffrey – guitars (2016–present)
- Amber Christman – violin (2016–present)
- Jackie Buckalew – bass (2018–present)
- Daniel Hodsdon – guitars (2022–present)
- Matthew Hague – drums (2022–present)

=== Past members ===
- Alex Jerral – drums (2016–2018)
- Claire Darling – bass (2016–2018)
- Adam Collins – guitars (2016–2022)
- Sam Williamson – drums (2018–2022)
- Whitney Jordan – keyboards (2019–2021)
- Abby Sherman – keyboards (2021–2022)

== Discography ==
=== Studio albums ===
- Die on Mars (2019)
- Celebrity Therapist (2022)
- I Don't Want to See You in Heaven (2025)

=== EPs ===
- My Dixie Wrecked (2017)
- Animal Tetris (2017)
- God Smiles Upon the Callous Daoboys (2023)

=== Singles ===
- The Great Multi-Stage Rocket Robbery (2018)
- Gigantic Parasite Tongue (2026)
- Watching Us Kiss (2026)
