= The Spiritual Sound =

Studio album by Agriculture
- Released: October 3, 2025
- Genre: Black metal
- Length: 43:59
- Label: The Flenser
- Producers: Richard Chowenhill; Dan Meyer; Leah B. Levinson; Kern Haug

Agriculture chronology
Living Is Easy (2024)	The Spiritual Sound (2025)

Singles from The Spiritual Sound
- 1. "Bodhidharma" Released: July 20, 2025; 2. "The Weight" Released: August 13, 2025; 3. "Dan's Love Song" Released: September 17, 2025; 4. "My Garden" Released: October 1, 2025

The Spiritual Sound is the second studio album by the American black metal band Agriculture. It was released on October 3, 2025, via The Flenser in cassette, LP, CD and digital formats.

== Background ==
Incorporating elements of post-hardcore, sludge metal, post-metal, thrash metal, blackgaze, and progressive metal, the album consists of ten songs with a total runtime of approximately forty-four minutes. It was preceded by the band's 2024 EP, Living Is Easy. The band described the work as "an album about the really fundamental human experiences of suffering, joy, and love." Produced by the group, the album was recorded and mixed by guitarist Richard Chowenhill.

"Bodhidharma" was released the lead single on July 20, 2025. It was followed by the second single, "The Weight", on August 13, 2025, the third single, "Dan's Love Song", on September 17, 2025, and the fourth and final single, "My Garden", on October 1, 2025.

== Critical reception ==
Professional ratings
Aggregate scores
Source	Rating
AnyDecentMusic?	8.5/10
Metacritic	87/100
Review scores
Source	Rating
Exclaim!	9/10
The Guardian	5/5 stars
Kerrang	4/5
Paste	8.6/10
Pitchfork	8.0/10
Sputnikmusic	4.2/5
Under the Radar	9/10 stars

On Metacritic, which assigns a normalized score out of 100 to ratings from mainstream publications, the album received a weighted mean score of 87 based on nine reviews, indicating "universal acclaim".

Pitchfork proclaimed The Spiritual Sound to be "one of 2025’s most daring metal albums" and praised Agriculture as "the type of band who can shapeshift with each song while maintaining a distinct personality."

Ryan P of Sputnikmusic assigned the album a rating of 4.2 and commented, "This album might not flow as perfectly as others or have one consistent style, but what it does have is riffs, balls and atmosphere aplenty, and when creating music based in black metal, it doesn't get any better than that."

In a review for Paste, Matt Mitchell rated it 8.6, calling it "the best metal album of the year," and stating "The Spiritual Sound's textural versatility finds full consciousness in music that blasts with numbing intensity until it's reborn into vibrance." Giving it a rating of nine, Marko Djurdjić of Exclaim! remarked, "Confrontational yet embracing, The Spiritual Sound wraps you in screams and distortion, pummelling while blanketing, devastating amidst the uplift."

In a 9/10 review for Under the Radar, Marc Abbott referred to the album as "a work of duality, melding the diverse—yet complimentary—approaches of songwriters Leah Levinson and Dan Meyer" and "a record of two halves, the first side assaulting the senses, the second offering a more grounded and philosophical experience." The album received a five-star rating from The Guardian's Ben Beaumont-Thomas, who opined, "Black metal melodies can often be either nonexistent or overly fussy, but Agriculture's riffs and hooks are bright and original, and closer 'the Reply' even recalls a much heavier Radiohead."

The Fader reviewer Raphael Helfand observed, "the new record juxtaposes long passages of high-octane chaos with moments of striking tenderness," while The Quietus writer Jared Dix stated, "It's consistently thrilling and the more reflective moments feel of a piece with the concentrated blasts of soaring metal." Kerrang!'s Sam Law gave the album a rating of four, describing it as "a fathomless pool worth hurling yourself into, a shimmering, shattering new landmark on heavy music's mind-expanding outer limits."

=== Year-end lists ===
Publication	List	Rank
Beats Per Minute	The Top 50 Albums of 2025	6
Treble	The 50 Best Albums of 2025	6
The Quietus	Albums of the Year 2025	7
BrooklynVegan	50 Best Albums of 2025	10
Stereogum	The 50 Best Albums of 2025	20
Exclaim!	50 Best Albums of 2025	21
Metal Hammer	The 50 Best Albums of 2025	27
Flood Magazine	The Best Albums of 2025	29
The Needle Drop	Top 50 Albums of 2025	29
Decibel	Top 40 Albums of 2025	32
Paste	The 50 Best Albums of 2025	41

== Track listing ==
All lyrics are written by Dan Meyer and Leah B. Levinson; all music is composed by Meyer, Levinson, Richard Chowenhill, and Kern Haug.

The Spiritual Sound track listing
No.	Title	Length
1.	"My Garden"	5:12
2.	"Flea"	3:55
3.	"Micah (5:15 am)"	4:21
4.	"The Weight"	5:43
5.	"Serenity"	3:07
6.	"The Spiritual Sound"	0:28
7.	"Dan's Love Song"	4:51
8.	"Bodhidharma"	6:23
9.	"Hallelujah"	3:30
10.	"The Reply"	6:29
Total length:		43:59

== Personnel ==
Credits adapted from the album's liner notes.

=== Agriculture ===
- Dan Meyer – guitar, vocals, production
- Leah B. Levinson – bass, vocals, production, art direction, cover design
- Richard Chowenhill – guitar, production, engineering, mixing, mastering
- Kern Haug – drums, production

=== Additional contributors ===
- Emma Ruth Rundle – guest vocals on "The Reply"
- Adam Hirsch – engineering on "My Garden", "Flea", "The Weight" "Serenity", and "The Reply"
- Colin Knight – engineering on "Micah (5:15am)", "Bodhidharma", and "Hallelujah"
- A.L.N. – additional engineering on "The Reply"
- Olivia Crumm – photography
- Suzanne Yeremyan – layout

== Charts ==
Chart performance for The Spiritual Sound
Chart (2025)	Peak position
UK Album Downloads (Official Charts)	22
