= Rainbows Are Free =

US musical group

- Also known as: RAF, Rainbows
- Origin: Norman, Oklahoma, Southern United States
- Genres: Heavy metal Stoner metal Doom metal
- Members: Brandon Kistler; Richie Tarver; Joey Powell; Bobby Onspaugh; Jason Smith; Josh Elam
- Past members: Justin Gallas; Lucas Watson; Chad Hogue
- Website: http://www.rainbowsarefree.com

Rainbows Are Free is an American heavy psych sextet formed in Norman, Oklahoma in 2007. The current lineup consists of founding members Brandon Kistler, Richie Tarver, and Joey Powell, joined by Jason Smith, Bobby Onspaugh, and Josh Elam.

== Biography ==
RAF formed in late 2007 as the conglomerate of several long-time heavy rock bands from Norman, OK. In February 2008, RAF self-released an eponymous demo EP. A year later they began work on an album, Believers In Medicine, which was released in April 2010 on Guestroom Records Records (GRR). They followed up with their second album on GRR in 2014 with the release of Waves Ahead of the Ocean, which saw international distribution by Cargo Records UK. All three releases were recorded at the Bell Labs recording studio (engineered and mixed by Trent Bell of Chainsaw Kittens fame) in Norman, Oklahoma.

The release of the band's third album, Head Pains, on Italian label Argonauta Records (Arenzano, GE) with vinyl support from Horton Records (Tulsa, OK, US), has firmly established the band as a mainstay of underground heaviness, while further exhibiting the band's unique voice—setting them apart from contemporaries of heavy psychedelic, doom, and stoner rock, with whom they have shared the stage (High on Fire, Dead Meadow, St. Vitus, The Sword, Big Business, Pallbearer, and Kylesac).

Often appearing in costumed stage dress, the band, fronted by the soaring and snarling nigh seven-foot cyclone of weirdness that is Brandon Kistler, continues to shock and amaze fans by introducing an element of good- humored theatrics to accompany their live sonic assault. This is achieved in no small part due to the guitar prowess and songwriting of Richie Tarver, joined by the ambient soundscapes of Joey Powell on rhythm guitar, and the thunderous low end of Jason Smith on bass, and Bobby Onspaugh on drums.

Rainbows Are Free continue to bring their unique brand of psychedelic heaviness on tour as they support the release of Head Pains released in late 2019.

== Discography ==
- Rainbows are Free - Self Titled EP (self-released) 2008
- Believers in Medicine (Guestroom Records Records) 2010
- Waves Ahead of the Ocean (Guestroom Records Records) 2014
- Head Pains (Argonauta Records, Horton Records) 2019
- Heavy Petal Music (Ripple Music) 2023
- Silver and Gold (Ripple Music) 2025
