= Runemagick =

Swedish death/doom metal band

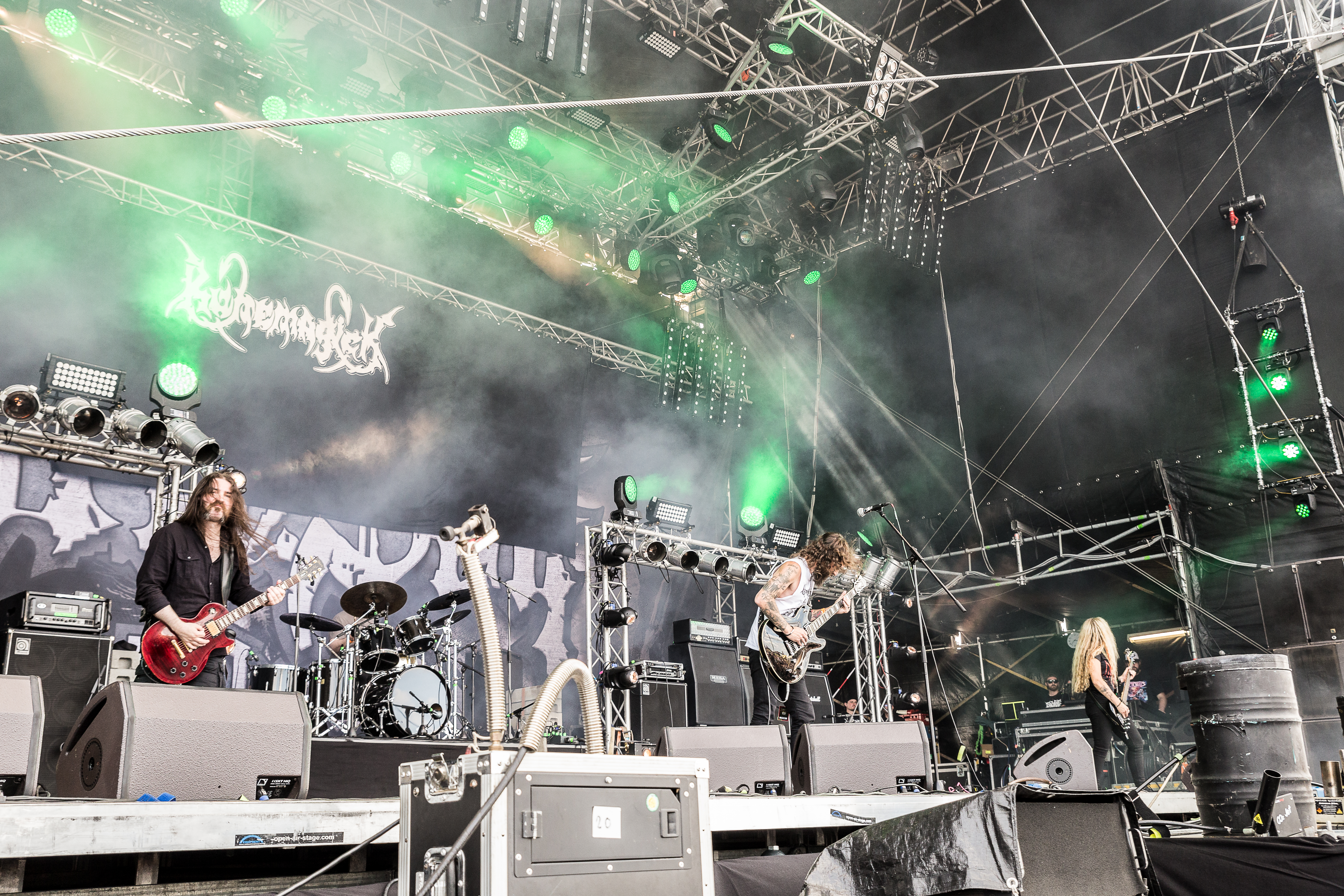
- Runemagick in 2019

Background information
- Also known as: Desiderius, Runemagic
- Origin: Gothenburg, Sweden
- Genre: Death-doom
- Years active: 1990–1993; 1997–2007; 2017–present
- Labels: Century Media, Aftermath
- Website: runemagick.se

Runemagick is a Swedish death/doom metal band formed in 1990. Started by Nicklas "Terror" Rudolfsson as Desiderius, then Runemagic, the band consisted only of Rudolfsson until Robert "Reaper" Pehrsson joined. Originally death metal, they later incorporated doom metal influences inspired by Bathory, Treblinka/Tiamat, Celtic Frost, Nihilist/Entombed, and Candlemass.

After a few demos, the band fell apart in 1993. Rudolfsson restored Runemagic in 1997 with guitarist Fredrik Johnsson, bassist Peter Palmdahl and an added the "k" to the name (see also magick). They recorded a rehearsal demo with Rudolfsson on drums and sent it to Century Media Records, which signed them to a three-album deal. After many line-up changes, in 2000, the band left Century Media and signed to Norwegian label Aftermath Music.

After the album Dawn of the End (2007), the band went into a long hiatus but resumed in 2017. In 2018, the band recorded and released the album Evoked From Abysmal Sleep, released by Aftermath Music, Parasitic Records and Flowing Downwards. The band played live for the first time since 2005 at Kill-Town Deathfest in Copenhagen, Denmark.

== Members ==
=== Current ===
- Nicklas Rudolfsson - guitar (1990–present), vocals (1997–present), drums (1990–1993), bass (1990–1992)
- Emma Rudolfsson - bass (2000–present)
- Daniel Moilanen - drums (2000–present)
- Jonas Blom - guitar (2018–present)

=== Former ===
- Robert "Reaper" Pehrsson - guitar, (1991–1992), vocals (1991–1993)
- Johan Norman (session/touring) - guitar (1992–1993)
- Alex Losbäck - bass (touring/session member) (1992–1993)
- Fredrik Johnsson - guitar (1997–2003)
- Peter Palmdahl - bass (1997–1998)
- Tomas Eriksson - guitar (2002–2003)
- Jonas Blom - drums (1998)
- Johan Bäckman - bass (1993)

== Discography ==
=== Studio albums ===
- The Supreme Force of Eternity (1998)
- Enter the Realm of Death (1999)
- Resurrection in Blood (2000)
- Requiem of the Apocalypse (2002)
- Moon of the Chaos Eclipse (2002)
- Darkness Death Doom (2003)
- On Funeral Wings (2004)
- Envenom (2005)
- Invocation of Magick (2006)
- Dawn of the End (2007)
- Evoked From Abysmal Sleep (2018)
- Into Desolate Realms (2019)
- Beyond the Cenotaph of Mankind (2023)
- Cycle of the Dying Sun (Dawn of Ashen Realms) (2025)
- After Chaos: Nocturnal Vigil (2026)

=== EPs ===
- Ancient Incantations (2001)
- Moon of the Chaos Eclipse (2002)
- Black Magick Sorceress (2005)
- Bound in Magick Haze (2015)
- The Opening of Dead Gates (2019)
- Last Skull of Humanity (2023)

=== Live albums ===
- Dark Live Magick (2001)
- Darkness Death Doom (2003)
