= Moonlover =

Studio album by Ghost Bath
- Released: April 10, 2015
- Recorded: Michigan
- Genre: Black metal; post-metal; blackgaze
- Length: 42:06, 49:36 (reissue)
- Label: Northern Silence, Nuclear Blast (reissue)
- Producer: Joshua Schroeder

Ghost Bath chronology
Funeral (2014)	Moonlover (2015)	Starmourner (2017)

Moonlover is the second studio album by American post-metal band Ghost Bath. Recorded by producer Joshua Schroeder in Michigan, it was released on April 10, 2015 through, Northern Silence Productions. The album is the first Ghost Bath release after the band was revealed to be from North Dakota.

The album drew comparisons to California-based black metal band Deafheaven in terms of style and song titles, which were criticized by Deafheaven guitarist Kerry McCoy.

The album cover art features "La Luna 1989" by Guatemalan photographer Luis González Palma.

== Critical reception ==
Professional ratings
Review scores
Source	Rating
Consequence of Sound	B+
MetalSucks	5/5 stars

The album received generally positive reviews from critics. Adam Kivel of Consequence of Sound thought that the band is "exposing a pained and painful honesty rather than chasing an arbitrary genre mutation." Kivel further wrote: "Rather than approach blackgaze with bared teeth and sharpened knives, Ghost Bath lets you hear the thudding beat of its heart until it can’t hold up anymore." MetalSucks' David Lee Rothmund praised the album, describing it as "a blind dive into a black chasm whose bottom is made of big, cushy teddy bears" and "a real synthesis — not of disparate noises, but of their intensities."

== Track listing ==
No.	Title	Length
1.	"The Sleeping Fields"	1:26
2.	"Golden Number"	9:08
3.	"Happyhouse"	8:44
4.	"Beneath the Shade Tree"	4:47
5.	"The Silver Flower Pt. 1"	4:03
6.	"The Silver Flower Pt. 2"	7:33
7.	"Death and the Maiden"	6:25

Reissue bonus track
No.	Title	Length
8.	"Ascension"	7:30

== Personnel ==
- Ghost Bath — performance
- Joshua Schroeder — production, engineering, mixing, mastering
