= Walk in Darkness =

Italian metal band

- Origin: Italy
- Genres: Gothic Metal, Symphonic Metal
- Years active: 2015–present
- Members: Shaman; Nicoletta Rosellini; Monk Key
- Website: walkindarkness.com/wid/

Walk in Darkness is an Italian gothic metal and symphonic metal band formed in 2015. They released their debut album, In the Shadows of Things, in 2017.

The album features the track "Alexandria" recorded in collaboration with soprano Magdalena Lee from Tears of Magdalena.

In 2018, they released their second album, Welcome to the New World, accompanied by a music video for the track "Away to the Stars".

In 2020, during the height of the COVID-19 pandemic, Walk in Darkness released On the Road to Babylon, which further explores the band's themes through the depiction of a dystopian world on the brink of twilight. Their fourth album, Leaves Rolling in Time, was released in 2022 and is a concept album depicting a post-apocalyptic scenario. The album's narrative centers on themes of loss and resilience in a future world where much of humanity's heritage has been forgotten.

== Current members ==
Apart from lead vocalist Nicoletta Rosellini, a former member of Kalidia and current frontwoman of Alterium, the other band members choose to remain hooded and anonymous. This anonymity is part of the band's philosophy, aiming to focus attention on their music and its themes rather than individual identities.

The driving force behind the band is Shaman or Shaman Wid, the guitarist and songwriter who also defines the philosophy of Walk in Darkness.

- Nicoletta Rosellini: lead vocals
- Shaman WID: guitars, composer, lyricist
- Monk Key: bass
- Arcanus: drums

=== Collaborators ===
- Alessandro Guasconi: keyboards, synths, arrangements
- Emiliano Pasquinelli: growl vocals

== Band history ==
Walk in Darkness gained considerable recognition with their debut album, In the Shadows of Things, released in 2017. The album received a notable amount of attention, with strong streaming numbers and positive reviews from specialized music media, including Rock Hard and others. The debut album features the track "Alexandria", recorded in collaboration with Finnish soprano Magdalena Lee from Tears of Magdalena.

Following their initial success, Walk in Darkness continued to produce music, releasing three more albums and several singles.

In an interview published in August 2025, vocalist Nicoletta Rosellini announced that Walk in Darkness were working on their fifth album, which is expected to be released digitally by the end of the year.

== Discography ==
Albums

- In the Shadows of Things (2017)
- Welcome to the New World (2018)
- On the Road to Babylon (2020)
- Leaves Rolling in Time (2022)
- Gods Don't Take Calls (2025)

Singles

- Time to Rise (2019)
- Nothing (2019)
- On the Road to Babylon (2020)
- Bent by Storms and Dreams (2021)
- The Last Glow of Day (2021)
- Walk Close to Me (2022)
- No Oxygen in the West (2022)
- Towards Chang'an (2023)
- Across the Oceans (2023)
- Mother (2024)
- Freedom (2024)

== Style and themes ==
Walk in Darkness' music is characterized by a blend of gothic and symphonic metal, often incorporating dark, atmospheric elements. The band's lyrics explore themes such as the fragility of humanity, existential struggles, and the passage of time. Their concept albums frequently depict dystopian or post-apocalyptic settings, where their songs touch on broader topics like identity, hope, and the search for meaning.
