= Pest Productions =

- Founded: 2006
- Founder: Deng Zhang, Wu
- Genre: Black metal, atmospheric metal, dark ambient, shoegaze, post-metal, folk metal
- Country of origin: China
- Location: Nanchang, Jiangxi
- Official website: www.pest666.com

Pest Productions is a Chinese-based independent record label founded in 2006, focusing around atmospheric black metal artists and features an international roster of musicians. It also features two sub-division/sub-labels titled Self-Destruction (started in 2008) and Autumn Flood (started in 2006). It has also released three various artists compilations titled "The World Comes to an End in the End of a Journey," "Depression and Hatred of 3 Years," and "Der Wanderer über dem Nebelmeer".

== History ==
The label opened in Nanchang, Jiangxi in the Summer of 2006 and was started by Deng Zhang and Wu of Chinese depressive black metal band Be Persecuted. Pest Productions is the most-known record label for black metal in China. According to an article of Decibel the label signs bands from all possible subgenres of black, from primitive raw sounding black metal to experimental, ambient and atmospheric black metal.

Deng Zhang, wo co-started the label, works as a graphic designer and musician. He also runs two more record labels. Wu left the label after the release of a demo record of his band so Deng was the sole member responsible of Pest Productions. In the first year of existence the label had financial trouble so the risk of closing Pest Productions was not an unrealistic scenario. Thanks to the help of other musicians Deng was friends with he was able to keep the label running. With the release of Zuriaake's debut record Afterimage of Autumn Pest Productions managed to publish an album which became a milestone in Chinese black metal scene.

The label gained attention with signing the American blackgaze band Ghost Bath whose origin was unknown by the time of signing. Because of Bandcamp who demanded a location singer Dennis Mikula chose Chongqing as their location of origin. Due to contradictions the musicians revealed to be from Minot, North Dakota. In 2014 Pest Productions released Ghost Bath's debut album Funeral. It was revealed that Deng initially planned to drop the band but decided against his plans after listening to the band's first album. Deng stated that a person who supported the label in South America demanded to drop the band. It is not known whether Deng knew of the band's real origin or if he was clueless.

Meanwhile the label signed several bands and music project from all around the world as well as multi-national acts. Some well-known groups the label signed are Heretoir and Thränenkind from Germany and Make a Change… Kill Yourself from Denmark.

== Artists ==
- Altus Astrum (Ireland)
- Anhedonia (Sweden)
- Apocynthion (Spain)
- Astral Luminous (United States of America)
- Bauda (Chile)
- Chaotic Aeon (China)
- Cerberus (China)
- Dernier Martyr (Russia)
- Deep Mountains (China)
- Dopamine (China)
- Dysthymia (Iceland)
- Elhaz (France)
- E.D.I.E.H (China)
- From Chaos (China)
- Heretoir (Germany)
- Heartless (China)
- Hinsidig (Norway/Germany)
- Höstkänslor (Peru)
- The Illusion Of Dawn (China)
- In The Abyss (China)
- The Last Days (Mexico/Brazil)
- Líam (Germany)
- Lotus of Darkness (Thailand)
- Means to an End (United States of America/Belgium)
- Midwinter (China)
- Morose (United Kingdom)
- Nectar (China)
- Pure Wrath (Indonesia)
- Secretly In Pain (China)
- Seeds of Iblis (Iraq)
- Sinisterite (United Kingdom/Finland)
- Skeletal Augury (China)
- Skendöd (Sweden/Iceland)
- Súl ad Astral (New Zealand/United States of America)
- Thränenkind (Germany)
- Transylvania (Canada)
- Vergissmeinnicht (China)
- Yn Gizarm | 英吉沙 (China)
- Zuriaake | 葬屍湖 (China)
- Be Persecuted (China)

=== Self-Destruction artists ===
- Heartless (China)
- Secretly In Pain (China)

=== Autumn Flood artists ===
- Chaos Division (China)
- Deep Mountains (China)
- E.D.I.E.H (China)
- Excruciate 666 (France)
- From Chaos (China)
- Gol Dolan
- The Illusion Of Dawn (China)
- Morose (United Kingdom)
- Natt (Turkey)
- Original Sin (China)
- Songs Over Ruin (China)
- Varuna (China)
- Yell (China)
- Yn Gizarm (China)
- Zaliva-D(China)
