= Orthodox (band) =

Metalcore band from Tennessee

- Also known as: Orthodox TN, Orthodox Straight Edge
- Origin: Nashville, Tennessee, U.S.
- Genres: Nu metalcore, metalcore
- Years active: 2011–present
- Labels: Century Media, Unbeaten, Hypergiant, Clear Minded
- Members: Adam Easterling: Austin Evans; Shiloh Krebs; Mike White; Ben Touchberry
- Past members: Tyler Williams: Curtis DeRard; Zachariah Wicht; Michael Bagley
- Website: orthodoxtn.com

Orthodox is an American metalcore band from Nashville, Tennessee, formed in 2011. The lineup consists of lead vocalist Adam Easterling, guitarists Austin Evans and Ben Touchberry, bass guitarist Shiloh Krebs, and drummer Mike White. They released their first studio album End Of My Wit in 2013 and followed up the next year in 2014 with their extended play Give Me A Reason, both on Clear Minded Records. In 2015, the band released a split EP with Michigan hardcore band Breaking Wheel. They then signed to Unbeaten Records, releasing their sophomore studio album Sounds of Loss in 2017 and third studio album Let It Take Its Course in 2020. They are currently signed to Century Media Records, and have released the single 'Body and Soul' on October 15, 2021, fourth studio album Learning to Dissolve on August 19, 2022, and follow-up single 'Soaking Nerves' on June 26, 2023. They have toured with bands such as Spite, The Acacia Strain, Varials, Harm's Way, Kublai Khan TX, and Stick to Your Guns. Their fifth album A Door Left Open was released on June 6, 2025.

The band's sonic style is described by Adam Easterling as "big pants music", blending traditional metallic hardcore with the aggressive groove metal aggression of bands such as Meshuggah and Slipknot, and the nu metal bounce of bands such as Korn and System of a Down, creating a brand of nu metalcore

== Discography ==
=== Studio albums ===
- End of My Wit (Clear Minded, 2013)
- Sounds of Loss (Unbeaten, 2017)
- Let It Take Its Course (Unbeaten, 2020)
- Learning to Dissolve (Century Media, 2022)
- A Door Left Open (Century Media, 2025)

=== Extended plays ===
- Give Me a Reason (Clear Minded, 2014)
- Orthodox / Breaking Wheel (Hypergiant, 2015)

=== Singles ===
- "Hell" (2014)
- "I'm Scared of You" (2017)
- "The Anticipation" (2018)
- "I Can Show You God" (2019)
- "Let It Take Its Course" (2019)
- "Look at Me" (2020)
- "Body and Soul" (2021)
- "Head on a Spike" (2022)
- "Cave In" (2022)
- "Dissolve" (2022)
- "Nothing to See" (2023)
- "Soaking Nerves" (2023)
- "The Other Side of the Nail" (2024)
- "Commit to Consequence" (2025)
- "Searching for a Pulse" (2025)
- "Sacred Place" (2025)
- "Keep Your Blessings" (2025)

== Band members ==
=== Current ===
- Adam Easterling - lead vocals (2011–present), drums (2017)
- Austin Evans - lead guitar, clean vocals (2018–present), rhythm guitar (2018-2025)
- Shiloh Krebs - bass (2018–present)
- Mike White - drums (2017–present)
- Ben Touchberry - rhythm guitar (2025–present) (touring 2023-2025)

=== Former ===
- Tyler Williams - lead guitar (2011-2017), rhythm guitar (2015-2018), bass (2016-2017)
- Curtis Derard - rhythm guitar (2011-2015)
- Zachariah Wichter - bass (2011-2016)
- Michael Bagley - drums (2011-2016)
- Jacob Lilly (Chamber) - bass (touring 2018)
