= Within Destruction =

Slovenian deathcore band

- Origin: Jesenice, Slovenia
- Genres: Deathcore; nu metalcore; slam death metal (early)
- Years active: 2010–present
- Labels: Sumerian; Noisehead; Rising Nemesis; Unique Leader; Ultra Heavy
- Members: Rok Rupnik; Luka Vezzosi; Howard Fang
- Past members: Grega Novak; Matjaž Muhič; Ervin Bešič; Tilen Šimon; Janez Skumavc; Damir Frlan; Damir Juretič; Kristjan Bajuk; Francesco Filigoi
- Website: sadboikroo.com

Within Destruction is a Slovenian deathcore band formed in 2010 in Jesenice. The band originally began as a deathcore/death metal band, before drawing in influences from metalcore and nu metal, as well as showing anime influences. The band's lineup currently consists of lead vocalist Rok Rupnik, guitarist and clean vocalist Howard Fang and drummer Luka Vezzosi. The band has released six studio albums with their latest being Animetal, released on April 11, 2025 through Sumerian Records.

== History ==
Within Destruction was formed in the Slovenian town of Jesenice in 2010. In 2012, the band would sign to Austrian label, Noisehead Records and release their debut studio album titled From the Depths on September 15, 2012. The band would later on sign to German label, Rising Nemesis Records and release their second studio album titled Void in 2016.

On March 30, 2018, the band independently released their third studio album titled Deathwish, the album was mixed and mastered by Fit for an Autopsy guitarist Will Putney. However, the band would sign to Unique Leader Records in September 2018 and re-release the album through the label in October 2018. In support of the album, the band toured in Europe in 2018 with Stillbirth and Walking Dead on Broadway and in the United States in 2019 with Lorna Shore, Enterprise Earth and Bodysnatcher.

The band released their fourth studio album titled Yōkai on August 12, 2020. The album showed influences from hip-hop, pop, electronic-music as well as Japanese themes. The band's fifth studio album titled Lotus was released on September 30, 2022, through Ultra Heavy Records. The album too showed influences from electronic-music and hip-hop, as well as nu-metal, metalcore and anime influences. On December 1, 2023, the band surprise released an EP titled Rebirth, The EP features guest vocals from Signs of the Swarm vocalist, David Simonich and Distant vocalist, Alan Grnja. The EP would abandon any Japanese/nu-metalcore influences and return to the band's original deathcore style. The band's sixth studio album titled Animetal was released on April 11, 2025 through Sumerian Records. Animetal would see the band return to nu-metalcore, electronic-music and Japanese themes. In support of the album, the band would go on a headline tour in Europe, Australia and Asia.

== Band members ==
Current

- Rok Rupnik – lead vocals (2010–present)
- Luka Vezzosi – drums (2010–present)
- Howard Fang – guitars (2020–present), clean vocals (2022–present)

Former

- Grega Novak – bass (2010–2011)
- Matjaž Muhič – guitars (2010–2015)
- Ervin Bešič – guitars (2010–2013)
- Tilen Šimon – bass (2011–2012)
- Janez Skumavc – bass (2012–2019)
- Damir Frlan – guitars (2013–2015)
- Damir Juretič – guitars (2015–2019)
- Kristjan Bajuk – guitars (2016–2019)
- Francesco Filigoi – guitars (2019–2021)

== Discography ==
Studio Albums

- From the Depths (2012)
- Void (2016)
- Deathwish (2018)
- Yōkai (2020)
- Lotus (2022)
- Animetal (2025)

EPs

- Rebirth (2023)

Singles

- "Bloodbath" (2014)
- "Carnage" (2015)
- "Hate Me" (2020)
- "Malevolent" (2020)
- "No Way Out" (2020)
- "Harakiri" (2020)
- "Plague of Immortality 2.0" (2021)
- "Self-Hatred 2.0" (2021)
- "Nightmare" (2022)
- "Survival" (2022)
- "Dying World" (2022)
- "Toxic" (2022)
- "ANIMETAL" (2024)
- "DEMON CHILD" (2024)
- "KANASHIBARI" (2024)
