= Ghost Bath =

American band

- Origin: Minot, North Dakota, U.S.
- Genres: Post-black metal, shoegaze
- Years active: 2012–present
- Labels: Nuclear Blast, Northern Silence, Pest
- Members: Dennis Mikula; Tim Church; John Olivier; Josh Jaye
- Website: ghostbath.bandcamp.com

Ghost Bath is an American black metal band from Minot, North Dakota, formed in 2012 and fronted by Dennis Mikula. They have released five studio albums and one EP, melding black metal and post-rock. They gained notoriety for marketing themselves as Chinese.

== History ==
The band claimed to be from Chongqing, China. Their 2014 debut studio albumm Funeralm was released on Chinese record label Pest Productions. They signed to Northern Silence Productions for the release of their second album, Moonlover in 2015. Upon gaining increased media attention, including critical acclaim from Pitchfork and Stereogum, the band was revealed to be from Minot, North Dakota and fronted by Dennis Mikula. When asked why the band did not correct the false reports on their origin, Mikula stated, "We refused to correct people because we do not wish to put actual faces onto our music. It is our wish as a band to connect to all human beings." In 2017, the band followed up Moonlover with Starmourner. In 2021, they announced Self Loather, the last album in a trilogy that began with Moonlover. In 2025, the band announced their fifth album, Rose Thorn Necklace, would be released on May 9 via Nuclear Blast.

== Musical style ==
Ghost Bath is typically considered a black metal band, but they blend the tremolo picking guitar play and shrieked vocals of the genre with the uplifting melodies and atmospheric qualities of post-rock. Their style has thus been described as blackgaze and post-black metal and frequently compared to that of fellow American band Deafheaven, particularly on their breakthrough 2013 album Sunbather.

== Discography ==
=== Studio albums ===
- Funeral (2014)
- Moonlover (2015)
- Starmourner (2017)
- Self Loather (2021)
- Rose Thorn Necklace (2025)

=== EPs ===
- Ghost Bath (2013)
