= Rose Thorn Necklace =

Studio album by Ghost Bath
- Released: May 9, 2025
- Recorded: January–June 2024
- Studios: The Atomic Garden (Oakland); Heaven and Heller
- Genre: Post-black metal
- Length: 35:13
- Label: Nuclear Blast
- Producer: Dennis Mikula

Ghost Bath chronology
Self Loather (2021)	Rose Thorn Necklace (2025)

Singles from Rose Thorn Necklace
- 1. "Rose Thorn Necklace" Released: February 21, 2025

Rose Thorn Necklace is the fifth studio album by American black metal band Ghost Bath. It was released on May 9, 2025, by Nuclear Blast Records.

The album, preceded by the band's 2021 project, Self Loather, was written by Dennis Mikula, the band's lead vocalist, who recorded it in his home. The title track was released as the lead single of the album on February 21, 2025, alongside a music video directed by Blo0m.

== Reception ==
Professional ratings
Review scores
Source	Rating
Blabbermouth	8/10 stars
Distorted Sound	8/10 stars
Metal Hammer	8/10 stars

Remfry Dedman of Metal Hammer wrote in his review of the album, "Rose Thorn Necklace is stuffed full of unexpected ideas, twists and turns that belie its run-time," rating it eight out of ten. New Noise Magazine referred to Rose Thorn Necklace as "what may be their most darkly divine record to-date", stating it "plays on disparaging concepts and exercises them through each woeful track in a way that feels like spreading ashes out into the sea." Distorted Sound assigned the album a rating of eight out of ten, remarking "Rose Thorn Necklace proves there's still plenty left to give, and their leading man's vision to 'really explore some disturbing things…and tie all of those together' is realised impressively." Blabbermouth, also rating the album eight out of ten, described it as "easily the most cohesive record of the band's career" and "deeply strange and quietly impressive."

== Track listing ==
All tracks are written by Dennis Mikula.

Rose Thorn Necklace track listing
No.	Title	Length
1.	"Grotesque Display"	1:56
2.	"Rose Thorn Necklace"	4:14
3.	"Well, I Tried Drowning"	4:22
4.	"Thinly Sliced Heart Muscle"	3:17
5.	"Dandelion Tea"	4:50
6.	"Vodka Butterfly"	4:34
7.	"Stamen and Pistil"	5:06
8.	"Needles"	2:13
9.	"Throat Cancer"	4:41
Total length:		35:13

== Personnel ==
Credits adapted from Bandcamp and Tidal.

=== Ghost Bath ===
- Tim Church – performance
- Josh Jaye – performance
- Dennis "Nameless" Mikula – performance, production, recording
- John Olivier – performance

=== Additional contributors ===
- Jack Shirley – mixing, mastering
- Mike Heller – drums
- Chewie – piano and piano recording on "Needles"
- Ksenija Tarasova – cover art, additional art
- Luciferium War Graphics – logos
