= Norilsk (band) =

Canadian rock band

- Origin: Gatineau, Quebec, Canada
- Genres: Blackened death metal, sludge metal
- Years active: 2012–present
- Website: norilskdoom.com

Norilsk is a two-piece death/sludge metal band from Gatineau, Quebec, Canada.

== Overview ==
Norilsk was named after Norilsk, the northerly Russian mining and industrial Siberian town. It was founded in 2012. The two main band members are Nic Miquelon (instruments and vocals) and Nick Richer (drums, backing vocals), together with other collaborators.

The band sings in mostly French, and performs in the "blackened sludge death" metal style.

== Discography ==
As of 2018.

- Japetus, EP, 2014
- The Idea Of North, Album, 2015
- Le Passage des glaciers, Album, 2017
- Weepers of the Land, Album, 2018
