= Chamber (metalcore band) =

American band

- Origin: Nashville, Tennessee, United States
- Genres: Metalcore, mathcore
- Years active: 2017–present
- Labels: Pure Noise Records, Unbeaten Records
- Members: Gabe Manuel: Chris Smith; Taylor Carpenter; Jacob Lilly; Henry Dierig
- Past members: Sam Fleming: Taylor Stephenson; Mike Moynihan
- Website: chamber615.com

Chamber is an American metalcore band from Nashville, Tennessee formed in 2017. They have released two EPs titled Hatred Softly Spoken and Final Shape/In Search of Truth in 2018 before releasing their third EP Ripping / Pulling / Tearing in 2019. They then released their first studio album Cost of Sacrifice in 2020. The band then released their fourth EP titled Carved in Stone in 2022, before releasing their second studio album A Love to Kill For in 2023. They are currently signed to Pure Noise Records.

The current members are lead vocalist Jacob Lilly, guitarist and vocalist Gabe Manuel, guitarist Henry Dierig, bass guitarist Chris Smith, and drummer Taylor Carpenter.

== Musical style and influences ==
The band self-refer to their sound as "psychotic mosh metal", with extreme use of dissonant chords, odd-time instrumentation, blast beats, and occasional lush, melodic moments. Some of their songs include electronic sounds of synth and programmed drums. The elements found in their songs are that of mathcore and death metal.

They are heavily influenced by bands such as Converge, Deftones, Botch, Coalesce, Gojira, and Slipknot.

== Members ==
=== Current members ===
- Gabe Manuel – guitar, backing vocals (2017–present)
- Chris Smith – bass (2017–present)
- Taylor Carpenter – drums (2017–present)
- Jacob Lilly – lead vocals (2018–present)
- Henry Dierig – guitar (2022–present)

=== Former members ===
- Sam Fleming – lead vocals (2017–2018)
- Taylor Stephenson – guitar (2017–2019)
- Mike Moynihan – guitar (2019–2020)

=== Former touring musicians ===
- Jordan King – drums (2026; substitute for Taylor Carpenter)

== Discography ==
=== Studio albums ===
- Cost of Sacrifice (2020)
- A Love to Kill For (2023)
- this is goodbye... (2026)

=== Extended plays ===
- Hatred Softly Spoken (2018)
- Final Shape / In Search of Truth (2018)
- Carved in Stone (2022)

=== Compilations ===
- Ripping / Pulling / Tearing (2019)

=== Singles ===
- "Replacing Every Weakness" (2019)
- "Scars in Complex Patterns" (2020)
- "Visions of Hostility" (2020)
- "In Cleansing Fire" (2020)
- "Numb (Transfuse)" (2020)
- "Cellophane Form" (2022)
- "Tremble" (2023)
- "Devoured (featuring Matt Honeycutt of Kublai Khan TX, 2023)
- "Retribution" (2023)
- "Tears of Joy" (2024)
