= Turn It Up (Texas Hippie Coalition song) =

Single by Texas Hippie Coalition

from the album Peacemaker
- Released: May 15, 2012
- Genre: Heavy metal; southern metal; groove metal; hard rock
- Length: 3:43
- Label: Carved
- Producer: Bob Marlette

Texas Hippie Coalition singles chronology
"Turn It Up" (2012)	"Damn You to Hell" (2013)

"Turn It Up" is a song by American heavy metal band Texas Hippie Coalition. Released on June 13, 2012, it is the first single from Peacemaker, the third studio album from the ensemble. The song is the first by the band to chart on the Billboard Mainstream Rock chart, peaking at number 39.

== Release ==
The lyric video was published on April 30, 2012, with the single being available for purchase on May 15, 2012. The song then went to radio on May 22, 2012, with an official music video released on June 14, 2012.

== Recording ==
Produced by director Clark Deal of Chaotic Studios, the music video for the song was filmed at Vinnie's Clubhouse (owned by Vinnie Paul of Pantera and Hellyeah) and features female adult entertainers dancing throughout the film to the signature red dirt metal sound of the ensemble. The song is about being addicted to music, and was an opportunity for dancers to perform alongside heavy metal music instead of the usual hip hop and pop music to which many are accustomed. Strategically placed in the plot footage were a Blessed Mother figurine on the automobile dashboard, a crucifix necklace on the rear view mirror as well as a picture of Dimebag Darrell (who was a connoisseur and owner of strip clubs) hung on the wall.

== Critical reception ==
Robert Bell of the Arkansas Times described the song as a "total strip-joint anthem about a preacher's daughter who finds means of employment outside of the flock". Todd Lyons of About.com stated that the composition "refers to the power of roaring Texas music to induce women to shed their clothing" and that it has "the first breath of fresh air on the album with an excellent middle-eight melody modulation".

== Personnel ==
- Big Dad Ritch – lead vocals
- John Exall – bass
- Randy Cooper – guitar
- Wes Wallace – guitar
- Timmy Braun – drums

== Chart performance ==
Chart (2012)	Peak position
US Mainstream Rock Songs (Billboard)	39
