= Outlawed (disambiguation) =

Outlawed may refer to:

- Outlawed (1921 film), an American film
- Outlawed (1929 film), an American film
- Outlawed (album), by Attila
- Outlawed (novel), a 2021 novel by Anna North

== See also ==
- Outlaw (disambiguation)
- Outlaws (disambiguation)
