= Outlaw (disambiguation) =

An outlaw is a person who is declared as no longer protected by the law.

Outlaw may also refer to:

== Arts and entertainment ==
=== Films and television ===
- The Outlaw, a 1943 western directed by Howard Hughes
- Útlaginn (The Outlaw), a 1981 Icelandic film
- Outlaw (1999 film), an Italian film
- Outlaw (2007 film), an action-crime-drama film written and directed by Nick Love
- The Outlaw (1939 film), an Argentine film
- The Outlaw (1953 film), an Iranian film
- The Outlaw (2010 film), a Spanish-language film about Lope de Vega
- Outlaw (TV series), a 2010 American courtroom drama
- "Outlaw" (Justified), an episode
- Outlaw (TV network), an American television network
- Outlaw Productions, an American film production company formed by Robert Newmyer

=== Music ===
- Outlaw music, a music genre started in Texas in 1960
- Outlaw Recordz, an American hip-hop record label
- Outlaw (Alabama 3 album), 2005
- Outlaw (Mark Chesnutt album), 2010
- Outlaw (War album), also a title track
- "Outlaw" (50 Cent song), 2011
- "Outlaw" (Olive song), 1996
- "Outlaw", from the album Good Music by Joan Jett and the Blackhearts
- "Outlaw", from the album Fire Down Under, by Riot
- "Outlaw", from the album When the Sun Goes Down by Selena Gomez & the Scene
- "The Outlaw", from the album Infected by HammerFall
- K229CC in Des Moines, Iowa, known as 93.7 the Outlaw
- W288CQ in Asheville, North Carolina, known as 105.5 the Outlaw
- WGLD-FM, and its simulcast partner WXJY in Myrtle Beach, South Carolina, once known as 93.9 the Outlaw
- WOTX in Lunenburg, Vermont, known as 93.7 the Outlaw

=== Other arts and entertainment ===
- Outlaw (Marvel Comics), a Marvel Comics fictional character
- Outlaw (novel), the first novel of the Outlaw Chronicles series by Angus Donald
- Outlaw (stock character)
- The Outlaw (play), an 1871 one-act play by Swedish playwright August Strindberg
- Outlaw (1976 video game), a 1976 single-player arcade game
- Outlaw (1978 video game), a 1978 Atari 2600 game
- Outlaw (Rolemaster), a 1991 supplement for the role-playing game Rolemaster

== People ==
- Outlaw (surname), a list of people with the surname
- Joe Swail (born 1969), professional snooker player nicknamed "The Outlaw"
- "Outlaw" Ron Bass (wrestler) (1948–2017), American former professional wrestler
- Billy Gunn (born 1963), American professional wrestler who initially performed in Total Nonstop Action Wrestling under the "The New Age Outlaw" ring name, which was eventually shortened to just "The Outlaw"

== Geography ==
- Outlaw Peak, a mountain in Alberta, Canada
- Outlaw Rock, a rock near Adelaide Island, Antarctica
- Outlaw Spire, a rock pillar in Utah, US

== Other uses ==
- The Outlaw, a bridge built between Canada and the US on Ontario Highway 61
- Outlaw (railroading jargon), a crew (or train) which can no longer move because they have reached the maximum number of hours they are allowed to work
- Outlaw (roller coaster), a wooden roller coaster at Adventureland in Altoona, Iowa
- OUT-LAW, a legal news and information website
- Griffon Aerospace MQM-170 Outlaw, an unmanned aerial vehicle
- Williamsport Outlaws, also called the New Jersey Outlaws and the Pennsylvania Outlaws, a former professional ice hockey team in the Federal Hockey League

== See also ==
- Outlaws (disambiguation)
