= Go pro =

Go pro may refer to:

- GoPro, brand of small cameras and camcorders and also a drone manufacturer
- Go professional, a professional player in the game of Go
- "Go Pro", a song by Ab-Soul from the album Soul Burger
- "Go Pro", a song by Texas Hippie Coalition from Ride On
- Tim & Eric's Go Pro Show, a series of short videos by Tim & Eric
