= Peacemaker (Texas Hippie Coalition album) =

Studio album by Texas Hippie Coalition
- Released: August 14, 2012
- Genre: Heavy metal; southern metal; groove metal; hard rock
- Length: 42:35
- Label: Carved Records
- Producer: Bob Marlette

Texas Hippie Coalition chronology
Rollin' (2010)	Peacemaker (2012)	Ride On (2014)

Singles from Peacemaker
- 1. "Turn It Up" Released: June 13, 2012; 2. "Damn You to Hell" Released: May 19, 2013; 3. "Hands Up" Released: July 15, 2013

Peacemaker is the third studio album by American heavy metal band Texas Hippie Coalition. It was released on August 14, 2012 and reached No. 20 on the Billboard Hard Rock Albums chart. The singles "Damn You to Hell" and "Turn It Up" were the first by the band to chart on the Billboard Mainstream Rock chart, peaking at 40 and 39, respectively. The album's cover features a box with a revolver and a Texas Ranger badge.

== Production ==
The album was produced by Bob Marlette.

== Composition ==
According to lead vocalist Big Dad Ritch, "Peacemaker", the title track from the album, was written from the perspective of a gun, due to many of his previous compositions being written from his point of view. He goes on to state that "I'm not using that gun to rob somebody, to take what they got, I'm gonna be using that gun to protect what's mine." The album also contains the track "Turn It Up", which talks about a woman who was born to a religious leader who starts down the road to become an adult entertainer.

== Track listing ==
All tracks are written by Bob Marlette, Big Dad Ritch, and Wes Wallace, except where noted

Peacemaker track listing
No.	Title	Length
1.	"Hands Up" (Marlette, Ritch)	3:56
2.	"Damn You to Hell" (Ritch, Wallace)	3:35
3.	"8 Seconds"	4:02
4.	"Outlaw"	3:00
5.	"Turn It Up"	3:43
6.	"Wicked" (Marlette, Ritch)	3:45
7.	"Don't Come Lookin'" (Marlette, Ritch)	3:50
8.	"Sex & Drugs & Rock and Roll"	3:52
9.	"Paw Paw Hill"	4:01
10.	"Peacemaker" (Randy Cooper, Marlette, Ritch, Wallace)	4:23
11.	"Think of Me" (Marlette, Ritch)	4:28
12.	"Whiskey" (iTunes bonus track)	3:49
Total length:		42:35

== Personnel ==
- Big Dad Ritch – lead vocals
- John Exall – bass
- Randy Cooper – guitar
- Wes Wallace – guitar
- Timmy Braun – drums

== Charts ==
Chart (2012)	Peak position	Sales
US Heatseekers Albums	4	US: 16,000
US Independent Albums	31	US: 16,000
US Hard Rock Albums	20	US: 16,000

=== Singles ===
Year	Title	US Main. Rock
2013	"Turn It Up"	39
2013	"Damn You to Hell"	40
