= Stoned Cowboys =

Studio album by Texas Hippie Coalition
- Released: September 11, 2026
- Genre: Heavy metal
- Length: 35:29
- Label: Bigdadrecords / Vanity Music Group
- Producer: Steve Chadie

Texas Hippie Coalition chronology
Gunsmoke (2024)	Stoned Cowboys (2026)	Band of Outlaws (2026)

Stoned Cowboys is the ninth studio album by American red dirt metal band Texas Hippie Coalition. Released on September 11, 2026, the album was published by Bigdadrecords, the band's very own record label.

== Critical reception ==
Paul MacMillan of Ghost Cult Magazine described the work as a "further drift into their deep country roots with a heavy true outlaw country style".

Richard Rosenthal of Screamer Magazine portrayed the compilation as "while still trademark THC heavy, incorporates familiar country music instrumentation and lyrics".

Brave Words & Bloody Knuckles stated that the album is a "further drift into their deep country roots with a heavy true outlaw country style".

== Track listing ==
No.	Title	Length
1.	"Fire Fire"	3:45
2.	"Last of the Outlaws"	3:15
3.	"Put the Gun Down"	3:21
4.	"No Relation"	3:30
5.	"Damned Ol' Country Song"	3:12
6.	"Writing Songs in the Rain"	3:31
7.	"High in the Saddle"	3:40
8.	"Bring Me the Moon"	3:52
9.	"Down Come a Hammer"	3:43
10.	"Rope the Wind"	3:40
Total length:		35:29
