= Monster in Me =

Monster in Me may refer to:

- "Monster in Me", a 2014 song by Texas Hippie Coalition from Ride On
- "Monster in Me", a 2018 song by Little Mix from LM5
