= Scattered Hamlet =

American rock band

- Origin: Greene County, Pennsylvania, U.S.
- Genres: Hard rock, southern rock, southern metal
- Years active: 2010–present
- Label: Buck Moon
- Members: Adam Joad; Sean Shepperd; Grant Jenkins
- Website: scatteredhamlet.com

Scattered Hamlet is a four-piece hard rock/southern rock band formed in 2010 when lead vocalist Adam Joad created the original blueprint for the band with help from Otep guitarist Ari Mihalopoulos. They self-describe their musical style as "Honky Tonk Metal", and are known for their high-energy live show and intense touring schedule of over 100 shows a year. The band has played in over 40 U.S. states. Scattered Hamlet's music has been featured on CBS, CMT, Adult Swim, the Travel Channel, VEVO Entertainment, Travis Pastrana's Nitro Circus, and many more. Their 2013 debut album Skeleton Dixie featured a guest appearance by former Texas Hippie Coalition guitarist Randy Cooper. Their sophomore album Swamp Rebel Machine was released November 4, 2016, and was voted as the most anticipated release of that day in a Loudwire reader's poll. It was also their first album to chart, reaching No. 10 on a Billboard Heatseekers chart.

On 24 September 2021, they released a new single and video, "Stereo Overthrow", which was premiered in the UK and Ireland by Uber Rock.

== Jake Delling Le Bas, Stay Hungry, & Dee Snider ==
On September 18, 2017, Scattered Hamlet's long-time drummer Jake Delling Le Bas fell from a third story balcony, sustaining a severe brain injury and entering a coma. This resulted in Scattered Hamlet taking a hiatus until June 19, 2018, when they released a cover of Twisted Sister's Stay Hungry as a tribute to Jake. Their version of Stay Hungry caught the attention of Twisted Sister vocalist Dee Snider who praised the cover and called for prayers for Jake. Dee later recruited Scattered Hamlet guitarist Adam Newell to play with him at two major festivals in August 2018: Skogsröjet in Sweden, and Alcatraz in Belgium.

== Personal ==
Adam Joad, the lead singer is a mixed martial arts practitioner and a purple belt in Brazilian Jiu-Jitsu, with a blue belt rank earned under Eddie Bravo. Grant Jenkins is also a purple belt in Brazilian Jiu-Jitsu.

== Discography ==
=== Studio albums ===
- Skeleton Dixie (2013)
- Swamp Rebel Machine (2016)
- Stereo Overthrow (2021)

=== Live Albums ===
- Live from 123 Pleasant Street, Morgantown, WV (2024)

=== EPs ===
- Hillbilly Harmony (2010)
- Hillbilly Harmony Deluxe (2010)
- Wishing Well (2020)
- Twisted Roots (2025)

=== Singles ===
- Stay Hungry (2018)
