= Rollin' (Texas Hippie Coalition album) =

Studio album by Texas Hippie Coalition
- Released: July 6, 2010
- Genre: Heavy metal; southern metal; groove metal; hard rock
- Length: 40:35
- Label: Carved
- Producer: David Prater

Texas Hippie Coalition chronology
Pride of Texas (2008)	Rollin' (2010)	Peacemaker (2012)

Rollin' is the second studio album by American metal band Texas Hippie Coalition. It was released on July 6, 2010 and reached number 29 on the US Heatseekers Albums chart.

== Production ==
The album, which was their first with Carved Records, contains Version 2 of "Pissed Off and Mad About it" (the first single from the band) produced by David Prater.

== Touring ==
The band toured the United States and Europe in mid-2010 with a stop at Bospop Festival in the Netherlands.

== Critical reception ==
Professional ratings
Review scores
Source	Rating
AllMusic	3.5/5 stars
Classic Rock	6/10 stars

The album was touted by VH1's That Metal Show as "one of the greatest sophomore albums ever".

== Track listing ==
All tracks are written by Randy Cooper, John Exall and Big Dad Ritch, except where noted

Rollin' track listing
No.	Title	Length
1.	"Intervention"	3:56
2.	"Flawed"	3:35
3.	"Rollin'"	4:35
4.	"Jesus Freak"	3:12
5.	"Pissed Off and Mad About It" (Cooper, Exall, Michael Hayes, James Prater, Ritch)	4:05
6.	"Groupie Girl"	4:40
7.	"Saddle Sore"	3:11
8.	"Cocked and Loaded"	4:44
9.	"Back from Hell"	3:50
10.	"Beg"	4:27
Total length:		40:35

== Personnel ==
- Big Dad Ritch – lead vocals
- John Exall – bass
- Randy Cooper – guitar
- Alden "Crawfish" Nequent – guitar
- Ryan "The Kid" Bennett – drums

== Charts ==
Chart (2012)	Peak position
US Heatseekers Albums	29
