= Pedestrian railroad safety in the United States =

Pedestrian railroad safety is concerned with the protection of life through regulation, management and technology development of all forms of rail transportation. In the United States there are some 180,000 miles of track. Pedestrian railroad accidents are the leading cause of death on railways. More than 7,200 pedestrians have been killed by trains in the United States since 1997.

== Train-pedestrian fatalities ==
Pedestrian railroad accidents are the leading cause of death on railways. More than 7,200 pedestrians have been killed by trains in the United States since 1997. An additional 6,400 have been injured. Each year on average about 500 are killed. Between 2001 and 2011, the number of deaths involving trains and motor vehicles dropped 42% to 248. In the same period, deaths involving pedestrians only fell 6% to 434, the Federal Railroad Administration reported. In 2014, every week in the United States, about 16 people were killed by trains.

The most populous states have the greatest number of train fatalities. In 2014, California had 141 deaths.

=== Notable deaths ===
- On August 26, 1991, 41-year-old Mary Theresa Wojtyla, (née Walch), of Chicago, was fatally hit by a Metra commuter train headed by a leased Burlington Northern Railroad EMD E9 locomotive no. 9912 at the Fairview Avenue station in Downers Grove, Illinois, United States. She walked in front of a westbound local stopped at the station although the crossing was still active, and was struck by a westbound express on the center track, killing her instantly. The fatal accident was captured on camera by a railfan originally intending to film the last days of E9 service on Metra. Footage of the accident is used in training videos and shown at many Operation Lifesaver events with the impact edited out.
- In 2014, Camera Assistant Sarah Jones was killed when she was struck by a CSX freight train, led by CSX GE AC4400CW no. 372 that arrived on the trestle on the first day of filming Midnight Rider. The crew was on an active railroad trestle bridge, high over the Altamaha River in Wayne County, Georgia. Although the railroad had denied access to the site, her family brought a suit against CSX.
- In 2014, Jersey Boys musician John Jeffrey Ray was killed by an Amtrak train while posing for a photo in Seattle, Washington.
- In 2015, Greg Plitt was hit and killed by the southbound Metrolink Antelope Valley Line train 268 in Burbank, California, on January 17, 2015, while running between the rails. His death was recorded by the camera mounted in the cab of the engine.
- In 2017, Marjorie Corcoran, an American particle physicist who worked as a professor at Rice University, died while bicycling on February 3, 2017 in Houston, from a collision with a METRORail train.
- On November 9, 2017, James Stobie, a train hopper better known by his YouTube identity Stobe the Hobo, was killed when he was dragged to death by an Amtrak train. According to some reports, his bag became tangled in the Amtrak train and he was dragged to his death. Another report also claims that he fell from a bridge when he became trapped on a bridge below him.
- On July 25, 2024, Grace Bentkowski, a 22-year-old woman, was fatally hit by a South Shore Line train at a crossing while exiting Hegewisch station. Unlike most other level crossings, the crossing at Hegewish station between platforms lacked any warning lights, crossing gates, or signage at the time of the incident.

== Railroad industry response ==
The railroad industry has supported educational initiatives like Operation Lifesaver. The industry also may stage an enforcement blitz or put up "No Trespassing" signs.

== Governmental oversight ==
=== Federal government ===
The United States Department of Transportation administers various regulatory bodies, the most relevant to railway safety being the Federal Railroad Administration (FRA). DOT oversees the John A. Volpe National Transportation Systems Center. Volpe and FRA conduct much of the available research on pedestrian railway safety.

== Engineering ==
=== Anti-trespass panels ===
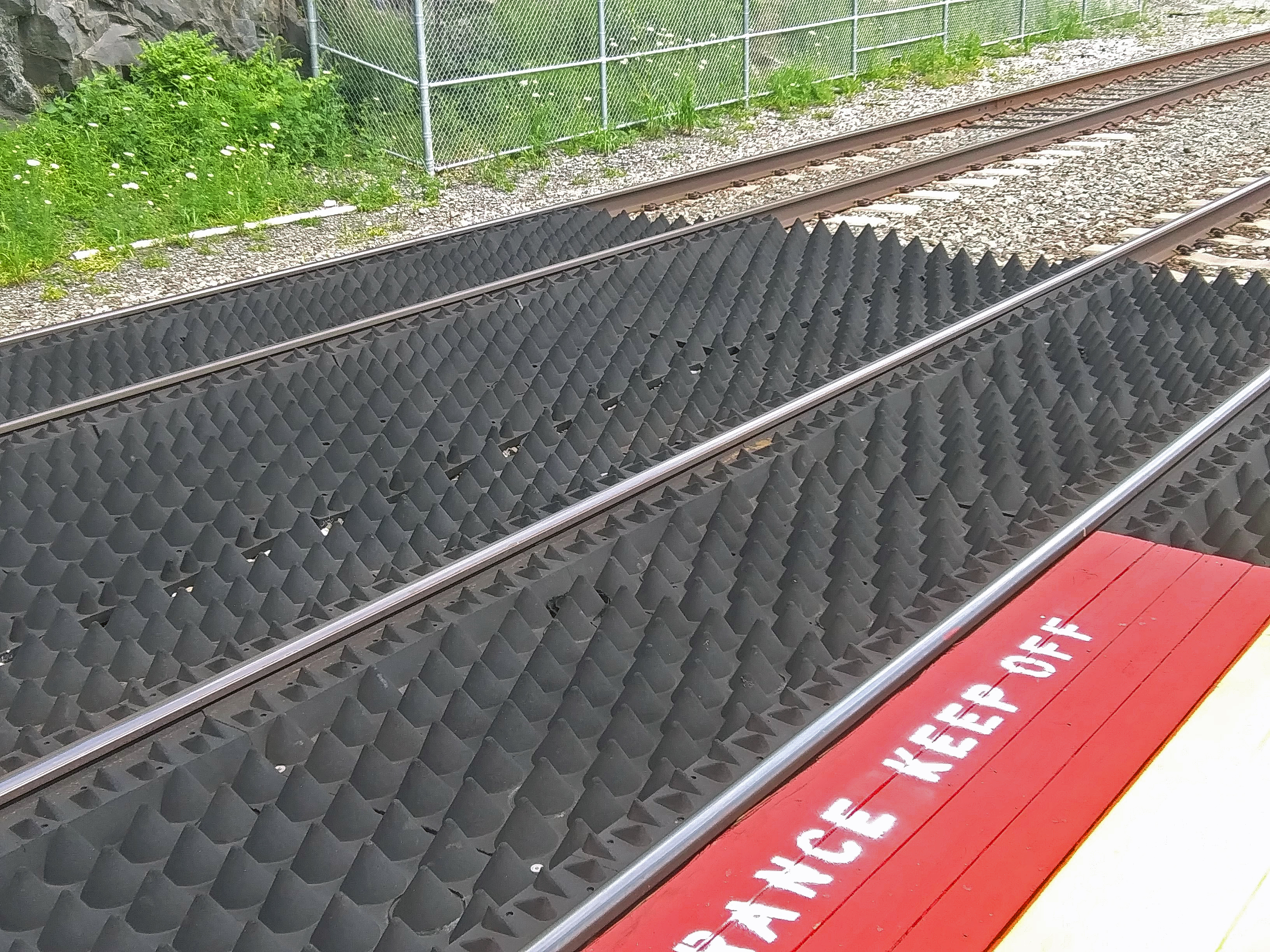
Anti-trespass panels at the Breakneck Ridge station

In the mid-2010s, the Federal Railroad Administration (FRA) did a pilot study on anti-trespass panels, a British innovation consisting of spiky rubber mats designed to be difficult to walk on, placed on one side of a grade crossing in an area of Fayetteville, Arkansas, popular with pedestrians. It found the panels reduced trespassing overall in the area by 38 percent over several months. They have since been installed at some locations, such as the redesigned Breakneck Ridge station on Metro-North's Hudson Line in New York.

=== Fences ===
Some have called for fencing along known trespassing hot spots in order to prevent the number of pedestrian deaths. After several deaths in Villa Park, Illinois, safety advocates built fences at spots where people would often walk across train tracks.

=== GIS data in Google maps ===
In June 2015, the FRA announced a railway safety initiative with Google that would include the FRA’s GIS data into its mapping services. The data pinpoints the location of over 250,000 rail crossings in the United States. The FRA believes that providing the location of rail crossings in maps will enhance crossing safety by people who are using navigation systems while driving.

=== Motion-detection cameras ===
After two children were killed by a CSX train on a bridge near the Erie Canal, the bridge was fitted with motion-detection cameras which sent images to a security company. If the company detected somebody on the tracks, a message on the speaker said: “Warning: You are trespassing on private property and are in danger of being struck by a train. Leave the area immediately.”

=== Pedestrian bridge ===
Pedestrian bridges have been used to help prevent train pedestrian fatalities. After the 2005 death of a young boy, the city of San Jose, California built a pedestrian overpass.

== Education and awareness ==
=== Operation Lifesaver ===
Operation Lifesaver, a nonprofit association, was co-founded in the 1970s by Union Pacific Railroad, and has been criticized as having a pro-railroad agenda. In 2017, Operation Lifesaver, Inc. awarded $217,000 for rail safety public awareness campaigns in 15 states.

==== Criticism ====
Operation Lifesaver has been criticized for its strong ties to the railroad industry and the group's skew toward the railroad industry. The group also has been criticized for not focusing more on pedestrian railroad accidents. The industry has reduced its support of the group's efforts by providing fewer workers to help spread the group's safety message.

=== DuPage Railroad Safety Council ===
The DuPage Railroad Safety Council (DRSC) is a non-profit organization committed to preventing deaths and injuries at railroad crossings and along railways in DuPage County and all around the United States.

== See also ==
- List of common carrier freight railroads in the United States
- Rail suicide
- Rail transportation in the United States
- Transportation in the United States
- Outlaw (railroading jargon)
- fr:Accident de personne
