= Outlaws =

An outlaw is a person living outside the law.

Outlaws or The Outlaws may also refer to:

== Film and television ==
=== Film ===
- The Outlaws (1950 film), an Italian crime film
- Outlaws (1985 film), a French film
- The Outlaws (2017 film), a South Korean film
- Outlaws (2017 film), or 1%, an Australian film
- Outlaws (2021 film), a Spanish film
- The Out-Laws (film), a 2023 American film

=== Television ===
- Outlaws (1960 TV series), an American Western television series
- Outlaws (1986 TV series), an American action-adventure series
- Outlaws (2004 TV series), a British drama
- The Out-Laws (2012 TV series), the British title of the Flemish series Clan
- The Outlaws (2021 TV series), a British comedy crime series
- "Outlaws" (Lost), a 2005 episode

== Literature ==
- The Outlaws, characters in the Just William series of children's books by Richmal Crompton
- The Outlaws, a novel in The Bikers series by Richard Gordon
- The Outlaws, a novel in The Presidential Agent series by W. E. B. Griffin
- The Outlaws (comics), a team of super-villains in Marvel Comics
- The Outlaws (novel), a 1930 novel by Ernst von Salomon
- "The Outlaws", a short story by Ron Rash

== Music ==
- Wanted! The Outlaws, a 1976 compilation album of recordings by Waylon Jennings, Willie Nelson, Jessi Colter, and Tompall Glaser
- "Outlaws", a song by Green Day from the 2016 album Revolution Radio
- Outlaws (band), an American southern rock band
  - Outlaws (Outlaws album), the band's 1975 debut album
- The Outlaws (band), a 1960s English instrumental band
- Outlaws (Luke Doucet album), 2004
- Outlaws (Jeremy Steig and Eddie Gómez album), 1977
- Outlawz, an American rap group
- Texas Hippie Coalition, often referred to as "The Band of Outlaws"
  - Band of Outlaws the tenth studio album from American heavy metal band Texas Hippie Coalition

== Video games ==
- Outlaws (1985 video game), a shooter game for the Commodore 64
- Outlaws (1997 video game), a first-person shooter for the PC
- Houston Outlaws, an American professional eSports team in the Overwatch League
- Star Wars Outlaws, a Star Wars action-adventure game

== Sports ==
=== Bosnia and Herzegovina ===
- Outlaws, a subgroup of the organized Ultras group Horde Zla

=== United Kingdom ===
- Nottingham Outlaws (rugby league team), a National Division team
- Nottinghamshire County Cricket Club, known as Nottinghamshire Outlaws in limited overs competition

=== United States ===
- Arizona Outlaws, a former United States Football League team, also known as the Oklahoma Outlaws
- Austin Outlaws, a National Women's Football Association team
- Billings Outlaws, a former National Indoor Football League team
- Chico Outlaws, a former Golden Baseball League team
- Denver Outlaws (2006-2020), a former Major League Lacrosse team
- Denver Outlaws, a Premier Lacrosse League team
- Houston Outlaws (RFL team), a former professional football team from the Regional Football League
- Kansas City Outlaws, a former United Hockey League team
- Las Vegas Outlaws, a former professional football team from the XFL
- Las Vegas Outlaws (arena football), a former professional football team from the Arena Football League
- Nashville Outlaws, a former wooden bat summer collegiate baseball team of the Prospect League
- Pittsburgh Outlaws, a semi-professional football team that will join the American Arena League 2 in 2025
- Ventura County Outlaws, a rugby team in the Southern California Rugby Football Union

== Tag-team wrestling ==
- The New Age Outlaws, a professional wrestling tag-team
- The Texas Outlaws (original version), a former professional tag-team consisting of Dusty Rhodes and Dick Murdoch
- The Texas Outlaws, former tag-team champions in the United States Wrestling Association

== Other uses ==
- Outlaws Motorcycle Club

== See also ==
- Outlaw (disambiguation)
- The Outlaws of Sherwood
