= Dark Side of Black =

Studio album by Texas Hippie Coalition
- Released: April 22, 2016
- Recorded: 2016
- Studio: Boot Hill Studio (Corinth, Texas); Valve Studios (Dallas, Texas)
- Genre: Heavy metal; southern metal; groove metal; hard rock
- Length: 40:55
- Label: Carved Records
- Producer: Sterling Winfield

Texas Hippie Coalition chronology
Ride On (2014)	Dark Side of Black (2016)	High in the Saddle (2019)

Dark Side of Black is the fifth studio album by American heavy metal band Texas Hippie Coalition. It was released on April 22, 2016, via Carved Records.

== Track listing ==
All tracks are written by Big Dad Ritch, except where noted

No.	Title	Length
1.	"Come Get It" (Timmy Braun, Cord Pool, Ritch)	3:44
2.	"Angel Fall"	4:16
3.	"Shakin' Baby"	3:14
4.	"Knee Deep" (Braun, Pool, Ritch)	4:24
5.	"Villain"	3:14
6.	"Into the Wall"	3:27
7.	"Dark Side"	3:55
8.	"Rise" (Pool, Ritch)	4:10
9.	"Hit It Again" (Pool, Ritch)	7:19
10.	"Gods Are Angry"	3:12
Total length:		40:55

== Personnel ==
Credits are adapted from the album's liner notes.

Texas Hippie Coalition

- Big Dad Ritch − vocals
- John Exall − bass
- Cord Pool − guitars
- Timmy Braun − drums

Production

- Sterling Winfield − producer, engineering, mixing
- Brad Blackwood − mastering
- Jason Harter − design
- Drift Markus − photography

== Charts ==
Chart (2012)	Peak position
US Heatseekers Albums	2
US Independent Albums	18
US Hard Rock Albums	6
US Top Rock Albums	26
