= Band of Outlaws =

Studio album by Texas Hippie Coalition
- Released: September 11, 2026
- Genre: Heavy metal
- Length: 35:00
- Label: Bigdadrecords / Vanity Music Group
- Producer: Steve Chadie

Texas Hippie Coalition chronology
Stoned Cowboys (2026)	Band of Outlaws (2026)

Band of Outlaws is the tenth studio album by American red dirt metal band Texas Hippie Coalition. Released on September 11, 2026, the album was published by Bigdadrecords, the band's own record label.

== Critical reception ==
Richard Rosenthal of Screamer Magazine portrayed the compilation as "the red dirt metal, bone-crushing style that fans are accustomed to".

Brave Words & Bloody Knuckles described the album as "the southern fried Texas red dirt metal you've come to expect from the band and like good bourbon, it's only getting better with age".

== Track listing ==
No.	Title	Length
1.	"Keep It Nasty"	3:47
2.	"Ruff Rider"	3:07
3.	"Band Of Outlaws"	3:04
4.	"Lone Star State Line"	3:42
5.	"Burning It Down"	3:00
6.	"The Winds"	3:15
7.	"Outlo"	4:14
8.	"Burnt & Tattered"	3:55
9.	"Stomping Mudholes"	3:16
10.	"Just Like Johnny Cash"	3:40
Total length:		35:00
