= Manitoba Great Northern Railway =

Historic Canadian railway

The Manitoba Great Northern Railway was a historic Canadian railway that operated in Manitoba.

The railway was incorporated on March 10, 1909, to purchase the right-of-way and tracks of the Midland Railway of Manitoba between Gretna at the International Boundary and Portage la Prairie, as well as between Morden and the International Boundary.

The railway sold its lines to the city of Winnipeg and the line from Winnipeg to Noyes was acquired by the Canadian National Railway, although the GN maintained trackage rights.

Today, the lines once operated by the Manitoba Great Northern make up the Burlington Northern Santa Fe Manitoba, a BNSF Railway subsidiary railroad.
