= Gunsmoke (Texas Hippie Coalition album) =

Studio album by Texas Hippie Coalition
- Released: October 4, 2024
- Studios: Bell Labs, Oklahoma
- Genres: Heavy metal; southern metal; groove metal; hard rock
- Length: 35:44
- Label: MNRK Music Group
- Producer: Trent Bell

Texas Hippie Coalition chronology
The Name Lives On (2023)	Gunsmoke (2024)	Stoned Cowboys (2026)

Gunsmoke is the eighth studio album by American heavy metal band Texas Hippie Coalition. It was released on October 4, 2024, through MNRK Music Group.

== Reception ==
Brave Words & Bloody Knuckles stated that "This time, [frontman] Big Dad Ritch and his crew wholeheartedly embrace their country and Southern rock stylings as well as a lifelong passion for westerns", and that "This comes through loud and clear on the first single and title track, 'Gunsmoke'". The author goes on to say that "Rustic acoustic guitar crawls through a stomping beat punctuated by waves of groaning distortion".

Larry Petro of KNAC stated that "The wild riffing tosses and turns of 'Bones Jones' – a story about 'a local entrepreneur' according to Ritch – is also a strong heavy groove-ridden number chock full of riffs and colorful narration lived and sung by the man who knew the real-life character", continuing to profess that "Even openers 'Deadman' and 'Baptized In The Mud' are the perfect autobiographical anthems that sum up the essence of THC, further highlighting their red dirt metal beginnings".

== Track listing ==
No.	Title	Length
1.	"Deadman"	3:14
2.	"Baptized in the Mud"	3:29
3.	"Bones Jones"	3:38
4.	"She's Like a Song"	4:22
5.	"Droppin' Bombs"	3:33
6.	"Gunsmoke"	3:41
7.	"Eat Crow"	3:22
8.	"Million Man Army"	3:40
9.	"Test Positive"	3:16
10.	"I'm Gettin' High"	3:29
Total length:		35:44
