= Operation Lifesaver =

United States rail safety organization

Operation Lifesaver is a 501(c)(3) educational organization in the United States dedicated to promoting safety at railroad grade crossings and railroad rights-of-way.

Operation Lifesaver is the largest rail safety education organization in the United States. It was founded by the Union Pacific Railroad in the early 1970s.

== History ==
In 1972, the Idaho State Police, then-Governor Cecil Andrus and the Union Pacific Railroad mounted campaign to promote "Stop, Look and Listen" safety at highway-rail grade crossings. The initial teams spoke to civic groups, school groups, school bus and truck drivers. Idaho experienced a 43% reduction in fatalities that first year.

In 2022, Operation Lifesaver celebrated 50 years of rail safety education.

Operation Lifesaver has trained instructors and authorized volunteer speakers who provide free rail safety education programs across the U.S. and abroad. They give free presentations to school groups, driver education classes, community members, professional drivers, law enforcement officers, and emergency responders. Their programs are co-sponsored by federal, state and local government agencies, highway safety organizations and America's railroad systems.

== Campaigns ==
In 2006, Operation Lifesaver requested that Disney edit a scene of the Pixar film Cars in which the character of Lightning McQueen races a train to a grade crossing while the crossing lights are flashing. Disney/Pixar removed the scene in question from theater showings, but the DVD release of the movie still included the scene. Disney/Pixar created a series of PSAs featuring Lightning McQueen to promote safe driving habits.

On October 14, 2016, Operation Lifesaver requested via a Facebook post that Hollister Co. remove advertisements from their website showing teenagers walking on railroad tracks. Hollister removed the advertisements five days later on October 19.

In September 2017, Operation Lifesaver spearheaded the observance of Rail Safety Week across the U.S. to raise awareness of the need for caution near railroad tracks and property.

In 2018, Operation Lifesaver Canada, which had been holding rail safety week observances for years, aligned its Rail Safety Week dates to coincide with the U.S. observance.

In 2024, Operation Lifesaver, Inc. renamed its observance of Rail Safety Week to See Tracks? Think Train® Week (ST3Week for short) throughout the U.S. to better represent what the week-long observance is all about:

- Preventing railroad crossing and trespass incidents 
- Concentrating public attention on the need for rail safety education

== Criticism ==
Operation Lifesaver has been criticized for its strong ties to the railroad industry and the group's skew toward the railroad industry, despite its life saving message. The industry has reduced its support of the group's efforts by providing fewer workers to help spread the group's safety message. The group has also been criticized for not doing enough to support pedestrian railroad safety in the United States.

== Gallery ==
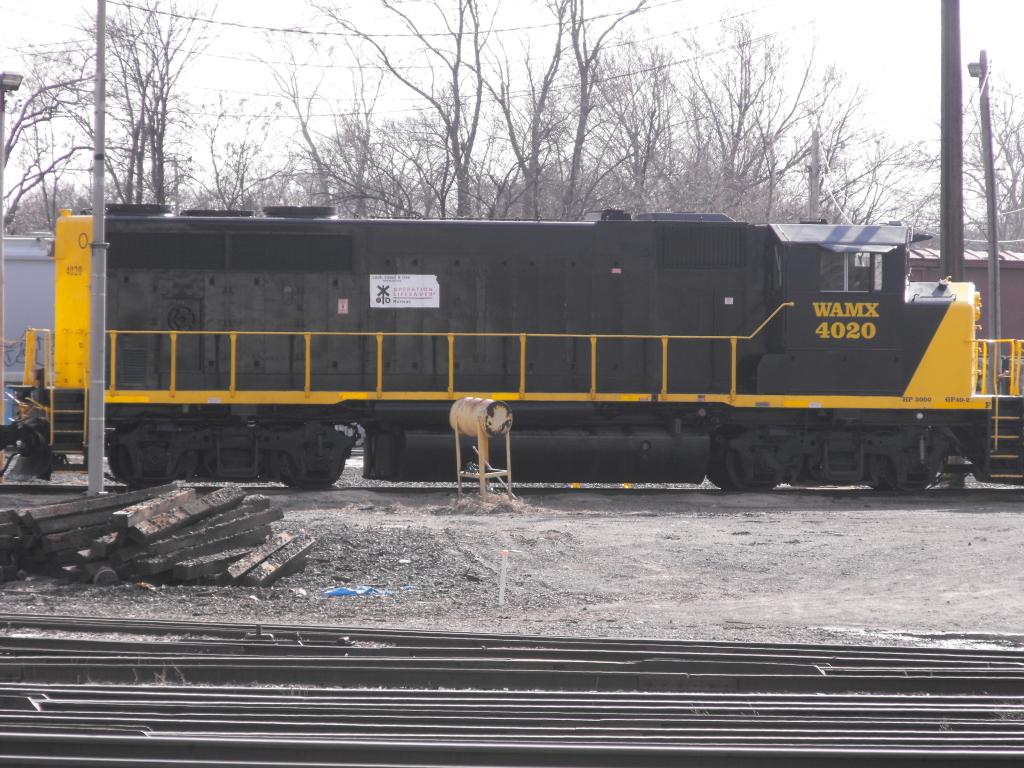
WAMX #4020 with an Operation Lifesaver Kansas sticker.

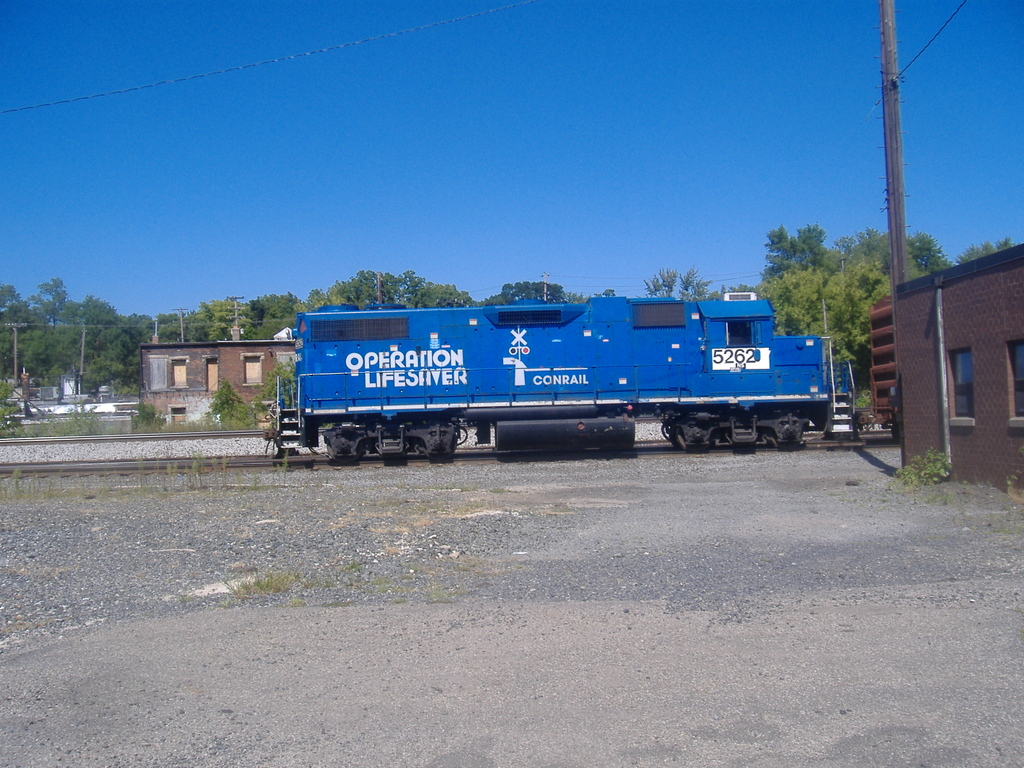
NS #5262 (ex-Conrail) with Operation Lifesaver paint scheme.

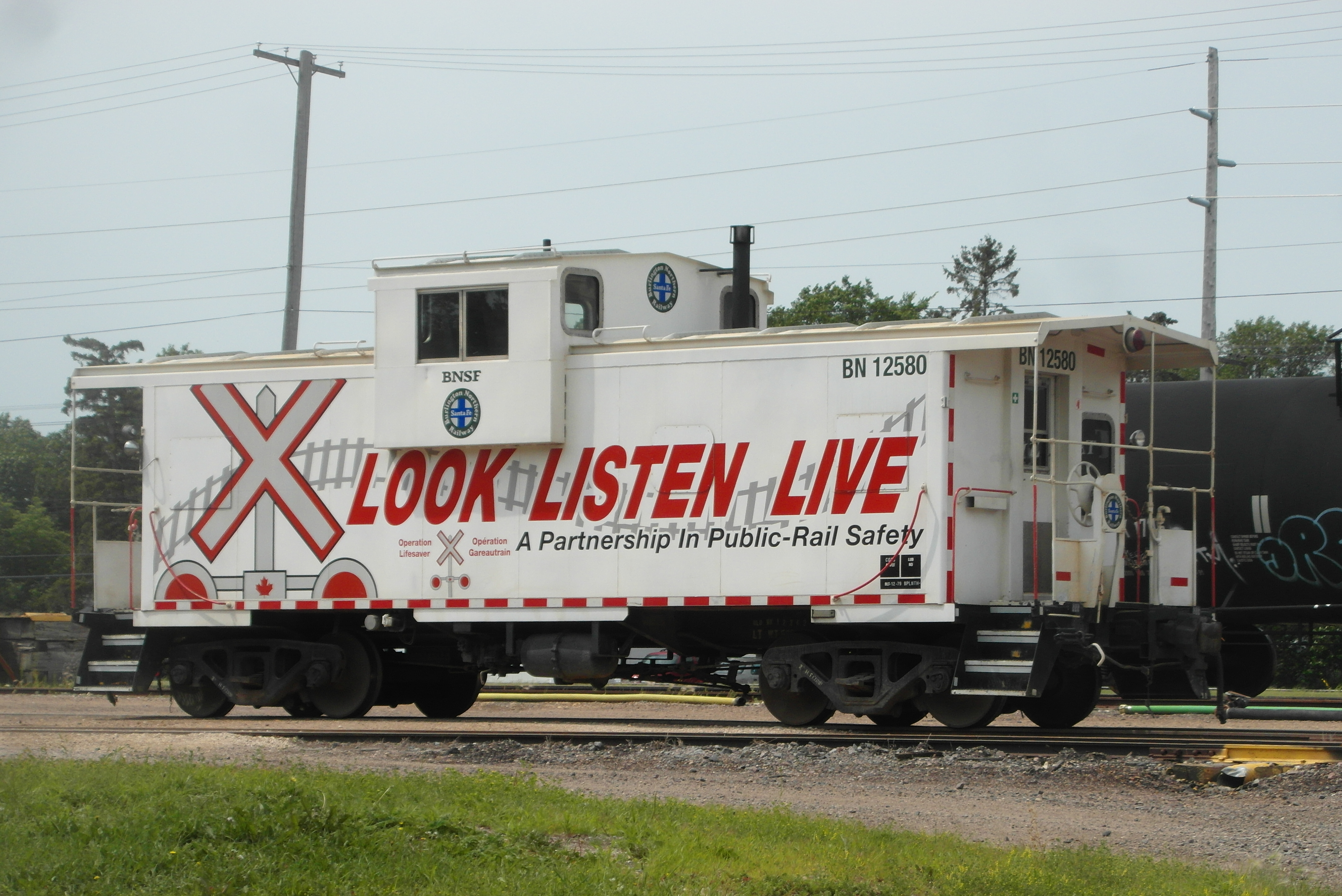
BNSF Manitoba Caboose (BN 12580) with Operation Lifesaver Canada paint scheme.

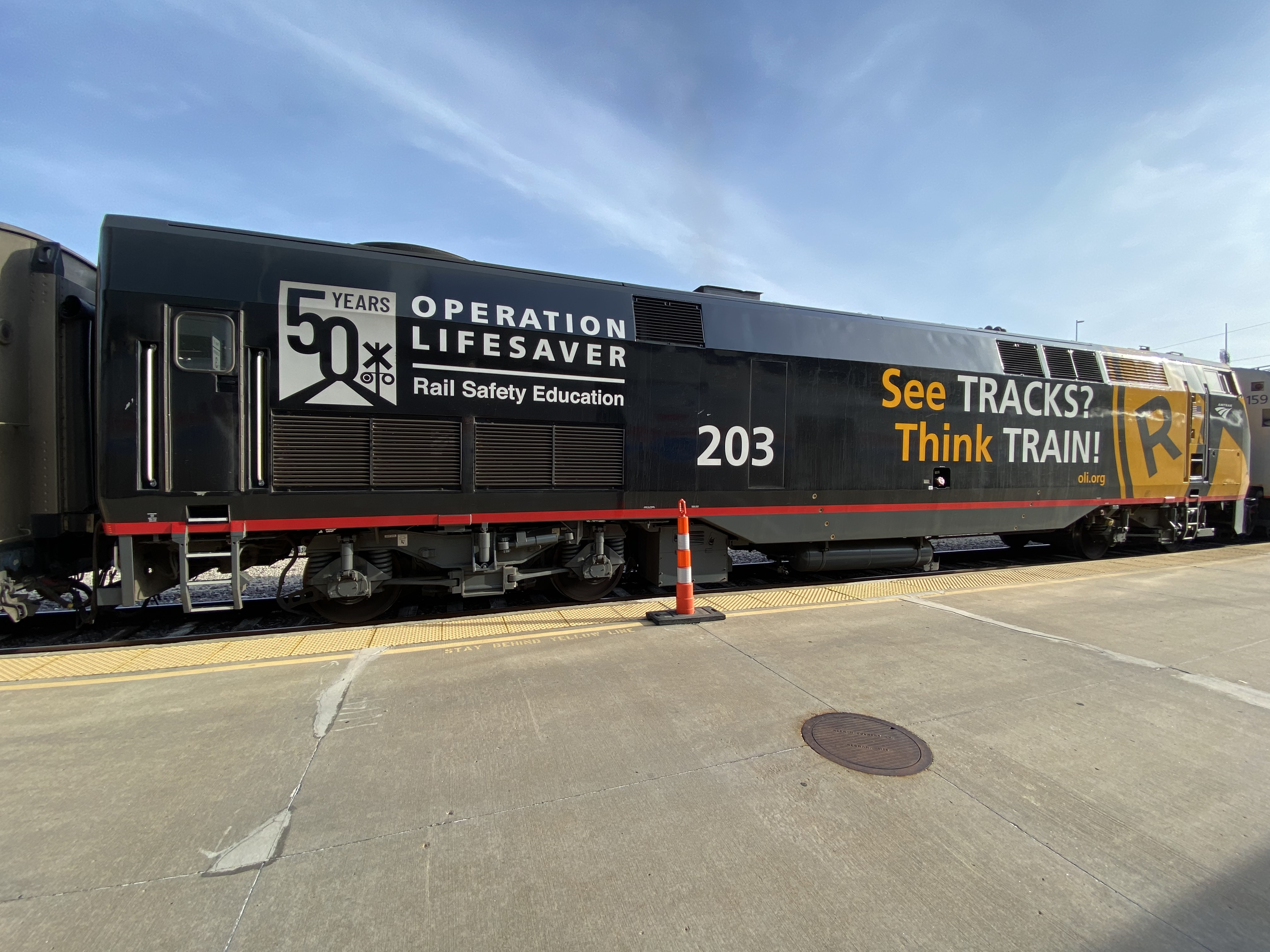
Amtrak #203 with an "Operation Lifesaver" paint scheme.

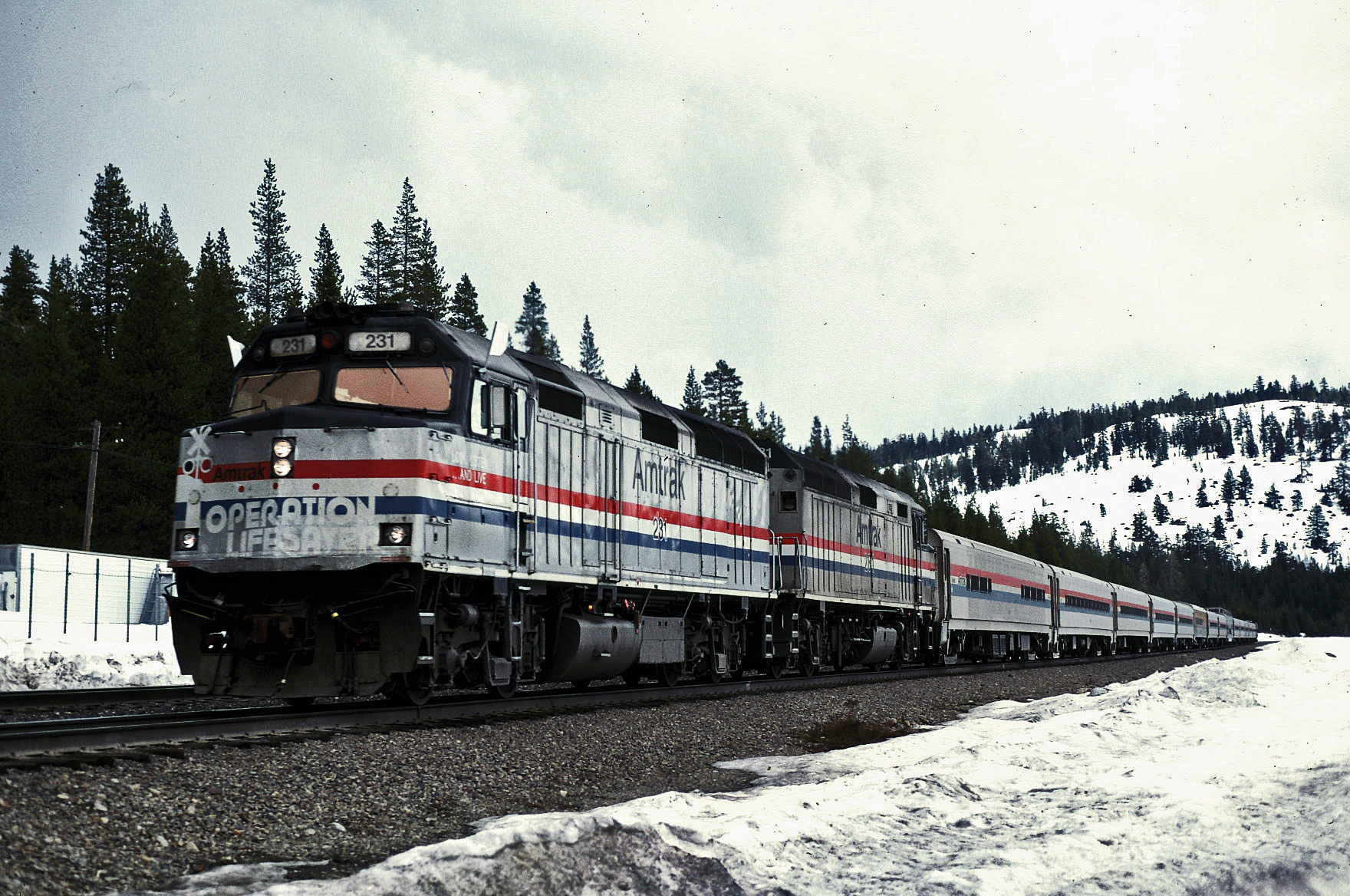
Amtrak #231 with Operation Lifesaver markings.
