= High in the Saddle =

Studio album by Texas Hippie Coalition
- Released: May 31, 2019
- Genres: Heavy metal; southern metal; groove metal; hard rock
- Length: 39:11
- Label: Entertainment One Music
- Producer: Bob Marlette

Texas Hippie Coalition chronology
Dark Side of Black (2016)	High in the Saddle (2019)	The Name Lives On (2023)

High in the Saddle is the sixth studio album by American heavy metal band Texas Hippie Coalition. It was released on May 31, 2019, and is the band's first album released through Entertainment One Music. It is the only album with drummer Devon Carothers.

== Background ==
On March 29, 2019, the first single from the album, "Moonshine", was released.

== Track listing ==
Adapted from Infrared Magazine.

No.	Title	Writer(s)	Length
1.	"Moonshine"	Richard Anderson; Cord Pool	4:43
2.	"Dirty Finger"	Anderson; Pool	4:21
3.	"Bring It Baby"	Anderson; Nevada Romo	3:29
4.	"Ride or Die"	Anderson; Bob Marlette; Daniel "Sahaj" Ticotin	3:39
5.	"Tongue Like a Devil"	Anderson; Marlette; Pool	3:30
6.	"Why Aren't You Listening"	Anderson; Marlette; Ticotin	3:50
7.	"Stevie Nicks"	Anderson; Pool	4:26
8.	"BullsEye"	Anderson; N. Romo	4:17
9.	"Tell It from the Ground"	Anderson; N. Romo	3:41
10.	"Blue Lights On"	Anderson; N. Romo	3:15
Total length:			39:11

== Personnel ==
Texas Hippie Coalition

- Big Dad Ritch – lead vocals
- Cord Pool – lead guitar
- Nevada Romo – rhythm guitar, backing vocals
- Larado Romo – bass (all except 4–6), backing vocals
- Devon Carothers – drums (all except 4–6)

Additional musicians

- Bob Marlette – bass (4–6), production
- Chris Marlette – drums (4–6)
