= The Name Lives On =

Studio album by Texas Hippie Coalition
- Released: April 21, 2023
- Genre: Heavy metal; southern metal; groove metal; hard rock
- Length: 36:25
- Label: MNRK Music Group
- Producer: Bob Marlette

Texas Hippie Coalition chronology
High in the Saddle (2019)	The Name Lives On (2023)	Gunsmoke (2024)

The Name Lives On is the seventh studio album by American heavy metal band Texas Hippie Coalition. It was released on April 21, 2023, via MNRK Music Group.

== Critical reception ==
Blabbermouth stated that the work is "jam-packed with unabashed, dirty, groovy party-rock" going on to say that "it's the kind of album meant to be cranked while sitting on the porch on a hot summer day, drinking moonshine and hanging with friends".

The Rockpit reviewed the album, indicating that "The hard-hitting, 10-track collection is another riff-heavy, sonic assault from beginning to end".

== Track listing ==
No.	Title	Writer(s)	Length
1.	"Hell Hounds"	Richard Anderson; Cord Pool	3:48
2.	"I Come from the Dirt"	Anderson; Nevada Romo	3:07
3.	"Built for the Road"	Anderson; N. Romo	3:23
4.	"Scream"	Anderson; Larado Romo	3:40
5.	"Hard Habit"	Anderson; Bob Marlette	3:41
6.	"Believe"	Anderson; Marlette	3:53
7.	"License to Kill"	Anderson; N. Romo	3:48
8.	"Keep My Name Out of Your Mouth"	Anderson; N. Romo	3:28
9.	"I Teach Angels How to Fly"	Anderson; Marlette	3:57
10.	"The Name Lives On"	Anderson; L. Romo	3:40
Total length:			36:25

== Personnel ==
Texas Hippie Coalition

- Big Dad Ritch – lead vocals
- Cord Pool – lead guitar, backing vocals
- Nevada Romo – rhythm guitar, backing vocals
- Larado Romo – bass, backing vocals
- Joey Mandigo – drums
