= Burlington Northern Santa Fe Manitoba =

Burlington Northern Santa Fe Manitoba (BNSF Manitoba) is a Canadian subsidiary railroad of the BNSF Railway, which operates in Winnipeg, Manitoba.

== Equipment ==
BNSF Manitoba uses a single EMD GP locomotive. The company uses a single caboose with the reporting mark BN 12580. It has a bilingual Operation Lifesaver paint scheme, reminding motorists to Look, Listen, Live. They also have a few trucks used to move the switchman around, and move maintenance crews around, and they have maintenance of way vehicles to maintain their tracks.

== History ==
This railway traces its history to the Midland Railway of Manitoba which was incorporated in 1903 and built various lines around Winnipeg. The operations of the company were acquired by the Manitoba Great Northern Railway, a subsidiary of the Great Northern Railway (GN) on July 1, 1909.

The lines were sold by the GN to the city of Winnipeg, except for the following sections:

- line from the CN mainline at Lindsay Street and Taylor Avenue to McPhillips Avenue
- Winnipeg yard trackage

The line to the Canada–United States border at Noyes, Minnesota, was sold to the Canadian National Railway (CN), although the GN maintained trackage rights over it to access its tracks in Winnipeg.

After the GN was merged into the Burlington Northern Railroad in 1970, the name of the MGNR was changed to Burlington Northern Manitoba Ltd. (BNML) in 1971. The last name change was to Burlington Northern Santa Fe (Manitoba) took place in 1999, following the merger of the BNSF Railway in 1996.

There are currently seven employees: train crew having four, and maintenance of way having three.

== Trackage ==
BNSF owns tracks from the CN Rivers Subdivision near Lindsay St, to Academy Rd and from north of Portage Ave to Pacific Ave. Along the line is their engine house and ADM industry between Taylor Ave to Grant Ave, and a yard from Grant Ave to Corydon Ave. At the north end of the track, there are a couple more industries. BNSF has trackage rights on the CPKC La Riviere Subdivision between Academy Rd to just north of Portage Avenue, and the CNR Rivers Subdivision between Lindsay St, and Fort Rouge Yard. BNSF also has trackage rights on the entire CN Letellier Sub, usually just used for switching cars at the CN Fort Rouge Yard.

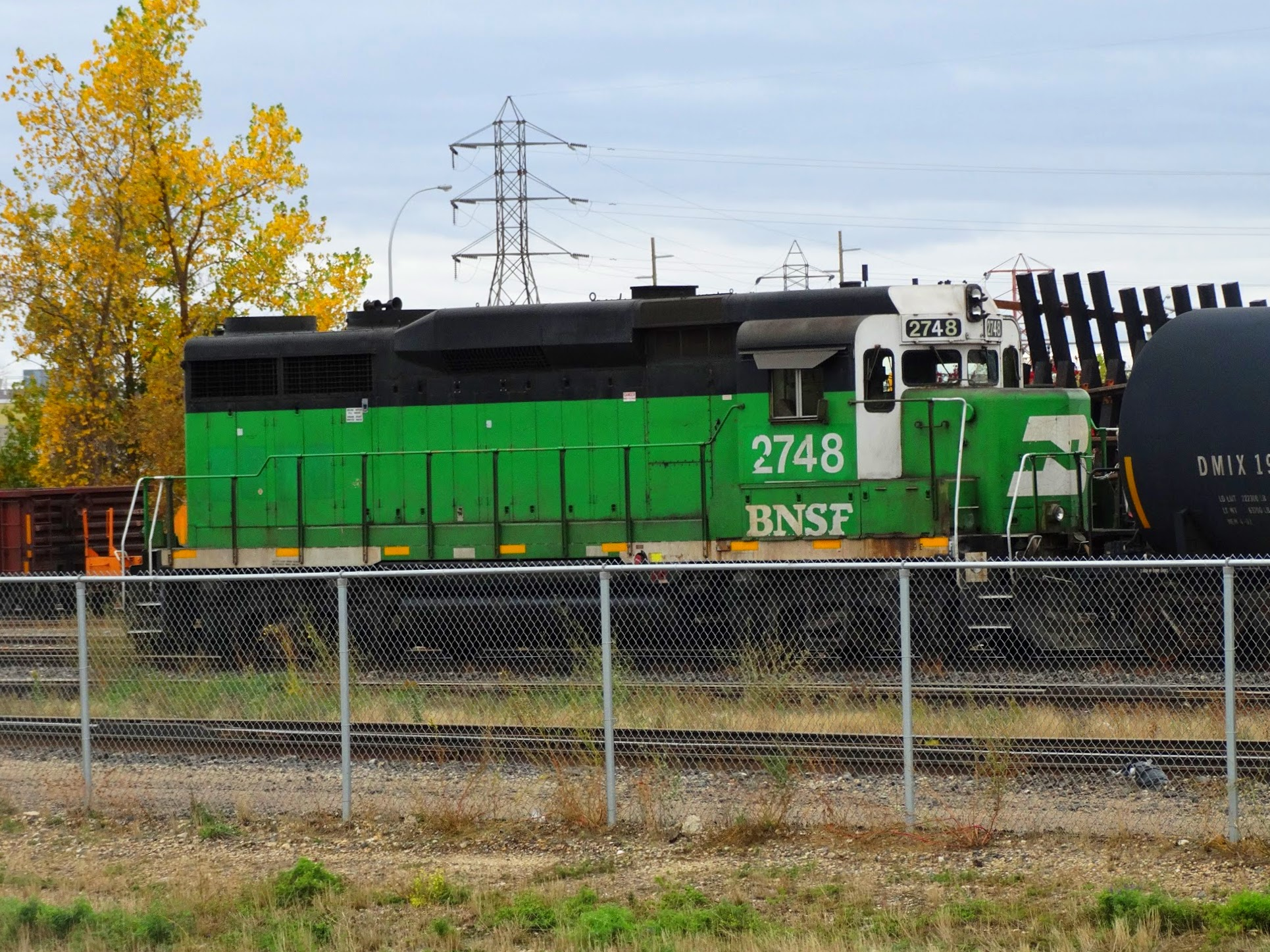
BNSF 2748 at CN's Fort Rouge Yard

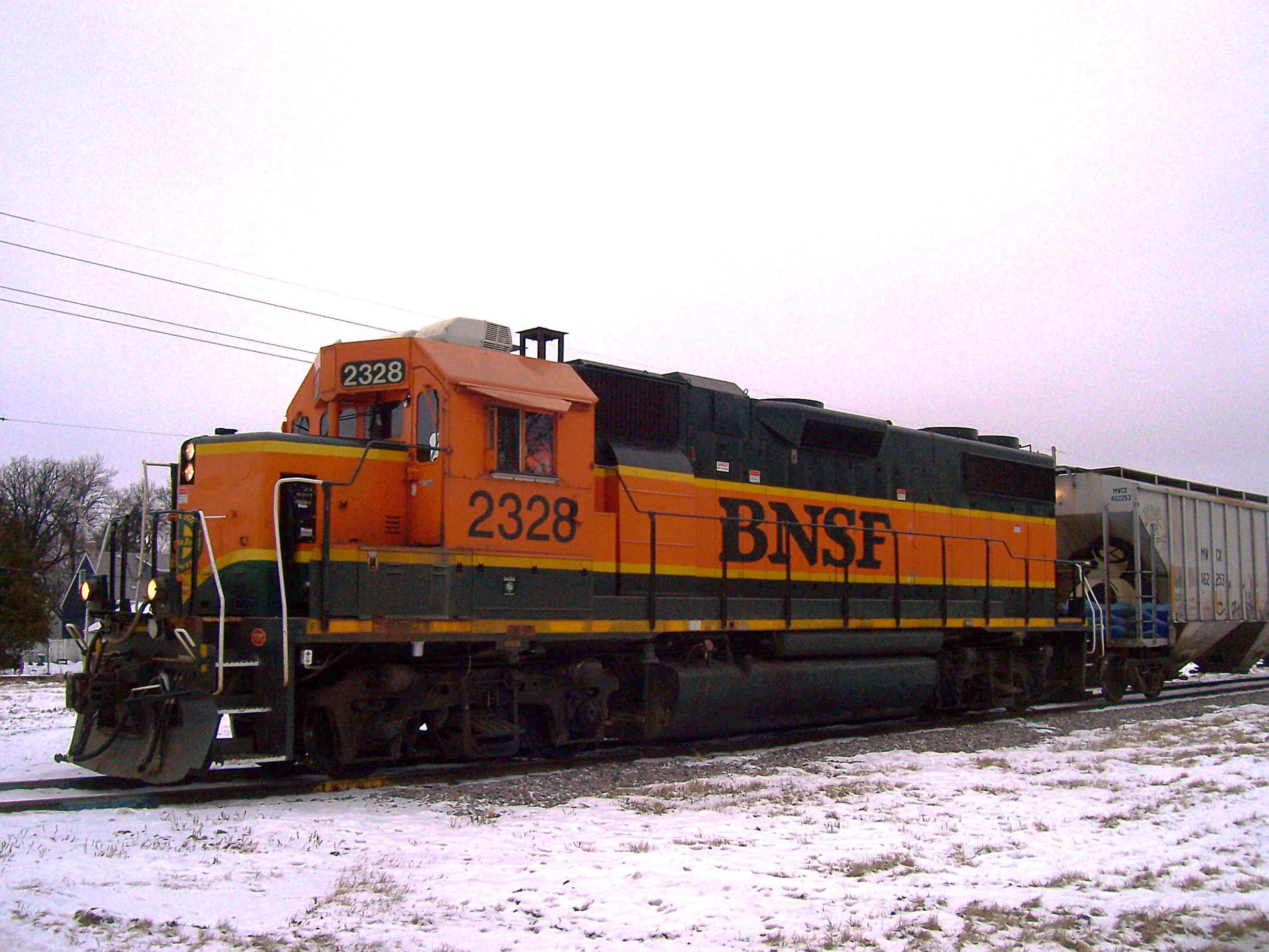
BNSF 2328 hauling a train south for BNSF Manitoba

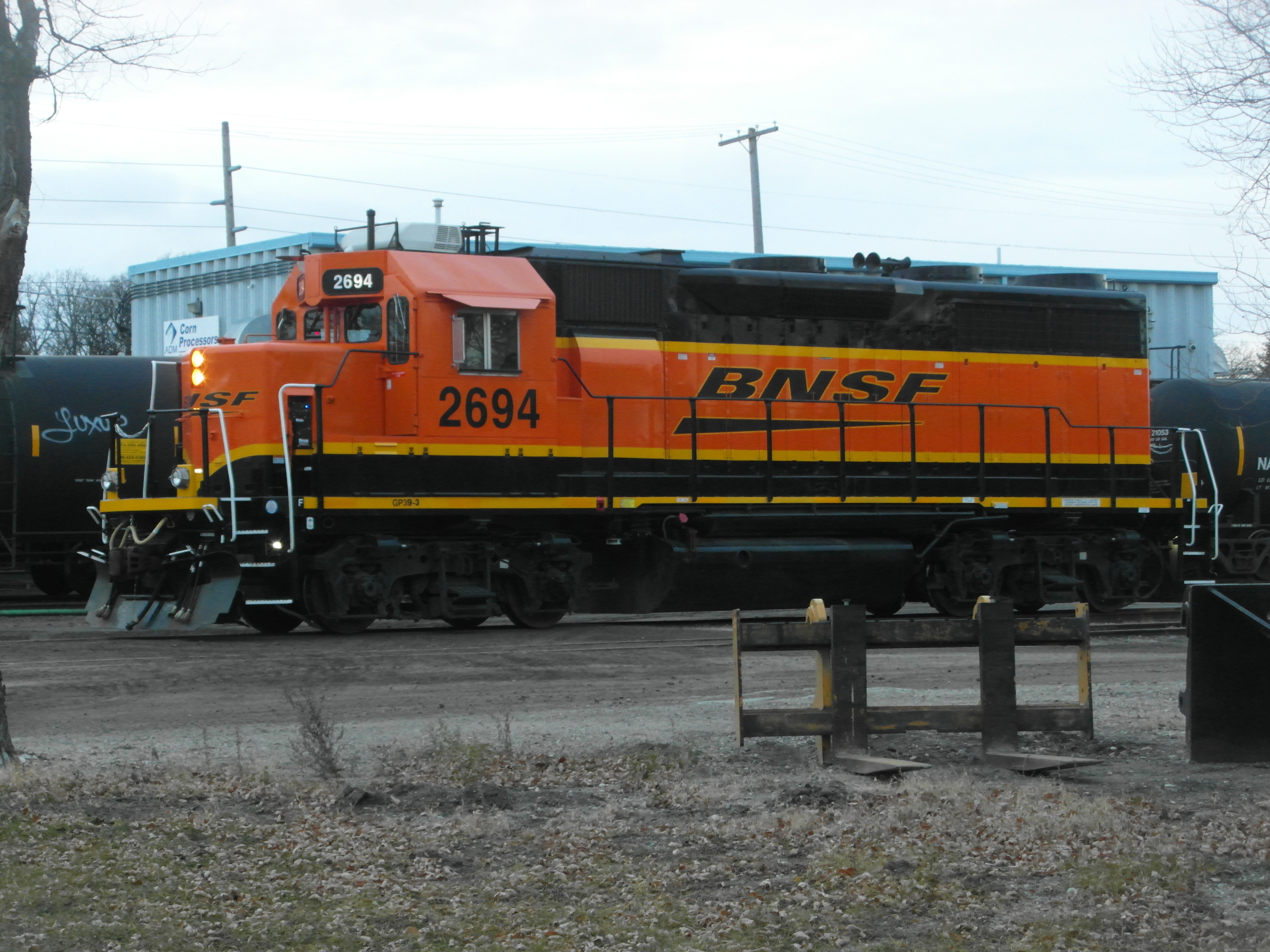
BNSF 2694 in the BNSF Winnipeg Yard

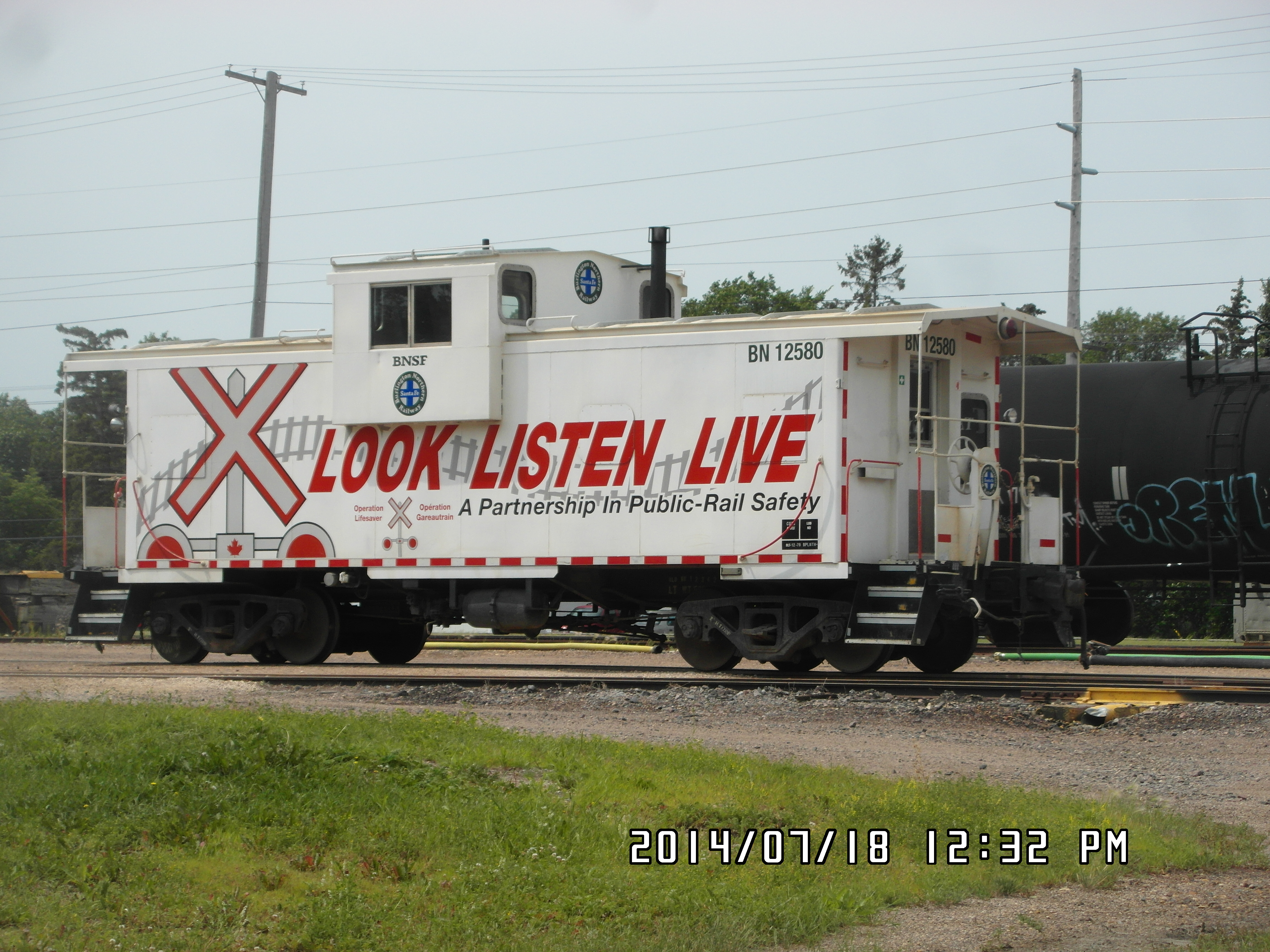
BNSF Manitoba Caboose

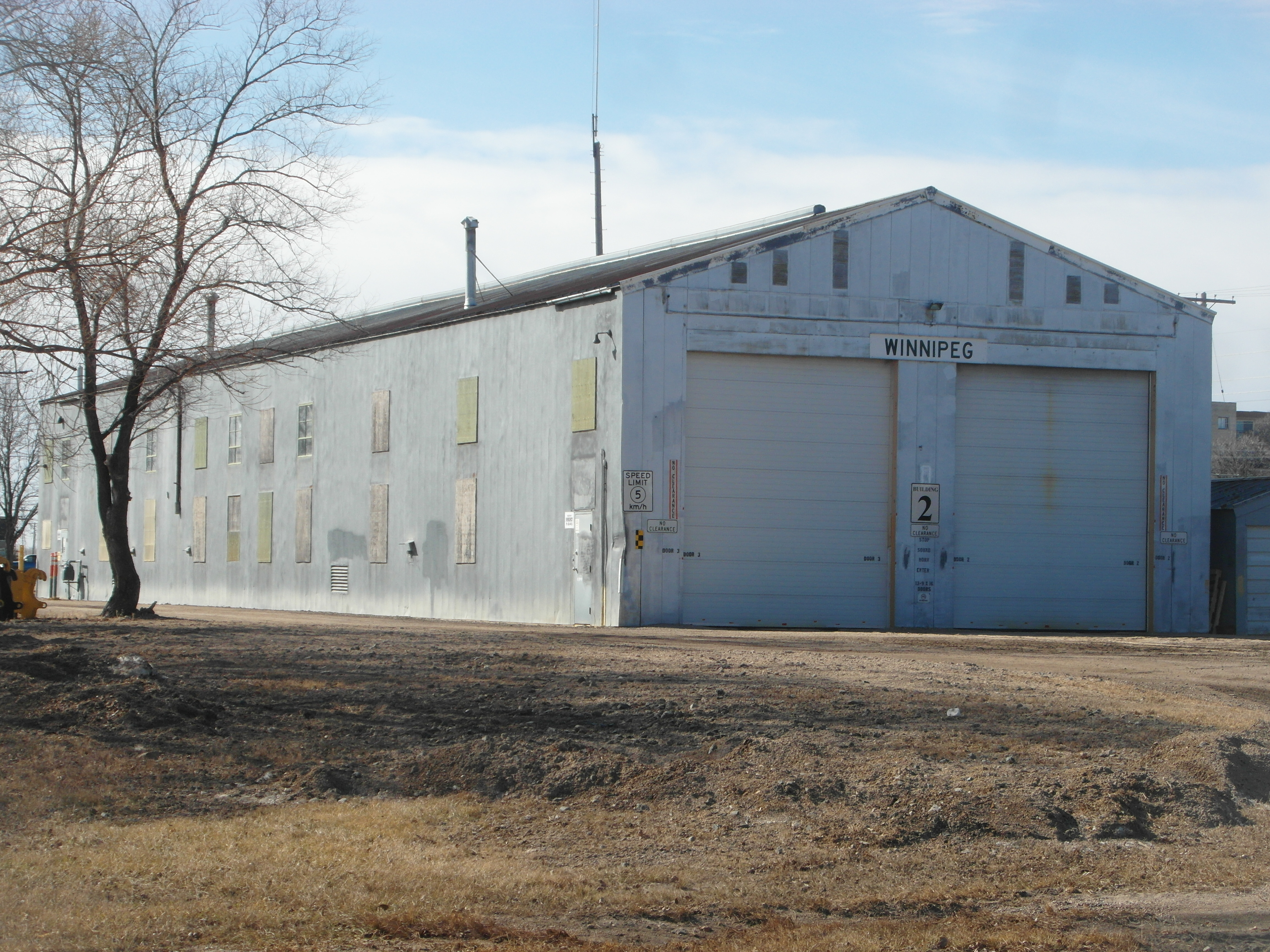
Engine House for the locomotive and caboose

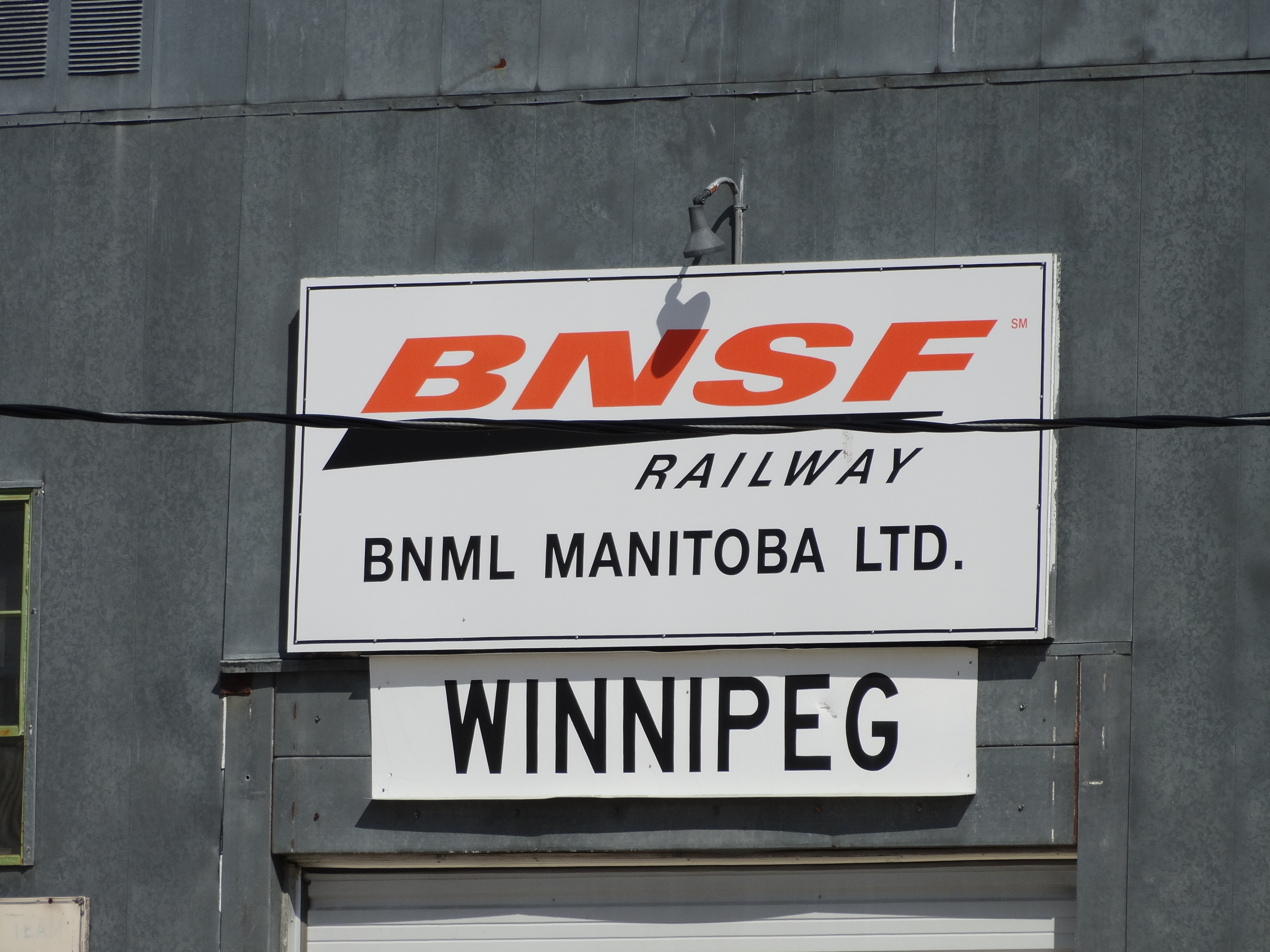
BNSF Winnipeg Station Name Sign

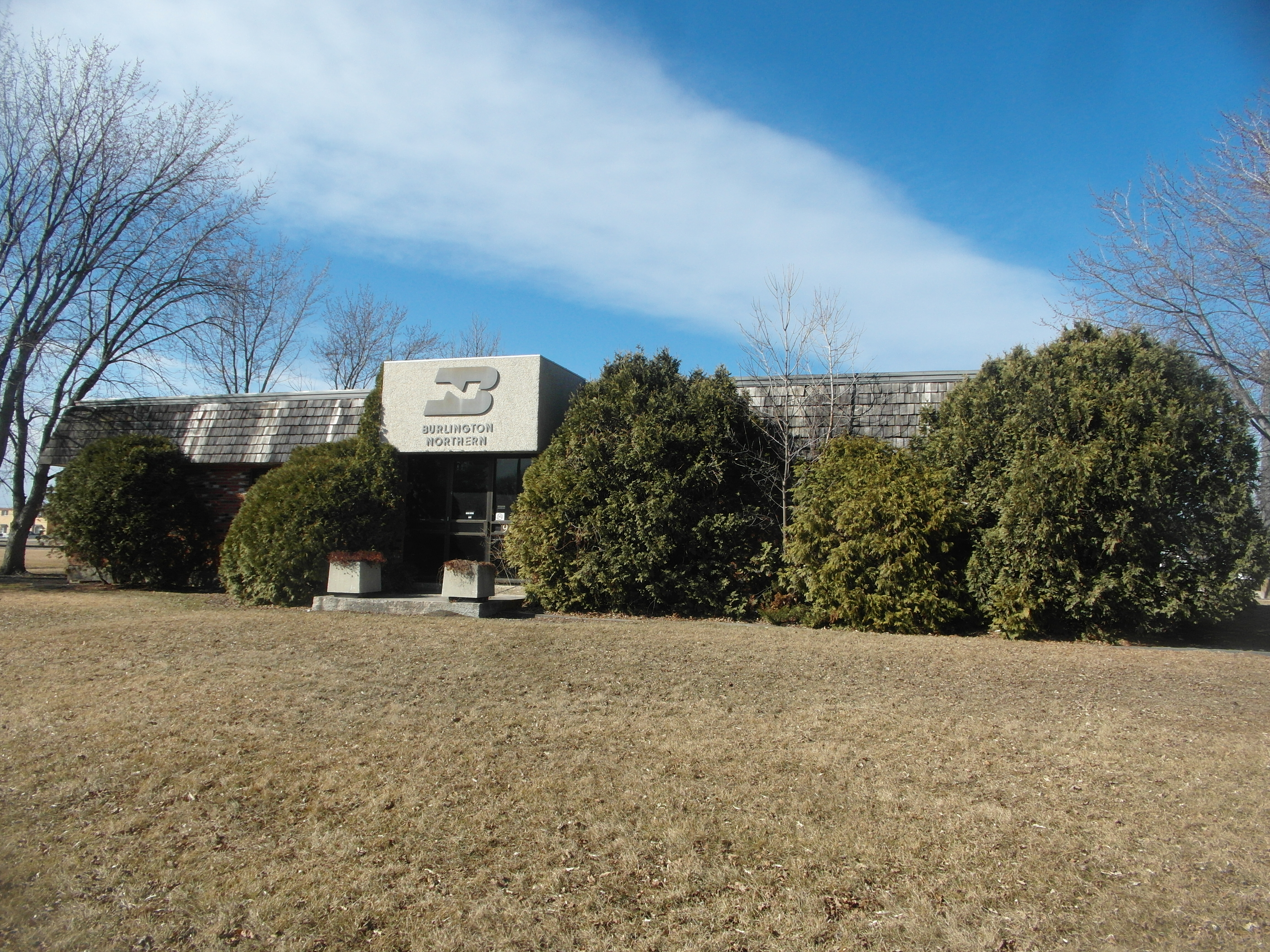
BN Office on Lindsay Ave

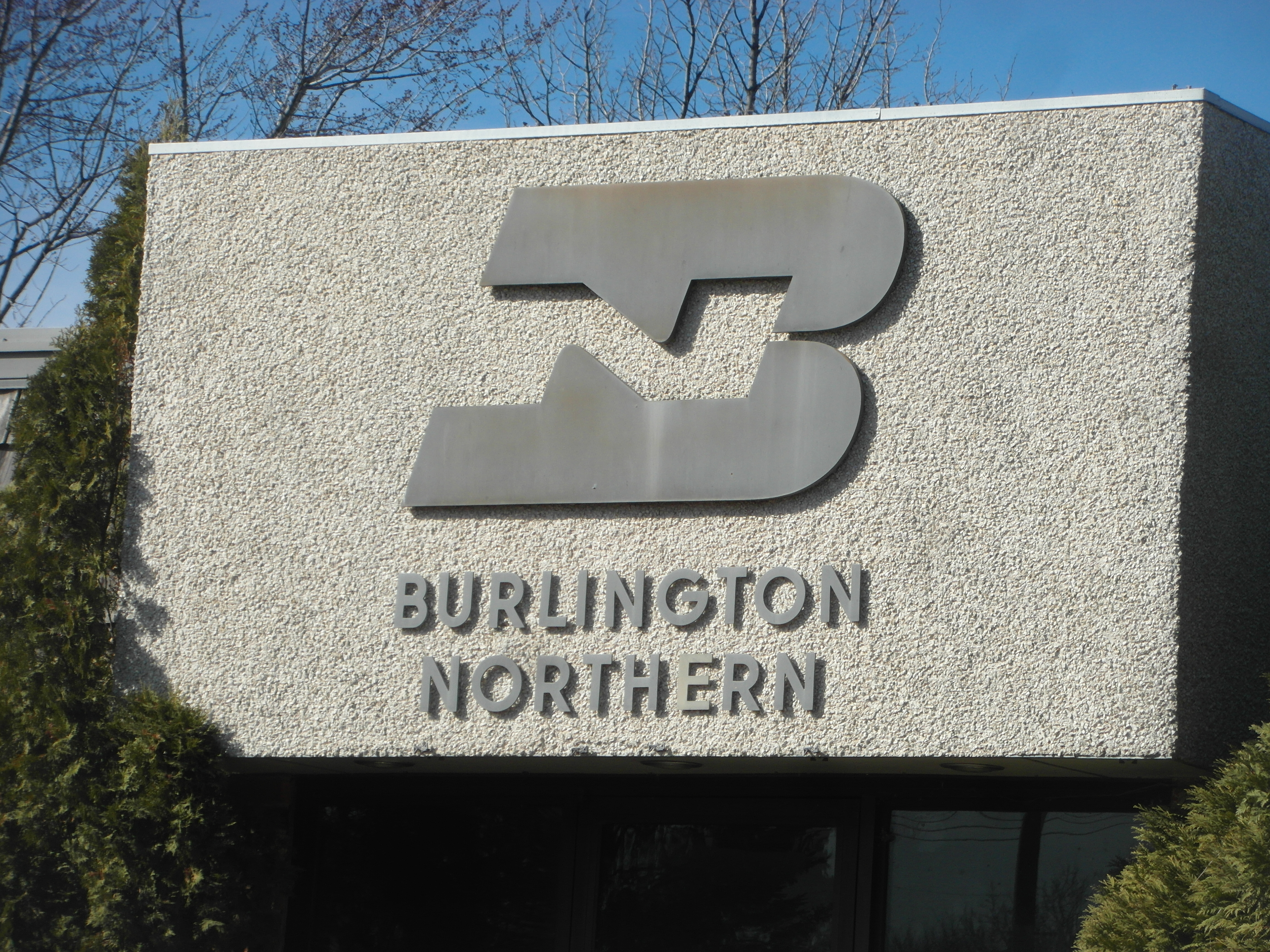
Logo on the Office
