= Pride of Texas =

Studio album by Texas Hippie Coalition
- Released: February 12, 2008
- Genre: Heavy metal; southern metal; groove metal; hard rock
- Length: 43:15
- Label: Independent
- Producer: David Prater

Texas Hippie Coalition chronology
Pride of Texas (2008)	Rollin' (2010)

Pride of Texas is the first studio album by American metal band Texas Hippie Coalition. It was released on February 12, 2008.

== Production ==
The album was produced by David Prater, and was mastered by David Zycheck at Largemouth Recording Studio.

== Composition ==
"Clenched Fist", the second song on the album, is dedicated to guitarist Darrell "Dimebag" Abbott, who was a significant influence on the band.

== Reception ==
Mark Allen of Hardrock Haven called Pride of Texas the album that added Texas Hippie Coalition to the list of southern metal artists. Cuttingedgerocks.com called the work an "attack of blasting guitar, thumping drums and mind-wearing bass coupled with muscle driven intoxicated lyrics from a gargantuan with fitting gumpture and vocals".

== Track listing ==
Pride of Texas track listing
No.	Title	Length
1.	"No Shame"	3:32
2.	"Clenched Fist"	4:35
3.	"Pissed Off and Mad About It"	4:05
4.	"Troublesome Times"	5:00
5.	"Drug Dealer"	4:06
6.	"Texas Tags"	3:41
7.	"Leavin'"	4:24
8.	"Crawlin'"	2:29
9.	"Closure"	5:49
10.	"Riverbottom"	5:34
Total length:		43:15

== Personnel ==
- John Exall – bass
- Randy Cooper – guitars
- Big Dad Ritch – lead vocals
- Michael Hayes – guitars
- Scott "Cowboy" Lytle – drums
