= Randy Cooper =

American guitarist

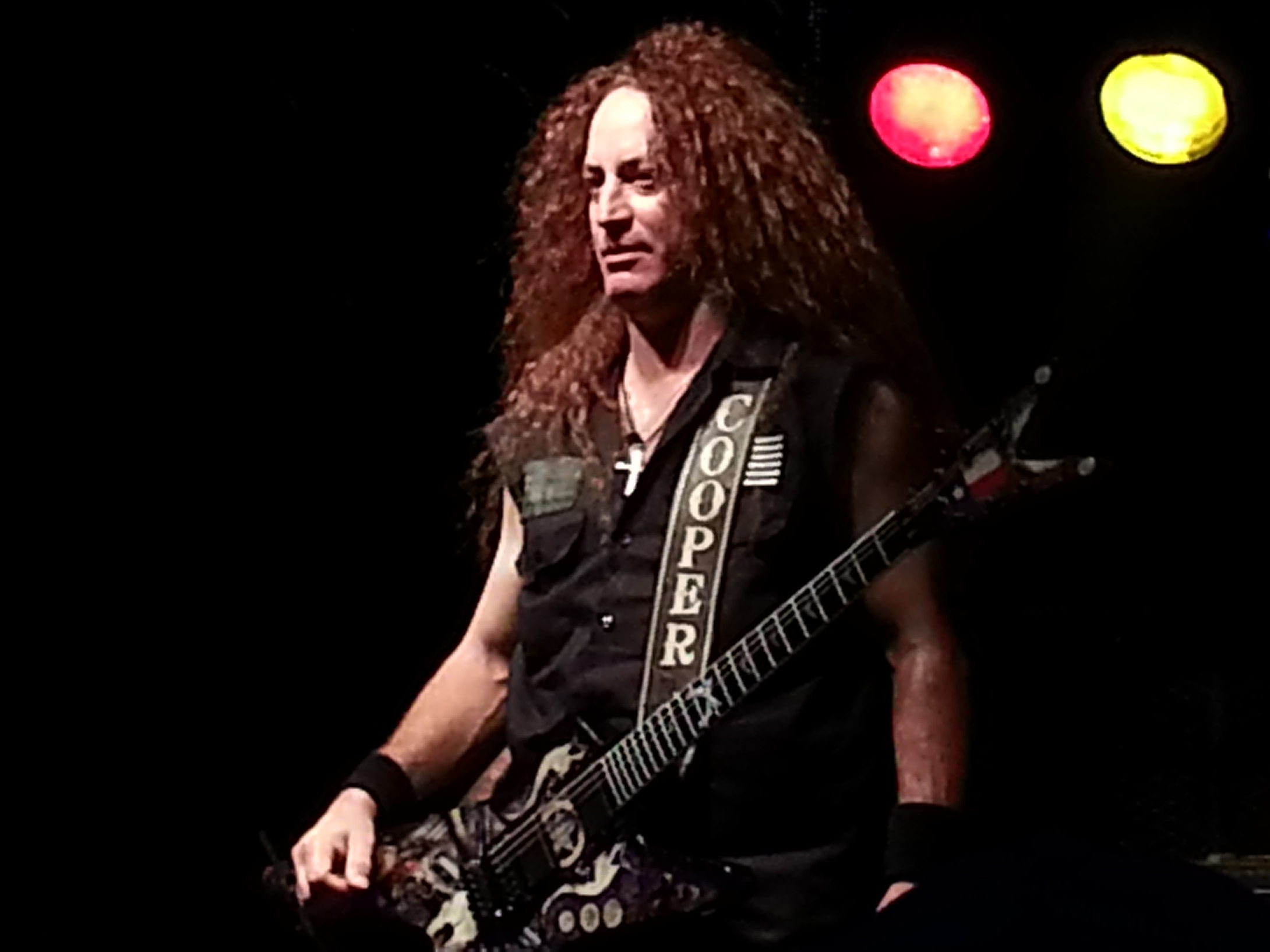

Background information
- Born: c. 1967
- Genres: Heavy metal, hard rock
- Occupation: Musician
- Instrument: Guitar
- Years active: 1989–present
- Formerly of: Texas Hippie Coalition; Emperors and Elephants; Shotgun Rebellion; Scattered Hamlet

Randy "The Arsonist" Cooper (born c. 1967) is the former guitarist for American rock band Emperors and Elephants as well as American red dirt metal band Texas Hippie Coalition. Cooper also acted as a session guitarist on American southern rock band Shotgun Rebellion's debut album Train of Pain in addition to performing on a limited number of dates with the band.

== History ==
Cooper moved to Denison, Texas when he was 16 years. he became attracted to Dean Guitars, and played the same Vintage 82 DEAN from 1989 until at least 2009. In 1991, an automobile accident in Oklahoma City turned the guitarist into a quadriplegic, confining him to a wheelchair and forcing him to regain his stride. After regaining motion in his right arm and both legs, Cooper spent additional time in rehab, recovering only one finger on his left hand. This contributes to the musician's unique style of playing.

== Texas Hippie Coalition ==
In mid-2012, Cooper tore a tendon in his right arm, which required extensive rehabilitation. With a pair of cysts under his arm that encircled the tendons, he could only play guitar for a few minutes at a time, which rendered him unable to tour later that year.

== Departure from Texas Hippie Coalition ==
Following Cooper's departure from Texas Hippie Coalition, the veteran guitarist joined rock band Emperors and Elephants. Additionally, Cooper performed a select number of tour dates with southern rock band Shotgun Rebellion while assisting the ensemble with their debut studio album. Randy Cooper's work also includes a guest appearance on Hell Rider Recording Artist, Scattered Hamlet's debut full length, Skeleton Dixie, where he played lead guitar on "Falling Off the Wagon.". He's also been known to make unannounced guest appearances with the band to play that song live.

In October 2015, it was announced that Emperors and Elephants would begin the new year by starting work on a new album with producer Scott Wilson. Two months later, Cooper and the band announced that they had decided to part ways.

In 2016, Cooper performed a show with American rock band Coming Up Zero. In 2018, the guitarist started a new band called Victory Season. Victory Season: “Victory Season” CD January 2019 Self Released. USA Heavy / Thrash Metal band. Founding former member of Texas Hippie Coalition, having members son and father on bass Duane Connaughton and drums Tor Connaughton the pounding power needed to fire up this formation. Victory Season is going to blast the world with their kicking tunes. On the guitars Randy Cooper playing those fury lightning shreds to electrify the audience. Gary Jeffries singing backing vocals on "Be Kind", a track that would hit Number 1in Nashville on 2 radio stations. It also broke the top 10 in Europe.

== Influences ==
Cooper's influences include Mötley Crüe and Pantera as well as guitarists Eddie Van Halen, Randy Rhoads, Zakk Wylde and Darrell Abbott.

== Equipment ==
Cooper uses Dean Guitars and EMG-81/85 pickups. In 2012, the musician was quoted as using a Dean ML.

== Discography ==
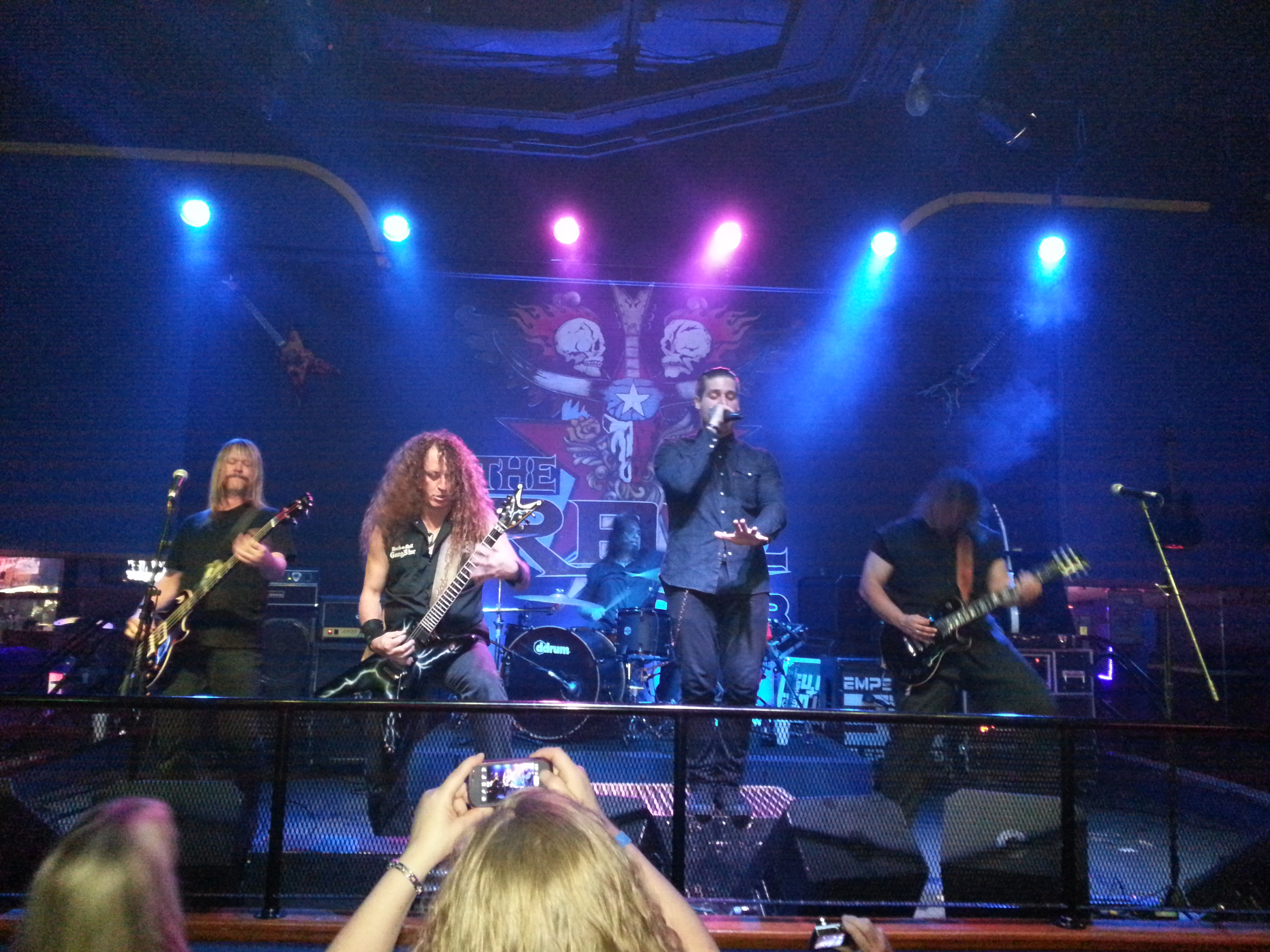
Cooper performing with American rock band Emperors and Elephants

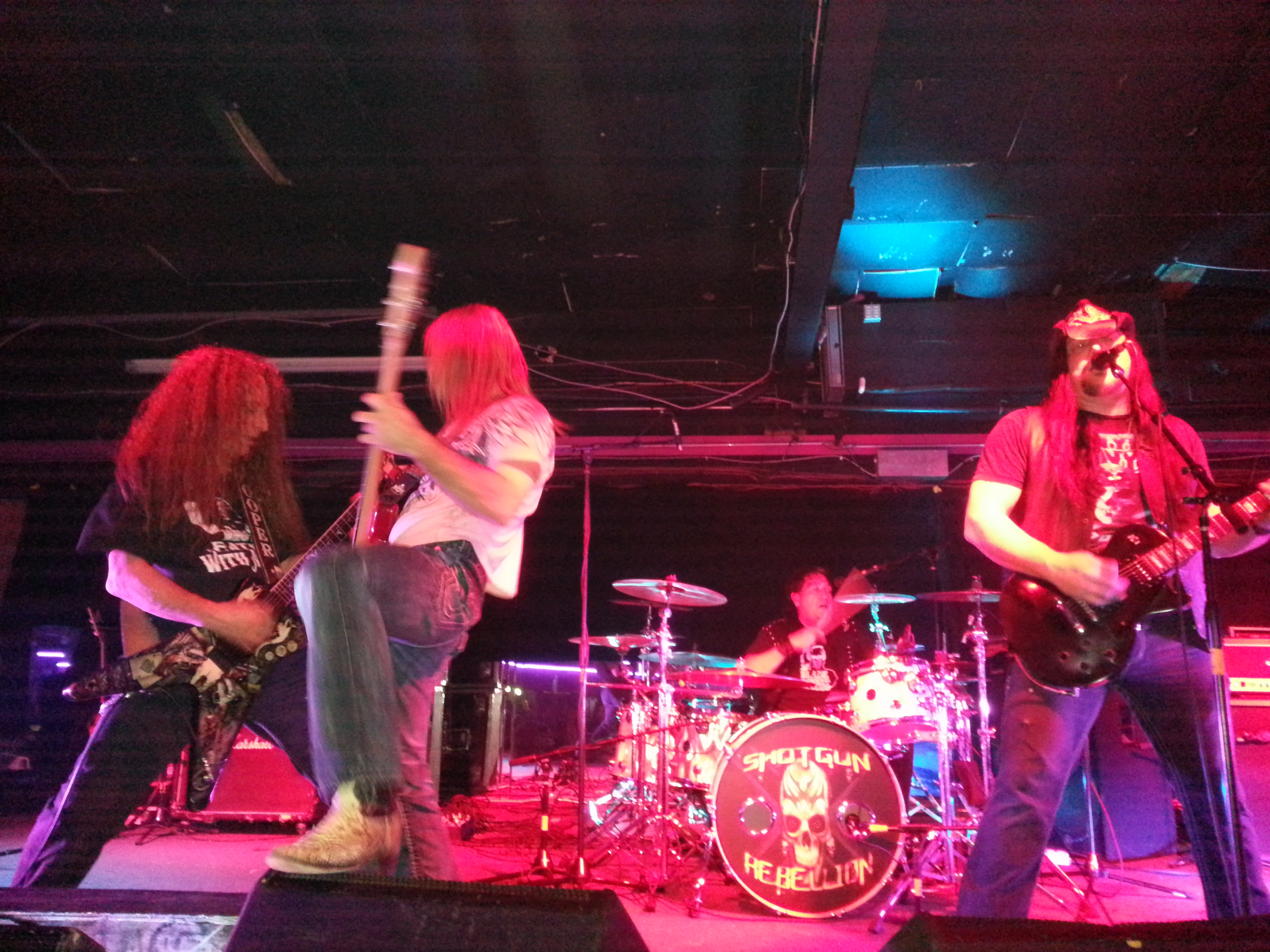
Cooper (left) performing with Jon Parr (center left), Johni Walker (center right) and Rick Davis (right) of American southern rock band Shotgun Rebellion

=== Texas Hippie Coalition ===
- Pride of Texas (2008)
- Rollin (2010)
- Peacemaker (2012)

=== Emperors and Elephants ===
- Devil in the Lake (2014)
- Devil in the Lake – Deluxe Edition (2015)
- Moth (2017)

=== Shotgun Rebellion ===
- Train of Pain (2013) (session musician)

=== Scattered Hamlet ===
- Skeleton Dixie (2013) (guest appearance)
