= Ride On (Texas Hippie Coalition album) =

Studio album by Texas Hippie Coalition
- Released: October 7, 2014
- Genre: Heavy metal; southern metal; groove metal; hard rock
- Length: 36:52
- Label: Carved
- Producer: Skidd Mills

Texas Hippie Coalition chronology
Peacemaker (2012)	Ride On (2014)	Dark Side of Black (2016)

Original cover art

Singles from Peacemaker
- 1. "Monster in Me" Released: August 19, 2014

Ride On is the fourth studio album by American heavy metal band Texas Hippie Coalition. Released on October 7, 2014 via Carved Records, the album was produced by Bob Marlette and Skidd Mills. The lyric video for the first single, "Monster in Me", was released on August 19, 2014.

== Track listing ==
All tracks are written by Richard Anderson and Skidd Mills, except where noted.

No.	Title	Length
1.	"El Diablo Rojo" (Richard Anderson, Cord Pool)	3:05
2.	"Splinter"	3:32
3.	"Monster in Me"	3:34
4.	"Go Pro" (Anderson, Bob Marlette)	4:46
5.	"Rock Ain't Dead"	2:59
6.	"Bottom of the Bottle" (Anderson, Marlette)	4:11
7.	"Rubbins Racin'"	3:25
8.	"Ride On" (Anderson, Marlette)	4:09
9.	"Fire in the Hole"	2:46
10.	"I Am the End" (Anderson, Marlette)	4:25
Total length:		36:52

== Personnel ==
- Big Dad Ritch – lead vocals
- John Exall – bass
- Cord Pool – guitar
- Timmy Braun – drums

== Charts ==
Chart (2012)	Peak position
US Billboard 200	119
US Heatseekers Albums	4
US Independent Albums	22
US Hard Rock Albums	5
US Top Rock Albums	31
