= Outlaw Rock =

Outlaw Rock (67°53′S 68°53′W) is an isolated rock, awash at low tide, lying west of the Dion Islands off the south end of Adelaide Island. First charted by the Royal Navy Hydrographic Survey Unit in 1963. So named by the United Kingdom Antarctic Place-Names Committee (UK-APC) because of its isolation.
