= Outlaw (surname) =

Outlaw is a surname. Notable people with the surname include:

- Alexander Outlaw (1738–1826), American frontiersman and politician
- Arthur R. Outlaw (1926–2000), twice mayor of Mobile, Alabama
- Bo Outlaw (born 1971), former National Basketball Association player
- Danielle Outlaw (born 1975), Police Commissioner of Philadelphia since 2020, former Chief of Police for Portland, Oregon
- David Outlaw (1806–1868), U.S. Congressman from North Carolina
- George Outlaw (1731–1825), U.S. Congressman from North Carolina; cousin of David Outlaw
- Jimmy Outlaw (1913–2006), Major League Baseball player
- John Outlaw (born 1945), former National Football League defensive back
- Nathan Outlaw (born 1978), English chef and restaurateur
- Sam Outlaw (born 1982), American country-western performer, using mother's maiden name
- Travis Outlaw (born 1984), National Basketball Association player
- Wyatt Outlaw (1820-1870), American politician
