= Outlaw (railroading jargon) =

The term outlaw, or outlawed refers to a crew (or train) which can no longer move because the crew has reached the maximum number of hours they are allowed to work, thereby outlawing their controlling the further movement of any train. All they may do is be relieved or deadhead to a "home terminal" (such as the place where they came on duty near their point of residence) or an "away from home terminal" (such as an approved hotel) to begin a period of rest.

== Hours of Service Act ==
In the United States railroad employees who are involved in the movement of trains are governed by the Hours of Service Act. The legislation is related to similar regulations which apply to other modes of transportation, but with significantly different specific limitations. The Act, which is administered by the Federal Railroad Administration, covers "train employees" (49 U.S.C. § 21103), "signal employees" (49 U.S.C. § 21104) and "dispatching service employees." (49 U.S.C. § 21105), as defined by the statute (49 U.S.C. § 21101).

This act is in place and in effect to ensure said employees receive "sufficient periods of rest" to ensure that they can perform their jobs safely. The law also specifies how many hours employees may work, both continuously and with a period of off time (called swing time) which is differentiated as being too short to be considered a period of rest. The affected employees include Dispatchers, Conductors, Engineers and more.
