= Texas Hippie Coalition =

American heavy metal band

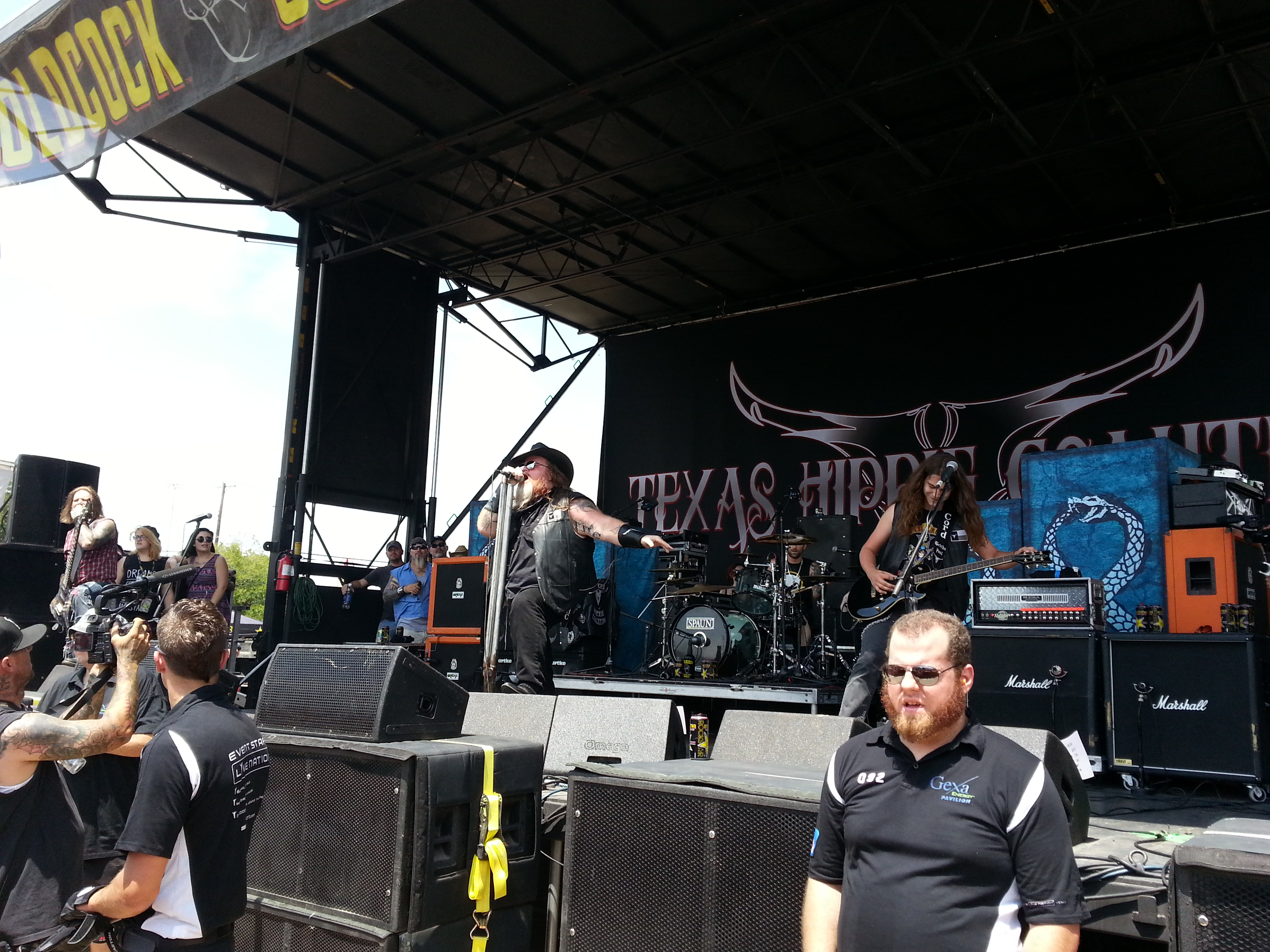
- Texas Hippie Coalition in 2014

Background information
- Also known as: THC, The Band of Outlaws
- Origin: Denison, Texas, U.S.
- Genres: Southern metal; groove metal; hard rock; heavy metal
- Years active: 2004–present
- Label: Entertainment One
- Members: Big Dad Ritch; Corban Raleigh Vincent; Nevada Romo; Larado Romo; Joey Mandigo
- Past members: Randy Cooper; Ryan Bennett; Alden Nequent; Michael Hayes; Scott Lytle; Cody Perryman; Wes Wallace; Gunnar Molton; Jason Elmore; John Exall; Timmy Braun; Devon Carothers; Cord Pool
- Website: thcofficial.com

Texas Hippie Coalition (often abbreviated to THC) is an American heavy metal band from Denison, Texas. They have released eight studio albums.

== History ==
The band was formed in Denison, Texas by Big Dad Ritch, along with his friend John Exall and other friends. Several lineup changes occurred before Rollin, with producer Dave Prater. Rollin arrived on July 6, 2010, which was their first national release.

In early 2012 the group began working with producer Bob Marlette. Their first single "Turn It Up" was released in June of that same year. Peacemaker was released on August 14, 2012, and was ranked 20 on Billboard Hard Rock Albums.

In February 2014, it was announced that Ride On, the fourth studio album from the quartet is expected to be released October 7, 2014. The record was produced by Skidd Mills, known for working with Saving Abel, Sick Puppies and others, at Sound Kitchen Studios. "Ride On" has been described by the band as, "the next level," "a little more raw, a little grittier," and "our way of letting everybody know that rock 'n' roll ain't dead."

During that same year, the ensemble also performed at Rocklahoma and Rock on the Range in May in addition to Mayhem Festival in the summer of 2014.

On February 23, 2016, the ensemble announced that their fifth studio album, Dark Side of Black, would be released on April 22, 2016. In April and May 2016, the band is scheduled to tour in support of this work, which includes performances at Rock on the Range, Rocklahoma and River City Rockfest.

In June 2016, the band announced the addition of guitarist Nevada Romo.

In August 2017, Ritch announced that the ensemble plans to release their sixth studio album in 2018. On January 12, 2018, Exall announced that he and the band had parted ways, leaving Ritch as the sole original band member. In early 2018, Larado Romo, brother of guitarist Nevada Romo, joined the ensemble on bass guitar.

During the first week of 2019, percussionist Timmy Braun and the band parted ways. Braun was replaced by Devon Carothers.

On March 29, 2019, "Moonshine", the first single from High in the Saddle, the sixth studio album from the group, was released. At that time, the ensemble announced that the work would be released on May 31, 2019, the first from the band released through Entertainment One.

In 2020, Scott Lytle, former percussionist for the band from 2007 to 2008, died.

On January 10, 2021, the band mutually parted ways with drummer Devon Carothers. On January 12, Locust Grove and DEITY drummer Joey Mandigo was announced as the band's new drummer.

On March 3, 2023, the band released the single "Hell Hounds" from their seventh studio album The Name Lives On which was released on April 21, 2023.

On August 13, 2024, the band released a single entitled "Gunsmoke", which is the title track from their album released on October 4, 2024.

On September 22, 2025, the band released a single "Just Like Johnny Cash".

== Personnel ==
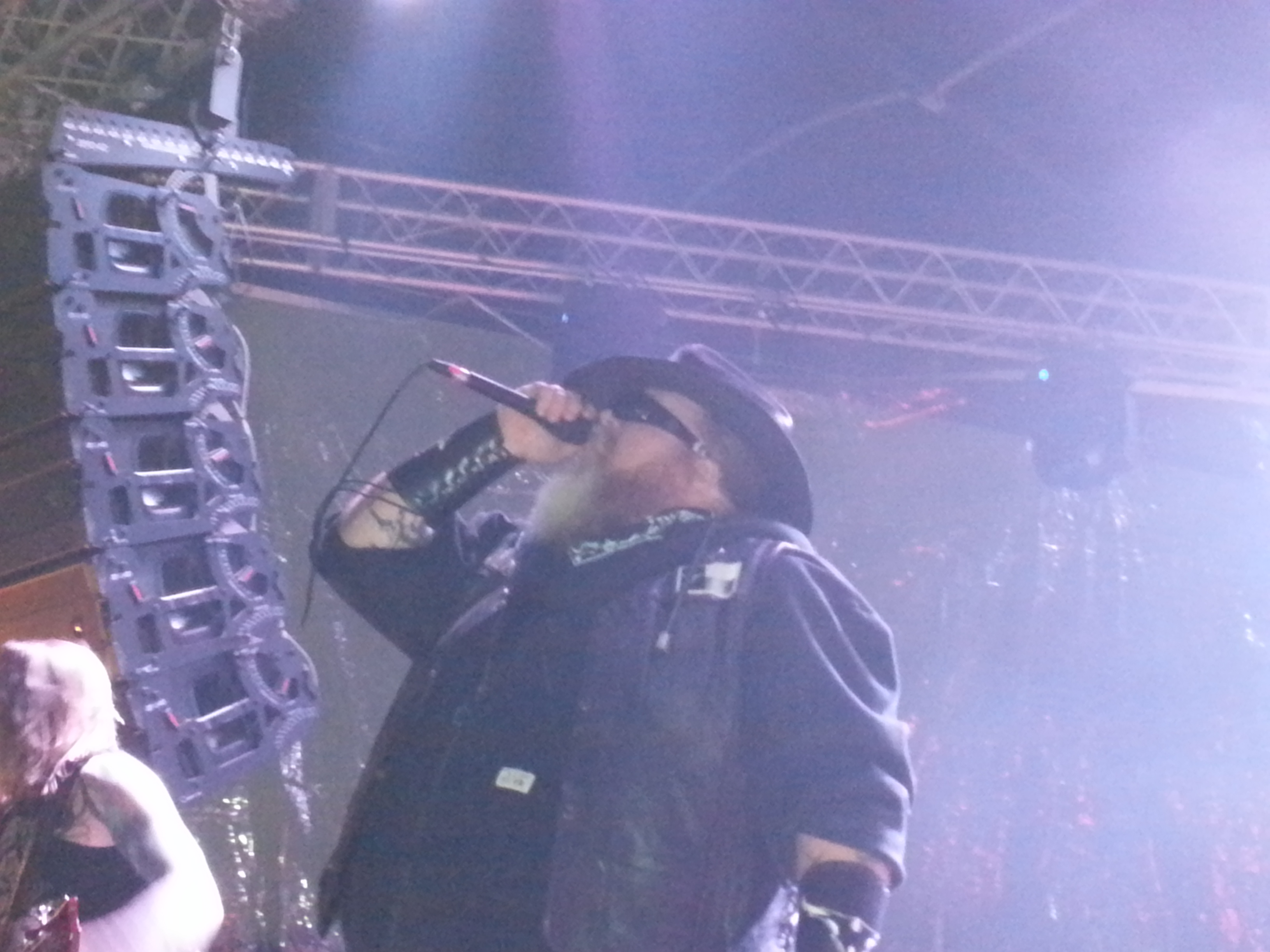
Big Dad Ritch

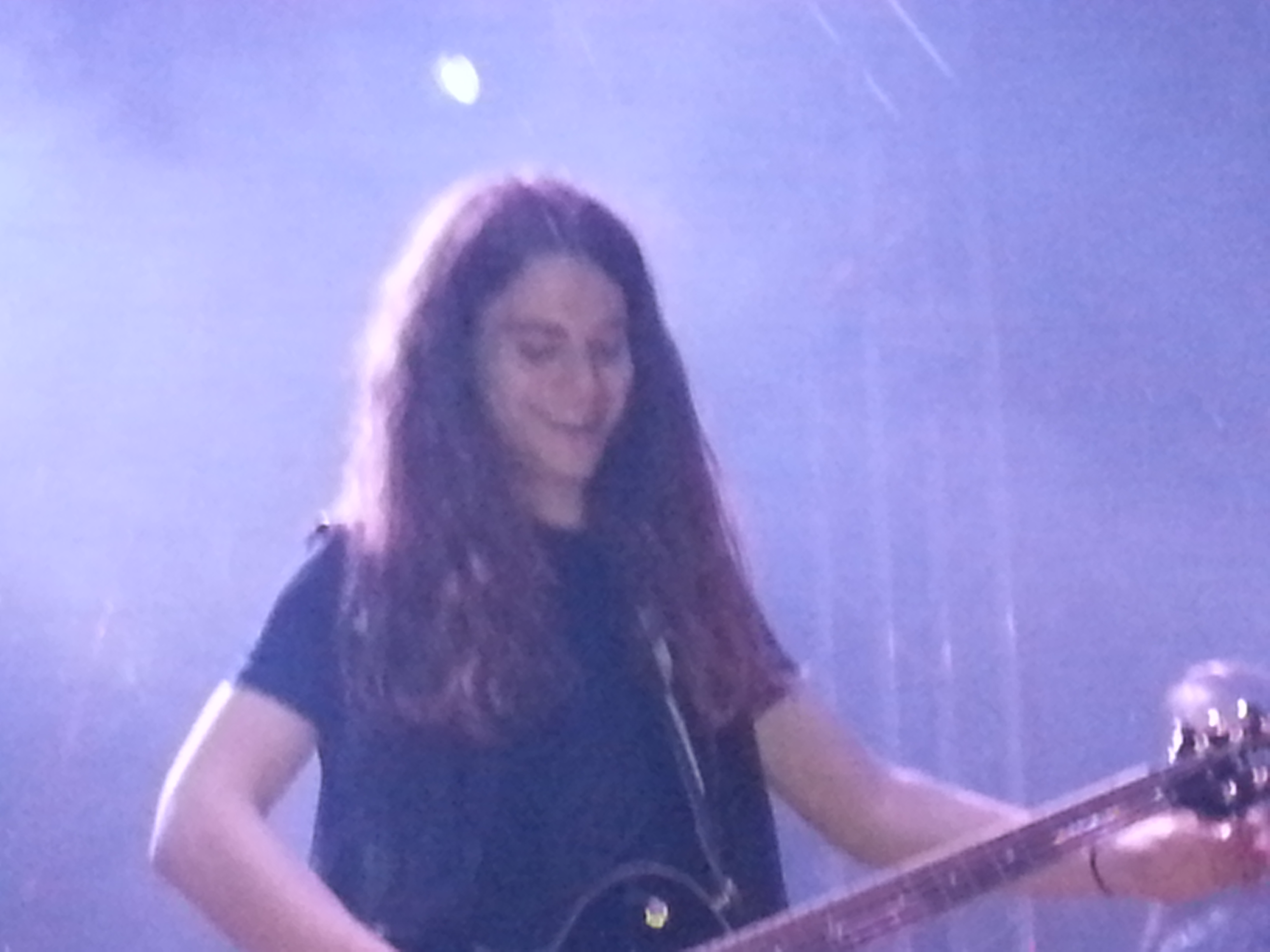
Cord Pool

=== Current members ===
- Big Dad Ritch (James Richard Earl Anderson) – lead vocals (2004-present)
- Corban Vincent – lead guitar (2025-present)
- Nevada Romo – rhythm guitar, backing vocals (2016-present)
- Larado Romo – bass, backing vocals (2018-present)
- Joey Mandigo – drums (2021-present)

=== Former members ===
- Cord Pool - lead guitar (2013-2025)
- Randy Cooper – lead guitar (2007–2012)
- Ryan "The Kid" Bennett – drums (2009–2011)
- Alden "Crawfish" Nequent – rhythm guitar (2009–2011)
- Michael Hayes – rhythm guitar (2004–2008)
- Scott "Cowboy" Lytle – drums (2007–2008; died 2020)
- Dillon Escue – drums (2008)
- Cody Perryman – lead guitar (2004–2007)
- Wes Wallace – guitar (2012–2014)
- Carl Lowe – drums
- Gunnar Molton – drums
- Lance Bruton – drums
- Jason Elmore – lead guitar (2007)
- John Exall – bass (2004–2018)
- Timmy Braun – drums (2011–2019)
- Devon Carothers – drums (2019–2021)

== Discography ==
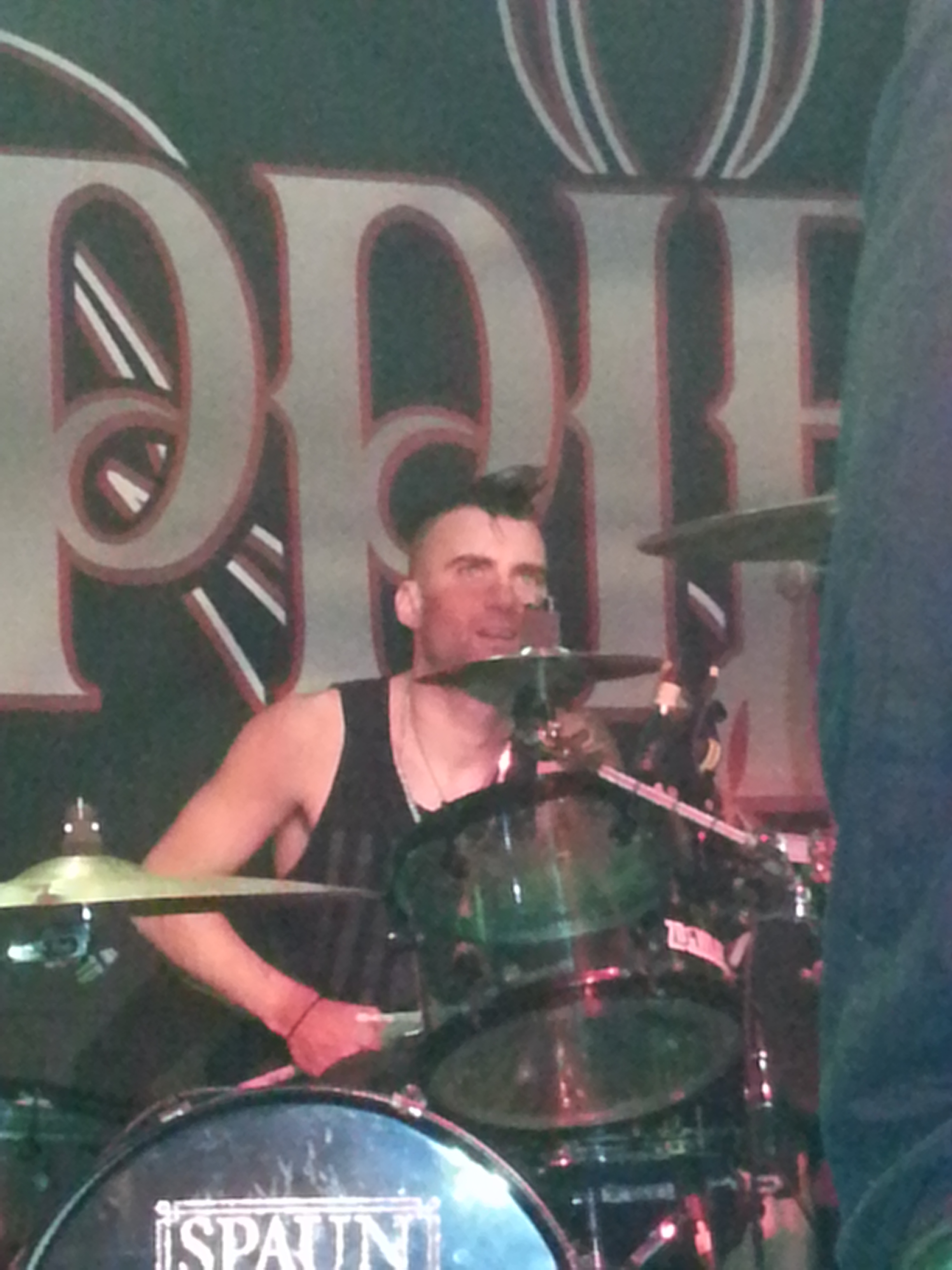
Timmy Braun

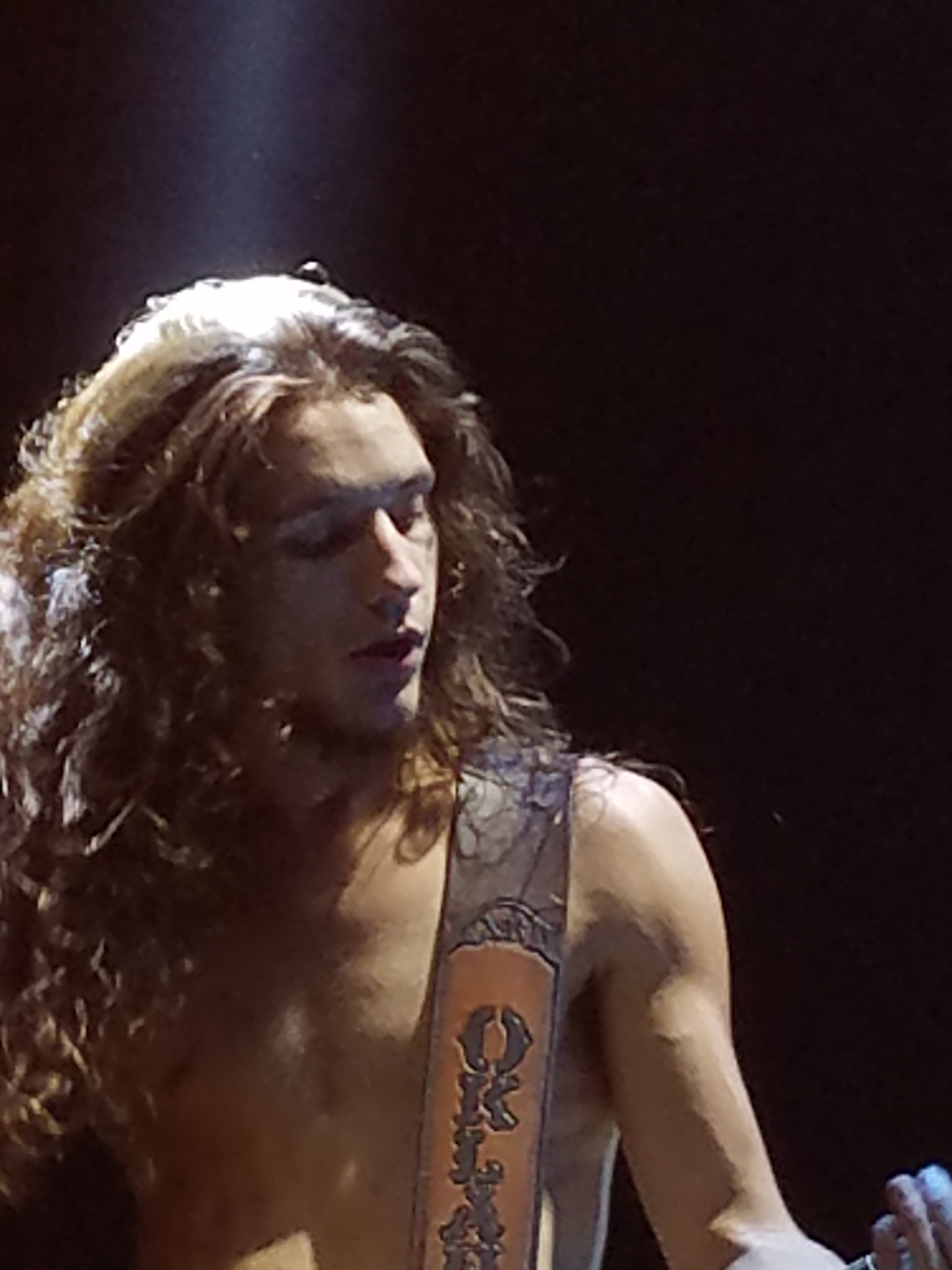
Nevada Romo

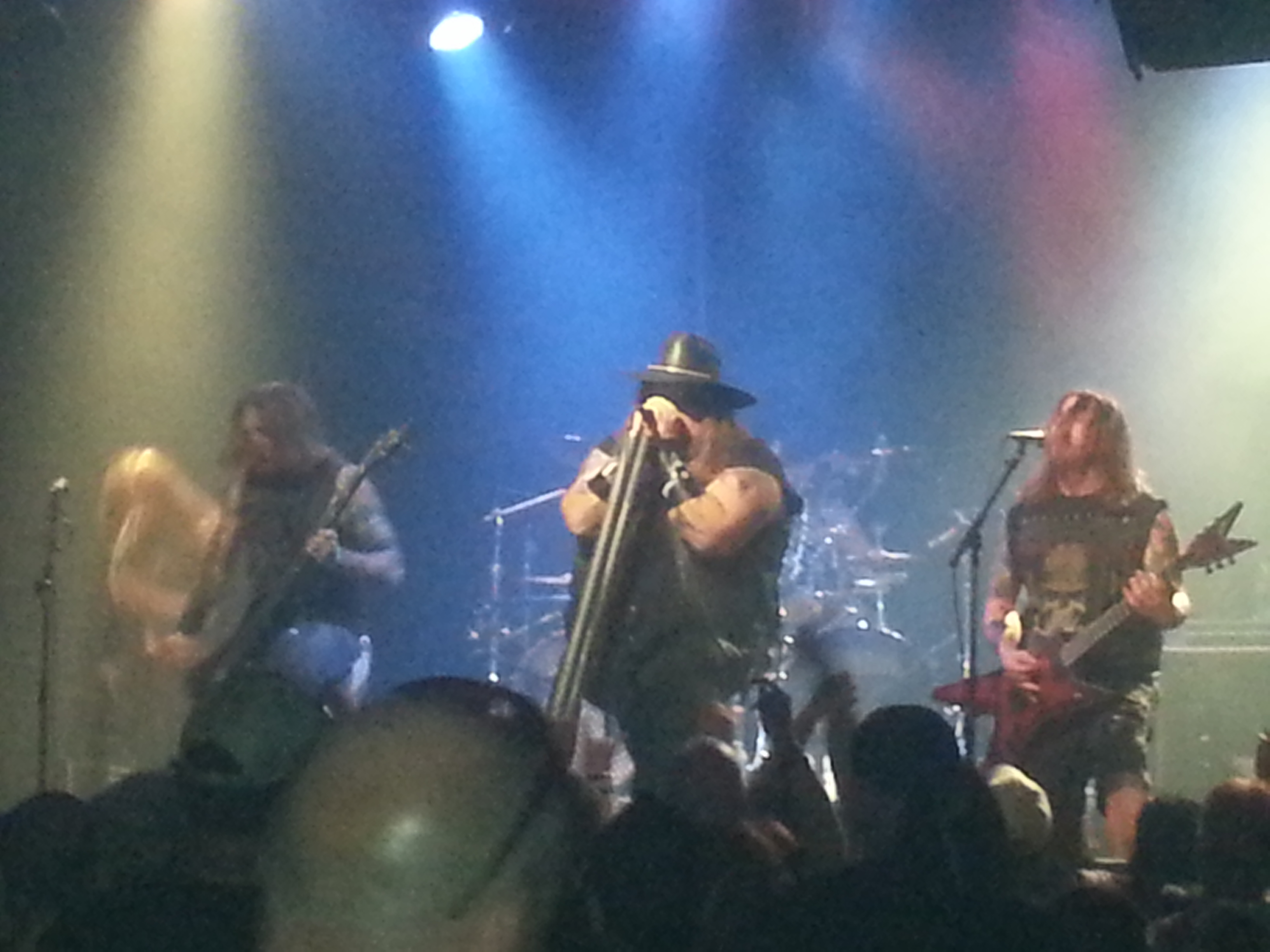
Texas Hippie Coalition performing at Trees in Dallas as part of Ride for Dime

=== Studio albums ===
Details	Peak chart positions					Sales
Details	US	US Heat	US Indep	US Hard Rock	US Rock	Sales
Pride of Texas: Release date: February 12, 2008; Label: Self-released	—	—	—	—	—	
Rollin': Release date: July 6, 2010; Label: Carved	—	29	—	—	—	
Peacemaker: Release date: August 14, 2012; Label: Carved	—	4	31	20	—	US: 16,000
Ride On: Release date: October 7, 2014; Label: Carved	119	4	22	5	31	
Dark Side of Black: Release date: April 22, 2016; Label: Carved	—	2	18	6	26	
High in the Saddle: Release date: May 31, 2019; Label: Entertainment One	—	—	—	—	—	
The Name Lives On: Release date: April 21, 2023; Label: MNRK Music Group	—	—	—	—	—	
Gunsmoke: Release date: October 4, 2024; Label: MNRK Music Group	—	—	—	—	—	
Stoned Cowboys: Release date: August 13, 2026; Label: Self released	—	—	—	—	—	
Band of Outlaws: Release date: August 13, 2026; Label: Self Released	—	—	—	—	—	

=== Singles ===
Year	Title	US Main. Rock
2013	"Turn It Up"	39
2013	"Damn You to Hell"	40
2014	"Monster in Me"	—
2015	"Rock Ain't Dead"	—
2016	"Rise"	—
2016	"Angel Fall"	—
2016	"Come Get It"	—
2019	"Moonshine"	—
2019	"Dirty Finger"	—
2023	"Hell Hounds"	—
2023	"Hard Habit"	—
2024	"Gunsmoke"	—
2025	"Just Like Johnny Cash"	—

=== Music videos ===
Year	Title	Album	Director
2008	"Pissed Off and Mad About It" (Version 1)	Pride of Texas	Clark Deal
2008	"Leaving"	Pride of Texas	Clark Deal
2009	"No Shame"	Pride of Texas	Clark Deal
2010	"Pissed Off and Mad About It" (Version 2)	Rollin'	Clark Deal
2012	"Turn It Up"	Peacemaker	Clark Deal
2016	"Angel Fall"	Dark Side of Black	Clark Deal
2019	"Moonshine"	High in the Saddle	Justin H. Reich
2019	"Dirty Finger"	High in the Saddle	Justin H. Reich
