= Screamer Magazine =

American rock music magazine

Screamer Magazine, which billed itself "The Loudest Mag on The Planet", was an American rock music magazine. It was created by David F. Castagno in October 1987.

The publication started out as a vehicle in which to promote local rock bands in the Los Angeles area. By early 1988 Screamer conducted interviews with Guns N' Roses, Metallica, Ozzy Osbourne and others.

In 1992 Castagno sold a controlling interest in the magazine to McMullen & Yee Publishing, which was eventually acquired by Primedia (now Rent Group). In 1994, Castagno parted ways with his new publishing company, but was given the magazine to continue publishing on his own. However, the musical landscape had changed so much he decided to close it in May 1994.

In the spring of 2011 Castagno decided to digitize his archive of vintage magazines and re-launch an online version of Screamer Magazine.
