= Carved Records =

American record label

Carved Records is an American record label in Dallas which began in 2009.

== History ==
Carved Records was founded by CEO Tim Porter (after a career in many non-music business ventures) and Phil Thomas, vice president of operation. Thomas is a music industry veteran with over 20 years in the music industry. Since its formation, the label has released six albums and a compilation album.

In 2012, Carved secured a distribution deal with EMI and deals with The Orchard and Cargo Records for worldwide distribution.

== Artists ==
As of February 2013, Carved Records has two significant bands on the label.

Texas Hippie Coalition

The band Texas Hippie Coalition (THC) was brought to the label’s attention early because of their self-generated success. THC had been on the road consistently playing with bands they had grown up idolizing. They had found supportive fans in the form of music lovers, gear companies, and corporate sponsors. THC met with Carved in late 2009. Shortly thereafter, Texas Hippie Coalition was the first band signed to Carved Records. They released their first national album, Rollin' on July 6, 2010 via Carved. On August 14, 2013, THC released their third studio album, "Peacemaker".

Tyler Bryant

In February 2012, Carved Records signed Tyler Bryant & the Shakedown. Tim Porter said, “Once we witnessed a live performance, adding Tyler to the Carved family was a priority. Not only is Tyler extremely talented, he has surrounded himself with equally as talented band mates. These guys are the real deal and everyone at Carved is very excited to be working with them.” On January 22, 2013, Tyler Bryant & the Shakedown released their first full-length album, "Wild Child".

== The Boot Campaign ==
Carved Records has partnered with "The Boot Campaign", a non-profit organization dedicated to easing the transitions of returning military from overseas. Their slogan, "get YOUR boots on" calls for civilians to put themselves in the position of the troops. Carved released a compilation album benefiting The Boot Campaign entitled When They Come Back... We Give Back featuring Texas country artists giving time and music to support The Boot Campaign. Artists featured on the compilation include Carved Records' own No Justice, Robert Earl Keen, Derek Sholl, Wade Bowen, Stoney LaRue, Micky and the Motorcars, Jason Boland and the Stragglers, Eli Young Band, Randy Rogers Band, Kevin Fowler, Aaron Watson, Reckless Kelly, Cross Canadian Ragweed, Bleu Edmondson, and Jack Ingram. The album was released September 14, 2010.

== Carved Records releases ==
- Texas Hippie Coalition: Rollin' – July 6, 2010
- No Justice: 2nd Avenue – July 6, 2010
- Juke Kartel: Levolution – September 28, 2010
- The Boot Campaign Compilation: When They Come Back...We Give Back – September 14, 2010
- HURT: "The Crux" – May 1, 2012
- Texas Hippie Coalition: "Peacemaker" – August 14, 2012
- Tyler Bryant & the Shakedown: "Wild Child" – January 22, 2013
