= Earthling =

Earthling or Earthlings may refer to:

== Film and television ==
- Earthling (film), a 2010 sci-fi film
- Earthlings (film), a 2005 animal rights documentary
- The Earthling, a 1980 drama film
- "Earthling" (Fringe), a 2009 TV episode
- "Earthlings" (Steven Universe), a 2016 TV episode
- Earthlings, original code-name for The L Word TV series

== Music ==
- Earthling (band), an English trip hop band
- Earthlings?, an American psychedelic rock band
- The Earthlings, a British acoustic duo
- Earthling (David Bowie album), 1997
- Earthling (Eddie Vedder album), 2022
- Earthlings (album), by Chrome Hill, 2008

== Other uses ==
- Earthling Publications, an American small press
- Earthlings, a 2018 novel by Sayaka Murata

== See also ==
- Earth (disambiguation)
- Planet Earth (disambiguation)
- Terran (disambiguation)
- Earth in science fiction
