= Earth (disambiguation) =

Earth is the third planet from the Sun and the only habitable planet.

Earth may also refer to:

== Elements ==
- Earth (classical element), one of the four Greek classical elements
- Earth (wuxing), one of the Wu Xing elements in Chinese philosophy

== Science ==
- Earth (historical chemistry), a class of elements or compounds
- Earth (electricity) or ground, used as a zero potential reference
- Land or earth, the solid terrestrial surface of the planet
- Soil or earth, the material in which plants grow

== Places ==
- Earth, Texas, a small town in the United States
- Earth City, Missouri, an unincorporated community in the United States

== People with the name ==
- Chief Earth Woman, Ojibwa chief
- Trembling Earth, Yankton Sioux chief

== Animals ==
- Earth, a lair of burrowing animals such as foxes
- Earth, a captive orca at Kamogawa SeaWorld

== Arts, entertainment, and media ==
=== Films ===
- Earth (1930 film), a Soviet film by Alexander Dovzhenko
- Earth (1947 film), an Austrian-Swiss film
- Earth (1957 film), a Bulgarian film
- Earth (1996 film), a Spanish film by Julio Medem
- Earth (1998 film), an Indo-Canadian film by Deepa Mehta
- Earth (2007 film), a documentary produced by the BBC Natural History Unit
- The Earth (1921 film), a French film by André Antoine, based on the novel by Émile Zola
- The Earth (1974 film), or The Land, a South Korean film
- The Earth (2006 film), or Our Land, an Italian film

=== Literature ===
- Earth (Brin novel), a 1990 science fiction novel by David Brin
- Earth (The Book), a 2010 non-fiction book by Jon Stewart, et al.
- La Terre or The Earth, an 1887 novel by Émile Zola
- Earth, a planet in Isaac Asimov's Foundation (book series)
- The Earth, a non-fiction book by Isaac Asimov
- Earth, a 2009 book by Bob Brown

=== Music ===
==== Groups ====
- Earth (American band), a rock band formed in 1989
- Earth (British band), a 1968–1969 band formed by Glenn Ross Campbell of the Misunderstood
- Earth (Japanese band), a 2000–2005 J-pop group
- Earth, the original band of Bruce Springsteen
- Black Sabbath, a metal band once named Earth

==== Albums ====
- Earth (Jefferson Starship album) (1978)
- Earth (Matthew Sweet album) (1989)
- Earth (Vangelis album) (1973)
- Earth (Neil Young and Promise of the Real album) (2016)
- Earth (EOB album) (2020)
- Earth (Sault album) (2022)

==== Songs ====
- Earth anthem, various songs that exalt the planet, its environment, or its inhabitants
- "Earth" (song), a 2019 song by Lil Dicky
- "EARTH", a song by Susumu Hirasawa from the 1997 Sword-Wind Chronicle BERSERK Original Soundtrack
- "Earth", a song by Smile
- "Earth", a song by Way Out West from the 1997 album Way Out West
- "Earth Song", a 1995 song by Michael Jackson

=== Television ===
- Earth: Final Conflict, a science fiction television series
- Earth (2023 TV series), a nature TV miniseries presented by Chris Packham
- Earth 2 (TV series), a science fiction TV series
- Avatar: The Last Airbender (season 2) or Earth
- BBC Earth, a brand of natural history television programming distributed by BBC Studios
  - BBC Earth (TV channel), its documentary pay TV channel

=== Other uses in arts, entertainment, and media ===
- Earth.fm, digital platform, and audio repository
- Earth, a character in Konjiki no Gash Bell!
- Earth in science fiction
- Earth (board game), a 2023 board game

== Other uses ==
- Earth Day, annual international event every April 22
- Earth Group, a former Croatian fine arts collective
- Earth Hour, annual symbolic environmental event
- Google Earth, interactive view of the earth, made by Google
- Minecraft Earth, sandbox video game
- Miss Earth, a beauty contest
- Mother Earth (disambiguation)
- Eartha, the world's largest rotating globe

== See also ==
- Gaia (disambiguation)
- Ground (disambiguation)
- Planet Earth (disambiguation)
- Terra (disambiguation)
- Whole Earth (disambiguation)
- World (disambiguation)
