= Mother Earth =

Mother Earth may refer to:

- The Earth goddess in any of the world's mythologies
- Mother goddess
- Mother Nature, a common personification of the Earth and its biosphere as the giver and sustainer of life

== Written media and literature ==
- "Mother Earth" (novella), a science fiction story by Isaac Asimov
- Mother Earth (magazine), a magazine founded by anarchist Emma Goldman
- Mother Earth (journal), a journal published by anarchists John G. Scott and Jo Ann Wheeler
- Mother Earth News, a bi-monthly American magazine
- Mother Earth Publishing Association, a publisher closely affiliated with Emma Goldman

== Film and television ==
- Mother Earth (film), also known as Terra madre, a 1931 Italian film
- The Mother Earth, the 2009 Malayalam film Boomi Malayalam
- "Mother Earth" (The Green Green Grass), an episode of the BBC sitcom The Green Green Grass

== Music ==
=== Performers ===
- Mother Earth (American band), a 1967–1977 blues rock band
- Mother Earth (British band), a 1990s acid jazz group
- I Mother Earth, a Canadian alternative rock band

=== Albums and videos ===
- Mother Earth (Maki Ohguro album) or the title song, 1998
- Mother Earth (Within Temptation album) or the title song (see below), 2000
- Mother Earth Tour, a DVD by Within Temptation, 2003
- Tracy Nelson/Mother Earth or Mother Earth, by the American group Mother Earth, 1972

=== Songs ===
- "Mother Earth" (Memphis Slim song), 1951
- "Mother Earth" (Within Temptation song), 2002
- "Mother Earth", by Banks from The Altar, 2016
- "Mother Earth", by the Cimarons, 1978
- "Mother-Earth", by Crass from Stations of the Crass, 1979
- "Mother Earth", by Dawn of Solace from Affliction Vortex, 2025
- "Mother Earth", by Freedom Call from The Circle of Life, 2005
- "Mother Earth", by Ian Thomas, 1975
- "Mother Earth", by Jan Berry, 1972
- "Mother Earth", by Sweet from Cut Above the Rest, 1979
- "Mother Earth", by Threshold from Wounded Land, 1993
- "Mother Earth", by Tom Rush from Merrimack County, 1972
- "Mother Earth", by Underworld from Dubnobasswithmyheadman, 1994
- "Mother Earth", by Emitt Rhodes from The American Dream, 1970
- "Mother Earth (Natural Anthem)", by Neil Young from Ragged Glory, 1990
- "Mother Earth – a Fanfare", a composition by David Maslanka, 2003

== Other ==
- Mother Earth (horse) (foaled 2018), an Irish Thoroughbred racehorse
- Mother Earth (sculpture), a 1921 sculpture designed by Ernst Barlach and sculptured by Friedrich Bursch
- Mother Earth Brewing, a brewery in Kinston, North Carolina, US
- Mother Earth Brewing Company, a brewery in Vista, California, US

== See also ==
- Atabey (goddess)
- Earth (disambiguation)
- Environmentalism
- Gaia hypothesis
- Gaia philosophy
- Ötüken
