= Tellurian =

Tellurian may refer to:

- anything pertaining to Earth, see Earth
- Tellurian (album), second album by Soen
- Tellurian Inc, an American natural gas company
- Tellurion, an astronomical device

== See also ==
- Telluria
- Tellurium
- Tellus (disambiguation)
- Earthling (disambiguation)
- Terran (disambiguation)
