= Terran =

Terran or Terrans may also refer to:

== Fictional entities ==
In science fiction, Terran can be used to refer to humans, in reference to Terra, the Latin name for planet Earth. Examples include:

=== Literature ===
- Terran Federation from Starship Troopers
- Terran Trade Authority universe of Stewart Cowley
- Terran Empire in the books of Poul Anderson
- Terrans meaning Earthlings in the Hainish universe of Ursula K. Le Guin

=== Television ===
- Terran Federation (Blake's 7)
- Terran Empire in the Mirror Universe of Star Trek
- Terran Spacers in the Toward Stars Universe of Outlaw Star
- Terrans meaning Earthlings in Agents of S.H.I.E.L.D.

=== Gaming ===
- Terran Empire, in Star Hero
- Terran, in StarCraft
- Terran Federation (Starfire)
- Terran Republic, in PlanetSide
- Terrans, in Star Command: Revolution
- Terran Confederation (Wing Commander)
- Terrans, in the X video game series
- Terrans, referencing human species by the martian hero Juno in Overwatch 2

== People ==
- Jennifer Terran (fl. from 1997), American singer-songwriter and pianist
- Tony Terran (1926–2017), American trumpet player and musician
- Terran Campbell (born 1998), Canadian soccer player
- Terran Petteway (born 1992), American basketball player in the Israeli Basketball Premier League
- Terran Sandwith (born 1972), Canadian ice hockey player

== Other ==
- Terran (grape), alternative name for Mondeuse Noire
- Terran, the name of space launch vehicles by Relativity Space

== See also ==
- Terran Federation (disambiguation)
- Terra (disambiguation)
- Terrain (disambiguation)
- Terrestrial (disambiguation)
- Earth#Etymology
- Earth in science fiction#Related vocabulary
- Earthling (disambiguation)
