= The Darkness (Dawn of Solace album) =

Studio album by Dawn of Solace
- Released: 26 May 2006
- Genre: Doom metal, gothic metal, melodic death metal
- Length: 39:37
- Label: Dead Air, Noble Demon

Dawn of Solace chronology
The Darkness (2006)	Waves (2020)

Professional ratings
Review scores
Source	Rating
Imperiumi	8/10
Metal Storm	7.7/10
Metalfan.nl	80/100

The Darkness is the debut album by Dawn of Solace, released on 26 May 2006 on the Dead Air label.

The album and project spawned from the writing sessions for the third Before the Dawn album, The Ghost, in which many songs were written but some of the material was slower, more melodic and darker than the songs chosen for The Ghost and frontman Tuomas Saukkonen wanted to take things further without any limitations that Before the Dawn might create.

After the album's release, problems with the Dead Air label caused Dawn of Solace to be put on hold until 2019, when they were signed to their current label Noble Demon and had The Darkness re-released via that label in November 2019.

== Track listing ==
1. Dying Daylight – 2:50
2. Wings Of Darkness Attached On The Children Of The Light – 7:23
3. I Was Never There – 6:51
4. Dead Air – 5:19
5. I Am Chaos, I Am Destruction – 6:01
6. Winter Song – 2:37
7. Wrath Of Gods Amongst Us – 4:55
8. Avalanche – 3:39
