= Draconian Darkness =

2024 studio album by Finnish band Wolfheart

Studio album by Wolfheart
- Released: 6 September 2024
- Genre: Melodic death metal
- Length: 39:23
- Label: Reigning Phoenix Music
- Producer: Saku Moilanen

Wolfheart chronology
| King of the North (2022) | Draconian Darkness (2024) |

Singles from Draconian Darkness
- 1. "Grave" Released: 8 June 2024; 2. "Evenfall" Released: 12 July 2024; 3. "Trial by Fire" Released: 7 August 2024; 4. "Ancient Cold" Released: 6 September 2024; 5. "The Gale" Released: 21 October 2024; 6. "Burning Sky" Released: 15 January 2025

Draconian Darkness is the seventh studio album by Finnish melodic death metal band Wolfheart, released on 6 September 2024, through Reigning Phoenix Music.

Band founder Tuomas Saukkonen stated that the album marked a "return to a darker and more aggressive direction" previously explored in Wolves of Karelia, as opposed to their "melodic and mid-tempo album" King of the North. He also explained that the lyrical theme of Draconian Darkness contradicted the nature-friendly theme of King of the North, stating "We worshipped bears as demigods which was represented in the cover artwork. We prayed for rain, prayed for sun, and feared the thunder. We were in a very good balance and only killed what we needed and ate what we were able to grow. Draconian Darkness represents how humankind no longer share those values and don’t carry the same balance. We kill what we want, burn what we want and just take it. It’s about the darkness we are contributing to this world."

The album debuted at number 15 on the Finnish official album chart and number 3 on the physical album chart. The band will embark on a European tour in September and October 2025.

== Track listing ==
| No. | Title | Length |
|---|---|---|
| 1. | "Ancient Cold" | 5:33 |
| 2. | "Evenfall" | 4:03 |
| 3. | "Burning Sky" | 4:15 |
| 4. | "Death Leads the Way" | 3:18 |
| 5. | "Scion of the Flame" | 4:01 |
| 6. | "Grave" | 4:22 |
| 7. | "Throne of Bones" | 5:28 |
| 8. | "Trial by Fire" | 3:51 |
| 9. | "The Gale" | 4:32 |
| Total length: | | 39:23 |

== Personnel ==
- Tuomas Saukkonen – vocals, guitar
- Vagelis Karzis – guitar, clean vocals
- Lauri Silvonen – bass, backing vocals
- Joonas Kauppinen – drums

=== Guests ===
- Saku Moilanen – keyboards, orchestrations

=== Production ===
- Saku Moilanen – producer, mixing, mastering
- VisionBlack – cover art, layout
