= Black Sun Aeon =

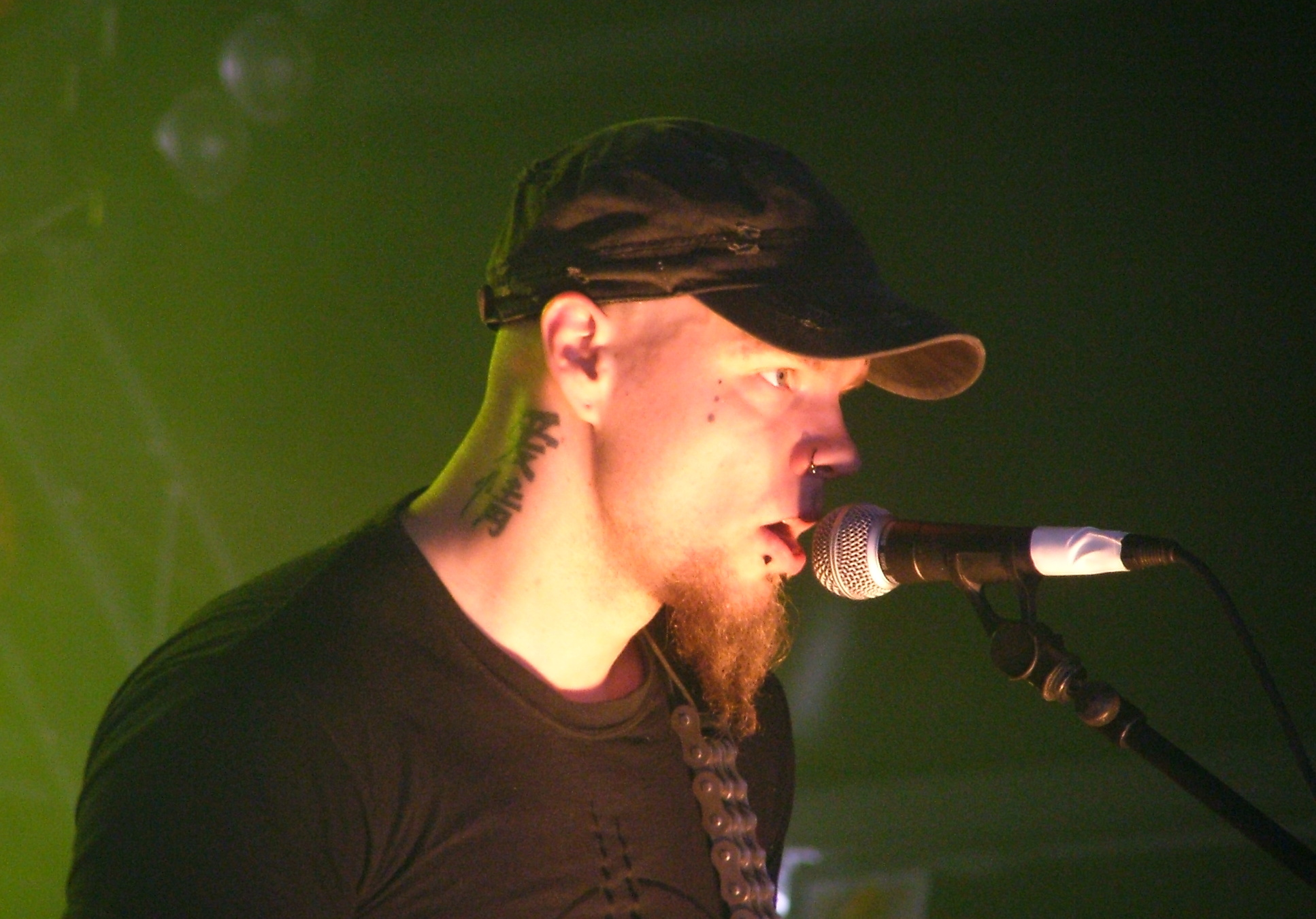
- Tuomas Saukkonen

Background information
- Origin: Lahti, Päijät-Häme, Finland
- Genres: Death-doom, doom metal, melodic death metal, death metal
- Years active: 2008-2013
- Labels: Cyclone Empire, Stay Heavy
- Members: Tuomas Saukkonen

Black Sun Aeon was a Finnish death-doom project, formed in 2008 by Tuomas Saukkonen (Before the Dawn, Dawn of Solace, Wolfheart). The project released three studio albums before ending in 2013.

== History ==
Formed in 2008, Black Sun Aeon released its first album, Darkness Walks Beside Me on 27 March 2009, reaching number 39 in the Finnish Charts. The album received positive feedback, and it features clean vocalist Mikko Heikkilä and harsh vocalist Mynni Luukkainen, as well as guest vocalists Tomi Koivusaari (Amorphis) and Ville Sorvali (Moonsorrow).

The band's second album Routa was released on 1 April 2010, available for free streaming throughout its first week of release. It is an 80-minute double album, with the first disc Talviaamu focused on "clean vocals and melancholic melodies", and the second disc Talviyö being "harder, rougher, and darker". The album received many positive reviews. On 11 April 2010, the band released a music video for "Frozen", along with a music video for "A Song For My Funeral" from Darkness Walks Beside Me.

The band released their third album Blacklight Deliverance on 3 October 2011. While once again gaining more positive feedback, it has also received a more mixed review, claiming that each track is "the same song only with a different title... over... and over..." On 19 October 2011, a music video for "Solitude" was released.

On 10 January 2013 through a press statement, Tuomas Saukkonen announced that he was putting Black Sun Aeon to rest along with his other active bands (Before the Dawn and RoutaSielu), ending them in order to create a new project called Wolfheart, which he will entirely focus from now on, although he would reform Before the Dawn in 2021.

== Musical style ==
Black Sun Aeon and its material have been described as death-doom, doom metal, melodic death metal, and death metal.

== Members ==
Main founder

- Tuomas Saukkonen – all instruments, harsh vocals (2008–2013)

Session

- Mikko Heikkilä - live rhythm guitar, clean vocals (2008–2013)
- Mynni Luukkainen - live lead guitar, additional harsh vocals (2008–2011)
- Janica Lönn - clean vocals (2010–2013)
- Pyry Hanski - live lead guitar (2011–2013)

== Discography ==
=== Studio albums ===
- Darkness Walks Beside Me (27 March 2009)

No.	Title	Length
1.	"A Song for the Introduction"	1:24
2.	"A Song for My Wrath"	4:56
3.	"A Song for My Demise"	6:05
4.	"A Song for My Sorrow"	6:03
5.	"A Song for My Weakness"	4:42
6.	"A Song for This Winter"	5:39
7.	"A Song for My Illness"	4:46
8.	"A Song for My Funeral"	6:17
9.	"A Song for the One That Passed Away 4.9.2008 (bonus track)"	4:13
Total length:		44:05

- Routa (1 April 2010)

Disc 1 - Talviaamu
No.	Title	Length
1.	"Core of Winter"	5:24
2.	"Frozen"	5:46
3.	"Sorrowsong"	6:30
4.	"Routa"	5:15
5.	"Wreath of Ice"	4:30
6.	"Dead Sun Aeon"	6:00
7.	"Cold"	5:40
Total length:		39:05

Disc 2 - Talviyö
No.	Title	Length
1.	"Funeral of World"	7:20
2.	"River"	4:26
3.	"Frozen Kingdom"	5:06
4.	"Wanderer"	4:56
5.	"The Beast"	5:51
6.	"Silence"	4:35
7.	"Apocalyptic Reveries" (includes silence from 3:50 to 4:07 and hidden track)	7:25
Total length:		39:39

- Blacklight Deliverance (3 October 2011)

No.	Title	Length
1.	"Brothers"	6:38
2.	"Solitude"	5:25
3.	"Sheol"	5:38
4.	"Oblivion"	4:50
5.	"Horizon"	5:21
6.	"Wasteland"	6:20
7.	"Nightfall" (includes hidden track at 5:50)	7:13
Total length:		41:25

=== Split albums ===
- Dirty Black Summer (split EP) (2008)

No.	Title	Artist	Length
1.	"Silence"	Before the Dawn	3:03
2.	"With Pain and Sorrow"	Silentrain	3:07
3.	"Eleanor Rigby (The Beatles cover)"	Godsplague	3:17
4.	"Bloodgod"	The Final Harvest	2:55
5.	"3rd Chapter"	Black Sun Aeon	5:55
Total length:			18:16

- My Darkness (1999-2013) (split compilation) (2015)

Disc 1
No.	Title	Artist	Length
1.	"My Darkness"	Before the Dawn	4:16
2.	"Unbreakable"	Before the Dawn	3:30
3.	"Alone"	Before the Dawn	3:53
4.	"Father and Son"	Before the Dawn	4:20
5.	"Seed"	Before the Dawn	4:17
6.	"My Room"	Before the Dawn	5:17
7.	"Vengeance"	Before the Dawn	4:16
8.	"The Black"	Before the Dawn	4:36
9.	"Disappear"	Before the Dawn	4:14
10.	"Scar"	Before the Dawn	4:36
11.	"I Was Never There"	Dawn of Solace	6:54
12.	"Dead Air"	Dawn of Solace	5:18
13.	"Wings of Darkness Attached on the Children of the Light"	Dawn of Solace	7:23
14.	"Wrath"	Before the Dawn	4:08
15.	"Faithless"	Before the Dawn	3:15
16.	"Deadsong"	Before the Dawn	3:23
Total length:			73:36

Disc 2
No.	Title	Artist	Length
1.	"Dying Sun"	Before the Dawn	3:11
2.	"Monsters"	Before the Dawn	4:50
3.	"A Song for My Weakness"	Black Sun Aeon	4:41
4.	"A Song for My Funeral"	Black Sun Aeon	6:17
5.	"End of Days"	Before the Dawn	4:03
6.	"Frozen"	Black Sun Aeon	5:52
7.	"Routa"	Black Sun Aeon	5:17
8.	"River"	Black Sun Aeon	4:27
9.	"Winter Within"	Before the Dawn	4:32
10.	"Deathstar"	Before the Dawn	3:31
11.	"Brothers"	Black Sun Aeon	6:37
12.	"Solitude"	Black Sun Aeon	5:25
13.	"Oblivion"	Black Sun Aeon	4:46
14.	"Pitch Black Universe"	Before the Dawn	4:44
15.	"Throne of Ice"	Before the Dawn	6:31
Total length:			74:44

Disc 3 (unplugged album)
No.	Title	Artist	Length
1.	"Dead Air"	Dawn of Solace	5:18
2.	"Hide Me"	Before the Dawn	3:30
3.	"Monsters"	Before the Dawn	4:53
4.	"My Room"	Before the Dawn	5:17
5.	"Unbreakable"	Before the Dawn	3:30
6.	"Nightfall"	Dawn of Solace	4:16
7.	"I Was Never There"	Dawn of Solace	6:54
8.	"Frozen"	Dawn of Solace	4:08
9.	"Deadsong"	Before the Dawn	3:23
10.	"Morning Sun"	Before the Dawn	4:51
Total length:			46:00

Disc 4 (Before the Dawn live DVD)
No.	Title	Length
1.	"Pitch Black Universe"	4:44
2.	"Dying Sun"	3:11
3.	"Monsters"	4:50
4.	"Throne of Ice"	6:30
5.	"My Darkness"	4:16
6.	"Vengeance"	4:17
7.	"My Room"	5:17
8.	"I Was Never There"	6:52
9.	"The Black"	4:27
10.	"Phoenix Rising"	4:42
11.	"Fallen World"	4:22
12.	"Eclipse"	5:37
13.	"Deadsong"	3:25
14.	"Unbreakable"	3:30
Total length:		66:00

=== Music videos ===
- "A Song for My Weakness" (2009)
- "Frozen" (2010)
- "A Song for My Funeral" (2010)
- "Solitude" (2011)
