= Whole World =

Whole World may refer to:

- Bütün Dünya ("Whole World"), a Turkish publication
- The Whole World, a band formed by Kevin Ayers, later known as Kevin Ayers and The Whole World
- A Whole World, a sculpture by Dudu Gerstein

== Songs ==
- "Heel de wereld" ("The Whole World"), the Dutch entry in the 1958 Eurovision song contest
- "The Whole World", Big Boi and Dre Present... Outkast, Outkast, 2001
- "The Whole World", Walked All Night Long, Louisiana Red and Lefty Dizz, 1976
- "Whole World", Back to the Street, Petra, 1986
- "The Whole World", Dragon Ball Z Hit Song Collection V: Journey of Light, 1990
- "The Whole World", Converging Conspiracies, Comecon, 1993
- "The Whole World", Photographs & Tidalwaves, Holland, 2003
- "The Whole World", Really Really Happy, The Muffs, 2004
- "The Whole World", Songs I Wrote and Later Recorded, John McLaughlin, 2006
- "Whole World", Shine Through, Aloe Blacc, 2006
- "The Whole World", American Hunger, MF Grimm, 2006
- "The Whole World", Full Circle, Xzibit, 2006
- "The Whole World", Sound of a Rebel, Outlandish, 2009
- "The Whole World", The Words You Don't Swallow, Anarbor, 2010
- "Whole World", Sincerely Me, James Cottrial, 2010
- "Whole World", single, The Drifters, 2013
- "The Whole World", single, Consequence, 2014
- "Whole World", Let It Fly, Jonny Diaz, 2014
- "Whole World", soundtrack of The Boxtrolls, Dario Marianelli, 2014
- "The Whole World", single, Litesound, 2017
- "Whole World", Feet of Clay, Earl Sweatshirt, 2019

== See also ==
- Whole Earth (disambiguation)
- Worldwide (disambiguation)
