= Winterborn (album) =

Studio album by Wolfheart
- Released: 11 October 2013
- Genre: Melodic death metal
- Length: 49:34
- Label: Spinefarm Records
- Producer: Tuomas Saukkonen

Wolfheart chronology
Winterborn (2013)	Shadow World (2015)

Professional ratings
Review scores
Source	Rating
Imperiumi	9/10
Kaaoszine	9.5/10
PopMatters	7/10
Revolver	4/5
Soundi	3/5

Winterborn is the debut studio album by Finnish melodic death metal band Wolfheart, released in 2013. The album peaked at number seven on the official Finnish charts, and was voted the debut of the year by Levykauppa Äxä.

A music video was filmed for the song "Routa Pt. 2", which is a sequel to the title track of the Black Sun Aeon album Routa.

== Track listing ==
No.	Title	Length
1.	"The Hunt"	4:56
2.	"Strength and Valor"	4:09
3.	"Routa Pt. 2"	7:32
4.	"Gale of Winter"	4:41
5.	"Whiteout"	5:17
6.	"Ghosts of Karelia"	4:41
7.	"I"	4:48
8.	"Chasm"	7:37
9.	"Breathe"	5:53
Total length:		49:34

== Personnel ==
- Tuomas Saukkonen – vocals, all instruments
- Mika Lammassaari – guitar solos (tracks 1, 3, 5, 8 and 9)

=== Production ===
- Tuomas Saukkonen – producer
- Juho Räihä – recording engineer, mixer
- Aleksanteri Kuosa – recording engineer
- Heino Brand – graphics, layout
