= Shadow World (album) =

Studio album by Wolfheart
- Released: 15 August 2015
- Genre: Melodic death metal
- Length: 46:25
- Label: Spinefarm Records
- Producer: Tuomas Saukkonen

Wolfheart chronology
Winterborn (2013)	Shadow World (2015)	Tyhjyys (2017)

Professional ratings
Review scores
Source	Rating
Antihero Magazine	9/10
Blabbermouth.net	9/10
Imperiumi	9/10
Kaaoszine	9/10
Keskisuomalainen	3/5

Shadow World is the second studio album by Finnish melodic death metal band Wolfheart. It was released by Spinefarm Records in August 2015. The album peaked at number six on the Finnish Official Albums Chart.

Music videos were filmed for the songs "Aeon of Cold" and "Zero Gravity".

== Track listing ==
No.	Title	Length
1.	"Aeon of Cold"	6:34
2.	"Zero Gravity"	5:44
3.	"Storm Centre"	5:23
4.	"Last of All Winters"	4:46
5.	"Nemesis"	6:57
6.	"Abyss"	4:08
7.	"Resistance"	4:30
8.	"Veri"	8:23
Total length:		46:25

== Personnel ==
- Tuomas Saukkonen – vocals, guitar
- Mika Lammassaari – guitar
- Lauri Silvonen – bass, backing vocals
- Joonas Kauppinen – drums

=== Production ===
- Tuomas Saukkonen – producer
- Juho Räihä – recording engineer, mixer
- Saku Moilanen – recording (keyboards, grand piano & other vocals)
- Jens Bogren – mastering
- Heino Brand – graphics, design
- Janica Lönn – photographs
