= Flames of Perdition =

Studio album by Dawn of Solace
- Released: 28 January 2022
- Genre: Doom metal, gothic metal, melodic death metal
- Length: 39:33/49:02
- Label: Noble Demon

Dawn of Solace chronology
Waves (2020)	Flames of Perdition (2022)	Affliction Vortex (2025)

Singles from Flames of Perdition
- 1. "White Noise" Released: 30 August 2021; 2. "Skyline" Released: 25 September 2021; 3. "Event Horizon" Released: 18 November 2021

Professional ratings
Review scores
Source	Rating
Inferno	4/5 stars
Kaaoszine	5/5 stars
Soundi	3/5 stars

Flames of Perdition is the third studio album by Dawn of Solace. It was originally scheduled to be released on 12 November 2021 on the Noble Demon label but postponed to 28 January 2022.

The album debuted at number 27 on the Finnish official album chart and number 9 on the physical album chart.

== Track listing ==
1. "White Noise" – 5:48
2. "Erase" – 4:38
3. "Flames of Perdition" – 5:20
4. "Dying Light" – 5:19
5. "Event Horizon" – 3:51
6. "Black Shores" – 4:48
7. "Skyline" – 5:57
8. "Serenity" – 3:47
9. "Lead Wings" (Bonus Live Version) – 4:32
10. "Dead Air" (Bonus Live Version) – 4:57
