= King of the North (album) =

Studio album by Wolfheart
- Released: 16 September 2022
- Genre: Melodic death metal
- Length: 48:33
- Label: Napalm Records
- Producer: Tuomas Saukkonen

Wolfheart chronology
Wolves of Karelia (2020)	King of the North (2022)	Draconian Darkness (2024)

Professional ratings
Review scores
Source	Rating
Distorted Sound	9/10
Metal Storm	8.2/10
Soundi	3/5

King of the North is the sixth studio album by Finnish melodic death metal band Wolfheart, released on 16 September 2022, through Napalm Records. The album spawned the single "Ancestor", which features Killswitch Engage vocalist Jesse Leach.

The album debuted at number 12 on the Finnish official album chart and number 4 on the physical album chart.

== Track listing ==
No.	Title	Length
1.	"Skyforger"	7:33
2.	"Ancestor" (featuring Jesse Leach)	4:43
3.	"Knell"	5:32
4.	"Desolated Land"	5:18
5.	"The King"	4:56
6.	"Cold Flame" (featuring Karl Sanders)	5:49
7.	"Headstones"	4:16
8.	"Fires of the Fallen"	4:51
9.	"Eternal Slumber"	5:32
Total length:		48:33

== Personnel ==
- Tuomas Saukkonen – vocals, guitar
- Vagelis Karzis – guitar, clean vocals
- Lauri Silvonen – bass, backing vocals
- Joonas Kauppinen – drums

=== Guests ===
- Jesse Leach – vocals on "Ancestor"
- Karl Sanders – vocals on "Cold Flame"
- Saku Moilanen – keyboards, orchestrations

=== Production ===
- Tuomas Saukkonen – producer
- Juho Räihä – recording (drums, bass & rhythm guitar), mastering
- Saku Moilanen – recording (vocals, guitar melodies & acoustic guitar), mixing
- VisionBlack – cover art, layout
- Teppo Ristola – photographs
