= Deathstar Rising =

Studio album by Before the Dawn
- Released: February 25, 2011
- Genres: Gothic metal; melodic death metal
- Length: 41:09; 56:23 (with bonus tracks)
- Label: Nuclear Blast

Before the Dawn chronology
| Soundscape of Silence (2008) | Deathstar Rising (2011) | Rise of the Phoenix (2012) |

Professional ratings
Review scores
| Source | Rating |
|---|---|
| AllMusic | 3.5/5 stars |
| Rock Hard | 8/10 |

Deathstar Rising is the sixth studio album by Finnish melodic death metal band Before the Dawn, released on 25 February 2011 by Nuclear Blast.

== Track listing ==
| No. | Title | Length |
|---|---|---|
| 1. | "The First Snow" | 1:20 |
| 2. | "Winter Within" | 4:32 |
| 3. | "Deathstar" | 3:31 |
| 4. | "Remembrance" | 3:38 |
| 5. | "Unbroken" | 4:40 |
| 6. | "Judgement" | 4:20 |
| 7. | "The Wake" | 5:07 |
| 8. | "Sanctuary" | 4:52 |
| 9. | "Butterfly Effect" | 3:53 |
| 10. | "Wreith" | 5:16 |
| 11. | "Infinity (Demo 2000)" (European bonus track) | 3:02 |
| 12. | "My Room (Acoustic)" (European bonus track) | 4:27 |
| 13. | "Unbreakable (Live)" (European bonus track) | 3:18 |
| 14. | "The Black (Live)" (European bonus track) | 4:25 |

== Charts ==
| Chart (2011) | Peak position |
|---|---|
| Finnish Albums (Suomen virallinen lista) | 8 |
