= Waves (Dawn of Solace album) =

Studio album by Dawn of Solace
- Released: 24 January 2020
- Genre: Gothic metal, doom metal, death-doom
- Length: 40:58
- Label: Noble Demon

Dawn of Solace chronology
The Darkness (2006)	Waves (2020)	Flames of Perdition (2022)

Professional ratings
Review scores
Source	Rating
Imperiumi	8.5/10
Inferno	4/5 stars
Kaaoszine	9.5/10

Waves is the second studio album by Dawn of Solace, released on 24 January 2020 on Noble Demon.

== Track listing ==
1. Lead Wings – 4:47
2. Ashes – 5:57
3. Silence – 5:18
4. Hiding – 4:46
5. Tuli – 5:36
6. Numb – 5:30
7. Choice – 5:03
8. Ghost – 4:01
