= 4:17 am =

Studio album by Before the Dawn
- Released: May 24, 2004
- Studios: Sundi Corp.; additional recording at Pizzicato Room (Lahti) and Debonair Studios (London)
- Genres: Death-doom; melodic death metal; gothic metal
- Length: 46:48
- Label: Locomotive Music
- Producer: Aleksanteri Kuosa

Before the Dawn chronology
My Darkness (2003)	4:17 am (2004)	The Ghost (2006)

Professional ratings
Review scores
Source	Rating
Rock Hard	8/10

4:17 am is the second studio album by Finnish melodic death metal band Before the Dawn. It was released on May 24, 2004 through Locomotive Music. The music video for the single End of Days was released throughout Europe and in Japan.

The Metal Storm website gave the CD a 8.7, the highest rating for any of the band's albums. Gotherica rated it the 6th of "Top 10 Gothic & Alternative Albums of 2004, beating out Morrissey's You Are the Quary (sic.) and Penumbra's Seclusion, amongst others.

== Track listing ==
No.	Title	Length
1.	"Heaven"	4:15
2.	"Seed"	4:17
3.	"Dreamer"	3:53
4.	"Fade Away"	4:00
5.	"Crush"	5:21
6.	"Into You"	6:19
7.	"My Room"	5:17
8.	"The Black"	4:34
9.	"Vengeance"	4:19
10.	"Hiding"	4:33
