= Terrain (disambiguation) =

Terrain is the vertical and horizontal dimension of land surface.

Terrain may also refer to:

== Journals ==
- Terrain (journal), a French academic publication
- Terrain.org, online journal

== Music ==
- Terrain (Kids in the Kitchen album), 1987
- Terrain (Portico Quartet album), 2021

== Other uses ==
- Terrain (dance), a dance by Bangarra Dance Theatre, first choreographed in 2012
- Terrain (film), a 1994 Australian film

== See also ==
- Chaos terrain, chaotic planetary geology
- John Terraine (1921–2003), British writer and military historian
- Terrain mask, in aviation
- Terrain park, an outdoor area that contains terrain that allows snowboarders and skiers to do tricks
- Terrain rendering, in computer graphics
- Terran (disambiguation)
- Terrane, a geologic term
