= Rise of the Phoenix (album) =

Studio album by Before the Dawn
- Released: April 27, 2012
- Genre: Melodic death metal
- Length: 51:25
- Label: Nuclear Blast

Before the Dawn chronology
Deathstar Rising (2011)	Rise of the Phoenix (2012)	Stormbringers (2023)

Professional ratings
Review scores
Source	Rating
Rock Hard	8/10

Rise of the Phoenix is the seventh studio album by Finnish melodic death metal band Before the Dawn, released on 27 April 2012, and their last album before their split from 2013 to 2021. It is their second album released via Nuclear Blast Records, and unlike previous albums, does not include clean vocals.

== Background ==
On 8 February 2012, Tuomas released a video teaser of the album, followed by a second teaser on 21 March. A week later, the first single "Phoenix Rising" was released along with an official video. The second single "Pitch-Black Universe" was released with a video on 17 April.

== Track listing ==
No.	Title	Length
1.	"Exordium"	1:28
2.	"Pitch-Black Universe"	4:44
3.	"Phoenix Rising"	4:43
4.	"Cross to Bear"	3:30
5.	"Throne of Ice"	6:31
6.	"Perfect Storm"	4:43
7.	"Fallen World"	4:22
8.	"Eclipse"	5:39
9.	"Closure"	3:45
10.	"Unbreakable (2012 version)" (bonus track)	3:18
11.	"Deliverance" (bonus track)	3:27
12.	"Reflection (Demo 2000)" (bonus track)	5:23
Total length:		51:33

== Charts ==
Chart (2012)	Peak position
Finnish Albums (Suomen virallinen lista)	12
