= Tyhjyys =

Studio album by Wolfheart
- Released: 3 March 2017
- Genre: Melodic death metal
- Length: 43:55
- Label: Spinefarm Records
- Producer: Tuomas Saukkonen

Wolfheart chronology
Shadow World (2015)	Tyhjyys (2017)	Constellation of the Black Light (2018)

Professional ratings
Review scores
Source	Rating
All About the Rock	9/10
Distorted Sound	9/10
Louder Sound	3.5/5
Metal Storm	8.5/10
Soundscape Magazine	8/10

Tyhjyys is the third studio album by Finnish melodic death metal band Wolfheart. It was released by Spinefarm Records on 3 March 2017. A music video was made for the song "Boneyard".

== Track listing ==
No.	Title	Length
1.	"Shores of Lake Simpele"	3:17
2.	"Boneyard"	7:44
3.	"World on Fire"	6:23
4.	"The Flood"	6:06
5.	"The Rift"	5:25
6.	"Call of the Winter"	5:52
7.	"Dead White"	4:13
8.	"Tyhjyys"	4:55
Total length:		43:55

== Personnel ==
- Tuomas Saukkonen – vocals, guitar
- Mika Lammassaari – guitar
- Lauri Silvonen – bass, backing vocals
- Joonas Kauppinen – drums
- Olli Savolainen – keyboards

=== Production ===
- Tuomas Saukkonen – producer
- Juho Räihä – recording, mixing, mastering
- Saku Moilanen – recording
- VisionBlack – artwork, booklet
- Valtteri Hirvonen – photography
