= The Ghost (Before the Dawn album) =

2006 studio album

Studio album by Before the Dawn
- Released: March 26, 2006
- Genre: Gothic metal; death metal; melodic death metal
- Length: 40:43
- Label: Locomotive Music

Before the Dawn chronology
4:17 am (2004)	The Ghost (2006)	Deadlight (2007)

Professional ratings
Review scores
Source	Rating
AllMusic	3.5/5 stars
Rock Hard	6/10

The Ghost is the third studio album by Finnish melodic death metal band Before the Dawn, released on March 26, 2006, through Locomotive Music and Mazzar Records. The album style falls under the genres of gothic metal, death metal, and melodic death metal, Because of the huge amount of new song material, Saukkonen created another album, The Darkness, for Dawn of Solace.

== Track listing ==
No.	Title	Length
1.	"Disappear"	4:14
2.	"Repentance"	3:23
3.	"Away"	3:32
4.	"Scar"	4:28
5.	"Angel's Tombstone"	4:45
6.	"Black Dawn"	3:59
7.	"Enemy"	4:22
8.	"Stormbringer"	3:27
9.	"Ghost Town"	3:12
10.	"...Nowhere"	5:21
