= Dawn of Solace =

Finnish metal band

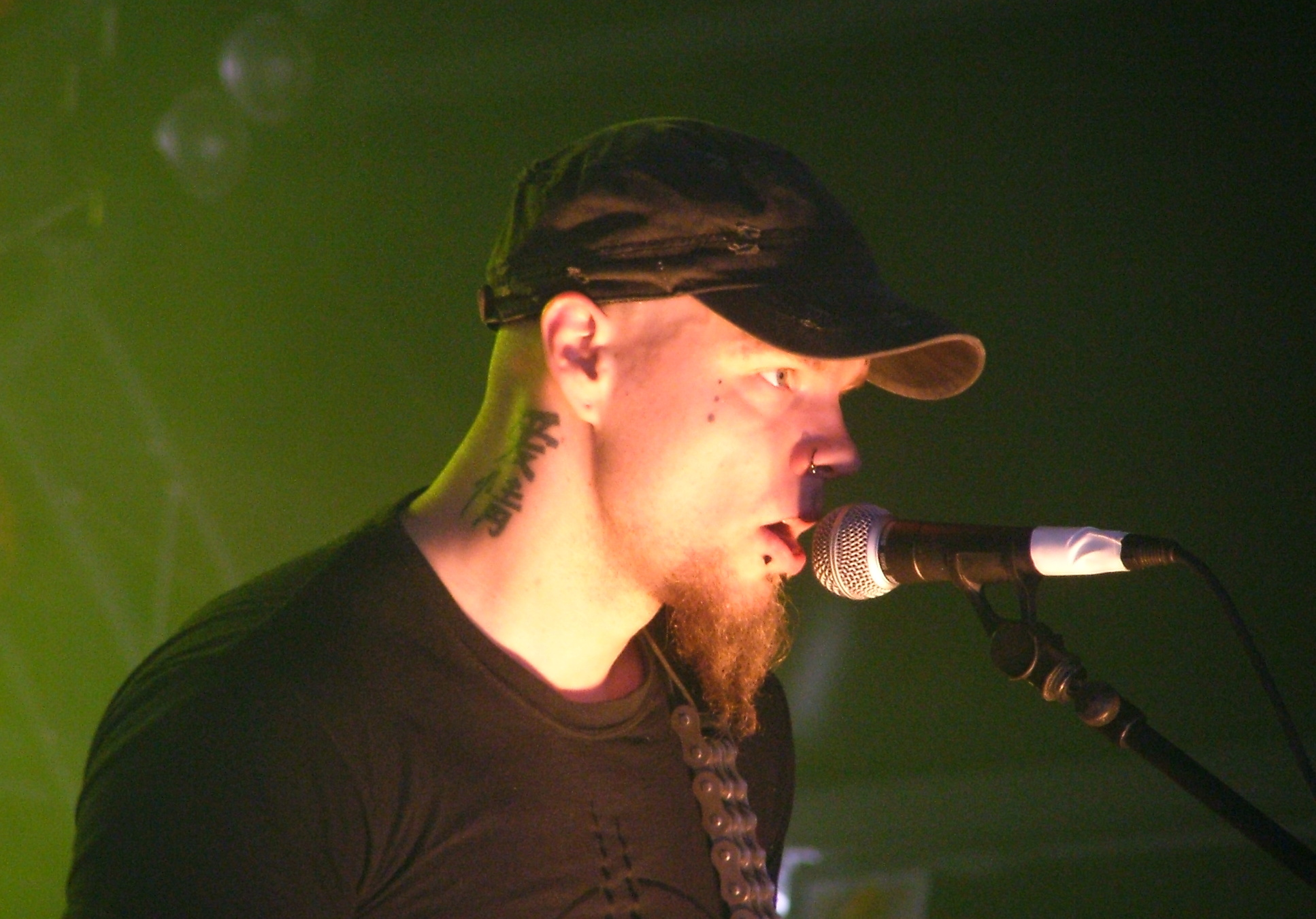
- Tuomas Saukkonen

Background information
- Origin: Finland
- Genres: Death-doom, gothic metal, doom metal, melodic death metal
- Years active: 2005–2006, 2019–present
- Labels: Dead Air; Noble Demon
- Members: Tuomas Saukkonen; Mikko Heikkilä
- Past members: Lars Eikind

Dawn of Solace is a heavy metal side-project from Finland, started in 2005 by Tuomas Saukkonen, founder of Before the Dawn and Wolfheart.

== History ==
While in the writing process for the third Before the Dawn album, The Ghost, Saukkonen ended up with over 30 written songs. The first plan was to make a double album for Before the Dawn, but some of the material was slower, more melodic and darker than the songs chosen for The Ghost and Saukkonen wanted to take things further without any limitations that Before the Dawn might create.

The result was Saukkonen's solo project, Dawn of Solace. The first album, entitled The Darkness, features a melodic sound akin to that of Before the Dawn, albeit with a much stronger gothic metal and doom metal influence. After the album's release, problems with the Dead Air label caused Dawn of Solace to be put on hold until 2019, when they were signed to their current label Noble Demon and had The Darkness re-released via that label in November 2019.

In December 2019, Saukkonen announced Dawn of Solace would be releasing their second album and first one in nearly 14 years, entitled Waves, released on 24 January 2020.

On 29 August 2021, a music video was released for the song "White Noise" from their then-upcoming third album Flames of Perdition, originally scheduled to be released on 12 November 2021 but postponed to 28 January 2022.

On 25 October 2024, it was announced that their fourth album Affliction Vortex will be released on 14 February 2025.

On 30 October 2026, it was announced that their fifth album Skeletons will be released on 12 February 2027.

== Members ==
=== Current members ===
- Tuomas Saukkonen – all instruments, harsh vocals (2005–2006, 2019–present)
- Mikko Heikkilä – clean vocals (2019–present)

=== Former members ===
- Lars Eikind – clean vocals (2005–2006)

== Discography ==
- The Darkness (2006)
- Waves (2020)
- Flames of Perdition (2022)
- Affliction Vortex (2025)
- Skeletons (2027)
