= Soundscape of Silence =

Studio album by Before the Dawn
- Released: October 29, 2008
- Genre: Doom metal; melodic death metal; gothic metal
- Length: 36:17
- Label: Stay Heavy Records

Before the Dawn chronology
Deadlight (2007)	Soundscape of Silence (2008)	Deathstar Rising (2011)

Professional ratings
Review scores
Source	Rating
Rock Hard	5/10

Soundscape of Silence is the fifth studio album by Finnish melodic death metal band Before the Dawn. It was released on 29 October 2008 through Stay Heavy Records.

== Track listing ==
No.	Title	Length
1.	"Dying Sun"	3:12
2.	"Exile"	4:00
3.	"Silence"	3:01
4.	"Dead Reflection"	3:42
5.	"Hide Me"	3:30
6.	"Fabrication"	3:51
7.	"Saviour"	3:15
8.	"Monsters"	4:51
9.	"Cold"	4:10
10.	"Last Song"	2:53
11.	"Ignite" (European bonus track)	3:06

== Charts ==
Chart (2008)	Peak position
Finnish Albums (Suomen virallinen lista)	14
