= Class M planet =

Fictional classification of planets in Star Trek

In the Star Trek universe, a Class M planet is a planet habitable by humans and similar life forms. Earth, Vulcan, Romulus, and Qo'noS are examples of Class M planets. The planet needs an atmosphere of oxygen and nitrogen and should be close to a stable star and have fertile soil, a tolerable gravity, and a climate that is generally pleasant for humans. Most planets shown in the franchise are Class M planets. Occasionally, another alphabetically named class of planet is shown, each hostile to humanoid life in one or more ways. As a story device, this allowed for easy filming without restriction by environmental suits, but Science correspondent Gretchen Vogel called it a "failure of imagination" when thinking about the limits of the zone capable of supporting life. The origin of the term within the fictional universe is implied to be the Vulcan word Minshara.

== See also ==
- Earth in science fiction
