= Constellation of the Black Light =

Studio album by Wolfheart
- Released: 28 September 2018
- Genre: Melodic death metal
- Length: 42:00
- Label: Napalm Records
- Producer: Tuomas Saukkonen, Juho Räihä

Wolfheart chronology
Tyhjyys (2017)	Constellation of the Black Light (2018)	Wolves of Karelia (2020)

Professional ratings
Review scores
Source	Rating
Distorted Sound	10/10
Ghost Cult Magazine	8/10

Constellation of the Black Light is the fourth studio album by Finnish melodic death metal band Wolfheart, released on 28 September 2018, through Napalm Records. The album spawned the singles "Breakwater" and "The Saw".

The opening track "Everlasting Fall" is the band's longest song at over 10 minutes. Band founder Tuomas Saukkonen explained, "The three-minute intro part was originally suppose to an intro track for the album but as the recordings and mixing went ahead the more it started to be a part of the song. I started writing the song as a whole piece but with the idea that it will be divided into two separate tracks in the mastering. When it comes to Spotify and other streaming platforms it is not an ideal song with that length and reaching the first chorus at six-minutes in [is not ideal] but when I look the album as a whole, that song needs to start the album." Following the album's release, Wolfheart supported Carach Angren on that band's North American tour.

== Track listing ==
No.	Title	Length
1.	"Everlasting Fall"	10:24
2.	"Breakwater"	5:30
3.	"The Saw"	5:00
4.	"Forge with Fire"	4:35
5.	"Defender"	4:49
6.	"Warfare"	5:55
7.	"Valkyrie"	5:47
Total length:		42:00

== Personnel ==
- Tuomas Saukkonen – vocals, guitar
- Mika Lammassaari – guitar
- Lauri Silvonen – bass, backing vocals
- Joonas Kauppinen – drums
- Olli Savolainen – keyboards

=== Production ===
- Tuomas Saukkonen – producer
- Juho Räihä – producer, recording, mixing, mastering
- Saku Moilanen – recording (bass)
- Glen Loit – recording (vocals)
- Olli Savolainen – recording (keyboards)
- Mika Lammassaari – recording (solos)
- VisionBlack – artwork, booklet
