= Deadlight (album) =

Studio album by Before the Dawn
- Released: April 4, 2007
- Genres: Melodic death metal; gothic metal; death-doom
- Length: 39:40
- Label: Stay Heavy Records

Before the Dawn chronology
The Ghost (2006)	Deadlight (2007)	Soundscape of Silence (2008)

Professional ratings
Review scores
Source	Rating
Rock Hard	6/10

Deadlight is the fourth studio album by Finnish melodic death metal band Before the Dawn. It was released on April 4, 2007 via Stay Heavy Records. This was a turning point in the history of the band, although also this time Tuomas was forced to play most of the instruments himself: "We had to fire the drummer after one week ... And then also our second guitarist was too busy with his other band recording, so I played all the guitars. So on the album it is only me and Lars."

== Track listing ==
No.	Title	Length
1.	"Wrath"	4:08
2.	"Faithless"	3:16
3.	"Fear Me"	4:30
4.	"Eternal"	4:02
5.	"Morning Sun"	4:52
6.	"Deadsong"	3:23
7.	"Guardian"	4:41
8.	"Star of Fire"	3:18
9.	"Reign of Fire"	3:16
10.	"..."	4:14
11.	"Bitter End" (Digipak bonus track)	3:25
12.	"Gehenna" (Digipak bonus track)	4:21

== Charts ==
Chart (2007)	Peak position
Finnish Albums (Suomen virallinen lista)	29
