= Wolves of Karelia =

Studio album by Wolfheart
- Released: 10 April 2020
- Genre: Melodic death metal
- Length: 40:50
- Label: Napalm Records
- Producer: Tuomas Saukkonen, Saku Moilanen

Wolfheart chronology
Constellation of the Black Light (2018)	Wolves of Karelia (2020)	King of the North (2022)

Professional ratings
Review scores
Source	Rating
Distorted Sound	9/10
Metal Storm	8.1/10
Sonic Perspectives	8.8/10
Soundi	4/5

Wolves of Karelia is the fifth studio album by Finnish melodic death metal band Wolfheart, released on 10 April 2020, through Napalm Records. The album spawned the singles "Hail of Steel" and "Horizon on Fire".

It is a concept album inspired by the Winter War. Band founder Tuomas Saukkonen had done heavy research on the topic for the concept and lyrics, stating "I did not want to take a Sabaton approach of just documenting great battles or soldiers, but rather, dive into the individual experiences of the chaos of war. Naturally, I could not avoid certain heroic points of view. After all, I was writing about stories of our nation’s heroes. A hugely outnumbered army including mainly farmers, against a huge army of Russians; war machinery with centuries of experience of invading and fighting great wars."

== Track listing ==
No.	Title	Length
1.	"Hail of Steel"	5:43
2.	"Horizon on Fire"	5:59
3.	"Reaper"	5:00
4.	"The Hammer"	6:09
5.	"Eye of the Storm" (instrumental)	2:35
6.	"Born from Fire"	5:16
7.	"Arrows of Chaos"	4:36
8.	"Ashes"	5:32
Total length:		40:50

== Personnel ==
- Tuomas Saukkonen – vocals, guitar
- Vagelis Karzis – guitar
- Lauri Silvonen – bass, backing vocals
- Joonas Kauppinen – drums
- Saku Moilanen – keyboards, orchestrations

=== Production ===
- Tuomas Saukkonen – producer
- Juho Räihä – mixing, mastering
- Saku Moilanen – recording, producer
- VisionBlack – cover art, layout
- Valtteri Hirvonen – photography
