= Mother Earth (sculpture) =

1921 neoclassical sculpture in Szczecin, Poland

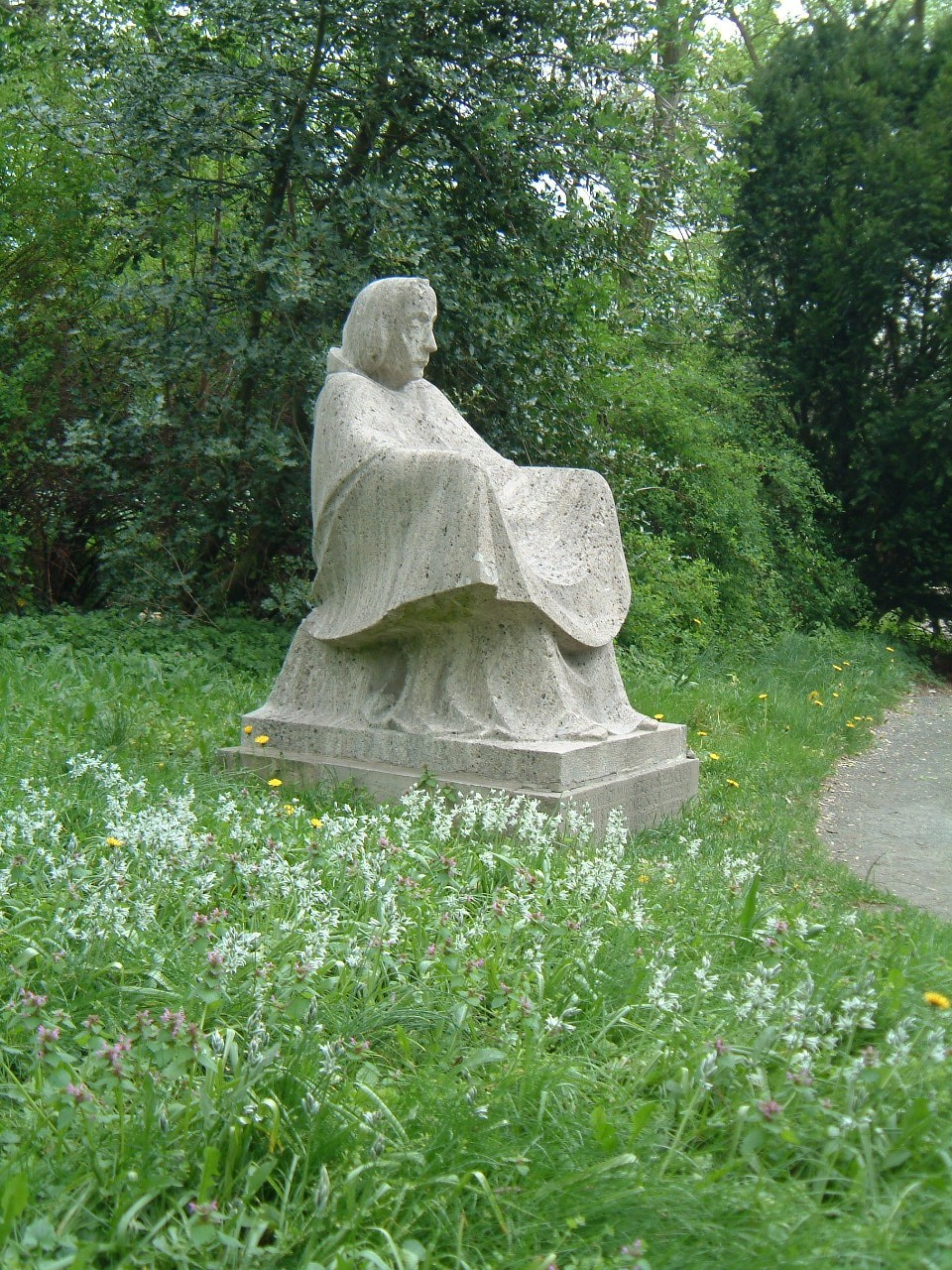
- The sculpture in Güstrow, Germany in 2003.
- Artist: Friedrich Bursch
- Designer: Ernst Barlach
- Year: 1921
- Dimensions: 146 cm (57 in)
- Location: Ernst Barlach Museum, 1 St. Gertrude Square, Güstrow, Mecklenburg–Western Pomerania, Germany; 53°47′43.43″N 12°10′09.25″E

Mother Earth (German: Mutter Erde; Polish: Matka Ziemia) is a sculpture displayed in Güstrow, in Mecklenburg–Western Pomerania, Germany, in front of the St. Gertrude Chapel at 1 St. Gertrude Square, which houses the Ernst Barlach Museum. The sculpture is made from the shell-bearing limestone, and has a simplified geometrical form, depicting an elderly woman in a sitting position. It was designed in 1920 by Ernst Barlach, and sculpted in 1921 by Friedrich Bursch. The same year, it was placed at the Central Cemetery in Szczecin, as a main decorative element of a family grave. In the 1960s it was removed from the display, and in 1967, it was transported to Güstrow, Germany. In 2011, its replica made from an artificial stone in 2011 by Monika Szpener, was placed at the Central Cemetery in Szczecin, Poland.

== History ==
The sculpture Mother Earth was commissioned by Szczecin-based merchant Richard Biesel, as the main element of his family grave. In 1920 sculptor Ernst Barlach based in Güstrow, Germany created two scaled models of the statue, which varied in sizes. One of them was in the scale of 1:2. Both models were later donated to the Szczecin Municipal Museum (now the Szczecin National Museum). They remained there until 6 August 1937, when they were removed from the collection, being deemed to be the degenerate art. One of them was sold to an unknown buyer for the price of 50 United States dollars, and the other, was exchanged to art dealer Karl Buchholz. Currently both models are part of the collection of the Ernst Barlach Museum in Güstrow.

The final statue, basing on the models, was sculpted in 1921 by Friedrich Bursch based in Hamburg. It was made from the shell-bearing limestone from Kirchheim unter Teck, Germany. The same year, it was placed at the Biesel family grave at the Central Cemetery, the third largest necropolis in Europe, and one of the largest in the world.

In the 1960s, the sculpture was removed among most of the German gravestones from the cemetery, which were then placed on a stockpile. It was partially damaged in the process. In 1963, was noticed by Bernhard Blaschke, the curator of the Ernst Barlach Museum in Güstrow, East Germany (now in Germany), who petitioned to have it moved to the museal collection. On 4 September 1964, it was approved by the Minister of Culture and Art of Poland, and transferred to a representative of the museum on 24 February 1967. It was transported to Germany, and placed at a park, and former cemetery, outside the St. Gertrude Chapel, which houses a branch of the Ernst Barlach Museum.

At the beginning of the 21st century, the Association for the Central Cemetery proposed the creation of the replica of the sculpture, the again display it at the necropolis in Szczecin. It was sculpted by Monika Szpener from the artificial stone, and unveiled at the Central Cemetery on 10 November 2011.

== Characteristics ==
The sculpture is made from the shell-bearing limestone, and has the height of 146 cm. It has a simplified geometrical form, and depicts an elderly woman, in a sitting position. Its evokes the connection of a person to the motherland, while its pose refers to Pietà, a is a subject in Christian art depicting Mary of Nazareth cradling the body of Jesus Christ after his Descent from the Cross, in the New Testament. The motherhood motive might have also been created in memory of Ernst Barlach's mother Johanna Luise Barlach, who committed suicide while the artist was working on the sculpture.

The sculpture is placed in a park in front of the St. Gertrude Chapel at 1 St. Gertrude Square in Güstrow, Germany. The building houses the Ernst Barlach Museum. A replica of the sculpture, made from an artificial stone in 2011 by Monika Szpener, is displayed at the Central Cemetery in Szczecin, Poland.

== Gallery ==
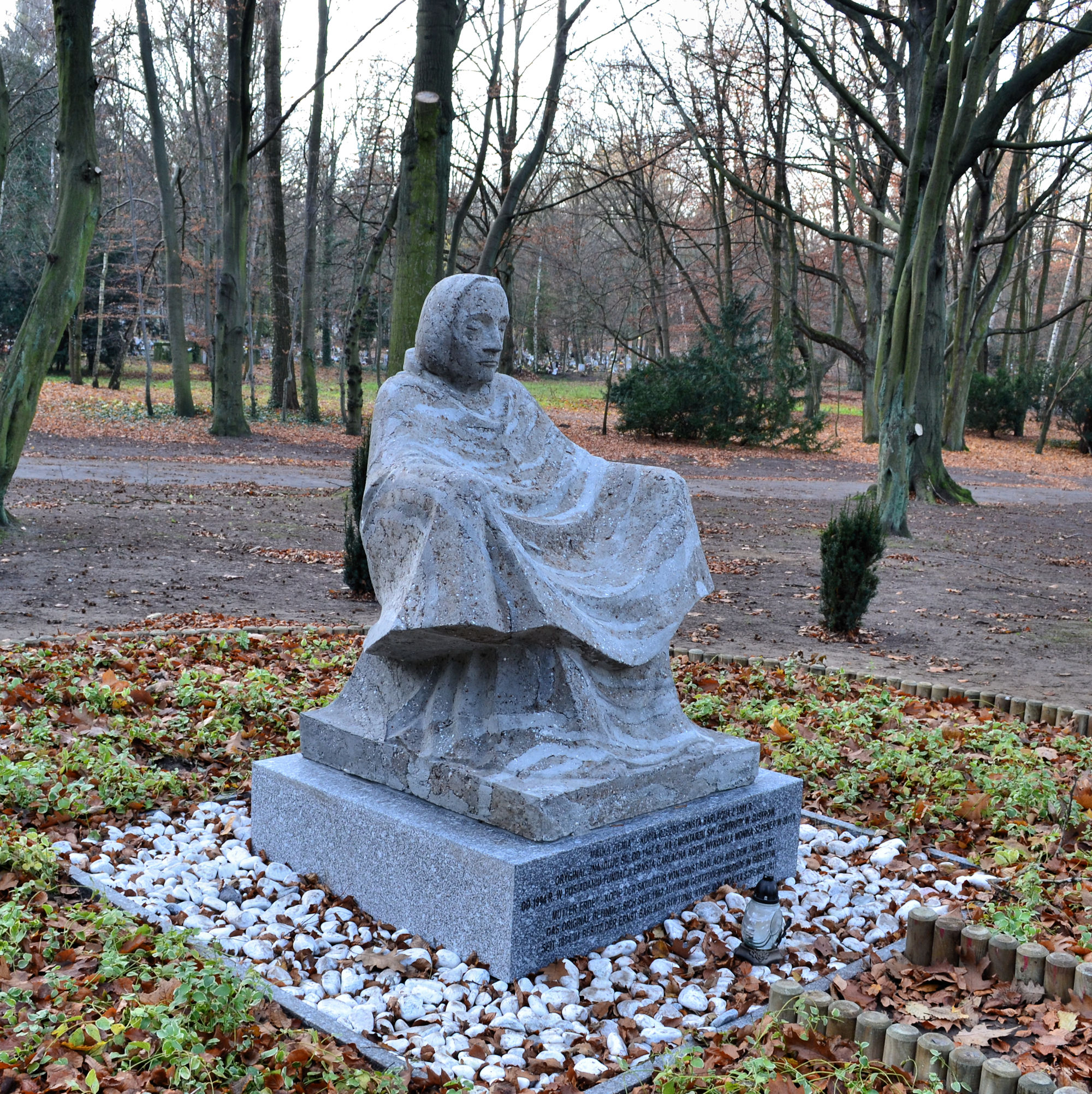
The replica of Ernst Barlach's Mother Earth sculpture in Szczecin, Poland.
