= Earth in science fiction =

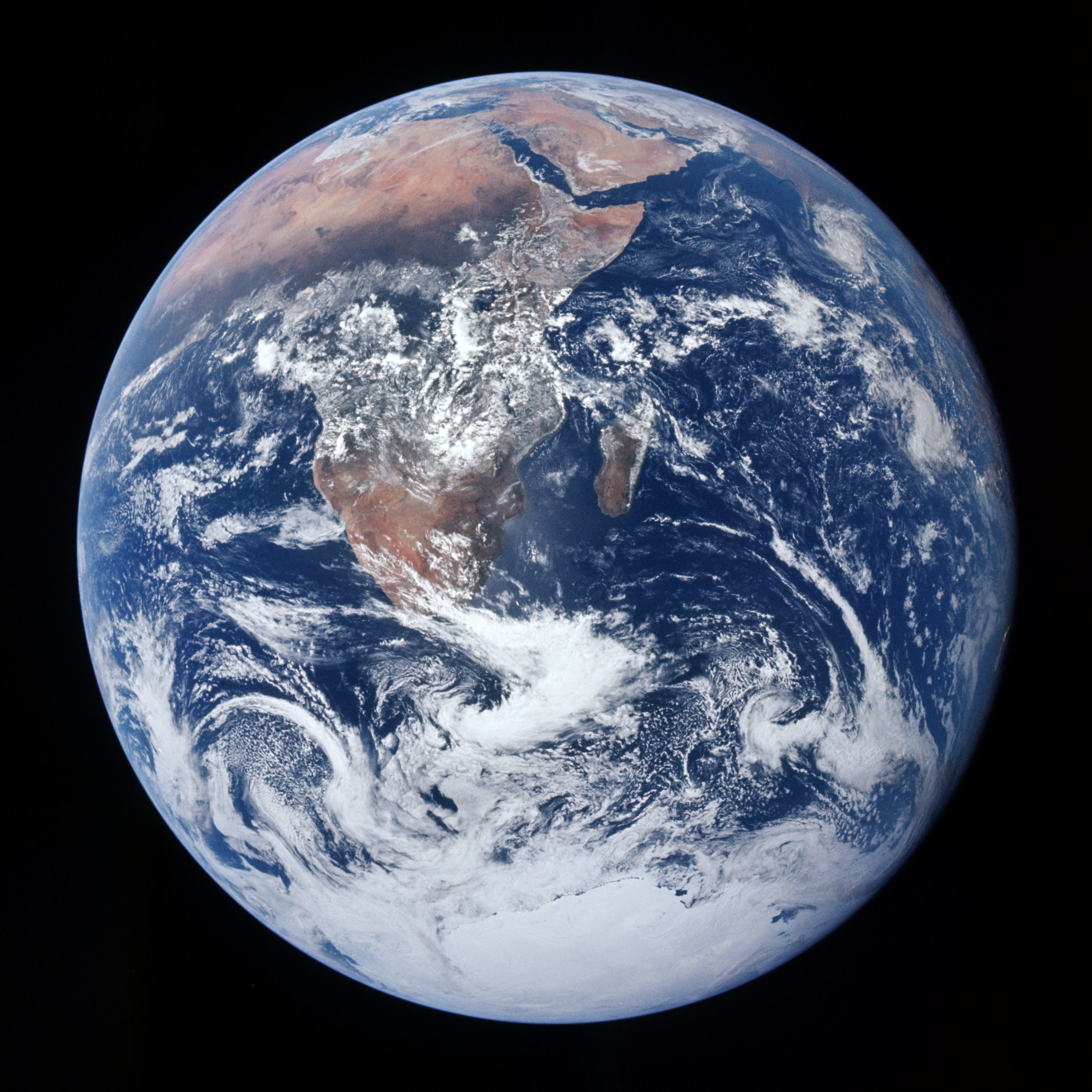
The iconic photo of Earth known as The Blue Marble, taken by the crew of Apollo 17 (1972). This and similar images might have popularized Earth as a theme in fiction.

The overwhelming majority of fiction is set on or features the Earth, as the only planet home to humans or known to have life. This also holds true of science fiction, despite perceptions to the contrary. Works that focus specifically on Earth may do so holistically, treating the planet as one semi-biological entity. Counterfactual depictions of the shape of the Earth, be it flat or hollow, are occasionally featured. A personified, living Earth appears in a handful of works. In works set in the far future, Earth can be a center of space-faring human civilization, or just one of many inhabited planets of a galactic empire, and sometimes destroyed by ecological disaster or nuclear war or otherwise forgotten or lost.

== Related vocabulary ==
In a number of works of science fiction, Earth's English name has become less popular, and the planet is instead known as Terra or Tellus, Latin words for Earth. Inhabitants of Earth can be referred to as Earthlings, Earthers, Earthborn, Earthfolk, Earthians, Earthies (this term being often seen as derogatory), Earthmen (and Earthwomen), Earthpersons, Earthsiders, Solarians, Tellurians, Terrestrials, Terrestrians, or Terrans.

In addition, science fiction vocabulary includes terms like Earthfall for landing of a spaceship on planet Earth; or Earth-type, Earthlike, Earthnorm(al) and terrestrial for the concept of "resembling planet Earth or conditions on it".

The concept of modifying planets to be more Earth-like is known as terraforming. The concept of terraforming developed from both science fiction and actual science. In science, Carl Sagan, an astronomer, proposed the terraforming of Venus in 1961, which is considered one of the first accounts of the concept. The term itself, however, was coined by Jack Williamson in a science-fiction short story ("Collision Orbit") published in 1942 in Astounding Science Fiction, although the concept of terraforming in popular culture predates this work; for example, the idea of turning the Moon into a habitable environment with atmosphere was already present in La Journée d'un Parisien au XXI^{e} siècle ("A Day of a Parisian in the 21st Century", 1910) by Octave Béliard.

== Themes ==
In general, the vast majority of fiction, including science fiction, takes place on Earth. To the extent that Earth is more than the obvious but forgettable background where the action of the story takes place, a number of themes have been identified.

=== Earth ===
Many works of science fiction focus on the outer space, but many others still take place on Earth; this distinction has been subject to debates among the science fiction authors, visible for example in J. G. Ballard's 1962 essay Which Way to Inner Space?. Some critics of the "outer space adventures" have pointed to the importance of "earthly" concepts and imagery closer to contemporary readers' everyday experience. While it has been argued that a planet can be considered "too large, and its lifetime too long, to be comfortably accommodated within fiction as a topic in its own right," this has not prevented some writers from engaging with said topic. (Note: for example, Camille Flammarion's Lumen (1887), David Brin's Earth (1990) or Terry Pratchett's, Ian Stewart's and Jack Cohen's The Science of Discworld (1999))

Some works that focus on Earth as an entity have been influenced by holistic, "big picture" concepts such as the Gaia hypothesis, noosphere and the Omega Point, and the popularizing of the photography of Earth from space. Others works have addressed the concept of Earth as a Goddess Gaia (Note: as seen, among others, in the 1990 cartoon Captain Planet and the Planeteers) (from Greek mythology; another prominent goddess of Earth whose name influenced science fiction was the Roman Terra or Tellus). Bridging these ideas, and treating Earth as a semi-biological or even sentient entity, are classic works like Arthur Conan Doyle's When the World Screamed (1928) and Jack Williamson's Born of the Sun (1934).

=== Shape ===
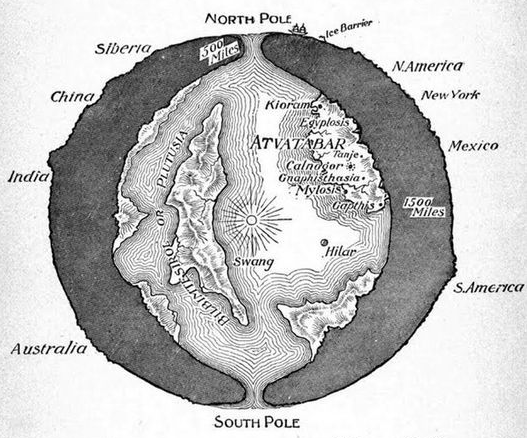
A map of "The Interior World", from The Goddess of Atvatabar by William Bradshaw (1892)

Depictions of the Earth as being flat are uncommon in modern works, the sphericity of the planet having been proved around 200 B.C. by Archimedes and Eratosthenes. Exceptions to this include Terry Pratchett's satirical Discworld series—which was inspired by Hindu cosmology—and deliberately provocative works like S. Fowler Wright's novel Beyond the Rim from 1932. There have also been fictional accounts of a hollow Earth, such as Edgar Allan Poe's 1838 novel The Narrative of Arthur Gordon Pym of Nantucket inspired by John Cleves Symmes Jr.'s model featuring openings at the north and south poles whereby the interior can be accessed. A few writers have likewise engaged with another old fringe theory, that of Counter-Earth – a hypothetical planet that orbits on the other side of the solar system from Earth. (Note: ex. John Norman's Tarnsman of Gor (1966))

Many stories portray Earth as known to modern science, but the exploration of its subterrean depths, relatively consistent with the knowledge of modern geology, is still subject to a number of works. Brian Stableford listed among "notable accounts of burrowing expeditions" into such an Earth works such as Harry Harrison's "Rock Diver" (1951).

=== Planetary engineering ===
Large scale planetary engineering includes ideas such as adjusting the Earth's axial tilt, (Note: ex. Nat Schachner's Earthspin, 1937) or moving the Earth from its orbit. (Note: for example, Homer Eon Flint's The Planeter (1918), Neil Bell's The Seventh Bowl (1930), Edmond Hamilton's Thundering Worlds (1934), Fritz Leiber's A Pail of Air (1951), Frederik Pohl's and C.M. Kornbluth's Wolfbane (1957), Roger McBride Allen's The Ring of Charon (1990) and Liu Cixin The Wandering Earth (2000), the latter becoming a Chinese blockbuster movie in 2019) Some works deal with geoengineering, a term usually referred to large-scale projects attempting to deal with the problem of climate change; a theme common in many works of climate fiction. In the extreme case, Earth can be consumed in its entirety, all of its mass repurposed in construction of megastructures such as a Dyson sphere. (Note: ex. Karl T. Pflock's Conservation of Mass (1982))

=== The end of Earth ===
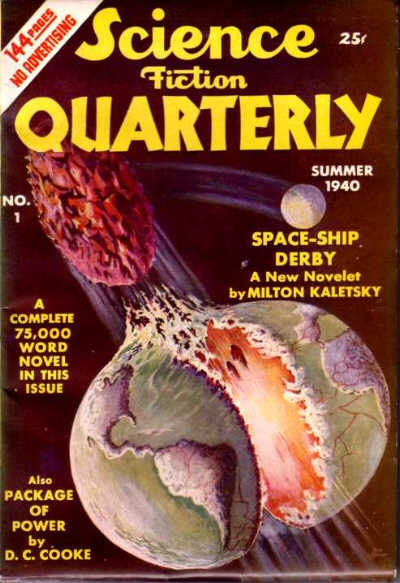
Cover of Science Fiction Quarterly Summer 1940, depicting the destruction of Earth

Various versions of the future of Earth have been imagined. Some works focus on the end of the planet; those have been written in all forms – some focused on "ostentatious mourning"; (Note: George C. Wallis' The Last Days of Earth (1901), Edmond Hamilton's Requiem (1962)) others more of a slapstick comedy; (Note: Douglas Adams' The Restaurant at the End of the Universe, (1980)) yet others take this opportunity to explore themes of astronomy or sociology. (Note: Frank Belknap Long's The Blue Earthman (1935) or Brian W. Aldiss' Hothouse (1962)) The genre of climate fiction can often mix the themes of near and far future consequences of the climate change, whether anthropogenic (Note: for example, George Turner's The Sea and Summer (1987), John Barnes' Mother of Storms (1994), Kim Stanley Robinson's Science in the Capitol trilogy begun with Forty Signs of Rain (2004)) or accidental. (Note: for example, Fred Hoyle's The Black Cloud (1957), Philip José Farmer's Flesh (1960), Val Guest's The Day the Earth Caught Fire (1961), John Christopher's The World in Winter (1962) and J. G. Ballard's The Drowned World (1962))

In other works, often found in the apocalyptic and post-apocalyptic fiction and the Dying Earth genres, Earth has been destroyed or at least ruined for generations to come; many such works are therefore set in the background of Earth changed into a wasteland. (Note: ex. Kevin Reynolds's Waterworld (1995)) Some of the works in these genres overlap with the climate change genre, as climate change and resulting ecological disasters are a commonly used plot device for events that trigger the fall of human civilization (other plots involve the destruction of Earth from human warfare, alien invasions, (Note: for example, in Karel Čapek's War With the Newts (1936); Douglas Adams' The Hitchhiker's Guide to the Galaxy (1978) or in the 2000 movie Titan A.E.) or from various sorts of man-made incidents (Note: ex. Piers Anthony's Rings of Ice (1974), Hajime Yatate's Cowboy Bebop (1998)) or accidental disasters). Many such works, set either during the disaster, or in its aftermath, are metaphors for environmental concerns or otherwise warnings about issues the writers think humanity needs to be concerned about.

=== One planet among many ===
For many works set in the far future, Earth is just one of many inhabited planets of a galactic empire, federation or larger civilization, and many similar planets have been found or created (common themes in space opera), all of which challenges the idea of Earth's uniqueness. (Note: James Blish's Earthman, Come Home (1953)) In some works, Earth is still a center of the known universe, or at least a significant player on the galactic scene. (Note: ex. Gene Roddenberry's Star Trek (1965); see also Terran Federation) In others, Earth has become of so little importance that it is a mostly forgotten backwards world. (Note: such as in Poul Anderson's The Chapter Ends (1954), or Yoshiki Tanaka's Legend of Galactic Heroes series (1982)) In Clifford D. Simak's Cemetery World (1973) Earth is a planet-size cemetery and in Gordon R. Dickson's Call Him Lord (1966), a museum. At its extreme, in some settings, knowledge of Earth has been simply lost, making it a mythological place, whose existence is questioned by the few who even know the legends about it. (Note: ex. in Isaac Asimov's Foundation series (1942)) In some of these works, a major plotline can involve future civilizations or intrepid explorers seeking the "lost cradle" or Earth. (Note: for example, E. C. Tubb's Dumarest saga (1967), Keiko Takemiya Toward the Terra (1977) and Glen A. Larson's Battlestar Galactica (1978)) Finally, some stories told from the perspective of aliens focus on their discovery of Earth. (Note: Edmond Hamilton's The Dead Planet (1946); Hal Clement's Iceworld (1953), Iain M. Banks's The State of the Art (1991))

=== A different history ===
Some works look backwards – or perhaps sideways, not to the future of Earth, but to its past; here, works of science fiction can overlap with historic fiction as well as prehistoric fiction. This can happen particularly through the genres of alternate history (Note: for example, Terry Pratchett and Stephen Baxter's Long Earth series) as well as time travel (where as Gary Westfahl observed, most time travellers travel through time much more than space, visiting the past or future versions of Earth).

== See also ==
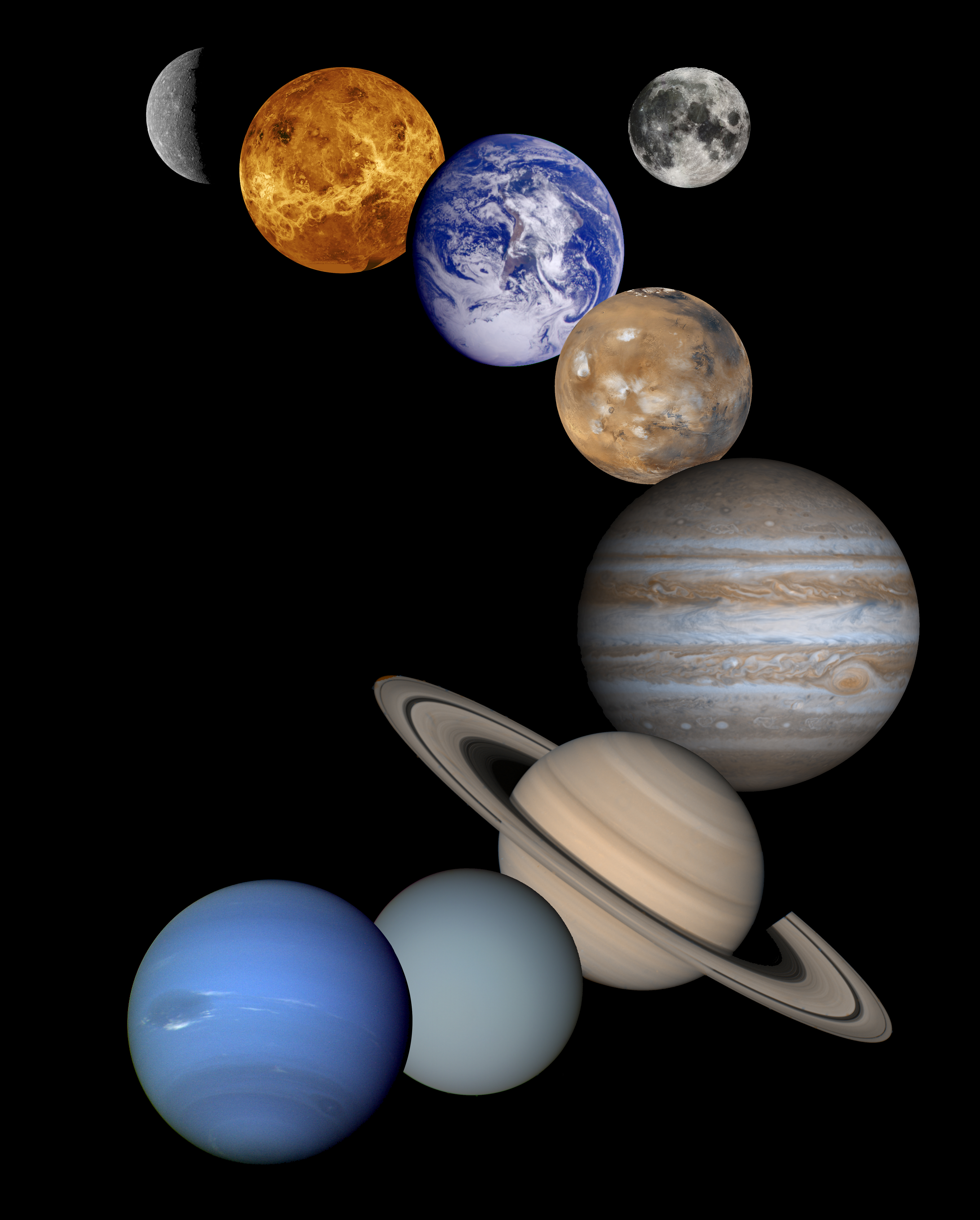
Clicking on a planet leads to the article about its depiction in fiction.

- Class M planet – Fictional classification of planets in Star Trek
- Earth Is Room Enough
- Ecofiction
- Mythopoeia
- Near future in fiction
- Pastoral science fiction
