= The Earthlings =

The Earthlings is a musical collaboration between British-born Marucs Hill & Paul Burgess performing an unusual blend of acoustic music incorporating humour and character based lyrics.

== Early years ==
Both Hill & Burgess attended Bishop Luffa secondary school in Chichester and when they met in the late 1980s it was clear they shared a similar sense of humour. It was in 1990 that Nuclear Freakout was formed along with fellow school friend Robert Thurston. Thurston left the following year and it was Hill & Burgess along with other school friends that continued under the Freakout banner. Much of Freakout's music was based on recorded improvisations between Hill & Burgess but also included recordings of various line-ups of school friends. They released a tape of demos in 1991 & two albums. 'Rub me up the wrong way' in 1995 which drew from material recorded between 1990–94 and the follow-up 'Rub me up the right way' in 1996. Plans for a third album never materialised.

== Earthlings Calling Earthlings ==
As their teenage years drew to a close, Hill & Burgess decided to develop their ideas into a more refined music. They spent 1997 recording which resulted in the 'Earthlings Calling Earthlings' album and the subsequent drop of the Nuclear Freakout name. The album was released in March 1998 and even achieved a small amount of air play on BBC national radio. The album showcased the unique writing style which incorporated lyrics about bizarre characters which Hill & Burgess would act out in the songs. The music was catchy and melodic, although quite odd and unique.

== Sessions ==
The Earthlings music is dominantly improvised. Hill & Burgess compose the vast majority of their music in what they refer to as their 'sessions'. This involves setting up in a recording environment and improvising ideas. Burgess provides the Guitar backing and usually the chorus while Hill dominates the lyrics and verses. The results are recorded and sometimes ideas are developed further at a later time. To date, Hill & Burgess have a huge archive of the session recordings dating from the early 1990s to 2009.

== Keeping My Eye On You ==
Work began on the follow-up to 'Earthlings Calling Earthling' in late 2002. Whereas the previous album was dominantly acoustic, this time they opted for the standard drums, bass, guitar sound using drummer James Aslett. Burgess also brought in the Brighton based fiddler Tim Cotterell for fiddle duties on a number of tracks. The album was finally mixed and released in December 2006.

== Future plans ==
The Earthlings announced recently that work had commenced on their third album. In July 2010 'Earthlings Calling Earthlings' was remastered for release on to popular download stores such as iTunes and Amazon.
