= George C. Wallis =

British printer, cinema manager and author (1871–1956)

George C. Wallis (1871–1956) was a British printer, cinema manager and writer, best known for his forays into science-fiction literature. He has published many novels, such as Killing London and The Call of Peter Gaskell. He is also known for creating scientific romances, such as The Last Sacrifice.

Wallis was born on 18 March 1871 and raised in Weedon, Nottinghamshire. He died in Sheffield, Yorkshire, on 1 September 1956.
