= Affliction Vortex =

Studio album by Dawn of Solace
- Released: 14 February 2025
- Genre: Doom metal, gothic metal, melodic death metal
- Length: 39:15
- Label: Noble Demon

Dawn of Solace chronology
Flames of Perdition (2022)	Affliction Vortex (2025)

Singles from Affliction Vortex
- 1. "Murder" Released: 28 October 2024; 2. "Fortress" Released: 29 November 2024; 3. "Invitation" Released: 17 January 2025

Professional ratings
Review scores
Source	Rating
Soundi	3/5 stars

Affliction Vortex is the fourth studio album by Dawn of Solace, released on 14 February 2025.

The album has spawned two music videos for the songs "Murder" and "Fortress".

== Track listing ==
1. "Inception" – 1:38
2. "Murder" – 3:47
3. "Fortress" – 4:19
4. "Into the Light" – 4:51
5. "Rival" – 4:48
6. "Invitation" – 4:37
7. "Dream" – 4:40
8. "Perennial" – 4:15
9. "Mother Earth" – 6:20
