= Before the Dawn (band) =

Finnish melodic death metal band

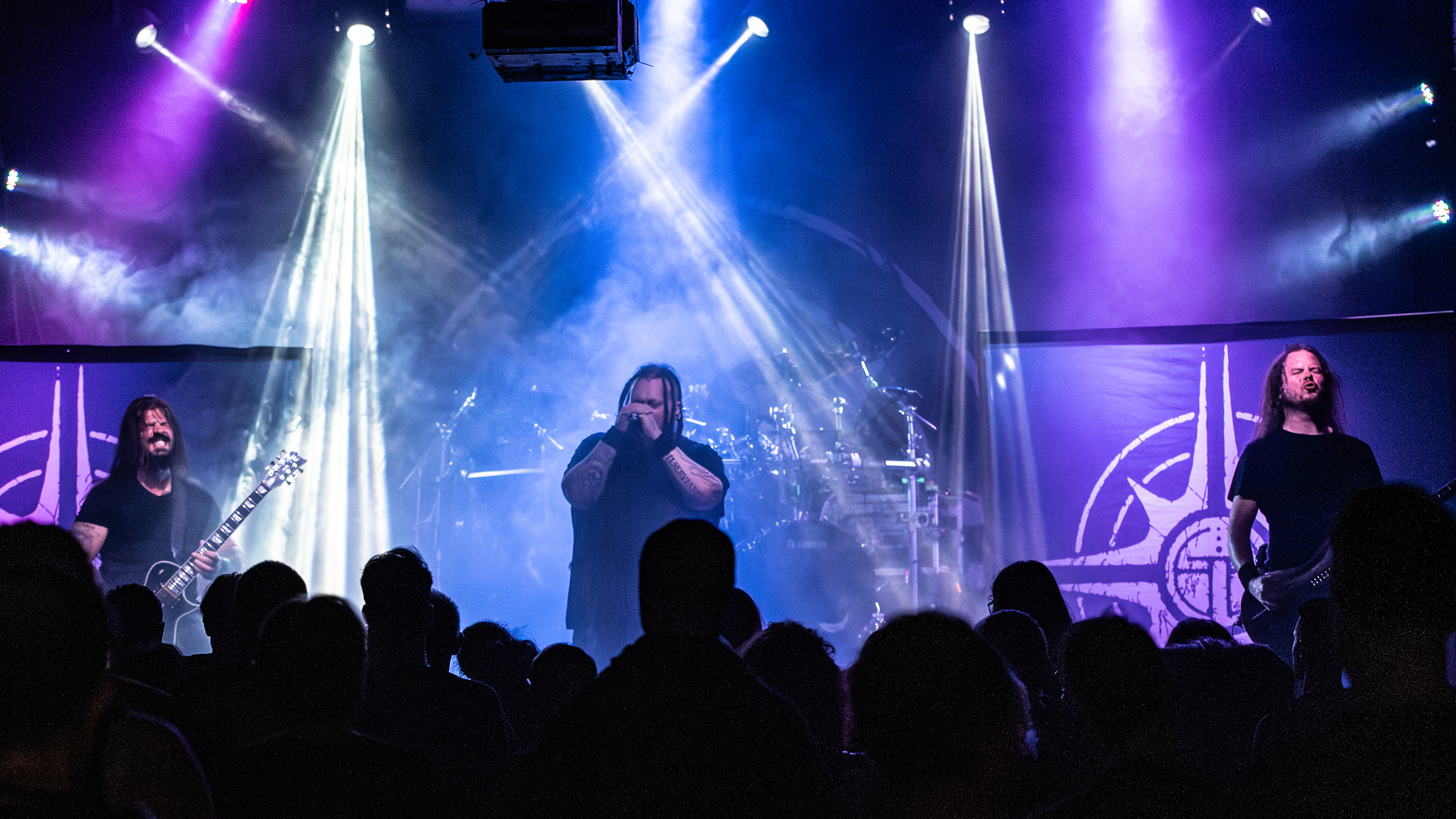
- Before the Dawn performing in 2025

Background information
- Origin: Finland
- Genres: Melodic death metal; death-doom; gothic metal
- Years active: 1999–2013, 2021–present
- Labels: Napalm; Nuclear Blast; Locomotive; Stay Heavy
- Members: Tuomas Saukkonen; Juho Räihä; Pyry Hanski; Paavo Laapotti
- Past members: Kimmo Nurmi; Panu Willman; Dani Miettinen; Mika Ojala; Atte Palokangas; Joonas Kauppinen; Lars Eikind

Before the Dawn is a Finnish melodic death metal band formed in 1999 by Tuomas Saukkonen.

== History ==
The band was founded in 1999 by Tuomas Saukkonen as his solo project: "I played and recorded all instruments in the first demo To Desire Part 1 by on my own then for the second demo I had a friend of mine on the drums. The first line-up was gathered so that BTD could perform live. With many changes in the line up BTD entered the studio to record the MCD called Gehenna. I received couple of deal offers but nothing serious enough. BTD continued playing gigs and I kept on writing lots of new material, and the next MCD called My Darkness got very good feedback and a serious enough record deal was offered by Locomotive Music."

Joined by Panu Willman, Mike Ojala, and Kimmo Nurmi, the newly formed lineup released their first full-length album, My Darkness, in 2003. It was followed up by a second album in 2004, 4:17 am. The band supported Katatonia on a Scandinavian and European tour in 2003.

The Ghost followed, released in 2006. Because of the huge amount of song material written for that album, Saukkonen created another album, The Darkness, for a side-project, Dawn of Solace.

With Lars and Juho as new permanent band members, the band released the next full-length album Deadlight in 2007. The single "Deadsong", released in February 2007, immediately reached #2 on Finnish Top 20 charts; for four months it remained among the Top 20 of Finnish Radio Rock. The single "Faithless" featuring Jone Nikula on the Pantera cover "Mouth for War", reached #2 on the Finland Top 20 charts for the week of 15 July 2007.

During the recording sessions for the fifth studio album Soundscape of Silence, drummer Dani Miettinen dropped out; the band decided to leave the position vacant and work with session drummers for live shows (e.g. Matti Auerkallio). Right after its release at the end of October 2008, Soundscape of Silence went to the top 20 of Finnish album charts (#14). The core band members were later joined by drummer Atte Palokangas (from the band Agonizer). Atte became an official new band member in mid-2009, and Before the Dawn supported Amorphis on their Forging Europe Tour in late 2009 with a completed line-up.

The anniversary EP Decade of Darkness went straight to #1 on Finnish single charts after its release in spring 2010. The music video for "End of Days" from this EP was released throughout Europe and in Japan; it shows footage from the band's 2010 shows in Asia. The European edition of this EP, released in February 2011, contains a bonus DVD with footage of the band's concert at German Summerbreeze Festival 2009.

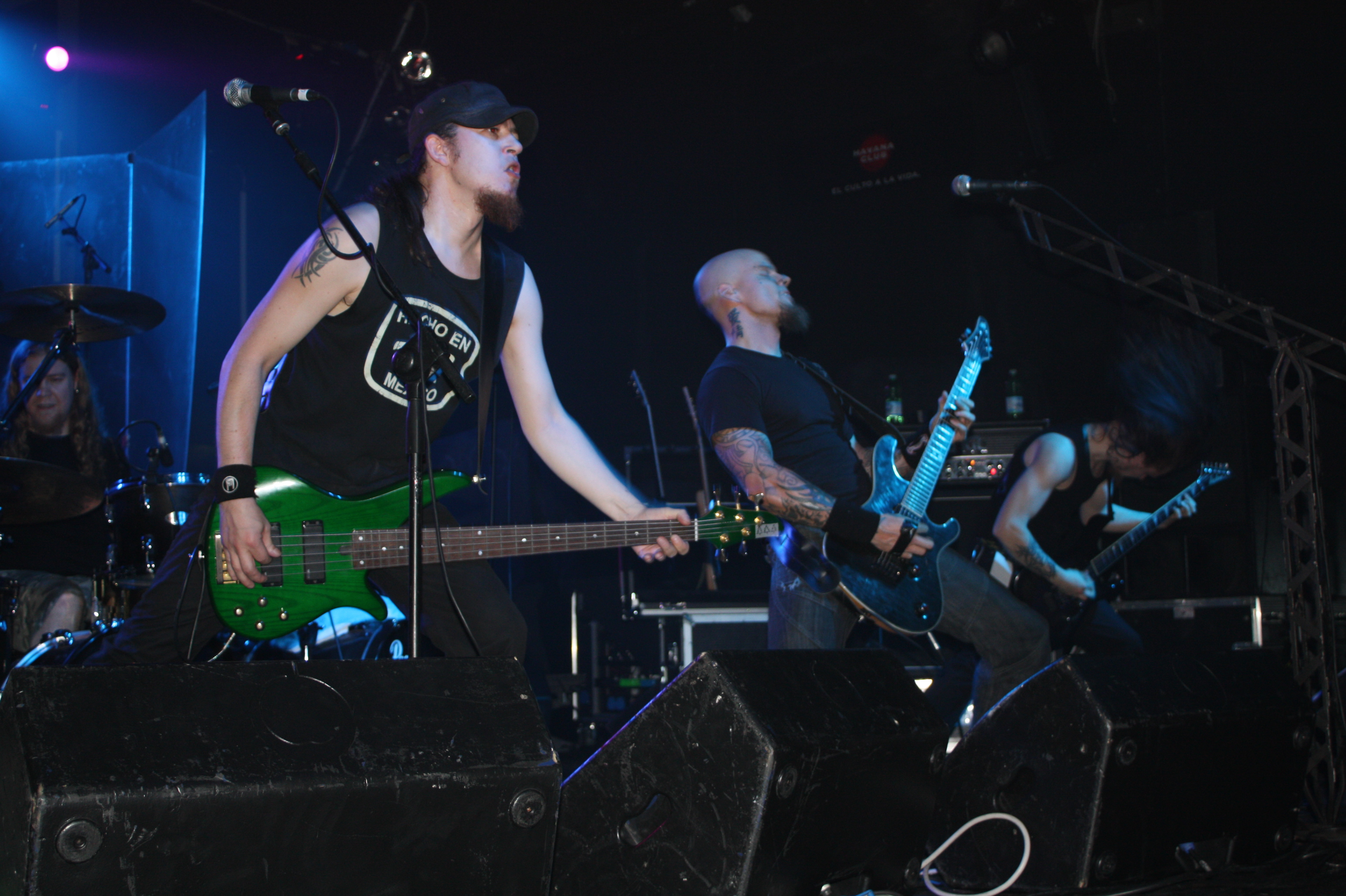
Before the Dawn in 2009

In February 2011, Tuomas Saukkonen won the Finnish Metal Award in the category "Best Instrumentalist"; Before the Dawn reached #3 in the category "Best Band". Tuomas defended this title successfully in the year 2012 as well.

The new album Deathstar Rising cracked the Finnish Album Top 10 and reached #8 in first week of March 2011.

In June 2011 bassist and vocalist Lars and drummer Atte left the band; Lars for personal reasons and Atte for musical reasons. On 25 January 2012 the band announced on their Facebook page that Rise of the Phoenix would be the title of their new album. It was released through Nuclear Blast Records on 27 April 2012.

On 10 January 2013 through a press statement, Tuomas Saukkonen announced that he was putting Before the Dawn to rest along with his other active bands (Black Sun Aeon and RoutaSielu), ending them in order to create new project called "Wolfheart", which he will entirely focus from now on.

In 2021, Before the Dawn was reformed. On 30 April, the band released the single "The Final Storm". The single was made for the Deadlight reissue which was released in 9 July 2021. On 7 September 2022 BTD announced that a new member Paavo Laapotti joins the band as a vocalist, while Tuomas takes up live drumming. Laapotti brought attention of the band during The Voice of Finland where he sang a Before the Dawn song called Deadsong. An album titled Stormbringers was released on 30 June 2023.

On 7 February 2024, they announced a new EP Archaic Flame, its title song is available online. The premiere of the new EP is scheduled to be released on 8 March. It is followed by their ninth studio album, Cold Flare Eternal, released on 5 September 2025.

== Members ==
Current

- Tuomas Saukkonen – guitar (1999–2013, 2021–present); drums (2022–present); unclean vocals (1999–2013, 2021–2022); bass (1999–2013)
- Juho Räihä – guitar (2005–2013, 2022–present)
- Pyry Hanski – bass (2011–2013, 2022–present)
- Paavo Laapotti – lead vocals (2022–present)

Former

- Kimmo Nurmi – drums (2000–2001)
- Panu Willman – guitar, clean vocals (2003–2004)
- Dani Miettinen – drums (2003–2004)
- Mika Ojala – keyboards (2003–2004)
- Atte Palokangas – drums (2009–2011)
- Joonas Kauppinen – drums (2011–2013)
- Lars Eikind – bass, clean vocals (2005–2011, 2021–2022)

Timeline

== Discography ==
=== Studio albums ===
Title	Release date	Label
My Darkness	2003	Locomotive Music
4:17 am	2004	Locomotive Music
The Ghost	2006	Locomotive Music
Deadlight	2007	Stay Heavy Records
Soundscape of Silence	2008	Stay Heavy Records
Deathstar Rising	2011	Stay Heavy Records
Rise of the Phoenix	2012	Nuclear Blast
Stormbringers	2023	Napalm Records
Cold Flare Eternal	2025	Reaper Entertainment

=== Demos ===
Title	Release date	Label
To Desire	2000	Independent

=== Videography ===
==== DVD ====
Title	Release date	Label
The First Chapter	2006	Locomotive Music

==== Music videos ====
Year	Title	Director	Album
2001	"Not Divine as Them"	Unknown	Gehenna EP
2006	"Black Dawn"	Wille Hyvönen	The Ghost
2006	"Disappear"	Markus Kangas	The Ghost
2007	"Deadsong"	Jani Saajanaho	Deadlight
2007	"Faithless"	Antti Jokinen	Deadlight
2008	"Dying Sun"	Nadi Hammouda	Soundscape of Silence
2010	"End of Days"	Unknown	Decade of Darkness EP
2011	"Deathstar"	Tuomas Saukkonen	Deathstar Rising
2012	"Phoenix Rising"	OneManArmy Productions	Rise of the Phoenix
2012	"Pitch-Black Universe"	OneManArmy Productions	Rise of the Phoenix
2021	"Final Storm"	Tuomas Saukkonen	Deadlight – II Decades Of Darkness
2022	"Downhearted"	Tuomas Saukkonen	Downhearted
2023	"Destroyer"	Tuomas Saukkonen	Stormbringers
2023	"Chains"	Tuomas Saukkonen	Stormbringers
2023	"The Dark"	Tuomas Saukkonen	Stormbringers
2024	"Archaic Flame"	Tuomas Saukkonen	Archaic Flame EP

=== EPs ===
Title	Release date	Label
Gehenna	2001	Independent
My Darkness	2002	Independent
Decade of Darkness	2010	Stay Heavy Records
Decade of Darkness (EU edition; + bonus DVD)	2011	Cyclone Empire
Archaic Flame	2024	Napalm Records

=== Singles ===
Title	Release date	Label
"Deadsong"	2007	Stay Heavy Records
"Faithless"	2007	Stay Heavy Records
"The Final Storm"	2021	Stay Heavy Records
"Downhearted"	2022	Stay Heavy Records
"Destroyer"	2023	Napalm Records
"Chains"	2023	Napalm Records
"The Dark"	2023	Napalm Records
"Archaic Flame"	2024	Napalm Records
