= Trembling Earth =

Yankton Dakota chief

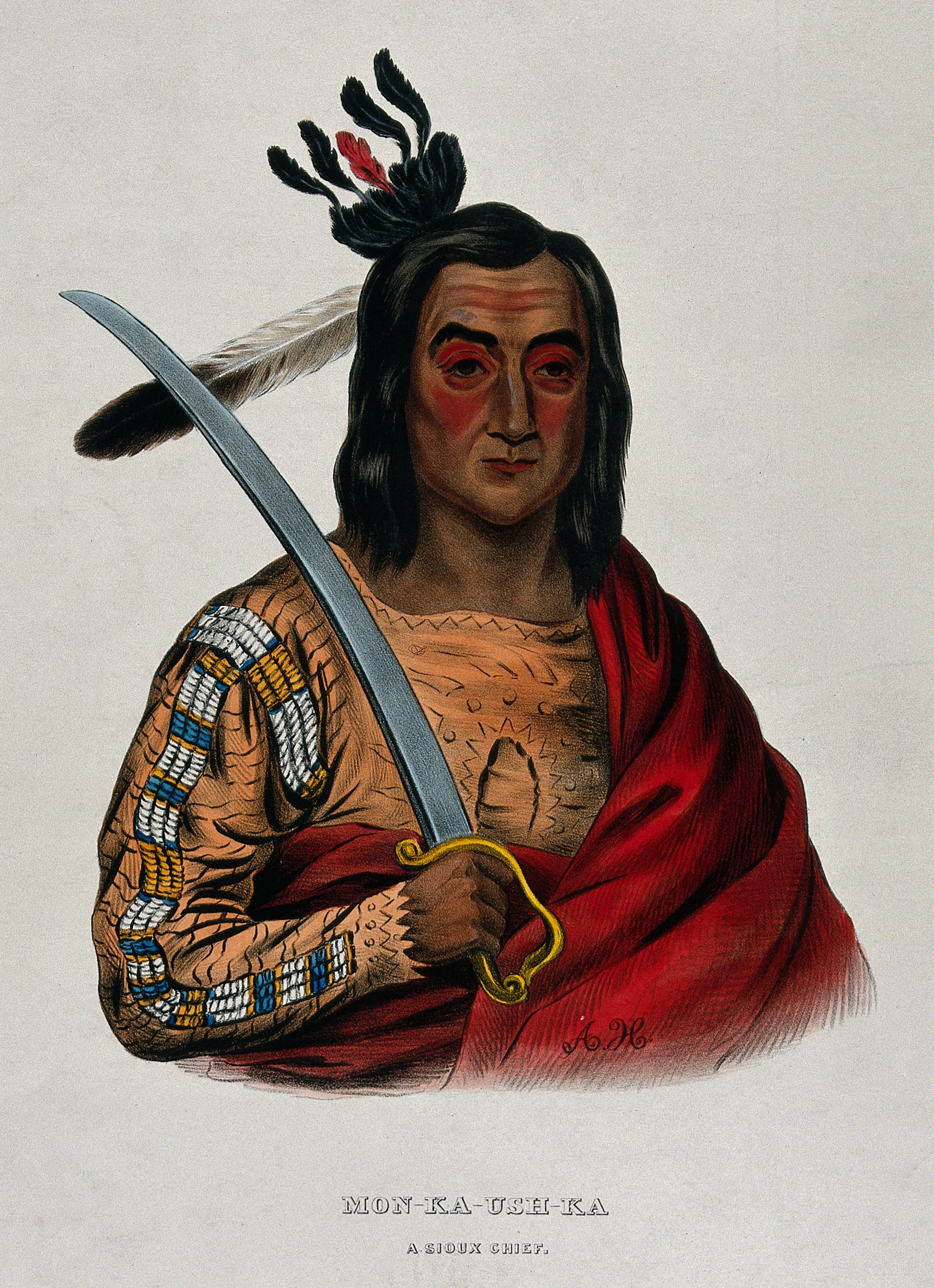
Chief Trembling Earth, painted by Charles Bird King

Trembling Earth (Dakota: Monkaushka; died 1837) was Yankton Dakota chief. He and Wanata led in many encounters with the Iowa and Ojibwa tribes. He also acted as a delegate to Washington, D.C. On October 21, 1837, he and other native leaders signed a treaty selling land to government of the United States. Trembling Earth became ill during his trip, and tried to return to his home, but died en route in Baltimore.
