= Planet Earth (disambiguation) =

The planet Earth is the third planet from the Sun.

Planet Earth may also refer to:

== Film and television ==
- Planet Earth (film), a 1974 science fiction television film
- Planet Earth (1986 TV series), a PBS television documentary series about the geosciences
- Planet Earth franchise of nature documentaries produced by BBC:
  - Planet Earth (2006 TV series), the first television series in the franchise
  - Planet Earth Live, a 2010 BBC nature documentary film

== Music ==
- "Planet Earth", a song by Devo on the 1980 album Freedom of Choice
- "Planet Earth" (Duran Duran song), a 1981 single by Duran Duran
- Planet Earth, a 1997 album by Mother's Army
- "Planet Earth" (Eskimo Joe song), a 2001 single by Eskimo Joe
- Planet Earth (soundtrack), the soundtrack album for the 2006 BBC nature documentary series Planet Earth
- Planet Earth (Prince album), a 2007 album by Prince and the title track of the album
- "Planet Earth", a 2009 spoken word poem by Michael Jackson included on the album This Is It

== See also ==
- Earth (disambiguation)
