= Earth.fm =

Digital platform, audio repository

Earth.fm is a non-profit digital platform, application software, and audio repository that publishes field recordings of natural soundscapes. It was founded in 2022 by Catalin Zorzini. Earth.fm is operated by the Digital Partnership for Regeneration and Reconnection, a European charity, and is fiscally sponsored by the United States-based non-profit, The Biodiversity Group. The organization is an environmental partner of 1% for the Planet, a program through which businesses pledge to donate a portion of their sales to environmental causes.
