= Terran Federation =

Terran Federation may refer to:

- Terran Federation (Starship Troopers)
- Terran Federation (Blake's 7)
- Terran Federation (Starfire)
- Terran Federation in the Terro-Human Future History series in the works by H. Beam Piper

== See also ==
- Terran Confederation (Wing Commander)
- Terran Confederacy (StarCraft)
- Terran Empire (Star Trek)
- Earth Federation (Gundam)
- United Earth Federation (Supreme Commander)
- Galaxy Federation (Xenosaga)
- United Federation of Planets (Star Trek)
