= Whole Earth =

Whole Earth may refer to:

== Publications ==
- Whole Earth Catalog (1968–1972, and afterwards occasionally up to 1988), U.S. life-style and environmental periodical edited by Stewart Brand
- Whole Earth Discipline (published 2009), book by Stewart Brand
- Whole Earth Review (1985–2002, but renamed simply "Whole Earth" after 1997), U.S. scientific and political periodical edited by Stewart Brand
- Whole Earth Software Catalog and Review (1984–1985), two separate U.S. software periodicals (the "Catalog" and the "Review") edited by Stewart Brand

== Other ==
- Whole Earth Access (1969–1998), U.S. counterculture retail store chain created by Stewart Brand
- Whole Earth Blazar Telescope (founded 1997), international consortium of astronomers and astrophysicists
- Whole Earth Foods, a brand of KP Snacks

== See also ==
- Stewart Brand (born 1938), U.S. author, editor, and environmentalist associated with the "whole earth" movement
