= Wolfheart (band) =

Finnish melodic death metal band

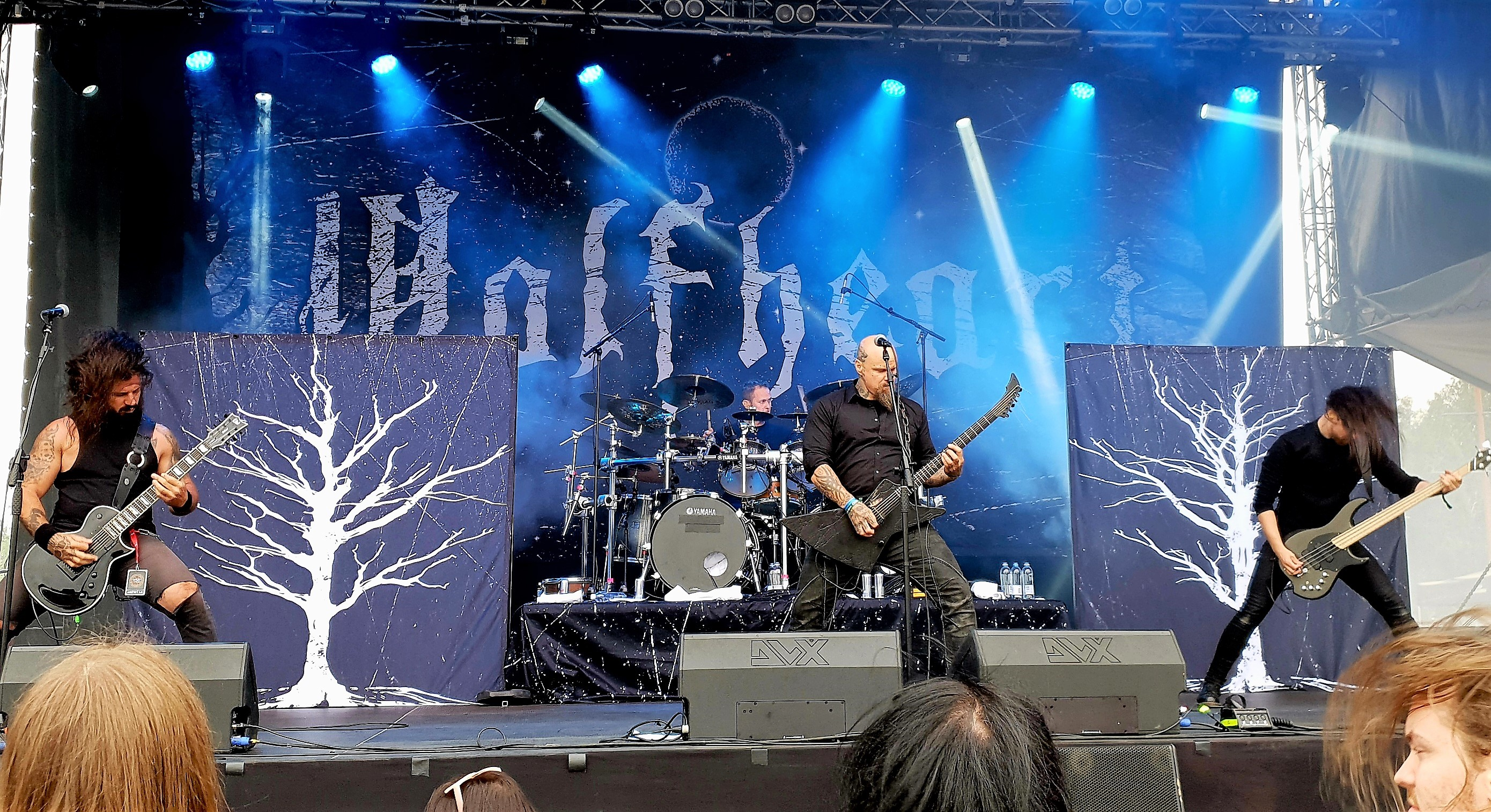
- Wolfheart in 2022

Background information
- Origin: Lahti, Finland
- Genres: Melodic death metal
- Years active: 2013–present
- Labels: Reigning Phoenix; Spinefarm; Napalm
- Members: Tuomas Saukkonen; Lauri Silvonen; Joonas Kauppinen; Vagelis Karzis
- Past members: Esa Uusimaa; Mika Lammassaari

Wolfheart is a Finnish melodic death metal band formed in 2013.

The band's vocalist Tuomas Saukkonen was also the founder and vocalist of the melodic death metal band Before the Dawn.

In 2014, Wolfheart signed a recording contract with Spinefarm Records, before moving to Napalm Records in 2018 and Reigning Phoenix Music in 2023.

They have released seven studio albums, the most recent being Draconian Darkness in 2024.

In November 2024, they became the first European heavy metal band to perform live in Saudi Arabia.

== Members ==
=== Current ===
- Tuomas Saukkonen – bass, drums (2013–2014), vocals, guitar (2013–present)
- Lauri Silvonen – bass, backing vocals (2014–present)
- Joonas Kauppinen – drums (2014–present)
- Vagelis Karzis – guitar, clean vocals (2020–present)

=== Past ===
- Esa Uusimaa – bass (2013–2014)
- Mika Lammassaari – guitar (2014–2019)

== Discography ==
=== Albums ===
- Winterborn (2013)
- Shadow World (2015)
- Tyhjyys (2017)
- Constellation of the Black Light (2018)
- Wolves of Karelia (2020)
- King of the North (2022)
- Draconian Darkness (2024)

=== EPs ===
- Skull Soldiers (2021)
- Draconian Darkness II (2025)

=== Singles ===
- "The Hunt" (2013)
- "Fire and Ice" (2015)
- "Boneyard" (2016)
- "The Flood" (2017)
- "World On Fire" (2017)
- "The Black Light" (2017)
- "Breakwater" (2018)
- "The Saw" (2018)
- "Ashes" (2020)
- "Hail of Steel" (2020)
- "The Hammer" (2020)
- "Ancestor" (2022)
- "Grave" (2024)
- "Burning Sky"(2025)
- "Carnivore" (2025)
