= List of nu metalcore bands =

The following is a list of bands that have played nu metalcore (also known as nu-core), a fusion genre which merges elements of metalcore and nu metal.

== List of bands ==
- Alpha Wolf
- Attila
- Black Coast
- Blood Youth
- Bodyweb
- Butcher Babies
- Cane Hill
- Code Orange
- DangerKids.
- Dealer
- Emmure
- Graphic Nature
- Headwreck
- Hanabie.
- Infected Rain
- In This Moment
- Issues
- Loathe
- Lotus Eater
- My Ticket Home
- Ocean Grove
- Of Mice & Men
- The One Hundred
- Orthodox
- Stray from the Path
- Sworn In
- Sylar
- Thornhill
- Tallah
- Ten56.
- Thrown
- Tetrarch
- Varials
- Vein.fm
- Vended
- Void of Vision
- Within Destruction
