= Cottonmouth (disambiguation) =

Cottonmouth may refer to:

== Vipers ==
- Agkistrodon piscivorus (northern cottonmouth), a semiaquatic pit viper found in the southeastern United States.
- Agkistrodon conanti (Florida cottonmouth), a semiaquatic pit viper found on the Florida peninsula and southern Georgia.

== Medical symptom ==
- Xerostomia, or dry mouth, a medical symptom

== Arts and entertainment ==
=== Fictional characters and elements ===
- Cottonmouth (Cornell Stokes), a supervillain in the Marvel Comics universe
- Cottonmouth (Burchell Clemens), a supervillain in the Marvel Comics universe
- O-Ren Ishii, or Cottonmouth, a character in the film Kill Bill: Volume 1
- Cottonmouth, a character in the 1978 film Convoy
- Cottonmouth, a fictional city and the setting for Manhunt 2

=== Music ===
- "Cotton Mouth", a 1972 song by the Doobie Brothers from Toulouse Street
- "Cottonmouth", a 1996 song by the Melvins from Stag
- "Cottonmouth", a 2007 song by Emanuel from Black Earth Tiger
- "Cottonmouth", a 2008 song by Sam Sparro from Sam Sparro
- "Cottonmouth", a 2015 song by In Hearts Wake from Skydancer
- "Cottonmouth", a 2020 song by Tallah from Matriphagy

=== Television ===
- "Cottonmouth" (Justified), a 2011 episode of Justified

== Technology ==
- COTTONMOUTH, a modified USB cable used for espionage by the National Security Agency
