= Overconfidence (song) =

2020 song by Tallah

Single by Tallah

from the album Matriphagy
- Released: August 20, 2020
- Recorded: <=2020
- Genre: Metalcore; nu-core
- Length: 5:06
- Label: Earache
- Songwriters: Justin Bonitz; Derrick Schneider; Andrew Cooper; Max Portnoy; Mewzen
- Producer: Josh Schroeder

Tallah singles chronology
"Placenta (album ver.)" (2020)	"Overconfidence" (2020)	"L.E.D." (2020)

Music video
- "Overconfidence" on YouTube

"Overconfidence" is a song by American heavy metal band Tallah, released in August 2020 as the fifth of eight singles from their first studio album Matriphagy.

== Background ==
Described by Max Portnoy in an interview as an "upbeat, driving song" containing "weird", "solo-y drum stuff", it covers thematic elements of separating oneself from one's flaws, burdens and insecurities in order to present and embody a true, authentic self.

Despite the music video being filmed at the time of the COVID-19 lockdown period and set in an overbearing, oppressive house environment, Justin Bonitz has noted that this connection is entirely coincidental, and the setting is instead linked to that of the album from which it comes.

== Remixes ==
There are two official remixes of the song published by Earache Records, the first being authored by Teru of Japanese band Crossfaith, released on the 18th of September, two weeks ahead of the album's release. On the remix, Teru states of the song:

"This is a new chaos. I was captivated by how dramatically insane Overconfidence was when I listened to it for the first time. Listen to this song until you will get musically overdosed."

to which the band responded:

"We’re really humbled at how much Crossfaith appreciated our music enough to remix it. They definitely brought their own raw energy into it and gave it some new life. We totally encourage anyone who is into our stuff to have fun with it and make it unique to how it speaks to you."

A second official remix was created by DJ Hyper, known for his work in the Cyberpunk 2077 soundtrack. On this "deconstruction" remix, he states:

"Having bought and loved Earache records since the early days (Godflesh especially), and being inspired by Punk and Metal ever since, it was awesome to work on this Tallah record. I love in particular when Electronic music collides with guitars and this mix felt incredibly natural. Jumping between the tempos and working with their vocal was an exciting dynamic for me artistically. I wanted to see if I could try and reproduce the weight of the original but in my own way and I am more than happy with the outcome!! This is my favourite remix to date!"

== Personnel ==
- Justin Bonitz – lead vocals
- Derrick Schneider – guitars
- Andrew Cooper – bass
- Max Portnoy – drums
- Mewzen – turntables
