= Placenta (disambiguation) =

The placenta is a human organ which provides nutrients to a developing embryo or foetus.

Placenta may also refer to:

== Science ==
=== Biology ===
- Placentation for further information on placental formation
- Placentalia for the infraclass of mammals characterized by developing placentas in pregnancy

== Other uses ==
- Placenta cake, an ancient Roman foodstuff after which the organ was named
- Placenta, a 2018/2020 song by Tallah (No One Should Read This/Matriphagy)

== See also ==
- Placentia (disambiguation)
