= Rust (album) =

Studio album by Harm's Way
- Released: March 10, 2015
- Recorded: October 2014
- Studio: Bricktop Studios (Chicago, Illinois)
- Genre: Metalcore, tough guy hardcore
- Length: 33:50
- Label: Deathwish (DW174)
- Producer: Andy Nelson

Harm's Way chronology
| Blinded (2014) | Rust (2015) | Posthuman (2018) |

Rust is the third studio album by the American hardcore band Harm's Way. Released on March 10, 2015, through Deathwish Inc., Rust—like the preceding EP, Blinded—was produced by Andy Nelson of the powerviolence band Weekend Nachos. The album was sonically influenced by Godflesh, Helmet and Celtic Frost, and Harm's Way promoted its release with a stream for "Law of the Land" and music videos for "Amongst the Rust" and "Left to Disintegrate".

The album received generally positive reviews from music critics. Writing for Rock Sound Chris Hidden gave the album an eight-out-of-ten score, and stated: "This new record finds [Harm's Way] in formidable form, with the likes of 'Amongst The Rust' and 'Cancerous Ways' blending the down-tuned riff attack of nu metal with groove-led thrash and the crushing intensity of hardcore to produce a sound that references everyone from Sepultura to Trapped Under Ice." Writing for SLUG Magazine, Alex Cragun praised the album and said with its, "charging drums and hammering bass, Rust is everything but rust."

== Track listing ==
All songs written and performed by Harm's Way.

1. "Infestation" – 3:24
2. "Law of the Land" – 3:14
3. "Cremation" – 2:44
4. "Hope" – 2:39
5. "Cancerous Ways" – 3:40
6. "Amongst the Rust" – 2:50
7. "Left to Disintegrate" – 4:26
8. "Docile Bodies" – 2:11
9. "Turn to Stone" – 4:22
10. "Ease My Mind" – 4:20

== Personnel ==
Rust personnel adapted from CD liner notes.

=== Harm's Way ===
- Jay Jancetic – guitars, vocals
- Bohan Lueders – guitars, vocals
- Christopher Mills – drums
- James Pligge – vocals

=== Additional musicians ===
- Emily Jancetic – guest vocals on "Turn to Stone"
- Colin Young – guest vocals on "Amongst the Rust"

=== Production and artwork ===
- Kurt Ballou – mixing
- Jacob Bannon – additional design
- Brad Boatright – mastering
- Andy Nelson – engineering
- E. Aaron Ross – photography, design
