= Primeval: Obsession // Detachment =

Studio album by Tallah
- Released: September 5, 2025
- Recorded: September–October, 2024
- Genre: Nu metal; alternative metal; metalcore
- Length: 42:08
- Label: Earache
- Producer: Josh Schroeder; Max Portnoy

Tallah chronology
The Generation of Danger (2022)	Primeval: Obsession // Detachment (2025)

Tallah studio album chronology
The Generation of Danger (2022)	Primeval: Obsession // Detachment (2025)

Singles from Primeval: Obsession // Detachment
- 1. "What We Know" Released: April 2, 2025; 2. "A Primeval Detachment" Released: May 7, 2025; 3. "Augmented" Released: June 11, 2025; 4. "As Fate Undoes" Released: July 15, 2025 (Note: Was available from June 17 for those who had pre-ordered the album.); 5. "Undone by Fate" Released: August 22, 2025

Primeval: Obsession // Detachment is the third studio album by the American heavy metal band Tallah, released on September 5, 2025, through Earache Records. It is the band's first album with Ivan Little on turntables and Joel McDonald on drums, with Max Portnoy officially switching to bass and only performing drums on some songs.

== Background and recording ==
The album is their first with Max Portnoy committing to bass, with former touring drummer Joel McDonald taking over on drums. It is also their first album with DJ Ivan Little. The album was produced by Josh Schroeder, who also produced the band's first two albums. Max Portnoy described the album's recording process and sound, stating:

"For me, this album is Tallah finding our voice...No rules were set...It’s weird. It’s experimental. It’s driving, and energetic. It’s raw. We recorded live, every instrument at the same time, with no click. That’s how we play shows...This album also marks my first recording dedicated to bass. I translated my drum knowledge to a new instrument and it was a huge creative breath of fresh air for me.”

As was the case with the prior two albums, this is a concept album, though comparatively less so. All vocals on the album were performed by Bonitz in a single, continuous take, after Bonitz contracted human immunodeficiency virus, but before being diagnosed formally, resulting in him viewing much of the lyrics as prophetic in hindsight.

== Release ==
On April 2, 2025, Tallah released the song "What We Know" as the album's lead single, accompanied by a music video. On May 7, "A Primeval Detachment" was released as the second single, again with a music video. "Augmented" was released as the third single on June 11, followed by "As Fate Undoes" on July 15, the latter also receiving a music video. The fifth and final single, "Undone by Fate", was released on August 22, 2025. Although not released as a single, the band published a music video for "Depleted" on the album's release day.

Like with the previous album and unlike Matriphagy, an episodic HTML5 browser game was developed to promote the album.

== Composition and themes ==
Musically, Primeval: Obsession // Detachment has been described as a nu metal, alternative metal, metalcore album, that also draws from funk, acoustic, industrial, mathcore, deathcore, and experimental. The album was recorded live with all instruments being recorded simultaneously with no click track. The band's former drummer, Max Portnoy, shifted to bass for the album, with Joel McDonald performing drums on most of the songs. Portnoy utilizes slapped basslines throughout the album, providing a more "funk-laden" sound. Jack Crosby-Griggs of Boolin Tunes compared Portnoy's bass tone and grooves to that of Korn and Mudvayne. Primeval: Obsession // Detachment is a concept album with a sci-fi storyline set in space. Its story follows a nurse named Ana and an assassin named Sheela who are approached by shadowy beings who assign them tasks to test their beliefs and morals. Vocalist Justin Bonitz described it as a "story about morality, duality, and figuring out your place when everything is on the line."

=== Songs ===
The album is separated into two acts, Obsession and Detachment, with each song mirroring a song on the opposite side of the album, like "As Fate Undoes" and "Undone By Fate". The intro track, "05:01", features chanting and transitions into "What We Know", which features various elements of experimentation including, acoustic guitars, a string section, dissonant sound during the chorus, a talk box, and a guitar solo. "Augmented" has been described by the band as a “brutal, groove-heavy offering that throws back to their nu-core roots while flexing the wild experimentation". Portnoy noted that the track features "acoustic guitars and live strings at points...[and] the most intricate bass [lines] in our discography." "As Fate Undoes" utilizes industrial in its intro before switching to "Slipknot-esque poundings" and ends with strings. "My Primeval Obsession" is a more melodic track with Distorted Sound comparing it to Deftones. The track eventually builds up and leads to "guttural screams" from Bonitz. The track introduces a repeating drum kick pattern that transitions into the following two tracks. "_la|cuna_" (Spanish for "_the|cradle_", when partitioned in this way), is a "soulful acoustic interlude" that provides a transition from act one to act two of the album.

"A Primeval Detachment" is the heaviest song on the album, according to the band. Metal Hammer called it "pure mathcore chaos". Much like "My Primeval Obsession", the track "Depleted" has a more "melodic" and "catchy" sound. Similar to "A Primeval Detachment", "Undone By Fate" and "What We Want" focus on the band's heavier side with more of a focus on breakdowns. "What We Want" also features a reprise of the chorus from "What We Know". Closing track "07:09" mirrors the chants from "05:01". The track includes an "eerie instrumental...a return of the vocalizations from ["05:01"]...[and] elements from...throughout [the] record, and leaves...an almost uncomfortable melody."

== Reception ==
Professional ratings
Review scores
Source	Rating
Boolin Tunes	9/10
Distorted Sound	6/10
Metal Hammer	3.5/5 stars

Jack Crosby-Griggs of Boolin Tunes called the album "their most ambitious, experimental and realised thus far." Elliot Leaver of Distorted Sound wrote, "Tallah are clearly still learning their craft, and you cannot fault the effort they put into their music – indeed, there are moments on Primeval: Obsession // Detachment that sparkle brightly. However, that roughness around their edges does need looking at." According to Paul Travers of Metal Hammer, "There's still plenty of Slipknot-style pummelling going on, but Tallah are increasingly spreading their own musical wings. The result is something tantalisingly familiar, but with just enough unpredictability to add a sense of freshness and excitement."

== Track listing ==
All lyrics are written by Justin Bonitz; all music is composed by Max Portnoy and Tallah.

Primeval: Obsession // Detachment track listing
No.	Title	Length
1.	"05:01"	1:04
2.	"What We Know"	4:03
3.	"Augmented"	3:39
4.	"As Fate Undoes"	3:49
5.	"My Primeval Obsession"	4:49
6.	"Lacuna"	3:09
7.	"A Primeval Detachment"	4:29
8.	"Undone By Fate"	5:12
9.	"Depleted"	3:28
10.	"What We Want"	4:36
11.	"07:09"	3:50
Total length:		42:08

- Note: All track titles are stylised in lowercase, besides What We Know and A Primeval Detachment, which are stylized in sentence case. Lacuna is stylized as "_la|cuna_" is Spanish for "_the|cradle_".

== Personnel ==
Tallah

- Justin Bonitz – vocals
- Derrick Schneider – lead guitar, backing vocals
- Alex Snowden – rhythm guitar
- Max Portnoy – bass guitar, drums, production
- Ivan Little – turntables, samples, keyboards
- Joel McDonald – drums

Additional personnel

- Josh Schroeder – production, mixing, mastering, engineering
