= All Smiles (disambiguation) =

All Smiles is the solo project of Jim Fairchild (born 1973), an American guitarist and singer-songwriter.

All Smiles may also refer to:

- All Smiles (Kenny Clarke/Francy Boland Big Band album), 1968
- All Smiles (Sworn In album), 2017
- All Smiles, an upcoming album by A$AP Rocky

== Other uses ==
- All Smiles Dental Centers, a Texas dentistry franchise
