= Help! (Sylar album) =

Studio album by Sylar
- Released: August 26, 2016
- Genre: Nu metalcore; rap metal
- Length: 43:35
- Label: Hopeless
- Producer: Erik Ron

Sylar chronology
To Whom It May Concern (2014)	Help! (2016)	Seasons (2018)

Singles from Help!
- 1. "Assume" Released: June 7, 2016; 2. "Dark Daze" Released: August 3, 2016; 3. "Soul Addiction (Radio Edit)" Released: February 10, 2017

Professional ratings
Review scores
Source	Rating
New-Transcendence	10/10 stars
Cryptic Rock	4.5/5 stars
CaliberTV.net	9.4/10

Help! is the second studio album by American nu metal band Sylar. It was released on August 26, 2016 through Hopeless Records. The first single "Assume" was released on June 7, 2016 along with the pre-order for the album. This record was the last release to feature founding member Thomas Veroutis on drums before his departure in 2017.

== Track listing ==
No.	Title	Length
1.	"Help!"	3:58
2.	"Soul Addiction"	3:29
3.	"Assume"	3:22
4.	"Me, Myself, & I"	4:08
5.	"Doubting Out"	4:01
6.	"Dark Daze"	4:11
7.	"South Street Lullaby"	3:46
8.	"I Know, You Know, I Know"	4:34
9.	"Gambit Rogue Delight"	3:32
10.	"Pleasure Paradise"	3:18
11.	"Maintain Closure"	5:11
Total length:		43:35

== Personnel ==
Sylar

- Jayden Panesso – lead vocals
- Miguel Cardona – rhythm guitar, clean vocals
- Dustin Jennings – lead guitar
- Travis Hufton – bass
- Thomas Veroutis - drums

Production

- Erik Ron – production, recording, mixing, mastering

== Charts ==
Chart (2016)	Peak position
US Top Rock Albums (Billboard)	31
US Top Hard Rock Albums (Billboard)	11
US Top Alternative Albums (Billboard)	25
US Heatseekers Albums (Billboard)	8
US Independent Albums (Billboard)	25
