= Weekend Nachos =

American powerviolence band

- Origin: DeKalb, Illinois, U.S.
- Genres: Powerviolence, hardcore punk, sludge metal
- Years active: 2004–2017, 2023–present
- Labels: Relapse; Cowabunga; Tooth Decay; Force Fed; A389; Deep Six; Regurgitated Semen; Run for Cover; Drugged Conscience
- Members: Andy Nelson; Brian Laude; Drew Brown; John Hoffman
- Past members: E. Aaron Ross; Adam Tomlinson; Ronald Petzke; Varg (Chris) Campos
- Website: www.facebook.com/weekendxnachos

Weekend Nachos is an American powerviolence band from DeKalb, Illinois.

== History ==
Weekend Nachos began in 2004, after releasing a collection of demos that they had recorded. The band released their debut EP Torture the following year via Tooth Decay Records. In 2006, the band recorded and released a split album with the band Chronic Bleeding Syndrome via Force Fed Records. In 2007, the band released their debut full-length album titled Punish and Destroy via Cowabunga Records. They released their second full-length album, titled Unforgivable, in 2009 via Relapse Records. The band released a third full-length album, titled Worthless, in 2011 via Relapse Records. The band then released a 12-inch EP titled Bleed via Relapse Records. Also in 2011, the band released a 7-inch EP titled Black Earth via A389 recordings. In early 2012, the band played at the A389 Bash music festival, an annual event organized by Pulling Teeth guitarist Domenic Romeo. The band released a split EP with Lack of Interest that same year via Deep Six Records. In 2013, the band released their fourth full-length album, titled Still via Relapse Records.

On January 1, 2016, Weekend Nachos announced via Facebook that they would be retiring as a band. The band simultaneously announced various tour dates, as well as the title of their fifth and final album, "Apology.", to be released in May 2016, via Relapse Records, Cosmic Note and Deep Six Records.

Weekend Nachos played their last show on January 14, 2017, at Subterranean in Chicago, IL. The band reunited on November 18, 2023, at The Metro in Chicago, opening for Harm's Way on the Common Suffering record release show along with All Out War, Fleshwater, Ingrown and Jivebomb. This came along with additional reunion shows for 2024.

== Discography ==
Studio albums

- Punish and Destroy (2007, Cowabunga Records)
- Unforgivable (2009, Relapse Records)
- Worthless (2011, Relapse Records)
- Still (2013, Relapse Records)
- Apology (2016, Relapse Records)

EPs, demos and splits

- Demo #1 (2004)
- Torture (2005, Tooth Decay Records)
- Weekend Nachos / Chronic Bleeding Syndrome – It's a Wonderful Life (2006, Force Fed Records)
- Bleed (2010, Relapse Records)
- Black Earth (2011, A389 Recordings)
- Weekend Nachos / Lack of Interest (2012, Deep Six Records)
- Watch You Suffer (2012, A389 Recordings)
- Weekend Nachos / Wojczech – Live At Fluff Fest (2014, Regurgitated Semen Records)
- Weezer Nachos (2015, Run For Cover Records)

Compilations

- Two Things at Once (2011, Cowabunga Records)

Miscellaneous

- Untitled (2008, Drugged Conscience Records)
- Punish and Destroy / Torture (2008, Regurgitated Semen Records)
- High Pressure (2015, Blast For Humanity Records)
