= The Generation of Danger =

Studio album by Tallah
- Released: November 18, 2022
- Recorded: June–August 2021
- Genre: Nu metal; metalcore; rap metal; deathcore
- Length: 57:48
- Label: Earache
- Producer: Josh Schroeder

Tallah chronology
Talladdin (2021)	The Generation of Danger (2022)	Primeval: Obsession // Detachment (2025)

Tallah studio album chronology
Matriphagy (2020)	The Generation of Danger (2022)	Primeval: Obsession // Detachment (2025)

Singles from The Generation of Danger
- 1. "Telescope" Released: March 9, 2022; 2. "The Impressionist" Released: April 19, 2022; 3. "Shaken (Not Stirred)" Released: September 1, 2022; 4. "For the Recognition" Released: October 13, 2022; 5. "Dicker's Done" Released: November 10, 2022

The Generation of Danger is the second studio album by the American heavy metal band Tallah. It was preceded by five singles: "Telescope", "The Impressionist", "Shaken (Not Stirred)", "For the Recognition", and "Dicker's Done".

== Concept ==
Much like Matriphagy, The Generation of Danger is a concept album. Lead vocalist Justin Bonitz has firmly stated that the storylines of each album are entirely distinct from each other, with similarities and references in said albums only existing as Easter eggs and having no deeper connection.

The story focuses on a mad scientist who works on behalf of a large corporation. He becomes increasingly frustrated due to his revolutionary inventions and discoveries being credited to the company rather than himself, eventually leading him to force the company to take part in "the greatest experiment the world of science has ever seen". Metaphorically, the storyline deals with "people hiding what they truly desire until someone else comes along and forces it to surface".

== Release ==
On March 9, 2022, they released the single and music video "Telescope", and announced the title of the album, The Generation of Danger, along with the original release date of September 9, 2022. The band supported All That Remains on their spring 2022 US tour that began on March 12, 2022, in Worcester, Massachusetts. On April 19, 2022, they released the second single off the album, "The Impressionist" with a music video. In August 2022, they announced that the album's release would be pushed back to November 18. On September 1, 2022, they released "Shaken (Not Stirred)" as a single with a music video. On October 13, 2022, they released the single "For the Recognition" with a music video. On November 10, 2022, they released the fifth and final single "Dicker's Done". The album was released on November 18, 2022.

The initial announcement of the album was paired with the release of a promotional browser game bearing the album's title.

== Composition ==
The Generation of Danger has been described as nu metal, metalcore, rap metal, and deathcore. According to Max Morin of Metal Injection, vocalist Justin Bonitz's goes from "jibbering like a maniac, spitting rap bars, shredding his throat with pig squeals or finding his inner arena rock frontman, he might be the most unpredictable member of the band." Eli Enis of Revolver stated, "Over 13 songs, the band explore a ferocious fusion of early Slipknot intensity — spitfire vocals...and modern hardcore savagery à la Vein.fm and Knocked Loose." Metal Injection also noted influences from bands like Code Orange and Knocked Loose. According to Eli Enis of Revolver, The Generation of Danger is a "sci-fi [concept album] about a crazed genius, featuring nine different characters that [vocalist Justin Bonitz] portrays with a variety of unique vocals." In describing the album's sound, Sputnikmusic wrote, "[the album] takes the groove and bounce of nu-metal, turntables and all, merged with chaotic heavy elements that you’d normally see in deathcore, complemented by drums that sound like St. Anger but good...guitars as sharp as a fucking vorpal blade, and a vocalist who seems to have made it his mission to be as chaotic and insane sounding as [possible]."

== Reception ==
Professional ratings
Review scores
Source	Rating
Distorted Sound	9/10
Metal Injection	8/10
Sputnikmusic	4.5/5
Wall of Sound	8/10

Dan McHugh of Distorted Sound Mag wrote, "Tallah have expertly set themselves apart with ingenious levels of creativity that will astound...Thirteen songs of this sheer brute force may be a bit exhausting for some but the execution is undeniably impressive." Max Morin of Metal Injection wrote "Any fan of the last twenty years of metal should find something to like about The Generation of Danger. Tallah is about as subtle as a bunch of cavemen beating a drum kit with rocks, but they're so dedicated to the chaos that it's admirable." Sputnikmusic called the album a "chaotic mish-mash of styles is the most refreshing breath of fresh air I’ve ever seen in music, a landmark moment both for metalcore and for nu-metal." Simon Valentine of Wall of Sound called it "a frenetic album that both salutes the old guard but offers up their signature sound as the new normal."

== Track listing ==
All lyrics are written by Justin Bonitz; all music is composed by Max Portnoy, unspecified tracks co-composed by Derrick Schneider.

The Generation of Danger track listing
No.	Title	Length
1.	"mud_castle"	2:24
2.	"The Hard Reset"	4:35
3.	"Stomping Grounds"	4:29
4.	"The Impressionist"	4:28
5.	"Shaken (Not Stirred)"	5:19
6.	"For the Recognition"	4:02
7.	"Of Nothing"	4:02
8.	"Dicker's Done"	5:19
9.	"Telescope"	4:09
10.	"Wendrid"	5:56
11.	"Headfirst"	4:03
12.	"Thistle"	5:31
13.	"How Long?"	3:31
Total length:		57:48

== Personnel ==
Tallah

- Justin Bonitz – vocals
- Derrick Schneider – lead guitar, backing vocals, bass guitar
- Alizé "Mewzen" Rodriguez – turntables, samples, keyboards
- Alex Snowden – rhythm guitar
- Max Portnoy – drums, percussion, bass guitar

Additional personnel

- Josh Schroeder – production, mixing, mastering, engineering
- Andrew Cooper – bass guitar
