= This World Is Going to Ruin You =

2022 studio album by Vein.fm

Studio album by Vein.fm
- Released: March 4, 2022
- Recorded: April 2020
- Studio: Graphic Nature Audio, Belleville, New Jersey
- Genre: Metalcore; hardcore punk; nu metal; industrial hardcore
- Length: 32:06
- Label: Closed Casket Activities; Nuclear Blast
- Producer: Will Putney

Vein.fm chronology
Errorzone (2018)	This World Is Going to Ruin You (2022)

Singles from This World Is Going to Ruin You
- 1. "The Killing Womb" Released: January 5, 2022; 2. "Fear In Non Fiction" Released: January 25, 2022; 3. "Wavery" Released: February 15, 2022

This World Is Going to Ruin You is the second studio album by American metalcore band Vein.fm (formerly Vein), which was released on March 4, 2022, through Closed Casket Activities and Nuclear Blast. It was recorded in April 2020, shortly after the start of the COVID-19 lockdowns. The album was produced in the Graphic Nature Audio studio by Will Putney of Fit for an Autopsy.

== Release ==
The band released the lead single from the album, "The Killing Womb", on January 5, 2022, and announced that the album would be released later on March 4, 2022. On January 25, 2022, the band released the second single "Fear in Non Fiction". The album's final single, "Wavery" was released on February 15, 2022.

== Reception ==
Professional ratings
Review scores
Source	Rating
The Alternative	4/5 stars
Blabbermouth	8.5/10
Distorted Sound	9/10
Kerrang!	4/5 stars
Pitchfork	7.4/10
Wall of Sound	8.5/10

The album has received generally positive reviews, with Kerrang! calling it "a startlingly ambitious piece of work from a truly iconoclastic band." Vocalist Anthony DiDio said of the album, "This record is Vein.fm coming home."

== Musical style ==
Gabe La Torre of No Echo said that the album was thrilling in its unpredictability, while Jack Terry of Distorted Sound Magazine called the album "the aural equivalent of a psychological slasher horror", and also compares some aspects of the album to Slipknot, thanks to the turntables done by Benno Levine.

== Track listing ==
No.	Title	Length
1.	"Welcome Home"	1:18
2.	"The Killing Womb"	2:32
3.	"Versus Wyoming"	0:55
4.	"Fear in Non Fiction" (featuring Geoff Rickly)	3:24
5.	"Lights Out"	1:31
6.	"Wherever You Are"	2:11
7.	"Magazine Beach"	1:27
8.	"Inside Design"	1:06
9.	"Hellnight" (featuring Jeromes Dream)	2:30
10.	"Orgy in the Morgue" (featuring Bones)	3:20
11.	"Wavery"	4:41
12.	"Funeral Sound"	7:17
Total length:		32:06

== Personnel ==
Vein.fm

- Anthony DiDio – vocals
- Matt Wood – drums
- Jeremy Martin – guitar, vocals
- Jon Lhaubouet – bass
- Benno Levine – turntables

Production

- Will Putney – production, engineering, mixing, mastering

Additional personnel

- Elmo O'Connor (BONES) – guest vocals on "Orgy in the Morgue"
- Autumn Morgan – artwork
- Geoff Rickly (Thursday) – guest vocals on "Fear in Non Fiction"
- Steve Said – engineer
- Jeff Smith (Jeromes Dream) – guest vocals on "Hellnight"
- Randy LeBoeuf – piano
