= Seasons (Sylar album) =

Studio album by Sylar
- Released: October 5, 2018
- Recorded: 2018
- Genre: Nu metal; rap metal
- Length: 37:02
- Label: Hopeless
- Producer: Erik Ron

Sylar chronology
Help! (2016)	Seasons (2018)

Singles from Seasons
- 1. "All or Nothing" Released: August 7, 2018; 2. "No Way" Released: August 21, 2018; 3. "Open Wounds" Released: October 3, 2018

Professional ratings
Review scores
Source	Rating
The Front Row Report	9/10 stars
Dead Press	8/10 stars
Distorted Sound	8/10 stars
Kill Your Stereo	65/100
New Fury Media	(positive)
The Soundboard Reviews	4/10 stars
Already Heard	2/5 stars
Broken Arrow Magazine	8/10 stars

Seasons is the third studio album by American nu metal band Sylar. It was released on October 5, 2018 through Hopeless Records. The first single "All or Nothing" was released on August 7, 2018 along with the pre-order for the album.

== Track listing ==
No.	Title	Length
1.	"Seasons"	3:43
2.	"All or Nothing"	3:18
3.	"No Way"	3:51
4.	"Wait for You"	2:41
5.	"SHOOK!"	3:28
6.	"Winter" (Interlude)	1:36
7.	"Open Wounds"	3:44
8.	"Giving Up"	3:51
9.	"sickminded"	3:29
10.	"Same Dance"	3:31
11.	"Doubt Me"	3:50
Total length:		37:02

== Personnel ==
Sylar

- Jayden Panesso – lead vocals
- Miguel Cardona – rhythm guitar, clean vocals
- Dustin Jennings – lead guitar
- Travis Hufton – bass
- Cody Ash – drums, percussion

Production

- Erik Ron – production, recording, mixing, mastering

== Charts ==
Chart (2018)	Peak position
US Heatseekers Albums (Billboard)	8
US Independent Albums (Billboard)	31
