= To Create a Cure =

Studio album by My Ticket Home
- Released: January 21, 2012
- Recorded: 2011
- Genres: Metalcore; post-hardcore
- Length: 34:55
- Label: Rise
- Producers: Caleb Shomo; My Ticket Home

My Ticket Home chronology
The Opportunity to Be (2010)	To Create a Cure (2012)	Strangers Only (2013)

Singles from To Create a Cure
- 1. "A New Breed" Released: December 10, 2012

Professional ratings
Review scores
Source	Rating
Dead Press	6/10

To Create a Cure is the debut studio album by American heavy metal band My Ticket Home. It was released on January 21, 2012, through Rise Records. It is the last to feature Luke Fletcher on bass and Sean Mackowski on guitar and vocals.

== Track listing ==
No.	Title	Length
1.	"A New Breed"	3:03
2.	"Who Is 67?"	2:57
3.	"Atlas"	3:09
4.	"The Truth Changes If We Both Lie"	4:24
5.	"Beyond"	2:29
6.	"Motion Sickness"	2:09
7.	"A Thief of One, a Thief of Many"	4:01
8.	"Awake:Create"	3:30
9.	"The Dream Code"	3:15
10.	"Dark Days"	2:41
11.	"Fear Complex"	3:15
Total length:		34:55

== Personnel ==
My Ticket Home

- Nick Giumenti – unclean vocals, lead vocals (5, 6, 10)
- Sean Mackowski – guitars, clean vocals, lead vocals (3, 4, 9)
- Matt Gallucci – guitars
- Luke Fletcher - bass
- Marshal Giumenti – drums

Production

- Caleb Shomo – production, mixing, keyboards, programming
- My Ticket Home – production
