= Above the Great City =

EP by My Ticket Home
- Released: May 23, 2009
- Recorded: 2009 @ Paper Tiger Studios
- Genres: Metalcore; Post-hardcore
- Length: 21:16
- Label: Independent
- Producer: Bobby Leonard

My Ticket Home chronology
Above the Great City (2009)	The Opportunity To Be (2010)

Above the Great City is the debut EP by American metal band My Ticket Home. It was released independently on May 23, 2009.

== Track listing ==
No.	Title	Length
1.	"I'll See You on the Island"	2:59
2.	"Barack, Paper, Scissors"	3:31
3.	"It's High Time for Low Morale"	3:39
4.	"The Best Dancer Carries a Six-Shooter"	3:52
5.	"What Went Wrong, Blundo?"	4:41
6.	"How to Fight a Losing Battle"	2:34
Total length:		21:16

== Personnel ==
My Ticket Home

- Nick Giumenti – unclean vocals
- Nick Salemi – keyboards, clean vocals, additional unclean vocals
- Sean Mackowski – guitars
- Matt Seidel – guitars
- Luke Fletcher - bass
- Marshal Giumenti – drums

Production

- Bobby Leonard – production, engineered, mastering, mixing
