= UnReal (My Ticket Home album) =

Studio album by My Ticket Home
- Released: October 6, 2017
- Recorded: 2017
- Studio: Sonic Ranch Studios
- Genre: Alternative metal; grunge; nu metal; alternative rock
- Length: 39:59
- Label: Spinefarm
- Producer: Fred Archambault

My Ticket Home chronology
Strangers Only (2013)	UnReal (2017)	Pure to a Fault (2025)

Singles from UnReal
- 1. "Thrush" Released: August 18, 2017; 2. "Hyperreal" Released: September 19, 2017; 3. "We All Use" Released: September 21, 2017; 4. "Flypaper" Released: September 29, 2017

Professional ratings
Review scores
Source	Rating
New Noise Magazine	4/5 stars
Rock Sins	7.5/10 stars
Louder Sound	3/5 stars
KillYourStereo.com	5.5/10 stars
Already Heard	3/5 stars
The Soundboard Reviews	5/10 stars

UnReal (styled unReal) is the third studio album by American heavy metal band My Ticket Home. It was released on October 6, 2017, through Spinefarm. It is the band's first release with Spinefarm, as well as the band's first album since 2013's Strangers Only.

The album's sound was influenced by Oasis, Incubus, Deftones and Nirvana.

== Track listing ==
All tracks are written by My Ticket Home.

No.	Title	Length
1.	"Thrush"	3:24
2.	"Flee the Flesh"	3:21
3.	"Flypaper"	2:57
4.	"Time Kills Everything"	3:21
5.	"Hyperreal"	3:03
6.	"Redline"	2:22
7.	"Joi"	3:22
8.	"Gasoline Kiss"	2:38
9.	"Cellophane"	2:43
10.	"Down Life"	2:50
11.	"We All Use"	3:01
12.	"Melancholia"	3:33
13.	"Visual Snow"	3:24
Total length:		39:59

== Personnel ==
Credits are adapted from the album's liner notes.

My Ticket Home

- Nick Giumenti – lead vocals, bass guitar
- Derek Blevins – rhythm guitar, vocals
- Matt Gallucci – lead guitar
- Marshal Giumenti – drums

Additional musicians

- Amy Archambault – spoken word vocals on "Time Kills Everything"

Production

- Fred Archambault – production, recording, mixing
- Gerardo "Jerry" Ordonez – recording, programming
- Nick Giumenti – mixing
- Jarred Bigelow – editing
- Gendry Studer – mastering
- Charles Godfrey – drum tech
