= The Death Card =

Studio album by Sworn In
- Released: August 20, 2013
- Genre: Nu metalcore
- Length: 39:06
- Label: Razor & Tie
- Producer: Brian Hood

Sworn In chronology
Start/End (2012)	The Death Card (2013)	The Lovers/The Devil (2015)

Professional ratings
Review scores
Source	Rating
Blabbermouth.net	7/10

The Death Card is the debut album from American metalcore band Sworn In. It was released by Razor & Tie Recordings on 20 August 2013.

The record's release was preceded by a video for the first single, "Snake Eyes."

== Critical reception ==
AllMusic called the album "characterized by bleak lyrics, screamy vocals, and a straightforward musical backdrop of by-the-book metal-influenced hardcore."

== Track listing ==
All music is composed by Chris George.

No.	Title	Length
1.	"XIII"	1:17
2.	"Hypocrisy"	4:16
3.	"Mindless"	3:58
4.	"Dead Soul"	3:26
5.	"Senseless"	0:26
6.	"A Song for the Nameless"	3:47
7.	"Snake Eyes"	3:31
8.	"Deadpan"	3:44
9.	"Mute"	1:56
10.	"Three Cheers"	4:10
11.	"Bitter Blood"	1:43
12.	"Death"	3:39
13.	"Return (Heartless)"	3:14
Total length:		39:06

== Personnel ==
Sworn In

- Tyler Dennen – vocals
- Eugene Kamlyuk – guitar
- Zakary Gibson – guitar
- Sean Banks – bass
- Chris George – drums

Additional

- Forefathers – album Art

== Charts ==
Album

Year	Chart	Position
2013	U.S. Billboard Top 200	184
2013	Top Heatseekers Albums	7
2013	Top Hard Rock Albums	16
2013	Top Independent Albums	39
2013	Next Big Sound	10
