= Nu metalcore =

Music genre

- Other names: Nu-core
- Stylistic origins: Nu metal; metalcore
- Cultural origins: 2000s–2010s, United States, United Kingdom and Australia
- Typical instruments: Electric guitar; bass guitar; drums; turntable; synthesizer; vocals

Other topics
- List of nu metalcore bands; rapcore; beatdown hardcore; deathcore; electronicore

Nu metalcore (or nu-core) is a fusion genre that combines elements of nu metal and metalcore. The genre often makes use of a combination of screamed and sung vocals, in addition to breakdowns, hip hop-influenced drum beats and electronic music elements.

During the 1990s, many nu metal groups took influence from the hardcore scene, and metalcore bands including Integrity, Norma Jean and Bury Your Dead embraced elements of nu metal at varying points in their careers. In the late 2000, some deathcore bands (a subgenre of metalcore) like Suicide Silence, Emmure and Whitechapel began taking influence from nu metal as well. This led to the first wave of nu metalcore in the 2010s. In 2013, genre defining works such as Bring Me the Horizon's Sempiternal, My Ticket Home's Strangers Only and Sworn In's the Death Card were released. By 2016, the formations of Cane Hill, Ocean Grove and Issues had led to a solidified first wave. A second strain of the genre, originating from the hardcore scene, soon emerged with Code Orange's Forever (2017), Vein.fm's Errorzone (2018) and Harm's Way's Posthuman (2018). In the 2020s, the genre continued to gain traction, with a new wave of groups including Loathe, Tetrarch and Tallah.

== Characteristics ==
Nu metalcore often makes use of both screamed and sung vocals, breakdowns, heavy guitar riffs, hip hop-influenced drum beats and electronic music elements. Loudwire described the style as mostly based around nu metal and hip hop, while also incorporating the breakdowns of hardcore punk and the guitar tones of djent. Metal Injection writer Max Heilman specifically stated the style of metalcore that nu metalcore bands draw on is the original 1990s "metallic hardcore" style. An editorial for Thrash Hits cited Contemporary R&B as a key influence on the genre, comparing it to the influence hip hop had on the original nu metal genre.

== History ==
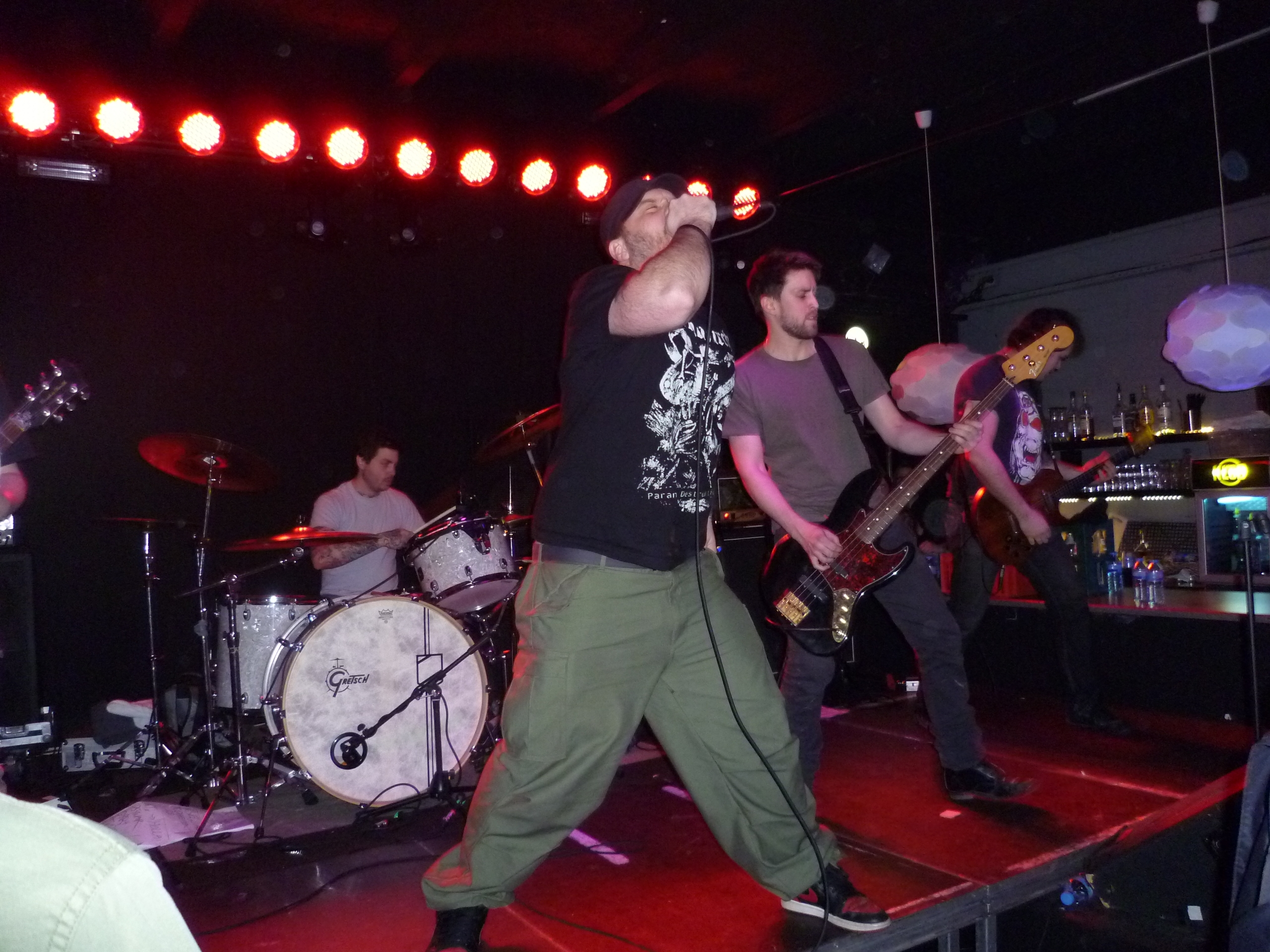
Metalcore pioneers Integrity embraced nu metal influences on their 1999 album Integrity 2000

=== Precursors ===
Since its pioneering, nu metal had been influenced by hardcore, particularly beatdown hardcore and its ignorant take on heavy riffing. Vision of Disorder's 1996 self-titled debut was noted in a 2011 MetalSucks article, by Finn McKenty, to blend nu metal with "Victory-style hardcore". Pioneering metalcore band Integrity's fifth album Integrity 2000 (1999) saw the band collaborate with members of nu metal band Mushroomhead. The same year, Chimaira released the This Present Darkness EP, which merged elements of nu metal and metalcore, a trend that would be continued on their debut album Pass Out of Existence (2001). Pioneering metalcore band Earth Crisis released the nu metal album Slither (2000). Slipknot's 2001 nu metal album Iowa contained elements of late 1990s metalcore, being compared by PopMatters writer Ethan Stewart to Disembodied. Influential metalcore band Norma Jean formed in 1997 playing nu metal under the name Luti-Kriss, before transitioning into metalcore with the release of Bless the Martyr and Kiss the Child (2002). Japanese band Dir En Grey, formed in 1997, making music which Metal Hammer writer Alec Chillingworth referred to as "cutting edge, genuinely innovative music, taking influence from every pocket of the genre whether it be extreme metal, metalcore or nu metal." Bury Your Dead's 2006 album Beauty and the Breakdown described by AllMusic as "straight-ahead, knotty, scorched earth nu-metal" while keeping "the ferocity of Bury Your Dead's hard-and-metalcore attack". Other early bands to merge elements of both genres included Ill Nino, Demon Hunter and Maximum the Hormone. As early as 2007, Lambgoat.com writer Rob Parker used the term "nu metalcore" to refer to the sound of Demon Hunter.

=== Origins ===
In the mid-to-late 2000s, many deathcore groups began to embrace elements of nu metal, with Whitechapel and Suicide Silence making use of a "heavier and more groove-driven sound than their predecessors and increasingly bordered nu-metal", and Emmure, Winds of Plague and the Acacia Strain embracing its urban, aesthetics. As early as 2011, publications including MetalSucks had begun to use the term "nu-deathcore" or "nu-dethcore" to refer to a wave of bands combining nu metal and deathcore, including Emmure, Suicide Silence, Here Comes the Kraken, Upon a Burning Body and Gorelord. Suicide Silence's 2011 album The Black Crown, which features elements of nu metal and metalcore/deathcore, peaked at number 28 on the Billboard 200 chart. This wave led Japanese band Dir En Grey to return to their nu metal influence sound while also embracing deathcore on songs such as "Different Sense".

These nu deathcore bands, led to a popularisation of nu metal elements in metalcore beginning around 2010, when Infected Rain, In This Moment, Butcher Babies and Attila began creating a "proto nu metalcore" sound. Metalcore band Bring Me the Horizon's 2013 album Sempiternal embraced elements of nu metal and was widely influential. It peaked at number 3 on the UK albums chart, and was one of the earliest releases by a UK metalcore band on a major label, through RCA Records.

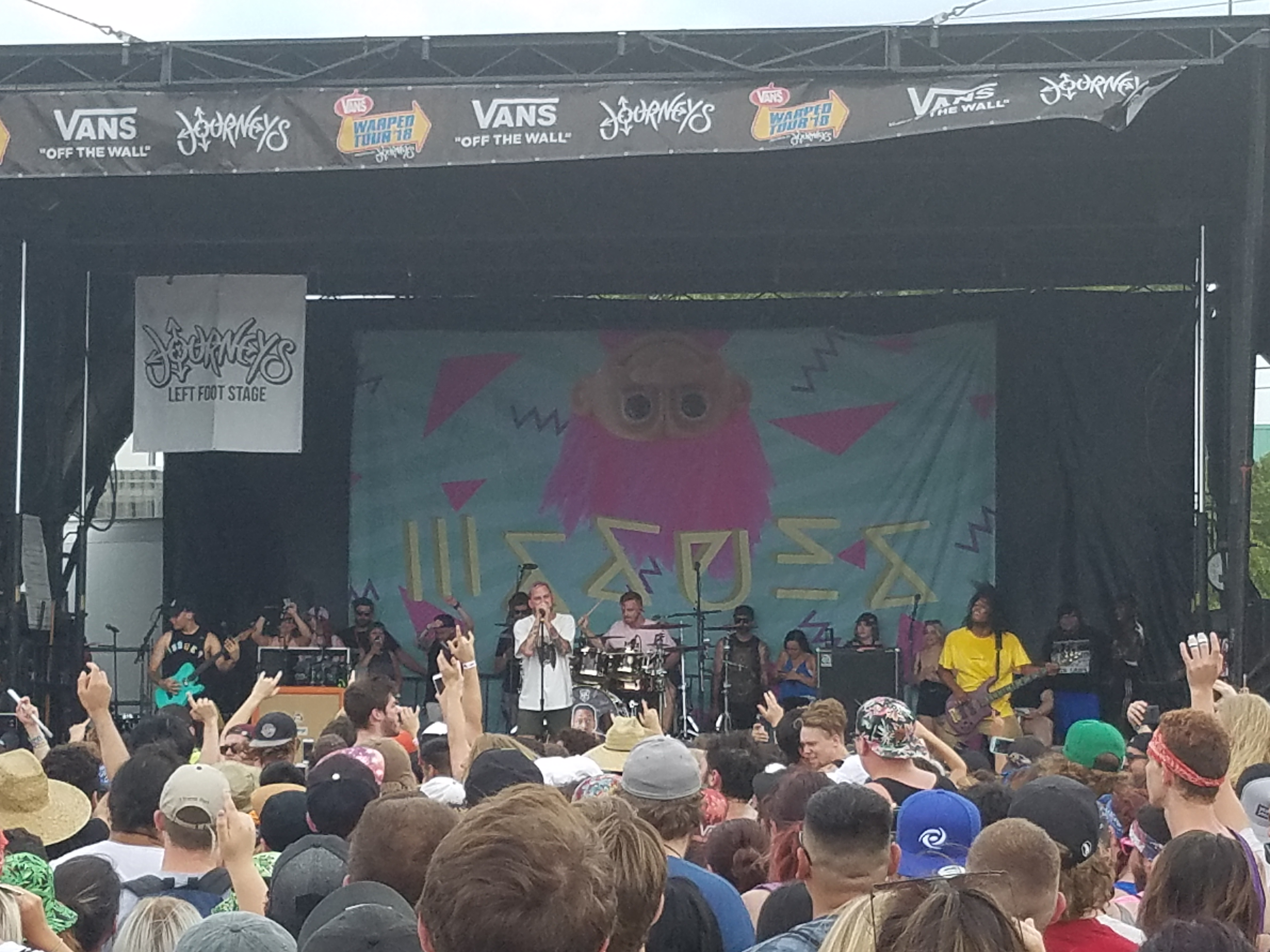
Issues' merger of nu metalcore and contemporary R&B saw widespread commercial success

My Ticket Home's Strangers Only (2013) were a notable precedent of the 2010s nu metalcore wave, seeing a previously established metalcore act merge their style with dark, nu metal influence, together with Sworn In, they were one of the first to establish the modern nu metalcore sound. Issues' merger of nu metal, metalcore and contemporary R&B gained them significant commercial success, with a number of publications crediting them as ushering a new wave of nu metal. Their debut self-titled album (2014) peaked at peaked at number nine on the Billboard 200 chart and their second album Headspace (2016) reached number one on the Top Alternative Albums chart. Furthermore, Bring Me the Horizon's fifth album That's the Spirit (2015) saw the band fully embrace nu metal, which peaked at number 2 in both the UK and US.

=== Development ===
By 2016, nu metalcore had solidified itself as a movement, when the fusion began to be embraced by Cane Hill, Ocean Grove, Alpha Wolf and DangerKids. According to The Soundboard in 2016, "nu-metalcore has become [...] omnipresent." Many bands who had already made a name for themselves playing metalcore began to shift their sound towards nu metalcore, including Parkway Drive on Atlas (2012), Of Mice & Men on Restoring Force (2014) and Cold World (2016) and Northlane on Alien (2019).

Metalcore band Code Orange saw critical acclaim and success with their Roadrunner Records debut Forever in 2017. It saw the band embraced the influence of nu metal, and according to PopMatters writer Ethan Stewart, led to nu metalcore becoming "one of the most prominent flavors of contemporary metal". Forever's title track was also nominated Grammy for Best Metal Performance in 2018. Because of its influence, many metallic hardcore bands began incorporating nu metal and industrial into the sound, leading to the releases of the White Noise's AM/PM (2017), Vein.fm's Errorzone (2018) and Harm's Way's Posthuman (2018).

In 2020, Metal Hammer published an article titled "The most exciting new sound of 2020 is... nu metal", citing Loathe, Blood Youth, Tetrarch, Ocean Grove and Tallah as the bands fronting the newest wave of nu metalcore. Loathe's second album I Let It in and It Took Everything (2020) saw critical acclaim, and was consistently praised for expanding the scope of metalcore by incorporating elements of nu metal, shoegaze, emo, post-rock, progressive metal and industrial music. The band's use of the Fender Bass VI guitar, which tunes to an octave below a standard tuning guitar, became widely sought after following the album's release. The same year, Alternative Press additionally cited Sylar and Void of Vision as "essential nü-metal metalcore bands".

In the 2020s, some nu metalcore bands developed the label "pissed-core" in reference to their emphasis on aggression. This sound had roots in downtempo deathcore, with Blunt Magazine calling it a "a very angsty form of deathcore". Pissedcore incorporated influences from contemporary styles of hip hop and put a greater emphasis on hardcore punk influence than was common in the genre. Oor writer Roel Peijs called it "a sort of hybrid of hardcore, nu-metal, and hip-hop, steeped in frustration and social media rage". Amped Magazine noted elements of beatdown hardcore. It sometimes makes of trap music beats and simple, downtuned power chord grooves. According to Brothers In RAW, Thrown are often called the "poster boys for pissed core". In a 2024 interview with Metal Hammer the band rejected the term, stating "I'm not sure it's that accurate, to be honest. I'm not going to pretend that we aren't super-pissed off about a lot of stuff... but so are a lot of other genres." Other pissedcore bands include Saltwound.

== See also ==
- List of nu metalcore bands
