= The Opportunity to Be =

EP by My Ticket Home
- Released: November 8, 2010
- Genre: Metalcore; Post-hardcore
- Length: 24:12
- Label: Rise
- Producer: Caleb Shomo

My Ticket Home chronology
Above the Great City (2009)	The Opportunity to Be (2010)	To Create A Cure (2012)

The Opportunity to Be is the second EP released by American heavy metal band My Ticket Home. It was released in 2010, through Rise Records. It is the band's first release with Rise Records, as well as the only album to feature guitarist Eli Ford.

== Track listing ==
No.	Title	Length
1.	"Surroundings"	3:00
2.	"Desertion"	3:40
3.	"Refuge in Purpose"	3:31
4.	"In Regret"	3:46
5.	"Half Hearted"	3:08
6.	"Dead Weight (featuring Caleb Shomo)"	3:20
7.	"The Opportunity to Be"	3:47
Total length:		24:12

Bonus tracks
No.	Title	Length
8.	"Firework (Katy Perry cover)"	3:54
Total length:		28:06

== Personnel ==
My Ticket Home

- Nick Giumenti – unclean vocals
- Sean Mackowski – guitars, clean vocals
- Eli Ford – guitars
- Luke Fletcher – bass
- Marshal Giumenti – drums

Production

- Caleb Shomo – production, engineering, mastering, mixing, keyboards, programming
