= No One Should Read This =

2018 EP by Tallah

EP by Tallah
- Released: August 16, 2018
- Studio: Spin Studios
- Length: 21:52
- Label: Independent
- Producer: Evan Rodaniche

Tallah chronology
No One Should Read This (2018)	Matriphagy (2020)

Tallah EP chronology
No One Should Read This (2018)	Talladdin (2021)

Singles from No One Should Read This
- 1. "Placenta" Released: May 15, 2018; 2. "Cottonmouth" Released: August 17, 2018

No One Should Read This is the debut EP by the American heavy metal band Tallah. Released in August 2018, it explores the same concept as on their debut studio album Matriphagy, released two years later, on which all five songs make an appearance.

== History ==
"Placenta", the first single from the EP, was released on 15 May 2018. The song draws influences from both nu metal and thrash metal, containing a guitar solo at the end which is notably atypical for the former genre. Drummer Max Portnoy stated the song is "like 2001, but with all the new age twist you could want and none of the rehashed bullshit". Guitarist AJ Wisniewski called it "very anxiety inducing".

The second released single, "Cottonmouth", came out roughly alongside the rest of the EP. Upon the release of the song's music video, the band stated they "the video is just as brutal visually as the song is musically".

== Expansion into Matriphagy ==
All five of the songs on No One Should Read This are also present on Matriphagy, the band's 2020 debut album. The name of the EP was also used as the name of the second track on Matriphagy. None of the audio for these five tracks was re-recorded for the album; the same stereo masters were utilised and were simply mixed differently.

== Track listing ==
No.	Title	Length
1.	"Kungan"	4:36
2.	"Placenta"	4:08
3.	"We, the Sad"	5:09
4.	"Cottonmouth"	2:53
5.	"Red Light"	5:06
Total length:		21:52

== Personnel ==
Adapted from physical cardboard CD sleeve.

Tallah

- Justin Bonitz – vocals
- Derrick Schneider – lead guitar
- AJ Wisniewski – rhythm guitar
- Andrew Cooper – bass
- Max Portnoy – drums

Other

- Evan Rodaniche – mixing, mastering
- Nik Chinboukas – engineering
- Domonick Giorgianni – photography
