= Sylar (band) =

American metal band

- Origin: Queens, New York, U.S.
- Genres: Metalcore; nu metal
- Years active: 2011–2019, 2026–present
- Labels: Hopeless; Razor & Tie
- Members: Jayden Panesso; Miguel Cardona; Dustin Jennings; Richard Wicander; Jeff Melo
- Past members: Thomas Veroutis; Stephen "Steve" Dillaro; Evan Buksbaum; Michael "Mike" Seghposs; Jay Hu; Travis Hufton; Cody Ash
- Website: sylarny.tumblr.com

Sylar is an American nu metal band formed in Queens, New York in 2011. The band members formed from various bands in the New York City post-hardcore scene, and took their name from the Heroes villain Sylar.

The band is part of the NYHC movement, and consisted of vocalist Jayden Panesso, rhythm guitarist/clean vocalist Miguel Cardona, lead guitarist Dustin Jennings, bassist Richard Wicander, and drummer Jeff Melo.

== History ==
Sylar formed in Queens, New York, in 2011, with Jayden Panesso and Thomas Veroutis after the two future band members connected on social media.

The band has been described as creating a sound as if they use the studio "like an extra instrument... heavily produced and processed, with angular edits and heavily gated guitars creating an almost mechanical sound."

Shortly after their formation, they released their debut EP with Cutting The Ties in 2011. The band were signed to Razor & Tie records in 2013. Their production sound is heavily inspired by Caleb Shomo of Beartooth and Attack Attack! who helped produce their second EP, Deadbeat, in 2013, and their debut album, To Whom It May Concern, which was released on May 13, 2014.

In 2016 the band released their second studio album, Help!, on Hopeless Records, which was followed by the release of three singles "Assume", "Dark Daze" and "Soul Addiction".

Their third album, Seasons, was released on October 5, 2018.

On April 11, 2021, the lead vocalist of the band Jayden Panesso announced on his Twitter account that new Sylar music was being worked on after an extended hiatus.

On January 14, 2026, the band released a new song titled "Pushing Me Off" off an untitled new album, marking their first new song since Seasons, and thus, ending their extended hiatus.

== Musical style and influences ==
In an interview with Dead Press, the members of the band cited Bring Me the Horizon's Sempiternal, Deftones's eponymous fourth album, Slipknot's Iowa, Atreyu's the Curse and Poison's Open Up and Say... Ahh! as their biggest musical influences. They have been categorised as nu metalcore, metalcore and nu metal.

== Band members ==
Current

- Jayden Panesso – lead vocals (2011–2019, 2026–present)
- Miguel Cardona – clean vocals, rhythm guitar (2012–2019, 2026–present)
- Dustin Jennings – lead guitar (2012–2019, 2026–present)
- Richard Wicander – bass guitar (2026–present)
- Jeff Melo – drums (2026–present)

Former

- Jay Hu – lead guitar (2011)
- Stephen "Steve" Dillaro – bass guitar (2011–2012), rhythm guitar (2012)
- Evan Buksbaum – lead guitar (2011–2012)
- Michael "Mike" Seghposs – rhythm guitar (2011–2012)
- Thomas Veroutis – drums, percussion (2011–2017)
- Travis Hufton – bass guitar (2012–2019)
- Cody Ash – drums, percussion (2017–2019, 2016 touring)

Timeline

== Discography ==
Studio albums

- To Whom It May Concern (2014)
- Help! (2016) No. 31 Top Rock Albums
- Seasons (2018)

EPs

- Cutting the Ties (2011)
- Deadbeat (2013)

Singles

- "Golden Retreat" (2013)
- "Mirrors" (2014)
- "Assume" (2016)
- "Dark Daze" (2016)
- "Soul Addiction" (2017) No. 38 Mainstream Rock Songs
- "All or Nothing" (2018) No. 35 Mainstream Rock Songs
- "Points of Authority" (2017)
- "No Way" (2018)
- "Open Wounds" (2018)
- "Pushing Me Off" (2026)
- "Raw" (2026)
- "Lovely Day" (2026)
