= My Ticket Home =

American heavy metal band

- My Ticket Home in 2013

Background information
- Origin: Columbus, Ohio, U.S.
- Genres: Nu metal; metalcore; post-hardcore; hardcore punk
- Years active: 2008–present
- Labels: Puke Rock; Spinefarm; Rise
- Spinoffs: Beartooth
- Members: Nick Giumenti; Matt Gallucci; Derek Blevins; Marshal Giumenti
- Past members: Jeremy Flowers; Sean Mackowski; Eli Ford; Luke Fletcher; Nick Salemi; Matt Seidel; Dusty Trails

My Ticket Home is an American heavy metal band formed in 2008 from Columbus, Ohio. They have released two EPs and four full-length albums. Their first three releases exemplified metalcore and hardcore punk, while 2013's Strangers Only marked a departure into a style fusing both metalcore and nu metal, called nu metalcore. They also incorporated grunge on their 2017 album UnReal. The band refers to their newer music as "puke rock".

== Musical style and influences ==
My Ticket Home has been described as nu metal, metalcore, nu metalcore, hardcore punk and post-hardcore. They have cited influences including Stick to Your Guns, the Chariot, Anberlin, Stray from the Path, Panic! At the Disco, Killswitch Engage, Every Time I Die, the Dillinger Escape Plan, Parkway Drive, Underoath, Nirvana, Rage Against the Machine, Snot, Korn, Slipknot, Limp Bizkit, Linkin Park, Deftones, Oasis, Incubus, Portishead and System of a Down.

They have been cited as an influence by Graphic Nature and Thornhill. In a 2023 interview, Static Dress vocalist Olli Appleyard stated "Stranger Only... that record is so good. I hear people now ripping that off and I'm like 'Goddamn it. nothing will ever be as good as that record'".

== Members ==
Current members

- Nick Giumenti – unclean vocals (2009–present), lead vocals, bass (2013–present), lead guitar (2008–2009)
- Marshal Giumenti – drums (2008–present), backing vocals (2013–present)
- Matt Gallucci – lead guitar (2011–present), backing vocals (2013–present)
- Derek Blevins – rhythm guitar, vocals (2011–present)

Former members

- Jeremy Flowers – lead vocals (2008–2009)
- Nick Salemi – keyboards, additional unclean vocals (2008–2009), clean vocals (2009)
- Matt Seidel – lead guitar (2009)
- Eli Ford – lead guitar (2009–2011)
- Sean Mackowski – rhythm guitar (2008–2011), clean vocals (2009–2012)
- Luke Fletcher – bass (2008–2013), backing vocals (2011–2013)

Timeline

== Discography ==
=== Studio albums ===
- To Create A Cure (2012) No. 45 Billboard Indie, No. 12 Billboard Heatseekers
- Strangers Only (2013)
- UnReal (2017)
- Pure to a Fault (2025)

=== EPs ===
- Above the Great City (2009)
- The Opportunity To Be (2010)

=== Singles ===
- "A New Breed" (2012)
- "Thrush" (2017)
- "Hyperreal" (2017)
- "We All Use" (2017)
- "Flypaper" (2017)
- "We're in This Together" (Nine Inch Nails cover) (2018)
- "Through The Needle's Eye" (2018)
- "Tearjoint" (2025)
- "Urethane" (2025)
- "Nothing Lost" (2025)
- "Flooded Eyes" (2025)
- "Army of Me" (Björk cover) (2026)

=== Music videos ===
- "A New Breed" (2012)
- "Hot Soap" (2014)
- "Spit Not Chewed" (2014)
- "Ayahuasca" (2015)
- "Hyperreal" (2017)
- "Flypaper" (2018)
- "Time Kills Everything" (2018)
- "Nothing Lost" (2025)
