= Posthuman (Harm's Way album) =

Studio album by Harm's Way
- Released: February 9, 2018
- Recorded: August 2017
- Studio: Graphic Nature Audio (Belleville, New Jersey)
- Genre: Metalcore; industrial metal; nu metal
- Length: 33:57
- Label: Metal Blade
- Producer: Will Putney

Harm's Way chronology
Rust (2015)	Posthuman (2018)	Common Suffering (2023)

Professional ratings
Review scores
Source	Rating
Exclaim!	8/10
Metal Injection	8/10
Pitchfork	6.8/10.0

Posthuman is the fourth studio album by the American hardcore band Harm's Way. The album was released on February 9, 2018 and marked the band's first release through Metal Blade Records. Vocalist James Pligge says the album is influenced to a smaller extent by Slipknot, but to a larger extent Triptykon and Machine Head. Harm's Way promoted the album with music videos for "Become a Machine" and "Last Man", and online streams of "Human Carrying Capacity" and "Call My Name".

Critics generally gave Posthuman favorable reviews, with several reviewers noticing an increased emphasis on industrial metal and nu metal over previous releases. In Andy O'Connor's review for Pitchfork, he wrote about what he perceived to be the album's influences, stating: "While still a hardcore record, Posthuman does tip the balance towards Rust's industrial flirtations. 'Temptation' takes Godflesh's rumbling, mechanical bass and sets it to a slinking Jesus Lizard groove, then charts a course that resembles if Deftones went further in on their dream pop influences." Joe Smith-Engelhardt of Exclaim! described the album as a standout in the recent trend of bands blending nu metal and hardcore, elaborating: "In the last few years, a substantial number of hardcore acts have been adopting nu metal influences with mixed results, but Harm's Way have managed to tastefully incorporate a groove element into their music. Songs such as 'Unreality' and 'Dissect Me' intertwine classic nu metal elements with hardcore while avoiding sounding gimmicky or nostalgic."

The publications Exclaim! and Revolver named it one of 2018's best metal and hardcore albums.

== Track listing ==
1. "Human Carrying Capacity" – 3:18
2. "Last Man" – 1:59
3. "Sink" – 3:12
4. "Temptation" – 3:54
5. "Become a Machine" – 3:12
6. "Call My Name" – 4:23
7. "Unreality" – 2:26
8. "Dissect Me" – 4:19
9. "The Gift" – 2:28
10. "Dead Space" – 4:46

== Personnel ==
Posthuman personnel adapted from CD liner notes.

=== Harm's Way ===
- Bo Lueders – guitars, vocals
- Nick Gauthier – guitars, vocals
- Christopher Mills – drums
- James Pligge – vocals

=== Additional musicians ===
- Jason Jancetic – additional guitars
- Casey Soyk - programming on "The Gift"

=== Production and artwork ===
- Will Putney – engineering, mixing and mastering at Graphic Nature Audio
- Steve Seid – additional engineering
- David Altmejd – Cover art image
- E. Aaron Ross – Layout and design
