= Tallah =

American nu metal band

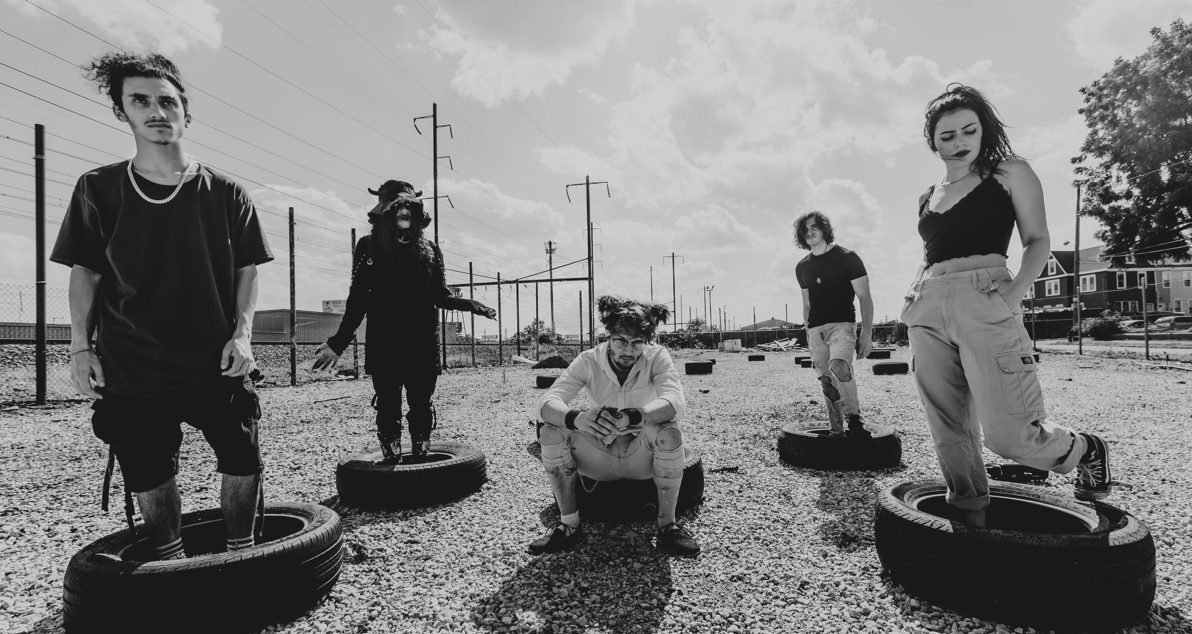
- Tallah in 2022, left to right: Max Portnoy, former member Alizé "Mewzen" Rodriguez, Justin Bonitz, Derrick Schneider, and Alex Snowden.

Background information
- Origin: Pennsylvania, U.S.
- Genres: Nu metal; metalcore; alternative metal; rap metal
- Years active: 2017–present
- Label: Earache
- Members: Derrick Schneider; Max Portnoy; Justin Bonitz; Alex Snowden; Joel McDonald; Ivan Little
- Past members: Nick Malfara; AJ Wisniewski; Eric Novroski; Andrew Cooper; Alizé "Mewzen" Rodriguez

Tallah is an American heavy metal band from Pennsylvania. They are currently signed to Earache Records. The band consists of vocalist Justin Bonitz, lead guitarist Derrick Schneider, rhythm guitarist Alex Snowden, bassist Max Portnoy, drummer Joel McDonald and turntablist Ivan Little.

The band was formed in 2017 by drummer Max Portnoy (son of Mike Portnoy), lead guitarist Derrick Schneider, and bassist Andrew Cooper. The band has released three studio albums, Matriphagy (2020), The Generation of Danger (2022), and Primeval: Obsession // Detachment (2025). Often described as a "nu-core" band, Tallah mixes nu metal, metalcore, alternative metal, and rap metal, with elements of hardcore, industrial, deathcore, and electronic music.

== History ==
=== Formation and No One Should Read This (2017–2020) ===
Tallah was formed in Pennsylvania in 2017 by drummer Max Portnoy (son of Dream Theater's drummer Mike Portnoy), Next to None lead guitarist Derrick Schneider, and bassist Andrew Cooper. They added rhythm guitarists Nick Malfara and AJ Wisniewski later that year, while looking for a vocalist to front the band. Portnoy knew of future singer Justin Bonitz through Bonitz's YouTube channels, Hungry Lights, and through Bonitz winning a competition created by Jared Dines. Bonitz joined the band on January 1, 2018. At the end of 2017, the band had already recorded instrumental demos for their EP No One Should Read This, and within six days Bonitz had written lyrics and self-recorded vocals for each track. Their first live performance was on January 7, 2018.

After playing their first few shows as a six-piece, Malfara left Tallah in March 2018. One month later, the band announced their first tour, "The Ontology Tour", to begin in May. While on tour, the band released a music video for their first single, "Placenta." In June 2018, Wisniewski left the band, and they picked up Eric Novroski as their new rhythm guitarist. In August 2018, Tallah released a music video for their song "Cottonmouth". The band then held the supporting slot for A Killer's Confession on tour, after which they announced Novroski as their new permanent guitarist.

On April 25, 2019, the band announced that they had signed to Earache Records. On July 16, the music video for "We, the Sad" was released. Two days later, the band played a show at The Lizard Lounge in Lancaster, Pennsylvania, during which Bonitz climbed onto the ceiling of the venue. A security guard told him to get down, leading to Bonitz punching and kicking the guard. Bonitz claims he did not know the person was a security guard and that they violently grabbed him first while he was still hanging from an I-beam. He was subsequently arrested before being released on bail.

=== Matriphagy, Talladdin and line-up changes (2020–2022) ===
In 2020, Alizé "Mewzen" Rodriguez joined as the band's DJ, and they also debuted their new rhythm guitarist, Alex Snowden from Doll Skin. After releasing a music video for the song "Red Light" on January 21, 2020, Tallah announced they were entering the studio with Josh Schroeder to produce their debut album, Matriphagy. The album's first single, "The Silo", was released on June 5, followed by "We, the Sad" on July 2, and "Red Light" on July 23, 2020. On August 6, 2020, the fourth single, "Placenta" was released. On August 20, 2020, "Overconfidence" was released as the fifth single. On September 11, 2020, "L.E.D." was released as the sixth single. Matriphagy was released on October 2, 2020. On October 15, 2020, the band released a music video for the seventh single, "No One Should Read This". On February 18, 2021, the band released a music video for the eighth and final single, "Cottonmouth". The music videos of all EP songs were also re-released with remixed audio.

Tallah released a live shot concert on October 1, 2020, in which they played their debut album Matriphagy in its entirety. On April 1, 2021, Tallah announced the Talladdin EP alongside the first single "Friend Like Me". This EP consists of five covers from the Aladdin soundtrack exclusive to their Patreon page. On August 17, 2021, they released the single and music video "Vanilla Paste", featuring guest vocals from Grant Hood of Guerilla Warfare, AJ Channer of Fire From the Gods, and Tom Barber of Chelsea Grin.

=== The Generation of Danger and Primeval: Obsession // Detachment (2022–present) ===
On March 9, 2022, they released the single and music video "Telescope", and announced their upcoming album entitled The Generation of Danger, along with a temporary release date of September 9, 2022. The band supported All That Remains on their spring 2022 US tour that began on March 12, 2022, in Worcester, Massachusetts. On April 19, 2022, they released the second single off the album, "The Impressionist" with a music video. In August 2022, they announced that the album's release would be pushed back to November 18. On September 1, 2022, they released "Shaken (Not Stirred)" as a single with a music video. On October 13, 2022, they released the single "For the Recognition" with a music video. On November 10, 2022, they released the fifth and final single, "Dicker's Done". The Generation of Danger was released on November 18, 2022.

Tallah spent the first half of 2023 touring in support of their sophomore album. In August 2023, grooming allegations were brought up against the band's DJ Alizé "Mewzen" Rodriguez, which resulted in his immediate removal from the band. A tour by Left to Suffer was announced in October 2023, with Tallah as one of the supporting acts. Thomas Cucé, who had previously played with Portnoy and Schneider in Next To None, became a touring replacement for Mewzen. On October 11, 2023, the band released the song "Hard Knock". In January 2024, it was announced that the band would support Kim Dracula on a March 2024 tour. They spent the year touring in support of The Generation of Danger, playing select shows in Europe and the UK and participating in the Summer Slaughter Tour in July and August.

On April 2, 2025, the band released the song "What We Know" as the lead single from their third studio album, Primeval: Obsession // Detachment, along with a release date of September 5, 2025. The album is their first with Portnoy moving from drums to bass guitar, with Joel McDonald taking over on drums. It is also their first album with DJ Ivan Little. On May 7, 2025, the second single, "A Primeval Detachment" was released. On June 11, 2025, the third single, "Augmented" was released. On July 15, 2025, the fourth single, "As Fate Undoes" was released. The fifth single, "Undone By Fate", was released on August 22, 2025. On the same day, it was announced that the band would support King 810 on their U.S. fall tour from November 3 to November 25. On the same day as the release of their third album, a music video for the song "Depleted" was released. On September 12, 2025, the band was featured on the Audiotree Live studio performance release uploaded to YouTube. The performance was recorded on April 4.

== Artistry ==
=== Style and influences ===
Tallah has been referred to as a nu metalcore or "nu-core" band, and more specifically as nu metal, metalcore, alternative metal, and rap metal. The band's music also contains elements of deathcore, death metal, hardcore, extreme metal, mathcore, funk, electronic, and industrial. (Note: Musical styles: primary genres: "nu-core" and "nu metalcore"; "nu metal"; "metalcore"; "alternative metal"; "rap metal"; other genres: "deathcore"; "death metal"; "hardcore"; "extreme metal"; "mathcore"; "funk"; "electronic"; "industrial") John D. Buchanan of AllMusic described Tallah as a "nu-core" quartet...[that brings] back the spirit of early-2000s nu-metal with gnarly riffs, whipcrack drums, electronic textures, and tortured vocals." AllMusic also noted influences from "contemporary hardcore". According to Next Mosh, "[Tallah's music includes]...screaming vocals [mixed] with melodic choruses and driving bass guitar with deep and dirty tones, syncing up effortlessly with the thunderous bellow of drums and the screeching ping of the snare." In a review of the band's debut, Matriphagy, Graham Ray of Distorted Sound Mag wrote, "Tallah takes nu-metal to gruesome new heights on Matriphagy with its unsettling lyrical themes and crushing breakdowns." Phillip Trapp of Revolver described their second album, The Generation of Danger, as "a ferocious fusion of early Slipknot intensity — spitfire vocals and grooves that dig deep...and modern hardcore savagery à la Vein.fm and Knocked Loose." Their third album, Primeval: Obsession // Detachment, was also described as nu metal, but took a more experimental approach. The album was recorded live with all instruments being recorded simultaneously with no click track, while vocalist Justin Bonitz recorded the album's vocals in a single, continuous take. The album also introduces new elements to the band's sound, such as string sections, acoustic guitars, and slapped basslines.

Bonitz cites Slipknot, Linkin Park, Korn, System of a Down, Code Orange, Fire from the Gods, and Knocked Loose as his influences. Drummer Max Portnoy cites Joey Jordison and Chris Adler as his influences.

The band members other influences include Maximum the Hormone, Varials, Poison the Well, Kublai Khan TX, King 810, Killswitch Engage, Limp Bizkit, Mudvayne, Northlane, Spiritbox, Periphery, Deftones and Nothing More.

=== Songwriting and lyrical themes ===
The band's vocalist, Justin Bonitz, writes the lyrics and tends to focus on themes and writing concept albums. The band's debut album, Matriphagy, is about a "man who is trapped in a house, under the thumb of his mother, and begins to lose his mind and touch insanity as he scrambles to escape. The album touches on oppression, society’s social engineering, nature vs. nurture, metaphysics, and all kinds of psychological themes." Their second album, The Generation of Danger, follows a mad scientist who works on behalf of a large corporation. He becomes increasingly frustrated due to his inventions being credited to the company rather than himself, eventually leading him to force the company to take part in "the greatest experiment the world of science has ever seen". The story of their third album, Primeval: Obsession // Detachment, takes place on an alien planet and centers on a nurse "Ana" and an assassin "Sheelah"—a group of beings tasks Ana and Sheelah with performing tasks meant to test their morals and values. The themes include morality, personal beliefs, and determining how to fit within a society.

== Band members ==
Current members

- Derrick Schneider – lead guitar, backing vocals (2017–present), bass (2021–2024, studio), rhythm guitar (2019–2020)
- Max Portnoy – drums, percussion (2017–2024), bass (2024–present, 2023–2024 touring)
- Justin Bonitz – vocals (2018–present)
- Alex Snowden – rhythm guitar (2020–present)
- Joel McDonald – drums (2024–present, 2022–2024 touring member)
- Ivan Little – turntables, samples, keyboards (2024–present)

Former members

- Nick Malfara – rhythm guitar (2017–2018)
- AJ Wisniewski – rhythm guitar (2017–2018)
- Eric Novroski – rhythm guitar (2018–2019)
- Andrew Cooper – bass (2017–2021)
- Alizé "Mewzen" Rodriguez – turntables, samples, keyboards (2020–2023)

Former touring musicians

- Marc Naples – bass (2021–2022)
- Tyler Hinson – bass (2022–2023)
- Matthew Ryan – drums (2021)
- Tyler Bogliole – drums (2022)
- Thomas Cucé – turntables, samples, keyboards (2023–2024)

Timeline

== Discography ==
=== Albums ===
Title	Album details
Matriphagy	Released: October 2, 2020; Label: Earache; Formats: CD, LP, DL
The Generation of Danger	Released: November 18, 2022; Label: Earache; Formats: CD, CS, LP, DL
Primeval: Obsession // Detachment	Released: September 5, 2025; Label: Earache; Formats: CD, LP, DL

=== EPs ===
Title	EP details
No One Should Read This	Released: August 16, 2018; Label: Independent; Formats: CD, LP, DL
Talladdin	Released: 2020; Label: Independent; Formats: DL

=== Singles ===
Year	Title	Album
2018	"Placenta"	No One Should Read This
2018	"Cottonmouth"	No One Should Read This
2020	"The Silo"	Matriphagy
2020	"We, the Sad"	Matriphagy
2020	"Gooba" (6ix9ine cover)	Non-album single
2020	"Red Light"	Matriphagy
2020	"Placenta"	Matriphagy
2020	"Overconfidence"	Matriphagy
2020	"L.E.D."	Matriphagy
2020	"No One Should Read This"	Matriphagy
2021	"Cottonmouth"	Matriphagy
2021	"Friend Like Me"	Talladdin
2021	"Vanilla Paste"	Non-album single
2022	"Telescope"	The Generation of Danger
2022	"The Impressionist"	The Generation of Danger
2022	"Shaken (Not Stirred)"	The Generation of Danger
2022	"For the Recognition"	The Generation of Danger
2022	"Dicker's Done"	The Generation of Danger
2023	"Hard Knock"	Non-album single
2025	"What We Know"	Primeval: Obsession // Detachment
2025	"A Primeval Detachment"	Primeval: Obsession // Detachment
2025	"Augmented"	Primeval: Obsession // Detachment
2025	"As Fate Undoes"	Primeval: Obsession // Detachment
2025	"Undone by Fate"	Primeval: Obsession // Detachment

=== Music videos ===
Year	Title	Director	Album	Ref.
2018	"Placenta"	Rob Dyke	No One Should Read This	
2018	"Cottonmouth"	Max Portnoy	No One Should Read This	
2019	"We, the Sad"	Paul Stamper	No One Should Read This	
2020	"Red Light"	Errick Easterday	No One Should Read This	
2020	"Gooba" (6ix9ine cover)	—N/a	—N/a	
2020	"The Silo"	Max Portnoy	Matriphagy	
2020	"We, the Sad"	Paul Stamper	Matriphagy	
2020	"Red Light"	Errick Easterday	Matriphagy	
2020	"Placenta"	Rob Dyke	Matriphagy	
2020	"Overconfidence"	Anthony Altamura	Matriphagy	
2020	"L.E.D."	Anthony Altamura	Matriphagy	
2020	"No One Should Read This"	Max Portnoy	Matriphagy	
2021	"Cottonmouth"	Max Portnoy	Matriphagy	
2021	"Vanilla Paste"	Anthony Altamura	—N/a	
2022	"Telescope"	Anthony Altamura	The Generation of Danger	
2022	"The Impressionist"	Anthony Altamura	The Generation of Danger	
2022	"Shaken (Not Stirred)"	Max Portnoy	The Generation of Danger	
2022	"For the Recognition"	Max Portnoy	The Generation of Danger	
2023	"Hard Knock" (visualizer)	Jon Fonseca	—N/a	
2025	"What We Know"	Max Portnoy	Primeval: Obsession // Detachment	
2025	"A Primeval Detachment"	Max Portnoy	Primeval: Obsession // Detachment	
2025	"Augmented"	—N/a	Primeval: Obsession // Detachment	
2025	"As Fate Undoes"	Max Portnoy	Primeval: Obsession // Detachment	
2025	"Depleted"	DerekFilms	Primeval: Obsession // Detachment	
