= Sworn In (band) =

American metalcore band

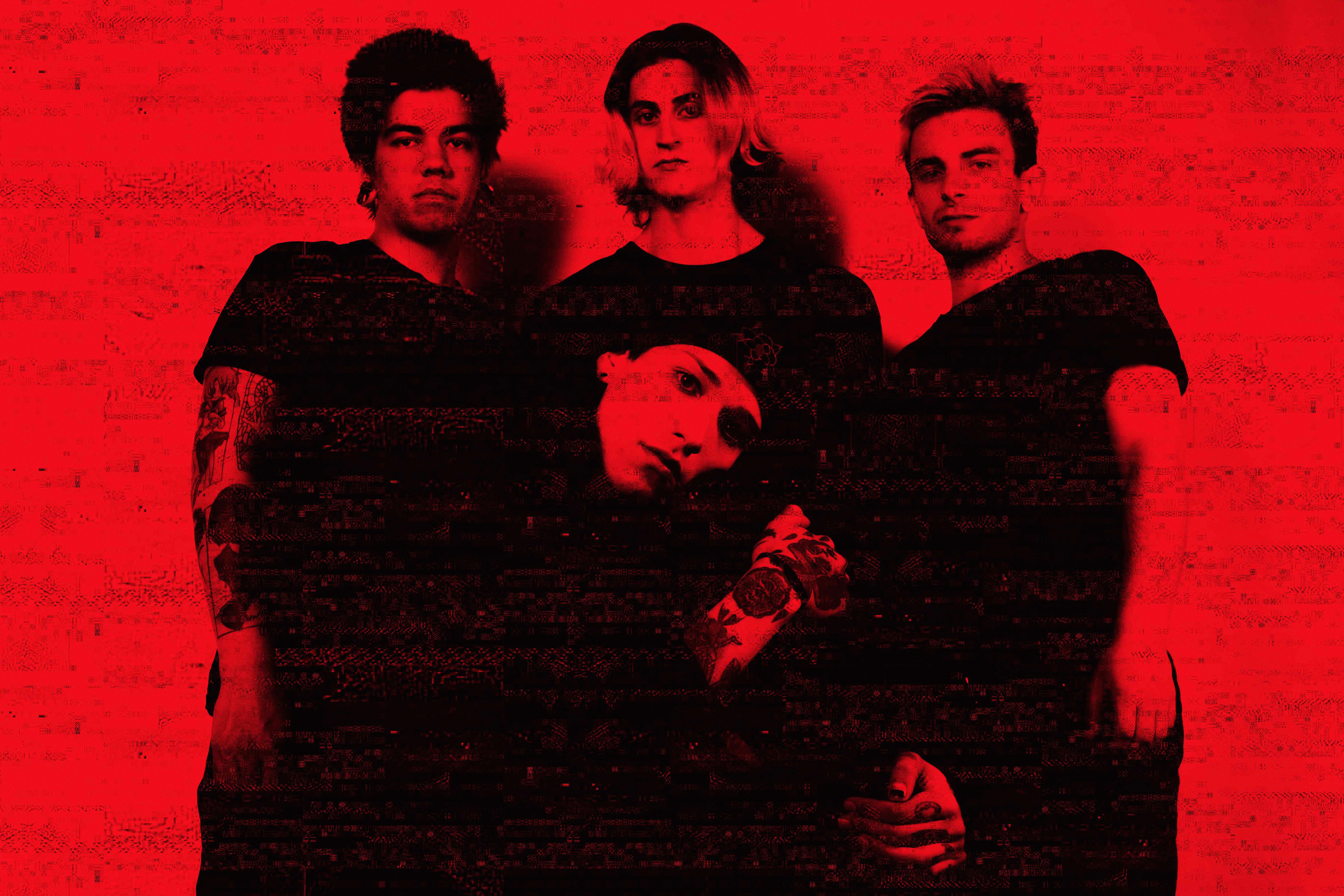
- Clockwise from top-left: Chris George, Derek Bolman, Eugene Kamlyuk and Tyler Dennen

Background information
- Also known as: Buried by the Ocean (2010-March 2011)
- Origin: Grayslake, Illinois, U.S
- Genres: Metalcore, nu metalcore
- Years active: 2011–2022
- Labels: We Are Triumphant, Razor & Tie, Fearless Records
- Past members: Eugene Kamlyuk; Derek Bolman; Chris George; Alex Marcelletti; Zakary Gibson; Kenny Pickett; Mike Piontek; Sean Banks; Peter Massouros; Matt Redlin; Tyler Dennen; Kyle Cholewinski

Sworn In was an American metalcore band from Grayslake, Illinois. The band was formed in 2011 and split up in 2022.

They were signed to Razor & Tie from May 2013 to the summer of 2016, after which they were signed to Fearless Records.

== History ==
Prior to Sworn In, vocalist Tyler Dennen, drummer/songwriter Chris George, guitarist Eugene Kamlyuk, and bassist Mike Piontek played in a band called "Shift Into Focus". When the group disbanded, these four sought to start a new band known as Buried by the Ocean. Buried by the Ocean began playing local shows in high school before the band later changed their name to Sworn In. Sworn In then played their first show under the new name in March 2011. The following month, the band released their first EP titled Catharsis, after this release Dennen left the band. Guitarist Kamlyuk then fronted the band at this point and recorded vocals for the band's second EP titled Start/End, which was released in 2012. That same year, Dennen returned to the band as vocalist and recorded a single titled "Let Down" featuring Chad Ruhlig of For the Fallen Dreams. They cited influences including the Acacia Strain, Meshuggah, Between the Buried and Me, Emmure and My Chemical Romance.

After a signing to Razor & Tie, Sworn In recorded and released their debut album The Death Card in 2013 after releasing the single "Three Cheers" from it. The album charted at number 184 at the Billboard 200 charts.

They toured USA and Canada several times and played as support for bands like Hundredth, Thy Art Is Murder, For the Fallen Dreams, I See Stars, Upon This Dawning, Emmure, and Escape the Fate. In May 2014 they toured Europe for the first time. In November 2014, they were on the Monster Outbreak Tour with Attila, Crown the Empire, and Like Moths to Flames.

On February 12, 2015, Sworn In released their first single from their sophomore album, titled The Lovers/The Devil. On March 3, 2015, Sworn In premiered the song "I Don't Really Love You", which also appeared on the new album. The band released their single "Oliolioxinfree" on March 17, 2015. Their second album, titled The Lovers/The Devil, was released on April 7, 2015.

Starting from March 2015 Sworn In toured with The Plot In You, I Declare War, and Gift Giver.

Sworn In was included on the 2015 (and final) Mayhem Festival, which was headlined by Slayer.

On March 20, 2017, the band announced that they had signed with Fearless Records, through which they will be releasing their third full-length album later in the year.

On May 18, 2017, the band released a music video for the song "Make It Hurt" following an announcement for their upcoming third studio album All Smiles. The same day, the band livestreamed a 30-minute loop for their song "Don't Look At Me", along with the song being released the next day. On June 22, 2018, it was announced that Tyler Dennen would be leaving Sworn In, and that they were re-releasing their debut EP "Start/End." It was also revealed that Eugene Kamlyuk would be returning to lead vocals, and that Chris George would be moving to guitar and the new drummer is Kyle Cholewinski.

On September 14, 2019, the band released a new song called "Shit Talk", their first offering of new material since Tyler Dennen's departure.

After a few years of inactivity, drummer George finally confirmed in 2022 that Sworn In had split up.

== Members ==
Final lineup (at time of 2022 breakup)

- Chris George – drums (2010–2018), guitars (2018–2022)
- Eugene Kamlyuk – guitars, vocals (2010–2011; 2013–2018), lead vocals (2011–2012, 2018–2022)
- Derek Bolman – bass (2013–2022)
- Alex Marcelletti – drums (2019–2022)

Former

- Tyler Dennen – lead vocals (2010–2011, 2012–2018)
- Zakary Gibson – guitars, vocals (2010–2012, 2013–2016)
- Mike Piontek – bass (2010–2012)
- Peter Massouros – guitars (2011–2012)
- Matt Redlin – guitars (2011–2012)
- Kenny Pickett – guitars (2012–2013)
- Sean Banks – bass (2012–2013)
- Kyle Cholewinski – drums (2018–2019)

Timeline

== Discography ==
=== Studio albums ===
| Year | Details | Peak chart positions | | | | |
| Year | Details | US | US Heat. | US Rock | US Hard Rock | US Indie. |
|---|---|---|---|---|---|---|
| 2013 | The Death Card: Release: August 20, 2013; Label: Razor & Tie; Formats: CD, LP, download | 184 | 7 | — | 16 | 39 |
| 2015 | The Lovers/The Devil: Release: April 7, 2015; Label: Razor & Tie; Formats: CD, LP, download | — | 7 | 35 | 7 | 20 |
| 2017 | All Smiles: Release: June 30, 2017; Label: Fearless; Formats: CD, LP, download | — | 6 | — | — | — |

=== EPs ===
| Year | Album details |
|---|---|
| 2011 | Catharsis: Released: April 30, 2011; Label: None; Format: Music download |
| 2012 | Start/End: Released: January 23, 2012; Label: We Are Triumphant; Format: Music download |

=== Singles ===
- "No Salvation (featuring Marco Mandujano)" (Self distributed), (2011)
- "A Song for the Nameless" (The Death Card) (2012)
- "Let Down (featuring Chad Ruhlig of For the Fallen Dreams)" (Self distributed), (2012)
- "Three Cheers" (The Death Card) (2012)
- "Snake Eyes" (The Death Card) (Razor & Tie), (2013)
- "Dead Soul" (The Death Card) (Razor & Tie), (2014)
- "Mindless" (The Death Card) (Razor & Tie), (2014)
- "Sunshine" (The Lovers/The Devil) (Razor & Tie), (2015)
- "Oliolioxinfree" (The Lovers/The Devil) (Razor & Tie), (2015)
- "I Don't Really Love You" (The Lovers/The Devil) (Razor & Tie), (2015)
- "Lay with Me" (The Lovers/The Devil) (Razor & Tie), (2015)
- "Endless Gray" ("Endless Gray – Single") (Independent), (2016)
- "Make It Hurt" (All Smiles) (Fearless Records), (2017)
- "Don't Look At Me" (All Smiles) (Fearless Records), (2017)
- "Dread All" (All Smiles) (Fearless Records) (2017)
- "All Smiles" (All Smiles) (Fearless Records) (2017)
- "Shit Talk" (2019)
- "Gun Fight" (2019)

=== Music videos ===
- "A Song for the Nameless" (2013)
- "Snake Eyes" (2013)
- "Dead Soul" (2014)
- "Mindless" (2014)
- "Scissors" (2015)
- "Endless Gray" (2016)
- "Make It Hurt" (2017)
- "Don't Look At Me" (2017)
- "Dread All" (2017)
- "All Smiles" (2017)
- "Shit Talk" (2019)
