= Justin Bonitz =

American singer (born 1990)

- Born: Justin Matthew Bonitz; September 25, 1990 (age 36)
- Genres: Nu metal; metalcore; alternative metal; rap metal; deathcore
- Occupations: Singer; songwriter; musician; vocal coach; social media personality
- Instruments: Vocals; guitar; bass
- Years active: 2007–present
- Member of: Tallah; Hungry Lights; amnaeon; Graystone; Enough of Me

YouTube information
- Channels: Hungry Lights; Hungry Covers
- Years active: 2015–present
- Genre: Music
- Subscribers: 134 thousand (Hungry Lights); 163 thousand (Hungry Covers)
- Views: 11 million (Hungry Lights); 17.6 million (Hungry Covers)
- Last updated: April 12, 2026

Justin Matthew Bonitz (born September 25, 1990) is an American singer, songwriter, musician, vocal coach, and social media personality. He is best known as the lead vocalist of the band Tallah, the bassist and vocalist of the band Graystone, the sole member of the project Hungry Lights and a contestant on Season 1 and 2 of the reality gameshow Musician Mansion.

== Career ==
=== Early projects (2007–2015) ===
Bonitz's musical career began at the age of 10 due to playing the guitar against his will, causing an initial dislike of it, although this view had changed by the following year after writing original material. Bonitz's career as a vocalist began at age 17 after forming a band named "6 Minutes to a Wheelchair", which was later renamed to "Blind Can't Follow" and then "amnaeon". He initially experimented with screaming in an attempt to stay awake while driving; the song playing at the time was "State of the Union" by Rise Against.

All other members of the band eventually left, resulting in the continuation of amnaeon as a Bonitz solo project.

=== Hungry Lights (2015–2017) ===
After the folding of amnaeon, Bonitz started a new solo project titled "Hungry Lights". He started another YouTube channel for this project, as well as a second channel, "Hungry Covers", intended for cover songs. These channels experienced a considerable boost in popularity after entering a competition hosted by fellow musician Jared Dines, ultimately emerging victorious.

=== Joining Tallah (2018–2019) ===
Tallah was formed in 2017 by drummer Max Portnoy, guitarist Derrick Schneider and bassist Andrew Cooper. Portnoy knew of Bonitz through the channel Hungry Lights, and asked his father Mike Portnoy to contact Bonitz for a place in the band. Bonitz has stated that he did not initially recognise Mike Portnoy. He officially became a member of the band on New Years' Day 2018.

On 18 July 2019, an incident at Lizard Lounge (Lancaster, Pennsylvania) unfolded where Bonitz attacked a member of security staff in self-defense, incorrectly believing them to be an aggressive fan of the band. The security guard apprehended Bonitz due to him hanging from a beam of the ceiling mid-performance. Bonitz continued to perform until being arrested in the middle of the set. Following the arrest, Bonitz was believed to have gone missing; it was later revealed that a miscommunication stated that he had been released whereas he had instead been transferred to another prison.

=== Tallah, Graystone and collaborations (2020–present) ===
Bonitz has also collaborated with several other musicians on YouTube outside of Tallah, such as providing vocals for a brief guitar cover of "Overconfidence" from Matriphagy by Andrea Boma Boccaruso, "Core Theater" by Jared Dines, and a cover of the Lil Pump song Pump Rock x Heavy Metal alongside Steve Terreberry.

In mid-2023, Bonitz was involved in a YouTube series called Musician Mansion, hosted by Jared Dines and Angel Vivaldi. 15 YouTube musicians (including Bonitz) were split into 3 5-piece bands and took part in various different musical and non-musical challenges over the period of a week. The series was filmed in a mansion just outside of Seattle (where the band and film crew lived during the week's filming) and in the city of Seattle itself. The 5 episodes of Musician Mansion were released on November 4, 2023.

As part of his time on Musician Mansion, Bonitz was put into the band Graystone along with Austin Dickey, Nik Nocturnal, Paula Carrageosa and Damien Ward. The band decided on a slam inspired deathcore sound, with Justin playing bass and performing secondary vocals. The band stayed together after they won at the end of the show, and released a studio version of the song they wrote for the contest ("Bleed the 5ifth") after the show was premiered. On 19 December 2023, Graystone released a cover of "Jingle Bell Rock" on that year's christmas, and a cover of the Ghostbusters theme on that year's halloween. In 2024 They then started releasing animal themed songs, with "Bock 22" being chicken themed and "S.O.S." being squirrel themed.

Graystone was brought back on the second season of Musician Mansion in 2024, airing on December 16th 2024. They returned this time as the reigning champions of the show and they wrote and released 3 songs within the show's new format, each one in only 24 hours. "Pond Shrieker", a frog themed song they released before the show aired, with no restrictions. "Rikki Tikki", a black metal song dedicated to participant of the show Rikki Thrash, with the requirements of featuring guitar harmony, a double kick chorus and each member's guitar playing in a different tuning. "Slam Dogs", a more Hardcore inspired dog themed song with participant of the show Kacey Foxx replacing Dickey on vocals, and an unreleased cover of "Headstrong" by Trapt. The band played their first live set at Chain Reaction in Anaheim as a part of the show's finale episode, and finished runner ups.

== Personal life ==
On October 14, 2024, while recovering from pneumonia, Bonitz was diagnosed with HIV, which he had unknowingly contracted from an ex-boyfriend. The medication for the virus soon led him to developing acute kidney injury and ulcerative proctitis.

== Discography ==
=== Beautifully Worthless Beings ===
Singles

- Give Me a Day (2018)

=== Call It Ego ===
Studio albums

- Back to the Old Way (2016)
- The New Elevator (2021)

=== From the Looks of Things ===
Studio albums

- The Summit (2017)
- Flicker (TBA)

=== Graystone ===
Singles

- Bleed The 5ifth (2023)
- Jingle Bells Rock (2023)
- Bock 22 (2024)
- S.O.S. (2024)
- Pond Shrieker (2024)
- Ghostbusters (2024)
- Rikki Tikki (2024)
- Slam Dogs (2025)
- Bree (2025)

=== Hungry Lights ===
Studio albums

- The Awry Ascent (2015)
- Heavy is the Crown (2016)
- Three Gods & Me (2017)
- Mudoo Ra (2019)
- Untitled Fifth and Final Album (TBA)

=== Otto Rocket & The Proamates ===
Studio albums

- Uncle Tito (2015)
- Elephant Seal (2017)

=== Prilly T ===
Studio albums

- Dear Rudiff (2017)
- Dear Rudiff 2 (TBA)

=== Snailfetus Kidney Sacrifice ===
Studio albums

- The Crawling (2016)

=== Tallah ===
Studio albums

- Matriphagy (2020)
- The Generation of Danger (2022)
- Primeval: Obsession // Detachment (2025)

Extended plays

- No One Should Read This (2018)
- Talladdin (2021)

Non-album, non-EP singles

- Gooba (2020)
- Vanilla Paste (2021)
- Hard Knock (2023)
