= All Smiles (Sworn In album) =

Studio album by Sworn In
- Released: June 30, 2017
- Genre: Nu metal; metalcore; emo; noisecore; dark ambient
- Length: 38:52
- Label: Fearless
- Producer: Kris Crummett

Sworn In chronology
The Lovers/The Devil (2015)	All Smiles (2017)

All Smiles is the third and final full-length album by metalcore band Sworn In. It was released via Fearless Records on 30 June 2017.

The record is the last to include vocalist Tyler Dennen, following his second leaving from the band, which occurred in June 2018 (almost a full year after this album's release).

== Sound ==
All Smiles is a notable departure from the band's "moshable" metalcore style that Sworn In were known for on their previous records. The album instead draws more on eccentric influences such as nu metal, noise and dark ambient.

== Track listing ==
No.	Title	Length
1.	"Make It Hurt"	3:43
2.	"Don't Look at Me"	3:19
3.	"All Smiles"	3:57
4.	"Helluputmethru"	3:34
5.	"Mirror Fear"	3:53
6.	"Puppeteer"	3:09
7.	"Cry Baby"	3:37
8.	"The Smiling Knife"	4:01
9.	"Dread All"	2:35
10.	"Closer to Me"	3:22
11.	"Cross My Heart"	3:42
Total length:		38:52

== Personnel ==
Sworn In

- Tyler Dennen – vocals
- Eugene Kamlyuk – guitar
- Derek Bolman – bass
- Chris George – drums

Production

- Kris Crummett
