= Errorzone =

Studio album by Vein
- Released: June 22, 2018
- Recorded: November 2017
- Studio: Graphic Nature Audio, Belleville, New Jersey
- Genre: Metalcore; hardcore punk; nu metal; mathcore; screamo
- Length: 27:46
- Label: Closed Casket Activities
- Producer: Will Putney

Vein chronology
| Self-Destruct (2017) | Errorzone (2018) | This World Is Going to Ruin You (2022) |

Singles from Errorzone
- 1. "Virus://Vibrance" Released: May 8, 2018; 2. "Demise Automation" Released: May 24, 2018; 3. "Doomtech" Released: June 5, 2018

Professional ratings
Review scores
| Source | Rating |
|---|---|
| Exclaim! | 8/10 |
| Pitchfork | 7.8/10 |
| PopMatters | 8/10 stars |
| Metal Injection | 9.5/10 |

Errorzone (stylized in all lowercase) is the debut studio album by American metalcore band Vein, which was released on June 22, 2018, through Closed Casket Activities. Noted by critics for taking influence from nu metal, mathcore, and screamo, the album has gained praise for its genre-bending style. To promote the record, music videos were produced for the tracks "Virus://Vibrance" and "Demise Automation". The album peaked at number 21 on the hard rock Billboard chart within its first week of release.

Demo versions of the tracks "Old Data in a Dead Machine", "Quitting Infinity", and "Untitled" were previously released as a free download on the group's Bandcamp page, but these were taken down as they were reworked for this record. The demos would later be included on the band's 2020 compilation album Old Data In A Dead Machine Vol. 1.

== Release ==
The band released the lead single from the album, "Virus://Vibrance" on May 8, 2018, and announced that the album would be out later that year via Closed Casket Activities On May 24, 2018, the band released the single "Demise Automation." The album's final single, "Doomtech" was released on June 5, 2018. On June 22, 2018, the album was released via Closed Casket Activities.

Music videos were made for the songs "Virus://Vibrance" and "Demise Automation".

== Reception ==
In both their early and finalized lists, Revolver named the album as among the best releases of 2018. Similarly, David Anthony and Alex McLevy named it as one of the best punk and hardcore albums of the year in an article written for The A.V. Club. Rolling Stone named it the sixth best metal album of 2018 in a year-end list. Writing for Exclaim!, Connor Atkinson describes the record as "an impressive and unique offering of screamo and 90s metalcore anguish" that "briefly loses sight of [Vein's] end-game about halfway through." The album would later be named Exclaim's Best Metal and Hardcore Album of 2018.

Metal Injection wrote "Hardcore, as stated at the beginning of this review, is often something that’s awash in reminisce. “Don’t forget your roots” is a phrase you never stop hearing. Vein is very much awash in nostalgia, but out of it, they pull something fresh and devastating. Errorzone is a rare kind of debut. It’s hardcore down to its marrow, but it’s got so much more to offer at every bone snapping turn." A reviewer from Punknews.org gave the album a 4.5/5 adding "the immediacy of the music presents itself as something unique and refreshing in a scene that had almost become stale once more. Vein are the ones now to carry the torch and showcase their brave cause to make interesting music again and Errorzone will not be forgotten for a long time."

Among other publications, Pitchfork writer Andy O'Conner pointed out the band's inclusions of stylistic elements associated with nu-metal and hardcore punk bands from the 1990s, describing it as "retro-futuristic". Errorzone has been described as nu metal, mathcore, metalcore, hardcore, and screamo.

=== Accolades ===
| Publication | Country | Accolade | Year | Rank |
|---|---|---|---|---|
| Stereogum | US | The Best Hardcore Albums Of 2018 | 2018 | 10 |
| Exclaim! | CAN | Top 10 Metal and Hardcore Albums of 2018 | 2018 | 1 |
| The A.V. Club | US | The Best Punk and Hardcore Albums of 2018 | 2018 | NR |
| Rolling Stone | US | 20 Best Metal Albums of 2018 | 2018 | 6 |
| Loudwire | US | 30 Best Metal Albums of 2018 | 2018 | 6 |
| Pitchfork | US | The Best Metal Albums of 2018 | 2018 | NR |
| Revolver | UK | 30 Best Albums of 2018 | 2018 | 2 |
| PopMatters | US | Best Metal Albums of 2018 | 2018 | 20 |

== Track listing ==
| No. | Title | Length |
|---|---|---|
| 1. | "Virus://Vibrance" | 2:24 |
| 2. | "Old Data in a Dead Machine" | 2:04 |
| 3. | "Rebirth Protocol" | 1:06 |
| 4. | "Broken Glass Complexion" | 2:26 |
| 5. | "Anesthesia" | 1:07 |
| 6. | "Demise Automation" | 1:48 |
| 7. | "Doomtech" | 4:46 |
| 8. | Untitled | 0:59 |
| 9. | "End Eternal" | 3:13 |
| 10. | "Errorzone" | 4:15 |
| 11. | "Quitting Infinity" | 3:19 |
| Total length: | | 27:46 |

Notes

- Track names are stylized in all lowercase.

== Personnel ==
Vein

- Anthony DiDio – vocals
- Matt Wood – drums
- Jeremy Martin – guitar
- Josh Butts – guitar
- Jon Lhaubouet – bass

Production

- Will Putney – engineering, mixing, mastering
