= Common Suffering =

Album by Harm's Way

Studio album by Harm's Way
- Released: September 29, 2023
- Studio: Studio 4, Pennsylvania
- Genre: Metalcore, industrial metal
- Length: 34:47
- Label: Metal Blade
- Producer: Will Yip

Harm's Way chronology
Posthuman (2018)	Common Suffering (2023)

Singles from Common Suffering
- 1. "Silent Wolf" Released: July 18, 2023; 2. "Devour" Released: August 16, 2023; 3. "Undertow" Released: September 7, 2023

Common Suffering is the fifth studio album by American hardcore band Harm's Way. It was released on September 29, 2023, through Metal Blade, as their first studio release in nearly five years.

== Background and singles ==
The record was produced by Will Yip at Studio 4 in Pennsylvania and features a guest appearance by King Woman. Thematically, the album explores personal struggles with mental health, relationships, politics, and corruption. Both "unrelenting brutality and quieter, reflective moments" act as mouthpieces for their topics. According to the band, the album title is a nod to the previous three years of "chaos, misanthropy, paranoia, disorder, confusion and anxiety". Guitarist Nick Gauthier revealed that the band did not want to "settle on parts" and double down on "too obvious" directions but instead worked on it until they became "creatively satisfied".

On July 18, 2023, the band announced the album and released the opening track "Silent Wolf", which talks about a growing distrust in "governing bodies and systems of power in our current cultural climate". On August 16, the band released the second single "Devour", a "pummeling whirlwind of blistering" about a toxic relationship and its aftermath. An accompanying tour through North America was announced the same day, starting on October 18. A third and final single "Undertow" featuring King Woman was released on September 7. The song looks at the "cycle of life and death" and the acceptance of the latter, as it brings people closer to "humility".

== Critical reception ==
Professional ratings
Review scores
Source	Rating
Metal.de	7/10

Jeanette Grönecke of Metal.de thought the band had not intended to deliver a "concept album" or changed up their ways all that much but still got the message across through their "brute" signature style.

== Track listing ==
All tracks are written by Harm's Way.

Common Suffering track listing
No.	Title	Length
1.	"Silent Wolf"	2:45
2.	"Denial"	3:03
3.	"Hollow Cry"	3:08
4.	"Devour"	2:40
5.	"Undertow" (featuring King Woman)	3:41
6.	"Heaven's Call"	4:03
7.	"Cyanide"	3:44
8.	"Terrorizer"	3:27
9.	"Sadist Guilt"	3:55
10.	"Wanderer"	4:21
Total length:		34:47
