= Strangers Only =

Studio album by My Ticket Home
- Released: September 3, 2013
- Recorded: March 2013
- Studio: Machine Shop Recordings
- Genres: Nu metal; metalcore
- Length: 33:50
- Label: Rise
- Producers: Will Putney; Randy Leboeuf

My Ticket Home chronology
To Create a Cure (2012)	Strangers Only (2013)	UnReal (2017)

Professional ratings
Review scores
Source	Rating
Dead Press	8/10

Strangers Only is the second studio album by American heavy metal band My Ticket Home. It was released on September 3, 2013, through Rise Records. The album's musical style is a drastic departure from the post-hardcore and metalcore sound of the band's previous releases, instead showcasing a nu metal sound with only some elements of metalcore. It was the band's final album with Rise Records, after the band left the label and would later sign with Spinefarm Records.

The album was influenced by hardcore punk, Underoath, Nirvana, Rage Against the Machine, Snot, Korn, Slipknot, Limp Bizkit, Linkin Park, Deftones and System of a Down.

== Track listing ==
No.	Title	Length
1.	"Spit Not Chewed"	3:22
2.	"Painfully Bored"	3:18
3.	"Hot Soap"	3:22
4.	"Teenage Cremation"	2:34
5.	"Keep Alone"	2:54
6.	"You All Know Better Than Me"	3:28
7.	"Head Change"	4:38
8.	"Foul Stench of Youth"	3:39
9.	"Ayahuasca"	3:26
10.	"Kick Rocks"	3:04

== Personnel ==
My Ticket Home

- Nick Giumenti – unclean vocals, bass; clean vocals on tracks 3 and 7
- Marshal Giumenti – drums, backing vocals
- Matt Gallucci – guitar, backing vocals
- Derek Blevins – guitar; clean vocals on tracks 3, 5, 6, 7, 8

Production

- Will Putney – producer, engineering, mastering, mixing
- Randy Leboeuf – producer, engineering, mastering, mixing
