= Matriphagy (album) =

- Pre-release cover

Studio album by Tallah
- Released: October 2, 2020
- Recorded: 2018–2020
- Genres: Nu metal; metalcore; alternative metal; rap metal
- Length: 52:58
- Label: Earache
- Producer: Josh Schroeder

Tallah chronology
No One Should Read This (2018)	Matriphagy (2020)	Talladdin (2021)

Tallah studio album chronology
Matriphagy (2020)	The Generation of Danger (2022)

Singles from Matriphagy
- 1. "The Silo" Released: June 5, 2020; 2. "We, the Sad" Released: July 2, 2020; 3. "Red Light" Released: July 23, 2020; 4. "Placenta" Released: August 6, 2020; 5. "Overconfidence" Released: August 20, 2020; 6. "L.E.D." Released: September 11, 2020; 7. "No One Should Read This" Released: October 15, 2020; 8. "Cottonmouth" Released: February 18, 2021

Matriphagy is the debut studio album by the American heavy metal band Tallah. The album contains all the songs from the band's debut EP, No One Should Read This, none of which were rerecorded. Instead, all five songs were remixed and remastered by producer Josh Schroeder to match the album's new songs. The album is considered to be an important step in the then-emerging fusion subgenre of nu metalcore.

== Concept ==
Matriphagy is a concept album which expands upon the story line of the band's debut EP, No One Should Read This, which was released two years prior. Named after a behaviour practiced by arthropods, focuses on a young man, Kungan, who lives alone with his elderly disabled mother, Tallah, in an underground bunker which is decorated as to resemble a normal home. Kungan has never seen the outside world due to the nature of his domicile, and Tallah is an overprotective and abusive maternal figure; these factors eventually drive Kungan insane, causing him to murder, dismember and eat his own mother. A track-by-track breakdown of the album by vocalist Justin Bonitz is available on the band's YouTube channel. On top of these two characters, a third is introduced in Lobifu, an evil stuffed toy rabbit, featured on the album cover, whose mere existence is debatable.

Bonitz has firmly stated that the storyline of Matriphagy is entirely disconnected from the storyline of their second album, The Generation of Danger; some small winks were intentionally included as Easter eggs, but any stronger connections between the two stories are not canonical.

== Cover art ==
The album artwork features several scattered pages from No One Should Read This (Kungan's journal), with Lobifu hanging on a chain in front.

Two versions of the album art appear to be in existence: the version shown in the infobox to the right uses the same sans-serif font for the band name and album title as the cover of No One Should Read This, with Lobifu taking up less room in the foreground. Physical and digital copies of the album have the band name handwritten and the album name written in a serif font, and a different foreground shot of Lobifu is used which shows less of the chain and is more zoomed into Lobifu himself. The background scene, aside from being less blurry, appears relatively unchanged in this version.

== Release ==
Announced on the fifth of June, 2020, On June 5, 2020, "The Silo" was released as the lead single. On July 2, 2020, We, the Sad, was released as the second single. Red Light was released on July 23, 2020, as the album's third single. On August 6, 2020, Placenta was released as the fourth single. On August 20, 2020, Overconfidence was released as the fifth single. L.E.D. was released as the album's sixth single on September 11, 2020. On October 15, 2020, the band released a music video for the seventh single, "No One Should Read This". On February 18, 2021, the band released a music video for the eighth and final single, "Cottonmouth".

== Composition ==
Released in 2020, the album is considered to be a cornerstone in the emerging nu metalcore fusion genre, which the band itself refers to as "nu-core". The album is most often considered to be a nu metal album, and has also been described as metalcore, alternative metal, rap metal, and deathcore.

== Reception ==
Professional ratings
Review scores
Source	Rating
Distorted Sound	8/10
Metal Hammer	4/5 stars
PopMatters	6/10
Sonic Perspectives	9/10
Wall of Sound	9/10

Matriphagy was released to critical acclaim, with several reviewers singling out the storyline, as well as drummer Max Portnoy's connection to his father Mike Portnoy. Graham Ray of Distorted Sound Mag wrote, "Tallah takes nu-metal to gruesome new heights on Matriphagy with its unsettling lyrical themes and crushing breakdowns." Ali Cooper of Metal Hammer stated that "Tallah’s shock-factor approach is already proving to be tremendous." Saby Reyes-Kulkarni of PopMatters stated that "while Matriphagy is hardly short on entertainment value, the band’s flair for theatricality and over-the-top emotionalism can only be endearing if you haven’t already heard the slew of bands that came before them." Writing for Sonic Perspectives, Samantha Buckman describes Portnoy's drumming on the album as "a unique balance of percussive daring and precision". Wall of Sound describes it as "a terrifying larger-than-life experience which transcends the merely musical."

== Track listing ==
Matriphagy track listing
No.	Title	Length
1.	"[redacted]"	1:12
2.	"No One Should Read This"	4:43
3.	"Kungan"	4:35
4.	"Overconfidence"	5:06
5.	"Placenta"	4:04
6.	"L.E.D."	4:16
7.	"The Silo"	4:47
8.	"We, the Sad"	5:00
9.	"Too Quick to Grieve"	6:00
10.	"Cottonmouth"	2:51
11.	"Murder Seed"	4:28
12.	"The Borderline of Pain"	0:48
13.	"Red Light"	5:08
Total length:		52:58

== Personnel ==
Tallah

- Justin Bonitz – vocals
- Derrick Schneider – lead guitar, rhythm guitar, backing vocals
- Alizé "Mewzen" Rodriguez – turntables, samples, keyboards
- Andrew Cooper – bass
- Max Portnoy – drums, percussion

Additional personnel

- Josh Schroeder – production, mixing, mastering, engineering
