= Vein.fm =

American metalcore band

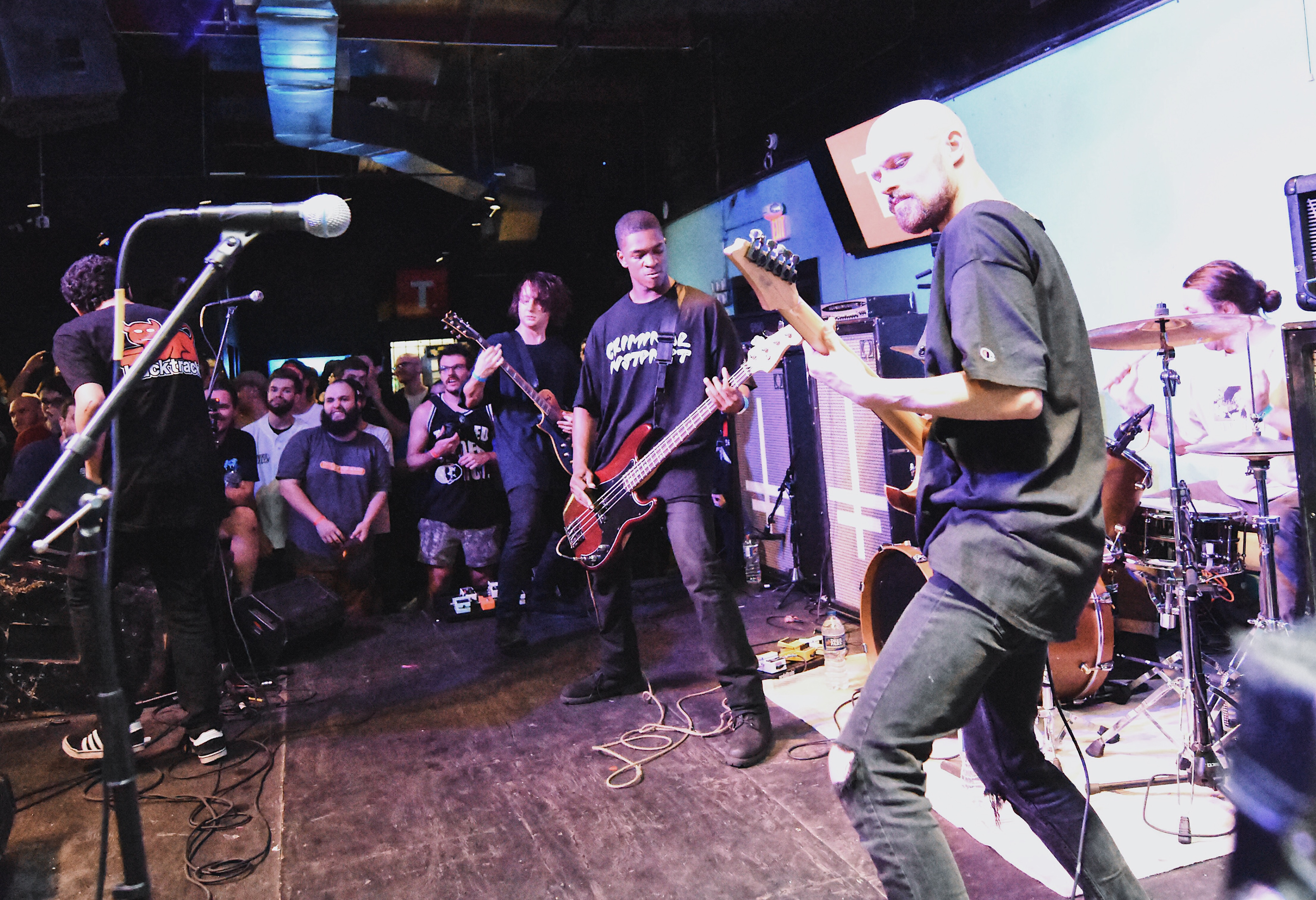
- Vein performing in 2017

Background information
- Also known as: Vein (2013–2020)
- Origin: Boston, Massachusetts, U.S.
- Genres: Metalcore; hardcore punk; mathcore; nu metal
- Years active: 2013–2024 (hiatus)
- Labels: Nuclear Blast; Closed Casket Activities; Threat Collective
- Spinoffs: Fleshwater, Venom Benzo, Living Weapon, No Souls Saved, Soaked in Disillusion
- Members: Anthony DiDio; Jeremy Martin; Jonathan Lhaubouet
- Past members: Sean Watson; Josh Butts; Benno Levine; Matt Wood
- Website: veintv.net

Vein.fm (formerly known as Vein) is an American metalcore band from Boston that formed in 2013. They are known for their frequent tours and have performed shows with groups such as Code Orange and Twitching Tongues while in Europe. In 2017 the band was signed onto Closed Casket Activities, who would issue their first full-length work Errorzone to positive reception among critics, even appearing on Revolver's early "Best Albums of 2018" list. The album also managed to peak at number 21 on Billboard's Hard Rock album chart. In July 2020, after the release of their remix album, the band announced it changed its name to Vein.fm.

== History ==
=== Formation and Demo/Terror's Realm (2013–2015) ===
In 2010, vocalist/bassist Anthony Didio and drummer Matt Wood were introduced by their sisters at a show in Haverhill, Massachusetts. The band formed in 2013 in the Merrimack Valley region of Massachusetts by guitarist Josh Butts, guitarist Jeremy Martin, vocalist/bassist Anthony DiDio, and drummer Matt Wood. The band released a self-titled demo in 2013.

The band played many local shows in the greater Boston area and started to gain traction. The band then self-released their debut EP Terrors Realm on June 4, 2015.

=== Self-Destruct and breakout success (2015–2017) ===
In 2016, the band supposedly self-released a physical only demo to send to record labels, this demo is currently unobtainable online. On January 6, 2017, they released a split with Virginia metalcore/screamo band .Gif from God.

Later that year, Vein signed to Closed Casket Activities and re-released their songs from the split as an EP titled Self-Destruct on August 15, 2017. That same year, the band played shows with Jesus Piece, Code Orange, and more. This included an appearance at Sound & Fury Fest as well as a breakout appearance at the 2017 edition of the This Is Hardcore fest in Philadelphia.

This was followed by a series of successful tours including a spot on the popular reoccurring Life & Death tour alongside No Warning, Backtrack, Twitching Tongues, and Higher Power.

=== Errorzone (2018–2019) ===
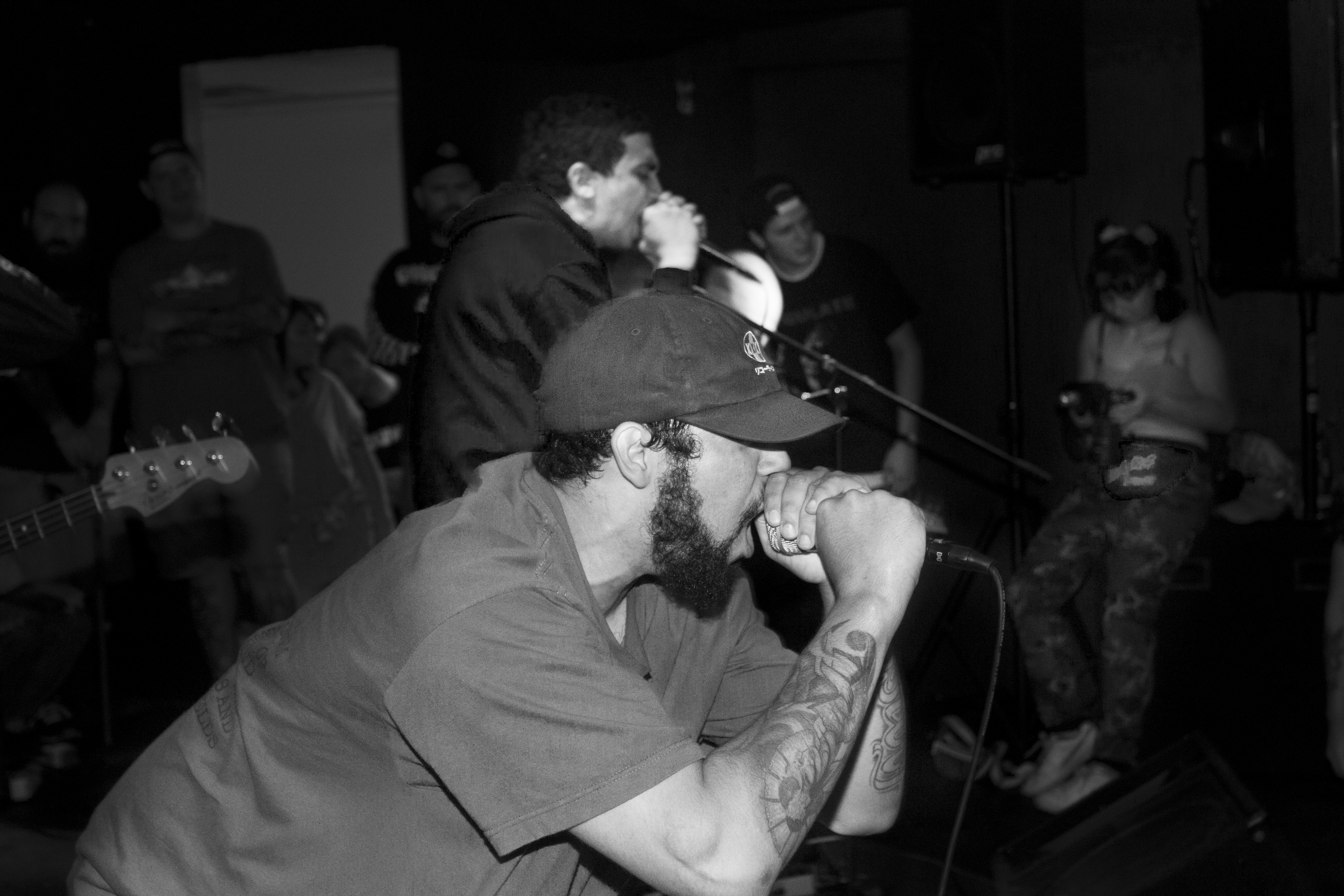
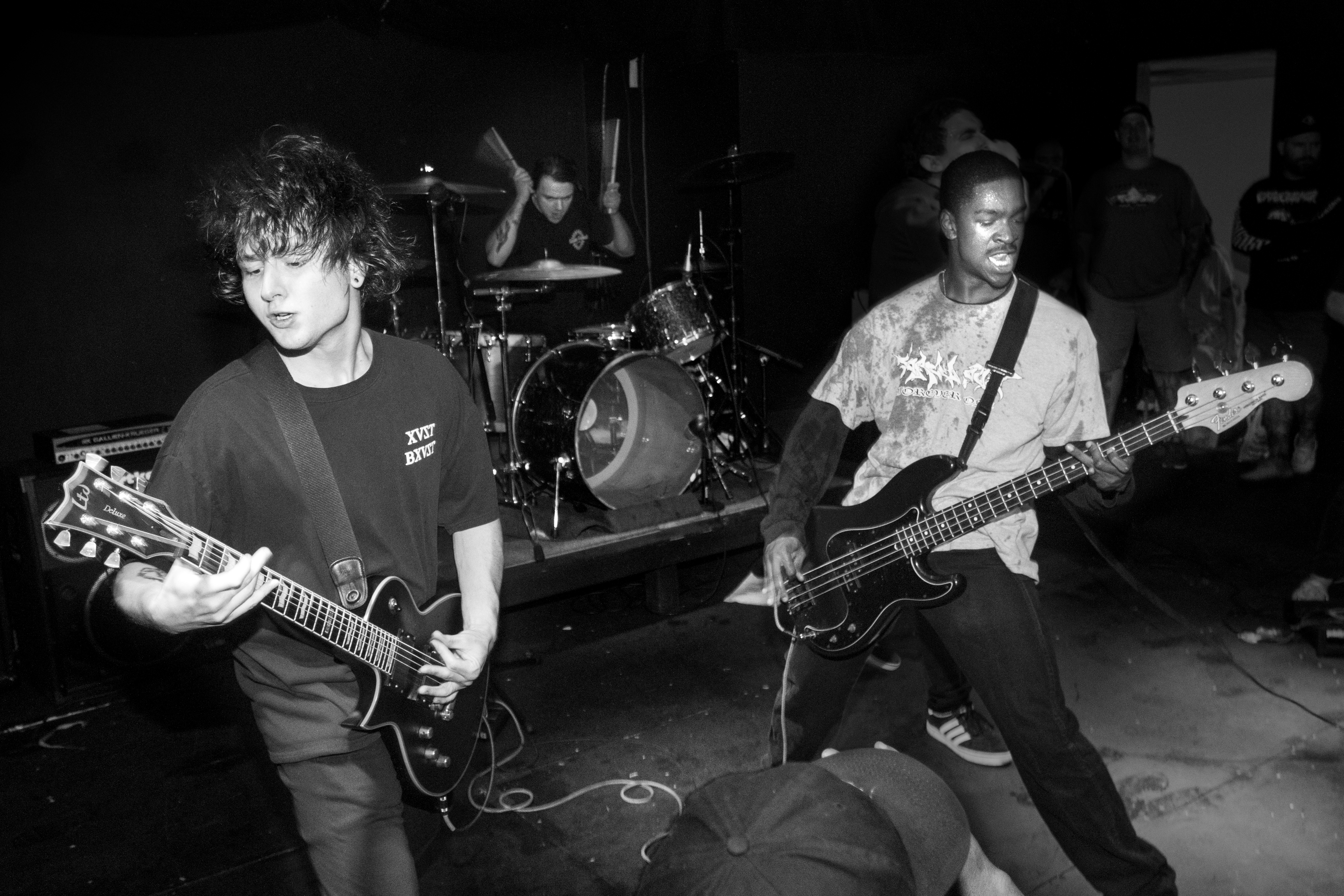
Vein in 2017

In early 2018, the band were given a supporting slot on some high profile tours, including a US tour with Harms Way alongside Ringworm and Queensway as well as another US tour supporting Code Orange alongside Twitching Tongues. This tour had support on select dates from Wicca Phase Springs Eternal, Ghostemane, Disembodied, Show Me the Body, Nicole Dollanganger, and Trail of Lies.

In May 2018, the band began teasing their debut studio album. On May 8, 2018, the band released the single, and accompanied music video for "Virus://Vibrance" and announced their debut album Errorzone would be out later that year via Closed Casket Activities. On May 24, 2018, the band released the single "Demise Automation." The album's final single, "Doomtech" was released on June 5, 2018. The band's debut album Errorzone was released on June 22, 2018, via Closed Casket Activities. The album was produced by Will Putney. The album was met with much praise from fans and critics alike. This was followed by the band announcing and embarking on their first full US headlining tour with support from Sanction, Fuming Mouth, and Judiciary.

On November 9, 2018, the band premiered the music video for "Demise Automation" and supported Every Time I Die's 20th Anniversary tour alongside Turnstile and Angel Dust. In 2019, due to the heavy use of experimental/electronic sounds on Errorzone, the band recruited disc jockey Benno Levine to join the band. In January 2019, the band embarked on their first UK headlining tour with support from Higher Power and Narrow Head. This was followed by the band's first-ever appearance in Japan supporting Crossfaith with Injury Reserve and Jin Dogg. The band's last headlining tour on the Errorzone touring cycle was in the US in Fall 2019 with support from Soft Kill and Higher Power with appearances on select dates from Modern Color, Dead Heat, Silenus, and Narrow Head.

=== Remix album and name change (2020–2021) ===
In January 2020, the band supported While She Sleeps and Every Time I Die on a UK/EU tour. On July 28, 2020, the band released the single and music video titled "20 seconds : 20 hours" this was a part of the surprise release of the remix album Old Data in a New Machine Vol. 1 the same day. The remix album included the new single, remixes, and demos of tracks off Errorzone, and remixed/remastered versions of three tracks from the band's debut EP Terrors Realm. The release of the remix album was accompanied by the announcement that the band had changed their name.

In November 2021, the band announced they would be embarking on a Spring 2022 US tour supporting Touché Amoré alongside Dogleg with Foxtails and Thirdface on select dates. Dogleg was later replaced by Militarie Gun due to Dogleg's disbandment amid abuse allegations. Foxtails was later removed from the tour due to allegations of abuse and replaced by Thirdface.

In December 2021, the band announced they would be headlining a benefit show for Mark Whelan of Fuming Mouth alongside Buried Dreams, Mizery, and High Command.

=== This World Is Going to Ruin You and hiatus (2022–2024) ===
On January 4, 2022, the band announced their second studio album, This World Is Going to Ruin You, set to be released on March 4, 2022, through Nuclear Blast. On January 5, the band released a new song, "The Killing Womb". On January 25, 2022, the band released the song "Fear In Non Fiction" featuring Geoff Rickly of Thursday. On February 15, 2022, the band released the album's third single, "Wavery". In June/July 2022, the band supported the album on a European headline tour with support from Drain and Higher Power. This was followed by US tour with support from Candy, Regulate, and Living Weapon.

In Spring 2023, the band supported City Morgue on their "Bloody America" US tour. They kicked off this tour by supporting Sunami on the Hingham, Massachusetts date of their US headlining tour. This was the final tour to feature founding member Matt Wood on drums. This was followed by another US tour supporting Hatebreed and Terror alongside Jesus Piece. The tour included an appearance at New England Metal & Hardcore Fest.

In April 2024, the band played the Sick New World fest in Las Vegas, Nevada. On May 16, 2024, the band played a surprise set on the Chicago date of Fleshwater's headlining tour. They also played a surprise set at the Kingston, NY day of said tour.

The band went on hiatus following Matt Wood's departure. The other three remaining members continue making music with Fleshwater, with Josian Omar Soto Ramos joining both bands to replace Wood.

== Musical style and influences ==
Vein have been categorized as metalcore, hardcore punk, mathcore, nu metal, and nu metalcore. They take influence from styles such as screamo, mathcore, drum and bass, nu metal, and horror soundtracks to films and games, with Errorzone especially noted for its grindcore, industrial, and nu metal influenced sound. Along with contemporaries Portrayal of Guilt and Infant Island, The Washington Post described them as delivering "new life" to screamo.

They have cited influences including Slipknot, Korn, the Silent Hill 2 soundtrack, Converge, Deftones, Botch, Jeromes Dream, Neil Perry, and Daughters.

== Side projects ==
In 2020, Anthony, Matt, Jeremy and vocalist Marisa Shirar, known by her stage name Mirsy, formed an alternative rock band called Fleshwater. The band released their demo on February 21, 2020. The demo was reissued later that year on cassette with a bonus track that was a cover of "Enjoy" by Bjork. The group would go on to release their debut LP We're Not Here to Be Loved on November 4, 2022.

As of 2020, Benno makes solo electronic/trip hop music under the name Venom Benzo. He self-released his debut EP Enclose and Illuminate on September 30, 2020. He released the single "Formative Rust" on December 20, 2020. On April 16, 2021, he self-released his second EP Fall to the Flow: Unredacted.

In 2021, Jeremy, Jon, Nick Hermann (drummer of Vomit Forth and Separated), and Justin Legere (guitarist of Laid 2 Rest) formed a mathcore band called Living Weapon. They released an EP titled Paradise which later was released on both CD and LP, and their debut album titled Death In The Family in 2026, both of which are released through Closed Casket Activities,

In 2022, Jon, along with members of Mindforce, Sanction, and All Out War, formed the band No Souls Saved and released a 2 song demo.

In 2024, former drummer Matt Wood formed the band Dream Fatigue and released The Lady In The Sky and No Requiem.

== Band members ==
=== Current members ===
- Anthony DiDio – lead vocals (2013–present), bass (2013–2016), samples (2022–present)
- Jeremy Martin – guitar, vocals (2013–present)
- Jon Lhaubouet – bass, backing vocals (2017–present)

=== Former members ===
- Josh Butts – guitar (2013–2021)
- Matt Wood – drums (2013–2023)
- Sean Watson – bass (2016–2017)
- Benno Levine – samples, turntables (2019–2022)

=== Touring members ===
- Josian Omar Soto Ramos – drums (2023–2024)

=== Former touring members ===
- Louis Hardy – guitar (2022)
- Nick Gauthier – guitar (2022–2023, 2024)
- Thomas Lovejoy – guitar (2023)

== Discography ==
Studio albums

- Errorzone (2018, Closed Casket Activities)
- This World Is Going to Ruin You (2022, Closed Casket Activities/Nuclear Blast)

Compilation albums

- Old Data in a New Machine Vol. 1 (2020, Closed Casket Activities)

Extended plays

- Vein (2013, Self-released)
- Terrors Realm (2014, Self-released) (Cassette edition issued by Threat Collection)
- Demo 2016 (2016, Self-released)
- A Release of Excess Flesh split 7-inch with .Gif from God (2016, Zegema Beach/Structures//Agony/Longrail/Dingleberry/Contrition)
- Self-Destruct 7-inch (2017, Closed Casket Activities)
- Vein on Audiotree Live (2018, Audiotree)

Music videos

- "Virus://Vibrance" (2018, directed by Eric Richter)
- "Demise Automation" (2018, directed by Eric Richter)
- "20 seconds : 20 hours" (2020)
- "The Killing Womb" (2022, directed by Max Moore)
- "Wavery" (2022, directed by Eric Richter)
- "Hellnight" (2022, Eric Richter)
