= Harm's Way (band) =

American hardcore punk band

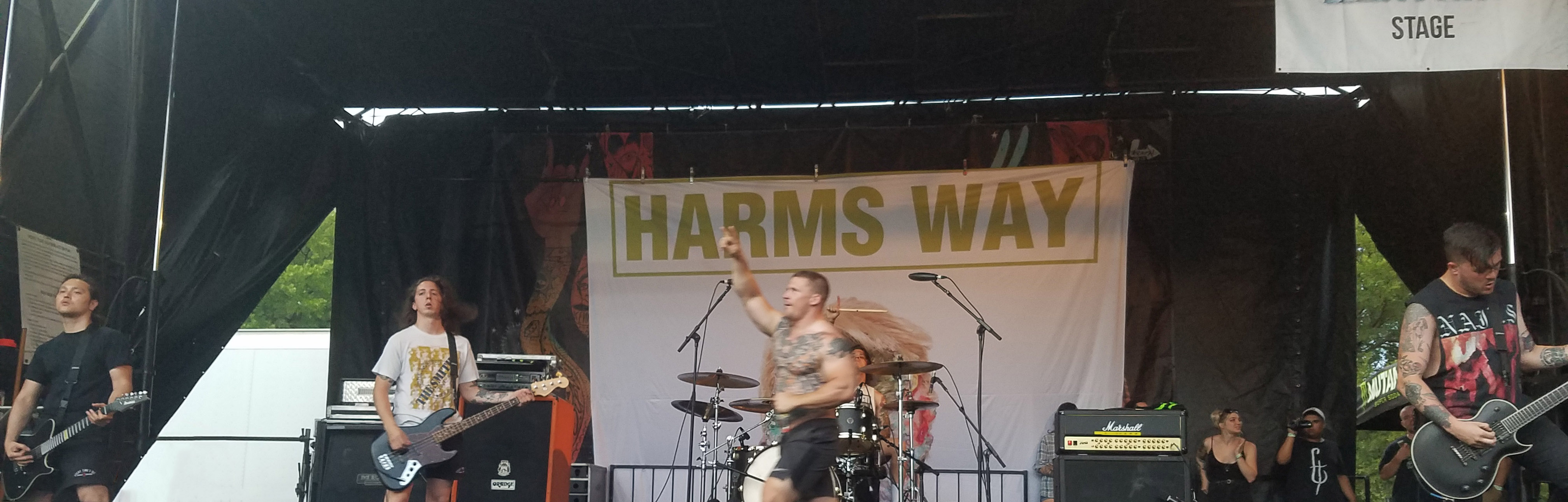
- Harm's Way performing in 2018

Background information
- Origin: Chicago, Illinois, U.S.
- Genres: Metalcore; hardcore punk; industrial metal; powerviolence (early)
- Years active: 2006–present
- Labels: Metal Blade; Deathwish
- Spinoffs: XweaponX; Few and the Proud; Wolfnote
- Members: James Pligge; Christopher Mills; Nick Gauthier; Casey Soyk
- Past members: John Hoffman; Andrew Saba; Dave Cronin; Jay Jancetic; Bo Lueders
- Website: harmsway13.com

Harm's Way (Note: The band often drops the apostrophe and present their name as HARMS WAY on album art, merchandise and other promotional materials for "aesthetic reasons".) is an American hardcore punk band from Chicago, Illinois, formed in 2006. The band started as a side project, but ended up becoming a more serious and full-time band in their later years. Harm's Way has since released four studio albums: Reality Approaches (2009), Isolation (2011) and Rust (2015) and several EPs. On February 9, 2018, the band released their critically acclaimed Metal Blade Records debut, titled Posthuman. They have been recognized for their unique blend of metal, industrial, and hardcore music.

== History ==
In 2006, the members of a straight edge punk band called Few and the Proud started a "side project-slash-joke" band to have fun playing short-and-fast powerviolence songs influenced by Crossed Out and Infest. Harm's Way drummer Chris Mills commented on the band's early days and progression, stating: "We'd play super fast powerviolence songs, and our singer would put on a mask and sing silly lyrics about beating up frat boys or whatever. Then, later as the band became more serious, we retired a lot of those elements and went in a more death metal direction—darker and less ridiculous, even if some aspects of it still weren't 100 percent serious." Harm's Way released several albums, EPs and singles through Organized Crime Records and Closed Casket Activities in their early days.

After the release of their 2011 second studio album Isolation, Harm's Way emailed Jacob Bannon (Converge) and his label Deathwish Inc. after hearing that he was a fan of the band's music to ask if the label would be interested in signing them. The band's signing to Deathwish was announced in March 2013. Harm's Way released the EP Blinded on July 23, 2013 featuring artwork by Florian Bertmer, and promoted it with a music video for the track "Mind Control" followed by a world tour. Mills commented on their positive relationship with the label, stating: "It's been awesome—they've been really helpful, we have a bigger budget, we were able to do a music video. They've been willing to do anything we've really wanted. They're really supportive." The Blinded EP also saw the band incorporating more Godflesh-influenced industrial metal into their sound. During the Summer of 2013, Harms Way went on an extensive European tour alongside Twitching Tongues. This was followed by a September US tour with Dead in the Dirt and Homewrecker serving as support.

In the Summer of 2014 Harms Way took part in the "Life & Death Tour" alongside acts such as Backtrack and Expire. On October 1, it was announced that the band had begun recording a follow up to their 2011 album Isolation. In February and March of 2015, Harms Way played multiple headling shows in both Australia and Japan.

Harm's Way released its third studio album Rust through Deathwish on March 10, 2015 and promoted it with a music video for the track "Amongst the Rust." Commenting on the band's musical and imagery changes with Rust, Mills said: "We're still locked into these niches in people's minds—you know, meathead tough guy hardcore band, Satan-worshipping death metal band, whatever. We see Rust as not just a new musical phase—we're changing up the old logo and taking a different direction with the imagery to try to steer people away from generalizations and assumptions based on stuff that really doesn't represent who we are as people or musicians." The album was met with generally positive reviews. Writing for Rock Sound, Chris Hidden gave the album an eight-out-of-ten, and said: "This new record finds them in formidable form, with the likes of 'Amongst The Rust' and 'Cancerous Ways' blending the down-tuned riff attack of nu metal with groove-led thrash and the crushing intensity of hardcore to produce a sound that references everyone from Sepultura to Trapped Under Ice." Harm's Way began touring in support of Rust with a March/April 2015 North American tour with Code Orange and others, a May/June European tour, the European leg of Deathwish Fest and US headlining tour in July, and touring North American with The Black Dahlia Murder in October. In November and December they toured the US with Twitching Tongues and Homewrecker.

In June 2016, Harms Way toured Europe, and in July they once again took part in the "Life & Death Tour" alongside Terror and Powertrip. On December 7, it was announced the band had signed a worldwide deal with Metal Blade Records.

In February 2017, Harms Way supported Every Time I Die on a North American tour alongside Knocked Loose. In October and November they supported Soulfly on multiple US dates. On December 6, 2017, the band announced their fourth studio album, and Metal Blade Records debut, titled Posthuman. The record was set for release on February 9, 2018, and was produced by Will Putney at Graphic Nature Audio. Luca Cimarusti wrote for the Chicago Reader, "they've finally fully realized their fascination with [Godflesh]. ...Posthuman is one of the darkest, heaviest records you'll hear this year." A year later, Harm's Way released a four-song EP titled PSTHMN featuring industrial remixes of songs from Posthuman.

The band embarked on a US headlining tour in February and March 2018, with Ringworm, Vein and Queensway serving as support. In August and September, Harms Way headlined a UK tour, During the Fall they supported Cannibal Corpse on a US tour.

During a show in Las Vegas, Nevada on September 27, Harms Way’s trailer featuring their gear and merch, totaling over $20,000 in value was stolen from the parking lot. Colin Young, the lead singer for Twitching Tongues, set up a GoFundMe campaign for the band to help them get back on their feet and continue touring. The goal of $25,000 was quickly reached with donations coming from, Corey Taylor of Slipknot, Hatebreed's Jamey Jasta and Fall Out Boy'sJoe Trohman.

In the Spring 2019, Harms way supported Knocked Loose on a US tour with The Acacia Strain, In August they headlined a short US tour alongside Jesus Piece, they then supported Ghostemane on a US tour in October and November.

After taking time off due to the COVID-19 Pandemic, Harms Way were scheduled to return touring early 2021, with a European tour alongside Madball and Knocked Loose however this tour got postponed. In December they supported The Acacia Strain and multiple US Dates.

On July 18, 2023, Harms Way released a single "Silent Wolf" and announced their fifth album Common Suffering which was released on September 29.The album was recorded alongside producer Will Yip at Studio 4 in Pennsylvania. To celebrate the album's release, the band held a hometown show at Metro in Chicago, Illinois on November 18, 2023. This show was part of their Fall tour North American tour in support of the album which was supported by Fleshwater, Ingrown, and Jivebomb. In the Summer 2024, Harms Way toured Europe for the first time in five years. During the Fall they supported Hatebreed on their 30th Anniversary North American Tour.

In February 2025, Harms Way toured Australia, they then supported Knocked Loose on a European tour. On May 6, the group released a two song EP Other World. This was followed by a co-headlining North American tour alongside Full of Hell.

Guitarist Bo Lueders died on April 2, 2026, aged 38. A memorial show for Lueders took place on August 29 at the Bohemian National Cemetery. Harms Way headlined the event and Twitching Tongues, Fleshwater, Haywire, Weekend Nachos and The Killer served as the opening acts.

== Musical style ==
The band's musical style has been described as metalcore and hardcore punk, Harms Way originally began as a powerviolence group. They also incorporate elements of groove metal, industrial, death metal, black metal, and nu metal into their sound. The band's music has been compared to bands like Code Orange, Slipknot, and Godflesh.

== Discography ==
=== Studio albums ===
- Reality Approaches (2009, Organized Crime)
- Isolation (2011, Closed Casket Activities)
- Rust (2015, Deathwish)
- Posthuman (2018, Metal Blade)
- Common Suffering (2023, Metal Blade)

=== Extended plays ===
- Imprisoned (2007, Organized Crime)
- Harm's Way (2008, Organized Crime)
- No Gods, No Masters (2010, Closed Casket Activities)
- Blinded (2013, Deathwish)
- PSTHMN (2019, Metal Blade)

=== Singles ===
- "Breeding Grounds" (2011, Closed Casket Activities)

=== Music videos ===
- "Mind Control" (2013)
- "Amongst the Rust" (2015)
- "Left to Disintegrate" (2015)
- "Become a Machine" (2018)
- "Silent Wolf" (2023)
- "Devour" (2023)
- “Undertow” (2023)
