= Currents (band) =

American metalcore band

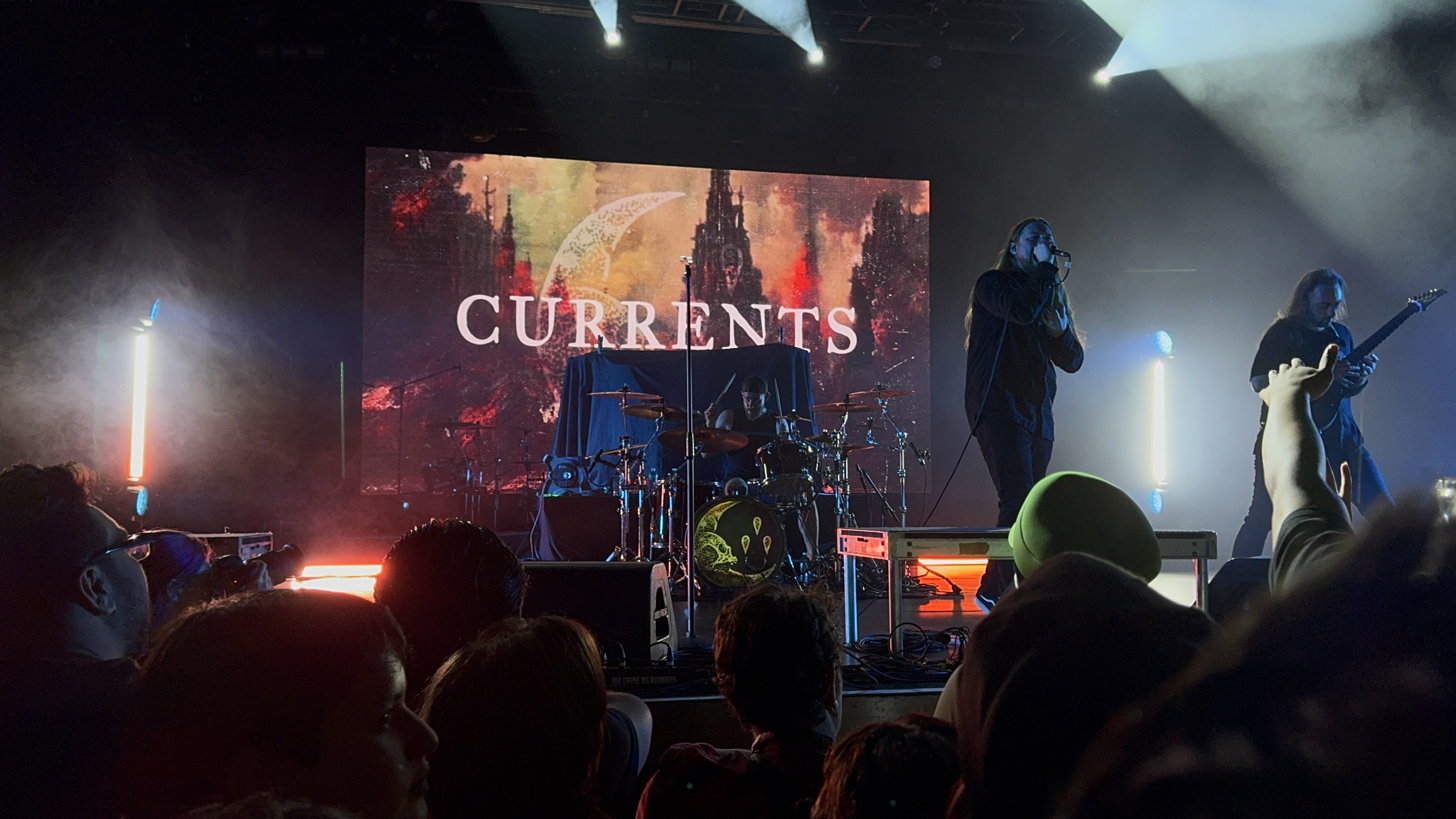
- Currents Performing at Palladium Times Square on July 24, 2025

Background information
- Origin: Newtown, Connecticut, U.S.
- Genres: Metalcore; progressive metalcore; djent
- Years active: 2011–present
- Labels: SharpTone; Rise
- Members: Brian Wille; Christian Pulgarin; Chris Wiseman; Matt Young; Ryan Castaldi
- Past members: Dee Cronkite; Jeff Brown; Chris Baradit; Patrizio Arpaia; Mitch Luboglio; Tim Marzik; Karl Kohler; Chris Segovia
- Website: currentsofficial.com

Currents is an American metalcore band formed in Newtown, Connecticut in 2011 by former drummer Jeff Brown. After numerous line-up changes, they currently consist of singer Brian Wille, guitarists Ryan Castaldi and Chris Wiseman (also the founding guitarist of Shadow of Intent), bassist and backing vocalist Christian Pulgarin, and drummer Matt Young. Since 2018, no original members remain with the band.

== History ==
In January 2013, the debut EP Victimized was released independently with five tracks on it. Two years later, on January 23, 2015, they released the EP Life // Lost, in which Ricky Armellino from This or the Apocalypse appears as a guest musician, which was also released independently.

At the beginning of March 2017, the band was signed by the US independent label SharpTone Records. On June 16 of the same year, the band's debut album, The Place I Feel Safest, was released via SharpTone Records. On May 4, 2018 the band released the instrumental version of the album. On December 14, 2018, Currents released their EP entitled I Let the Devil In through SharpTone Records; also included in the EP was the instrumental version of the EP.

On June 5, 2020, Currents released their second album, The Way It Ends through SharpTone Records. The album received positive reviews from critics. Kris Pugh of Distorted Sound Magazine applauded the band, saying: "At a time where there seems to be a new emerging modern metalcore band around every corner, CURRENTS have just gone a long way to making a lot of them feel somewhat irrelevant." On April 20, 2021, the band released the instrumental edition of the album.

On August 31, 2022, Currents released a new single "The Death We Seek". Through the late Summer of 2022, the band joined Miss May I on a North American tour with Kingdom of Giants and LANDMVRKS. On November 25, 2022, the band released another new single "Vengeance". On February 1, 2023, Currents released the third single "Remember Me", along with the announcement of their third album "The Death We Seek", to be released on May 5, 2023 via SharpTone Records. On March 29, the band released the album's fourth single "So Alone". Simultaneous with the album's release, the band released a new music video for "Unfamiliar".

On July 18, 2025, Currents released a new single "It Only Gets Darker". On October 31, the band surprise released their new EP All That Follows. In March and April of 2026, they are set to co-headline the Silence Follows Tour in the United States and Canada with ERRA, having AVIANA and Caskets as supporting acts. On September 18, 2026, the band once again surprised released a new EP Worlds Away, consisting of reimagined versions of tracks originally featured on The Way It Ends and The Death We Seek.

On October 30, 2026, Currents released a new single "Retributioner", and announced their fourth album Our Fates Lie in Tandem to be released on February 12, 2027, via Rise Records, the band's new label.

== Musical style ==
Currents has been categorized as metalcore and progressive metalcore, with influences of djent. According to Morten Wenzek of Metal Hammer Germany, the band "copied European djent well", referring to progenitors like Novelists and Loathe. Currents incorporate heavy riffs, breakdowns, djent guitars, and melodic rhythms, and singer Brian Wille alternates between clear and screaming vocals.

They have cited influences including Holding Absence, Acres, Balance and Composure, Defeater, Circa Survive, Thrice, Holy Fawn, Call It Home, Oathbreaker, Napoleon, The Ghost Inside, Volumes, Northlane, Humanity's Last Breath and Vildhjarta.

== Band members ==
Current

- Chris Wiseman – lead guitar, backing vocals (2014–present)
- Ryan Castaldi – rhythm guitar (2014–present)
- Brian Wille – vocals (2015–present)
- Matt Young – drums (2019–present)
- Christian Pulgarin – bass, backing vocals (2020–present)

Former

- Mitch Lobuglio – guitars (2011–2013)
- Chris Segovia – bass (2011–2013)
- Tim Marzik – guitars (2013–2014)
- Karl Kohler – bass (2013–2014)
- Patrizio Arpaia – vocals (2011–2015)
- Jeff Brown – drums (2011–2018)
- Dee Cronkite – bass (2014–2020)

Timeline

== Discography ==
Albums

- The Place I Feel Safest (2017, SharpTone)
- The Way It Ends (2020, SharpTone)
- The Death We Seek (2023, SharpTone)
- Our Fates Lie in Tandem (2027, Rise Records)

Extended Plays

- Victimized (2013, Self-released)
- Life // Lost (2015, Self-released)
- I Let the Devil In (2018, SharpTone)
- All That Follows (2025, SharpTone)
- Worlds Away (2026, SharpTone)

Singles

- "King of Catastrophe" (2011)
- "Anneliese" (2012)
- "Solace" (2012)
- "Sleep Paralysis" (2014)
- "Anneliese" (Re-vamped version) (2014)
- "Stillborn" (2014)
- "Withered" (2015)
- "Night Terrors" (2017)
- "Apnea" (2017)
- "Withered" (2017)
- "Into Despair" (2018)
- "Forever Marked" (2018)
- "Poverty of Self" (2019)
- "Second Skin" (2020)
- "A Flag to Wave" (2020)
- "Monsters (2020)
- "The Death We Seek" (2022)
- "Vengeance" (2022)
- "Remember Me" (2023)
- "So Alone" (2023)
- "It Only Gets Darker" (2025)
- "Bad Luck" (with We Came as Romans, feat. After the Burial) (2025)
- "Retributioner" (2026)
