= Good Things (music festival) =

Music festival in Australia

- Genre: Heavy metal, metalcore, alternative metal, alternative rock, and punk rock
- Dates: Early December
- Locations: Australia; Brisbane (2018–2019, 2022–); Sydney (2018–2019, 2022–); Melbourne (2018–2019, 2022–)
- Years active: 2018–2019; 2022–present
- Website: www.goodthingsfestival.com.au

Good Things is a music festival held in major cities around Australia. It features a number of international and Australian music acts, from various genres including rock, metal, punk, and emo.

== History ==
In early-2018, music tour organiser Destroy All Lines announced a new music festival, Good Things. It would become the biggest music festival held in Australia since Soundwave in 2015. The Good Things festival debuted in Melbourne, before playing at Sydney and Brisbane. On 19 November, the New South Wales Police Force issued a statement addressing accusations that they "made it impossible" for the Good Things festival to operate as all-ages in Sydney by imposing "multiple impediments" and charging "exorbitant" policing fees. The next day Destroy All Lines announced that the Sydney festival would no longer be an all-ages event, and it would restricted to 18-and-over. Under-age ticket holders for the Sydney festival were later contacted and given full refunds.

Two weeks before the first festival, Destroy All Lines announced that under-aged ticket holders would have to be accompanied by a responsible adult at the Melbourne festival. The move was met with outrage as festival-goers and parents alike described it as 'unfair'. The Brisbane festival had no restrictions and was an all-ages event. At the Sydney show, during Tonight Alive's set a 46-year-old security guard died due to a suspected heart attack.

Good Things confirmed via their Facebook page that they would be back to host a 2019 festival. On 19 August 2019, organisers announced the dates and venues for Good Things 2019. The Sydney venue was changed to Centennial Park to accommodate more people.

The 2020 festival was cancelled due to the then-ongoing outbreak of COVID-19. Dates were announced for the 2021 festival for 3–5 December in Melbourne, Sydney, and Brisbane. However the 2021 festival was also cancelled from an outbreak of the then-recent COVID-19 Omicron variant. Dates and the planned lineup still stand for the 2022 festival, which was announced alongside the former's cancellation.

== 2018 ==
2018 logo

The 2018 Good Things festival was headlined by The Offspring playing their 1994 album Smash in its entirety, and Stone Sour. The festival marked Babymetal's first Australian tour, welcoming one of the biggest crowds of the day.

The 2018 festival was sponsored by Nintendo Switch, Marshall Amplification, Vans, Uppercut Deluxe, Dangerfield, Jack Daniel's, Furphy Ale, Captain Morgan, and Smirnoff.

=== Locations ===
- Flemington Racecourse, Melbourne, 7 December 2018
- Parramatta Park, Sydney, 8 December 2018
- Brisbane Showgrounds, Brisbane, 9 December 2018

=== Lineup ===
- The Offspring (USA)
- Stone Sour (USA) Festival Exclusive
- All Time Low (USA)
- Dropkick Murphys (USA)
- Bullet for My Valentine (UK) Festival Exclusive
- The Used (USA)
- Babymetal (JPN) Festival Exclusive
- The Smith Street Band
- Dashboard Confessional (USA)
- Mayday Parade (USA)
- La Dispute (USA)
- Northlane
- The Wonder Years (USA)
- Waterparks (USA)
- Tonight Alive
- Scarlxrd (UK)
- Emmure (USA) Festival Exclusive
- Palaye Royale (USA)
- Make Them Suffer
- Waax
- Boston Manor (UK)
- Void of Vision
- Ecca Vandal
- Stuck Out (Melbourne only)
- RedHook (Sydney only)
- Stateside (Brisbane only)

== 2019 ==
2019 logo

=== Locations ===
- Flemington Racecourse, Melbourne, 6 December 2019
- Centennial Park, Sydney, 7 December 2019
- Brisbane Showgrounds, Brisbane, 8 December 2019

=== Lineup ===
- Parkway Drive
- A Day to Remember (USA) Festival Exclusive
- Violent Soho
- Simple Plan (CAN)
- Bad Religion (USA) Festival Exclusive
- Trivium (USA)
- Skegss
- Simple Creatures (USA)
- Karnivool
- The Butterfly Effect
- The Veronicas
- ~~Coheed And Cambria (USA)~~^{[A]}
- Falling in Reverse (USA) Festival Exclusive
- Enter Shikari (UK)
- Dance Gavin Dance (USA) Festival Exclusive
- Reel Big Fish (USA)
- Poppy (USA)
- Thy Art Is Murder
- Ice Nine Kills (USA)
- ~~The Damned Things (USA)~~^{[B]}
- Slowly Slowly
- Man with a Mission (JPN) Festival Exclusive
- The Bennies
- Voyager
- Yours Truly
- Windwaker
- The Beautiful Monument
- Gravemind

Notes

- A Coheed and Cambria withdrew from the lineup due to sudden health concerns with drummer Josh Eppard.
- B The Damned Things withdrew from the lineup due to scheduling conflicts.

== 2022 ==
The 2022 Good Things festival was headlined by Bring Me the Horizon, Deftones, and NOFX. The festival marked the reunions of TISM, who performed their first shows since 2004, and Kisschasy, who played their 2005 album United Paper People in full, their first live shows since 2015. NOFX also played their 1994 album Punk in Drublic in full. The festival marked the debut Australian concerts of Electric Callboy, Nova Twins, and Blood Command.

=== Locations ===
- Flemington Racecourse, Melbourne, 2 December 2022
- Centennial Park, Sydney, 3 December 2022
- Brisbane Showgrounds, Brisbane, 4 December 2022

=== Lineup ===
- Bring Me the Horizon (UK) Festival Exclusive
- Deftones (USA)
- NOFX (USA) Festival Exclusive
- TISM
- The Amity Affliction
- Gojira (FRA)
- One Ok Rock (JPN) Festival Exclusive
- Sabaton (SWE) Festival Exclusive
- Polaris
- Millencolin (SWE)

A-Z

- ~~3OH!3 (USA)~~^{[A]}
- Blood Command (NOR)
- Chasing Ghosts
- Cosmic Psychos
- Electric Callboy (GER)
- ~~Fever 333 (USA)~~^{[B]}
- Jinjer (UKR)
- ~~Jxdn (USA)~~^{[C]}
- Kisschasy
- Lacuna Coil (ITA)
- Nova Twins (UK)
- Ocean Grove
- Paledusk (JPN)
- RedHook
- Regurgitator
- Sleeping With Sirens (USA)
- Soulfly (USA)
- Teenage Joans
- The Gloom in the Corner
- The Story So Far (USA)
- Thornhill
- Those Who Dream
- To the Grave (Brisbane and Melbourne only)
- You Am I

Notes

- A3OH!3 withdrew from the lineup due to a dispute with promoters over their allocated set time and were replaced by Ocean Grove.
- BFever 333 withdrew from the lineup due to the sudden departure of several band members.
- CJxdn withdrew from the lineup for unknown reasons and was replaced by Teenage Joans.

== 2023 ==
The 2023 Good Things festival was headlined by Fall Out Boy, Limp Bizkit and Devo. The 2023 edition marked the debut Australian performances of Hanabie., Magnolia Park, Slaughter to Prevail, and Royal & the Serpent.

=== Locations ===
- Flemington Racecourse, Melbourne, 1 December 2023
- Centennial Park, Sydney, 2 December 2023
- Brisbane Showgrounds, Brisbane, 3 December 2023

=== Lineup ===
- Fall Out Boy (USA)^{[A]} Festival Exclusive
- Limp Bizkit (USA)
- Devo (USA)
- I Prevail (USA)
- Bullet for My Valentine (UK) Festival Exclusive
- Corey Taylor (USA)
- Pennywise (USA)
- Spiderbait
- Slowly Slowly
- Enter Shikari (UK)
- Behemoth (POL)
- Sepultura (BRA)
- Taking Back Sunday (USA)
- Pvris (USA)^{[B]}

A-Z

- Bloom
- Boom Crash Opera
- Eskimo Joe
- Frenzal Rhomb
- Hanabie. (JPN)
- Jebediah
- Luca Brasi
- Magnolia Park (USA)
- Make Them Suffer
- Ocean Sleeper
- Royal & the Serpent (USA)
- Short Stack
- Slaughter to Prevail (RUS)
- Stand Atlantic
- Tapestry
- The Local Romance (Brisbane Only)
- The Plot in You (USA)
- While She Sleeps (UK)

Notes

- AFall Out Boy's performance in Sydney was cut short due to an evacuation order caused by a thunderstorm warning.
- BPvris did not perform in Sydney due to illness.

== 2024 ==
The 2024 Good Things festival was headlined by Korn, Electric Callboy and Violent Femmes; Sum 41 were initially meant to play their final ever Australian shows, however they were forced to withdraw at the last minute due to Deryck Whibley contracting pneumonia. Killing Heidi also performed their 2000 album Reflector in full. The 2024 festival marked the debut Australian performances of From Ashes to New and Imminence; it also marked 311's first Australian tour since 1998.

=== Locations ===
- Flemington Racecourse, Melbourne, 6 December 2024
- Centennial Park, Sydney, 7 December 2024
- Brisbane Showgrounds, Brisbane, 8 December 2024

=== Lineup ===
- Korn (USA)
- ~~Sum 41 (CAN)~~^{[C]}
- Violent Femmes (USA)
- Electric Callboy (GER) Festival Exclusive
- Billy Corgan (USA) and The Delta Riggs^{[B]} Festival Exclusive
- Mastodon (USA)
- Kerry King (USA)
- The Gaslight Anthem (USA)
- Jet
- The Living End
- L7 (USA) Festival Exclusive
- Northlane
- Bowling for Soup (USA)
- Alpha Wolf
- Sleeping with Sirens (USA)
- The Butterfly Effect
- 311 (USA)

A-Z

- Alex Lahey
- AViVA (USA) Festival Exclusive
- ~~Destroy Boys (USA)~~^{[A]}
- Dragon
- Frank Turner and the Sleeping Souls (UK)
- From Ashes to New (USA)
- Grandson (USA/CAN)^{[D]}
- Highly Suspect (USA)
- Imminence (SWE)
- Killing Heidi
- Loathe (UK)
- Reliqa
- Taylor Acorn (USA)

Notes

- A Destroy Boys withdrew from the lineup due to unspecified reasons and were replaced by Alex Lahey
- B Billy Corgan cancelled his Australian sideshows due to scheduling issues and became a festival exclusive act
- C Sum 41 cancelled all their Australian shows at the last minute due to singer Deryck Whibley falling ill with pneumonia
- D Grandson's set in both Melbourne and Sydney were cut short due to technical issues

== 2025 ==
The 2025 Good Things festival was headlined by Tool, Weezer, and Garbage. It marked the final-ever Australian performances by Refused, as well as Cobra Starship's first Australian tour since 2012; Gwar also performed their first Australian shows since 2014. It also marked the debut Australian shows of Bad Nerves, Dead Poet Society, and Wargasm.

=== Locations ===
- Flemington Racecourse, Melbourne, 5 December 2025
- Sydney Showground, Sydney, 6 December 2025
- Brisbane Showgrounds, Brisbane, 7 December 2025

=== Lineup ===
- Tool (USA)
- Weezer (USA) Festival Exclusive
- Garbage (USA)
- All Time Low (USA)
- Machine Head (USA)
- ~~The All-American Rejects (USA)~~^{[A]}
- ~~Knocked Loose (USA)~~ ^{[B]}
- Lorna Shore (USA)
- Refused (SWE)
- New Found Glory (USA)
- ~~Alpha Wolf~~
- Thornhill^{[D]}
- Make Them Suffer
- Dayseeker (USA)
- Stand Atlantic
- James Reyne
- Kublai Khan (USA) Festival Exclusive
- Cobra Starship (USA)
- Goldfinger (USA)
- Tonight Alive

A-Z

- Bad Nerves (UK)
- Civic
- Dead Poet Society (USA)
- Fever 333 (USA)
- Gwar (USA)
- High Vis (UK)
- Inertia
- Maple's Pet Dinosaur
- Palaye Royale (USA) Festival Exclusive
- Scene Queen (USA)
- South Arcade (UK)
- Wargasm (UK)
- Windwaker
- Yours Truly

Notes

- A The All-American Rejects withdrew from the lineup due to a sudden family emergency and were replaced by Stand Atlantic
- B Knocked Loose withdrew from the lineup due to a sudden family emergency and were replaced by Alpha Wolf
- C Alpha Wolf were forced to withdraw from the lineup at the last minute due to a medical emergency and were replaced by Thornhill

== 2026 ==
The 2026 Good Things festival will be headlined by Limp Bizkit, Simple Plan, and Spiritbox. It will mark The All-American Rejects's first Australian tour since 2009; they were originally scheduled to perform the previous year but cancelled at the last minute due to a family emergency. MxPx will also mark their first Australian tour since 2013, and Ministry will play their final-ever Australian shows.

Two bands will also play full-album sets; Alexisonfire playing their 2006 album Crisis and Millencolin will play their 2000 album Pennybridge Pioneers.

The festival will also mark the first-ever Australian performances of All Them Witches, Future Palace, ivri, Kami Kehoe, LOCKED SHUT, LØLØ, and vianova.

=== Locations ===
- Flemington Racecourse, Melbourne. 4 December 2026
- Sydney Showground, Sydney, 5 December 2026
- Brisbane Showgrounds, Brisbane, 6 December 2026

=== Lineup ===
- Limp Bizkit (USA) Festival Exclusive
- Simple Plan (CAN) Festival Exclusive
- Spiritbox (CAN) Festival Exclusive
- Polaris
- The All-American Rejects (USA)
- Bad Religion (USA) Festival Exclusive
- Alexisonfire (CAN) Festival Exclusive
- Grinspoon
- Millencolin (SWE)
- Bilmuri (USA) Festival Exclusive
- Ministry (USA)
- Chad Gray (USA) Festival Exclusive
- MxPx (USA) Festival Exclusive
- Neck Deep (UK) Festival Exclusive
- Speed
- Slowly Slowly
- P.O.D. (USA)
- The Devil Wears Prada (USA)
- Choirboys

A-Z

- All Them Witches (USA)
- The Black Queen (USA)
- Future Palace (GER)
- Headwreck
- The Home Team (USA)
- House of Protection (USA)
- ivri (USA)
- Kami Kehoe (USA)
- LOCKED SHUT (USA)
- LØLØ (CAN)
- vianova (GER)
- Voice of Baceprot (IDN) Festival Exclusive
