= Dying Wish (band) =

American metalcore band

- Dying Wish at Hellfest, 2026

Background information
- Also known as: Trust Issues (2016-2017)
- Origin: Portland, Oregon, U.S.
- Genre: Melodic metalcore
- Years active: 2016–present
- Label: SharpTone
- Members: Emma Boster; Sam Reynolds; Pedro Carrillo; Jeff Yambra; Jon Mackey
- Past members: Andrew Le
- Website: dyingwishhc.bandcamp.com

Dying Wish is an American melodic metalcore band from Portland, Oregon, consisting of vocalist Emma Boster, guitarists Sam Reynolds and Pedro Carrillo, drummer Jeff Yambra and bassist Jon Mackey.

== History ==
Dying Wish was formed in 2016 originally under the name Trust Issues, with their debut EP Finding Peace in the Darkness, released on June 14, 2017. The name change to Dying Wish happened sometime 2018 with their self-titled demo. In 2019, the band released a song called "Enemies in Red", featuring Bryan Garris of the band Knocked Loose. In 2020, the band signed with SharpTone Records and released a new song titled "Innate Thirst". On July 7, 2021, the band announced plans to release their debut album, Fragments of a Bitter Memory. The album was released on October 1, 2021. In 2023, the band announced they were recording their second full-length album. The band released a single in 2023 called "Torn from Your Silhouette". The group released another song, "Watch My Promise Die", in July 2023, and announced their second full-length album alongside the song. The album, Symptoms of Survival, was released on November 3, 2023, through SharpTone. In August 2023, the band announced the, "Come and Be Killed by Dying Wish" tour, their first headlining tour in the United States, with support from Boundaries, Foreign Hands, Omerta, Excide, and Roman Candle. In October of 2024, they toured the United States on a co-headline tour with Pain of Truth. Beginning in April of 2025, they served as an opener for Spiritbox on their Tsunami Sea tour. Following a run of shows in Australia supporting Counterparts, the band announced their third studio album Flesh Stays Together. The album released on September 26, 2025.

== Members ==
Current

- Emma Boster – lead vocals (2016–present)
- Pedro Carrillo – guitar, backing vocals (2016–present)
- Sam Reynolds – guitar, backing vocals (2016–present)
- Jeff Yambra – drums (2016–present)
- Jon Mackey – bass, backing vocals (2022–present)

Former

- Andrew Le – bass (2016–2022)

== Discography ==
=== Studio albums ===
- Fragments of a Bitter Memory (2021)
- Symptoms of Survival (2023)
- Flesh Stays Together (2025)

=== Extended plays ===
- Finding Peace in the Darkness (2017)
- Dying Wish (2018)
- Split (with Serration) (2018)
- From Nothing (2024)

=== Singles ===
Year	Song	Album
2019	"Enemies in Red"	Fragments of a Bitter Memory
2020	"Innate Thirst"	Fragments of a Bitter Memory
2021	"Fragments of a Bitter Memory"	Fragments of a Bitter Memory
2023	"Torn from Your Silhouette"	Symptoms of Survival
2025	"I Brought You My Soul (Your World Brought Me Despair)"	Non-album single
2025	"I'll Know You're Not Around"	Flesh Stays Together
2025	"Revenge In Carnage"	Flesh Stays Together

== Videography ==
Year	Song	Director
2020	"Innate Thirst"	Karl Whinnery
2021	"Until Mourning Comes"	Errick Easterday
2021	"Fragments of a Bitter Memory"	Errick Easterday
2021	"Cowards Feed, Cowards Bleed"	Errick Easterday
2022	"Now You'll Rot"	Anthony Altamura
2023	"Torn from Your Silhouette"	Anthony Altamura
2023	"Watch My Promise Die"	Anthony Altamura
2023	"Lost in the Fall"	Anthony Altamura
2023	"Path to Your Grave"	Anthony Altamura
2023	"Paved in Sorrow"	Anthony Altamura
2025	"I'll Know You're Not Around"	Eric Richter & Pedro Carrillo
