= Pridelands =

Australian progressive metal band

- Origin: Mount Gambier, Australia
- Genres: Alternative metal, metalcore
- Years active: 2013-present
- Labels: Resist, SharpTone
- Members: Mason Bunt; Joshua Cory; Liam Fowler; Daniel 'Deej' Lohrey; Joe Lipsham
- Website: https://www.pridelandsofficial.com

Pridelands are an Australian rock band, from Mount Gambier, Australia. The band's current lineup consists of original members Mason Bunt (scream vocalist), lead guitarist Liam Fowler, and clean vocalist Joshua Cory. Following Cory's transition from bassist duties, the band was joined by Daniel Lohrey and drummer Joe Lipsham. Currently residing in Melbourne, Australia, the band signed with Resist and SharpTone records in 2021.

== History ==
The band released their debut single "Gaia" in October 2013.

The band released their debut EP Natives in 2015. They released their second EP, Any Colour You Desire in May 2018. The EP was launched at The Workers Club in Melbourne.

In January 2022, Pridelands released their debut studio album, Light Bends. On the new record, Pridelands drummer Joe Lipsham said, "As we went into the studio to record our debut record, we were eager to take a risk in how we wanted it to sound. We aimed to create 11 stylistically very different tracks, each one written using a different writing style to the previous. We wanted a record that felt like you aren't listening to the same song twice; a record whereas all the tracks sit together, it becomes a cohesive yet ever-changing journey for the listener. And we feel we achieved more than we had hoped for with Light Bends."

== Discography ==
=== Studio albums ===
List of albums, with release date and label shown
Title	Details	Peak chart positions	
Title	Details	AUS	AUS Artists
Light Bends	Released: 14 January 2022; Label: Resist (RES193); Formats: CD, LP digital download, streaming; Tracklisting: 1. I Reach into Your Heart; 2. The Walls; 3. Parallel Lines; 4. Parted Time; 5. The Lake of Twisted Limbs; 6. Safer Here; 7. Heavy Tongue; 8. Antipathy; 9. Translucent Blues; 10. Evergrowth; 11. The Sun Will Find Us	79	10

=== Extended plays ===
List of self-released EPs, with release date shown
Title	Details
Natives	Released: 19 February 2015; Formats: Digital download, streaming; Tracklisting: 1. The Inkwell; 2. Contingency; 3. Devil's Snare; 4. Destitute; 5. Coffinbound
Any Colour You Desire	Released: 4 May 2018; Formats: Digital download, streaming; Tracklisting: 1. Any Colour You Desire; 2. Boys; 3. Black Lung; 4. Slowly; 5. Machina; 6. The Sulfur Inside Your Hell

Singles

- "Gaia" (2013)
- "Coalesce" (2016)
- "Battery City" (2016)
- "Machina" (2018)
- "Any Colour You Desire" (2018)
- "Dark Sources" (2019)
- "Heavy Tongue" (2021)
- "The Walls" (2021)
- "The Lake of Twisted Limbs" (2021)
