= Chapter 4: Red Falcon Super Battle! Neo Paris War!! =

Chapter 04: Red Falcon Super Battle! Neo Paris War!!

Studio album by Rise of the Northstar
- Released: November 14, 2025
- Genres: Metalcore, nu metal, rap metal, heavy hardcore
- Length: 38:28
- Label: Kuromaku Corp

Rise of the Northstar chronology
Showdown (2023)	Chapter 04: Red Falcon Super Battle! Neo Paris War!! (2025)

Chapter 04: Red Falcon Super Battle! Neo Paris War!! is the fourth studio album by the French heavy metal and hardcore punk band Rise of the Northstar. It was released on November 14, 2025, through Kuromaku Corp records.

== Overview ==
Rise of the Northstar began writing the album in 2024 while on tour for their previous album Showdown. The process started with lead guitarist Eva-B sending songs to vocalist Vitia, the two then continued to swap ideas and lyrics back and forth before eventually bringing their ideas to the rest of the band. Vitia stated from here “each member added their own flavor here and there.”

The band announced the album on September 4, 2025, in a statement the band claimed their aim with this record was “to surprise our audience while sticking to our DNA, by bringing something new without crucifying the old. The era of Shogun No Shi is over, please welcome the super Mecha Falcon, symbol of modernisation of content and form, from the writing to the sound — Northstar is coming back!”

On the change in direction the bands lead guitarist Eva-B stated:

This album, compared to the older ones, we had it sound really modern. It’s got more range, and there’s more hip hop/urban. There’s this big mix, and we’ve had it for quite a long time, but it’s stronger now.

Vithia claimed a big inspiration on this album was both the manga and the 1988 film versions of Akira. The album also features two collaborations with Landmvrks and Aaron Matts of ten56.’.

3 music videos were produced for the songs “Neon Paris”, “Falcon” and “Back to Basics”. For the first time the band put some animated visuals in videos for “Falcon” and “Neo Paris” in collaboration with a company called Hotu. “Neo Paris” won best audio/visual creation at the inaugural French Metal Awards.

== Cover art ==
The cover art which was designed by the bands lead singer Vithia, is a Japanese mecha. He stated “I had never challenged myself to draw a Mecha before, which for us the band, symbolizes a kind of modernity.” He used manga like Mobile Fighter G Gundam, Mobile Suit Gundam, Macross and Patlabor for inspiration.

Professional ratings
Review scores
Source	Rating
Kerrang!	3/5 stars
GBHBL	7.5/10
Soundboard	Favorable

== Critical reception ==
Sam Law of Kerrang! wrote “At its blockheaded best, it’s brilliant. Ultra-speedy single Falcon, for instance, feels like the sort of banger a 15-year-old might write with the benefit of a big budget and decades of earned experience.”

Carl Fisher of GBHBL added “It’s all really enjoyable stuff, provided you can look past the familiarity of a lot of it.”

== Track listing ==
All tracks are written by Jack Kelly, except where noted.

No.	Title	Length
1.	"Turbo-Intro"	1:28
2.	"Payback"	3:35
3.	"Neo Paris"	3:21
4.	"Falcon"	3:51
5.	"Back 2 Basics" (featuring Landmvrks)	3:48
6.	"Under"	1:09
7.	"Pressure"	2:34
8.	"Nemesis"	2:31
9.	"A.I.R. Max"	3:15
10.	"Solitary Homeboy"	3:24
11.	"No Turing Back"	3:23
12.	"Desolation Hawk"	3:19
13.	"75 Outro"	2:47
Total length:		38:38

== Personnel ==
Rise of the Northstar

- Victor "Vithia" Leroy – lead vocals
- Brice "Eva-B" Gauthier – guitar
- Erwan "Air One" Menez – rhythm guitar
- Alexis "Yoru" Lieu – bass guitar
- Kevin "Phantom" Foley – drums

== Charts ==
Chart (2025)	Peak position
French Charts (SNEP)	137
French Rock & Metal Albums (SNEP)	9
