= The Legacy of Shi =

Studio album by Rise of the Northstar
- Released: October 19, 2018
- Recorded: Silver Cord Studios
- Genres: Metalcore; nu metal; groove metal; rap metal; heavy hardcore
- Length: 43:31
- Labels: Nuclear Blast; SharpTone
- Producers: Rise of the Northstar; Joe Duplantier

Rise of the Northstar chronology
Welcame (2014)	The Legacy of Shi (2018)	Showdown (2023)

The Legacy of Shi is the second studio album from French heavy metal and hardcore punk band Rise of the Northstar. It was released on October 19, 2018, through SharpTone Records in the United States, and everywhere else on Nuclear Blast. The album was co-produced by Rise of the Northstar and Joe Duplantier of Gojira.

== Background and musical style ==
According to lead guitarist Evangelion-B, the album tells the story of a Japanese spirit yōkai who possess and fight the band throughout 11 tracks. In the album, they used seven strings for the first time on half of the album, with a very low tuning, and mixed more musical styles into the album. Two music videos were made for the songs "Here Comes the Boom" and the title track.

Scott Bolton of Rough Edge stated the album is “ten tracks of pounding guitar, rap-style vocals and some real imagination.” He also mentioned how the record also features some “crushingly heavy tracks” such as “Kozo”. The album also features some fast songs like “This is Crossover”. He also claimed the song “Teenage Rage” has a Beastie Boys type sound.

== Critical reception ==
Professional ratings
Review scores
Source	Rating
Discovered Magazine	7/10
Distorted Sound	8/10
Metal.de	8/10
Metal Hammer	70/100
Punknews.org	4.5/5 stars
SoundBoard	7/10

The album has been generally given positive reviews.

Punknews.org writer Michael Hawkins praised the album as a whole by saying "Northstar have lost none of their impact, only reinforced it. This time around, the record feels more like a whole, something to be experienced from beginning to end. Vocalist Vithia echoes this in his lyrics, a concept album story of becoming possessed by a Japanese demon, or yōkai." He concludes in his review "The Legacy of Shi is a monumental achievement for Rise of the Northstar – one that's made even more impressive by the band's drive to create music on their own terms. This feeling of victory is a palpable one, present on every track of the album. I think the chant throughout "This Is Crossover" sums Rise of the Northstar's attitude up perfectly: This is crossover. Northstar FOREVER." Jeffry Maki of distorted sound also gave the album praise stating “Rise of the NorthStar certainly “Demonstrate Their Style” on “The Legacy of Shi,” and no, they “Ain’t Nuthing ta Fuck Wit” either.” Luke Nuttall of Sound Board claimed “It makes for an album that’s pretty difficult to criticise too harshly, all things considered. There are glaring flaws all over the place, but Rise Of The Northstar’s enormous presence vastly overshadows them to the point where this is a far more enjoyable listen than it would be otherwise.”

== Track listing ==
All lyrics are written by Vithia; all music is composed by Eva-B, Air One.

No.	Title	Length
1.	"The Awakening" (featuring Shino)	2:38
2.	"Here Comes the Boom"	4:11
3.	"Nekketsu"	3:11
4.	"Kozo"	5:01
5.	"Teenage Rage"	3:46
6.	"Step By Step"	5:27
7.	"This Is Crossover"	4:17
8.	"Cold Truth"	4:36
9.	"All For One"	2:54
10.	"Furyo's Day"	4:03
11.	"The Legacy of Shi"	3:22
Total length:		43:31

== Personnel ==
Adapted from the liner notes of The Legacy of Shi.

Rise of the Northstar

- Vithia – vocals
- Eva-B – lead guitar
- Air One – rhythm guitar
- Fabulous Fab – bass guitar
- Phantom – drums

Production

- Joe Duplantier – recorded by, producer, engineer
- Rise of the Northstar – producer, engineer
- Jami Uertz – recorded by, engineer
- Johann Meyer – recorded by, engineer, mixer
- Vithia – art direction, design, layout
- Ted Jensen – mastering engineer

== Charts ==
Chart (2018)	Peak position
French Albums (SNEP)	82
German Albums (Offizielle Top 100)	32
Swiss Albums (Schweizer Hitparade)	81
UK Independent Album Breakers (OCC)	20
UK Rock & Metal Albums (OCC)	32
