= Rise of the Northstar =

French metal/hardcore band

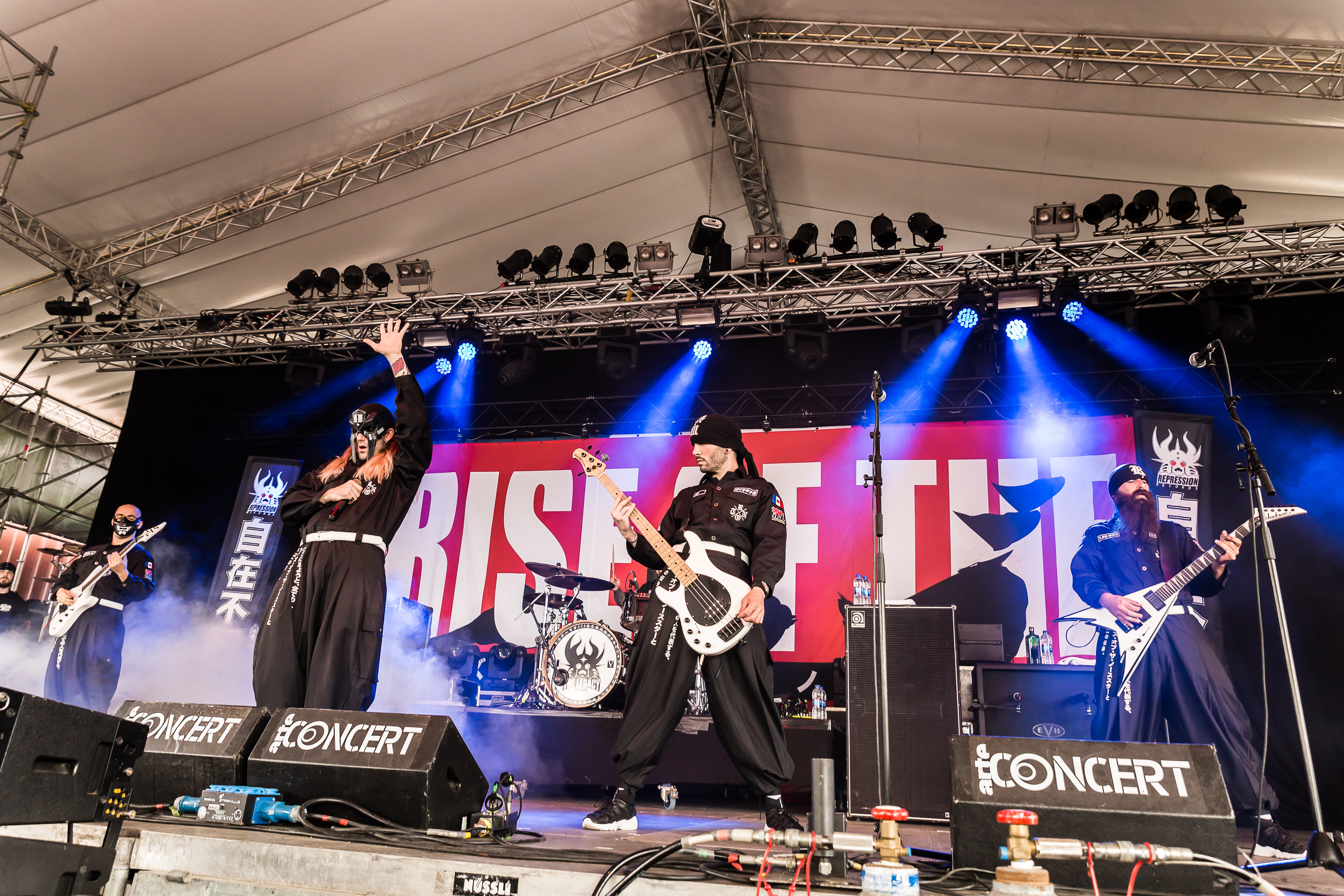
- Rise of the Northstar performing at With Full Force in Germany, 2018.

Background information
- Also known as: ROTNS
- Origin: Paris, France
- Genres: Metalcore; hardcore punk; crossover thrash; groove metal; rap metal
- Years active: 2008–present (hiatus in 2022)
- Labels: Nuclear Blast; SharpTone; Atomic Fire; Reigning Phoenix
- Members: Vithia; Eva-B; Air One; Yoru; Phantom
- Past members: Nicolas "Diego" Leroy; Max V.; Loïc "Bboy" Ghanem; Lucas; Hokuto no Kev; Fabulous Fab; Phantom
- Website: www.rotnsofficial.com

Rise of the Northstar (abbreviated as ROTNS) is a French heavy metal band from Paris. Formed in 2008, the band combines heavy metal, hip-hop, and hardcore punk with Japanese pop culture influences. The band currently consists of vocalist Vithia, lead guitarist Eva-B, rhythm guitarist Air One, bassist Yoru, and drummer Phantom with Vithia being the sole original member of the group. Rise of the Northstar has released two EPs, Tokyo Assault (2010) and Demonstrating My Saiya Style (2012), and four full-length albums, Welcame (2014), The Legacy of Shi (2018), Showdown (2023) and Chapter 4: Red Falcon Super Battle! Neo Paris War!! (2025).

== History ==
=== 2008–2010: Beginnings and Tokyo Assault ===
Rise of the Northstar was founded by vocalist Vithia in Paris, 2008. The band's name was inspired by the manga Fist of the North Star (北斗の拳 Hokuto no Ken). The original line-up consisted of Vithia on vocals, Nicolas "Diego" L. on lead guitar, Loïc "Bboy" Ghanem on rhythm guitar, Lucas on bass, and Max V on drums. In the summer of 2008, the band released a demo containing two tracks on their Myspace. In 2009, they recorded three more tracks for five days at the Studio Sainte-Marthe in Paris, and released them on January 12, 2010 along with the two tracks of the demo as their first EP titled Tokyo Assault. In the summer of 2010, lead guitarist Nicolas "Diego" L. and drummer Max V left the band and were replaced respectively by Eva-B and Hokuto no Kev.

=== 2011–2012: Demonstrating My Saiya Style ===
In May 2011, Rise of the Northstar launched "Protect Your Japan" campaign following the 2011 Tōhoku earthquake and tsunami and Fukushima nuclear disaster that affected Japan on March 11 of the same year. They released an exclusive song titled "Phoenix" on June 20, 2011 on their bandcamp page to raise fund for the Japanese Red Cross. The band also made a video clip to make the campaign bigger. Shortly after, a new rhythm guitarist Air One joined the band to replace Loïc G who had left a few months earlier.

On July 23, 2012, the band released a second EP containing six tracks titled Demonstrating My Saiya Style. The EP was released as a single CD for the world, and as a special Japanese 2 CDs pack (including the new EP and Tokyo Assault) independently, and had sold out the first 2,000 copies. Two music videos were released from the EP: "Sound of Wolves" and the eponymous "Demonstrating My Saiya Style". Throughout 2012 the band did a mini Portugal/Spain tour along with a separate Japan tour.

=== 2013–2016: Welcame ===
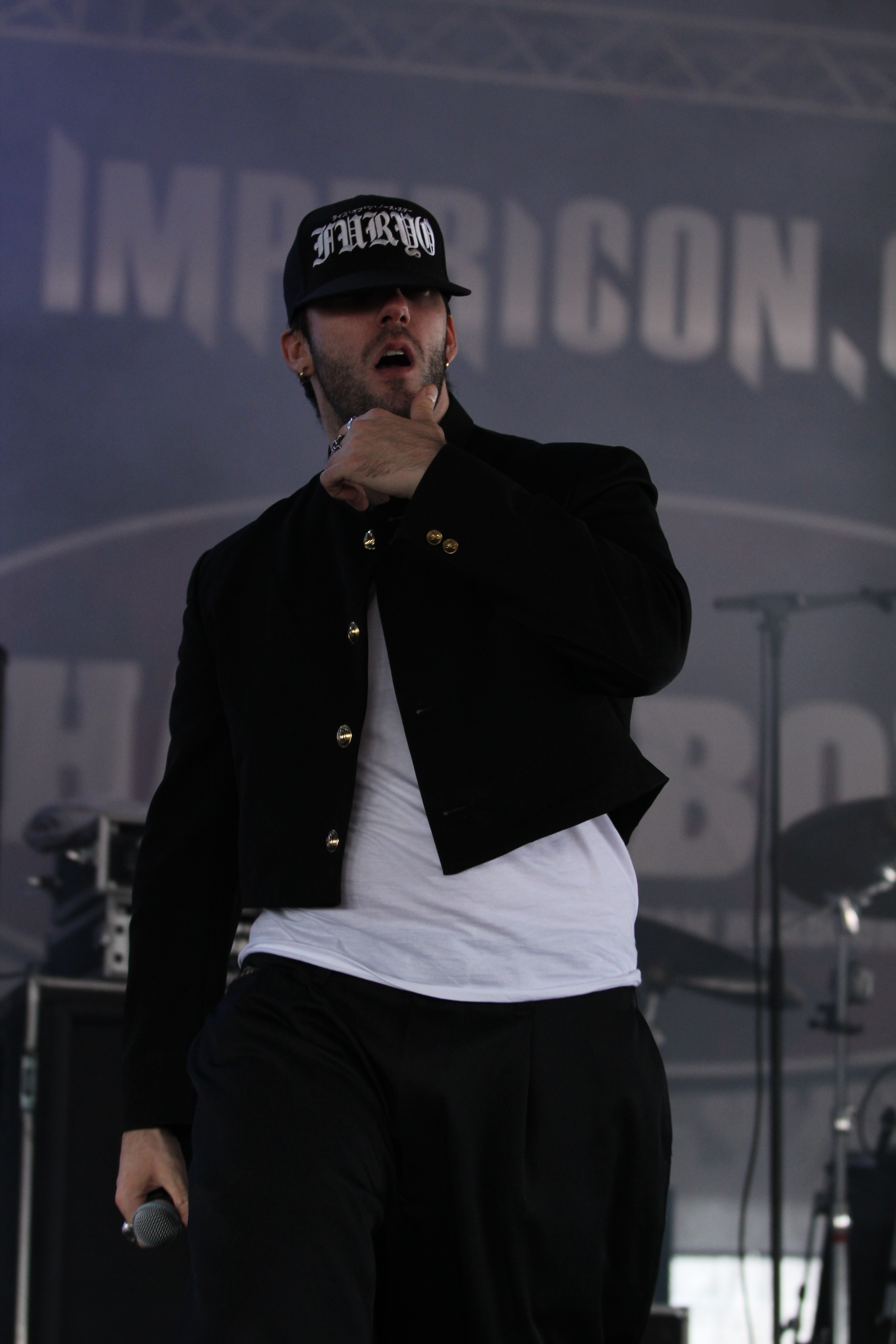
Lead singer Vithia at Full force in 2014

At the beginning of 2013, bassist Lucas announced his departure, and replaced by Fabulous Fab. The band went on the Against All Tour in Europe while also doing a separate tour in China. At the end of 2013, the band recorded their first full-length album Welcame, and created their own independent label, Repression Records. The release of the album was set for September 29, 2014, but postponed to November 24 of the same year following the agreement between the band and Nuclear Blast label. Welcame is a reference to the manga Rookies, considered by the band as their way to say welcome to new fans. Rise of the Northstar chose Zeuss to mixed and mastered the album, while they did the recording themselves: guitars at home, drums and vocals at Sainte Marthe Studio in Paris. The album was met with positive reception, and debuted at number 192 on the Belgium charts. The band then played select shows in Europe and Japan. In early 2015 the band took part in the Rebellion tour alongside Madball, Strife and Backtrack. In May they supported Dir En Grey on their European tour. In 2016 Rise of the Northstar embarked on the underrated tour which took place in Europe.

=== 2017–2021: The Legacy of Shi and Live in Paris ===
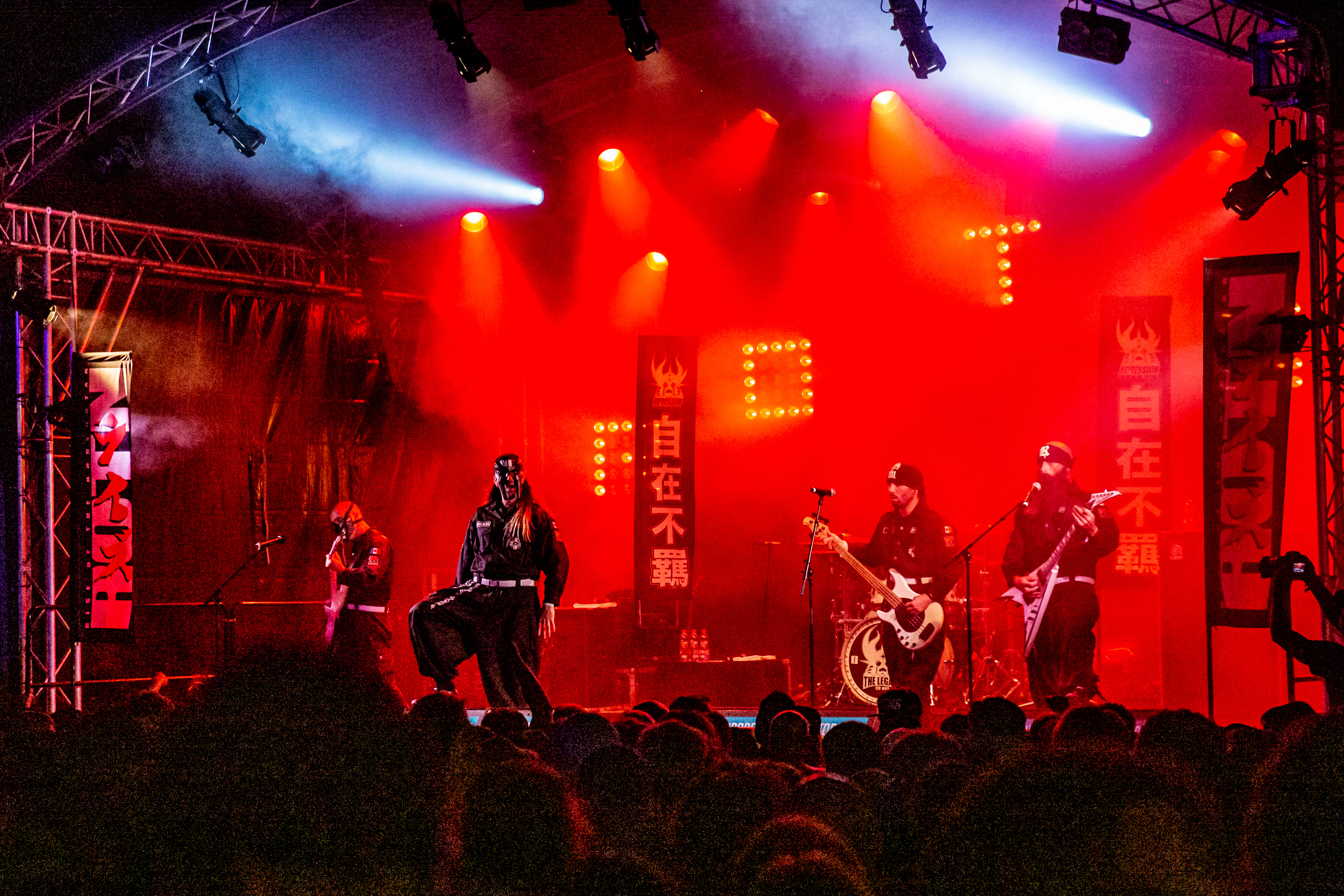
The band performing live in 2019

In March 2017, the band announced they were working on a second studio album. Before starting the album recordings, drummer Hokuto no Kev left the band. In November 2017, they went to the Silver Cord Studio in New York to record the new album, produced by Joe Duplantier of Gojira. Following the recordings, the new drummer Thomas "Phantom" Pain joined the band. On June 13, 2018, the band posted a teaser of their upcoming single "Here Comes The Boom," showing roughly 10 seconds of footage from the song. Exactly a month later on July 13, 2018, the band released it. They also released two other singles before the album released, which were "This is Crossover" in August and "Nekketsu" a week before the album's release alongside a vertical lyrical video. On October 19, 2018, The Legacy of Shi was released. According to lead guitarist Evangelion-B, the album tells the story of a Japanese spirit yōkai who possess and fight the band throughout 11 tracks. In the album, they used seven strings for the first time on half of the album, with a very low tuning, and mixed more musical styles into the album. The album made the mainstream charts in 4 countries with its highest spot peaking at number 32 in Germany. The album was met with critical acclaim, with Michael Hawkins of Punknews stated “The Legacy of Shi is a monumental achievement for Rise of the Northstar.” On March 25, 2019, the band released a teaser for an upcoming music video on their YouTube Channel. The clip contains a count from 1–4 in Japanese and a 1 second clip of the intro riff for "The Legacy of Shi" song, signalling a new music video for that song to be released sometime in the future. Three days later, on March 28, 2019, the music video was officially released. In support of the album Rise of the Northstar embarked on a 2 leg tour the first leg seen the band travell to over 13 European countries. The second leg seen them mostly German shows and took place in October.

On June 19, 2020, a live EP was released, which was performed in Paris in May 2019. This EP includes six songs from their live set, and the vinyl/Japanese edition bonus song, "Sayonara" included as a seventh.

=== 2022–present: Hiatus and new albums ===
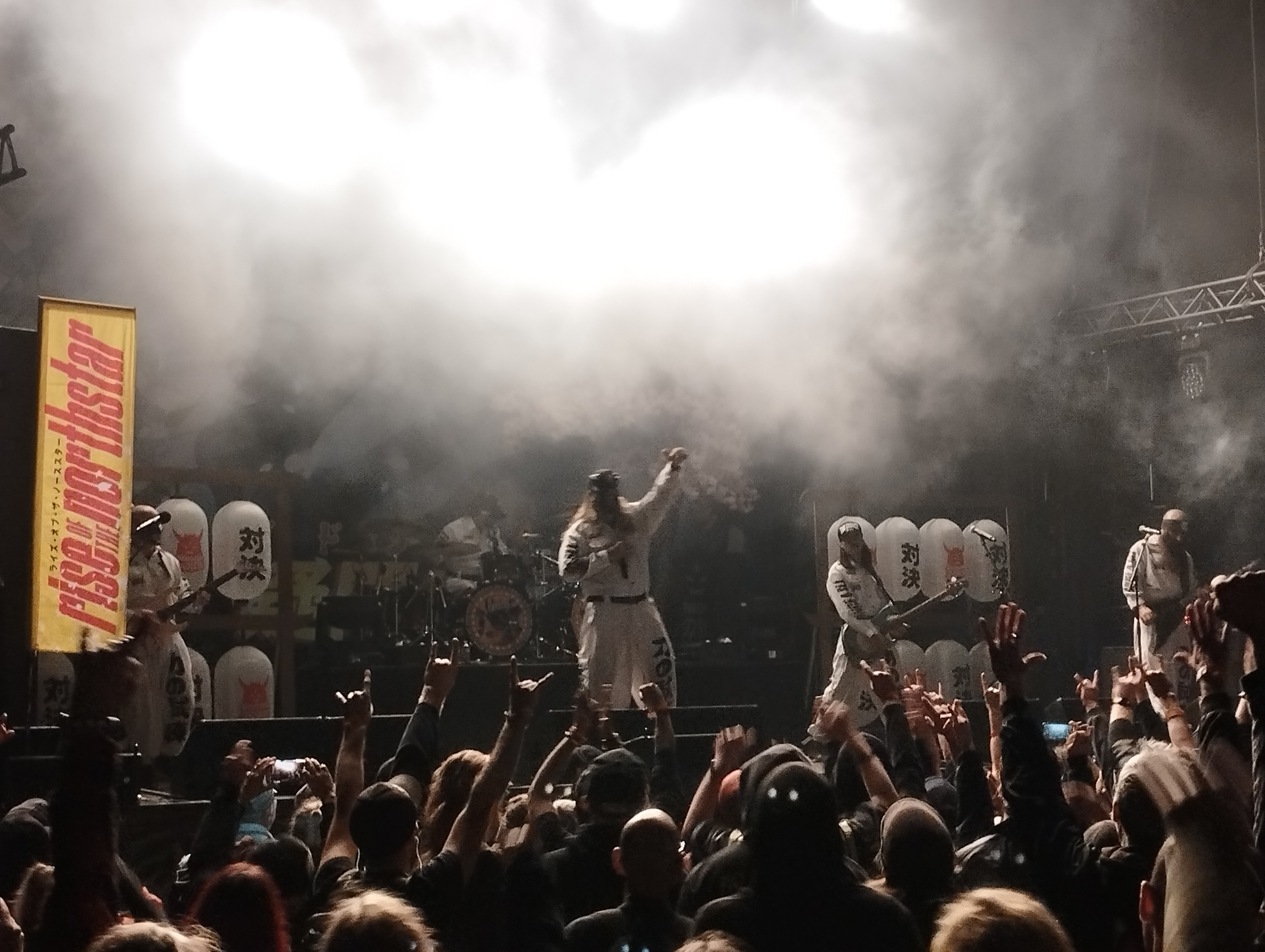
Rise of the Northstar live at Mennecy Metal Fest in 2024

In February 2022, the band went on a hiatus following allegations of domestic violence against their bassist, Fabien Lahaye. The band had indicated that Lahaye had initiated legal proceedings. In December 2022, the band returned with the announcement of a new single, which was released in January 2023. They also announced a new line-up, with a photo showing Vithia, Eva-B and Air One, along with new bassist Alexis "Yoru" Lieu and drummer Kevin "Phantom" Foley, both of metal band Hjelvik, the solo band of former Kvelertak vocalist Erlend Hjelvik.

Rise of the Northstar announced on January 20, 2023, that their third studio album would be called Showdown, which was released on April 7. That same day, they also released the music video for new single "One Love". The album was met with positive reception, and peaked at number 74 and 73 in France and Germany. Once again the band went on a two part tour in support of the record, the first leg was strictly a European tour, however during the second leg them made stops in Mexico and Brazil.

In 2024 the band embarked on the Crank It Up Tour which lasted from March 21, of 2024 to May 25. In September of 2024 the band released the song 'Underrated', in collaboration with the US rapper Hyro The Hero in an aim to return to their musical roots.

Rise of the Northstar announced on September 4, 2025, that their fourth studio album would be called Chapter 4: Red Falcon Super Battle! Neo Paris War!!. With this record the band aimed to surprise their audience they stated "are aim was to surprise our audience while sticking to our DNA, by bringing something new without crucifying the old. The era of Shogun No Shi is over, please welcome the super Mecha Falcon, symbol of modernisation of content and form, from the writing to the sound — Northstar is coming". The record was officially released on November 14, 2025, which would include three previously released singles "Neo Paris", "Back 2 Basics" and "A.I.R. Max". For the first time the band put some animated visuals in the music videos for “Falcon” and “Neo Paris” in collaboration with a company called Hotu. The band then went on their Europe Neo Tour which started November 4, and went till December 10. In the Summer of 2026 Rise of the Northstar headlined multiple French music festivals such as Xtreme Fest and Kate Fest. On September 15, the band released a new single "Nerv(e)".

== Musical style, influences, and lyrical themes ==
Rise of the Northstar's musical style blends 90's New York hardcore with metal, hip-hop elements and Japanese pop culture, a mixture that the band itself calls as "crossover". The band are influenced by metal groups such as Sepultura, Limp Bizkit, Slipknot, Korn, Periphery, Sithu Aye, Necrophagist, Plini, Terror, Rage Against the Machine, Slayer, Suicidal Tendencies, Machine Head, Hatebreed, Pantera, and Biohazard, along with hip-hop acts Wu-Tang Clan, Onyx and Mobb Deep, Their lyrics speak about the reality of the band's lives through manga references, especially Fist of the North Star, Dragon Ball, Akira, Rookies and Great Teacher Onizuka.

When asked what anime represents the band the most guitarist Eva-B stated:

The biggest one for us, which could represent the band, would be Rookies, a baseball anime, or Slam Dunk. Which is a basketball anime. When Vithia started the band, he was very influenced by the ‘bad guys/delinquents’ in college and high school. So in the lyrics, you have a lot of punchlines about those manga.

On the bands style lead singer Vithia commented:

“I just hope we’re seen as a singular, independent band offering a unique artistic equation. There are so many ways to mix the same ingredients, to tell the same story, and I’ve always tried not to slip into parody. I want to mix the two worlds that matter deeply to me: heavy music and Japanese pop culture.”

== Image ==
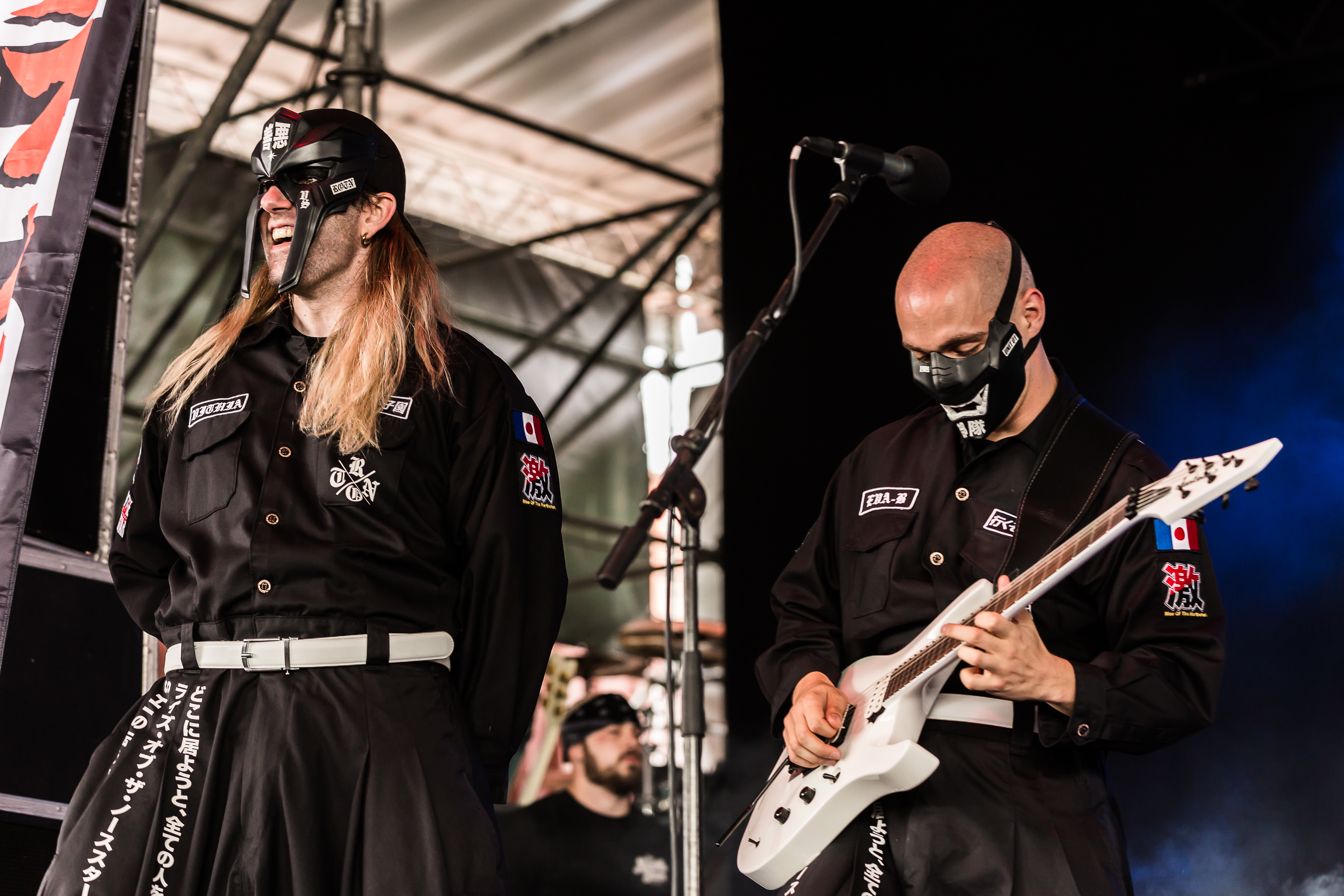
Rise of the Northstar in their signature on stage outfits in 2018

During the Demonstrating My Saiya Style and Welcame cycles, band members wore Japanese school uniforms gakuran with furyo (juvenile delinquent) style onstage: shorter jackets, huge pants and sneakers, which is totally forbidden at school in Japan. According to vocalist Vithia, "In some shōnen manga, you’ll see that furyos live their lives by their own rules, omitting the world around ’em. They run their lives as they want to, not as the society they live in would like! ROTNS is about that and our uniforms means that we are all five united with the same goals and against all the established code in this scene. We have our own codes, own rules, we create our own way". The band wears an original black uniform while occasionally wearing white as well, which has plenty of hints to shōnen manga that the band grew up with. However following the release of their 2025 album the band shifted to a more urban, stripped-down, streetwear, style. Vithia made the decision as he stated it “fits perfectly with one of the album’s most important themes: the city I come from, (Neo)Paris.”

The bands lead singer Vithia is solely responsible for the bands appearance in a 2025 interview he stated “I’m the one handling the entire visual side of the band, from designing stage outfits and scenography, to creating merch and all the different artworks.”

Their name is in reference to the 1980s Manga Hokuto no Ken which translates to Fist of the Northstar in English.

== Band members ==
Rise of the Northstar, live at With Full Force 2018

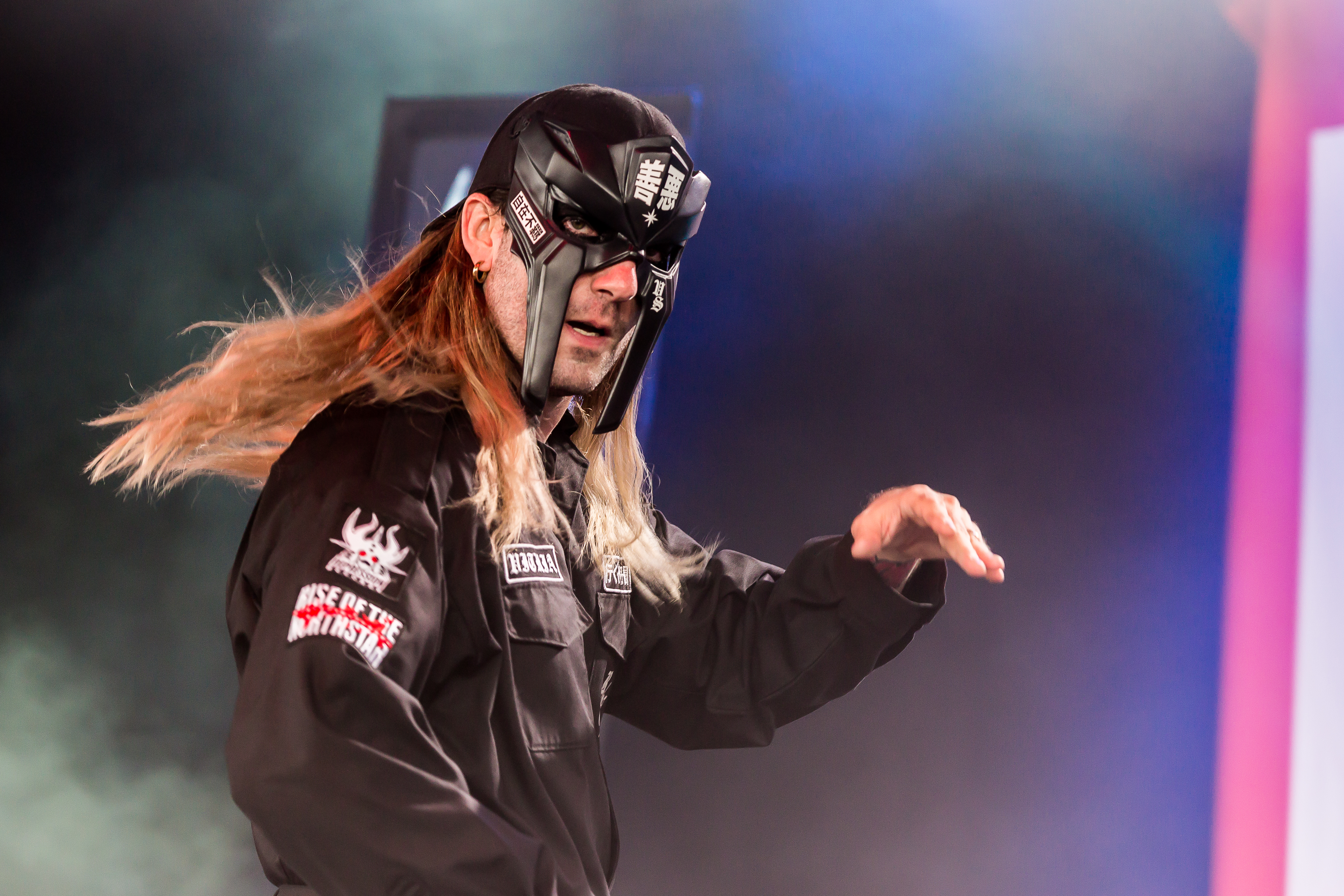
Singer Vithia

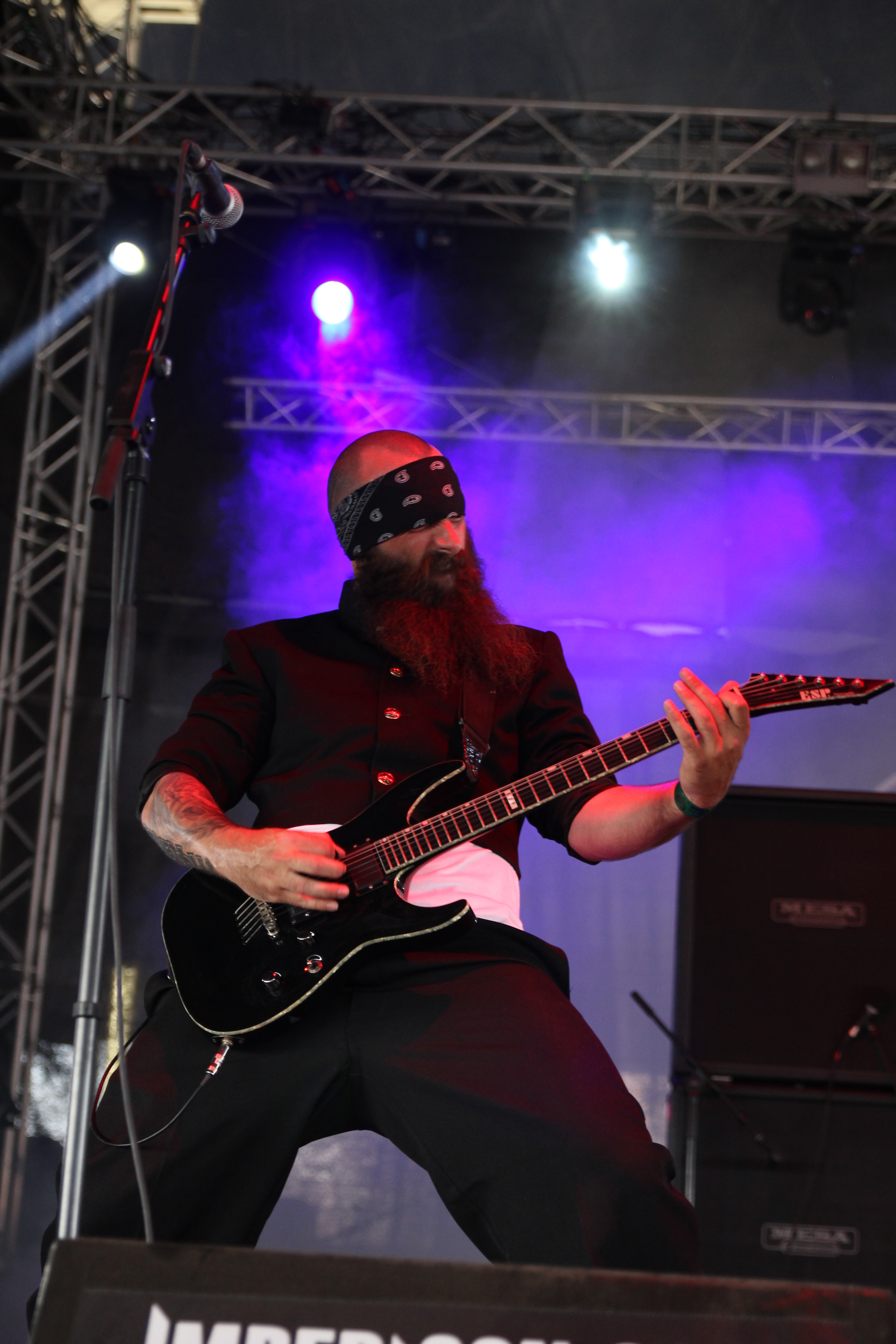
Air One

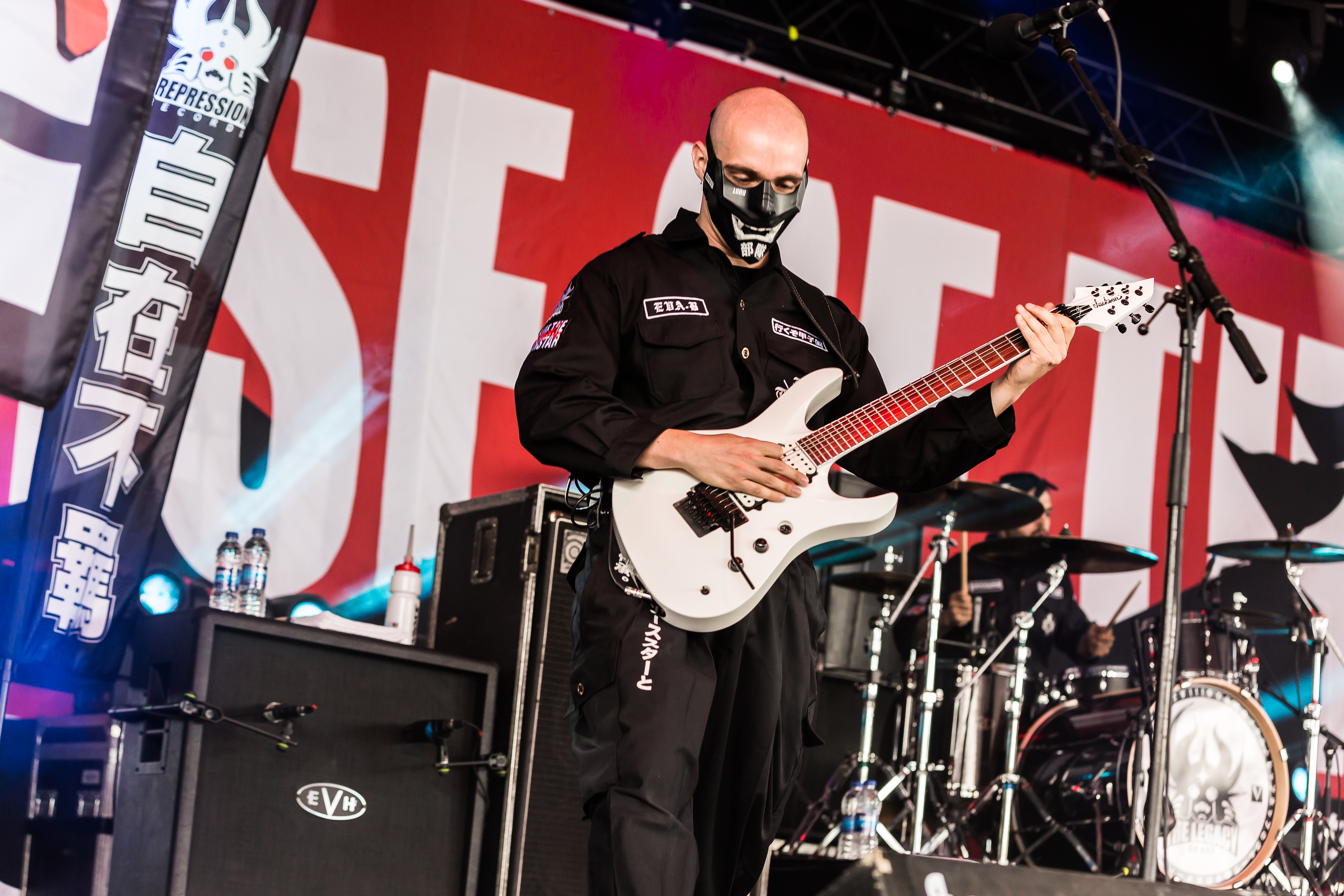
Eva-B

Current members

- Victor "Vithia" Leroy – vocals (2008–present)
- Brice "Eva-B" Gauthier – lead guitar (2010–present)
- Erwan "Air One" Menez – rhythm guitar (2011–present)
- Alexis "Yoru" Lieu – bass guitar (2022–present)
- Kevin "Phantom" Foley – drums (2022–present)

Former members

- Nicolas "Diego" Leroy – lead guitar (2008–2010)
- Max V. – drums (2008–2010)
- Loïc "Bboy" Ghanem – rhythm guitar (2008–2011)
- Lucas – bass guitar (2008–2013)
- Kevin "Hokuto no Kev" Lecomte – drums (2010–2018)
- Fabien "Fabulous Fab" Lahaye – bass guitar (2013–2022)
- Thomas "Phantom" Pain – drums (2018–2022)

Former session musicians

- Ryan Leger – drums (on The Legacy of Shi)

== Awards and nominations ==
Les Foudres (French Metal Awards)

Year	Nominee / work	Award	Result
2025	Rise of the Northstar	Artist of the Year	Nominated
2025	"Neo Paris"	Audio-Visual creation of the Year	Won
2025	Hellfest 2025	Live performance of the Year	Nominated

== Discography ==
=== Studio albums ===
List of studio albums, with selected chart positions
Title	Album details	Peak chart positions					
Title	Album details	FRA	BEL	GER	SWI	UK Indie Break	UK Rock
Welcame	Released: November 21, 2014; Label: Nuclear Blast; Formats: CD, LP, digital download	—	192	—	—	—	—
The Legacy of Shi	Released: October 19, 2018; Label: Nuclear Blast; Formats: CD, LP, digital download	82	—	32	81	20	32
Showdown	Released: April 7, 2023; Label: Atomic Fire; Formats: CD, LP, digital download	74	—	73	—	—	—
Chapter 04: Red Falcon Super Battle! Neo Paris War!!	Released: November 14, 2025; Label: Kuromaku Corp; Formats: CD, LP, digital download	137	—	—	—	—	—
"—" denotes releases that did not chart.

=== Extended plays ===
List of extended plays
Title	EP details
Tokyo Assault	Released: January 12, 2010; Label: Akatsuki Records; Format: CD
Demonstrating My Saiya Style	Released: July 23, 2012; Label: Akatsuki Records; Formats: CD, digital download
Live in Paris	Released: June 19, 2020; Label: Nuclear Blast; Formats: CD, digital download

== Music videos ==
List of music videos
Year	Title	Director(s)	Album	Link
2011	"Protect Ya Chest"	Ben Berzerker	Demonstrating My Saiya Style	
2011	"Phoenix"	Grégoire Orio	Non-album single	
2012	"Sound of Wolves"	Ben Berzerker	Demonstrating My Saiya Style	
2012	"Demonstrating My Saiya Style"	Ben Berzerker	Demonstrating My Saiya Style	
2014	"Welcame (Furyo State of Mind)"	Ben Berzerker	Welcame	
2015	"Samurai Spirit"	Ben Berzerker	Welcame	
2016	"What the Fuck"	Ben Berzerker	Welcame	
2018	"Here Comes the Boom"	Ben Berzerker	The Legacy of Shi	
2019	"The Legacy of Shi"	Ben Berzerker	The Legacy of Shi	
2023	"One Love"	Ben Berzerker	Showdown	[10]
2023	"Showdown"	Ben Berzerker	Showdown	[11]
2025	“Neo Paris”	Vithia and Hotu	Chapter 04: Red Falcon Super Battle! Neo Paris War!!	[12]
2025	“Back to Basics”	Vithia	Chapter 04: Red Falcon Super Battle! Neo Paris War!!	[13]
2025	“Falcon”	Pavel Trebukhin	Chapter 04: Red Falcon Super Battle! Neo Paris War!!	[14]
2026	"Nerv(e)"	Pavel Trebukhin	Non album single	[15]
