= Flesh Stays Together =

Studio album by Dying Wish
- Released: September 26, 2025
- Genre: Metalcore
- Length: 35:55
- Label: SharpTone
- Producer: Will Putney

Dying Wish chronology
Symptoms of Survival (2023)	Flesh Stays Together (2025)

Singles from Flesh Stays Together
- 1. "I'll Know You're Not Around" Released: July 30, 2025; 2. "Revenge in Carnage" Released: August 27, 2025

Flesh Stays Together is the third studio album by American metalcore band Dying Wish. It was released on September 26, 2025, via SharpTone.

== Background ==
The album was preceded by the band's 2023 full-length release, Symptoms of Survival, and produced by Will Putney. Emma Boster of the band noted about Flesh Stays Together, "Together we face the most unacceptable conditions in our lifetimes. Every tragedy becomes our own yet we have never been more separated. Flesh is a vicious wake up call. Slowly and painfully we approach the end we deserve."

"I'll Know You're Not Around" was released as a single on July 30, 2025, alongside a music video directed by Eric Richter and Pedro Carrillo.

== Reception ==
Professional ratings
Review scores
Source	Rating
Distorted Sound	9/10
Kerrang	4/5
Metal Hammer	7/10
New Noise	4.5/5 stars

Rating it 4.5 stars in his review for New Noise, Nicholas Senior referred to the work as "Dying Wish's best work to date, despite not delivering on what many would have asked for them." Sam Law of Kerrang! remarked, "It's a compelling squeeze to find yourself caught up in, a stark coming of age for metalcore pacesetters whose potential now seems limitless," giving it a rating of four.

Writing for Distorted Sound, Amber Brooks described the album as "a landmark in creating eerie metalcore, another jewel in the crown of the genre's relatively recent ability to lean into horror tropes, championed by grotesque atmosphere, vile breakdowns and placing the listener in extreme moments of sonic danger," assigning it a rating score of nine.

Metal Hammer's Nik Young, rating the album seven, observed, "As tracks shift between melancholic and mercilessly heavy, Emma Boster slips effortlessly between full-pelt screams, moody cleans and moments of fragility, successfully making the heavy sections even more brutal."

== Track listing ==
All tracks are written by Dying Wish.

Flesh Stays Together track listing
No.	Title	Length
1.	"I Don't Belong Anywhere"	4:04
2.	"A Curse Upon Iron"	3:55
3.	"I'll Know You're Not Around"	3:43
4.	"Revenge in Carnage"	2:27
5.	"Nothing Like You"	4:14
6.	"Surrender Everything"	2:57
7.	"Moments I Regret"	3:43
8.	"Empty the Chamber"	2:47
9.	"Heaven Departs"	4:03
10.	"Flesh Stays Together"	4:02
Total length:		35:55

== Personnel ==
Credits adapted from the album's liner notes.

=== Dying Wish ===
- Emma Boster – lead vocals
- Sam Reynolds – guitar, backing vocals
- Pedro Carrillo – guitar, backing vocals
- Jonathan Mackey – bass, backing vocals
- Jeffrey Yambra – drums

=== Additional contributors ===
- Will Putney – production, engineering, mixing, mastering
- Steve Seid – additional engineering
- Tommy Vasta – engineering assistance
- Imani Givertz – artwork photography
- Alex Basovskiy – album layout
