= Stuck Out =

Australian band

- Origin: Melbourne, Australia
- Genres: Alternative rock; pop punk; punk rock
- Years active: 2015–2022
- Labels: SharpTone, Greyscale
- Past members: Jackson Cairnduff; Bren Dugan; Joshua Walker; Ian Browney; Sheldon Schuyler; Lachy Lydiard

Stuck Out were an Australian rock band from Melbourne, formed in 2015. The band's final line-up consisted of guitarist Ian Browney, bassist Sheldon Schuyler, drummer Lachy Lydiard, and vocalist Joshua Walker. The band released two extended plays: You Won't Come Home (2018) and Lie Through Your Teeth (2020), before breaking up in 2022 without ever releasing a studio album.

== History ==
=== Formation and early years (2015–2017) ===
Stuck Out was formed in 2015 in Melbourne by Ian Browney on lead guitar, Bren Dugan on rhythm guitar, Lachy Lydiard on drums, and Josh Walker on bass and vocals. The four were school friends, and after graduating they decided to make the band legitimate. In 2015 through their Bandcamp site the band released an acoustic single "Homebound" and subsequently backed this up with the 2-track "Head Above Water", and later a stand-alone single "Statelines". In April 2016, Jackson Cairnduff joined the band on bass guitar. Later the same year the band released a 3-track titled "What We've Come To Be", from which they gathered a modest fanbase. Ahead of the band's next release, they amicably parted ways with bassist Jackson Cairnduff and shortly after Sheldon Schuyler, a school friend of the band, was added to fill the vacant position.

=== You Won't Come Home and Dugan's departure (2018–2019) ===
In January 2018 the 5-piece signed onto Greyscale Records, the band later then worked under the label to create their debut EP You Won't Come Home, it was released on the band's new Bandcamp site a month later. Chris Vernon of Belle Haven helped record the album. The track "Self Doubt" features guest vocals from Jake Wilson from fellow local act Between You And Me. Vocalist Josh Walker described their new EP as being the start of a new progression, "progression of sound, progression of story and progression of the band." On 10 April, a music video for their single "Stitch" was released. In May, Stuck Out performed their EP to a sold-out crowd at the Workers Club in Fitzroy, Victoria. On 14 October, they released "Linger (Stripped Back)", an acoustic cover of their track "Linger", it was uploaded alongside a music video. Later that year, in December, Stuck Out joined the lineup for the inaugural Good Things festival in Melbourne as a local support band, becoming the first band to ever play at Good Things Festival.

On 7 February 2019, Stuck Out released their new single entitled "Everything You Wanted" along with an accompanying music video. Walker based the lyrics on his personal experiences of feeling lost and confused through different relations with people, he said: "We really tried to encapsulate sincerity in this new single. It’s that feeling of not being good enough for the person you feel is too good for you and not quite knowing how to fix yourself." Kel Burch from Depth criticised the single saying that they "[felt] like it may be time for Stuck Out to push the limits a little more." On 5 May, Stuck Out announced that long-time rhythm guitarist Bren Dugan will leave the band to focus on other life ambitions, he played two final shows with the band later in the month before officially leaving.

=== Lie Through Your Teeth and disbandment (2020–2022) ===
In October 2020, it was announced that in addition to being signed to Greyscale Records, Stuck Out were added to SharpTone Records for international releases. On 27 October, they also released their latest single, "Mindless" featuring Yours Truly vocalist, Mikaila Delgado. Following this was the reveal of their then-upcoming sophomore EP, Lie Through Your Teeth, The first EP to be released jointly by Greyscale and SharpTone. Lie Through Your Teeth was then released successfully on 18 December.

In May 2021, the band played three shows with Yours Truly for their Self Care album tour. A promotional tour for their December-released EP Lie Through Your Teeth was announced for August to November dates, but due to the then-recent COVID-19 variant outbreak, all of their shows were cancelled. No future dates were made, and all tickets were refunded.

Stuck Out released their last ever single "Split in Two" alongside an accompanying music video on 22 March 2022, after announcing their final show and eventual disbandment.

== Musical style ==
Kel Burch of Depth Magazine described their debut EP You Won't Come Home as "precious snapshot of emotional vulnerability" with the lyrics of the songs telling a story of love and loss. Max Jacobson of Hysteria Mag described their sound as being "backed by thick production, gruff vocals and warm guitar tones, with a bit of dirt on them to keep things from sounding too clean". Similarly vocalist Josh Walker's delivery was described as "gruff-yet-melodic". Their sound had been likened to Knuckle Puck and The Story So Far.

== Members ==
Final

- Josh Walker – vocals (2015–2022); bass (2015–2016)
- Ian Browney – lead guitar, backing vocals (2015–2022)
- Sheldon Schuyler – bass guitar (2017–2022)
- Lachy Lydiard – drums (2015–2022)

Former

- Jackson Cairnduff – bass guitar (2016–2017)
- Bren Dugan – rhythm guitar (2015–2019)

== Discography ==
=== Extended plays ===
List of extended plays
Title	EP details
You Won't Come Home	Released: 9 February 2018; Label: Greyscale; Format: Digital download, streaming
Lie Through Your Teeth	Released: 18 December 2020; Label: Greyscale, SharpTone; Format: Digital download, streaming, LP

=== Singles ===
Title	Year	EP
"Homebound"	2015	non-album singles
"Head Above Water"	2015	non-album singles
"Statelines"	2016	non-album singles
"What We've Come To Be"	2016	non-album singles
"Fade Away"	2018	You Won't Come Home
"Stitch"	2018	You Won't Come Home
"Linger (Stripped Back Version)"	2018	non-album singles
"Everything You Wanted"	2019	non-album singles
"Who You Are"	2020	non-album singles
"Mindless" (feat. Mikaila Delgado)	2020	Lie Through Your Teeth
"Inverse"	2020	Lie Through Your Teeth
"False Promise"	2020	Lie Through Your Teeth
"Split in Two"	2022	non-album single

=== Music videos ===
Year	Song	Director
2016	"Fragments"	Cian Marangos
2018	"Fade Away"	Cian Marangos
2018	"Stitch"	Liam Davidson
2018	"Linger (Stripped Back Version)"	Sabian Lynch
2019	"Everything You Wanted"	Ed Reiss
2020	"Who You Are"	Cian Marangos
2020	"Mindless"	Cian Marangos
2020	"Inverse"	Cian Marangos
2020	"False Promise"	Cian Marangos
2022	"Split in Two"	Cian Marangos
