= Acres (band) =

English rock band

- Origin: Portsmouth, Hampshire, U.K.
- Genres: Post-hardcore; post-rock; alternative metal; melodic hardcore; screamo (early)
- Years active: 2011–present
- Labels: A Wolf At Your Door; Silva Screen; Solid State; Animal Defence; Small Town; Dream Atlantic; Don't Shoot The Messenger
- Members: Alex Freeman; Ben Lumber; Jack Rogers; Ash Scott; Parker Adsit
- Past members: Matthew Tubb; Richard Morgan; John Osola; Theodore Sandberg; Matthew Hiscock; Konnor Bracher-Walsh

Acres are an English rock band from Portsmouth, Hampshire. Formed in 2011, by Alex Freeman (guitar), Matt Tubb (guitar), Richard Morgan (vocals), John Osola (bass) and Matthew Hiscock (drums), the band experienced a large number of lineup and sound changes throughout their career. On their debut, self-titled EP (2012), they played screamo, then embracing elements of post-metal and doom metal on their second EP Solace (2014). Morgan departed from the band in 2015, replaced by Ben Lumber, who brought a more melodic sensibility to the band, particularly clean singing. On their 2017 EPs Smoke and Decay and In Sickness & Health, they veered into melodic hardcore and emo, while on their debut album Lonely World (2019), they played post-rock and post-hardcore. On their second album Burning Throne (2023) and third album The Host (2025), they played alternative metal and post-hardcore.

== History ==
Acres was founded in 2011, by guitarist Alex Freeman, vocalist Richard Morgan, bassist John Osola, drummer Matthew Hiscock and second guitarist Matt Tubb. They took their name from the street Longacres, which they passed while driving to their early rehearsals. On 24 May 2013, they released the single "The Tallest Of Mountains" through Dreambound. On 28 December 2013, they released the single "Write Home" featuring Violet guitarist Charlie Bass. On 10 March 2014, they released the single "Overburden" through Dreambound, at first exclusively streaming for Punktastic. Between 23 and 28 May 2014, they supported Echoes and Winchester on their UK headline tour. Between 12 and 24 October 2014, they toured the United Kingdom with Climates.

In 2014, they began writing material for their third EP. However, in 2015, Richard Morgan departed from the band, and was replaced by Ben Lumber. On 11 November 2016, they released the single "In Sickness & Health", announcing it would be a part of their upcoming third EP. By this time, the lineup consisted of guitarists Freeman and Theo Sandberg, drummer Matthew Hiscock, bassist John Osola and vocalist Lumber. On 10 February 2017, they released the single "Gloom". On 24 February 2017, they released the EP In Sickness & Health. That year, they toured mainland Europe with support from Canvas. Between 21 and 27 February 2017, they opened for Hellions on their UK tour. In July, they performed at 2000 Trees. On 5 December 2017, they released the single "Unwelcome", and announced it would be a part of their upcoming debut album. Between 8 and 16 December, they headlined a tour of mainland Europe.

On 28 April 2019, they released the single "Talking In Your Sleep", announcing it would be a part of their debut album Lonely World. Between 6 and 11 May, they headlined a tour of England. Around this time, Sandberg departed from the band, instead hiring bassist Jack Rogers of Canvas. By this time, they consisted of Morgan, guitarists Theodore Sandberg and Alex Freeman, drummer Konnor Bracher-Walsh. They opened for Casey on their 2019 farewell tour. Their debut album Lonely World was released on 9 August. Later that month, they performed at Hevy Fest. On 10 June 2019, they released a music video for the song "Be Alone", and announced that their upcoming debut album would be titled Lonely World. Between 4 and 22 September, they headlined a tour of the UK and mainland Europe, with Caskets supporting the UK dates and Tripsitter supporting the mainland dates. On 31 August 2019, they burned at Burn it Down festival.

On 24 November 2022, they announced their second album, Burning Throne, would be released on 3 March 2023 through A Wolf At Your Door Records. On 11 January 2024, they released the single "A Different Shade Of Misery". It was included as a part of their EP What It’s Like to Feel Worthless, which was released on 25 October 2024, through Solid State Records. In 2025, they had hired drummer Ash Scott. On 28 February 2025, they released the single "Bloodlust", announcing it would be a part of their third album The Host, which was release 2 May.

== Musical style ==
Critics have categorised their music as a whole as post-hardcore and melodic hardcore. Their music makes use of reverb, atmospheric, sombre lyrics, emotional vocals and driving rhythms.

Acres earliest work was screamo, influenced by Devil Sold His Soul, Rinoa, A Hope for Home, Underoath, This Will Destroy You, In the time between their 2012 self-titled EP and their second EP, Solace (2014), they toured Germany with many post-metal and doom metal bands, which influenced their sound of the EP. With the addition of Lumber, they began to make use of clean singing in addition to screaming, an element that set them apart from many of their contemporaries. The album was categorised as emotional hardcore and melodic hardcore, citing influences including Pianos Become the Teeth, Hans Zimmer, Architects and Paramore, as well as post-rock. On Lonely World (2019), they played post-rock, or what Alternative Press called "post-hardcore infused with bleak melodies and sprinkled a dash of screamo". and they were taking influence from Thrice, the Used and Taking Back Sunday. Punktastic noted its vocals as being similar to those used in metalcore. Their second album Burning Throne was post-hardcore and alternative metal with elements of screamo and electronic music. Their third album The Host (2025), was alternative metal. Short songs, gritty vocals, lyrics about loss. Incorporated their atmospheric elements into heavier instrumentation.

They have been cited as an influence by Currents.

== Members ==
Current

- Alex Freeman – guitar (2011–present)
- Ben Lumber – vocals (2015–present)
- Jack Rogers – bass (2019–present)
- Ash Scott – guitar (2023–present)
- Parker Adsit - drums (2025-present)

Former

- Matthew Tubb – guitar (2011–2013)
- Richard Morgan – vocals (2011–2015)
- John Osola – bass, vocals (2014–2018)
- Matthew Hiscock – drums (2016–2018)
- Theodore Sandberg – guitar (2016–2023)
- Konnor Bracher-Walsh – drums (2018–2024)

== Discography ==
Studio albums

- Lonely World (2019)
- Burning Throne (2023)
- The Host (2025)

EPs

- Acres (2012)
- Solace (2014)
- In Sickness and Health (2017)
- Smoke And Decay (2017)
- What It’s Like to Feel Worthless (2024)
