= Caskets (band) =

British rock band

- Also known as: Captives (2018–2021)
- Origin: Leeds, England
- Genres: Post-hardcore; alternative metal; alternative rock; synth-rock
- Years active: 2018–present
- Label: SharpTone
- Members: Matthew Flood; Benjamin Wilson; James Lazenby; Craig Robinson
- Past members: Lee Horner; Christopher McIntosh
- Website: www.casketsofficial.com

Caskets (formerly known as Captives) are a British rock band from Leeds, formed in 2018. The band are signed onto SharpTone Records and currently consists of lead vocalist Matthew Flood, lead guitarist Benjamin Wilson, rhythm guitarist Craig Robinson, and drummer James Lazenby.

== History ==
=== 2018–2020: Founding and Ghost Like You ===
The band was founded by bassist Christopher McIntosh, who at the time played rhythm guitar, Benjamin Wilson (lead guitar), and bassist Lee Horner, who left their previous project Faultlines to focus on new ventures. The band was completed with James Lazenby (drums) and Matthew Flood (vocals). On 23 September 2018, the band released their debut single Ghost Like You via the YouTube channel Dreambound. The eponymous EP was announced for April 2019. Prior to release, the band released two more singles, Signs and Find a Way, before the EP was self-released on 26 April 2019.

Following this, the band went on a European tour with the Australian post-hardcore band Hands Like Houses and another show as a support act for Bad Omens in Hannover. In the summer, Caskets performed at several festivals, including in Germany and Sweden, and played some shows as a support act for the Japanese metalcore band Crystal Lake in Germany. The band toured the United Kingdom in September 2019 with Acres and Parting Gift, where they debuted a new single named Falling Apart.

After the tour, founding member Lee Horner left the band for personal reasons. Christopher McIntosh switched from rhythm guitar to bass. Former Glamour Of The Kill guitarist Craig Robinson was recruited as the new rhythm guitarist. On 1 March 2020, Caskets released the previously live-only single Falling Apart, again via Dreambound. The band was soon signed by SharpTone Records. With the announcement of being signed, Caskets announced their new single Glass Heart, which was released on 4 December 2020.

=== 2021–2022: Name change and Lost Souls ===
Following a legal dispute with an Australian band of the same name, which had applied for trademark rights to the name "Captives" in the UK, the British band was forced to change their name to "Caskets".

During the legal dispute, the band's YouTube channel was Spotify were paused. About two weeks after the name change, the band's content was again accessible on the respective platforms. The band stated that without a name change, it would have been impossible for them to release new music for about twelve months.

Now under their new name Caskets, the band announced a new single for 7 May 2021, titled Lost in Echoes. After the release of this single, the debut album Lost Souls was announced, which was released on 13 August. The singles Glass Heart and Lost in Echoes are found on this album, Falling Apart was subsequently integrated into the tracklist of newer editions of the EP Ghost Like You, after the song was previously released on a limited edition of the EP with an alternative, black cover, which sold out within hours. The third single The Only Ones was announced on 19 June for 25 June.

Following the release of their debut album, the band toured in the autumn of 2021 as a support act for the Swedish alternative rock band Normandie, which was also supported by the American post-hardcore band Thousand Below. This tour included stops in Germany, Austria, Switzerland, Belgium, the Netherlands, and the United Kingdom. Previously, the performances had been postponed from March 2021 to October due to the COVID-19 pandemic. However, Caskets announced that they had to cancel this tour due to scheduling reasons.

Shortly thereafter, Caskets was confirmed as a support act for an EU tour of the American band Dance Gavin Dance, which was supposed to take place in September and October 2022 but had to be postponed to March 2023 due to illness of Dance Gavin Dance singer Jon Mess. Due to controversy surrounding clean vocalist Tilian Pearson, who had briefly left the band following allegations of sexual misconduct but was later reinstated in an official statement from the band, Caskets announced that they would have to cancel the joint tour.

=== 2023–2024: Reflections and continued touring ===
On 25 August 2023, Caskets released their follow-up album Reflections. Several singles were released beforehand. Throughout 2023, the band played numerous concerts as support for We Came as Romans on their EU/UK tour in May, as well as a support act for Blessthefall (3 August 2023 to 7 September 2023). From 20 November to 14 December, the band played 18 concerts in Europe and the United Kingdom as a support act for Of Mice & Men. Shortly after the end of the last concert of the tour leg on the European mainland, they announced that they would participate in "The Deathless Tour" (13 March to 30 April 2024) by Set It Off, supporting them along with Crown the Empire and Death by Romy.

On 25 February 2024, they announced the departure of founding member and bassist Christopher McIntosh. On 28 February, the band announced that they would play the Aftershock Festival in Sacramento, California. On 7 March, the band announced their own headlining tour in Australia supported by The Home Team. On 27 June, Caskets announced their first headlining tour of the United States and Canada, scheduled from 10 September to 16 October.

=== 2025–present: The Only Heaven You’ll Know ===
On 7 May 2025, Caskets released the song "Make Me a Martyr". On 24 July, the band released their second single of the year, "The Only Heaven You'll Know." That same day, their third studio album, The Only Heaven You'll Know, was announced, scheduled for 7 November. In March and April 2026, they will join Aviana as supporting acts for the Silence Follows Tour in the United States and Canada headlined by Erra and Currents.

== Influences ==
Caskets have cited influences including Holding Absence, Fightstar, Spiritbox, I Prevail, Architects, Trivium, Avenged Sevenfold, Funeral for a Friend, Slaves, Incubus, Sum 41, Lewis Capaldi, Aaron Spears, the Weeknd, John Mayer and synthwave.

== Band members ==
Current

- Matthew Flood – lead vocals (2018–present)
- Benjamin Wilson – lead guitar, backing vocals (2018–present)
- James Lazenby – drums (2018–present)
- Craig Robinson – rhythm guitar, backing vocals (2020–present)

Former

- Lee Horner – bass (2018–2020)
- Christopher McIntosh – rhythm guitar (2018–2020), bass (2020–2024)

Timeline

== Discography ==
=== Studio albums ===
| Title | Details | Peak chart positions | |
| Title | Details | SCO | UK Rock |
|---|---|---|---|
| Lost Souls | Released: 13 August 2021; Label: SharpTone Records; Format: Digital download, LP, CD; Tracklisting: 1. The Only Ones; 2. Glass Heart; 3. Hold Me Now; 4. Lost in Echoes; 5. Clarity; 6. Hopes & Dreams; 7. Drowned in Emotion; 8. Lose Myself; 9. The Final Say; 10. One More Time; 11. Nothing to Hide | 77 | 4 |
| Reflections | Released: 11 August 2023; Label: SharpTone Records; Format: Digital download, LP, CD; Tracklisting: 1. Believe; 2. More Than Misery (feat. Telle Smith); 3. In the Silence; 4. Too Late; 5. By the Sound; 6. Six Feet Down; 7. Silhouettes; 8. Guiding Light; 9. Hate Me; 10. Better Way Out | — | 28 |
| The Only Heaven You'll Know | Released: 7 November 2025; Label: SharpTone Records; Format: Digital download, LP, CD; Tracklisting: 1. Lost in the Violence; 2. Our Remedy (feat. Make Them Suffer); 3. The Only Heaven You'll Ever Know; 4. Closure; 5. Sacrifice; 6. What Have I Become?; 7. Make Me a Martyr; 8. Save Us; 9. Escape; 10. In Vein; 11. Broken Path | — | — |

=== EPs ===
| Title | Album details |
|---|---|
| Ghost Like You | Released: 26 April 2019; Label: Self-released; Formats: Digital download, LP, CD; Tracklisting: 1. Ghost Like You; 2. Signs; 3. Crashing Down; 4. Find a Way; 5. Not Enough |

=== Singles ===
| Title | Year | Album |
|---|---|---|
| "Ghost Like You" | 2018 | Ghost Like You |
| "Signs" | 2018 | Ghost Like You |
| "Find a Way" | 2019 | Ghost Like You |
| "Falling Apart" | 2020 | Non-album single |
| "Glass Heart" | 2020 | Lost Souls |
| "Lost in Echoes" | 2021 | Lost Souls |
| "The Only Ones" | 2021 | Lost Souls |
| "Drowned in Emotion" | 2021 | Lost Souls |
| "Guiding Light" | 2022 | Reflections |
| "By The Sound" | 2023 | Reflections |
| "More Than Misery"(featuring Telle Smith) | 2023 | Reflections |
| "Better Way Out" | 2023 | Reflections |
| "Believe" | 2023 | Reflections |
| "Make Me a Martyr" | 2025 | The Only Heaven You'll Know |
| "The Only Heaven You'll Know" | 2025 | The Only Heaven You'll Know |
| "Closure" | 2025 | The Only Heaven You'll Know |
| "Sacrifice" | 2025 | The Only Heaven You'll Know |
