= SharpTone Records =

American independent record label

- Founded: September 11, 2013
- Founder: Markus Staiger; Shawn Keith
- Distributors: Nuclear Blast; Believe
- Genre: Metalcore; post-hardcore; pop-punk; alternative rock; nu metal
- Country of origin: United States
- Location: Los Angeles, California
- Official website: sharptonerecords.co

SharpTone Records is an American independent record label started on September 11, 2013. The label was founded by Nuclear Blast CEO Markus Staiger and former vice president of Sumerian Records Shawn Keith.

== History ==
=== Conception and first releases (2013) ===
The record label was started by Markus Staiger, the current CEO of Nuclear Blast Records and Shawn Keith, the former vice president of Sumerian Records. The label has been described as an offshoot label of Nuclear Blast which primarily focuses on rock and alternative music, similar to Arising Empire. Arising Empire focuses on metalcore and punk bands. In an interview, Keith spoke about the label: "Developing this label has been very exciting for me. The opportunity to partner and cultivate new and established artists working toward broadening their global potential is thrilling. SharpTone will continue to diversify and evolve as a brand for music fans to truly identify with. We are not just another record label. We are a new-music company, allowing artists to be as creative and passionate as they choose to be."

The record label was first hinted at on June 23, 2016, when several bands shared a mysterious teaser image reading "A New Era of Music Begins..." on their social media. These bands included Attila, Don Broco, Loathe, Miss May I and We Came as Romans. The first release of the label would be a re-issue of the debut EP Prepare Consume Proceed by UK metal band Loathe less than a month later, but the labels first studio album release would be Attila's sixth album titled Chaos, released November 4 the same year. Other later releases for the year included the American release of Don Broco's Automatic, and a release of Craig Owens new side project, badXchannels, who was also signed later in 2016, with the EP being named WHYDFML. Emmure also signed in 2016.

=== Releases and signings (2017–present) ===
The label's roster would increase from nine bands in 2016 to seventeen acts by the end of 2017. They released 12 studio albums from bands including Emmure's Look at Yourself, Loathe's The Cold Sun, While She Sleeps' You Are We, and Miss May I's Shadows Inside to name a few. In 2018, along with signing four new bands including Bleeding Through, the label's first band to move away from the label, Attila, said they wanted absolute creative freedom. That was their reason for going solo without the help of any record label. In 2018 the label issued Don Broco's Technology, Sink the Ship's Persevere, and Bleeding Through's Love Will Kill All among others.

== Music ==
The record label primarily focuses on different subgenres within rock music, more specifically the post-hardcore and progressive metalcore side of rock. Early signings included Attila, Emmure, Currents, and Loathe.

== Notable artists ==
=== Current ===
List of all current artists signed with SharpTone
Artist	Year signed	Origin
Alpha Wolf	2017	Australia: Burnie, Tasmania
Better Lovers	2023	US: Buffalo, New York
Bleeding Through	2018	US: Orange County, California
Boston Manor	2021	UK: Blackpool, England
Caskets	2020	UK: Leeds, England
Chiodos	2026	US: Davison, Michigan
Dying Wish	2020	US: Portland, Oregon
Emmure	2016	US: New Fairfield, Connecticut
Foreign Hands	2022	US: Wilmington, Delaware
Jamie's Elsewhere	2023	US: Sacramento, California
Kingdom of Giants	2024	US: Sacramento, California
Loathe	2016	UK: Liverpool, England
Make Them Suffer	2023	Australia: Perth
Mothica	2025	US: Oklahoma City, Oklahoma
Ocean Grove	2024	Australia: Melbourne
Polaris	2017	Australia: Sydney
Poison the Well	2026	US: Miami, Florida
Pridelands	2021	Australia: Mount Gambier
Stepson	2020	Australia: Brisbane
Stick to Your Guns	2024	US: Orange County, California
Story of the Year	2022	US: St. Louis, Missouri
Vukovi	2023	UK: Kilwinning, Scotland
We Came as Romans	2016	US: Troy, Michigan

=== Former ===
List of all former artists no longer signed with SharpTone
Artist	Years Labelled	Origin
156/Silence	2020–2025	US: Pittsburgh, Pennsylvania
Annisokay	2017	Germany: Halle (Saale), Saxony-Anhalt
Any Given Day	2019	Germany: Gelsenkirchen
Attila	2016–2018	US: Atlanta, Georgia
August Burns Red	2022–2026	US: Lancaster, Pennsylvania
badXchannels	2016	US: Davison, Michigan
Being as an Ocean	2017	US: San Diego, California
Broadside	2020–2025	US: Richmond, Virginia
Crystal Lake	2018–2025	Japan: Tokyo
Currents	2017–2026	US: Newtown, Connecticut
Don Broco	2016–2025	UK: Bedford, England
Holding Absence	2017–2025	UK: Cardiff, Wales
Imminence	2017	Sweden: Trelleborg
Make Out Monday	2018	US: Los Angeles, California
Miss May I	2016–2024	US: Troy, Ohio
Novelists	2017–2020	France: Paris
Of Mice & Men	2021–2025	US: Costa Mesa, California
Of Virtue	2019	US: Lansing, Michigan
Rise of the Northstar	2018	France: Paris
Stray from the Path	2025	US: Long Island
Stuck Out	2020–2022	Australia: Melbourne
While She Sleeps	2017–2018	UK: Sheffield, England

== Releases ==
Album	Type	Artist	Release date
Prepare Consume Proceed (Re-issue)	EP	Loathe	July 8, 2016
Chaos	Studio Album	Attila	November 4, 2016
Automatic (North American Release)	Studio Album	Don Broco	November 11, 2016
WHYDFML	EP	badXchannels	November 18, 2016
Look at Yourself	Studio Album	Emmure	March 3, 2017
This Is Goodbye	Studio Album	Imminence	March 31, 2017
The Cold Sun	Studio Album	Loathe	April 14, 2017
You Are We	Studio Album	While She Sleeps	April 21, 2017
Shadows Inside	Studio Album	Miss May I	June 2, 2017
The Place I Feel Safest	Studio Album	Currents	June 16, 2017
Noir	Studio Album	Novelists	September 8, 2017
Cold Like War	Studio Album	We Came as Romans	October 20, 2017
The Mortal Coil	Studio Album	Polaris	November 3, 2017
Technology	Studio Album	Don Broco	February 2, 2018
This Is as One	Split EP	Loathe/Holding Absence	February 16, 2018
Love Will Kill All	Studio album	Bleeding Through	May 25, 2018
Arms	Studio album	Annisokay	August 17, 2018
Waiting for Morning to Come (Deluxe Edition)	Studio album	Being as an Ocean	September 7, 2018
The Legacy of Shi	Studio album	Rise of the Northstar	October 19, 2018
Visions of Hollywood	Studio album	Make Out Monday	October 26, 2018
Split Series #1	Split EP	Kingsmen/ExitWounds	November 2, 2018
I Let the Devil In	EP	Currents	December 14, 2018
Everyone Around Me	Studio Album	Commonwealth	January 18, 2019
Helix	Studio Album	Crystal Lake	February 15, 2019
Holding Absence	Studio Album	Holding Absence	March 8, 2019
Overpower	Studio Album	Any Given Day	March 15, 2019
Fault	EP	Alpha Wolf	April 19, 2019
C'est La Vie	Studio album	Novelists	January 24, 2020
I Let It In and It Took Everything	Studio album	Loathe	February 7, 2020
The Death of Me	Studio album	Polaris	February 21, 2020
The Way It Ends	Studio album	Currents	June 5, 2020
Hindsight	Studio album	Emmure	June 26, 2020
A Quiet Place to Die	Studio Album	Alpha Wolf	September 25, 2020
The Things They Believe	Studio Album	Loathe	February 7, 2021
The Greatest Mistake of My Life	Studio Album	Holding Absence	April 16, 2021
Lost Souls	Studio Album	Caskets	August 13, 2021
Fragments of a Bitter Memory	Studio Album	Dying Wish	October 1, 2021
Amazing Things	Studio Album	Don Broco	October 22, 2021
Echo	Studio Album	Of Mice & Men	December 3, 2021
The Lost & the Longing	Split EP	Alpha Wolf/Holding Absence	August 15, 2022
Curse of Existence	Studio Album	Miss May I	September 2, 2022
Darkbloom	Studio Album	We Came as Romans	October 14, 2022
Datura	Studio Album	Boston Manor	October 14, 2022
Tear Me to Pieces	Studio Album	Story of the Year	March 10, 2023
Death Below	Studio Album	August Burns Red	March 24, 2023
The Death We Seek	Studio Album	Currents	May 5, 2023
Reflections	Studio Album	Caskets	August 11, 2023
The Noble Art of Self Destruction	Studio Album	Holding Absence	August 23, 2023
Fatalism	Studio album	Polaris	September 1, 2023
Symptoms of Survival	Studio Album	Dying Wish	November 3, 2023
PULSE	EP	LEVELS	February 2, 2024
Half Living Things	Studio Album	Alpha Wolf	April 5, 2024
What's Left Unsaid	Studio album	Foreign Hands	June 21, 2024
Sundiver	Studio Album	Boston Manor	September 6, 2024
Highly Irresponsible	Studio Album	Better Lovers	October 25, 2024
Make Them Suffer	Studio Album	Make Them Suffer	November 8, 2024
Oddworld	Studio Album	Ocean Grove	November 22, 2024
Nine	Studio Album	Bleeding Through	February 14, 2025
Clockworked	Studio Album	Stray from the Path	May 30, 2025
All Is Beautiful... Because We're Doomed	Studio Album	We Came as Romans	August 22, 2025
Flesh Stays Together	Studio Album	Dying Wish	September 26, 2025
The Only Heaven You'll Know	Studio Album	Caskets	November 7, 2025
Bastard Hymns	Studio Album	Excide	November 28, 2025
A.R.S.O.N.	Studio Album	Story of the Year	February 13, 2026
Peace in Place	Studio Album	Poison the Well	March 20, 2026
Chosen Hell	Studio Album	Comeback Kid	November 6, 2026
