= Welcame (album) =

Studio album by Rise of the Northstar
- Released: November 21, 2014
- Recorded: November – December 2013
- Studio: Sainte-Marthe (Paris)
- Genre: Metalcore; heavy hardcore; groove metal; rap metal
- Length: 42:43
- Label: Nuclear Blast
- Producer: Rise of the Northstar

Rise of the Northstar chronology
| Demonstrating My Saiya Style (2012) | Welcame (2014) | The Legacy of Shi (2018) |

Welcame is the debut studio album by French heavy metal and hardcore punk band Rise of the Northstar. It was released on November 21, 2014 by Nuclear Blast.

== Critical reception ==
Professional ratings
Review scores
| Source | Rating |
|---|---|
| Louder Sound | 3.5/5 stars |
| Metal.de | 8/10 |
| Punknews.org | 3.5/5 stars |
| Rock Hard | 9/10 |
| Rock Sound | 6/10 |

Punknews.org praised the first two tracks for displaying the band's mosh-core style and unironic delivery of Japanese pop culture, concluding that, "[I]f you are expecting a groundbreaking, genre-defining release, this is most certainly not it. If you are a fan of all things heavy and want something with a bit of a different spin on what you can bang your head to, then this might be your bag." Garvin Lloyd from Louder Sound commended the album for carrying a junk food quality to their hardcore musicianship and mixing it well with manga iconography, calling it "big, dumb fun at its finest." He concluded that, "While it may make some stomachs turn, the meaty riffs on offer here certainly give you something to get your teeth stuck into." Rock Sound was mixed on the "belligerent, Japanese pop culture-influenced hardcore" style after the first track but said that it will please its existing fanbase more than a casual audience.

== Track listing ==
All lyrics are written by Vithia; all music is composed by Rise of the Northstar, except where noted.

| No. | Title | Length |
|---|---|---|
| 1. | "What the Fuck" | 5:45 |
| 2. | "Welcame (Furyo State of Mind)" | 4:19 |
| 3. | "The New Path" | 3:58 |
| 4. | "Samurai Spirit" | 3:35 |
| 5. | "Dressed All in Black" | 4:43 |
| 6. | "Again and Again" | 4:31 |
| 7. | "Tyson" | 3:01 |
| 8. | "Bosozoku" | 3:44 |
| 9. | "Simon Says (Cover Song)" (Monch Chichi) | 3:23 |
| 10. | "Authentic" | 2:44 |
| 11. | "Blast 'Em All" | 4:00 |
| Total length: | | 42:43 |

== Personnel ==
Adapted from the liner notes of Welcame.

Rise of the Northstar

- Vithia – vocals
- Eva-B – lead guitar
- Air One – rhythm guitar
- Fabulous Fab – bass guitar
- Hokuto No Kev – drums

Background vocals

- Pegaz
- Lucas
- Thibault
- Seb
- Julien
- Big Tom
- Marty
- Doom
- Soufiene
- ROTNS

Production

- Zeuss – mixing, mastering

Artwork

- Vithia – art direction, illustration and design
- Berzerker – photography

== Charts ==
| Chart (2014) | Peak position |
|---|---|
| Belgian Albums (Ultratop Wallonia) | 192 |
