= A Quiet Place to Die =

Studio album by Alpha Wolf
- Released: 25 September 2020
- Genre: Metalcore; nu metal
- Length: 36:15
- Label: Greyscale; SharpTone
- Producer: Lance Prenc

Alpha Wolf chronology
| Mono (2017) | A Quiet Place to Die (2020) | Half Living Things (2024) |

Singles from A Quiet Place to Die
- 1. "Akudama" Released: 2 June 2020; 2. "Creep" Released: 22 July 2020; 3. "Bleed 4 You" Released: August 12, 2020

A Quiet Place to Die is the second studio album by the Australian metalcore band Alpha Wolf. It was released on 25 September 2020 through Greyscale Records and SharpTone Records. The first single "Akudama" was released on 2 June 2020, followed by another single "Creep" which was released on 22 July 2020, and "Bleed 4 You" on August 12, 2020. The album debuted at No. 6 on the ARIA Albums Chart in its first week of release.

== Critical reception ==
Professional ratings
Review scores
| Source | Rating |
|---|---|
| Distorted Sound Magazine | 8/10 stars |
| Kerrang! | 4/5 stars |
| The New Fury | 10/10 |
| Wall of Sound | 9/10 |

A Quiet Place to Die received generally positive reviews, with Kris Pugh of Distorted Sound Magazine giving it an 8 out of 10, saying the album "isn’t just a statement of the band’s true arrival, but is one of the great extreme/hardcore records of recent memory."

== Track listing ==
All tracks are written by Alpha Wolf.

| No. | Title | Length |
|---|---|---|
| 1. | "A Quiet Place to Die" | 2:27 |
| 2. | "Creep" | 2:57 |
| 3. | "Golden Fate; Isolate" | 3:19 |
| 4. | "Akudama" | 2:38 |
| 5. | "Acid Romance" | 3:17 |
| 6. | "Rot in Pieces" | 2:57 |
| 7. | "Bleed 4 You" (featuring Lizi Blanco) | 3:58 |
| 8. | "Ultra-Violet Violence" | 3:25 |
| 9. | "The Mind Bends to a Will of Its Own" | 3:03 |
| 10. | "Restricted (R18+)" | 3:17 |
| 11. | "Don't Ask..." | 5:01 |
| Total length: | | 36:15 |

== Personnel ==
Alpha Wolf

- Lochie Keogh – lead vocals
- John Arnold – bass, vocals
- Sabian Lynch – guitars
- Scottie Simpson – guitars
- Mitch Fogarty – drums

Additional personnel

- Lizi Blanco – vocals on track 7

Production

- Lance Prenc – mastering, mixing

== Charts ==
| Chart (2020) | Peak position |
|---|---|
| Australia (ARIA) | 6 |

== Awards ==
| Year | Nominee / work | Award | Result | Ref. |
|---|---|---|---|---|
| 2021 | A Quiet Place to Die | ARIA Award for Best Hard Rock or Heavy Metal Album | Nominated | |
