= Showdown (Rise of the Northstar album) =

Studio album by Rise of the Northstar
- Released: April 7, 2023
- Genres: Metalcore; groove metal; thrash metal; nu metal; hardcore punk
- Length: 35:34
- Label: Atomic Fire

Rise of the Northstar chronology
The Legacy of Shi (2018)	Showdown (2023)	Chapter 4: Red Falcon Super Battle! Neo Paris War!! (2025)

Singles from Showdown
- 1. "One Love" Released: 21 January 2023; 2. "Showdown" Released: 17 March 2023; 3. "Crank It Up" Released: 18 June 2024

Professional ratings
Review scores
Source	Rating
Distorted Sound	8/10
Noizze	7/10
Metal.de	8/10

Showdown is the third studio album by French heavy metal/hardcore punk band Rise of the Northstar. It was released on 7 April 2023, through Atomic Fire records.

== Background ==
In February 2022, the band went on a hiatus following allegations of domestic violence against their bassist, Fabien Lahaye. The band had indicated that Lahaye had initiated legal proceedings.

Rise of the Northstar announced on January 20, 2023, that they reformed and that their third studio album would be called Showdown, along with its release date. That same day, they also released the music video for new single "One Love".

== Reception ==
The album was met with positive reception. Metal.de wrote "You have to listen to the album a bit to get a feel for it and sort out the individual elements; fundamentally, however, *Showdown* is an album that gets things moving. This is borne out by the fact that most of the songs operate at a mid-tempo pace, with only a few outliers venturing into faster, punchier territory. Yet, as seen on "Clan," the music also shifts into more measured realms—making a powerful impression with wonderful guitar solos—and clearly demonstrates that *Showdown* offers far more than just brash hardcore. So, when RISE OF THE NORTHSTAR make their virtual ring entrance—as described earlier—and are hailed by the crowd, it is entirely deserved."

== Track listing ==
No.	Title	Length
1.	"The Anthem"	1:00
2.	"Showdown"	4:11
3.	"Third Strike"	3:40
4.	"Crank It Up"	3:34
5.	"One Love"	3:23
6.	"Shogun No Shi"	3:26
7.	"Clan"	5:05
8.	"Raijin"	3:23
9.	"Golden Arrow"	3:52
10.	"Rise [ライズ]"	4:00
Total length:		35:34

== Personnel ==
Rise of the Northstar

- Victor "Vithia" Leroy – lead vocals
- Brice "Eva-B" Gauthier – guitar
- Erwan "Air One" Menez – rhythm guitar
- Alexis "Yoru" Lieu – bass guitar
- Kevin "Phantom" Foley – drums

== Charts ==
Chart (2023)	Peak position
French Charts (SNEP)	74
German (Offizielle Top 100)	73
