= Mono (Alpha Wolf album) =

Studio album by Alpha Wolf
- Released: 14 July 2017
- Genre: Metalcore; nu metalcore; beatdown hardcore
- Length: 37:38
- Label: Greyscale
- Producer: Jamie Marinos

Alpha Wolf chronology
Dark Soul (2015)	''Mono'' (2017)	A Quiet Place to Die (2020)

Singles from Mono
- 1. "#104" Released: 13 March 2017; 2. "Golden Fate; Gut Ache" Released: 29 May 2017; 3. "Ward of the State" Released: 21 June 2017; 4. "Golden Fate; Water Break" Released: 9 July 2017

Mono is the debut studio album by the Australian metalcore band Alpha Wolf. It was released on 14 July 2017 through Greyscale Records. The first single "#104" was released on 13 March 2017, followed by another single "Golden Fate; Gut Ache" which was released on 30 May 2017, along with the pre-order for the album. The album debuted at No. 29 on the ARIA Albums Chart in its first week of release.

It is the only album to feature former vocalist Aidan Ellaz before his departure from the band in February 2018, following allegations of sexual assault. It is also the last release to feature founding member Jackson Arnold on drums.

== Critical reception ==
Professional ratings
Review scores
Source	Rating
Depth Mag	10/10 stars
New-Transcendence	9.5/10 stars
Heavy Mag	4/5 stars
Kill Your Stereo	75/100
Hysteria Mag	6/10 stars

Reviews for Mono were generally positive. Depth Magazine gave the album a 10 out of 10, calling it "a brave expression of intense and real emotion at its heavy finest. Impressively done."

== Track listing ==
All tracks are written by Alpha Wolf

No.	Title	Length
1.	"Ward of the State"	2:04
2.	"No. 2"	3:31
3.	"Golden Fate; Water Break"	3:40
4.	"Shinobi Naku"	1:49
5.	"#104"	3:16
6.	"Promise Stays (Ft. Alana Sibbison)"	3:00
7.	"Mono"	2:33
8.	"Failvre"	3:28
9.	"Golden Fate; Gut Ache"	3:15
10.	"My Untold Memoir"	2:03
11.	"Epiphobia"	2:12
12.	"Devon St"	3:21
13.	"In a Sense (Vinyl Exclusive)"	3:26

== Personnel ==
Alpha Wolf

- Aidan Ellaz – lead vocals
- John Arnold – bass, vocals
- Sabian Lynch – guitars
- Scottie Simpson – guitars
- Jackson Arnold – drums

Additional artists

- Alana Sibbison – vocals on Track 6
- Debennie Randall – spoken-word vocals on Track 3 & Track 9

Artwork

- Milad Safabakhsh – artwork (Credited to Nick Davies, who stole the design)

Production

- Jamie Marinos – production, engineered
- Lance Prenc – mastering, mixing

== Charts ==
Chart (2017)	Peak position
Australia (ARIA)	29
