= Novelists (band) =

French metalcore band

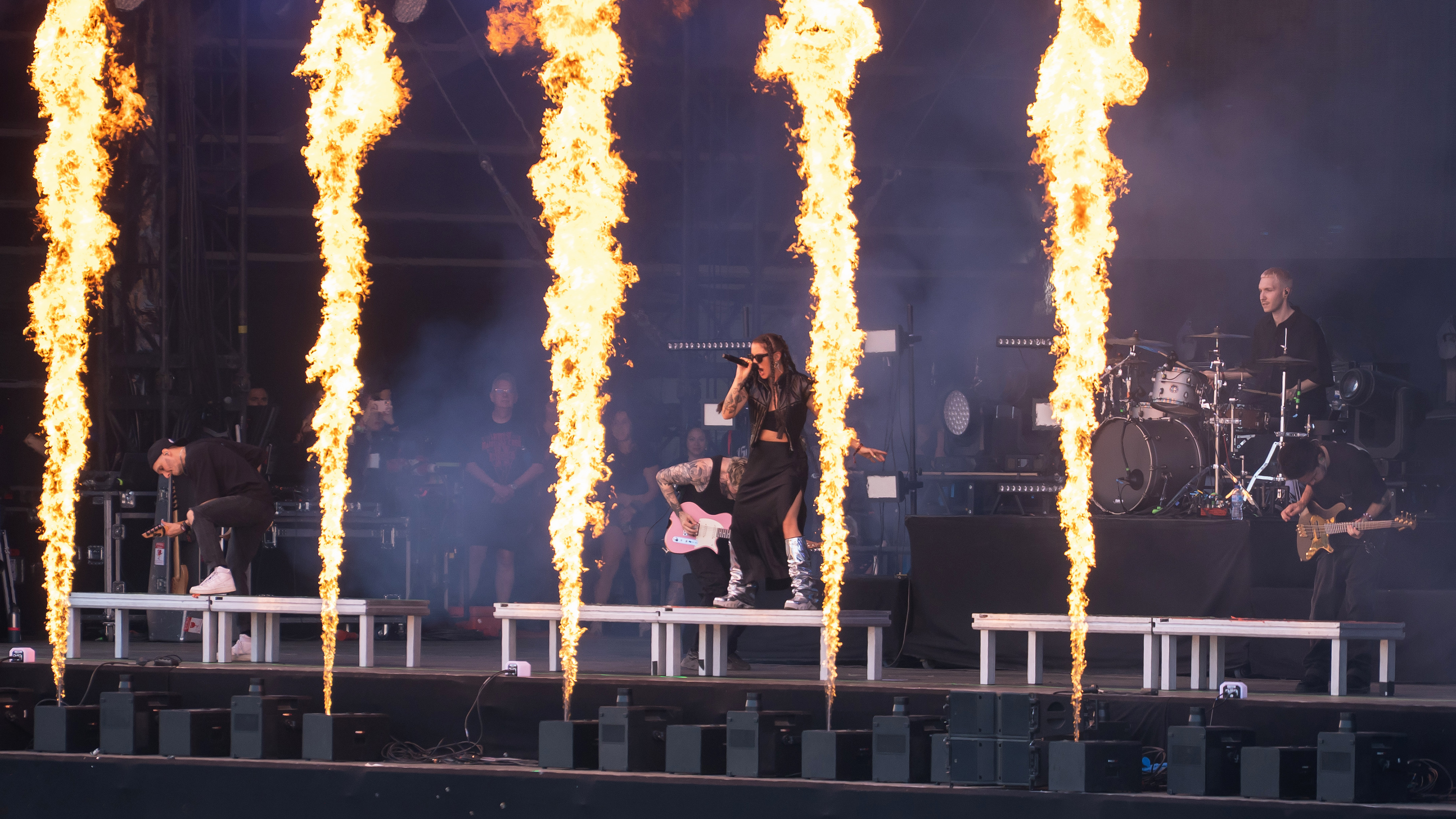
- Novelists performing in 2025

Background information
- Origin: Paris, France
- Genres: Metalcore; progressive metal; djent
- Years active: 2013–present
- Labels: Arising Empire (2015–2017); SharpTone (2017–2020); Out of Line (2020–2024); ACKOR Music (2025–present)
- Members: Nicolas Delestrade; Amael Durand; Florestan Durand; Pierre Danel; Camille Contreras
- Past members: Matteo Gelsomino; Charles-Henri Teule; Tobias Rische

Novelists (often stylised as Novelists FR) are a French metalcore band from Paris, formed in 2013 by brothers Amael and Florestan Durand. They released three studio albums on Arising Empire and SharpTone Records, then joined Out of Line Music in 2020. After two vocalist changes, the group introduced Camille Contreras in 2023, released the EP Okapi in 2024, and published their fifth studio album, CODA, in 2025, through their artist-run label ACKOR Music.

== History ==
=== 2013–2020: Early years and C'est La Vie ===
Brothers Amael (drums) and Florestan Durand (guitar) founded Novelists in late 2013 with vocalist Matteo Gelsomino, bassist Nicolas Delestrade, and guitarist Charles-Henri Teule. A self-released demo EP (2014) led to the debut full-length Souvenirs (2015) on Arising Empire, which was followed by Noir in 2017, on SharpTone Records. The band's third album, C'est La Vie, came out in January 2020, earning praise from Kerrang! for its "emotion-soaked riffing".

=== 2020–2022: vocalist change and Déjà Vu ===
Gelsomino left in April 2020. Former Alazka frontman Tobias Rische joined that October, coinciding with a deal with Out of Line Music. In May 2022, the band supported the Swedish metalcore band Imminence on their European tour, played the UK's Tech-Fest in June–July, and released their fourth studio album, Déjà Vu, in November, which was preceded by several singles, including "Heretic", which featured LANDMVRKS vocalist Florent Salfati.

=== 2023–present: Camille Contreras, Okapi, and CODA ===
Vocalist Rische departed Novelists in April 2023. After open auditions, the band selected Camille Contreras, debuting her on the track "Turn It Up". The four-track EP Okapi followed on 9 May 2024.

In January 2025, Novelists, together with their French metalcore fellows LANDMVRKS, announced the creation of the record label ACKOR Music. They also released the single "All for Nothing" and revealed their upcoming studio album, CODA. A second single, "Say My Name", came out on 20 March, ahead of the album's release on 16 May.

Novelists are featured on the 2026 track "Where to Find Me" by Bilmuri, from his album Kinda Hard.

In May 2026, the band embarked on a North American tour supporting Dance Gavin Dance, alongside the Fall of Troy and Wolf & Bear.

== Musical style ==
The band's sound has been described as metalcore, with guitar styles heavily inspired by progressive metal and djent.

== Band members ==
Current

- Nicolas Delestrade – bass, backing vocals (2013–present)
- Amael Durand – drums (2013–present)
- Florestan Durand – lead guitar, backing vocals (2013–present)
- Pierre Danel – rhythm guitar (2021–present)
- Camille Contreras – lead vocals (2023–present)

Past

- Matteo Gelsomino – lead vocals (2013–2020)
- Charles-Henri Teule – rhythm guitar (2013–2018)
- Tobias Rische – lead vocals (2020–2023)

Timeline

== Discography ==
=== Studio albums ===
Year	Title	Label
2015	Souvenirs	Arising Empire
2017	Noir	SharpTone
2020	C'est La Vie	SharpTone
2022	Déjà Vu	Out of Line
2025	CODA	ACKOR Music

=== EPs ===
Year	Title	Label
2014	Demo EP	Self-released
2024	Okapi	Out of Line

=== Singles ===
Year	Single
2015	"Gravity"
2017	"The Light, the Fire"
2018	"Eyes Wide Shut"
2020	"After the Rain"
2020	"Lost Cause"
2021	"Terrorist"
2021	"Do You Really Wanna Know?"
2022	"Smoke Signals"
2022	"Heretic"
2023	"Turn It Up"
2023	"Prisoner"
2023	"Mourning the Dawn"
2024	"Coda"
2025	"All for Nothing"
2025	"Say My Name"
2026	"Ravage"
