= Foreign Hands =

American band

- Origin: Wilmington, Delaware, United States
- Genres: Metalcore
- Years active: 2009-present
- Labels: SharpTone, DAZE
- Members: Tyler Norris: Jack Beatson; Gill Gonzalez; Chuck Minix; Tyler Washington
- Past members: Arthur Parker: Justin Olson

Foreign Hands are a metalcore band from Wilmington, Delaware, formed in 2009. The band consists of lead vocalist Tyler Norris, rhythm guitarist and clean vocalist Jack Beatson, lead guitarist and backing vocalist Gill Gonzalez, bassist Chuck Minix, and drummer Tyler Washington.

The band released their first album No Funeral For The Spirit in 2016 before releasing their Fall EP on December 1, 2017. The year after, in 2018, they released a summer promotional tape (which was remastered in 2021 with an additional third track), before releasing their split EP with Cast in Blood titled Lapsed Requiems in 2019. On February 18, 2022, they released their EP Bleed the Dream through DAZE Records. Later that same year, they signed with SharpTone Records and released their fourth EP, Lucid Noise on October 19. The band released their second studio album, What's Left Unsaid, on June 21, 2024.

Tyler Norris is also in the Washington D.C.-based metalcore outfit Wristmeetrazor.

== Musical style ==
The band's heavy yet melodic sound is noted to emulate that of metalcore bands from the late 1990s and early 2000s, with influences coming from such as Poison the Well, Hopesfall, Misery Signals, and 7 Angels 7 Plagues.

== Members ==
=== Current ===
- Tyler Norris - lead vocals
- Jack Beatson - rhythm guitar, clean vocals
- Gill Gonzalez - lead guitar, backing vocals
- Chuck Minix - bass
- Tyler Washington - drums

=== Former ===
- Arthur Parker - bass
- Justin Olson - drums

== Discography ==
=== Studio albums ===
- No Funeral For The Spirit (2016)
- What's Left Unsaid (2024)

=== Extended plays ===
- Fall (2017)
- Lapsed Requiems (split w/Cast in Blood) (2019)
- Bleed the Dream (2022)
- Lucid Noise (2022)

=== Compilations ===
- Summer Promo '18 (2018)
