= Alpha Wolf (band) =

Australian metalcore band

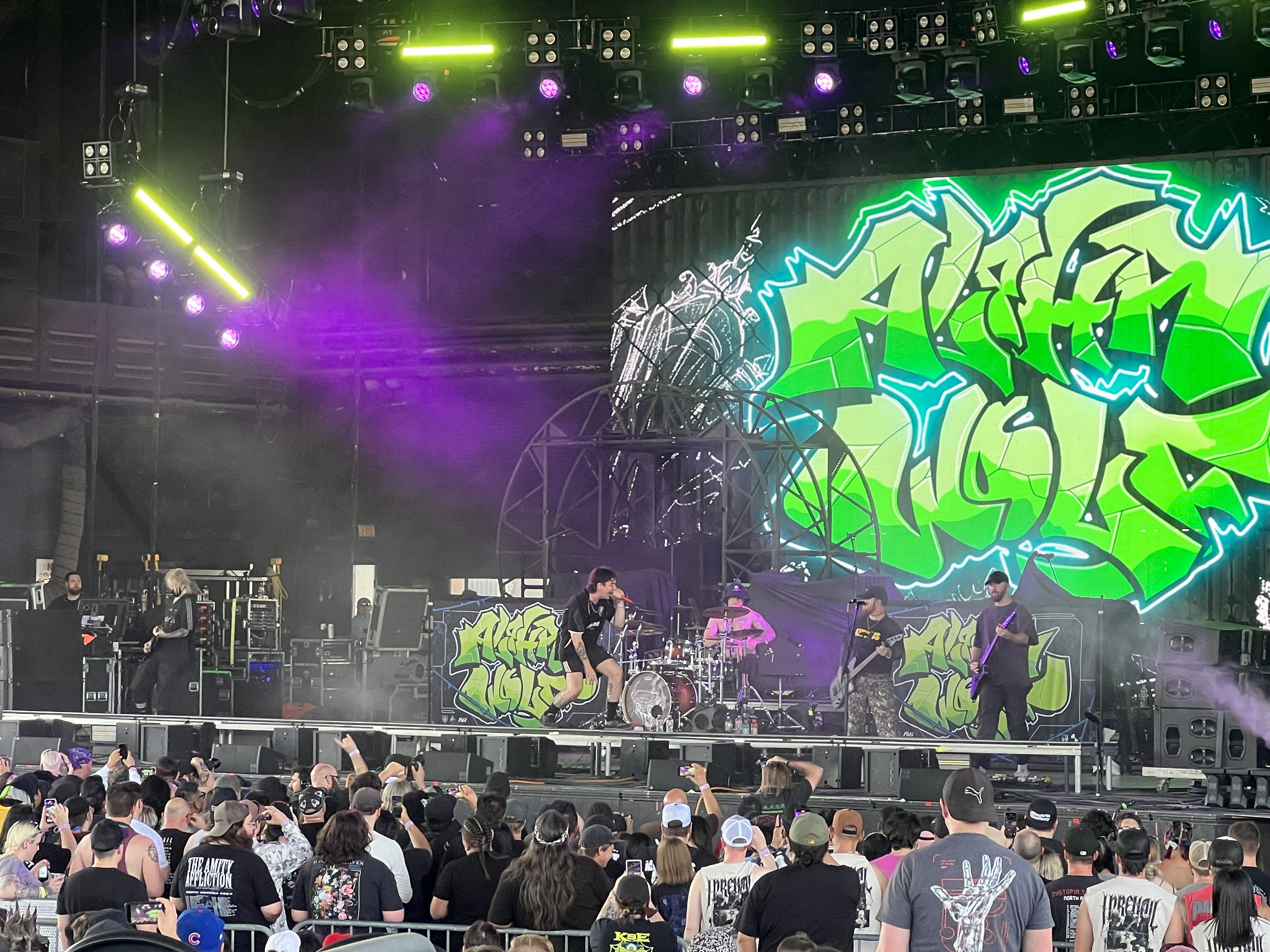
- Alpha Wolf at Talking Stick Resort Amphitheatre for the Summer of Loud 2025 Tour in Phoenix

Background information
- Origin: Burnie, Tasmania, Australia
- Genres: Metalcore; nu metal; beatdown hardcore
- Years active: 2013–present
- Labels: Greyscale; SharpTone
- Members: Sabian Lynch; Scottie Simpson; Mitch Fogarty; John Arnold
- Past members: Hayden Dargavel; Lloyd Hornidge; Aidan Ellaz; Jackson Arnold; Lochie Keogh

Alpha Wolf are an Australian metalcore band originally from Burnie, Tasmania, and currently located in Melbourne, Victoria. Bassist and founding vocalist John Arnold stated that "the name Alpha Wolf came from the movie The Grey". Their debut album Mono was released in July 2017 and peaked at number 29 on the ARIA Albums Chart.

== Biography ==
=== 2013–2016: Formation and Origin ===
The band formed in 2013 and released their debut EP Origin on 9 June 2014. The EP was preceded by three singles and nearly an entire album's worth of (currently lost) songs.

=== 2017–2018: Mono and line-up change ===
In July 2017, the band's 2017 released its debut studio album titled, Mono. This is short for monochromatic, which means, "involving or producing visual images in a single color or in varying tones of a single color". This title and its association tease the lyrical content which deals strongly in themes of trauma and depression.

On 9 February 2018, MusicFeeds reported lead vocalist Aidan Ellaz was ejected from the band due to allegations of sexual assault.

In June 2018, Lochie Keogh and Mitch Fogarty were announced as new members.

=== 2019–2023: Fault and A Quiet Place to Die ===
In April 2019, the band released Fault EP, with guitarist Sabian Lynch saying "Fault is our way of opening up, and doing our best to show that it's okay to mess up, it's okay to fail, it's okay [to] make mistakes, as long as we can find ways grow from it. We always want to be honest with our song writing and these songs showcase a realisation within ourselves, thus creating the best music we've ever been a part of."

The band's second studio album, A Quiet Place to Die was released on 25 September 2020.

The band released the EP, Shh, on 31 March 2023.

=== 2024–present: Half Living Things ===
In January 2024, the band released a single, "Sucks 2 Suck", which features Ice-T. The song is the second single from the band's third studio album Half Living Things.

In the Summer of 2025, Alpha Wolf joined the Amity Affliction and the Devil Wears Prada as special guests for the Summer of Loud 2025 Tour headlined by Beartooth, Parkway Drive, Killswitch Engage, and I Prevail, with TX2, Kingdom of Giants, and Dark Divine as the opening acts.

The band made an appearance at Welcome to Rockville, which took place in Daytona Beach, Florida, in May 2026.

The band announced in August 2026 that they parted ways with longtime vocalist Lochie Keogh and cancelled their remaining shows of 2026.

== Band members ==
Current

- Sabian Lynch – rhythm guitar (2013–present), lead guitar (2013–2015, 2026–present), backing vocals (2026–present)
- John Arnold – bass, backing vocals (2016–2026), lead vocals (2013–2016, 2026–present)
- Scottie Simpson – lead guitar (2016–present), bass (2015–2016, 2026–present)
- Mitch Fogarty – drums (2018–present)

Former

- Hayden Dargavel – bass (2013–2015)
- Jackson Arnold – drums (2013–2017)
- Lloyd Hornidge – lead guitar (2015–2016)
- Aidan Ellaz Holmes – lead vocals (2016–2018)
- Lochie Keogh – lead vocals (2018–2026)

== Discography ==
=== Studio albums ===
Title	Details	Peak chart positions
Title	Details	AUS
Mono	Released: 14 July 2017; Label: Greyscale (GSRCD005); Format: CD, digital download, streaming	29
A Quiet Place to Die	Released: 25 September 2020; Label: Greyscale (GSRCD038), Sharptone; Format: CD, digital download, LP	6
Half Living Things	Released: 5 April 2024; Label: Greyscale (GSRCD087); Format: CD, digital download, LP	19

=== Extended plays ===
Title	Details
Origin	Released: 9 June 2014; Label: Alpha Wolf (ALP002); Format: CD, digital download, streaming
Fault	Released: 19 April 2019; Label: Greyscale Records (GSRCD014); Format: CD, LP, streaming
The Lost & the Longing	Released: 15 August 2022; Label: Greyscale Records, SharpTone Records; Format: Music download; Notes: Split EP with Holding Absence
Shh	Released: 31 March 2023; Label: Greyscale Records, SharpTone Records; Format: Music download

=== Singles ===
==== As lead artist ====
Year	Title	Album
2014	"Death Bringer"	Origin
2014	"I Am; Horror"	Origin
2015	"Dark Soul"	non album single
2016	"Blkrchrds"	non album single
2016	"Nail Biter"	non album single
2017	"#104"	Mono
2017	"Ward of the State"	Mono
2017	"Golden Fate; Water Break"	Mono
2018	"Black Mamba"	non album single
2018	"No Name"	Fault
2019	"Sub-Zero"	Fault
2020	"Akudama"	A Quiet Place to Die
2020	"Creep"	A Quiet Place to Die
2020	"Bleed 4 You"	A Quiet Place to Die
2020	"Restricted (R18+)"	A Quiet Place to Die
2021	"Bleed 4 You" (Lo-Fi Remix; with Mik)	Shh
2022	"Aching Longing" (with Holding Absence)	The Lost & the Longing
2022	"Hotel Underground"	The Lost & the Longing
2023	"60cm of Steel" (Lo-Fi Remix; with Mik)	Shh
2023	"Bring Back the Noise"	Half Living Things
2024	"Sucks 2 Suck" (featuring Ice T)	Half Living Things
2024	"Whenever You're Ready"	Half Living Things
2024	"Cannibal" (with RedHook)	

==== As featured artist ====
Title	Year	Album
"Drag Me Under" (Blessthefall featuring Alpha Wolf)	2024	Gallows

== Awards ==
=== AIR Awards ===
The Australian Independent Record Awards (commonly known informally as AIR Awards) is an annual awards night to recognise, promote and celebrate the success of Australia's Independent Music sector.

Year	Nominee / work	Award	Result	Ref.
2020	Fault	Best Independent Heavy Album or EP	Nominated	

=== APRA Awards ===
The APRA Awards are held in Australia and New Zealand by the Australasian Performing Right Association to recognise songwriting skills, sales and airplay performance by its members annually.

Year	Nominee / work	Award	Result	Ref.
2024	"60cm of Steel" by Alpha Wolf & Holding Absence	Most Performed Hard Rock / Heavy Metal Work	Nominated	

=== ARIA Music Awards ===
The ARIA Music Awards is an annual ceremony presented by Australian Recording Industry Association (ARIA), which recognise excellence, innovation, and achievement across all genres of the music of Australia. They commenced in 1987.

Year	Nominee / work	Award	Result	Ref.
2021	A Quiet Place to Die	Best Hard Rock or Heavy Metal Album	Nominated	

=== Berlin Music Video Awards ===
The Berlin Music Video Awards is an international music festival that promotes the art of music videos. As of 2025 there are 17 categories running.

Year	Nominee / work	Award	Result
2021	AKUDAMA	Best Editor	Nominated
