= God Complex (band) =

English hardcore punk band

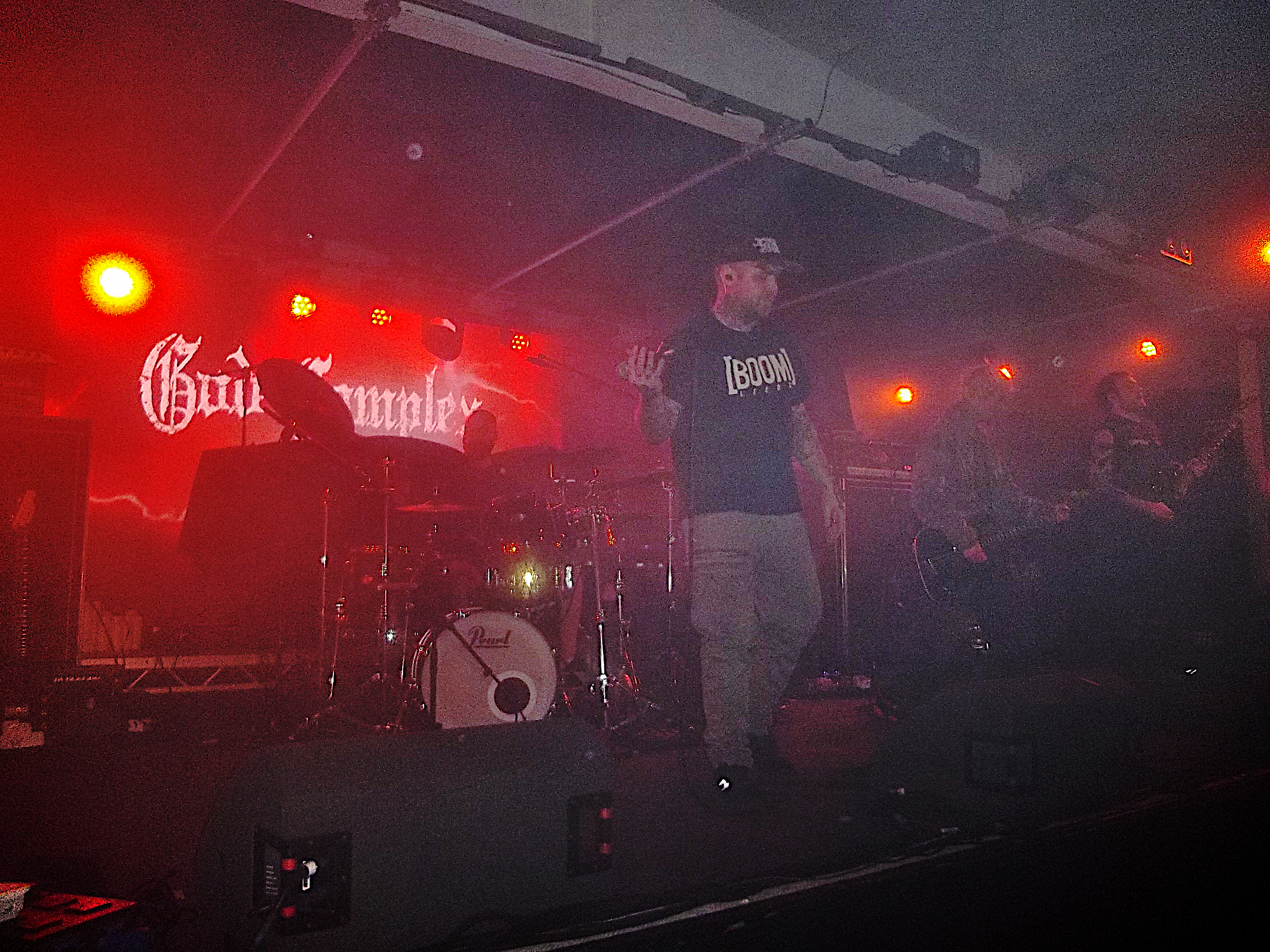
- God Complex performing live in 2026

Background information
- Origin: Liverpool, Merseyside, U.K.
- Genres: Metalcore; hardcore punk
- Years active: 2017–2022; 2024–present
- Labels: Venn, SharpTone
- Spinoff of: Our Imbalance
- Members: Harry Rule; Danny Skarratts; Kyle Holt; Luke Lomas; Sam Morris; James Lyon
- Past members: Danny Taylor; Alex Chan
- Website: godcomplex.uk

God Complex is an English hardcore punk band from Liverpool. Formed in 2017 by James Lyon (drums), Kyle Holt (guitar, vocals), Danny Taylor (vocals) and Alex Chan (bass). Shortly after the bands inception, Danny Taylor left and was replaced by former Our Imbalance vocalist Harry Rule, they released their debut EP Created Sick in 2018. In 2020, Alex Chan (bass) departed and bass duties went to Kyle Holt, guitar duties were picked up by Danny Skarratts. In 2021, they released their debut album To Decay in a Deathless World, then disbanded in February 2022. In 2024, they reunited with the addition of Luke Lomas (guitar) and Sam Morris (bass). In 2025, they released their second EP He Watches in Silence.

== History ==
God Complex was formed in 2017 by Harry Rule (vocals), James Lyon (drums), Kyle Holt (guitar, vocals) and Alex Chan (bass), who met through friends. In a 2018 interview, Rule stated that formed with the intention of creating "straight up, no-bullshit, aggressive hardcore, and that just wasn’t being addressed in the UK". Between 11 and 16 November, they toured the UK supporting Venom Prison. Rule had been the founding vocalist of Our Imbalance, a band who, following his departure, would change their name to Loathe. On 9 November 2017, they released their debut single "Hate Runs Through Me". On 18 January 2018, they released the single "Insignificant". In February 2018, they supported Loathe and Holding Absence on some dates of the UK co-headline tour.

On 5 October 2018, they released their debut EP Created Sick, through Venn Records. 12 October 2018, they released the single "Slumlord". That month, they toured the U.K. with Puppy and King 810. On 15 August 2019, they released a live session with Live at the Lab. In February 2020, they supported Loathe on their UK tour headline tour, alongside The Well Runs Red and Phoxjaw.

In 2021, they announced that their debut album To Decay In A Deathless World would be released on 7 October. At the same time, they announced the band's disbandment. They performed their final show at Liverpool venue Zanzibar on 19 February 2022. Throughout the whole set, Loathe guitarist Erik Bickerstaffe played drums. Vocalists interchanged each song, including Loathe's Kadeem France, Static Dress' Olli Appleyard, Love is Noise's Cameron Humphrey, Creak's Jack Dunn and Cthulhu's Michael Page. During this time, Rule became vocalist for Blood Youth.

On 29 December 2024, they announced that they had reunited, with a lineup of Rule (vocals), Danny Skarratts (guitar), Holt (guitar), Luke Lomas (guitar), Sam Morris (bass) and Lyon (drums). At the same time, they released the single "Salt and Ash". On 31 January 2025, they released the single "Depraved Idol", announcing it would be a part of their EP He Watches In Silence, released on SharpTone Records on 21 February.

== Musical style ==
Critics have categorised God Complex's music as metalcore and hardcore punk. They incorporate elements of doom metal, progressive metal, mathcore, death metal, groove metal, deathcore, djent, black metal, sludge metal and nu metal. Their music makes use of blast beats, breakdowns chugging riffs, rhythmic sections, atmospheric elements eerie, melodic guitar leads guitars and chaotic elements. Their vocals are often screamed, using different techniques, including varying pitches. Sometimes, vocals are stylised like those in deathcore while others are similar to death metal. Following their reunion, Rule began to increasingly experimental with vocal techniques.

They have cited influences including Nails, Knocked Loose, Jesus Piece, Kublai Khan, Pantera, Alice in Chains and Black Sabbath. In a 2018 interview with Atom Smasher, each member listed their favourite albums as Counterparts' Tragedy Will Find Us, Varials' Pain Again, Nas' Illmatic and Machine Head's Burn My Eyes. In a 2025 interview, Rule stated that since childhood, he and Erik Bickerstaffe from Loathe have musically "influenced each other... him influencing me bit more because he's ridiculous".

Their first EP Created Sick (2018) was gloom metal, a genre they helped to pioneer, alongside Loathe and Lotus Eater. The genre is characterised by the merger of elements of hardcore punk and metalcore, djent-inspired riffing and horror atmospherics. NME and Hysteria magazine noted them as a forefront band in a new wave of heavy music in Britain in the 2010s, alongside Lotus Eater, Modern Error, Holding Absence and Loathe. Boolin Tunes writer Nicholas Hayley called them "One of the UK’s most visceral yet largely underappreciated metalcore acts" and "one of my most cherished acts in the UK underground scene".

They have been cited as an influence by Graphic Nature. In 2021, Olli Appleyard, vocalist of Static Dress, called To Decay In A Deathless World "hands down the best heavy record of the entire year, and I will happily fight anyone to prove them wrong."

== Discography ==
Studio albums

- To Decay in a Deathless World (2021)

EPs

- Created Sick (2018)
- He Watches in Silence (2025)

As a featured artist

- "Broken Vision Rhythm" by Loathe

== Members ==
Current

- Harry Rule – vocals (2017–2022; 2024–present)
- Kyle Holt – guitar (2017–2022; 2024–present)
- James Lyon – drums (2017–2021; 2024–present)
- Danny Skarratts – guitar (2020–present)
- Sam Morris – bass (2024–present)
- Luke Lomas – guitar (2024–present)

Former

- Danny Taylor – vocals (2017)
- Alex Chan – bass (2017–2020)
