= Graphic Nature =

British nu metalcore band

- Also known as: Cove
- Origin: Kent, England
- Genre: Nu metalcore
- Years active: 2018–present
- Labels: Rude; Century Media
- Members: Harvey Freeman; Pete Woolven; Matas Michaliovskis; Charlie Smith; Jack Bowdery

Graphic Nature (formerly Cove) are a British nu metalcore band, based in Kent, England. The band's style mixes nu metal and metalcore with influences of electronic music, whilst its lyrics are themed around mental health. After self-releasing four singles, the band signed to Rude Records in 2021. The band released their debut album A Mind Waiting to Die in 2023, which they supported with performances at the 2000trees, Download, Reading & Leeds and Misery Loves Company festivals. Their second album, Who Are You When No One is Watching?, was released on 12 July 2024.

== History ==
=== 2018–2021: Formation and early singles ===
The band was formed under the name Cove. They were formed in mid-2018 by vocalist Harvey Freeman, guitarists Pete Woolven and Matas Michaliovskis, bassist Charlie Smith and drummer Jack Bowdery. Whilst Freeman is from London, the other members of the band are based in Kent, England. The band took their name from the Deftones song of the same name, from their seventh album Koi No Yokan (2012). Over the course of a year, the band wrote between five or ten songs in a variety of styles, ranging from metalcore to hardcore. After Woolven sent the band a rough demo of "Grit", they decided to pursue a nu metal sound. In 2022, Freeman told Rock Sound:

Nu metal was such a big influence on us [...] We were playing music we didn't love as much as the music we grew up with, and if you're not playing something you enjoy then what's the point [in] playing it? So we decided to put more 90's riffs into it, and more electronics.

Graphic Nature released their debut single, "Grit", on 21 August 2019. By February 2020, the band had released two more singles, "Mortal Fear" and "De[in]fect", and played a number of shows supporting larger bands including Creature, Gassed Up, Heart of a Coward, Lock & Key, Monasteries, MTXS and Palm Reader. Of the reception to Graphic Nature's music, Freeman said that the audiences they played to "either fucking [loved] it or [had] no idea what to do." The band began writing material again in 2020 during the COVID-19 pandemic lockdowns, with the plan of releasing two EPs in one year. Freeman said that the lockdowns helped the band's members "find [their] own segments", and it inspired him to write about his experiences and challenges with mental health and isolation during the pandemic. In August 2021, Graphic Nature signed to Rude Records, who reissued the band's back catalog of singles.

=== 2022–present: A Mind Waiting to Die and Who Are You When No One is Watching? ===
On 25 February 2022, Graphic Nature released their debut EP, New Skin. During 2022, the band played shows with Employed to Serve, Ho99o9, Cancer Bats, Witch Fever, Vended, Vexed and SeeYouSpaceCowboy. By the time the EP was released, the band were already working on new material in the studio, and the planned second EP was turned into the band's debut album, A Mind Waiting to Die. The band planned on releasing the album at the end of 2022, but it was pushed back due to Slipknot releasing an album in September of that year. It was released on 17 February 2023, receiving mixed-to-positive reviews from critics. Kerrang! and Rock Sound both listed the album as one of the best of 2023. Following its release, Graphic Nature performed at the 2023 editions of the 2000trees, Download, Reading & Leeds and Misery Loves Company festivals.

On 4 April 2024, Graphic Nature announced their second album Who Are You When No One is Watching? and released the single "To the Grave". The album was partially inspired by Freeman's struggles with PTSD after he was physically assaulted in early 2023. The band wrote the album quickly after the release of their first as they were on a creative spree; by the time of its announcement, some of their songs were still untitled and/or unmixed. It was released on 12 July 2024. In July 2024, the band embarked on a headlining tour in the leadup to the Radar Festival in Manchester. In August, Graphic Nature performed at the Heavy Music Awards 2024, where A Mind Waiting to Die won the "Best Breakthrough Album" award. In October and November 2025, the band supported Stray from the Path on their final tour of the United Kingdom and Europe.

In April 2026, Graphic Nature announced they had signed to Century Media Records with the release of the single "Faceless". In August, they performed for the second time at Radar Festival, along with their first ever main stage appearance at a major festival at Bloodstock Open Air. The band also headlined the Metal for Good stage on the second day of Takedown Festival 2026.

== Musical style and themes ==
Graphic Nature have been described nu metalcore, and as nu metal and metalcore separately. In his review of A Mind Waiting to Die, Tim Bolitho-Jones of Distorted Sound noted a "techno/electronica edge to [the band's sound] reminiscent of the likes of Pitchshifter and Senser." Metal Hammer also noted the album's use of electronic samples. Freeman has described the band's music as "a mix of nu metal and hardcore with some garage and [drum and bass] influences", and said that its members were collectively influenced by 90's nu metal bands including Korn, Deftones, Ill Niño, Limp Bizkit, P.O.D. and Slipknot. Additional influences include film soundtracks and the Kingdom Hearts and Final Fantasy video game series. Other influences they have cited include Holding Absence, Loathe, Lotus Eater, MTXS, God Complex, My Ticket Home, Ocean Grove, Black Coast, Vein.fm, Jesus Piece, End, Palm Reader, Static Dress, Phoxjaw, Centuries, Transplants, Beastie Boys, Creature, Starved and Aphex Twin. The band's lyrics, drawn from Freeman's personal experiences, are centered around mental health, addressing subjects including anxiety, loneliness, depression, suicide and neurodivergence.

The band's creative process begins with Pete Woolven writing guitar parts with a rough drum track, before Freeman adds lyrics and demoes the track from his home. Freeman has described his creative process as unscheduled and largely spontaneous: "Whenever something hits me I have to write it down [...] There’s a vibe that comes with that which you only get at night when you’re alone with your thoughts. It’s not always the best thing – when those darker thoughts come out, things can feel pretty bad – but it adds a realism to our music." Afterwards, the band engages "a lot of back and forth with ideas" before arriving at the finished result.

== Band members ==
- Harvey Freeman – vocals
- Pete Woolven – guitars
- Matas Michaliovskis – guitars
- Charlie Smith – bass
- Jack Bowdery – drums

== Awards and nominations ==
Heavy Music Awards
Year	Nominee / work	Award	Result	Ref.
2024	A Mind Waiting to Die	Best Breakthrough Album	Won	
2024	Themselves	Best UK Breakthrough Live Artist	Nominated	

== Discography ==
Studio albums

List of studio albums, with selected details
Title	Album details
A Mind Waiting to Die	Released: 17 February 2023; Label: Rude; Format: CD, CS, LP, DD
Who Are You When No One Is Watching?	Released: 12 July 2024; Label: Rude; Format: CD, CS, LP, DD

Compilation albums

List of compilation albums, with selected details
Title	Album details
Vol. 404	Released: 29 September 2023; Label: Rude; Format: LP

EPs

List of EPs, with selected details
Title	EP details
Vol. 1	Released: 25 April 2020; Label: Self-released; Format: CS, DD
New Skin	Released: 25 February 2022; Label: Rude; Format: DD

Singles

List of singles
Title	Year	Album
"Grit"	2019	Vol. 1
"Mortal Fear"	2019	Vol. 1
"De[in]fect"	2020	Vol. 1
"Leech"	2020	Vol. 1
"Chokehold"	2021	New Skin
"Drain"	2021	New Skin
"New Skin"	2022	New Skin
"Into the Dark" / "Bad Blood"	2022	A Mind Waiting to Die
"White Noise"	2022	A Mind Waiting to Die
"Killing Floor"	2022	A Mind Waiting to Die
"Headstone"	2023	A Mind Waiting to Die
"Fractured"	2023	Who Are You When No One Is Watching?
"To the Grave"	2024	Who Are You When No One Is Watching?
"Something I'm Not"	2024	Who Are You When No One Is Watching?
"Human"	2024	Who Are You When No One Is Watching?
"Faceless"	2026	Non-album single
