= Lastelle =

English band

- Origin: Oxford, Oxfordshire, U.K.
- Genres: Dreamcore; post-hardcore; post-rock
- Years active: 2018–present
- Labels: Year of the Rat; Beth Shalom; You Rang?
- Spinoff of: Vera Grace; Red Crow
- Members: Adam Rigozzi; Rich Lester; Jonjo Williams; Freddie Whatmore; Mike Hayden

Lastelle is an English post-hardcore band from Oxford. Formed in 2018 by former Vera Grace members Jonjo Williams (guitar), Rich Lester (guitar) and Mike Hayden (drums, vocals), as well as Freddie Whatmore (bass, vocals, brass) and Adam Rigozzi (vocals), the band released their debut EP Harrow in 2019. Their second EP Delicate came out in 2021, followed by Exist Vol. I (2024) and Exist Vol. II (2025). Their progressive fusion of post-hardcore, melodic hardcore and post-rock put them at the forefront of the mid-2020s wave of British post-hardcore and initiated a resurgence in dreamcore.

== History ==
Jonjo Williams (guitar), Rich Lester (guitar) and Mike Hayden (drums, vocals) played together as a part of Oxfordshire band Vera Grace. Following Vera Grace's 2017 disbandment, the members approached Adam Rigozzi, who had worked as the band's photographer and videographer, to be their new band's vocalist. Freddie Whatmore, who previously played in Red Crow, was a friend of the band who heard the band's early material and asked to be join, becoming their bassist. Lastelle officially formed in 2018, They chose their name in reference to the character Princess Lastelle of Pejite from the anime film Nausicaä of the Valley of the Wind (1984).

They released their debut EP Harrow on 15 February 2019. They spent much of the late 2010s on various tours supporting Dream State, Parting Gift, Polar, Press to Meco and Chapter and Verse, and occasionally played dates in Germany. On 29 September 2020, they released the single "Distant Bodies" through Dreambound. On 11 December 2020, they released the single "Only Apathy". That year, they signed to Year of the Rat Records. On 20 January 2021, they released the single "Departure". They released their second EP Delicate on 26 February 2021 through Beth Shalom and Year Of The Rat. Between 27 July and 1 August, they headlined a tour of the United Kingdom supporting the EP. Between 13 and 17 October, they toured the UK supporting Graphic Nature and A Night Like This.

On 12 December 2024, they released their third EP Exist Vol. I, and played a sold out release show at the Black Heart in Camden Town. Between 17 and 26 September, they headlined a tour of the United Kingdom. On 24 April 2025, they released the single "Tired Eyes", announcing it would be a part of the EP Exist Vol. II, intended for release on 12 September. On 8 June, they released the single "Bitter Seeds". In June 2025 the band played the Dogtooth stage at Download Festival. Between 16 and 21 January 2026, they co-headlined a tour of Europe with Seven Blood. Between 21 March and 16 April, they toured Europe supporting Casey. Between 1 and 6 May, they headlined a tour of south-east and east Asia. In July 2026 the band played 2000 Trees festival and headlined Reading Rising festival in November 2026, a festival they played their second show at when they opened the first event back in 2018.

== Artistry ==
Critics have categorised Lastelle's music as post-hardcore, post-rock and dreamcore. They incorporate elements of melodic hardcore, progressive music and doom metal. They identify as a "post-hardcore band, inspired by post-rock". They helped to establish a new wave of post-hardcore in mid-2020s, and led a revival wave of the dreamcore genre.

Their music is based around dynamics and cynamatic post-rock soundscapes and textures. They make use of wall of sound production, post-rock atmospheric elements soaring vocals and guitars breakdowns and experimental elements. Some songs incorporate brass. Critics have noted their style as being chaotic and emotional. They make use of multiple vocalists who have contrasting sung and screamed vocal style. Lyrics often focus on mental health, emotions, death, heartbreak and illness, and are written in an intimate style.

They have cited influences including the Elijah, Touché Amoré, Being as an Ocean, Caspian, Mono, Lower Than Atlantis, Sigur Rós, Casey, Holding Absence, Devil Sold His Soul, Rinoa, La Dispute, Defeater, Ef, Underoath, Alexisonfire, Silent Planet, the Antlers, Trade Wind, Manchester Orchestra, Coldplay and Paramore.

The band's music videos are generally directed by Lester. He has cited Zak Pinchin of Modern Error as an influence upon his directing style.

== Members ==
- Adam Rigozzi – vocals
- Rich Lester – guitar
- Jonjo Williams – guitar
- Freddie Whatmore – bass, vocals, brass
- Mike Hayden – drums, vocals

== Discography ==
EPs

- Harrow (2019)
- Delicate (2021)
- Exist Vol. I (2024)
- Exist Vol. II (2025)
