= Parting Gift (band) =

British rock band

- Origin: Manchester, Greater Manchester, U.K.
- Genres: Post-hardcore; dreamcore; post-rock; shoegaze; emo
- Years active: 2017–2019
- Label: Fearless
- Spinoff of: Holding Absence
- Past members: Zac Vernon; Petr Vybiral; Jack Dutton; George Barnes; Nick Barlow; Elliot Wallett

Parting Gift was a British rock band from Manchester. Formed in 2017 by former Holding Absence vocalist Zac Vernon and former Skywalker guitarist Petr Vybiral, for much of the band's career they also included George Barnes (drums), Jack Dutton (guitar) and Nick Barlow (bass). They initiated a series of singles with "Be Still" in February 2017, followed by their sole EP Ensome (2019), through Fearless Records. Parting Gift's sound built upon the dreamcore genre that surrounded Dreambound promotions in the 2010s, pioneering a new strain by emphasising its influence from post-rock and shoegaze. In 2019, they announced they were writing their debut full-length, however by the end of the year they had ceased activity. In 2021, the band posthumously revealed they had disbanded.

== History ==
Vocalist Zac Vernon founded Cardiff band Holding Absence in 2015, having previously been in a pop-punk band. He departed during summer 2016. Petr Vybiral, formerly of Manchester band Skywalker, reached out to Vernon online and sent him instrumentals he had written. Together, they formed Parting Gift. The pair remained the two consistent members of the band, undergoing many lineup changes. Eventually, Parting Gift settled into the lineup of Vernon and Vybiral, alongside George Barnes (drums), Jack Dutton (guitar), Nick Barlow (bass). Although the band considered themselves to have officially formed in Manchester, only Vybiral had lived in the city, with Vernon being from Cardiff but living in Leeds, Dutton living in the Midlands and Vybiral, for much of the band's career, living in the Czech Republic.

On 26 February 2017, they released their first single "Be Still". In March 2018, they were openers for the Leeds and Bridgend dates of Holding Absence and Loathe's co-headline tour. On 19 March, they released the double single "Vein" and "Rensing". Between 15 and 30 April 2018, they toured the UK supporting Cove. On 31 October 2018, they opened for Neck Deep at their Halloween, sold-out, headline show in Manchester alongside Lotus Eater and Strains.

On 15 February 2019, they released the single "Pale". This coincided with the announcement that they had signed to Fearless Records, who would release their debut EP Ensom on 22 March. The album's drumming was performed by Cameron Humphrey of Love is Noise and Lotus Eater. On 11 March, they released the single "Without Sin". The EP's release coincided with a music video for the song "3:07 (Moonlight)". Between 28 March and 25 April, they toured the United Kingdom supporting Dream State. On the tour, they were joined by touring bassist Elliot Wallett, who became an official member of the band during the second week. On 5 June, they opened for Underoath at the Electric Ballroom in London. They played the Saturday of Download Festival 2019. In an interview with The Sound Lab at the festival, they announced they were beginning to write their debut full-length.

Parting Gift ceased activity by the end of 2019. On 25 January 2021, they officially announced their disbandment through their social media accounts, calling it "very long-overdue" and clarifying that the band was active between 2017 and 2019. Vybiral and Wallett went on to play in Angel Number. Vybiral featured on the song "Keep Fighting the Good Fight" from Loathe's ambient album The Things They Believe (2021).

== Musical style ==
Critics categorised Parting Gift's music as post-hardcore, post-rock, shoegaze, emo, melodic hardcore and alternative rock. They incorporated elements of black metal, indie rock and electronic music. They subverted most of the hardcore punk elements of post-hardcore, instead emphasising ambient atmospheres. In a 2018 interview with Already Heard, Vernon stated of their influences, "As far as post-hardcore goes, I think we fall under that genre entirely by accident... Our biggest influences and what we stand for will definitely become clearer as we move forward".

Their music was depressive, making use of layered atmospherics, contrasted by a rhythm section, riffs and vocals more typical of post-hardcore and emotional vocals and instrumentation. Their songs were often based around dynamics putting an emphasis on loud choruses. Vernon's singing voice was high pitched, and emotional, often using minor key melodies and hooks. Many of their melodies were soaring. Already Heard called Vernon's voice "fragile". On their early singles, the often made use of screamed vocals and heavy guitar riffing, elements they abandonded on Ensom.

Parting Gift's lyrics often focus on mourning. Ensom was a concept EP about a being which Vernon described as "a cold, dark entity making one unable to feel anything" that infected dreams. It was inspired by the Germanic and Slavic folklore entity the Mare and sleep paralysis.

They cited influences including Hammock, the Cure, From First to Last, Jonny Craig, Linkin Park, David Bowie, Underoath, American Football, Led Zeppelin, Pink Floyd, the Japanese House, Johnny Marr, black metal and 1990s shoegaze.

The band made use of a black and white aesthetic. Their imagery was particularly influence by black metal. In an interview with Atom Splitter, Zernon stated this was due to his own interest in the genre when growing up, and its mystery, but noted that he wished to simply it for Parting Gift.

=== Legacy ===
A 2017 article by Punktastic stated that "Parting Gift are ready to explode". The Soundboard credited them as helping to make a "genuine force" of "bleak, atmospheric post-hardcore". In 2019, Rocked noted that their combination of post-hardcore and shoegaze "sounds different from everything in the typical format of song writing" and helping to define "a new sound" and "totally unique experience". Circuit Sweet writer too called them "one of the UK’s most exciting and unique up and coming rock talents". This sound pioneered the post-rock-leaning sect of the dreamcore genre, a style that would go on to be adopted by Exit Dream, Lastelle, Lonesome and Love is Noise.

== Members ==
- Zac Vernon — vocals (2017–2019)
- Petr Vybiral — guitars (2017–2019)
- Jack Dutton — guitars (2017–2019)
- George Barnes — drums (2017–2019)
- Nick Barlow – bass (2017–2019)
- Elliot Wallett – bass (2019)

== Discography ==
EPs

- Ensom (2019)

Singles

- "Be Still" (2017)
- "In Mind" (2017)
- "Asleep" (2017)
- "Vein" and "Rensing" (2017)
- "Pale" (2019)
- "Without Sin" (2019)
