= Loathe (band) =

English metalcore band

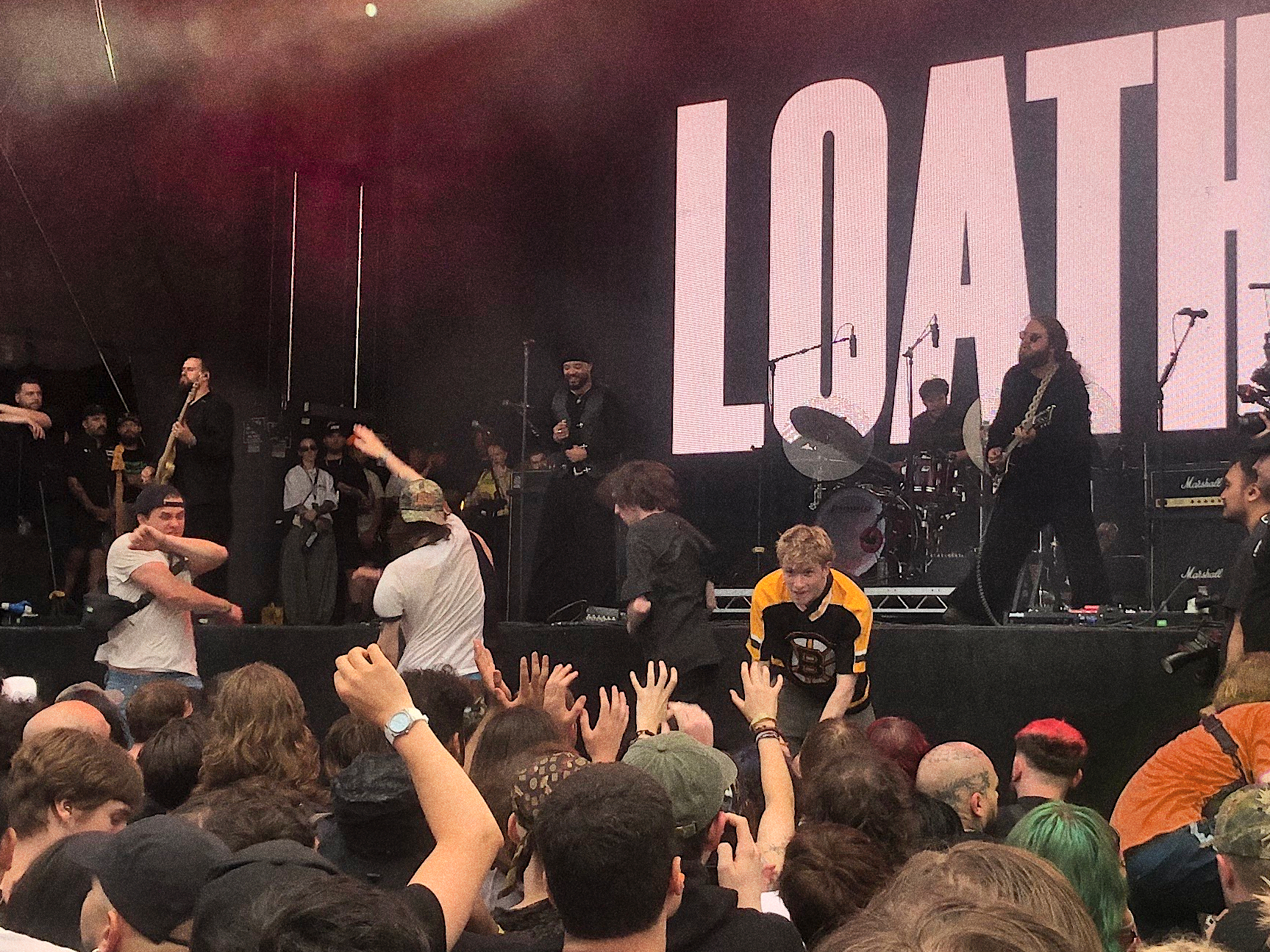
- Loathe performing live at Outbreak Festival 2026

Background information
- Also known as: Our Imbalance (2011–2015)
- Origin: Liverpool, Merseyside, England
- Genres: Metalcore; nu metal; post-metal; alternative metal; progressive metal
- Years active: 2011–present
- Labels: SharpTone; Nuclear Blast; Relativity
- Spinoffs: God Complex
- Members: Erik Bickerstaffe; Kadeem France; Sean Radcliffe; Feisal El-Khazragi
- Past members: Harry Rule; Adam Rogers; Chris Briers; Shayne Smith; Connor Sweeney
- Website: loatheasone.co.uk

Loathe are an English heavy metal band from Liverpool. The band's music makes use of elements of metalcore and nu metal, while also incorporating more experimental aspects from genres like shoegaze, progressive metal and industrial music. Formed in 2011 under the name Our Imbalance, the group consists of lead vocalist Kadeem France, guitarist and second vocalist Erik Bickerstaffe, drummer Sean Radcliffe and bassist Feisal El-Khazragi.

Signed to SharpTone Records, they have released three EPs and four studio albums. Prepare Consume Proceed was released in 2015 and was re-issued in 2016 through SharpTone Records as the label's first release. They released their debut studio album, The Cold Sun, in 2017, followed by a split EP recorded with label-mates Holding Absence titled This Is as One in 2018. Loathe released their second studio album I Let It In and It Took Everything on 7 February 2020. Their third studio album the Things They Believe was released on 7 February 2021 as an extension of their previous album, and was made up entirely of ambient tracks. They released their fourth album A Stranger to You on 17 July 2026.

Loathe have been nominated for Heavy Music Awards best UK breakthrough band and Metal Hammer Golden Gods Awards best new band in 2018. In a 2020 poll by Revolver magazine, they were voted the third most likely contemporary band to break through into the mainstream.

== History ==
=== Formation and Prepare Consume Proceed EP (2011–2016) ===
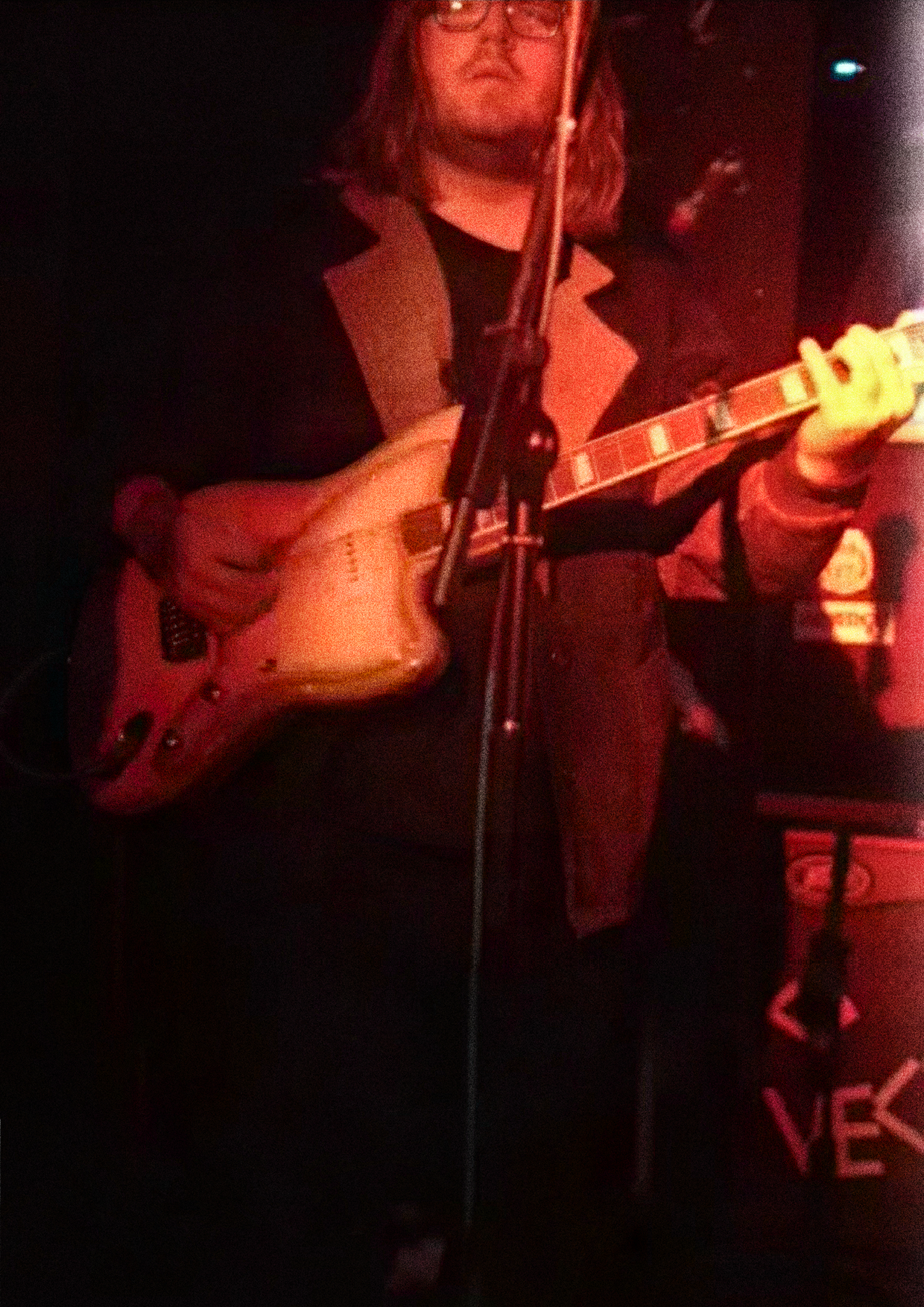
Erik Bickerstaffe formed Our Imbalance in 2011 and was its sole founding member by the time of its name change to Loathe

Under the name Our Imbalance, the band was founded by Erik Bickerstaffe (guitar, vocals), alongside Harry Rule (vocals), Adam Rogers (drums) and Chris "Mr Boom" Briers (bass). Eventually, Rule left the band due to age differences and the other members being straight edge, while he was not. He later formed God Complex. Kadeem France was hired as his replacement in 2012, having recently left his role as drummer in Escapists. That year, Rogers also departed from the group, replaced by Sean Radcliffe. They then released their debut self-titled EP. By the end of the year, the band also included guitarist Connor Sweeney and bassist Shayne Smith. Bickerstaffe has mentioned that Our Imbalance's influences consisted of Miss May I and Attack Attack!, which he grouped as synthcore.

In 2015, Our Imbalance began writing music for a second EP, now incorporating influences from outside of metalcore, particularly Deftones and Meshuggah. In a 2020 interview with Metal Hammer, France stated the new music didn't "fit the vibe" of Our Imbalance. Subsequently, the members became disheartened by their name and image, deciding to rebrand. They took the name Loathe from Radcliffe's solo thrash metal project of the same name. The first of this new material was released on 1 May 2015, as the single "In Death". It was accompanied by a music video, followed by a second single and video for "Rest; In Violence" on 13 July 2015. That year, they performed at Deadbolt Festival on 8 August, and in Autumn that same year they released their first EP titled Prepare Consume Proceed independently. The band initially kept their names anonymous, using stage names (DRK, DRT, SNK, MWL and NIL) along with not revealing their origin. Kadeem France was the only one whose stage name was revealed (DRK) as he is the lead vocalist, and was identified by a prophetic mask of unknown significance, which was used as the album artwork for their EP. On 22 November, the band supported metal band Empires Fade during their show in Manchester.

Moving onto June 2016, the band would tour as support act for Oceans Ate Alaska during their UK tour. On 8 July the same year, their EP was re-issued through SharpTone Records as the label's first release since its conception a month prior. They would re-release the video for "In Death" at the same time, and remove the video for "Rest; In Violence" indefinitely. Bickerstaffe explained that the band was discovered by the label shortly after their independent release of their first music video for Sheol/In Death, and after their initial dialogue and exchanging of ideas, the band and label managers "clicked" and they partnered up. The EP received positive reviews, Kerrang! magazine praised the album's heavy djent style and "synthy atmosphere" but criticised the band's horror-like image, stage names and France's mask as "some bargain-bin horror flick", giving the album 3 K's out of 5.

As the band's career progressed, the members decided that the use of code-names and the mask was unnecessary, citing that they just wanted to be themselves when performing their music and pointed to the likes of Ghost and Slipknot and their influences for starting that gimmick in the first place. Bickerstaffe would later admit that their use of masks and code-names was "...shamelessly taking ideas from other bands.", ditching them as a means of distinguishing themselves. Also in early July the band performed at Tech-Fest, later on the same month they toured as the support act for metal band Carcer City around the UK, and on 25 September, the band performed at Ozzfest meets Knotfest California on the Nuclear Blast stage.

=== The Cold Sun and This Is as One split EP (2017–2018) ===
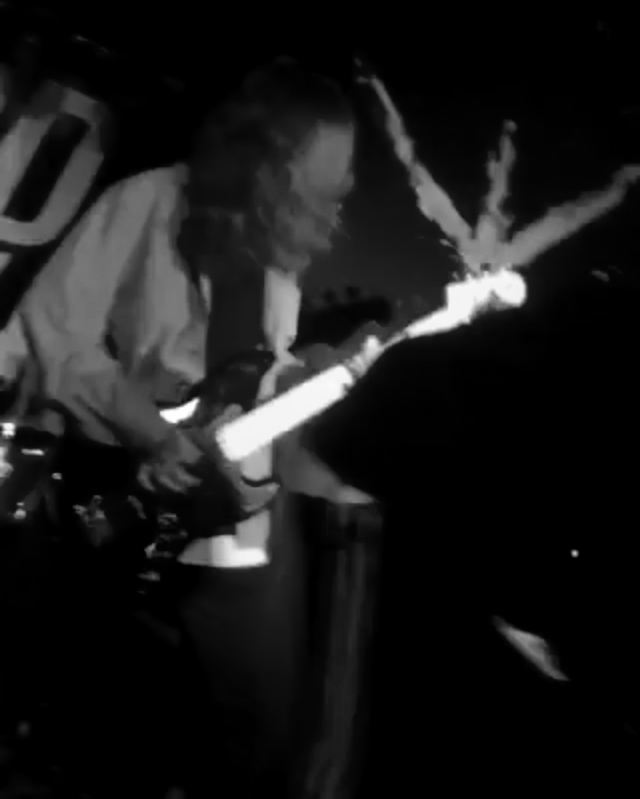
Former member Shayne Smith performing live at The Key Club in 2017

Initially, the band was planned to start off 2017 as a support act for Emmure during their UK tour in January, however due to unforeseen delays in Emmure's album production, the tour was cancelled. In April the band toured as a support act for Blood Youth and in May the band also performed at the London warm-up show for Hellfest. A few months later, they released their debut studio album, titled The Cold Sun on 2 June 2017. The album was produced by Matt McClellan and was recorded in the Dark Studios in Atlanta, Georgia. From 23 August to 5 September the band headlined a tour in the UK with metal band Harbinger, following up with three more dates from 6 to 8 with metal band Lotus Eater, and later throughout October and November, the band was the support act for Bury Tomorrow during their "Stage Invasion" tour in the UK. One of their last shows of the year was performed at Binfest 2017 in late November.

Starting off 2018, the band released a split EP with SharpTone Records label mate Holding Absence on 8 February, and was followed up with a co-headline tour in March with support act Modern Error, along with God Complex at a show in Leeds. The band were nominated for their first award at the Metal Hammer Golden Gods Awards for best new band of 2018, and in April they were also nominated for Heavy Music Awards best UK breakthrough band, the latter of which the band performed at the award's announcements ceremony in Manchester. The band performed at the Slam Dunk and Teddy Rocks festivals in May, and in June the band's bassist Shayne Smith announced that after performing at Download Festival, he would be leaving the band to pursue a career as a tattoo artist, with his role being filled by ex-Holding Absence guitarist Feisal El-Khazragi. In early July, the band performed at the 2018 Tech-Fest, and later that same month, the band performed at the 2000 trees festival. In September, they were the supporting band for Sikth during their "Riddles of Humanity" UK tour, along with also supporting Of Mice & Men on their mini-tour in the UK in November. In December, the band supported metal band Palm Reader in London.

When queried regarding new music, Bickerstaffe confirmed that the band had been writing new songs, stating that at some point they may recluse somewhere to focus solemnly on making music, though at the time he admitted that he wasn't sure if the next album would be an EP or a full studio release, with an initial prediction of it being released in 2019. In October 2018, Bickerstaffe commented that the band had planned 12 new songs for the album, meanwhile he was also busy producing music for other metals acts, one such release being the EP "Created Sick" by Merseyside band God Complex whom they toured with earlier the same year, while vocalist Kadeem France collaborated with metal band Of Legions on their single "Vision of Misery".

=== I Let It In and It Took Everything and the Things They Believe (2019–2024) ===
In late April and early May, Loathe supported Hollywood Undead on the stretch of their UK tour, performed at Two Thousand Trees Festival in July, and performed at both Radar Festival and the Heavy Metal Music Awards in August. Loathe released an EP titled "Gored/New Face in the Dark" featuring the two new singles on 20 September 2019, along with a music video for "Gored" with one for "New Faces in the Dark" being released on 10 October, and toured through Japan and China throughout the month alongside label mates Crystal Lake. On 29 November, the band released a new song titled Aggressive Evolution, along with the announcement of their new album titled I Let It In and It Took Everything and was set to release on 7 February 2020. In December, the band toured as a support act for Stray from the Path during their European tour, along with the Devil Wears Prada and Gideon.

On 10 January 2020, the band released Two-Way Mirror, accompanied with a music video. The band released the song "Screaming" a day prior to the release of their second album on 6 February in anticipation of its release, which coincided with their UK Headlining tour, where they were supported by bands The Well Runs Red, Phoxjaw, and God Complex. Upon the album's release, Bickerstaffe expressed that the new family of tracks "...offers a brand new perspective and identity for Loathe." while still retaining some familiar aspects of their previous music. In June, the band participated in the virtual Download Festival. On 26 December 2020, the band released the instrumental edition of I Let It In and It Took Everything.

On 22 January 2021, the band announced that they would release their new album called The Things They Believe on 7 February 2021, exactly one year to the date since the release of I Let It In and It Took Everything, and named after the script of the 2007 vampire thriller 30 Days of Night. It is the band's first instrumental album, and is intended to expand on, and run parallel with, their previous album by creating sonic soundscapes and atmospheres as a means to expand on the Loathe lore, as well as providing solace during lockdown as consequence of the COVID-19 pandemic. The album also features collaborations with the 1975's saxophonist John Waugh, Parting Gift guitarist Peter Vybiral, and Static Dress guitarist Vincent Weight. On 1 September, Loathe announced that they would be playing the entirety of their album "I Let It in and It Took Everything" as part of an 8-date headline UK tour. It started on 9 December in Glasgow and finished on 18 December in London. It also included a show in their hometown Liverpool on 10 December. On 18 September, the band announced the departure of guitarist Connor Sweeney, while thanking him for his contributions, the guitarist clarified that part of the reason for leaving was because he "thought some things might have changed with time within the band but unfortunately in this case things continued to stay the same" so to preserve his sanity and mental health he chose to leave, and added that he would be back with new music and playing shows once "all is ready".

On 6 January 2022, the band released a new song titled "Dimorphous Display", which was followed by a rerecording of their song, "Is It Really You" featuring Sleep Token. On 17 August Loathe announced that they had cancelled their upcoming tour in order to focus their efforts on writing and recording their upcoming fourth studio album. On 20 October 2023, the band were featured on a reworking of Static Dress's song "Lye Solution" alongside BVDLVD and Hail the Sun from their EP Rouge Carpet Disaster (Redux) Volume 2.

=== A Stranger to You (2024–present) ===
In December 2024, it was announced that Loathe would support Spiritbox on their Tsunami Sea North American Tour, along with Dying Wish and Gel. On an episode of the 78 Amped podcast, uploaded on the 14 December 2024, France and Bickerstaffe confirmed that the band's fourth studio album had been recorded and was planned for a release in 2025. At the first show of the tour in Dallas, Loathe opened their set with a new song, included in the setlist as "???". The song was later released as a single under the title "Gifted Every Strength" on the 2 May 2025 with a press release stating the single "ushers in a new era of Loathe".

On the same tour with Spiritbox, they played another new song, which was later revealed to be titled "Revenant". On 22 July, Loathe announced a 25 date USA headline tour, and then on 26 August, they announced a European/UK tour. On 27 April 2026, Loathe formally released "Revenant" as a single, now featuring Jami Morgan and Eric Balderose of NOWHERE2RUN (formerly of Code Orange) and announced their fourth studio album, A Stranger to You, would be released 17 July 2026, through SharpTone Records. It will be the band's first album in six years, and will include "Gifted Every Strength", "Revenant", and another track "ثينا" that was also played on previous tours. Between 9 and 16 May 2026, they toured Australia, with support from Static Dress. On 24 June, the album's third single "Fangs" was released, containing elements of contemporary R&B and psychedelic music.

== Artistry ==
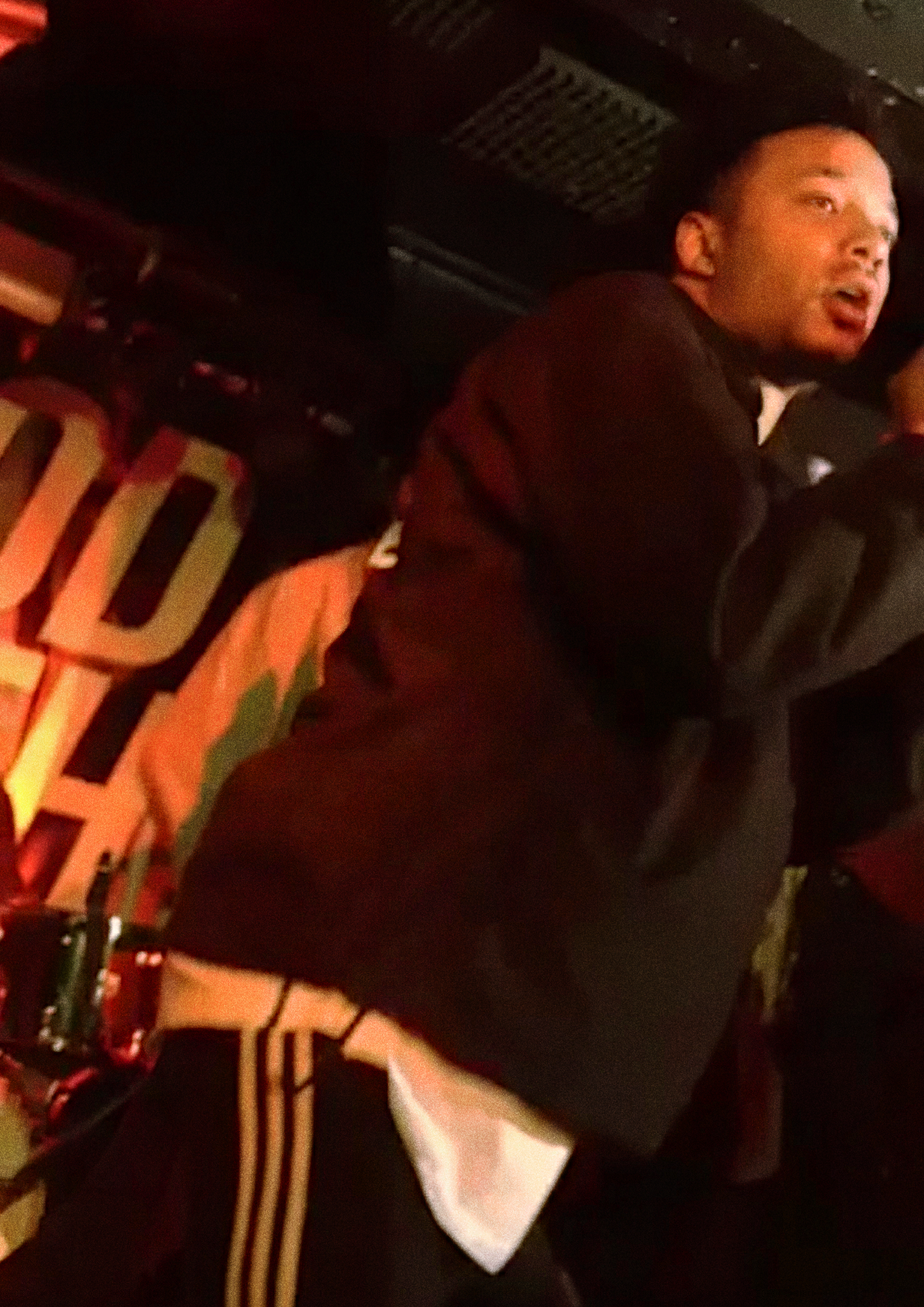
Vocalist Kadeem France performing live in 2017

=== Musical style ===
Critics have categorised Loathe's music as metalcore, nu metal, nu metalcore, alternative metal, shoegaze, progressive metalcore, post-hardcore, post-metal, and progressive metal. In an interview with PopMatters, France categorised the band as a "nu-metal-y metalcore band", likening their sound to that of Code Orange and Vein.fm. This sentiment was echoed in an article by Distorted Sound Magazine, where the band were referred to as being part of the latest metalcore movement within the genre, along the likes of Code Orange and Ocean Grove. They have also been grouped by publications like NME and Hysteria magazine with similar bands such as Lotus Eater, Modern Error, Holding Absence and God Complex, noted as a new wave of bands within the genre.

The band often uses the dynamic of clean and unclean vocals. While Bickerstaffe used to be the sole clean vocalist, France has increasingly done more clean vocals on recent songs. Metal Injection, upon reviewing the band's debut studio album The Cold Sun, also went on to call it borderline deathcore along with the band's experimental and progressive take on metalcore, but the likes of DistortedSoundMag.com, TheMonoloth.com and Kerrang! have all also used deathcore/death metal as a way to describe their music. The band have been praised by publications such as Metal Hammer and Metal Injection, for their use of electronics in their music, often delivered purely for atmosphere rather than the forefront of the band's music, and is often accredited as the band's experimental features, often going into industrial territory.

Expanding on the band's metalcore sound further, others have also pointed out the band's incorporation of elements from other genres, one frequent point made is the band's use of djent elements in their music, typically regarding their guitar styles. In an article for Revolver magazine, they were described as making music ranging between "industrialized metallic hardcore that's as crushing as it comes, to shoegaze-inflected post-rock that soars and shimmers". Other elements the band has been found to incorporate in their style are nu metal, shoegaze, and progressive metal. The band has been recommended for listeners of such bands like Attila, Slipknot, Fit for an Autopsy, the Devil Wears Prada, Between the Buried and Me and Code Orange.

The 2021 instrumental album the Things They Believe also showcases the band's ability to create atmospheric sounds and sonic soundscapes with their use of expressionist, experimental, and synth heavy sounds, which has been compared to the works of Trent Reznor & Atticus Ross, Vangelis, and soundtracks to David Lynch films, described as noir-like electronic-ambience.

=== Lyrical style ===
The band describes themselves as a conceptual band, as throughout all of their album releases they have been telling stories of fiction. Their first release, Prepare Consume Proceed, was said to involve a story about a tormented protagonist, who loses a loved one and is later killed by the end of the EP's run. The studio album the Cold Sun tells a narrative of a violent post-apocalyptic setting, mixing themes of desolation with an overarching sense of positivity and heroism. The record supposedly tells a story of two protagonists who exist during this dystopian setting set up by in the album. Bickerstaffe has stated that they do not take influence from other major concept records and acts such as Thirty Seconds to Mars and Pink Floyd, making the remark: "Our inspiration to create concept records mostly comes from wanting to create our own worlds within the music, almost like looking at the album as a book with separate chapters."

For the second album, Bickerstaffe has stated that their writing process starts with the concept, which is spread out across 12 songs. Once they have a plan for what they want to create, they focus on sustaining those songs.

=== Live performances ===
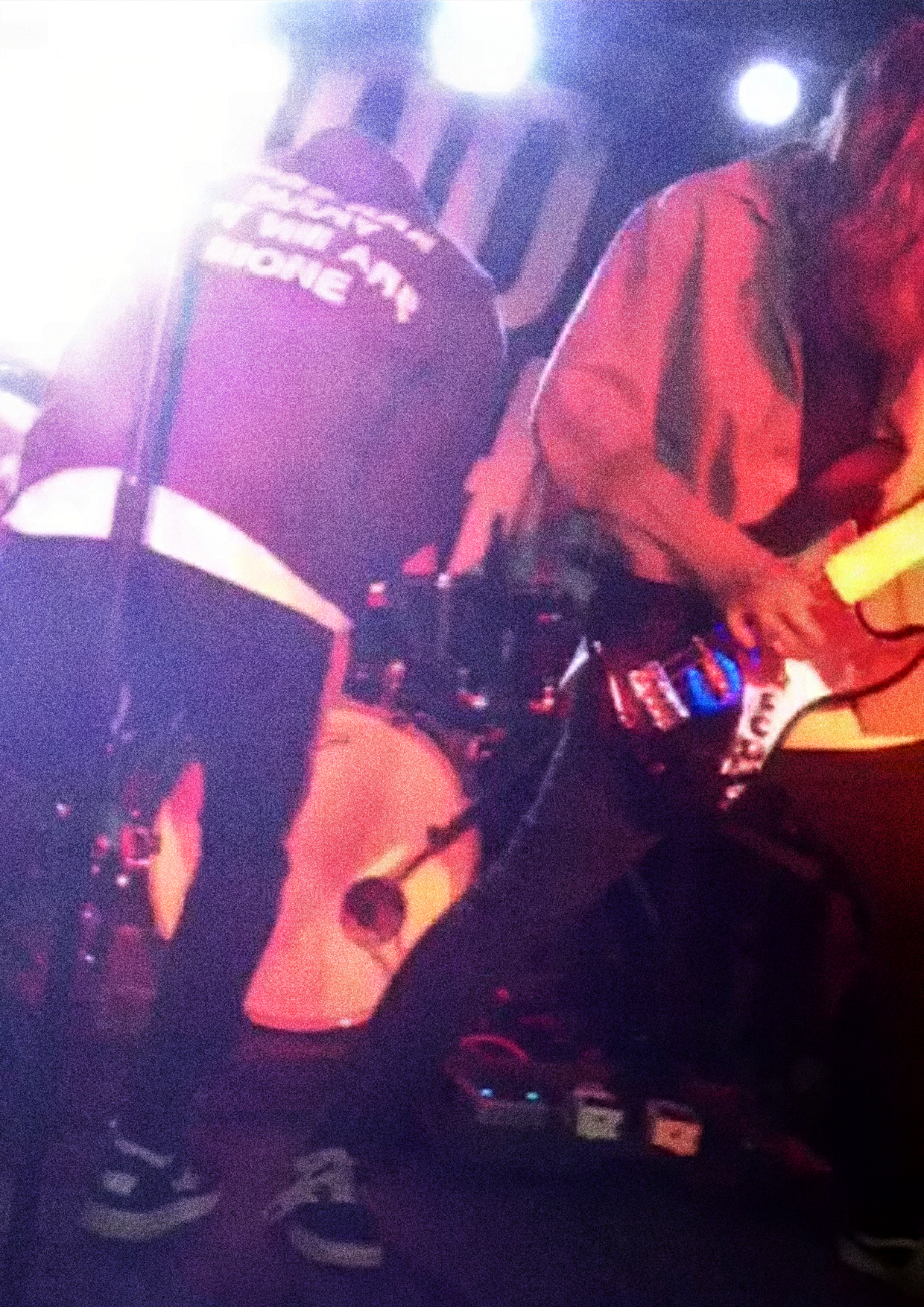
Kadeem France (left) and Shayne Smith (right) performing live in 2017

Metal Hammer and WhatCulture writer Matt Mills named the band 2018's greatest live metal act, stating that their presence on stage is "always intense and cinematic" whilst applauding the band's use of atmospheric, minimalist interludes inspired by film soundtracks. The band's lead vocalist Kadeem France utilised a prophetic mask of unknown significance, which was used as the album artwork for their EP. Bickerstaffe mentioned to Kerrang! that they "...take a lot of inspiration from Marvel, DC and the rest of the comic world - seeing our live shows like performance art." adding that "The mask is definitely a big part of that what we do, but it's not entirely everything." Since 2016 however, the band has not used the mask, citing the gimmick to be influenced by major acts such as Ghost and Slipknot, wearing it to pay homage to such bands. During the same year, Kerrang! writer Sam Law criticised the band's use of masks and then stage names in 2016, calling it "shittily clichéd". The use of TV screens on the stage is also utilised for the band's gritty, theatrical presence.

=== Influences ===
On their earliest releases, Slipknot was Loathe's biggest influence, particularly in terms of the band's use of dark atmospheric, industrial elements and vocal aggression. In a March 2020 interview with Metal Hammer, France and Bickerstaffe cited the band's biggest influences as Koloss by Meshuggah, the soundtrack for Sinister by Christopher Young, Doin' It Again by Skepta, Diamond Eyes by Deftones and Attack Attack! by Attack Attack. In a 2026 interview, Bickerstaffe noted Code Orange's album Forever (2017) as "extremely influential", as well as expressing a current love for Allan Holdsworth and influence of Joey Sturgis productions, the Haarp Machine and Within the Ruins upon the band's early material.

In a 2017 interview, Bickerstaffe stated that the band aspires to be on the same level as Deftones, Slipknot and Korn, going on to say that he and the other members are not inspired by the sound of "modern bands today", preferring the sounds from those they do take influence from. In an interview with Distorted Sound magazine, France and Bickerstaffe also cited Glassjaw as an influence, as well as going onto elaborate that Deftones influenced their use of clean vocals and heavy guitars, and Radiohead influenced their drive to experiment musically. In a 2023 interview Kerrang, France cited Earl Sweatshirt, Tyler, the Creator, Michael Jackson, Skepta and Erykah Badu as influences.

The band are also influenced by the soundtracks for Silent Hill 2 composed by Akira Yamaoka, Akira composed by Geinoh Yamashirogumi and the Blade Runner soundtrack composed by Vangelis. These soundtracks influenced the band's debut album, the Cold Sun, regarding its story-telling and atmosphere, along with Akira being an influence on the album's artwork. They are also major influences on the band's creation of their 2021 ambient instrumental album the Things They Believe.

In 2018, France and Holding Absence vocalist Lucas Woodland said that their bands mutually "inspire each other". In 2026, France said the same about Loathe and Static Dress. A similar sentiment was shared by Harry Rule in an interview about his band God Complex, stating that since childhood, he and Bickerstaffe have musically "influenced each other... him influencing me bit more because he's ridiculous". France has also stated that seeing Sleep Token live often makes him reassess the music he makes, while Sleep Token vocalist Vessel has expressed his appreciation of Loathe by covering their songs on at least three occasions.

Other influences they have cited include Being as an Ocean, Carcer City, Chasing the Legion, Architects, Oceano, Thy Art is Murder, Chelsea Grin, Bring Me the Horizon, the Ailment, Silence, D'Angelo, Usher, Hammock, Tame Impala, Sylosis, Devin Townsend, Killswitch Engage, Flying Lotus, My Bloody Valentine, the Verve, the Fall of Troy, Ceruleus, Northlane, Prepared like a Bride, Queens of the Stone Age, Limp Bizkit, the 1975, Robert Glasper, A Tribe Called Quest and Puma Blue.

=== Legacy ===
Kerrang! writer Sam Law credited I Let It In and It Took Everything (2020) as "trailblazing a sound that would define heavy music for the early part of the decade", noting its influence upon works by Sleep Token, Thornhill, Bad Omens, Dayseeker and Deftones. The band's use of the Fender Bass VI as a guitar, which tunes to an octave below a standard tuning guitar, became widely sought after following the album's release.

Loathe have been cited as an influence by Alpha Wolf, Black Coast, Graphic Nature, Heriot, Invent Animate, Lotus Eater, Love is Noise, Lovejoy, Rolo Tomassi, Spiritbox and Underoath.

== Members ==
Current members

- Erik Bickerstaffe – guitar, lead vocals (2011–present), keyboards (2018–present)
- Kadeem France – lead vocals (2012–present), occasional guitar (2026-present)
- Sean Radcliffe – drums (2012–present)
- Feisal El-Khazragi – bass, keyboards, backing vocals (2018–present), guitar (2026-present)

Current touring musicians

- Cam Bartlett – percussion, bass, keyboards, backing vocals (2026–present)

Former members

- Harry Rule – vocals (2011–2012)
- Adam Rogers – drums (2011–2012)
- Chris Briers – bass (2011–2012)
- Shayne Smith – bass (2012–2018), backing vocals (2017–2018)
- Connor Sweeney – guitar (2012–2021), backing vocals (2017–2021)

Former touring musicians

- Louis Giannamore – drums (2023; substitute for Sean Radcliffe)
- Ryan Chan – bass, keyboards, backing vocals (2026; substitute for Feisal El-Khazragi)

Timeline

== Discography ==
Loathe discography
- Studio albums: 4
- EPs: 2
- Live albums: 1
- Singles: 12
- Music videos: 8

=== Studio albums ===
Title	Album details	Peak chart positions		
Title	Album details	UK	AUS	US
The Cold Sun	Released: 14 April 2017; Label: SharpTone, Relativity Entertainment; Format: CD, LP, cassette, music download, streaming	—	—	—
I Let It In and It Took Everything	Released: 7 February 2020; Label: SharpTone; Format: CD, download, streaming, LP	—	—	—
The Things They Believe	Released: 7 February 2021; Label: SharpTone; Format: download, streaming, LP	—	—	—
A Stranger to You	Released: 17 July 2026; Label: SharpTone; Format: CD, cassette, download, streaming, LP	68	28	158

=== EPs ===
Title	Album details
Our Imbalance (as Our Imbalance)	Released: 20 April 2012; Label: Self-released; Format: Music download, streaming
Prepare Consume Proceed	Released: 02 October 2015 (self-released), 8 July 2016 (re-issue); Label: SharpTone (re-issue), Nuclear Blast (re-issue); Format: CD, music download, streaming
This Is as One	Released: 16 February 2018; Label: SharpTone, Nuclear Blast; Format: LP, music download, streaming; Notes: Split EP with Holding Absence

=== Live albums ===
Title	Album details
Audiotree from Nothing	Released: 29 March 2023; Label: Audiotree; Format: Music download, streaming; Notes: Live performance

=== Singles ===
Title	Year	US Hard Rock	Album/EP
"In Death"	2016	—	Prepare Consume Proceed
"Dance on My Skin"	2017	—	The Cold Sun
"It's Yours"	2017		The Cold Sun
"White Hot"	2017	—	This Is as One
"Gored"	2019	—	I Let It In and It Took Everything
"New Faces in the Dark"	2019	—	I Let It In and It Took Everything
"Aggressive Evolution"	2019	—	I Let It In and It Took Everything
"Two-Way Mirror"	2019	—	I Let It In and It Took Everything
"Dimorphous Display"	2022	—	Non-album singles
"Is It Really You?" (with Teenage Wrist or Sleep Token)	2022	—	Non-album singles
"Gifted Every Strength"	2025	—	A Stranger to You
"Revenant" (with Nowhere2Run)	2026	—	A Stranger to You
"Fangs"	2026	—	A Stranger to You
"Fortress Down"	2026	23	A Stranger to You

=== Music videos ===
Title	Year	Director	Link
"Sheol/In Death"	2015	Chris Porter	
"Dance on My Skin"	2017	Chris Porter	
"It's Yours"	2017	Zak Pinchin	
"East of Eden"	2017	unknown	
"White Hot"	2017	Zak Pinchin	
"Gored"	2019	Zak Pinchin	
"New Faces in the Dark"	2019	Zak Pinchin	
"Two-Way Mirror"	2020	Zak Pinchin	
"Revenant"	2026	Zak Pinchin & Loathe	
"Fangs"	2026	Feisal El-Khazragi & Zak Pinchin	

=== As a featured artist ===
- Blanket - "In Awe" featuring Loathe (2021)
- Static Dress – "Lye Solution" featuring Loathe, BVDLVD and Hail the Sun (2023)
- Nowhere2Run – "Ant in the Afterbirth" featuring Loathe (2024)

== Awards and nominations ==
Metal Hammer Golden Gods Awards
Year	Nominee / work	Award	Result	Ref.
2018	Themselves	Best New Band	Nominated	

MOBO Awards
Year	Nominee / work	Award	Result	Ref.
2022	Themselves	Best Alternative Music Act	Nominated	

Heavy Music Awards
Year	Nominee / work	Award	Result	Ref.
2018	Themselves	Best UK Breakthrough Band	Nominated	
2021	Themselves	Best UK Band	Nominated	
2021	I Let It In and It Took Everything	Best Production	Nominated	
