= Outworld =

Outworld may refer to:

== Game ==
- Outworld, a fictional realm in the Mortal Kombat franchise
- Outworld, a 1981 VIC-20 video game

== Music ==
- Outworld (album), 2021 album by Black Coast
- Outworld, an American progressive metal band which guitarist Rusty Cooley was a part of.

== See also ==
- Outer World, video game
- Outer Worlds, virtual reality
- Outer planets of the Solar System
