= Modern Error =

English rock band

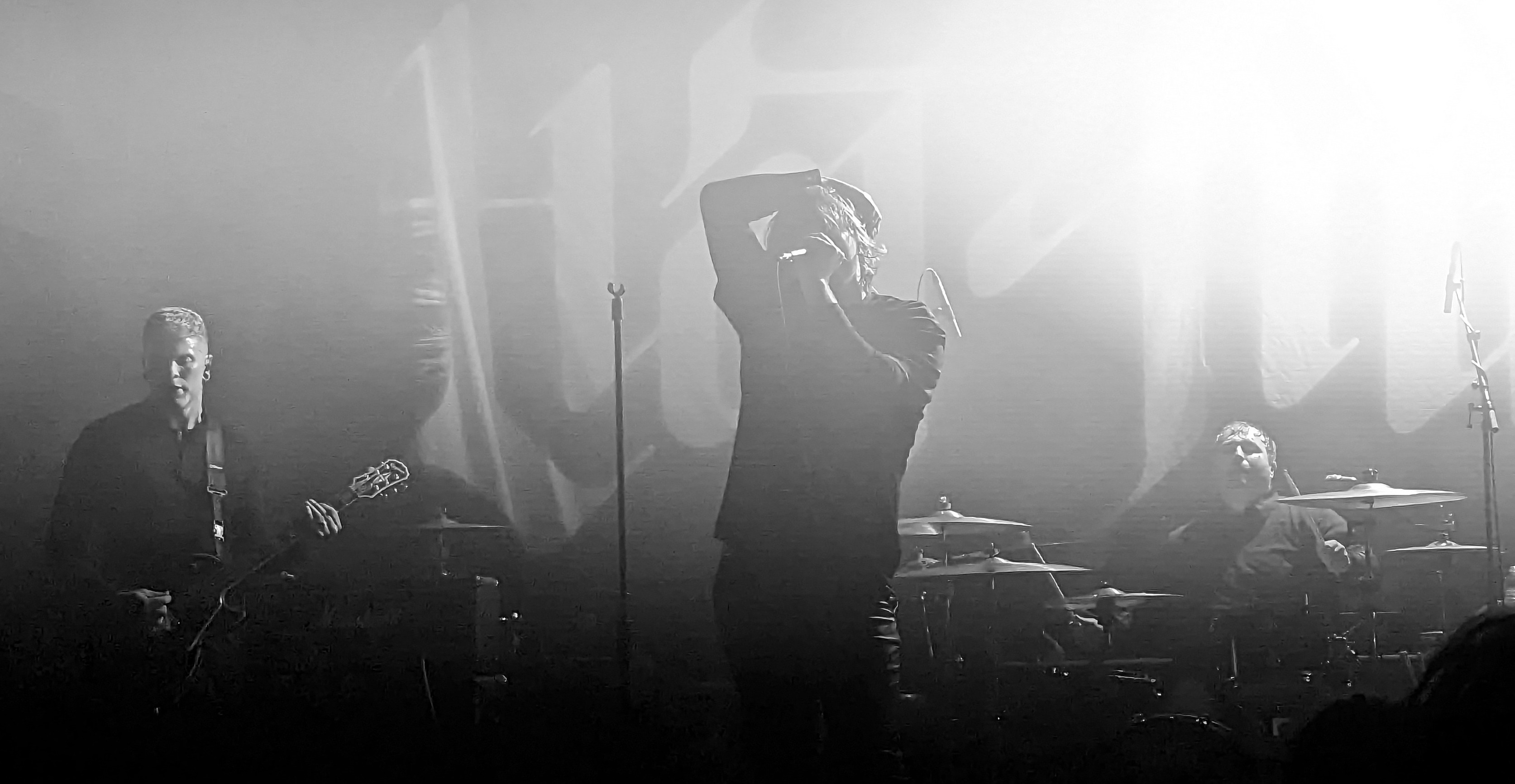
- Modern Error performing live in 2023

Background information
- Origin: Peterborough, Cambridgeshire, U.K.
- Genres: Post-hardcore; emo; metalcore; melodic hardcore; post-rock; electronic
- Years active: 2017–2023
- Label: Rude
- Past members: Zak Pinchin; Kel Pinchin

Modern Error was an English rock band formed in Peterborough. Formed in 2017, the band consisted of brothers Zak Pinchin (vocals) and Kel Pinchin (guitar). Following a series of singles they released, their debut EP, Lost in the Noise (2019), which was followed by their debut full-length album, Victim Of A Modern Age (2022). Their final release was the collaborative single "Death (By Modern Error)" with Bury Tomorrow, playing their final live show on 25 November 2023. Their fusion of various hardcore punk genres with post-rock and electronic music put them at the forefront of a wave of heavy, genre-fluid artists in the late 2010s, alongside Loathe and Holding Absence, and into the 2020s alongside Static Dress.

== History ==
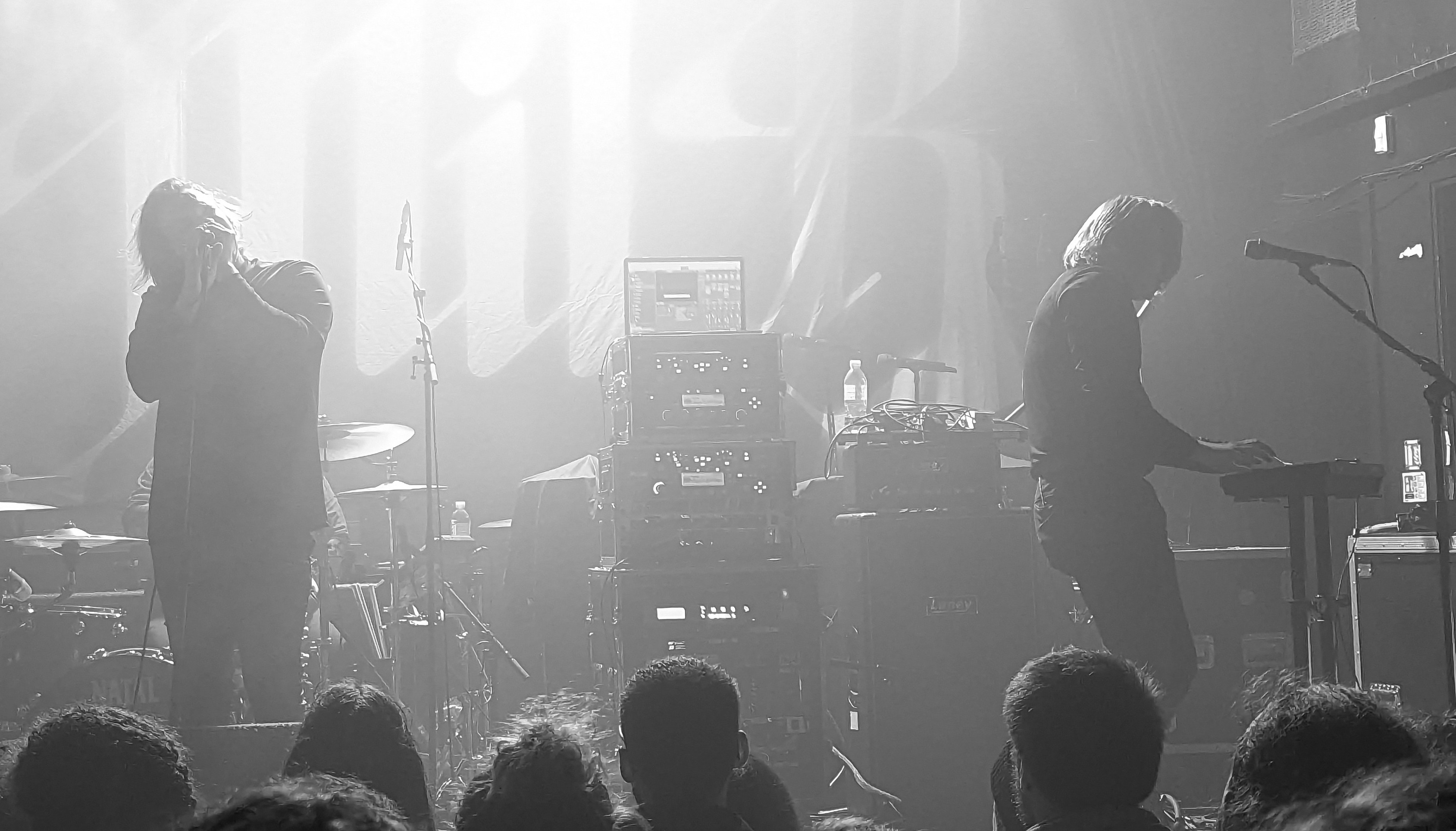
Modern Error played their final show on 25 November 2023

Modern Error formed in Peterborough in 2017. The founding members were brothers vocalist Zak Pinchin and guitarist Kel Pinchin, joined during live performances by guitarist Phil Moore, drummer Conor Nicholls and bassist Aurélien Mariat. At the time, Zak was a music video director who worked with groups including Mallory Knox and Holding Absence. They released their debut single "Buried and Blue" on 28 September 2017.

On 27 February 2018, they released the single "Blackout Poetry", premiered through Punktastic. The next day, they released the single "Self Synthetic" through Dreambound promotions, announcing it would be a part of their debut EP Lost In The Noise, to be released the following day. Between 3 and 10 March, they opened the United Kingdom co-headline tour of Holding Absence and Loathe. Between 27 August and 4 September, they toured the UK supporting Homebound. Between 1 and 9 June 2019, they co-headlined a tour of England, alongside Lotus Eater. They performed on the Friday of the 2019 2000 Trees Festival.

When the COVID-19 lockdowns began, the band began to write new material remotely. This put a strain on contact with Mariat, who soon departed from the band. They entered the studio to record their debut album in August 2020. Between 9 and 18 December 2021, they supported Loathe on their UK headline tour, alongside Slow Crush. On 26 July 2021, they released the single "Error Of The World", announcing they had signed to Rude Records. This was followed by the release of "A Vital Sign" on 6 September. On 18 October, they released the single "The Truest Blue", and announced the three singles would be a part of their debut album Victim of a Modern Age, set for release on 21 January 2022.

On 28 April 2022, they released the collaborative single "Death (By Modern Error)" with Bury Tomorrow. They performed at Download Festival 2022 on 12 June. In February 2023, they co-headlined two dates with Void of Vision, and support from Love is Noise. On 8 July, they performed at 2000 Trees Festival 2023. Between 18 and 25 November 2023, they supported Hot Milk and their UK headline tour, alongside Witch Fever.

== Artistry ==
=== Musical style ===
Critics categorised Modern Error's music as post-hardcore, melodic hardcore, post-rock, metalcore, emo, electronic music, post-punk and mathcore. They often incorporated elements of industrial music, hardcore punk, synthwave, industrial metal and metalcore. They built upon the pop screamo sound of Funeral for a Friend and Finch, experimenting with industrial and electronic elements. In an interview with Distorted Sound the band identified their early music as post-hardcore, but considered themselves to have progressed past that genre on their subsequent material stating, "I think we just wanted more. We needed more".

Modern Error's songs were often in minor keys, with verses including screaming while choruses featured singing. They made use of emotional vocals, power chords, layered backing tracks, cinematic elements, sampling, electronic drums, glitches, synthesisers, ambient soundscapes and breakdowns. Vocals range between screaming, whispers and falsetto and records often switch back and forth between heavy songs and soft ballads.

RockFlesh writer Matt Fraser described them as "all the songwriting pop sensibilities of Thirty Seconds to Mars, and meld that with the hardcore elements of SeeYouSpaceCowboy". Prelude writer Dom Vigil call them "a superlative blend of stadium-bothering rock and post-punk abrasiveness". Noizze writer Dan Hillier called them "a bold and proud unison of post-rock abrasiveness and composed alt-rock that takes clear and evident inspiration from the cinematic work of composers Kubrick and Aronofsky". RockSound called Victim Of A Modern Age (2022) "Part anthemic masterpiece, part industrial slow-builder".

They cited influences including AFI, the Used, Finch, Green Day, Drab Majesty, Depeche Mode, Boy Harsher, the Elijah, Creeper, My Chemical Romance, 30 Seconds to Mars, Citizen, Rand Aldo, Slow Meadow, In Flames, U2, Muse, Angels & Airwaves, Glassjaw, Nine Inch Nails, Survive, Rival Consoles, Health, Sum 41, Good Charlotte, Superheaven, Bearings and Linkin Park.

=== Imagery and lyrics ===
Modern Error were a concept band, with an overarching narrative continuing through their work, particularly lyrics and music videos. They devised stories first, then music was written to fit that narrative. Lost in the Noise (2019) was a triptych, viewing purpose, belief and insecurity through the lens of existentialism. A study of the human condition and inward emotions. Frontview Magazine compared its lyrics to Friedrich Nietzsche. On Victim Of A Modern Age (2022), they split the narrative into two chapters, which represent lightness and darkness, the latter half being more experimental and electronic. In an interview with Distorted Sound, Zak summarised it as "a protagonist who essentially falls victim to the ways of a modern world, and then finds himself in a new world reflecting on his place in existence. Essentially the whole arc of the concept is becoming what you’re meant to be". The A side followed the protagonist being tempted by technology and the negative impact on him, in a way that mirrors Icarus from Greek mythology. The B side saw the protagonist seeking the meaning of reality, mirroring the resurrection of Jesus and trinity.

Often, the band members performed onstage in all black, with Zak wearing elbow-length black gloves. On a separate occasion, the members wore sky blue shirts, Sun 13 said this is "clearly important and fits the heavy magnetic sound they have". At Download Festival 2022, they wore leather harnesses, BitterSweet press writer Emily Swingle said their clothing "visually embod[ies] the same clashing, exhilarating nature of their sound".

They identified the band's aesthetic as "futuristic minimalism", and cited visual influences from David Lynch, Stanley Kubrick and Darren Aronofsky.

=== Legacy ===
In 2019, NME and Hysteria magazine noted Modern Error as a forefront act in a new wave of heavy British bands, alongside Lotus Eater, Loathe, Holding Absence and God Complex. They were a product of the increased experimentation and genre-fluidity in the UK's heavy music scene of the late 2010s. The Soundboard credited them as "bringing a sense of vitality" to the scene. Prelude credited them as "pushed sonic boundaries" on Victim Of A Modern Age (2022). In the 2020s, they fronted a revival of early 2000s post-hardcore alongside Static Dress.

They have been cited as an influence by Dream State.

== Members ==
- Zak Pinchin – vocals
- Kel Pinchin – guitar

Live members

- Aurélien Mariat – bass (2017–2020)
- Phil Moore – guitar (2017–2023)
- Conor Nicholls – drums (2017–2023)

== Discography ==
Studio albums

- Victim Of A Modern Age (2022)

EPs

- Lost in the Noise (2019)

Collaborations

- "Death (By Modern Error)" (2022, with Bury Tomorrow)
