= The Things They Believe =

Studio album by Loathe
- Released: 7 February 2021
- Genre: Ambient
- Length: 35:33
- Label: SharpTone
- Producer: Loathe

Loathe chronology
I Let It In and It Took Everything (2020)	The Things They Believe (2021)	A Stranger to You (2026)

Professional ratings
Review scores
Source	Rating
Kerrang!	3/5
Metal Hammer	4.5/5 stars
Sputnikmusic	2/5

The Things They Believe is the third studio album by British heavy metal band Loathe and the band's first instrumental album. It was released on 7 February 2021 through SharpTone Records. This is the band's last release with guitarist Connor Sweeney.

== About ==
The Things They Believe is a companion album to the band's previous album, I Let It In and It Took Everything, with the two albums being released exactly one year apart from each other. The album is intended to run parallel to and expand on I Let It In and It Took Everything and provide solace to those in lockdown due to the COVID-19 pandemic.

The album is named after a working title for the 2007 film 30 Days of Night.

== Musical style ==
The Things They Believe is a mostly instrumental album, with vocals only appearing in the intro to "Keep Fighting the Good Fight". The vocals are heavily distorted and are delivered in spoken word by guest musician Peter Vybiral, guitarist of Parting Gift. Other guest musicians include saxophonist John Waugh of The 1975 and violinist Vincent Weight.

The album's sound has been described as noir-like electronic-ambience and compared to the works of Trent Reznor & Atticus Ross, Vangelis, and soundtracks to David Lynch films.

== Track listing ==
All tracks are written by Kadeem France, Erik Bickerstaffe, Connor Sweeney, Feisal El-Khazragi, Sean Radcliffe, and John Waugh.

No.	Title	Length
1.	"The Things They Believe"	2:03
2.	"Don't Get Hurt"	3:19
3.	"'Do You-"	0:31
4.	"Love in Real Time"	2:07
5.	"The Year Everything and Nothing Happened"	2:32
6.	"-Remember-"	1:27
7.	"You Never Came Back"	3:57
8.	"Black Marble"	3:32
9.	"Keep Fighting the Good Fight"	8:59
10.	"Perpetual Sunday Evening"	2:21
11.	"-The Moment?'"	0:55
12.	"The Rain Outside..."	3:45
Total length:		35:33

== Personnel ==
Guest musicians

- John Waugh – saxophone on tracks 1, 3, and 12
- Vincent Weight – violin on tracks 5, 7, 9, and 12
- Peter Vybiral – vocals on track 9

Production

- Loathe – producer, artwork
- Abraham Fihema – mastering
