= The Cold Sun =

Studio album by Loathe
- Released: 14 April 2017
- Studio: Glow in the Dark (Atlanta)
- Genre: Metalcore; progressive metal; djent; nu metalcore
- Length: 34:53
- Label: SharpTone
- Producer: Loathe; Matt McLellan

Loathe chronology
Prepare Consume Proceed (2015)	The Cold Sun (2017)	I Let It In and It Took Everything (2020)

Singles from The Cold Sun
- 1. "Dance on My Skin" Released: 24 February 2017; 2. "It's Yours" Released: 17 March 2017

Professional ratings
Review scores
Source	Rating
Dead Press!	8/10
Distorted Sound	7/10
Kerrang!	3/5 stars
Metal.de	7/10
Metal Hammer	3.5/5 stars
Metal Injection	7.5/10
New Noise Magazine	4/5 stars
Rock Sound	7/10

The Cold Sun is the debut studio album by British heavy metal band Loathe. The album was released on 14 April 2017 through SharpTone Records. The Cold Sun is a concept album about two protagonists in a post-apocalyptic world.

The album received positive reviews from music critics, and the band was nominated for best new band at the 2018 Metal Hammer Golden Gods Awards.

== Musical style ==
The Cold Sun has been described as metalcore, djent, technical metal and nu metalcore containing elements of hardcore punk and electronic music.

== Track listing ==
All tracks are written by Loathe.

No.	Title	Length
1.	"The Cold Sun" (Instrumental)	1:17
2.	"It's Yours"	3:17
3.	"Dance on My Skin"	3:06
4.	"East of Eden"	4:08
5.	"Loathe" (featuring Marawan Abdelmola)	4:30
6.	"3990" (Instrumental)	2:08
7.	"Stigmata"	3:05
8.	"P.U.R.P.L.E."	4:08
9.	"The Omission"	2:59
10.	"Nothing More" (Instrumental)	1:03
11.	"Never More"	0:48
12.	"Babylon..."	4:17

== Personnel ==
Loathe

- Kadeem France – lead vocals
- Erik Bickerstaffe – guitar, vocals
- Connor Sweeney – guitar, backing vocals
- Shayne Smith – bass, backing vocals
- Sean Radcliffe – drums

Additional

- Marawan Abdelmola – additional vocals (track 5)
- Loathe – producer
- Matt McClellan – producer, engineer, mixing, keys
- Troy Glessner – mastering
- Septian Tito – artwork
