= Holding Absence =

Welsh rock band

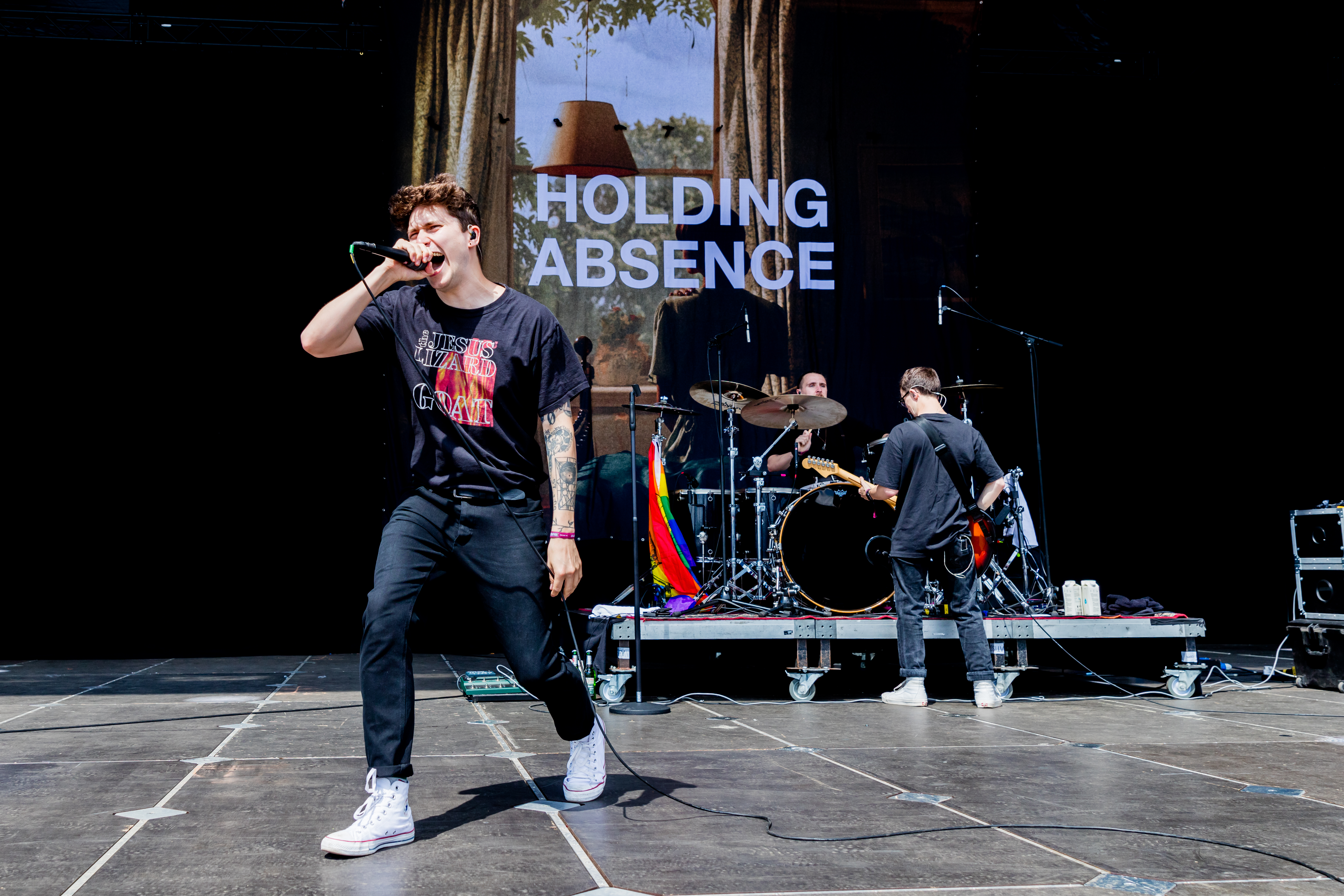
- Holding Absence performing at Download Festival Germany in 2022

Background information
- Origin: Cardiff, Wales
- Genres: Post-hardcore; dreamcore; post-rock; alternative rock; emo
- Years active: 2015–present
- Labels: Sumerian; SharpTone
- Spinoffs: Parting Gift; Gutter
- Members: Lucas Woodland; Scott Carey; Benjamin Elliott
- Past members: Zac Vernon; Giorgio Cantarutti; Feisal El-Khazragi; Chris Smitheram; James Joseph; Ashley Green
- Website: holdingabsence.com

Holding Absence are a Welsh rock band from Cardiff, formed in 2015. As of 2026, none of the founding members remain in the band. The group consists of lead vocalist Lucas Woodland, guitarist Scott Carey, and bassist Benjamin Elliott.

The band released an initial collection of singles in 2017, as well as a split EP with Loathe in 2018, before finally releasing their debut record, Holding Absence, in 2019. They are signed with Sumerian Records.

The band took their name from the title of the song "Holding Your Absence" by Hammock.

== History ==
=== Formation, singles and the This Is as One EP (2015–2018) ===
Following their departure from their previous band Oceans Apart, bassist James Evans and guitarist Giorgio Cantarutti sought to form a melodic hardcore band. The pair hired vocalist Zac Vernon, whom Evans performed alongside in a pop-punk band, as well as second guitarist Feisal El-Khazragi. Holding Absence formed in 2015. Vernon appeared on only their first recorded and released tracks. Their debut single, "Immerse", was released on 21 June 2015, with their second single, "Luna", following soon after. In 2016, Zac left the band and formed Parting Gift, leaving the door open to Lucas Woodland of defunct outfit, Falling With Style.

Upon Woodland joining the band in 2016, Holding Absence released "Permanent", their debut single under this iteration. The band would soon go on to follow up the release of "Permanent" with their contrasting single "Dream of Me", gaining the attention of US-based record label SharpTone Records. In 2017, the band signed with the label, who put out a physical release of the double-A side single Permanent/Dream of Me. The following few months were spent touring the UK alongside several bands, including Blood Youth and We are the Ocean, before eventually performing at the prestigious Download Festival in Donington. Soon after Download, the band released their third single "Penance", a six-minute track about "the journey towards happiness". Before the year was out, the band toured the UK again supporting Young Guns, and soon after released their fourth single "Heaven Knows".

In December 2017, Holding Absence announced a surprise split EP with label mates Loathe, as well as releasing their fifth single "Saint Cecilia". This Is as One was released in March 2018, accompanied by a unique co-headline tour with the two bands. According to Woodland, "the split came about both at a stage in our careers where we could have benefited from releasing music, but also we wanted to do something a little different". This tour was Holding Absence's first foray into European territory and on the UK leg the bands opted to hand-pick the support acts for each date, including artists such as Sleep Token, Modern Error and Parting Gift.

=== Line-up changes and the release of Holding Absence (2018–2019) ===
Soon after returning from the This Is as One tour, founding member and guitarist Feisal El-Khazragi left the band, it was later announced that he had joined Loathe on bass duties.

A new-look Holding Absence (including future guitarists Scott Carey and Chris Smitheram) made their first live appearances at Slam Dunk Festival, before jetting off to Europe again, this time to support Being As An Ocean. The band went on to win the Cardiff Music Award for "Best Breakthrough Band", as well as being nominated at the Heavy Music awards for the "Best UK Breakthrough Band". After finishing the summer by playing sporadic UK festivals Holding Absence went on to close the year off with their biggest tour yet supporting fellow UK post-hardcore band As It Is, alongside Trash Boat and Courage My Love.

In support of this tour, Holding Absence released "Like a Shadow", the first single off the, at the time, unannounced debut album. After the uncertainty with the band's line-up earlier in the year, "Like a Shadow" was seen as a reintroduction to the band and their new line-up.

Later in the year, Holding Absence announced their debut, self-titled record would be released on 8 March 2019. They released 3 more singles before the album release, "Perish", "You Are Everything" and "Monochrome".

Woodland mentions in several interviews how hard the song-writing process was. In regards to El-Khazragi's leaving the band he said that the "line-up change happened not just mid-album, but mid-recording" and how the band "were left having to write and record another half of the album" without him. The record was also recorded in two parts, which caused the band further complications while trying to get it finished. Woodland believes that the changes benefitted the record in the end, as tracks like "Wilt", "Monochrome" and "Like A Shadow" wouldn't have existed if the band remained in its original form.

Holding Absence was finally released via Sharptone Records on 8 March and was instantly received well critically and commercially. Kerrang! gave it 4 out of 5 Ks, stating that the album was a "brilliantly told tale of love and life, and a superb example of how to stretch the limits of what Post-Hardcore can achieve". As well as giving the album a 9/10, Dead Press! expressed, though a long-time coming, Holding Absence "prove[d] that art cannot be rushed, relinquishing a stellar debut that bares the human soul, emotion, and conviction in abundance" Loudwire named it one of the 50 best rock albums of 2019.

In aid of the record release, Holding Absence started touring, playing some of their biggest UK shows to date, joined by Luke Rainsford and The Nightmares. Holding Absence spent the remainder of the year touring Europe with Being As An Ocean and Counterparts in the summer, before returning again alongside Sleeping With Sirens in the winter.

=== Singles, The Greatest Mistake of My Life and The Lost & the Longing EP (2020–2022) ===
On 27 March 2020, the band released a new single entitled "Gravity". On 17 April 2020, the band followed up with the release another new single "Birdcage", in conjunction with the release of a 7" picture disc including both "Gravity" and "Birdcage".

On 21 October 2020, the band announced their second full-length album, The Greatest Mistake of My Life, and released its first single "Beyond Belief". With the release of the second single "Afterlife" on 15 January 2021, Holding Absence announced the departure of bassist James Joseph on amicable terms. On 19 March 2021, the third and final single from the album, "In Circles" was released. The Greatest Mistake of My Life was released on 16 April 2021. It was elected by Loudwire as the 7th best rock/metal album of 2021, and the 5th best rock/metal album of 2021 by Kerrang.

On 8 June 2022, the band released a new single "Aching Longing", and announced a split EP with Alpha Wolf entitled The Lost & the Longing, set to be released on 15 August 2022 via SharpTone and Greyscale Records. On 3 August 2022, the band released their second single "Coffin" from the EP.

=== The Noble Art of Self Destruction (2023–2025) ===
On 1 April 2023, in Leipzig, Germany on tour with Electric Callboy, the band debuted the first single "A Crooked Melody" live off of their at the time unannounced new album, with the single being released soon thereafter on 6 April. On 17 May, the band posted a teaser on social media which consisted of the previous albums' artwork be slowly torn off to reveal the corner of the new album cover. On 19 May, the second single "False Dawn" was released, along with the band announcing their third album The Noble Art of Self Destruction, to be released on 25 August 2023 via SharpTone Records. On 23 June, the third single "Honey Moon" was released. On 21 July, a fourth single "Scissors" was released.

Vocalist and lyricist Lucas Woodland explained the meaning behind the album cover on social media mentioning it to be a completion of a trilogy, embracing oneself and it being like an art project. In an interview with Rock Sound, he went into further depth behind the album title and artwork, mentioning how be was inspired by the Japanese art style of kintsugi of infusing glue with gold in how hardships in life can make you learn and grow as a person, and how you can learn from self-destruction no matter hard it may be and find something beautiful within it.

On 28 October 2024, it was announced that long-time drummer Ashley Green had parted ways with the band "for the foreseeable future", with the reason seemingly being related to touring.

On 20 June 2025, Woodland was featured on the song "Bite My Tongue" by American independent rock band Halocene.

=== Modern Life Is Lonely (2026–present) ===
On 20 March 2026, the band once again appeared to be teasing at new music on their social media.

On 2 April 2026, the band released a new single "Whisper of a Dream", their first new music in 3 years after the completion of their three-album trilogy and their first after signing with a new label, Sumerian Records. On the track, vocalist Lucas Woodland commented:

"Whisper of a Dream is our first song back in what feels like forever. After releasing our third record, The Noble Art of Self-Destruction, it felt essential to step away for a while – to take stock and rediscover who we are as a band. [...] It represents everything Holding Absence has always been, while introducing new elements to our sound and opening the door to what comes next. [...] Lyrically and conceptually, the song draws heavily from cyberpunk media. Contemplation, sentience and dreaming in an ever-evolving world. The music video also introduces our robot mascot "Y4-BB0", a character you'll be seeing more of in the coming years."

On 14 May 2026, the band released another new single "Reflection", along with the artwork and tracklisting of the band's new album being revealed with the band announcing that their new album Modern Life Is Lonely would be released on 28 August 2026 via Sumerian Records, their first with the label.

On 18 June, the band released the third single, "Lucid Love", described by Woodland as a more experimental track and their "most extreme foray" into hyperpop. On 8 August, the band announced that they had delayed the album's release to 18 September. Upon the album's release, the band also released "Heaven" as a single, alongside a music video.

== Musical style ==
Critics have categorised Holding Absence's music as post-hardcore, dreamcore, post-rock, alternative rock and emo. They were a forefront band in the 2010s dreamcore movement, which was based around the YouTube channel Dreambound, where bands merged screamo and melodic hardcore with post-rock and shoegaze. In a 2017 interview bassist James Joseph called their sound "melodic hardcore with post-hardcore elements, combined with post-rock atmospheric".

The band have cited influences including Landscapes, Being as an Ocean, Hundredth, Counterparts, Code Orange, Devin Townsend, Funeral for a Friend, the Blackout, Skindred, Kids in Glass Houses, Bullet for My Valentine, Lower Than Atlantis, Don Broco, the Dillinger Escape Plan, the Chariot, Hammock, Caspian, Alexisonfire, My Bloody Valentine, Thrice, Underoath, Biffy Clyro, 30 Seconds To Mars, the Wombats, Stick to Your Guns, Radiohead, Fall Out Boy, Architects, the 1975, Purity Ring, Gracie Fields, Gallows, My Chemical Romance, Linkin Park, the Cure, Siouxsie and the Banshees, Joy Division and Deftones. In 2018, Woodland and Loathe vocalist Kadeem France said that their bands mutually "inspire each other".

They have been cited as an influence by Casey, Caskets, Currents, Delaire the Liar, Dream State, Graphic Nature, Heriot, Lastelle and Lotus Eater.

== Members ==
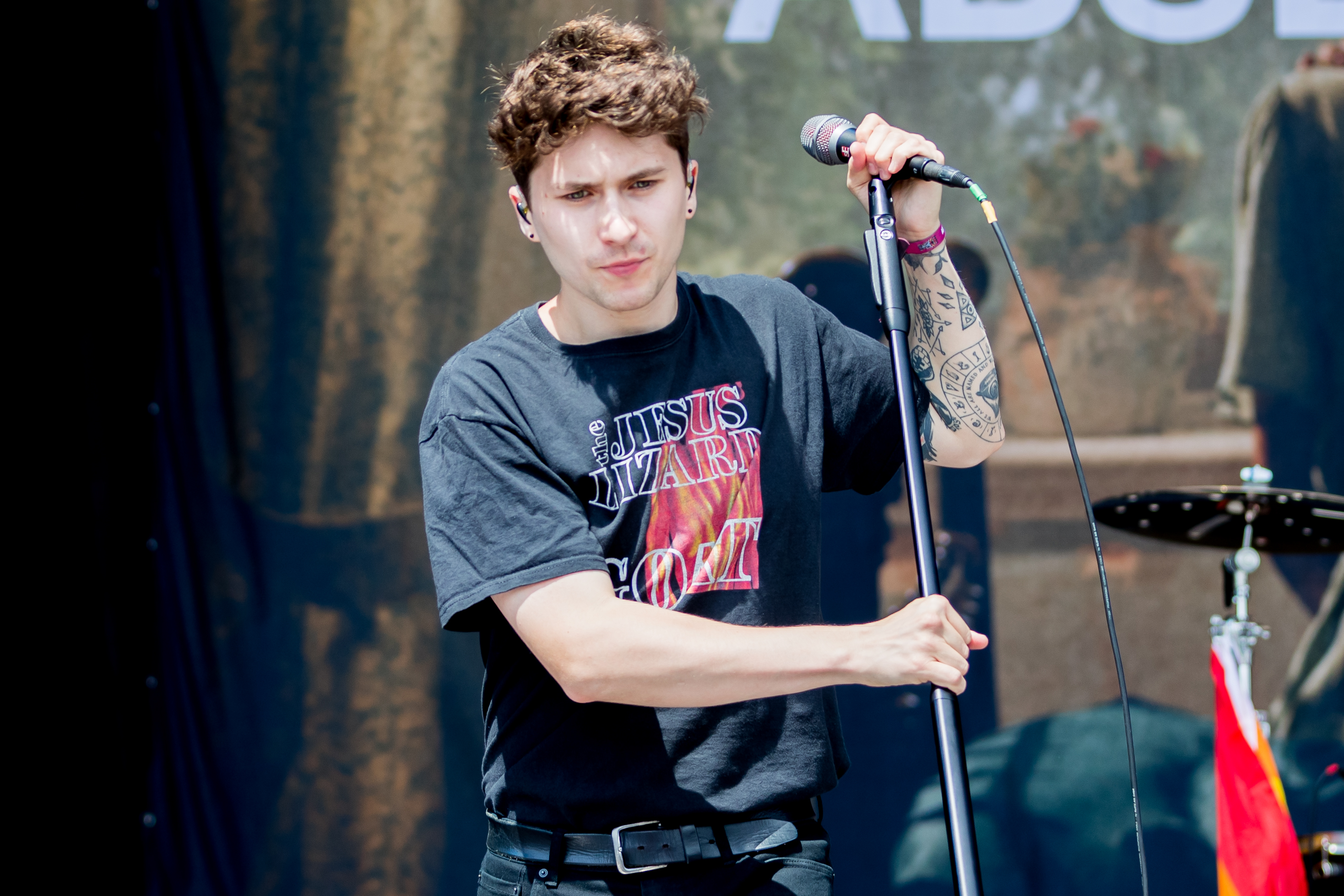
Lucas Woodland

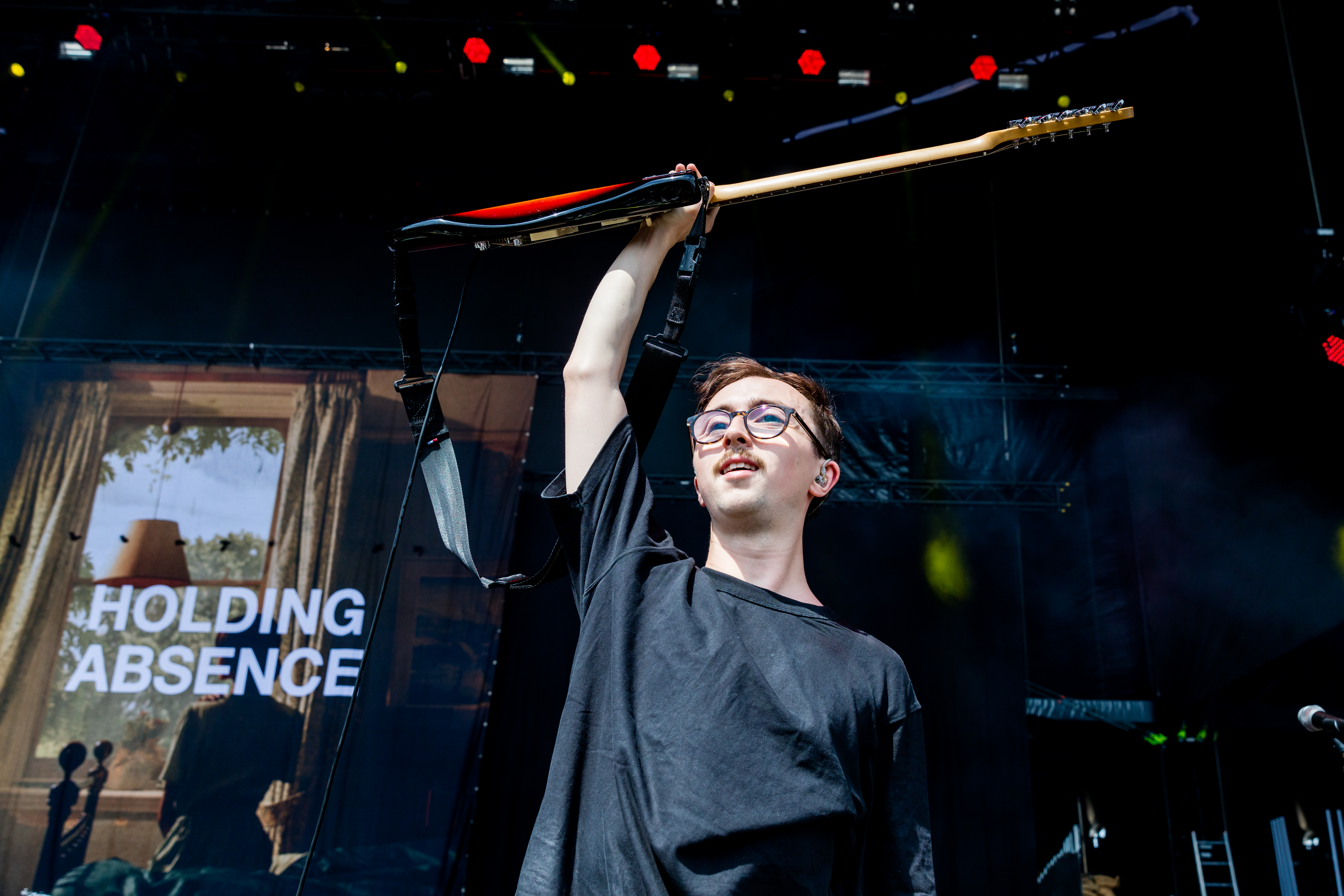
Scott Carey

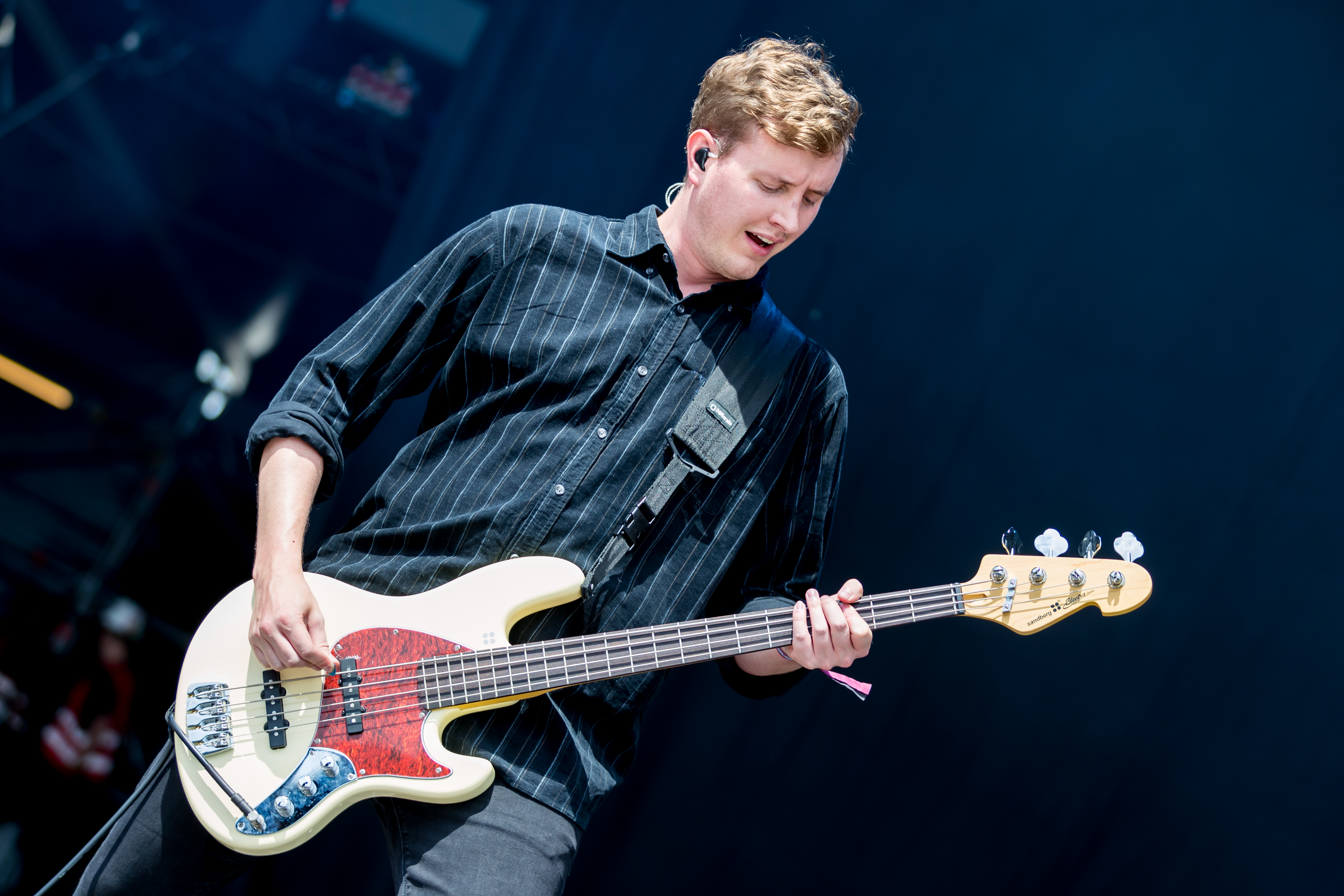
Benjamin Elliott

Current members

- Lucas Woodland – vocals, keyboards, piano, acoustic guitar (2016–present)
- Scott Carey – guitar (2018–present), backing vocals (2021–present)
- Benjamin Elliott – bass (2021–present)

Former members

- James Joseph (James Evans) – bass (2015–2021)
- Giorgio Cantarutti – guitar (2015–2017)
- Zac Vernon – vocals (2015–2016)
- Feisal El-Khazragi – guitar (2015, 2016–2018)
- Tom Fry – drums (2015)
- Jack Twomey – drums (2015)
- Sam Matthews – guitar (2015)
- Ashley Green – drums (2015–2024)
- Chris Smitheram – guitar (2018–2019)

Current touring members

- Scott Waters – drums (2024–present)

Former touring members

- Olly Meager – guitar (2017–2018)
- Toby Evans – guitar, backing vocals (2021–2024)
- Michael McGough – guitar, backing vocals (2022)

== Discography ==
Holding Absence discography
- Studio albums: 4
- EPs: 2
- Singles: 27
- Music videos: 24

=== Albums ===
List of albums, with selected details and chart positions
Title	Album details	Peak chart positions			
Title	Album details	UK	UK Rock	UK Indie	SCO
Holding Absence	Released: 8 March 2019; Label: SharpTone; Format: Music download, CD and vinyl	—	6	22	19
The Greatest Mistake of My Life	Released: 16 April 2021; Label: SharpTone; Format: Music download, CD and vinyl	90	6	4	71
The Noble Art of Self Destruction	Released: 25 August 2023; Label: SharpTone; Format: Music download, CD and vinyl	67	3	3	29
Modern Life Is Lonely	Released: 18 September 2026; Label: Sumerian; Format: Music download, CD and vinyl	— (Note: Modern Life Is Lonely did not enter the UK Albums Chart, but peaked at number 26 on the UK Album Downloads Chart.)	5	16	35

=== EPs ===
List of EPs, with selected details
Title	EP details
This Is as One	Released: 16 February 2018; Label: SharpTone; Format: Music download and Vinyl; Notes: Split EP with Loathe
The Lost & the Longing	Released: 15 August 2022; Label: SharpTone; Format: Music download; Notes: Split EP with Alpha Wolf

=== Singles ===
List of singles
Title	Year	Album
"Immerse"	2015	Non-album singles
"Luna"	2015	Non-album singles
"Permanent"	2016	Non-album singles
"Dream of Me"	2017	Non-album singles
"Penance"	2017	Non-album singles
"Heaven Knows"	2017	Non-album singles
"Saint Cecilia"	2017	This Is as One
"Like a Shadow"	2018	Holding Absence
"Perish"	2019	Holding Absence
"You Are Everything"	2019	Holding Absence
"Monochrome"	2019	Holding Absence
"Gravity"	2020	Non-album singles
"Birdcage"	2020	Non-album singles
"Beyond Belief"	2020	The Greatest Mistake of My Life
"Afterlife"	2021	The Greatest Mistake of My Life
"In Circles"	2021	The Greatest Mistake of My Life
"Aching Longing" (featuring Alpha Wolf)	2022	The Lost & The Longing
"Coffin"	2022	The Lost & The Longing
"A Crooked Melody"	2023	The Noble Art of Self Destruction
"False Dawn"	2023	The Noble Art of Self Destruction
"Honey Moon"	2023	The Noble Art of Self Destruction
"Scissors"	2023	The Noble Art of Self Destruction
"Whisper of a Dream"	2026	Modern Life Is Lonely
"Reflection"	2026	Modern Life Is Lonely
"Lucid Love"	2026	Modern Life Is Lonely
"Modern Life Is Lonely"	2026	Modern Life Is Lonely
"Heaven"	2026	Modern Life Is Lonely

=== Guest appearances ===
Title	Year	Other artist(s)	Album/Mixtape
"Dial Tones X"	2025	As It Is	Never Happy, Ever After X
"Bite My Tongue"	2025	Halocene	When Love Dies

=== Music videos ===
List of music videos
Title	Year	Director	Link
"Immerse"	2015	Zak Pinchin	
"Permanent"	2016	Ashley Green	
"Dream of Me"	2017	Ashley Green	
"Penance"	2017	Life Is Art Visuals and Holding Absence	
"Heaven Knows"	2017	Ashlea Bea and Holding Absence	
"Saint Cecilia"	2017	Zak Pinchin	
"Everything"	2018	Ashley Green	
"Like a Shadow"	2018	Zak Pinchin	
"Perish"	2019	Zak Pinchin	
"You Are Everything"	2019	Bethan Miller	
"Monochrome"	2019	Life Is Art Visuals	
"Gravity"	2020	Zak Pinchin	
"Beyond Belief"	2020	Lewis Cater	
"Afterlife"	2021	Lewis Cater	
"In Circles"	2021	Zak Pinchin	
"Nomoreroses"	2021	Zak Pinchin and Bethan Miller	
"Coffin"	2022	Zak Pinchin	
"A Crooked Melody"	2023	Lewis Cater	
"False Dawn"	2023	Third Eye Visuals	
"Her Wings"	2023	Lewis Cater	
"Whisper Of A Dream"	2026	Zak Pinchin	
"Reflection"	2026	Zak Pinchin	
"Lucid Love"	2026	Animated	
"Heaven"	2026	Dan Land	
