= I Let It In and It Took Everything =

Studio album by Loathe
- Released: 7 February 2020
- Recorded: August 2018 – October 2019
- Genres: Metalcore; post-metal; nu metalcore; djent
- Length: 49:19
- Label: SharpTone
- Producer: Loathe

Loathe chronology
The Cold Sun (2017)	I Let It In and It Took Everything (2020)	The Things They Believe (2021)

Singles from I Let It In and It Took Everything
- 1. "Gored" Released: 20 September 2019; 2. "New Faces in the Dark" Released: 20 September 2019; 3. "Aggressive Evolution" Released: 29 November 2019; 4. "Two-Way Mirror" Released: 10 January 2020

I Let It In and It Took Everything is the second studio album by British heavy metal band Loathe, released on 7 February 2020 through SharpTone Records.

== Composition ==
Critics have categorised the album as metalcore, post-metal and djenty nu metalcore. The album makes use of contrast between dual clean and unclean vocals, as well as downtuned guitars, low-pitched atmospherics and shoegaze guitar textures. In an article for Metal Hammer, the album was referred to as opening "the band's sound up to lush, shoegaze textures and shimmering guitars". The eleventh track, "Heavy Is the Head That Falls with the Weight of a Thousand Thoughts", borders black metal. Multiple journalists have compared the album to Deftones, citing frontman Kadeem France's similar vocal style to Chino Moreno's.

== Critical reception ==
Professional ratings
Review scores
Source	Rating
Dead Press!	9/10
Distorted Sound	9/10
Kerrang!	4/5
Metal Hammer	4/5 stars
Metal Storm	7.5/10
Ox-Fanzine	4/5 stars
Pitchfork	7.8/10

I Let It In and It Took Everything received critical acclaim. Max Heilman of Riff Magazine called the album "a grand metalcore vision" and that it pushes "the boundaries of what heavy music can be while avoiding gimmicks altogether". Metal Hammer writer Remfry Dedman called it "impossible to pigeonhole" and believed it would "be instrumental in putting [Loathe] on the map as one of the most exciting bands to emerge from the British underground in a long time." Kerrang! writer Jake Richardson described the album as blending "their metallic crunch with ambient sounds, melodic guitars and elements of niche genres like shoegaze", and praising it for being able to "switch from vast sounding post-rock to chugging, dissonant metal with consummate ease". Loudwire described it as "a jaw-smacking awakening to the new breed of hardcore that gyrates with elastic, djenty grooves and trace of industrial-like propulsion. With their nothing-to-lose fits of rage, Loathe are primed for a breakout on their second record".

I Let It In and It Took Everything was listed as one of the best albums of 2020 by Alternative Press, Distorted Sound, HM Magazine, Kerrang!, Metal Hammer, Revolver, and Sputnikmusic. Loudwire named it the best metal album released that year. The album was also nominated in the "Best Production" category at the Heavy Music Awards 2021.

== Track listing ==
No.	Title	Length
1.	"Theme"	1:23
2.	"Aggressive Evolution"	3:27
3.	"Broken Vision Rhythm" (featuring Harry Rule of God Complex)	2:36
4.	"Two-Way Mirror"	5:00
5.	"451 Days"	1:39
6.	"New Faces in the Dark"	3:12
7.	"Red Room"	2:03
8.	"Screaming"	5:55
9.	"Is It Really You?"	4:48
10.	"Gored"	3:08
11.	"Heavy Is the Head That Falls with the Weight of a Thousand Thoughts"	4:18
12.	"A Sad Cartoon"	5:16
13.	"A Sad Cartoon (Reprise)"	1:15
14.	"I Let It In and It Took Everything..." (featuring Vincente Void)	5:20
Total length:		49:19

== Personnel ==
Adapted from liner notes.

Loathe
- Kadeem France – lead vocals
- Erik Bickerstaffe – guitars, co-lead vocals
- Connor Sweeney – guitars, backing vocals
- Feisal El-Khazragi – bass guitar, backing vocals
- Sean Radcliffe – drums, programming
Production
- Loathe – production, mixing, art
- George Lever – mixing
- Lewis Johns – drum engineering
- Jens Bogren – mastering

== Charts ==
Chart performance for I Let It In and It Took Everything
Chart (2020)	Peak position
UK Album Downloads (Official Charts)	92
UK Albums Sales (OCC)	87
UK Independent Albums (Official Charts)	31
UK Physical Albums (OCC)	88
UK Rock & Metal Albums (Official Charts)	10
UK Vinyl Albums (OCC)	20
