= Outworld (album) =

Studio album by Black Coast
- Released: 19 November 2021
- Genre: Nu metal; alternative metal
- Label: Paradise Recordings; Blood Blast Distribution
- Producer: Sam Bloor

Black Coast chronology
Ill Minds Vol. 2 (2019)	Outworld (2021)	Black Coast (2023)

Black Coast studio album chronology
Outworld (2021)

Outworld is the debut studio album by English nu metal band Black Coast, released on 19 November 2021.

== Background ==
The album was intended to be funded by a £10,000 IndieGoGo campaign, which reached 11% of its goal before closing.

Lyrical themes expressed across the album deal with vocalist Charlie Hewitt's mental health and addiction problems, notably the song "Addict".

Hewitt describes "Ache", the first track, as follows:

"Ache has a mixture of meanings, I like to think this one was born out of all the shit we have been through in the years as a band. As people it’s that sum of all the problems we’ve faced but being very good at hiding them from each other and from the people listening when in fact we are just as the line says, ‘embracing the chaos’. Surrounding ourselves, life is hard and everyone has different things going on but l like to think this song brings us together to say ‘fuck you’ to those problems."

"Mental", for which a music video was created, is introduced by Hewitt as:

"This song is both a question and reflection on trying to break out of that mindset and realising what you actually have got in front of you. You are a human, you are real, you're not the only one like this and you can change the parts that want to break you if you choose to."

The band promoted the release of the album through a live show with fellow bands Moralslip, Freeza and Mercury.

== Reception ==
A 9/10 star rating came from Laviea Thomas of Gigwise, describing the band as "outsiders with one intention and one intention only—to open up this fucking pit." Iain McCallum of HiFiWay also gave the album a positive review, stating that it "got [his] attention and will have yours too." Alasdair Belling of Hysteria Mag rated the album 7, who praised the songwriting and vocal delivery but was less satisfied by its dynamic range.

The album has been compared to the material of Deftones and Architects.

== Track listing ==
No.	Title	Length
1.	"Ache"	3:36
2.	"Paradise"	3:19
3.	"Addict"	3:51
4.	"Mental"	4:05
5.	"Vodka Smile"	3:07
6.	"Void"	3:38
7.	"Outworld"	2:55
8.	"Twisted"	1:05
9.	"Burn"	2:31
10.	"Daydream"	4:30
11.	"Domino Rose"	3:09
12.	"Strangers Skin"	3:14

== Personnel ==
- Charlie Hewitt – vocals
- Scott Pinnington – guitar
- Joe Mayer – guitar
- Jack Beardsall – bass
- Matty Clark – drums
