= Black Coast (band) =

British metal band

- Origin: Stoke-on-Trent, England
- Genres: Nu metalcore, nu metal, metalcore
- Years active: 2016–present
- Members: Charlie Hewitt; Scott Pinnington; Joe Mayer; Jack Beardsall; Matty Clark

Black Coast is an English nu metal band from Stoke-on-Trent, England.

== History ==
=== Formation and Ill Minds Vol. 1 (2016–2020) ===
The band was formed in January 2016 following the folding of the bands "Bet It All" and "Dead City Souls". The idea was originally pitched by Scott Pinnington to fellow guitarist Joe Mayer, who then invited bassist Jack Beardsall and drummer Matty Clark, with Charlie Hewitt finally arriving after a small number of practice sessions.

The name "Black Coast" was created by an ex-member of a different band, which was ultimately never used; Mayer then reiterated the name when the newly-formed band was looking for one.

A debut EP was released which resulted in a tour with Stray from the Path, with the band later touring Japan and supporting the bands Silent Screams and In Hearts Wake. The EP Ill Minds Vol. 1 was released on 9 November 2018.

=== Outworld and self-titled extended play (2021–present) ===
Black Coast released the song "Paradise" on 7 April 2021 as the lead single from their album Outworld, which would be released later that year. The recording process of the album proved to be problematic, with several songs not working out as they were conceived to be, as well as members facing writer's block, which they decided to remedy via covering the song A Place for My Head. The COVID-19 pandemic bought the band extra time to work on the album, which was in a complete state upon the release of "Paradise".

The second single from the album, "Strangers Skin", was released on 3 August.

Originally intended to be released on 27 August, Outworld was ultimately postponed to a 19 November release.

The band announced a self-titled EP in January 2023 with the lead single "Mercy". Released on 28 April 2023, a promotional UK-wide tour commenced.

A second full-length album is apparently planned for Spring 2026.

== Musical style and influences ==
Black Coast have been described as nu metal, metalcore and nu metalcore. They self-identify as melodic hardcore. The band have cited their musical influences as being "all about the groove", with grunge band Alice in Chains, nu metal pioneers Limp Bizkit, Linkin Park and Deftones, and nu metal revivalists Ocean Grove being highlighted by Hewitt as specific examples.

Other influences they have cited include Korn, Loathe, The Neighbourhood, Staind, Stray From The Path, Architects, Stick To Your Guns, While She Sleeps, Pantera, Rage Against The Machine, Metallica, A Perfect Circle, and Landscapes,

== Discography ==
=== Studio albums ===
- Outworld (2021)

=== EPs ===
- Crows Of The North (2016)
- Ill Minds Vol. 1 (2018)
- Ill Minds Vol. 2 (2019)
- The Isolation Tapes (2020)
- Black Coast (2023)

== Members ==
- Charlie Hewitt – Vocals (2016 – Present)
- Scott Pinnington – Guitar (2016 – Present)
- Alex Huzar - Guitar (2025 – Present)
- Jack Beardsall – Bass (2016 – Present)
- Matty Clark – Drums (2016 – Present)

- Joe Mayer – Guitar (2016 – 2025)
