= Lotus Eater =

Scottish metalcore band

- Also known as: As Daylight Fades (2014–2016)
- Origin: Glasgow, Scotland, U.K.
- Genres: Metalcore; nu metal; progressive metal
- Years active: 2014–2021
- Label: Hopeless
- Spinoffs: Love is Noise
- Past members: Aidan Cooper; Cameron Humphrey; Jordan Barr; Matty Clarke; Roland Walet; Jamie McLees; Douglas Park; Alan Ross; Jack Dutton; Paul Collins
- Website: Official website

Lotus Eater (formerly As Daylight Fades) were a Scottish heavy metal band from Glasgow. Playing a style that puts a heavy emphasis on rhythm and downtuning, they have been cited by publications such as NME and Metal Hammer as helping to lead the new wave of heavy music in Britain alongside groups like Loathe, Modern Error and Holding Absence.

== History ==
On 17 February 2015, they opened for Incite at their Glasgow headline show. On 22 January 2016, they released their single "Novaturient", which was accompanied by a music video. On 27 May 2016, they released their debut EP Love // Loss. From 24 June to 11 August, they toured the UK in support of the EP.

Jamie McLees' entrance into the band in late 2016 led to a distinctive musical shift into a sound much darker and heavier. Partly because of this, As Daylight Fades changed their name and rebranded into Lotus Eater. On 26 February 2017, they released the single "Dead to Me". 24 March 2017, they released their self-titled debut EP. In July 2018, they signed to Hopeless Records, making them the first UK band to be signed to the label. The announcement was accompanied by the release of the single "Break It" and its music video. On 19 July 2018, they released the singles "Branded" and "Crooked". On 31 October 2018, they opened for Neck Deep at their Halloween, sold-out, headline show in Manchester alongside Parting Gift and Strains. In March 2019, they opened for Blood Youth on their UK headline tour, alongside Palm Reader. The band opened for Make Them Suffer on their May 2019 UK tour. From 2–9 June 2019, they toured the UK alongside Modern Error.

On 10 August 2019, they performed at Bloodstock Festival. From 7–17 October 2019, they opened for Issues on their European headline tour. On 29 October 2019, they released the single "Freaks" featuring rapper Freddie Sunshine. In August 2020, founding guitarist Alan Ross left the band after their show at Bloodstock. In the meantime, Jack Dutton (Ex Parting Gift) joined the band as replacement. On 20 November 2019, they released the single "Second to None". The band were featured on Bring Me the Horizon's 24 minutes song "Underground Big {HEADFULOFHYENA}", as a part of their Music to Listen To... album, which was released on 27 December 2019.

On 12 March 2020, they released the song "Narco", which was accompanied by a music video. During this time, Park and Dutton departed from the band, reforming with a new line-up containing Paul Collins and Aidan Cooper formerly of MTXS as replacements. Shortly after this, McCulloch and McLees also left the band for unrelated reasons.

On 26 March 2021, they released a music video for the single "Vermin", which was accompanied by the announcement of a new line-up. In this line-up, Humphrey was the only member that remained, with Collins becoming the band's vocalist and Cooper becoming the guitarist. On 24 June 2021, they released the single "Obliterate", which features Bring Me the Horizon vocalist Oliver Sykes, and announced their debut album, Where the Body Goes would be released on 23 July.

On 9 July 2021, two weeks before the release of their debut album, Lotus Eater announced that they were disbanding, following three women's accusations of sexual and physical abuse from Collins being posted in social media. Collins responded by describing the allegations as untrue and defamatory, and stating that he intended to take legal action. After splitting up the band pulled the release of the album with Humphrey stating that it "will never see the light of day".

In October of that year, Humphrey announced his new project Love is Noise in which he is on vocals. Following this, guitarist Aidan Cooper was announced as the new vocalist for the nu-core band, Sunfall.

== Musical style and influences ==
The band's music has been categorised by critics as metalcore, technical metal and nu metal, often incorporating elements of technical death metal, grindcore and avant-garde music. They often self-describe their music as simply "gloom". They have cited influences including Meshuggah, Linkin Park and Korn.

Lotus Eater makes heavy use of percussive, groove-driven instrumentation on all instruments. Lyrically, their songs often discuss painful life experiences and mental health issues. Guitars are generally down-tuned. A 2020 article by Kerrang!, described their music as a "cocktail of anger, aggression, despair, violence and feral rage", which Park explained by saying "Being from Glasgow, there’s always that underlying aggression and angst... when you come from here you need to be streetwise and aware of yourself. You need to know who you are and who you’re talking to. It’s a city with one of the highest crime rates proportional to population". Metal Hammer described it as an "amalgam of death core, tech-metal and just outright, unfiltered naked aggression".

As Daylight Fades was described by critics as metalcore and post-rock It made use of elements of technical metal and hardcore punk and was often melodic and emotional. Metal Hammer described them as "powerful, emotive and pure"

== Members ==
Former

- Jordan Barr – vocals, drums (2014–2016)
- Matty Clarke – vocals (2016–2017)
- Roland Walet – bass (2016–2017)
- Cameron Humphrey – drums, backing vocals (2016–2021)
- Jamie McLees – vocals (2017–2020)
- Douglas Park – guitar (2014–2020), bass (2014–2016, 2017–2018)
- Alan Ross – guitar (2014–2019), bass (2014–2016, 2017–2018)
- Craig McCulloch - bass (2018-2020)
- Jack Dutton - guitar (2019-2020, formerly of Parting Gift)
- Paul Collins – vocals (2020–2021, formerly of MTXS)
- Aidan Cooper – guitar, bass (2020–2021, formerly of MTXS)

Touring

- Adam Jones - bass (2021), of Gutter, formerly of Cutting Teeth)

== Discography ==
=== Studio albums ===
List of studio albums
Title	Details
Where the Body Goes	Release: 30 July 2021 (cancelled); Label: Hopeless

=== Extended plays ===
Title	Details
Love // Loss (as As Daylight Fades)	Released: 27 May 2016; Label: Independent
Lotus Eater	Released: 24 March 2017; Label: Independent
Social Hazard	Released: 29 March 2019; Label: Hopeless

=== Singles ===
Title	Year	Album
"Novaturient"	2016	Love // Loss
"Crooked"	2016	Lotus Eater
"Dead to Me"	2017	Lotus Eater
"Branded"	2018	Non-album single
"Break It"	2018	Non-album single
"The Fear"	2018	Social Hazard
"Mother"	2019	Social Hazard
"Freaks" (featuring Freddie Sunshine)	2019	Non-album single
"Second to None"	2019	Non-album single
"Narco"	2020	Where the Body Goes
"Vermin"	2021	Where the Body Goes
"Obliterate" (featuring Oliver Sykes)	2021	Where the Body Goes

=== As featured artist ===
Title	Artist	Year
"Underground Big {HEADFULOFHYENA}"	Bring Me the Horizon featuring Bexey and Lotus Eater	2019
