= Love Is Noise (band) =

Scottish rock band

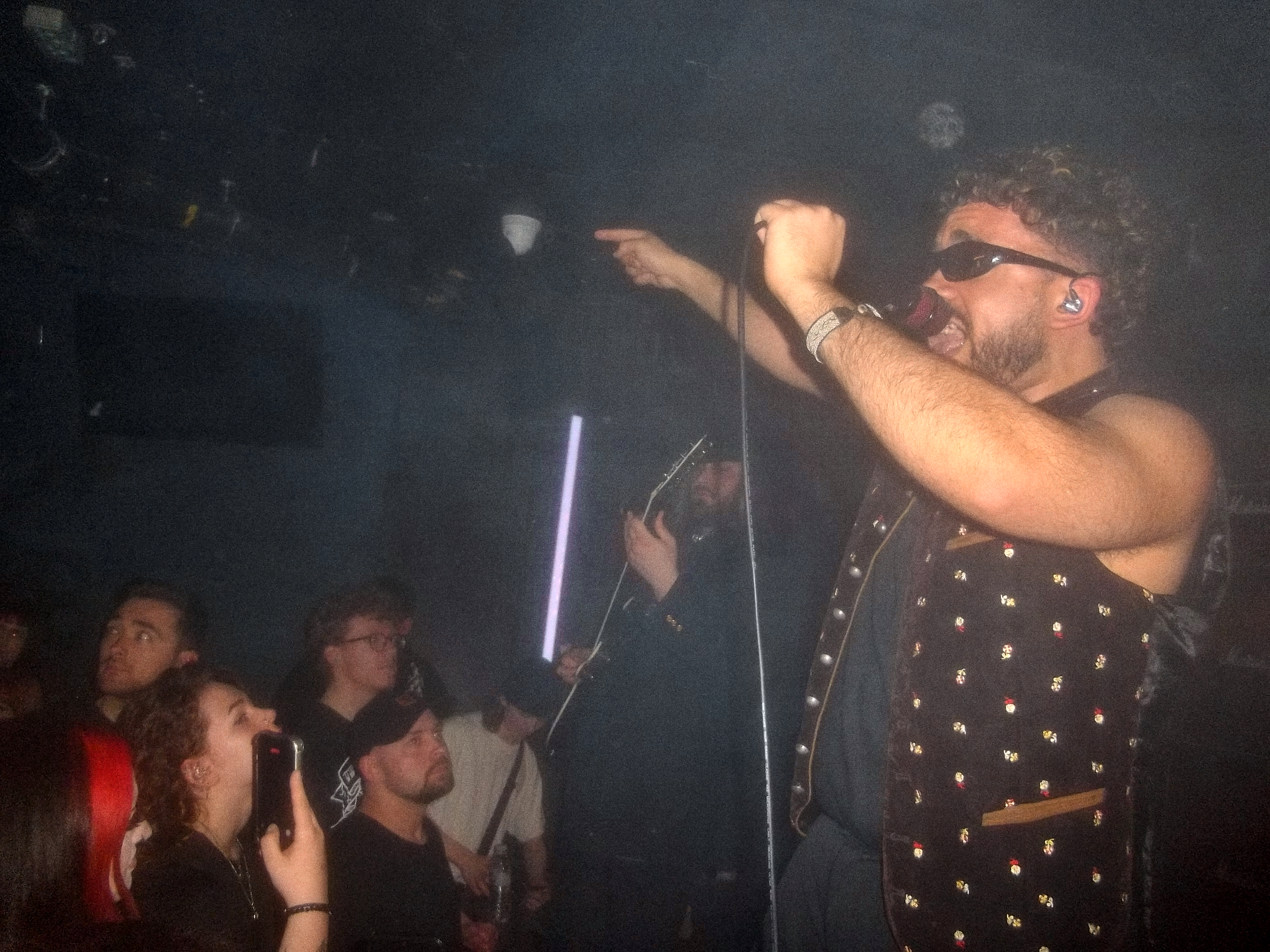
- Love Is Noise performed live in 2026

Background information
- Origin: Nottingham, Nottinghamshire, UK
- Genres: Alternative metal; shoegaze; dreamcore; metalcore; post-hardcore
- Years active: 2021–present
- Labels: Century Media; 333 Wreckords Crew
- Spinoff of: Lotus Eater
- Members: Cameron Humphrey; Sam Clark; Alex Ioannou
- Past members: Tom Mellon; Ed Sutton; Lewis Smith; Joe Pink
- Website: loveisnoise.world

Love Is Noise is a British rock band from Nottingham. Formed in 2021, following the disbandment of Lotus Eater, the band was originally a duo consisting of Tom Mellon (guitar) and Cameron Humphrey (vocals, drums, guitar). They released their debut EP Euphoria, Where Were You? in 2022, establishing a genre-fluid musical style rooted in alternative metal, metalcore and shoegaze. Their debut full-length, To Live in a Different Way, was released in 2025, which saw a stylistic shift towards dreamcore and the influence of post-rock.

== History ==
Tom Mellon (guitar) and Cameron Humphrey (vocals, drums, guitar) formed Love Is Noise in October 2021. The two met through Instagram following the disbandment of Humphrey's band Lotus Eater. They officially formed in Nottingham. They took their name from the song "Love Is Noise" by the Verve. They released their debut single "Pillowcase" on 10 December 2021. On 28 January 2022, they released the single "Azure". Their debut EP Euphoria, Where Were You was premiered on 25 October 2022, by Rock Sound. Soon, Ed Sutton joined as the band's drummer. On 19 May 2023, they released the single "In the Shadow of Your Former Self", followed on 5 July by "Boutique".

On 5 September 2024, they released the single "Take on Minute", announcing it would be a part of their debut album To Live In A Different Way, which would be released on 14 February 2025. By this time, Mellon had left the band. The album was recorded with a lineup consisting of Humphrey, Mellon, Lewis Smith (bass) and Louis Giannamore (drums). On 27 June 2025, they released the single "All Eyes Shut", featuring Loathe guitarist Erik Bickerstaffe. On 10 September 2025, they released the single "Everyone Bleeds", and announced their new lineup was drummer Joe Pink, bassist Sam Clark and guitarist/vocalist Alex Ioannou. Between 30 November and 17 December, they toured European supporting Loathe, alongside Zetra.

== Musical style ==
Critics have categorised Love Is Noise's music as metalcore, shoegaze, alternative metal, dreamcore and post-hardcore. They incorporate elements of grunge, hardcore punk, indie rock, doom metal, post-rock, post-punk, post-grunge, blackgaze, nu metal and Britrock. They are a part of a movement of bands emphasising the shoegaze elements of Deftones, which some critics have called "Deftones-core", alongside Mood Ring and Thornhill. Rock Sound writer Jack Rogers called their music "boundary-obliterating".

Their songs are often based around dynamics and half time rhythms, as well as blast beats ambient guitar textures, soul-style singing, screamed vocals and falsetto singing.

On To Live In A Different Way (2025), they shifted their sound towards the post-rock-influence dreamcore genre. Of this change, Humphrey stated in an interview with Ragamuffins that, "People would have expected us to create an alternative metal album... on purpose we didn't want to do that because we wanted to be like, 'Okay, that's what you want us to do. Let's do something completely different.'" Instead, the album was influenced by Mogwai, Explosions in the Sky and This Will Destroy You.

They have cited influences including Underoath, the 1975, Dream Theater, Deafheaven, Depeche Mode, Turnstile, Loathe, Thornhill, Bodyweb, Cauldron, Orthodox, Psycho-Frame, Jutes, Boundaries, Sullii, AFI, Thirty Seconds to Mars, Pierce the Veil, Pity Sex, Citizen, Dying Wish, Architects, Meshuggah, the Contortionist, Sanction, Speed, Pain of Truth, Vein.fm, Sanguisugabogg, PeelingFlesh, Paramore, McFly, Jonas Brothers, Olivia Dean, Sombr, Djo, the Moving Stills, Brayton, Triple One, Dogpark, Evanescence, A Perfect Circle, Crossfade, Breaking Benjamin, Flawed Mangoes, Desolated, Malevolence, Unkle, Soundgarden, Massive Attack, DJ Shadow, My Bloody Valentine, Smashing Pumpkins, Deftones and Radiohead.

They have been cited as an influence by Split Chain.

== Members ==
Current

- Cameron Humphrey – vocals, guitar (2021–present), drums (2021–2022)
- Sam Clark – bass (2025–present)
- Alex Ioannou – guitar, vocals (2025–present)

Former

- Tom Mellon – guitar (2021–2025)
- Ed Sutton – drums (2022–2024)
- Lewis Smith – bass (2025)
- Louis Giannamore – drums (2025)
- Joe Pink – drums (2025)

== Discography ==
Studio albums

- To Live in a Different Way (2025)

EPs

- The Nowhere Sessions (2022)
- Euphoria, Where Were You? (2022)
- The Space Between Happiness and Heartache. (2026)

Singles

- "Deja Vu (without you)" (2021)
- "Pillowcase" (2021)
- "Azure" (2022)
- "Movement" (feat. Jason Aalon Butler) (2022)
- "Euphoria (where were you?)" (2022)
- "In the shadow of your former self." (2023)
- "Boutique" (2023)
- "Memento" (2023)
- "Soft Glow" (2024)
- "Jawbreaker" (2024)
- "take.one.minute" (2024)
- "To Live in a Different Way" (2024)
- "Sunshine" (2025)
- "Hole in Me" (2025)
- "All Eyes Shut" (feat. Erik Bickerstaffe) (2025)
- "Everyone Bleeds" (2025)
- "Smile." (2026)
- "The Rain That Follows Me." (2026)

Singles as featured artist

- Nik Nocturnal – "Moan" (with Love Is Noise) (2023)
- Paleskin – "Valentina" (feat. Love Is Noise) (2025)
- Make Your Own Monster – "Flypaper" (feat. Love Is Noise) (2026)
- Echochamber – Dead to Me (feat. Love Is Noise) (2026)
