= Phoxjaw =

British rock band

- Origin: Bristol, England
- Genres: Alternative rock; alternative metal; post-hardcore
- Years active: 2016–present
- Label: Hassle
- Members: Danny Garland; Josh Gallop; Alexander Share; Kieran Gallop
- Website: phoxjaw.com

Phoxjaw is a British rock band from Bristol, formed in 2016.

== History ==
The band formed in 2016 from the remnants of the bands Day of a Thousand and Black Elephant and consisted of singer and bassist Danny Garland, Kieran Gallop on drums, and guitarists Glenn Hawkins and Josh Gallop. The latter also works as a sound engineer and produced the band's first releases. The band's name is derived from the word "foxjaw" and has no special meaning. To be provocative, the "F" was replaced by a "Ph".

A year later, Phoxjaw released their first single "Victorian Dolls" and shortly afterwards brought keyboardist Huw Allen into the band. The first EP Goodbye Dinosaur followed at the end of 2018 before Phoxjaw was signed to Hassle Records. The second EP A Playground for Sad Adults was released in 2019. Both EPs were re-released together a year later.

On 3 July 2020, the band released their debut album Royal Swan, which was produced in Wales by Lewis Johns. At the 2021 Heavy Music Awards, Phoxjaw was nominated in the Best UK Breakthrough Band category and Royal Swan in the Best Album Artwork category, but the awards went to Wargasm and Dance Gavin Dance respectively. In the summer of 2022, Phoxjaw played the Download Festival. They also recorded their second studio album Not Very Nice Cream, which was scheduled for release on 11 November 2022 but was not actually released until 2 June 2023.

== Musical style ==
John D. Buchanan of AllMusic described Phoxjaw as indie rockers who play a "raw, grimy, driving, and intense yet melodic sound" heavily influenced by grunge and British post-hardcore of the 2000s. Christian Biehl of Ox fanzine described their music as a "cross between modern metal with alternative rock, wave and a dash of madness." Jake Richardson of UK magazine Kerrang! wrote that their music was "blend of various genres and sounds that, on the face of it, shouldn’t quite work so well together." German magazine Visions recommended Phoxjaw to fans of Glassjaw, Stone Sour or Every Time I Die. Punktastic stated that the band sound like "the bastard child of The Horrors and The Eighties Matchbox B-Line Disaster".

== Members ==
- Danny Garland – vocals, bass (2016–present)
- Alexander Share – guitar (2018–present)
- Josh Gallop – guitar (2016–present)
- Kieran Gallop – drums (2016–present)
- Huw Allen – keyboards (2017–2019)

== Discography ==
Studio albums

- 2020: Royal Swan (Hassle Records)
- 2023: Not Very Nice Cream (Hassle Records)

Other releases

- 2017: "Victorian Dolls" (single)
- 2018: Goodbye Dinosaur (EP)
- 2019: Playground for Sad Adults (EP)
