= Louder Than Life =

Annual rock music festival in Louisville, Kentucky

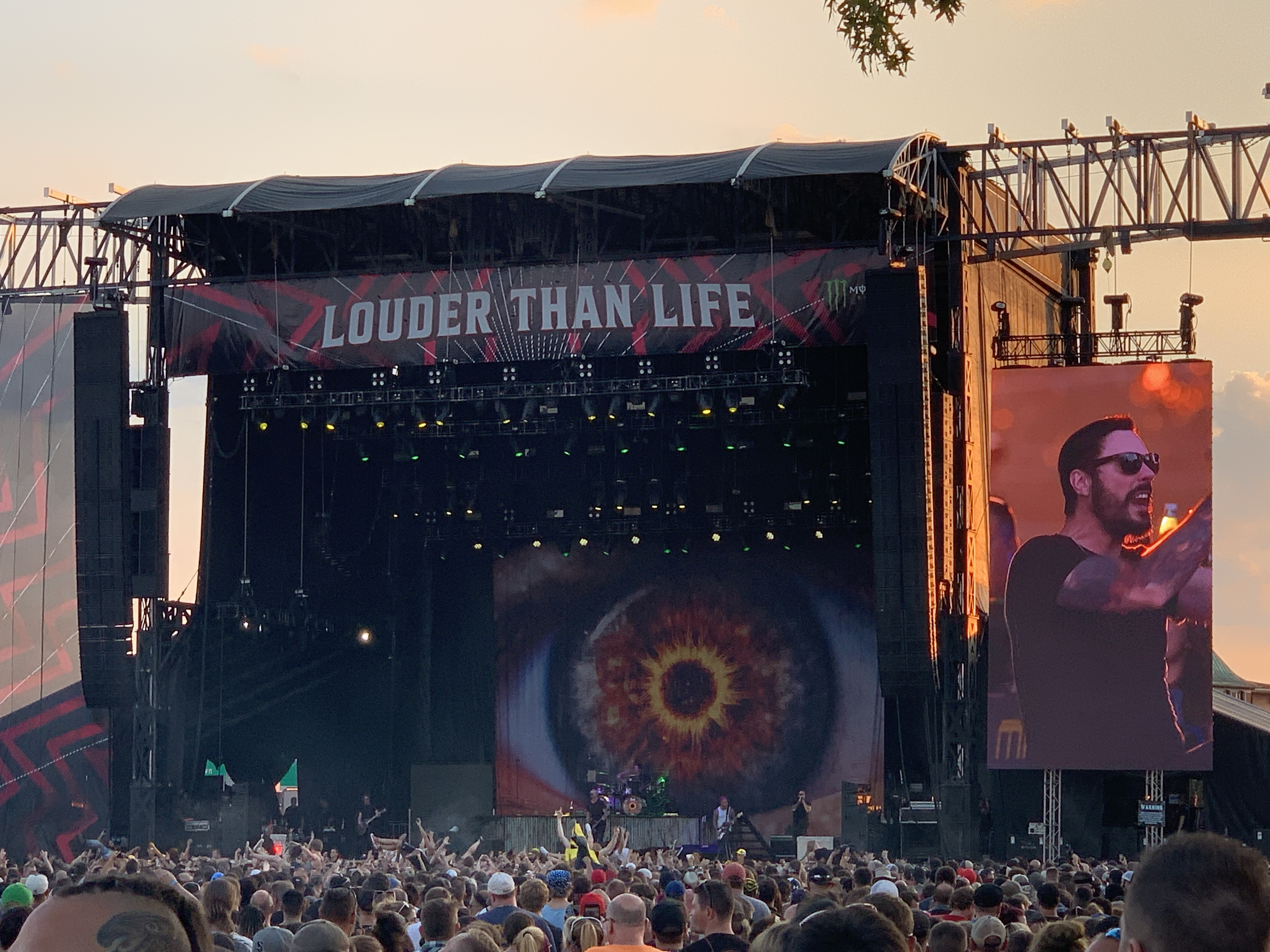
- Breaking Benjamin performing at Louder Than Life 2019
- Genre: Hard rock, heavy metal, punk rock
- Locations: Highland Festival Grounds at the Kentucky Exposition Center, Louisville, Kentucky
- Years active: 2014–present
- Organizer: Danny Wimmer Presents
- Website: louderthanlifefestival.com

Louder Than Life is a rock/heavy metal festival that takes place in Louisville, Kentucky, United States. The event is known to also feature whiskey, craft beer, gourmet food and multiple exhibits. It has made a large economic impact on the city of Louisville.

== History ==
The first Louder Than Life was a two-day festival hosted at Champions Park in 2014.

The 2015 festival also featured live matches between wrestlers from WWE's NXT brand.

In 2018, the festival was expanded to three days, but was canceled due to flooding from severe weather at Champions Park. The following year, the festival moved to Highland Festival Grounds at the Kentucky Exposition Center to prevent flooding.

The 2020 festival was cancelled due to the COVID-19 pandemic.

In 2021 the festival was expanded to four days.

2024 celebrated the 10-year anniversary of the festival with a record 140+ bands, including the reuniting of Slayer after a five-year retirement. However, due to weather conditions caused by Hurricane Helene, Louder Than Life canceled their Friday shows, which included Slayer in the line-up. On October 3, Louder Than Life announced that ticket holders for Friday and 4-days will be offered an exclusive invite to see Slayer at the Aftershock Festival on October 10. On October 30, Danny Wimmer Presents announced that Slayer would return for 2025. Friday and 4 day ticket holders for 2024 would also have the option to receive a partial refund or a credit towards 2025 festival passes.

During the second day of Louder Than Life in 2026, a woman from Tennessee was paralyzed from the waist down after a man fell off a tree, landing on her. Knocked Loose, who was performing as the injury happened, donated $8,000 to the woman, and no criminal investigation was launched.

== Estimated yearly attendance ==
- 2014: 36,000
- 2015: 50,000
- 2016: 50,000
- 2017: 60,000
- 2019: 128,000
- 2021: 160,000
- 2022: 170,000
- 2023: 180,000
- 2024: 150,000
- 2025: 240,000
- 2026: 265,000

== Lineups ==
=== 2014 ===
The first edition of Louder Than Life took place on October 4 and 5, 2014 at Champions Park.

Saturday, October 4

Monster Main Stage North

- Judas Priest
- Stone Temple Pilots with Chester Bennington
- Alter Bridge
- Theory of a Deadman
- Pop Evil
- Otherwise

Monster Main Stage South

- Korn
- Limp Bizkit
- Mastodon
- Steel Panther
- Fuel
- Nonpoint

Marshall Headphones Stage

- Of Mice and Men
- Memphis May Fire
- Miss May I
- Thousand Foot Krutch
- Wilson
- Flaw
Sunday, October 5

Monster Main Stage North

- Kid Rock
- Papa Roach
- A Day to Remember
- Buckcherry
- Hellyeah
- Avatar
- Monster Truck

Monster Main Stage South

- Five Finger Death Punch
- Volbeat
- Bring Me the Horizon
- P.O.D.
- Nothing More
- Crobot
- The New Black 7

Marshall Headphones Stage

- Chiodos
- Motionless in White
- Butcher Babies
- Islander

=== 2015 ===
The second edition of Louder Than Life took place on October 3 and 4, 2015 at Champions Park, expanding to four stages alongside professional wrestling matches from WWE's developmental brand NXT.

Saturday, October 3

Monster Main Stage South

- Rob Zombie
- Bring Me the Horizon
- Hollywood Undead
- Beartooth
- Trivium
- Art of Dying

Monster Main Stage North

- Godsmack
- Seether
- Atreyu
- Saint Asonia
- Butcher Babies
- Jelly Roll

Monster Main Stage East

- Chevelle
- Sevendust
- Tremonti
- Starset
- Red Sun Rising
- RavenEye

Jägermeister Mobile Stage

- Issues
- Aranda
- Like a Storm
- Cliver
- Romantic Rebel

WWE NXT

- Tag team match: Colin Cassady & Enzo Amore defeated Chad Gable & Jason Jordan
- NXT Women's Championship: Bayley (c) defeated Alexa Bliss
- Singles match: Samoa Joe defeated Baron Corbin
- Singles match: Bull Dempsey defeated Elias Samson
- Singles match: Apollo Crews defeated Tye Dillinger
- Singles match: Emma defeated Eva Marie
- NXT Tag Team Championship: The Vaudevillains (Aiden English & Simon Gotch) (c) defeated Dash Wilder & Scott Dawson
- NXT Championship: Finn Bálor (c) defeated Tyler Breeze
Sunday, October 4

Monster Main Stage South

- ZZ Top
- Slash featuring Myles Kennedy and the Conspirators
- Black Stone Cherry
- Hinder
- Nothing More
- The Color Morale

Monster Main Stage North

- Shinedown
- Breaking Benjamin
- Collective Soul
- 10 Years
- Tyler Bryant & the Shakedown
- Whiskey Myers

Monster Main Stage East

- Lynyrd Skynyrd
- 3 Doors Down
- Skid Row
- Kentucky Headhunters
- We Are Harlot
- Goodbye June

Jägermeister Mobile Stage

- We Came as Romans
- Turbowolf
- Flaw
- The Glorious Sons
- All Them Witches

WWE NXT

- Singles match: Apollo Crews defeated Elias Samson
- Singles match: Eva Marie defeated Alexa Bliss
- NXT Tag Team Championship: The Vaudevillains (Aiden English & Simon Gotch) (c) defeated Chad Gable & Jason Jordan
- Singles match: Samoa Joe defeated Tyler Breeze
- Tag team match: Colin Cassady & Enzo Amore defeat Dash Wilder & Scott Dawson
- Singles match: Bull Dempsey defeated Tye Dillinger
- NXT Women's Championship: Bayley (c) defeated Emma
- NXT Championship: Finn Bálor (c) defeated Baron Corbin

=== 2016 ===
The third edition of Louder Than Life took place on October 1 and 2, 2016 at Champions Park, reverting back to three stages.

Saturday, October 1

Monster Stage

- Avenged Sevenfold
- The Cult
- Anthrax
- Motionless in White
- I Prevail
- Neck Deep
- Twelve Foot Ninja

Loudmouth Stage

- Slayer
- Pierce the Veil
- Hellyeah
- The Amity Affliction
- Avatar
- Young Guns
- '68

Zorn Stage

- Cheap Trick
- Chevy Metal
- Sick Puppies
- Being As An Ocean
- Dinosaur Pile-Up
- Bishop Gunn
Sunday, October 2

Monster Stage

- Slipknot
- Korn
- Alter Bridge
- Sevendust
- Parkway Drive
- Skindred
- Crobot

Loudmouth Stage

- Disturbed
- Ghost
- Skillet
- Pop Evil
- Trivium
- Adelitas Way

Zorn Stage

- Clutch
- Zakk Sabbath
- Kyng
- Sabaton
- Smashing Satellites
- Them Evils

=== 2017 ===
The fourth edition of Louder Than Life took place on September 30 and October 1, 2016 at Champions Park.

Saturday, September 30

Monster Stage

- Ozzy Osbourne featuring Zakk Wylde
- Rob Zombie
- Halestorm
- Hollywood Undead
- Of Mice and Men
- Sleeping with Sirens
- For We Are Many

Loudmouth Stage

- Five Finger Death Punch
- Mastodon
- Gojira
- Eagles of Death Metal
- Starset
- New Years Day
- Palisades

Zorn Stage

- Steel Panther
- Fire From the Gods
- Through Fire
- Ded
- He Is Legend
Sunday, October 1

Monster Stage

- Prophets of Rage
- Rise Against
- Thrice
- Falling in Reverse
- Beartooth
- Joyous Wolf

Loudmouth Stage

- Incubus
- Stone Sour
- The Pretty Reckless
- Nothing More
- Greta Van Fleet
- Black Map

Zorn Stage

- In This Moment
- Lacuna Coil
- Radkey
- Ocean Grove
- '68
- Biters

=== 2018 (cancelled) ===
Louder Than Life in 2018 was set to take place at Champions Park from September 28 to 30, 2018, expanding to three days. However, the event was cancelled due to flooding caused by severe weather.

~~Friday, September 28~~

Loudmouth Stage

- ~~Alice in Chains~~
- ~~Breaking Benjamin~~
- ~~Seether~~
- ~~Black Stone Cherry~~
- ~~Red Sun Rising~~
- ~~Badflower~~

Monster Stage

- ~~Limp Bizkit~~
- ~~Slash Featuring Myles Kennedy and the Conspirators~~
- ~~Skillet~~
- ~~Underoath~~
- ~~Tremonti~~
- ~~Hyro the Hero~~

Zorn Stage

- ~~Suicidal Tendencies~~
- ~~Turnstile~~
- ~~Jelly Roll~~
- ~~Skyharbor~~
- ~~Islander~~
- ~~True Villains~~
~~Saturday, September 29~~

Loudmouth Stage

- ~~Godsmack~~
- ~~Shinedown~~
- ~~Bullet for My Valentine~~
- ~~Sevendust~~
- ~~From Ashes to New~~
- ~~Cane Hill~~
- ~~The Jacks~~

Monster Stage

- ~~Five Finger Death Punch~~
- ~~Bush~~
- ~~The Vinnie Paul all-star tribute~~
- ~~Pop Evil~~
- ~~Sick Puppies~~
- ~~Awake at Last~~

Zorn Stage

- ~~Body Count~~
- ~~Gwar~~
- ~~Dance Gavin Dance~~
- ~~Bad Omens~~
- ~~Blacktop Mojo~~
- ~~Stone Broken~~
~~Sunday, September 30~~

Loudmouth Stage

- ~~Nine Inch Nails~~
- ~~Primus~~
- ~~Ice Cube~~
- ~~Glassjaw~~
- ~~The Sword~~
- ~~The Breton Sound~~

Monster Stage

- ~~Deftones~~
- ~~Billy Idol~~
- ~~Clutch~~
- ~~Asking Alexandria~~
- ~~Monster Magnet~~

Zorn Stage

- ~~Action Bronson~~
- ~~Yelawolf~~
- ~~Fever 333~~
- ~~The Dose~~
- ~~Anemic Royalty~~

=== 2019 ===
The fifth edition of Louder Than Life took place from September 27 to 29, 2019. The festival was relocated to Highland Festival Grounds in response to flooding concerns. Die Antwood were scheduled to play on Sunday, but were removed after footage from 2012 surfaced online of members Watkin Tudor "Ninja" Jones and Yolandi Visser getting in physical altercation, with Visser saying a homophobic slur.

Friday, September 27

Barrel Stage

- Slipknot
- A Day to Remember
- I Prevail
- Motionless in White
- Wilson

Oak Stage

- Staind
- Chevelle
- Beartooth
- Philip H. Anselmo and the Illegals
- New Years Day
- All Them Witches

Loudmouth Stage

- Gwar
- Frank Carter and the Rattlesnakes
- The Crystal Method
- Crown Lands
- Dead Posey
- Santa Cruz
Saturday, September 28

Barrel Stage

- Guns N' Roses
- Ice Cube
- Dropkick Murphys
- Suicidal Tendencies
- Anti-Flag
- Dirty Honey
- Amigo the Devil

Oak Stage

- Godsmack
- Halestorm
- Stone Temple Pilots
- Badflower
- Parlor Mob
- Like a Storm

Loudmouth Stage

- Melvins
- Andrew W.K.
- Knocked Loose
- Redd Kross
- Jelly Roll
- Junkbunny
- The Pink Slips
Sunday, September 29

Barrel Stage

- Disturbed
- Marilyn Manson
- In This Moment
- Demon Hunter
- Ded
- Sick Puppies

Oak Stage

- Rob Zombie
- Breaking Benjamin
- Three Days Grace
- Sum 41
- White Reaper
- Amigo the Devil

Loudmouth Stage

- Deadland Ritual
- Ho99o9
- Angel Dust
- Fire From the Gods
- Anemic Royalty

=== 2020 (cancelled) ===
Louder Than Life in 2020 was set to take place at Highland Festival Grounds from September 17 to 20, 2020, expanding to four days. The event was cancelled in April 2020 due to the COVID-19 pandemic. Metallica were the only announced band set for two nights.

=== 2021 ===
The sixth edition of Louder Than Life took place from September 23 to 26, 2021 at Highland Festival Grounds. Breaking Benjamin were added on September 21, as replacements for Mudvayne, who cancelled their performance due to Chad Gray and some staff members contracting COVID-19. Disturbed replaced Nine Inch Nails for the Saturday headliner spot. Snoop Dogg dropped out of the festival for undisclosed reasons, and was replaced by Falling in Reverse.

Thursday, September 23

Space Zebra Stage

- Staind
- Beartooth
- Wage War
- Escape the Fate
- Another Day Dawns

Loudmouth Stage

- Korn
- Cypress Hill
- Anthrax
- Sevendust
- Avoid

Disruptor Stage

- Knocked Loose
- Memphis May Fire
- Zero 9:36
- Jeris Johnson
- Currents
- Blame My Youth
Friday, September 24

Space Zebra Stage

- Metallica
- Rise Against
- Killswitch Engage
- Avatar
- Cleopatrick
- South of Eden

Loudmouth Stage

- Jane's Addiction
- Gojira
- Starset
- Fever 333
- '68
- Joyous Wolf

Disruptor Stage

- Turnstile
- Dead Sara
- The Violent
- Contracult Collective
- Tallah
Saturday, September 25

Space Zebra Stage

- Disturbed
- Machine Gun Kelly
- Suicidal Tendencies
- Grandson
- Bones UK
- Diamante

Loudmouth Stage

- Falling in Reverse
- Volbeat
- Asking Alexandria
- Ice Nine Kills
- Spiritbox
- Red

Disruptor Stage

- Atreyu
- Code Orange
- Butcher Babies
- Dana Dentata
- UnityTX
- Siiickbrain
- The Messenger Birds
Sunday, September 26

Space Zebra Stage

- Metallica
- Breaking Benjamin
- Pennywise
- The Hu
- Tremonti
- Ayron Jones

Loudmouth Stage

- Judas Priest
- Seether
- Skillet
- Badflower
- Fozzy
- Tempt

Disruptor Stage

- Sabaton
- Every Time I Die
- From Ashes to New
- Teenage Wrist
- Dead Poet Society

=== 2022 ===
The seventh edition of Louder Than Life took place from September 22 to 25, 2022 at Highland Festival Grounds, expanding to five stages.

Thursday, September 22

Space Zebra Stage

- Nine Inch Nails
- Evanescence
- Highly Suspect
- Nothing More
- Dorothy
- Maggie Lindemann

Loudmouth Stage

- Bring Me the Horizon
- Halestorm
- Yungblud
- Spiritbox
- New Years Day
- Plush

Disruptor Stage

- Tenacious D
- Ho99o9
- Giovannie and the Hired Guns
- Lilith Czar
- Mothica
- Eva Under Fire

Revolver Stage

- Ministry
- Apocalyptica
- Royal & the Serpent
- Taipei Houston
- Superbloom
- The Dead Deads

DWP Presents Stage

- Archers
- Nail Bite
- Asava
- Two Sides of Me
- Magg Dylan
Friday, September 23

Space Zebra Stage

- Slipknot
- Lamb of God
- In This Moment
- In Flames
- Ded
- Vended

Loudmouth Stage

- Shinedown
- Mastodon
- Clutch
- Amigo the Devil
- All Good Things
- Ego Kill Talent

Disruptor Stage

- Meshuggah
- Baroness
- Crown the Empire
- Mike's Dead
- Archetypes Collide
- Aeir

Revolver Stage

- Gwar
- Helmet
- Suicide Silence
- Poorstacy
- Orbit Culture
- The Luka State

DWP Presents Stage

- Until I Wake
- Befell
- Young Other
- The Dev
- The 500 Block
Saturday, September 24

Space Zebra Stage

- Kiss
- Alice Cooper
- Ghostemane
- Sevendust
- Tetrarch
- Redlight King

Loudmouth Stage

- Rob Zombie
- Chevelle
- Jerry Cantrell
- Pop Evil
- Airbourne
- Solence

Disruptor Stage

- Body Count
- Ill Nino
- Cherry Bombs
- Wargasm
- The Alive
- Dropout Kings

Revolver Stage

- Theory of a Deadman
- We Came as Romans
- D.R.U.G.S.
- Trash Boat
- Bloodywood

DWP Presents Stage

- Widow7
- Silly Goose
- Sevven
- Scarlet O'Hara
- Breed
Sunday, September 25

Space Zebra Stage

- Red Hot Chili Peppers
- Incubus
- The Pretty Reckless
- The Struts
- Dirty Honey
- Radkey

Loudmouth Stage

- Alice in Chains
- Papa Roach
- Jelly Roll
- The Joy Formidable
- The Warning
- The Strangers

Disruptor Stage

- Action Bronson
- Bayside
- Joey Valence & Brae
- Carolesdaughter
- The Native Howl

Revolver Stage

- Bad Religion
- Anti-Flag
- Oxymorrons
- Crown Lands
- Shaman's Harvest

DWP Presents Stage

- Lines of Loyalty
- Rivals
- As You Were
- Heartsick
- Normundy

=== 2023 ===
The eighth edition of Louder Than Life took place from September 21 to 24, 2023 at Highland Festival Grounds.

Thursday, September 21

Loudmouth Stage

- Foo Fighters
- Rancid
- Coheed and Cambria
- White Reaper
- Mannequin Pussy
- Pinkshift

Space Zebra Stage

- Weezer
- 311
- Royal Blood
- Nothing But Thieves
- Call Me Karizma
- Tigercub

Disruptor Stage

- Code Orange
- L7
- Sueco
- Starcrawler
- Guerrilla Warfare
- Asava

Revolver Stage

- Deafheaven
- Nothing,Nowhere
- Beauty School Dropout
- Kid Kapichi
- Kyng
- Starbenders

Road Hounds Stage

- Movements
- SeeYouSpaceCowboy
- Nail Bite
- Traverse the Abyss
- Nvrless
- From Ashes to Embers

Kroger Big Bourbon Bar

- Oliver Anthony
Friday, September 22

Loudmouth Stage

- Godsmack
- Megadeth
- Bad Omens
- Avatar
- Wargasm
- Flat Black

Space Zebra Stage

- Tool
- Limp Bizkit
- Corey Taylor
- Wage War
- Fame on Fire
- Austin Meade

Disruptor Stage

- Dance Gavin Dance
- Kittie
- Ten56.
- SiM
- Gnome
- Fox Lake

Revolver Stage

- Fever 333
- Miss May I
- Tallah
- Hanabie
- Widow7
- Luna Aura

Road Hounds Stage

- Enter Shikari
- Raven Gray
- Foxbat
- Capra
- Major Moment

Kroger Big Bourbon Bar

- Oliver Anthony
Saturday, September 23

Loudmouth Stage

- Avenged Sevenfold
- Falling in Reverse
- Parkway Drive
- Asking Alexandria
- Memphis May Fire
- Strange Kids

Space Zebra Stage

- Pantera
- Pierce the Veil
- Babymetal
- The Hu
- Suicide Silence
- Another Day Dawns

Disruptor Stage

- The Amity Affliction
- Dethklok
- Gideon
- Afterlife
- Ithaca
- Reach NYC
- Dissonation

Revolver Stage

- Sleep Token
- Whitechapel
- Zero 9:36
- Kim Dracula
- Dragged Under
- Devil's Cut

Road Hounds Stage

- Jesus Piece
- Feast For the Crows
- Silly Goose
- Kissing Candice
- Deadlands
- CZYK
- Dead//Water
Sunday, September 24

Loudmouth Stage

- Queens of the Stone Age
- Run the Jewels
- Flogging Molly
- Awolnation
- Senses Fail
- Thousand Below

Space Zebra Stage

- Green Day
- Turnstile
- The Interrupters
- Rival Sons
- Boston Manor
- Holy Wars

Disruptor Stage

- Mayday Parade
- Viagra Boys
- Rain City Drive
- Sleep Theory
- Letdown.
- As You Were

Revolver Stage

- Billy Talent
- DeathbyRomy
- Jehnny Beth
- The Bronx
- Reddstar
- Death Valley Dreams

Roadhounds Stage

- The Emo Night Tour
- JVK
- Archers
- HXLA
- Two Sides of Me

=== 2024 ===
The ninth edition of Louder Than Life took place on September 26, 28 and 29, 2024 at Highland Festival Grounds. The second day of Louder Than Life was canceled due to severe weather caused by Hurricane Helene. Various artists who were scheduled to play Friday played pop up shows at local bars and clubs around Louisville. 2024 also scheduled bands to play post festival shows at the fifteenTwelve club. Falling in Reverse was scheduled to play on Saturday, but pulled out due to travel delays. Till Lindemann, who was scheduled to play Friday, took their place.

Thursday, September 26

Main Stage 1

- Slipknot
- The Offspring
- Seether
- Badflower
- Fit For A King
- Point North
- Dead Poet Society

Main Stage 2

- Five Finger Death Punch
- Halestorm
- Highly Suspect
- Starset
- The Warning
- Finger Eleven
- Reach NYC

Decibel Stage

- Sum 41
- Marky Ramone
- Bob Vylan
- Brutus
- Touché Amoré
- Orgy
- Teen Mortgage

Reverb Stage

- Saosin
- PUP
- Militarie Gun
- Holding Absence
- Slothrust
- Mike's Dead
- Soulglo

Loudmouth Stage

- Destroy Rebuild Until God Shows
- Veil of Maya
- Kneecap
- Blame My Youth
- Deadlands
- Budderside
- Jigsaw Youth
~~Friday, September 27~~

Main Stage 1

- ~~Slayer~~
- ~~Till Lindemann~~
- ~~Anthrax~~
- ~~Sevendust~~
- ~~Black Stone Cherry~~
- ~~Nonpoint~~
- ~~New Years Day~~

Main Stage 2

- ~~Evanescence~~
- ~~In This Moment~~
- ~~Clutch~~
- ~~Fozzy~~
- ~~From Ashes to New~~
- ~~Alien Ant Farm~~
- ~~Like a Storm~~

Decibel Stage

- ~~Tom Morello~~
- ~~Grandson~~
- ~~Show Me the Body~~
- ~~Set It Off~~
- ~~The Chisel~~
- ~~Powerman 5000~~
- ~~Adema~~

Reverb Stage

- ~~Lorna Shore~~
- ~~Fugitive~~
- ~~Whitechapel~~
- ~~Holy Fawn~~
- ~~Gel~~
- ~~Return to Dust~~
- ~~Silly Goose~~

Loudmouth Stage

- ~~Juliette and the Licks~~
- ~~Ho99o9~~
- ~~High Vis~~
- ~~Ekho~~
- ~~Caskets~~
- ~~Jager Henry~~
Saturday, September 28

Main Stage 1

- Mötley Crüe
- Till Lindemann
- Dropkick Murphys
- Nothing More
- Filter
- Tim Montana
- CKY

Main Stage 2

- Disturbed
- Chevelle
- Skillet
- Sleeping with Sirens
- P.O.D.
- Lilith Czar
- Local H

Decibel Stage

- Mastodon
- L.S. Dunes
- Joey Valence & Brae
- The Armed
- Tantric
- UnityTX

Reverb Stage

- Body Count
- Three 6 Mafia
- Better Lovers
- Citizen Soldier
- Any Given Sin
- Damnage

Loudmouth Stage

- Health
- Ill Niño
- The Funeral Portrait
- Lø Spirit
- Hemorage
- Dying Oath
Sunday, September 29

Main Stage 1

- Korn
- Breaking Benjamin
- Gojira
- Spiritbox
- Eagles of Death Metal
- Oxymorrons
- Hed PE

Main Stage 2

- Judas Priest
- Staind
- Architects
- Poppy
- Saliva
- Drowning Pool
- Taproot

Decibel Stage

- Jinjer
- Polaris
- Drug Church
- Winona Fighter
- Royale Lynn
- Project MishraM
- As You Were

Reverb Stage

- Biohazard
- Pain of Truth
- Narrow Head
- Descartes A Kant
- Silent Planet

Loudmouth Stage

- Sponge
- Red
- Nerv
- Black Map
- Self Deception
- Gozu

=== 2025 ===
The tenth edition of Louder Than Life took place from September 18 to 21, 2025 at Highland Festival Grounds, and expanded to seven stages. Due to severe weather on the fourth day, 12 Stones, Yngwie Malmsteen, Chained Saint, and Gates To Hell were forced to cancel their performances.

Thursday, September 18

Main Stage 1

- Slayer
- Lamb of God
- Down
- Cavalera
- Carcass
- Municipal Waste
- Winds of Plague

Main Stage 2

- Rob Zombie
- Marilyn Manson
- Cannibal Corpse
- Exodus
- The Black Dahlia Murder
- Fear Factory
- Fulci

Decibal Stage

- Lorna Shore
- Kublai Khan TX
- Brand of Sacrifice
- Sanguisugabogg
- Full of Hell
- Left to Suffer
- Not Enough Space

Reverb Stage

- The Story So Far
- Neck Deep
- State Champs
- Drain
- Four Year Strong
- Gideon
- Guilt Trip

Loudmouth Stage

- From Ashes to New
- Atreyu
- Set It Off
- Catch Your Breath
- Landmvrks
- Colorblind
- If Not For Me

Big Bourbon Bar

- PeelingFlesh
- Mugshot
- Snuffed on Sight
- Big Ass Truck
- Imperial Tide
- Sicksense

Kingdom Stage

- XweaponX
- Haywire 617
- Silly Goose
Friday, September 19

Main Stage 1

- Avenged Sevenfold
- Breaking Benjamin
- Mudvayne
- Insane Clown Posse
- Static-X
- Dope
- Nonpoint
- Seven Hours After Violet

Main Stage 2

- Sleep Token
- Spiritbox
- Dayseeker
- Pvris
- Imminence
- Northlane
- Violent Vira

Decibel Stage

- All Time Low
- Hollywood Undead
- Story of the Year
- Of Mice & Men
- Magnolia Park
- Hot Milk

Reverb Stage

- Dream Theater
- Powerwolf
- DragonForce
- Alestorm
- Demon Hunter
- Gloryhammer
- Liliac

Loudmouth Stage

- Hatebreed
- Whitechapel
- Suicide Silence
- Miss May I
- Thrown
- Walls of Jericho
- Thornhill

Big Bourbon Bar

- Ded
- Islander
- Aurorawave
- Savage Hands
- Uncured
- X-Comm

Kingdom Stage

- Unearth
- War of Ages
- Convictions
- Upon a Burning Body
Saturday, September 20

Main Stage 1

- Deftones
- A Perfect Circle
- Stone Temple Pilots
- Acid Bath
- Failure
- Superheaven
- Quannnic

Main Stage 2

- Bad Omens
- I Prevail
- Motionless in White
- Black Veil Brides
- Fleshwater
- The Funeral Portrait
- Silent Theory

Decibel Stage

- Trivium
- Machine Head
- Chimaira
- August Burns Red
- DevilDriver
- SpiritWorld
- Disembodied Tyrant

Reverb Stage

- Cypress Hill
- Stabbing Westward
- Kittie
- Spineshank
- Snot
- The Union Underground
- Ra

Loudmouth Stage

- Chiodos
- Letlive
- Blessthefall
- Hawthorne Heights
- From First to Last
- Attack Attack!
- Woe, Is Me

Big Bourbon Bar

- Small Town Titans
- Smile Empty Soul
- Halocene
- Ashes Remain
- Versus Me
- Left For Last

Kingdom Stage

- Fight From Within
- The Browning
- Upon a Burning Body
Sunday, September 21

Main Stage 1

- Bring Me the Horizon
- Evanescence
- Knocked Loose
- Slaughter to Prevail
- Tech N9ne
- The Plot in You
- Escape the Fate

Main Stage 2

- $uicideboy$
- Three Days Grace
- Wage War
- We Came as Romans
- Memphis May Fire
- Crown the Empire
- Sleep Theory

Decibel Stage

- In This Moment
- Flyleaf with Lacey Sturm
- Hinder
- Crossfade
- 10 Years
- Rev Theory
- ~~12 Stones~~

Reverb Stage

- Bruce Dickinson
- Testament
- Queensrÿche
- Sebastian Bach
- Accept
- ~~Yngwie Malmsteen~~
- ~~Chained Saint~~

Loudmouth Stage

- The Dillinger Escape Plan
- Glassjaw
- Counterparts
- Dying Wish
- Norma Jean
- It Dies Today
- ~~Gates To Hell~~

Big Bourbon Bar

- Wargasm
- Amira Elfeky
- The Haunt
- Kami Kehoe
- Picturesque
- Enmy

Kingdom Stage

- 156/Silence
- Orthodox
- Fox Lake
- Return to Dust

=== 2026 ===
The eleventh edition of Louder Than Life took place from September 17 to 20, 2026. The second day of Louder Than Life was paused and evacuated by 3 PM EDT due to severe weather. The event resumed at 6 PM with updated set times. Papa Roach was scheduled to perform on Saturday, but pulled out due to bassist Tobin Esperance experiencing a sudden medical emergency.

Thursday, September 17

Louder Stage

- Iron Maiden
- Megadeth
- Alice Cooper
- Anthrax
- Suicidal Tendencies
- Metal Church
- The Violent Hour

Life Stage

- Pantera
- Danzig
- Sabaton
- Machine Head
- Gwar
- Mac Sabbath
- Chained Saint

Decibel Stage

- Rise Against
- Jimmy Eat World
- Hot Mulligan
- Alkaline Trio
- Bowling for Soup
- Lit
- The Ataris

Reverb Stage

- Skillet
- Starset
- From Ashes to New
- Red
- The Rasmus
- Adelitas Way
- Zero 9:36

Loudmouth Stage

- Fit for a King
- Currents
- After The Burial
- The Acacia Strain
- Emmure
- Born of Osiris
- Signs of the Swarm

Impact Stage

- Chelsea Grin
- Erra
- Volumes
- Like Moths To Flames
- Cane Hill
- Vianova
- King 810

Big Bourbon Bar

- Thousand Below
- Archers
- Elijah
- Dark Divine
- Holy Wars
- Sent by Ravens
- Set For Tomorrow
Friday, September 18

Louder Stage

- My Chemical Romance
- A Day to Remember
- Taking Back Sunday
- Coheed and Cambria
- We the Kings
- L.S. Dunes
- The Red Jumpsuit Apparatus

Life Stage

- Pierce the Veil
- The Used
- Sleeping with Sirens
- Loathe
- Get Scared
- Lacey Sturm
- Ivri

Decibel Stage

- The Pretty Reckless
- The Warning
- Dead Poet Society
- Scene Queen
- Vana
- Showing Teeth
- American Monster

Reverb Stage

- Chad Gray
- Cavalera Conspiracy
- Blue Medusa ft. Alissa White-Gluz
- Soulfly
- Mushroomhead
- Butcher Babies
- Death Valley Dreams

Loudmouth Stage

- President
- Holding Absence
- The Word Alive
- Rain City Drive
- Wind Walkers
- Nevertel

Impact Stage

- Knocked Loose
- Haywire
- Angel Du$t
- Twitching Tongues
- Koyo
- Missing Link
- Gates to Hell

Big Bourbon Bar

- Soil
- Jeff Hardy
- Dry Kill Logic
- Primer 55
- Earshot
- 40 Below Summer
- Billy McNicol
Saturday, September 19

Louder Stage

- Limp Bizkit
- Sublime
- Bilmuri
- Tom Morello
- P.O.D.
- Alien Ant Farm
- Josey Scott

Life Stage

- ~~Papa Roach~~
- Babymetal
- Ice Nine Kills
- Nothing More
- Set It Off
- The Funeral Portrait
- TX2

Decibel Stage

- Halestorm
- In This Moment
- Lindsey Stirling
- Orianthi
- Icon For Hire
- Kami Kehoe
- Diamante

Reverb Stage

- Circa Survive
- Dance Gavin Dance
- Chiodos
- Thursday
- Hail the Sun
- Scary Kids Scaring Kids
- Emarosa

Loudmouth Stage

- Kublai Khan TX
- Boundaries
- Spite
- PeelingFlesh
- Fox Lake
- Silly Goose
- Heavy//Hitter
- Freeze the Fall

Impact Stage

- Blood for Blood
- Agnostic Front
- Madball
- H2O
- The Barbarians of California
- Many Eyes
- Codefendants

Big Bourbon Bar

- Powerman 5000
- Texas Hippie Coalition
- Tantric
- Otherwise
- Spoken
- No Resolve
- Doobie
- As You Were
Sunday, September 20

Louder Stage

- Tool
- Danny Elfman
- The Mars Volta
- Ministry
- Filter
- Toadies

Life Stage

- Gojira
- Mastodon
- Black Label Society
- Dethklok
- Animals as Leaders
- Between the Buried and Me
- Rivers of Nihil

Decibel Stage

- The Prodigy
- Killswitch Engage
- Black Veil Brides
- Atreyu
- Escape the Fate
- I See Stars
- Caskets
- Austin Carlile

Reverb Stage

- Underoath
- Thrice
- Alexisonfire
- Haste the Day
- Emery
- Maylene and the Sons of Disaster
- He Is Legend

Loudmouth Stage

- Sleep Theory
- The Home Team
- Jutes
- Holywatr
- Arrows In Action
- The Pretty Wild
- Sace6

Impact Stage

- Sunami
- Locked Shut
- End It
- 200 Stab Wounds
- Corpse Pile
- Boltcutter
- Resolve

Big Bourbon Bar

- 156/Silence
- Greyhaven
- Aviana
- Downswing
- Resolve
- Dreamwake
- Future Palace
