= Liliac =

Liliac may refer to

- Liliac (band), an American heavy metal band
- Liliac, a village in the commune of Bahna, Romania
