= Ekho =

Ekho may refer to:

- Ekho (mythology), a nymph in Greek mythology
- Ekho (band), an Israeli metal band
- Ekho Moskvy, a Russian radio station
- Ekho Mountain, in Antarctica

== See also ==
- Echo (disambiguation)
