= Dr. Ed and the Flu Shots =

US musical group

Dr. Ed and Friends
- Origin: Illinois, United States
- Genres: Psychedelic Rock Reggae Funk
- Years active: 2003–present
- Label: Duckphone Records
- Members: Eddie Kulack; Nick Cardelli; Brian Roberts; Luke Lleras; Drew Settipani; Nick Bush; Drew Steury; Noe Perez; Devon Bates

Dr. Ed and Friends (formerly Dr. Ed and the Flu Shots), is a nine-piece reggae influenced funk/rock band from the Chicago area. This band has been together since 2004 and has experienced transitions from its ska-punk beginnings to the funk rhythms and heavy rock jams that cultivate its progression.

Doctor Ed was influenced by Galactic, The Derek Trucks Band, Lettuce, Sly & the Family Stone, Thievery Corporation, Medeski Scofield Martin and Wood, Curtis Mayfield, Sublime, and Pink Floyd.

As Dr. Ed and the Flu Shots, they have opened for touring bands like Big D & the Kids Table, Mad Conductor, Synthetic Elements, Evil Empire, Suburban Legends, Patent Pending, MSC, Knock Out, Fatter Than Albert, One Night Band, The Expos, and Voodoo Glow Skulls.

== Members ==
- Eddie Kulack — Vocals
- Nick Cardelli — Guitar
- Noe Perez — Guitar
- Brian Roberts — Bass
- Luke Lleras — Drums
- Drew Settipani — Trumpet
- Devon Bates; Percussion
- Nick Bush — Alto Saxophone
- Drew Steury — Trombone

== Frequent guest ==
- Maxx McGathey — Keyboard

== Discography ==
=== Albums ===
- Kool-Aid Kids vs Dr. Ed and the Flu Shots (2006)
- The Loyal Opposition
- "Friendzy!" (2010)
