= Kingdom of Giants =

American metalcore band

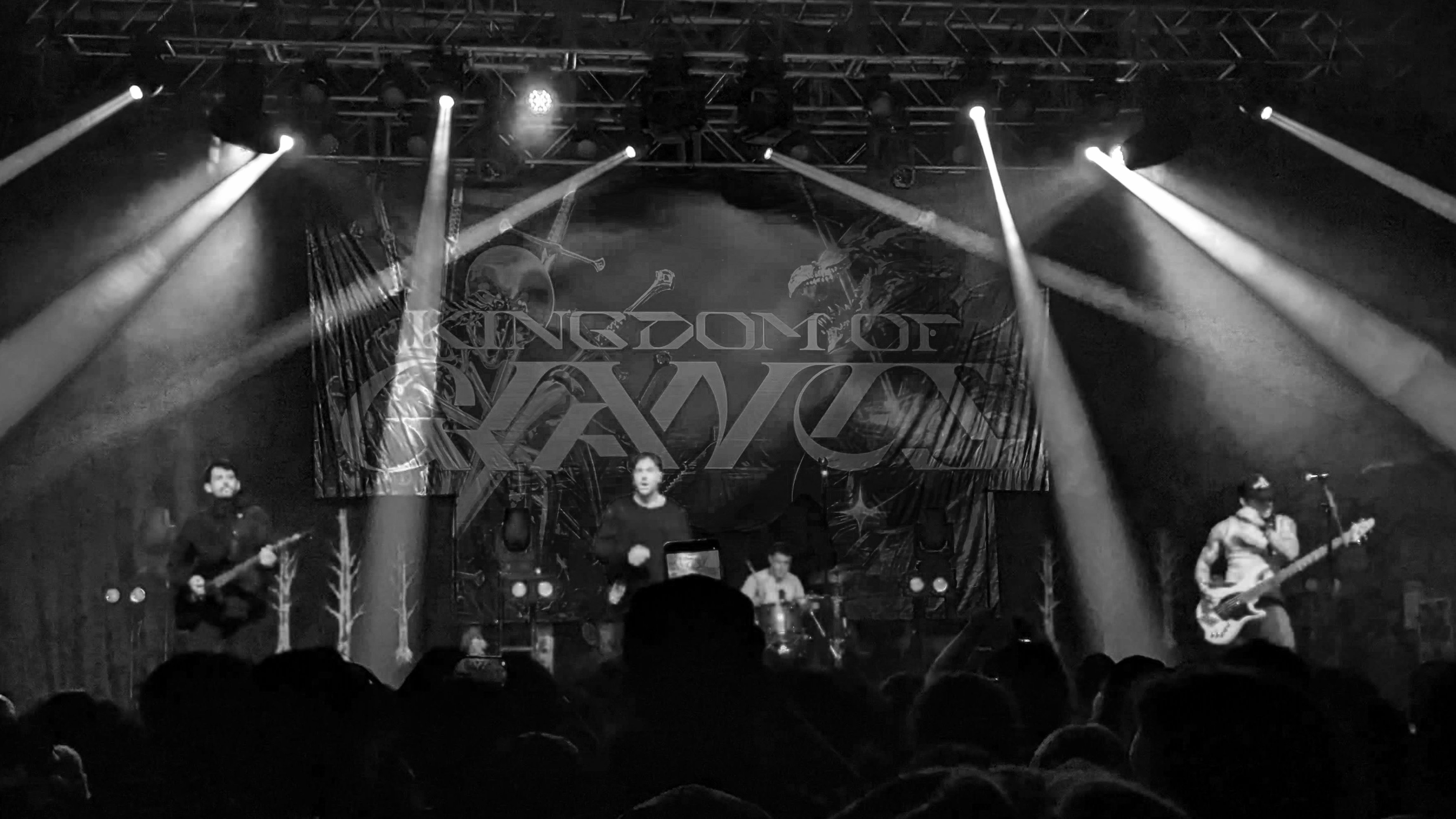
- Kingdom of Giants performing in Anaheim, CA in 2026

Background information
- Origin: Sacramento, California, U.S.
- Genres: Metalcore; post-hardcore; alternative metal
- Years active: 2010–present
- Labels: InVogue; SharpTone
- Members: Dana Willax; Red Martin; Max Bremer; Julian Perez; JT Gutierrez; Truman Berlin
- Past members: Stephen Rezza; Matt Harwell; Matt Mavroudis; Levi Norris; Jonathan Reeves
- Website: Kingdom of Giants on Facebook

Kingdom of Giants is an American metalcore band from Sacramento, California. It was formed in 2010 from the remnants of other bands by Julian Perez, Max Bremer, Levi Norris, Dana Willax, Red Martin, and Stephen Rezza.

== History ==
After releasing Abominable in 2011, the EP gained them serious Buzz even landing in Alternative Press's AP&R the publications unsigned artist column and shortly following an album titled Every Wave of Sound ft. the song "MJ Returns" being the last of Stephen Rezza's on-album/band Contributions as well as the final song on Every Wave. The band toured the United States with Dayseeker, and signed with InVogue Records in 2014. That same year they acquired Truman Berlin on drums, they released their second album titled Ground Culture, along with the music video for "Endure" with Ricky Armellino as the featured artist.

In May 2017, Kingdom of Giants released their third album, All the Hell You've Got to Spare, and toured the US and Europe. Before 2020, the band signed a record deal with SharpTone Records, marking a significant milestone in their career as well as gaining much needed clean vocal power in Jonny Reeves. Their fourth full-length album, Passenger, was released on October 16, 2020, through their new label.

Throughout August until the start of September in 2023, Kingdom of Giants went on the Hollow Bodies 10 Year Anniversary Tour in the US headlined by blessthefall alongside Caskets and Dragged Under.

In January 2024, Kingdom of Giants joined with We Came as Romans on a tour in the United Kingdom headlined by British band Bury Tomorrow. In September of the same year, Kingdom of Giants released their second EP titled Bleeding Star consisting of six tracks. During that time, they went on the Dark Sun Protocol Tour with Catch Your Breath and Alpha Wolf headlined by Dayseeker. On May 29, 2025, after touring with The Amity Affliction as a replacement for Ahren Stringer, former bassist/vocalist Jonny Reeves was announced to join the band full-time. Kingdom of Giants were the opening act along with TX2 and Dark Divine, for the Summer of Loud 2025 tour, in which they performed from July 5 to July 15 headlined by Parkway Drive, Killswitch Engage, Beartooth, and I Prevail, with other acts consisting of The Amity Affliction, The Devil Wears Prada, and Alpha Wolf.

== Band members ==
=== Current ===
- Dana Willax – lead vocals (2010–present)
- Max Bremer – lead guitar (2010–present)
- Julian Perez – rhythm guitar (2015–present)
- JT Gutierrez – bass, clean vocals (2026–present)
- Truman Berlin – drums (2011–2012, 2016–present)

=== Former ===
- Matt Harwell – drums (2010–2011)
- Red Martin - guitar (2010-2025)
- Stephen Rezza – clean vocals, keyboards (2010–2012)
- Matt Mavroudis – drums (2012–2016)
- Levi Norris – bass, clean vocals (2010–2016)
- Jonny Reeves – bass, clean vocals (2016–2023, 2024–2025)

== Discography ==
Albums

- Every Wave of Sound (2013, Self-released)
- Ground Culture (2014, InVogue)
- All the Hell You've Got to Spare (2017, InVogue)
- Passenger (2020, SharpTone)
- Usurper (2026, SharpTone)

EPs

- Abominable (2011, Self-released)
- Bleeding Star (2024, SharpTone)
- Burning Chrome (2025, SharpTone)

Singles

- "MJ Returns" (2011, Self-released)
- "Griever" (2013, Self-released)
- "Broken Ocean" (2013, Self-released)
- "Ground Culture" (2014, InVogue)
- "Endure" (feat. Ricky Armellino) (2014, InVogue)
- "Motif" (2015, InVogue)
- "Damaged Goods" (2017, InVogue)
- "Runaway" (2017, InVogue)
- "Tunnel Vision" (feat. J.T. Cavey) (2017, InVogue)
- "No Faith No Space" (2018, InVogue)
- "Bleach" (2019, SharpTone)
- "Sync" (2020, SharpTone)
- "Side Effect" (2020, SharpTone)
- "Wayfinder" (2020, SharpTone)
- "Blue Dream" (feat. Michael Barr) (2020, SharpTone)
- "Wasted Space" (2023, SharpTone)
- "Asphalt" (2024, SharpTone)
- "Bloodworm" (2024, SharpTone)
- "Collide" (2025, SharpTone)
- "Digital Hell" (2025, SharpTone)
- "Respawn" (2026, SharpTone)
