= Major Moment =

American alternative metal musical ensemble

- Origin: Boston, Massachusetts, U.S.
- Genres: Alternative metal; Hard rock
- Years active: 2018–present
- Label: Independent
- Members: Andrey Borzykin; Sasha Razumova
- Past members: Daniel Interrante; Gabriel De Mattia De Oliveira; Adam Soucy; Mike Lipson; Colten Phillips; John Williams; Steve Matin
- Website: majormomentband.com

Major Moment is an American alternative metal band from Boston, Massachusetts formed in 2018.

== History ==
Major Moment was formed in 2018. In 2021, the band performed at Blue Ridge Rock Festival, and at Louder Than Life in 2023.

On 24 October 2024, the ensemble performed at Taffeta Music Hall in Lowell, Massachusetts with American rock band Silent Theory.

Between May and July 2025, the group toured Washington, DC and the Northeastern United States, including a May 20 performance with Finnish rock band The Rasmus.

On 20 June 2025, the band released The Pain that Makes Us Grow, their debut full length album.

In September and October of 2025, the ensemble will perform in the Eastern United States with American rock bands Ovtlier and Silent Theory.

In August and September of 2026, Major Moment toured the Eastern United States with American rock band Plush.

== Critical reception ==
Sofar Sounds stated that their extended play album one small stEP "puts its kinetic, intelligent tracks on display and shows that Major Moment has the power to reach a global audience".

Anita Stewart, Managing Editor for Rock at Night said that "Their music is intense, with a huge wall of sound from layered synths, dramatic guitar and beautiful harmonies" going on to profess that "The band’s previous stand-out single “The Flood” received a lot of attention and critical acclaim acquiring millions of streams and awards for songwriting and the music" and that "They were recently nominated for Best Rock Band at 2020’s Boston Music Awards".

Tony Shrum of New Noise Magazine indicated that the ensemble "quickly developed a diverse and kinetic sound that integrates heavy guitar riffs, multi-layered synths and melodic vocal blends".

Outburn magazine verbiated that the group "has developed an intense and diverse cinematic rock soundscape that integrates heavy guitar riffs, multi-layered synths, and melodic vocals".

== Members ==
- Andrey Borzykin – vocals (2018–present)
- Sasha Razumova – vocals (2018–present)

=== Former ===
- Gabriel De Mattia De Oliveira – lead guitar (2018)
- Adam Soucy – drums (2018–2019)
- Mike Lipson – bass (2024)
- Colten Phillips – guitar (2023–2024)
- John Williams – guitar (2024–2025)
- Steve Matin – drums (2024–2026)

== Discography ==
=== Studio albums ===
- The Pain That Makes Us Grow (2025)
- IN LOVE & WAR (2026)

=== EPs ===
- one small stEP (2018)
- The Sequel (2019)

=== Remix albums ===
- The Flood: Remixed & Reimagined (2021)

=== Live albums ===
- Live In Danville (2022)
- Live at Revelry Studios, Vol.1 (2023)

=== Music videos ===
Title	Year	Album	Directors	Link
"Leave Out All The Rest"	2018	Non-album single	Ben Proulx	
"May Leave Scars"	2019	The Sequel EP	Tyler Ayers	
"The Flood"	2020	The Pain That Makes Us Grow	Tyler Ayers & Andrey Borzykin	
"После Нас Потоп"	2021	Non-album single	Tyler Ayers & Andrey Borzykin	
"Dead"	2021	The Pain That Makes Us Grow	Tyler Ayers	
"The Flood: Epilogue (Reimagined)"	2021	Non-album single	Tyler Ayers & Andrey Borzykin	
"Toxic"	2023	The Pain That Makes Us Grow	Ian Urquhart & Andrey Borzykin	
"Overcome"	2023	The Pain That Makes Us Grow	Incognito	
"Losing Battles"	2023	The Pain That Makes Us Grow	Justin Sulham	
"Victim"	2024	The Pain That Makes Us Grow	Vlad Tipicidi & Andrey Borzykin	
"Victim (NYC Version)"	2024	The Pain That Makes Us Grow	Vlad Tipicidi & Andrey Borzykin	
"Staged"	2024	The Pain That Makes Us Grow	Incognito	
"What A Time"	TBR	The Pain That Makes Us Grow	Evan Middleton & Andrey Borzykin	
"Voices"	TBR	The Pain That Makes Us Grow	Andrey Borzykin & Sasha Razumova	
"Married"	2025	The Pain That Makes Us Grow	Cameron Burns & Andrey Borzykin	
"Promises"	2025	In Love & War	Alex Kouvatsos & Andrey Borzykin	
"Not That Broken"	2026	In Love & War	Alex Kouvatsos & Andrey Borzykin	
