= Honey Revenge =

American pop rock and pop-punk band

- Honey Revenge at The Broadberry in Richmond, VA

Background information
- Origin: Los Angeles, California
- Genre: Pop rock, Pop-punk
- Years active: 2021–present
- Label: Thriller Records
- Members: Devin Papadol; Donny Lloyd
- Website: honeyrevenge.com

Honey Revenge is an American pop rock and pop-punk band formed in Los Angeles in 2021. Comprising lead vocalist Devin Papadol and guitarist Donny Lloyd, the band formed after Lloyd joined a five-piece band Papadol was in and continued working together after the other three members left. They released their debut album, Retrovision, in June 2023. They have frequently cited You Me at Six, Paramore, Hannah Montana, and Demi Lovato as influences.

== History ==
Devin Papadol formed a band called Forever Emerald while studying at Musicians Institute in Hollywood, Los Angeles. The band achieved minor local success, with one video, of the band performing at a skate shop, going viral. One of the video's viewers was Donny Lloyd, who at the time was a member of the band Youngdriver, had just graduated from high school and was about to move to Los Angeles from Georgia. They (Note: Lloyd is non-binary and uses singular they pronouns.) contacted Papadol's band, asking about opportunities for guitarists in Los Angeles. Learning that Papadol's band had a vacancy, Lloyd sent an audition video and joined the group. The remainder of the five-member band broke apart during the COVID-19 pandemic, leaving Lloyd and Papadol to form the musical duo Honey Revenge. The duo had considered names for the band over six months; Papadol has stated that she wanted it to be "sweet and cutesy" but "rigid and rock" to encapsulate their pop rock aesthetic.

In 2021, Papadol and Lloyd released their debut single, "Miss Me", which had been initially written by Papadol while in her previous band three and a half years earlier and featured a voicemail from the song's subject. At the time, the band wanted to make sure they had a collection of songs ready before releasing anything. In June 2022, the band released "Distracted" alongside a music video. By August, they had signed to Thriller Records; that month, they released "Ride", a track written about experiencing good things after low periods. That November, they released "Rerun", a track written about Papadol's pandemic experience of unhappily living the same day repeatedly. In February 2023, the band released "Are You Impressed?", a track written about the stresses of the internet, alongside a music video. The following month, they announced their debut album Retrovision, and released "Airhead", Papadol's take on her own impulsive thinking.

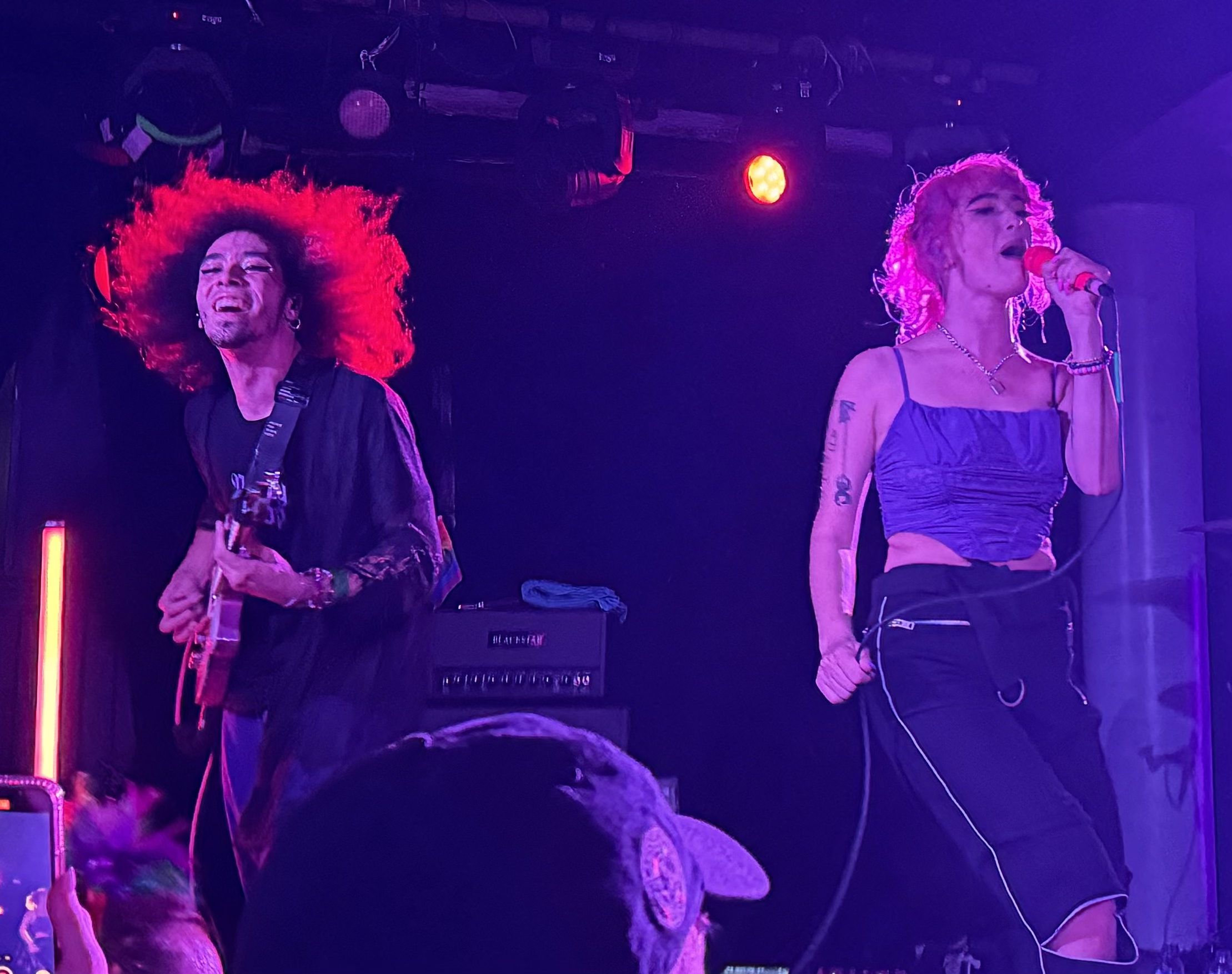
Honey Revenge performing in London, 2024

In April 2023, the band released a further Retrovision single, "Worst Apology", a track written about empowering oneself against victim blaming. A further single, "Favorite Song", was released from the same album that May and was written about the frustrations of being texted intermittently. In June 2023, the pair released Retrovision, which received positive reviews from Kerrang! and Distorted Sound Magazine, and which included "Distracted", "Rerun", "Are You Impressed?", "Worst Apology", "Favourite Song", and "Habitual", the last of which a music video was released for. In May 2024, they released "Recipe For Disaster", which had been written on a TikTok Live about Papadol's emotions around the time of the band's first tour, and announced an extended version of Retrovision, which included new track "Medicine" along with two remixes of tracks from the album. In May 2025, they released "Risk", a track about fear. In early November, they released their second track of the year, "Poison Apple Baby".

== Artistry ==
In January 2023, Papadol stated in an interview with Rock Sound that her biggest inspirations were You Me at Six, Paramore, The Band Camino, and "Disney rock" such as Hannah Montana, Demi Lovato, Jonas Brothers, and Aly & AJ. Papadol gained the confidence to pursue a career in music in July 2018, when she was invited on stage from the audience of a Paramore concert to sing "Misery Business" alongside Hayley Williams. During a May 2023 interview with Dork, Papadol stated that she spent much of her teenage years infatuated with Sleeping with Sirens and was so obsessed with Paramore's "Turn It Off" that she created an email account incorporating its lyric, and Lloyd stated that they took up the guitar after playing Guitar Hero and that they wanted to become a concert guitarist after seeing State Champs in concert. In an interview with Kerrang! in June 2023, Papadol stated that her "first introductions" to music were the "punk-rock chicks" Hannah Montana and Demi Lovato and the "edgier pop" of P!nk and Katy Perry and that she was also influenced by Paramore and the metalcore scene. Lloyd used the same interview to state that they were influenced by shapeshifting "chameleon" bands such as You Me at Six and Pierce the Veil. Scene Queen is a fan of the band.

== Members ==
Band members

- Devin Papadol – lead vocals (2021–present)
- Donny Lloyd – guitar (2021–present)

== Tours ==
=== Headlining ===
- European Tour (2024; eight shows)
- The Loving and Losing Tour (2025; 33 shows scheduled)

=== Supporting ===
- Loveless – World Tour (2023; twelve shows)
- Stand Atlantic – UK & Europe Tour (2024; fourteen shows)
- Meet Me at the Altar – The Say It To My Face Tour (2024; twenty-three shows)

== Discography ==
- Retrovision (2023)
- Loving and Losing (2026)
