= Amigo the Devil =

Singer-songwriter (born 1987)

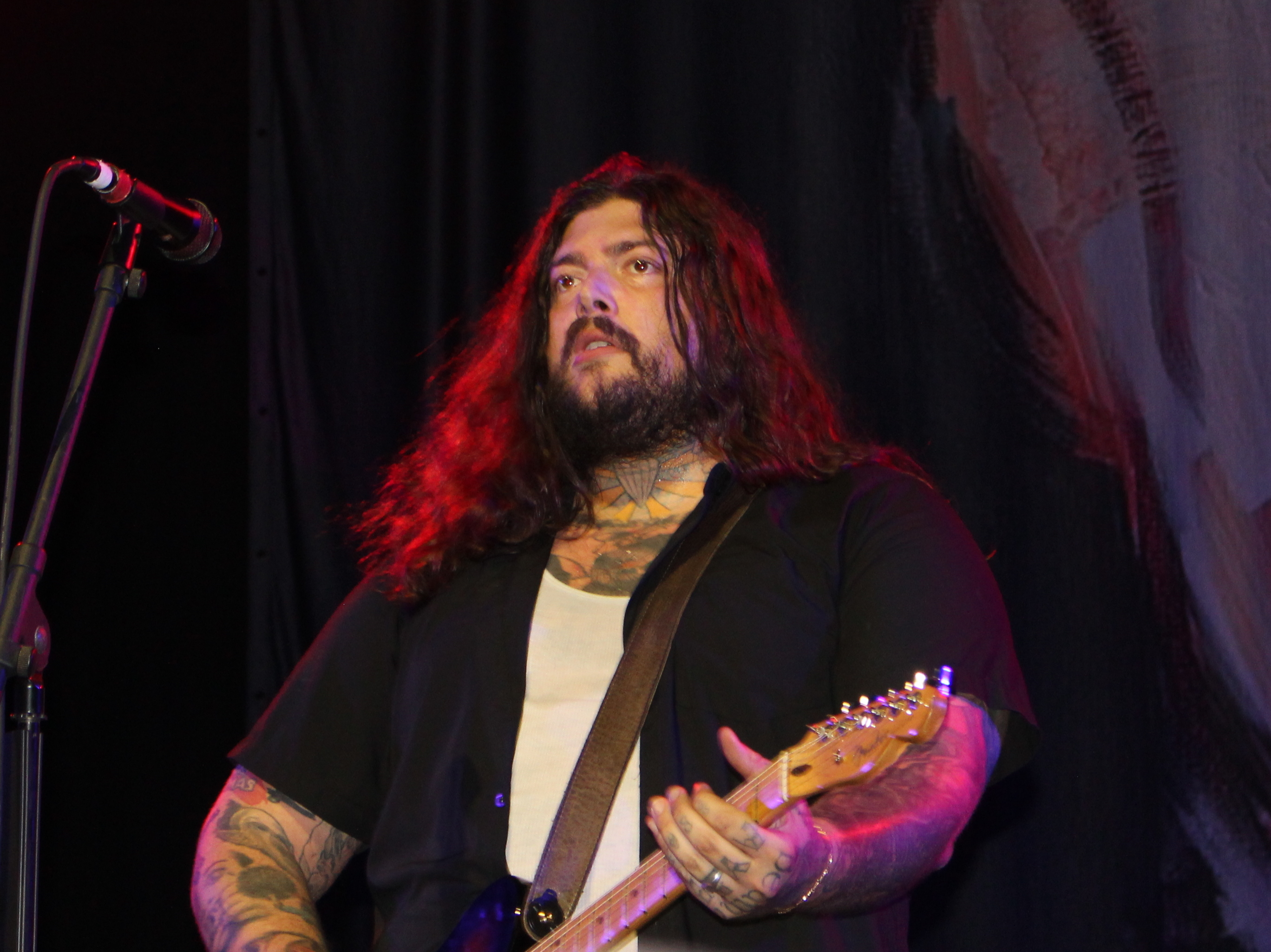
- Kiranos performing at the Rialto Theatre, Tucson, Arizona, in 2023

Background information
- Born: Danny Kiranos; June 26, 1987 (age 39); Miami, Florida
- Origin: San Francisco, California
- Genres: Gothic country; indie folk
- Instruments: Guitar, banjo
- Label: Liars Club Records
- Website: amigothedevil.com

Danny Kiranos (born June 26, 1987), known professionally as Amigo the Devil, is an American singer-songwriter, guitarist, and banjo player. His music is influenced by American folk, country, rock, and heavy metal, with themes of murder, death, and other dark subject matters which has led to his music being called "Dark Folk" or "Murderfolk". Kiranos created the record label Liars Club Records with the label Regime Music Group.

== Biography ==
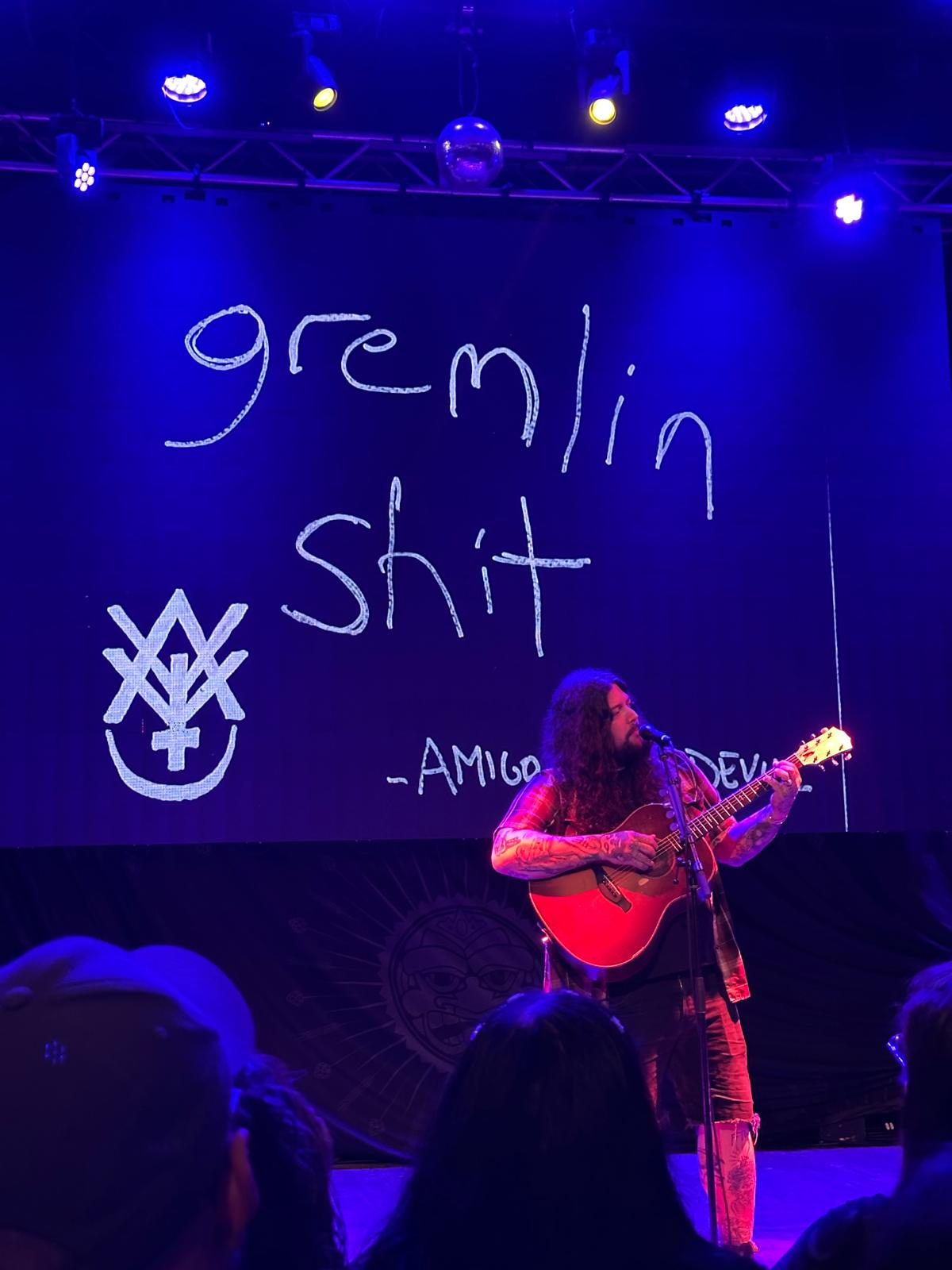
Kiranos in May 2025 performing at The Vogue Theatre in Indianapolis, Indiana.

Kiranos was born and raised in Miami, Florida. He is the son of a Greek father and a Spanish mother, and was influenced by the traditional music of both cultures. Once he was seventeen, he started moving around the country, and first went to California to attend the Los Angeles Film School to make horror films but quickly dropped out and enrolled in a local culinary school. He eventually settled down and worked in the brewing industry. While in San Francisco, California, Kiranos started going by his stage name Amigo the Devil. He started gaining popularity for his energetic live performances and built-up a fanbase.

In 2019, Mayor Steve Adler of the city of Austin, Texas announced November 16 as "Amigo the Devil Day" in the city and awarded a signed seal to Kiranos.

== Music festival appearances ==
- Muddy Roots Music Festival 2019 (Labor Day Weekend) MuddyRoots.com
- Aftershock 2018
- Sonic Temple Art & Music Festival 2019
- Welcome to Rockville 2019
- IMPACT Music Festival 2019
- Louder Than Life 2019
- Welcome to Rockville 2021
- Riot Fest 2021
- Lunasea Beach Festival 2022
- Louder Than Life 2022
- Aftershock 2022
- Fairwell Festival 2023
- Hell and Heaven open air 2023
- Muddy Roots Music Festival 2023 (Labor Day Weekend) MuddyRoots.com
- Shamrock Rebellion March 2024
- Festival d'été de Québec July 5, 2024
- Mariposa Folk Festival July 7, 2024
- 2000Trees 13 July 2024
- Galway International Arts Festival 20 July 2024
- Bourbon and Beyond September 2024
- Muddy Roots Music Festival 2025 (Labor Day Weekend) MuddyRoots.com
- Welcome to Rockville May 2025
- Milwaukee Metal Fest May 18, 2025
- Punk Rock Bowling May 2025
- Blue Ox Music Festival June 2025
- RBC Bluesfest July 11, 2025

== Discography ==
=== Albums ===
Title	Release date	Notes
Volume 1	September 1, 2015	A collection of his first three EPs
Everything Is Fine	October 19, 2018	
Born Against	April 16, 2021	
Yours Until The War Is Over	February 23, 2024	

=== EPs ===
Title	Release date
Manimals	October 26, 2010
Diggers	February 19, 2013
Decompositions	June 16, 2015
Covers, Demos, Live Versions, B-Sides	September 25, 2020
