= PeelingFlesh =

American death metal band

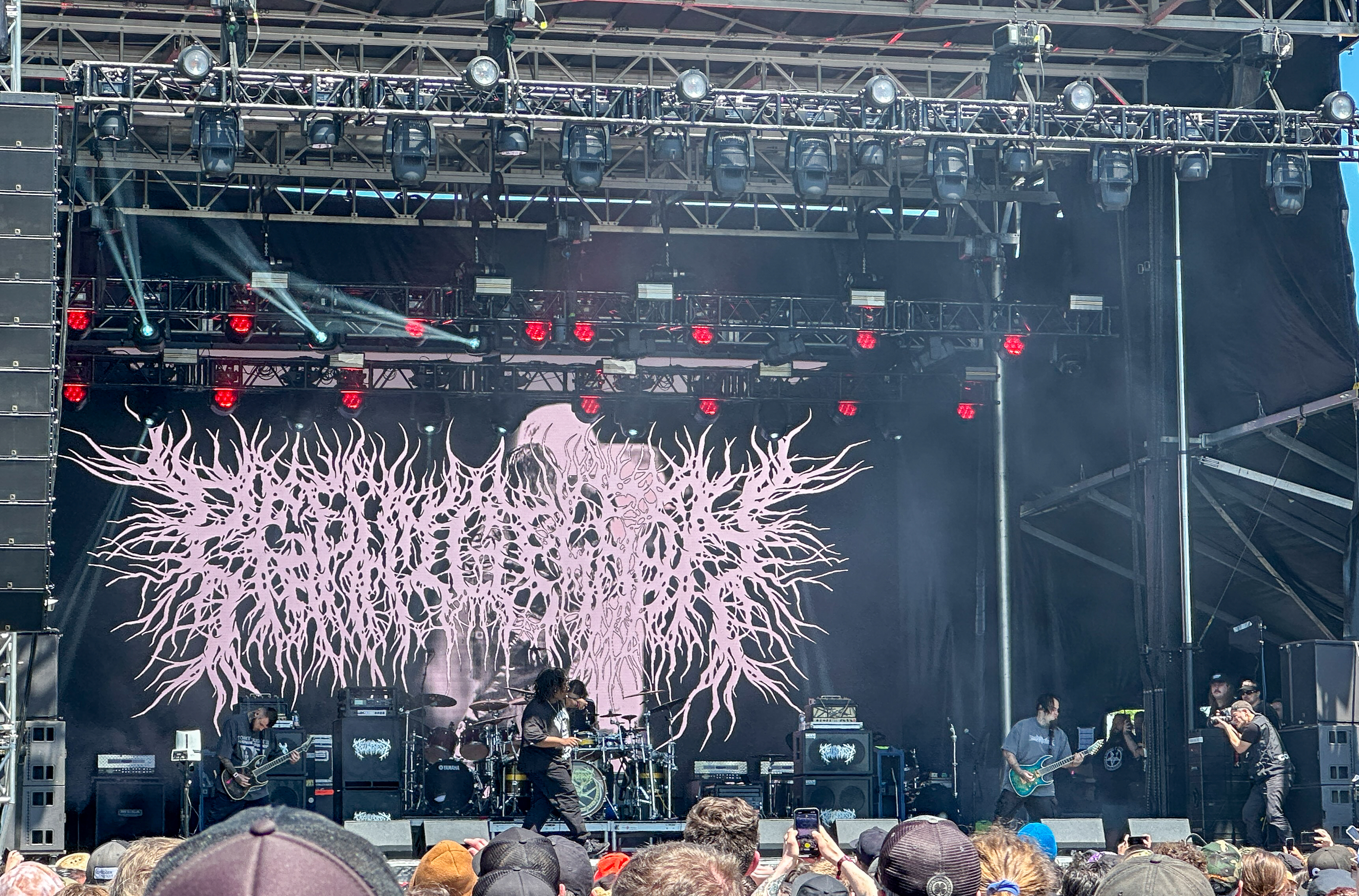
- PeelingFlesh performing in May 2025

Background information
- Origin: Oklahoma City, Oklahoma, U.S.
- Genres: Slam death metal; brutal death metal; beatdown hardcore
- Years active: 2021–present
- Label: Unique Leader
- Website: peelingfleshok.bandcamp.com

PeelingFlesh is an American slam death metal band formed in 2021 in Oklahoma City, Oklahoma.

== History ==
After deathcore band Strangled disbanded, members Mychal Soto, Austin Hirom, and Joe Pelletier formed PeelingFlesh with Jason Parrish and Damonteal Harris. They released their debut EP, Slamaholics Mixtape, on September 10, 2021, followed by Winter Mixtape Promo on December 24, 2021.

They released the EP Human Pudding on June 1. In 2023, they released PF Radio, signed to Unique Leader Records, and released Slamaholics, Vol. 2. that fall. PeelingFlesh played at Oklahoma Death Fest in 2023 with Dying Fetus and Cattle Decapitation.

To mark their third anniversary in 2024, PeelingFlesh released 3 Year Peeling Spree, a compilation of their previous releases. That September, they released their first full-length album, The G Code.

In late 2024, PeelingFlesh toured North America with Whitechapel and Revocation. The following year, they released their second full-length album, PF Radio 2, following their EP from two years prior. They performed at the Sonic Temple music festival in Columbus, Ohio that year.

In 2025, bassist Austin Hirom left the band to spend time with family. Chip Smith replaced him on January 22, 2026. The following month, the band was announced for Louisville's Louder Than Life music festival in September.

On July 26, 2026, the band announced their self-titled second album would be released in the fall.

== Musical style and lyrics ==
PeelingFlesh's musical style blends elements of slamming brutal death metal with hardcore influences and the group's songs frequently include samples of hip-hop and Blaxploitation films, resulting in what they refer to as "Slamming Gangster Groove", which is a play on Waking the Cadaver's tagline of referring to their music as "Slamming Gore Groove". The group's lyrical themes include gore, murder, and thuggery.

== Band members ==
=== Current ===
- Damonteal Harris – vocals (2021–present)
- Jason Parrish – guitars (2021–present)
- Mychal Soto – guitars (2021–present)
- Joe Pelletier – drums (2021–present)
- Chip Smith – bass, fill-in live guitar (2026–present)

=== Touring ===
- Mike Caputo – drums (2026)

=== Former ===
- Austin Hirom – bass (2021–2025)

== Discography ==
=== Studio albums ===
- The G Code (2024)
- PeelingFlesh (2026)

=== EPs ===
- Winter Mixtape Promo (2021)
- Slamaholics (2021)
- Deformed Through Gluttony (2021) – A split release with .357 Homicide, Traumatomy, and Coprocephalic Mutation.
- Bathtub Execution (2021)
- Ghetto as Hell (2022)
- Human Pudding (2022)
- PF Radio (2023)
- Slamaholics Vol. 2 (2023)
- Brainflesh (2024) – A split release with Brains Outward.
- PF Radio 2 (2025)
- OKC X GTHC (2025) - A split release with Hounds of War.

=== Compilations ===
- Slampilation Mixtape (2022)
- 3 Year Peeling Spree (2024)

=== Collaborations ===
- Sinizter and PeelingFlesh – "Mangled"
- Svdden Death, Nimda, yvm3 and PeelingFlesh – "Midnight"
- Sinizter and PeelingFlesh – "Postmortem Anomalies"
