= Thriller Records =

American independent record label

- Founded: 2021
- Founder: Bob Becker, Nick Moore
- Status: Active
- Distributor: Stem
- Genre: Rock
- Country of origin: U.S.
- Location: Los Angeles, California; Findlay, Ohio
- Official website: thrillerrecords.com

Thriller Records is an American independent record label that was founded in 2021 by Bob Becker, founder of Fearless Records and Nick Moore, former singer of the band Before Their Eyes and founder of InVogue Records. The label initially had a global distribution agreement with ADA Music Worldwide, a subsidiary of Warner Music Group, but would later sign with The Orchard, a subsidiary of Sony Music.

After Fearless Records was acquired by Concord Music Group in 2015, then Chairman Bob Becker decided to form Thriller Records after "missing the excitement and challenge of running a record label on a day-to-day basis" with the objective of "housing a variety of alternative and rock acts".

The label has signed acts such as the Word Alive, Rain City Drive, and Honey Revenge.

== History ==
Thriller Records was founded in June 2021 by Fearless Records founder Bob Becker and co-founded by musician Nick Moore. Becker was the president of said label until Concord Music Group acquired it in 2015. After the sale, Becker would go on to become its Chairman Emeritus. While still associated with signings, such as the signing of the Offspring, he would cite the need to "embrac[e] the way music is now discovered and consumed" for founding Thriller Records. Co-founder Nick Moore, then owner of InVogue Records, would join as Operations Manager.

Seattle-based metalcore band AVOID became the first signing. Albums released by the label would include Hard Reset by The Word Alive along with AVOID's debut.

In June 2022, Thriller Records acquired InVogue Records. The acquisition was said to cover the purchase of InVogue's brand, catalog of masters and publishing. InVogue would then operate under the Thriller Records umbrella "showcasing a publishing division."

== Signed artists ==
- Broadside
- Catch Your Breath
- Dark Divine
- Dead Eyes
- Hawthorne Heights
- The Home Team
- Honey Revenge
- If Not For Me
- Makari
- Not Enough Space
- In Her Own Words
- Rain City Drive
- The Word Alive

== See also ==
- List of record labels
- Fearless Records
