= Broadside (band) =

American pop punk band

- Origin: Richmond, Virginia, U.S.
- Genres: Pop punk; pop rock; pop
- Years active: 2010–present
- Labels: Victory, SharpTone, Thriller
- Members: Ollie Baxxter; Pat Diaz; Dom Reid; Tay Ewart

Broadside is an American pop rock band from Richmond, Virginia. They were signed to Victory Records, SharpTone Records, and are now signed to Thriller Records. They were listed as one of the 100 Artists You Need To Know in 2015 by Alternative Press. By 2015, Broadside had no original members left in the band.

== History ==
Formed in 2010, Broadside have shared the stage with bands such as the Ataris, A Loss for Words, Such Gold, Title Fight, Forever Came Calling, and Polar Bear Club. In June 2011 the band self-released their five-song EP, Far From Home, which was then re-recorded in 2012 with five additional tracks to become their first full-length album by the same name and put out on independent Japanese record label Ice Grill$ Records.

In January 2013 the band announced they had recruited Ollie Baxxter as their new lead vocalist. In October they released a music video for "Storyteller", followed by a video for their original holiday-themed "Wish List" in December.

Broadside spent the first half of 2014 touring and playing shows with various artists including Of Fortune and Fame, Old Again, Battleghost. In October 2014 Broadside contributed a demo version of their song "Avery" in partnership with Hope For the Day and PropertyOfZack to help raise awareness for suicide prevention.

On March 10, 2015, it was announced that the band had signed to Victory Records, which was accompanied by pre-orders for Old Bones set for release on May 19, 2015, along with a music video for the new single "Coffee Talk". In late September 2015, founding member Bassist Josh Glupker left for undisclosed reasons.

On June 16, 2017, the band released its second studio album, Paradise. On July 8, 2017, the album peaked at the No. 17 position on the Billboard Heatseekers chart.

On May 15, 2019, the band released King of Nothing / Empty.

On July 24, 2020, the band released Into the Raging Sea.

On July 12, 2022, the band released a music video for their new single "One Last Time."

On March 15, 2023, the band released a music video for their new single "Cruel," which featured Brian Butcher from the band The Home Team.

On April 18, 2025, the band released a music video for their new single "I Think They Know", as well as announced that they had signed with Thriller Records.

On June 6, 2025, the band released another new single titled "Warning Signs."

On April 10, 2026, the band released Nowhere, At Last.

== Band members ==
Current

- Oliver Baxxter – vocals (2013–present)
- Pat Diaz – bass (2015–present)
- Domenic Reid – guitar (2017–present)
- Tay Ewart - drums (2025–present)

Past

- Bryant Leary – vocals (2010–2013)
- Kyle Foundry – guitar (2010–2012)
- Jade Estrella – guitar (2010–2013)
- Josh Glupker – bass (2010–2015)
- Andrew Dunton – drums (2010–2016)
- John Painter – guitar (2012)
- Niles Gibbs – guitar (2013–2017)
- Dorian Cooke – guitar vocals (2015–2019)
- Jeff Nichols – drums (2016–2022)

Timeline

== Discography ==
Studio albums

- Old Bones (2015)
- Paradise (2017)
- Into the Raging Sea (2020)
- Hotel Bleu (2023)
- Nowhere, At Last (2026)

Demos

- Far from Home (2011)
