= Dark Divine (band) =

American metalcore band

- Origin: Orlando, Florida, U.S.
- Genres: Metalcore; post-hardcore
- Years active: 2021–present
- Labels: InVogue; Thriller
- Members: Anthony Martinez; Robby Lynch; Triston Blaize Gandia; Cory Scissorhands
- Past members: Jason Thomas Mueller; Jarret Robinson
- Website: www.darkdivineofficial.com

Dark Divine is an American metalcore band from Orlando, Florida, formed in 2021. The band, noted for their gothic Halloween theme, consists of vocalist Anthony Martinez (formerly of Not Enough Space), guitarist Robby Lynch, drummer Triston Blaize Gandia, and bassist Cory "Scissorhands" Piscitelli. The band has released one EP, and two studio albums, Deadly Fun, in September 2023, and Undead Melody, in May 2026.

== History ==
=== Formation, Halloweentown EP, and Deadly Fun (2021–2024) ===
Dark Divine were formed in 2021. They were signed by Invogue Records in 2022 where they released their first EP. In 2023, the band moved to Thriller Records. Their debut full-length album, Deadly Fun, was released on September 8, 2023, to positive reviews from fans and critics in the metalcore scene. On October 4, 2024, a deluxe edition of the album was released including the new single "Burn The Witch". Dark Divine has toured with bands such as Famous Last Words, Holding Absence, Until I Wake, Catch Your Breath, The Word Alive, and Ice Nine Kills.

=== Undead Melody (2025–present) ===
On April 25, 2025, Not Enough Space and Dark Divine released the single "Eye 4 an Eye", which featured on both the former's EP, Waiting 4 U, and subsequently their album, Weaponize Your Rage. On May 22, the band released the single "Make Me Disappear".

Dark Divine was the opening act along with TX2 and Kingdom of Giants, for the Summer of Loud 2025 tour, in which they performed from July 16 to July 27, headlined by Parkway Drive, Killswitch Engage, Beartooth, and I Prevail, with other acts consisting of the Amity Affliction, The Devil Wears Prada, and Alpha Wolf. During the tour, on July 18, the band released the single, "Better Start Digging". On September 26, the band released the single "Halloweentown II: Welcome Home", as a sequel to their debut single.

On January 30, 2026, Dark Divine released the single "Permanent". On February 27, the band announced their second studio album, Undead Melody, would release May 29, 2026, and alongside the announcement released the fifth single, "Midnight Masquerade". On March 27, the sixth single, "Half Past Dead (Unbury Me)", and its music video were released. On May 1, the band released the seventh single, "Fading Away".

On May 29, Dark Divine's second album, Undead Melody, was released.

Martinez featured on the track "Blood Rave", which was also co-written by Martinez, Lynch and Gandia, from Motionless in White's seventh studio album Decades, which released July 17.

== Musical style and influences ==
Dark Divine has been described as metalcore and post-hardcore. The band's music often has themes of horror and Halloween, and have cited bands such as Motionless in White and Ice Nine Kills as influences.

== Band members ==
=== Current ===
- Anthony Martinez – lead vocals (2021–present)
- Robby Lynch – rhythm guitar (2021–present), lead guitar (2024–present)
- Triston Blaize Gandia – drums (2021–present)
- Cory "Scissorhands" Piscitelli – bass (2023–present)

=== Former ===
- Jason Thomas Mueller – lead guitar (2021–2024)
- Jarret Robinson – bass (2021–2023)
- Ryan Shelton - bass (2021)

== Discography ==
=== Studio albums ===
List of studio albums, with selected details
Title	Album details
Deadly Fun	Released: September 8, 2023; Label: Thriller Records
Undead Melody	Released: May 29, 2026; Label: Thriller Records

=== Extended plays ===
List of extended plays, with selected details
Title	Album details
Halloweentown	Released: September 30, 2022; Label: InVogue Records

=== Singles ===
==== As lead artist ====
List of singles as lead artist
Title	Year	Album
"Halloweentown"	2021	Halloweentown
"The Fear"	2022	Halloweentown
"Your Ghost"	2022	Halloweentown
"Circles"	2022	Halloweentown
"Run Away"	2022	Halloweentown
"No Escape" (featuring Ricky Armellino)	2022	Halloweentown
"Drown"	2023	Deadly Fun
"Dancing Dead"	2023	Deadly Fun
"Paper Crown" (featuring Bryan Kuznitz of Fame on Fire)	2023	Deadly Fun
"Cold"	2023	Deadly Fun
"Burn the Witch"	2024	Deadly Fun (Deluxe Edition)
"Digital Numb"	2024	Deadly Fun (Deluxe Edition)
"Make Me Disappear"	2025	Undead Melody
"Better Start Digging"	2025	Undead Melody
"Halloweentown II: Welcome Home"	2025	Undead Melody
"Permanent"	2026	Undead Melody
"Midnight Masquerade"	2026	Undead Melody
"Half Past Dead (Unbury Me)"	2026	Undead Melody
"Fading Away"	2026	Undead Melody
"Rhiannon" (Fleetwood Mac cover)	2026	Non-album single

==== As featured artist ====
List of singles as featured artist
Title	Year	Album
"Eye 4 an Eye" (with Not Enough Space)	2025	Waiting 4 U & Weaponize Your Rage

=== Music videos ===
List of music videos, showing year released, album and director(s)
Title	Year	Album	Director(s)	Link
"Halloweentown"	2021	Halloweentown	Toddi Babu	
"The Fear"	2022	Halloweentown	Toddi Babu	
"Your Ghost"	2022	Halloweentown	Eric Dicarlo	
"Circles"	2022	Halloweentown	Eric Dicarlo	
"Run Away"	2022	Halloweentown	Eric Dicarlo	
"No Escape" (featuring Ricky Armellino)	2022	Halloweentown	Eric Dicarlo	
"Drown"	2023	Deadly Fun	Joey Durango	
"Dancing Dead"	2023	Deadly Fun	Daniel Hourihan	
"Paper Crown"	2023	Deadly Fun	Joey Durango	
"Cold"	2023	Deadly Fun	Joey Durango	
"Burn the Witch"	2024	Deadly Fun (Deluxe Edition)	Joey Durango	
"Digital Numb"	2024	Deadly Fun (Deluxe Edition)	—N/a	
"Eye 4 an Eye" (with Not Enough Space)	2025	Waiting 4 U & Weaponize Your Rage	Toddi Babu	
"Make Me Disappear"	2025	Undead Melody	Joey Durango	
"Halloweentown II: Welcome Home"	2025	Undead Melody	Evan Draper	
"Permanent"	2026	Undead Melody	Juan "J.T." Ibanez	
"Half Past Dead (Unbury Me)"	2026	Undead Melody	Alex Kouvatsos	
