= The Breton Sound =

American rock band

- Origin: New Orleans, Louisiana, U.S.
- Genres: Rock
- Years active: 2011–present
- Members: Jonathan Pretus; Stephen Turner; John Bourgeois; Joe Bourgeois
- Past members: Brian Pretus; Wes Kennison; Jason Navo
- Website: www.thebretonsound.com

The Breton Sound is an American rock band based in New Orleans, Louisiana, United States.

Founded in 2011, the Breton Sound began as a collaboration of longtime friends Jonathan Pretus (ex-Cowboy Mouth)and Stephen Turner. Together they produced the EP, Eudaemonia, which combined their varied musical influences and was produced by Tom Drummond of Better than Ezra. Within the year, Pretus's brother Brian (Pears) was brought in for bass and backing vocals. 2013 brought their new EP, Maps, and a new drummer, John Bourgeois (Fatter Than Albert, Dead Legends), followed by his brother, bassist Joe Bourgeois (MyNameIsJohnMichael).

In 2015, the band released the EP Don't Be Afraid of Rock and Roll, Vol. 1, with Tom Drummond remaining at the helm as producer. The EP was recorded at Ardent Studios in Memphis, Southern Ground Studios in Atlanta, and The Music Shed in New Orleans. The project was designed to take the band to various historical studios around the South in an effort to capture the vibe and history of the rooms.

In 2015, the band were nominated by Gambit Weekly for Best Emerging Artist, and in October 2015 the band won the Louisiana Music Prize.

The Breton Sound EP, released in July 2018, was recorded in New Orleans at 1920s church-turned-recording facility, Esplanade Studios (Eric Clapton, Elvis Costello, Mary J. Blige, The Roots) by the well-known and highly regarded producer and mixer, Jeff Glixman (Black Sabbath, Bob Marley and the Wailers, Kansas). Prior to recording, the band and Glixman were approached by PreSonus Audio Electronics and offered the chance to test-drive their new studio recording software, StudioOne4. Working with the Baton Rouge-based company seemed a natural fit (Pretus and Turner met while students at Louisiana State University). PreSonus was looking to put their Studio One platform in direct competition with the likes of industry-standard Pro Tools, and The Breton Sound was looking to make a record that put them on the same playing field as the rock acts that populate today's radio dials and streaming playlists.

In 2020, with John Bourgeois moving away from New Orleans, the band went on indefinite hiatus. Pretus, Turner, and Joe Bourgeois, along with drummer Kyle Melancon (Imagination Movers/ex-Dash Rip Rock) perform regionally as 90s coverband Big in the 90s, and nod to the comment The Breton Sound received from several record labels and management that they "would've been big in the 90s."

== Discography ==
- Eudaemonia (2011)
- Maps (2013)
- "Wonderful Christmastime" single (Paul McCartney cover) (2014)
- Don't Be Afraid of Rock and Roll, Vol. 1 (2015)
- The Breton Sound (2018)
