= The Home Team =

American rock band

- Origin: Seattle, Washington, U.S.
- Genres: Alternative rock; pop punk; post-hardcore
- Years active: 2013–present
- Labels: Thriller; Revival Recordings
- Members: Brian Butcher; John Baran; Ryne Olson; Daniel Matson
- Past members: Jairod Collins; Nick Alzate; Alex Larson; Rob Saireh; Anthony Uy; Ryan Murgatroyd

The Home Team is an American rock band from Seattle, Washington, formed in 2013 by Daniel Matson and John Baran. The band currently consists of vocalist Brian Butcher, bassist Ryne Olson, guitarist John Baran, and drummer Daniel Matson.

Since its formation, The Home Team has performed alongside major acts like Don Broco, Senses Fail, Neck Deep, and The Used among others. By 2025, The Home Team has released numerous singles and music videos, one EP, and three full-length studio albums - with their most recent album, The Crucible of Life (2024), released via Thriller Records.

== History ==
Guitarist John Baran and drummer Daniel Matson, who played in hardcore and metal bands in the early 2010s, wrote some pop-punk songs together as a side-project. After the aforementioned bands broke up, The Home Team was finally formed by Baran and Matson in 2013. The first lineup was completed with vocalist Jairod Collins, guitarist Nick Alzate, and bassist Alex Larson.

In 2014, the band released their debut EP, Black Sheep.

In 2015, Collins, Alzate, and Larson left the band and were replaced by vocalist Brian Butcher, guitarist Ryan Murgatroyd, and bassist Rob Saireh, with whom the band independently released their first singles, Burning Gold and Letters from a Friend, in 2016.

In early 2018, The Home Team signed with Revival Recordings and released their debut label single, "Fashion Forward". On July 20, 2018, the band released their debut album, Better Off, co-produced by Casey Bates (Portugal. The Man, Pierce the Veil, Emarosa), to positive reviews. In 2018, bassist Rob Saireh left the band to join a deathcore band Enterprise Earth, was briefly replaced by Anthony Uy, and later by Ryne Olson.

In 2019, Murgatroyd stepped away from the band to focus on his job as an audio engineer. He later passed away in June of 2023. The Home Team performed at his memorial on August 4th, 2023 which was held at The Crocodile in Seattle, where they played songs from their album Better Off in his honor.

The second studio album, Slow Bloom, produced by Issues/Twenty One Pilots bassist Skyler Accord and Neck Deep bassist Seb Barlow, was released on October 22, 2021. In 2022, the band released a deluxe version of Slow Bloom featuring new songs "FOMO (Bored of You)" and "Grievance Pay".

In March 2023, The Home Team signed to Thriller Records. In late 2023, the band supported Don Broco on their "The Amazing Things North America Tour" along with Skyler Acord, The Color 8, and Ryan Oakes. On October 13, 2023, to promote this tour Don Broco released a single "Birthday Party (Party in the U.S.A. Remix)" featuring all the tourmates.

On November 29, 2023, Brian Butcher was announced as a fill-in vocalist for all the farewell shows of the band Issues which took place in January 2024.

On July 12, 2024, The Home Team released their third studio album, The Crucible of Life, produced by Zach Jones with co-writing from Skyler Acord and Tyler Acord. In Fall of 2024, the band toured the US supporting Neck Deep, and in December of 2024, played a sold out UK tour. In February of 2025, The Home Team toured the UK supporting State Champs along with Broadside. In Spring of 2025, the band toured the US supporting Dance Gavin Dance on the "Return Of The Robot Tour".

On June 13, 2025, The Crucible of Life (Deluxe Edition), with an extended version of "All Squeezed Out", and three more additional songs, including a new single "Worthy", was released. In September of 2025, the band played their first shows in Japan and Australia supporting Mayday Parade on their "Three Cheers for 20 Years Tour".

In late 2025, the band toured the US on their headliner "The Crucible of Life Fall Tour 2025" with support from Arrows in Action and Makari.

On November 15, 2025, The Home Team performed at Warped Tour Orlando 2025.

== Musical style ==
The Home Team describes their style as "heavy pop". Although the band is primarily influenced by rock and metal, they have incorporated elements from various other genres such as R&B, pop, funk, hip-hop and J-rock into their music.

In the review of The Home Team's third album, The Crucible of Life, Rachel Roberts of Kerrang wrote that the band "brings the risqué lyricism of Deftones into the world of springy pop-rock", and recommended The Home Team to the fans of Don Broco, The Maine, and Panic! at the Disco.

The Home Team's influences include such acts as Fall Out Boy, Panic! at the Disco, All Time Low, State Champs, the Story So Far, I the Mighty, Coheed and Cambria, Jimmy Eat World, Circa Survive, and the Receiving End of Sirens.

== Band members ==
Current members

- John Baran – guitars (2013–present)
- Daniel Matson – drums (2013–present)
- Brian Butcher – vocals (2015–present)
- Ryne Olson – bass (2019–present)

Former members

- Jairod Collins – vocals (2013–2015)
- Rob Saireh – bass (2013–2018)
- Ryan Murgatroyd – guitars (2013–2019)
- Nick Alzate – guitars (2014–2015)
- Alex Larson – bass (2014–2015)
- Anthony Uy – bass (2018–2019)

Touring members

- King Zabb – guitars (2019)

Timeline

== Discography ==
=== Studio albums ===
- Better Off (2018, Revival Recordings)
- Slow Bloom (2021, Thriller Records)
- The Crucible of Life (2024, Thriller Records)
- It Lives, It Changes (2026, Thriller Records)

=== EP ===
- Black Sheep (2014)

=== Singles ===
Title	Year	Peak chart positions	Albums/EP
Title	Year	US Hot Hard Rock	Albums/EP
"Burning Gold"	2016	×	Non-album singles
"Letters From a Friend"	2016	×	Non-album singles
"Fashion Forward"	2018	×	Better Off
"Ageless"	2018	×	Better Off
"She's Quiet"	2018	×	Better Off
"Since We All Fell Apart"	2018	×	Better Off
"She's Quiet" (Acoustic)	2019	×	Non-album singles
"Fashion Forward" (Acoustic)	2019	×	Non-album singles
"Loud"	2023	×	The Crucible of Life
"Brag"	2023	×	The Crucible of Life
"Hell"	2024	×	The Crucible of Life
"Roommates" // "Overtime"	2024	×	The Crucible of Life
"Walk This World With Me"	2024	×	The Crucible of Life
"Worthy"	2025	25	The Crucible of Life (Deluxe Edition)

=== Guest appearances ===
- Aim High - "Here Lies Kakarot's Hopes & Dreams" (feat. The Home Team) (off the album Local Band Forever, 2021)
- Northvale - "Runaway" (feat. The Home Team) (Single, 2022)
- Good Call - "Sunset Silhouette" (feat. The Home Team) (Single, 2022)
- This Wild Life - "Dead to Me" (feat. Brian Butcher, The Home Team) (off the album Never Fade, 2023)
- When the Sun Sets - "Seasons" (feat. The Home Team) (off the album You + Me 4 Never, 2023)
- Arrows in Action - "Wide Eyes" (feat. Brian Butcher, The Home Team) (off the album Built to Last, 2023)
- Broadside - "Cruel" (feat. Brian Butcher, The Home Team) (off the album Hotel Bleu, 2023)
- Don Broco - "Birthday Party - Party in the U.S.A. Remix" (feat. The Home Team, The Color 8, Skyler Acord, Ryan Oakes) (Single, 2023)

=== Music videos ===
Year	Title	Director	Album	Link
2018	Fashion Forward	Daniel Matson	Better Off	
2018	Ageless	Austin Hodaie	Better Off	
2018	Since We All Fell Apart	Brian Butcher	Better Off	
2021	Right Through Me	Brian Butcher	Slow Bloom	
2021	Move It Or Lose It	Brian Butcher	Slow Bloom	
2021	Slow Bloom	Brian Butcher	Slow Bloom	
2021	Another Night Alone With You (feat. Yvette Young)	Brian Butcher	Slow Bloom	
2021	Watching All Your Friends Get Rich	Mark Walters	Slow Bloom	
2022	Eat You Up	Mark Walters	Slow Bloom	
2022	Scary Movies	Mark Walters	Slow Bloom	
2022	FOMO (Bored of You)	Mark Walters	Slow Bloom (Deluxe)	
2023	Loud	Sam Link	The Crucible of Life	
2024	Brag	Sam Link	The Crucible of Life	
2024	Hell	Sam Link	The Crucible of Life	
2024	Roommates // Overtime	Sam Link	The Crucible of Life	
2024	Walk This World With Me	Sam Link	The Crucible of Life	
2025	Somebody Else's Face (feat. Broadside)	Sam Link	The Crucible of Life	
2025	Worthy	Sam Link	The Crucible of Life (Deluxe)	
