= Not Enough Space =

American rock band

- Origin: Orlando, Florida
- Genres: Metalcore; hard rock; post-hardcore
- Years active: 2018–present
- Label: Thriller
- Members: Elizabeth "Lizzie" Kristina Raatma; Olivia "Liv" Mitchell; Tristan Kaos Green; Jacob Sawyer; Maurice Jones
- Past members: Anthony Martinez

Not Enough Space is an American rock band from Orlando, Florida.

== History ==
Not Enough Space was formed in 2018, in Orlando, Florida. In March 2023, the band released the single "No Way Out", which has been described as a "fan favorite". In Spring 2024, the band toured alongside the bands Attila, Born of Osiris, Traitors, and Extortionist. In October 2024, the band signed to Thriller Records and released the single "Primitive", which featured a moaning sound which gave the song some notability and led to it being described as "moan-core". In March 2025, the band supported Capstan's The Cult tour, alongside the bands Colorblind and True North. In July 2025, the band announced their debut studio album, titled Weaponize Your Rage, would release on September 12, and released the single "New Age Cannibal". On August 8 2025, the band released the single "Don't Let Go".

== Musical style and influences ==
Not Enough Space have been described as metalcore, hard rock, post-hardcore, and "moan-core". The band have cited A Day to Remember, Asking Alexandria, Suicide Silence, The Black Dahlia Murder, Avenged Sevenfold, and Veil of Maya as influences.

== Band members ==
Current members

- Elizabeth "Lizzie" Kristina Raatma – lead clean vocals, unclean vocals (2018–present)
- Olivia "Liv" Mitchell – lead unclean vocals, clean vocals (2022–present)
- Maurice Jones – drums (2022–present)
- Tristan Kaos Green – guitar (2023–present)
- Jacob Sawyer – bass guitar (2023–present)

Former members

- Anthony Martinez (now of Dark Divine) – guitar and vocals (2018–2022)

Timeline

== Discography ==
=== Studio albums ===
List of studio albums, with selected details
| Title | Album details |
|---|---|
| Weaponize Your Rage | Released: September 12, 2025; Label: Thriller Records |

=== Extended plays ===
List of extended plays, with selected details
| Title | Album details |
|---|---|
| End This Way | Released: February 5, 2021; Label: Self-released |
| Waiting 4 U | Released: June 6, 2025; Label: Thriller Records |

=== Singles ===
List of singles as lead artist
| Title | Year | Album |
|---|---|---|
| "Distorted" | 2022 | —N/a |
| "Tear Me Apart" | 2022 | —N/a |
| "Sew My Eyes" | 2023 | —N/a |
| "No Way Out" | 2023 | —N/a |
| "Nightmares" | 2023 | —N/a |
| "Don't Be Scared" | 2023 | —N/a |
| "Goth Girl Dinner" (featuring Spider Inside Her) | 2023 | —N/a |
| "Primitive" | 2024 | Waiting 4 U & Weaponize Your Rage |
| "Solace in Silence" | 2025 | Waiting 4 U & Weaponize Your Rage |
| "Devil Left Me on Read" | 2025 | Waiting 4 U & Weaponize Your Rage |
| "Eye 4 an Eye" (with Dark Divine) | 2025 | Waiting 4 U & Weaponize Your Rage |
| "Waiting 4 U" | 2025 | Waiting 4 U & Weaponize Your Rage |
| "New Age Cannibal" | 2025 | Weaponize Your Rage |
| "Don't Let Go" | 2025 | Weaponize Your Rage |
| "Weaponize Your Rage" | 2025 | Weaponize Your Rage |

=== Music videos ===
List of music videos, showing year released, album and director(s)
| Title | Year | Album | Director(s) | Link |
|---|---|---|---|---|
| "Loveless" (featuring Kellin Quinn) | 2021 | End This Way | Wolfe Eliot | |
| "Distorted" | 2022 | —N/a | Toddi Babu | |
| "No Way Out" | 2023 | —N/a | Toddi Babu | |
| "Nightmares" | 2023 | —N/a | Toddi Babu | |
| "Don't Be Scared" | 2023 | —N/a | Toddi Babu | |
| "Goth Girl Dinner" (featuring Spiders Inside Her) | 2023 | —N/a | Toddi Babu | |
| "Primitive" | 2024 | Waiting 4 U & Weaponize Your Rage | Toddi Babu | |
| "Solace in Silence" | 2025 | Waiting 4 U & Weaponize Your Rage | Toddi Babu | |
| "Devil Left Me on Read" | 2025 | Waiting 4 U & Weaponize Your Rage | Toddi Babu | |
| "Eye 4 an Eye" (with Dark Divine) | 2025 | Waiting 4 U & Weaponize Your Rage | Toddi Babu | |
| "Don't Let Go" | 2025 | Weaponize Your Rage | Toddi Babu | |
| "Weaponize Your Rage" | 2025 | Weaponize Your Rage | Toddi Babu | |
| "Dancing on My Grave" | 2026 | Weaponize Your Rage | —N/a | |

== Awards and nominations ==
| Year | Award ceremony | Category | Result | Ref. |
|---|---|---|---|---|
| 2025 | Nik Nocturnal Awards | Breakthrough Band of the Year | Nominated | |
