= Cliver =

Cliver is a surname. Notable people with the surname include:

- Al Cliver (born 1951), Italian actor
- Rose Cliver, San Francisco earthquake survivor
