= Tremonti =

Tremonti is an Italian surname. Its meaning is "three hills". Notable people with this surname include:

- Anna Maria Tremonti (born 1957), Canadian journalist
- Giulio Tremonti (born 1947), Italian Minister for Economy and Finance
- Mark Tremonti (born 1974), American lead guitarist for the bands Alter Bridge, Creed
  - Tremonti (band), a solo project by the above musician
- Thiago Tremonti (born 1985), Brazilian football player, currently playing for Pandurii Targu-Jiu
