= Liliac (band) =

Atlanta based heavy metal band

- Origin: Los Angeles, California, USA
- Genres: Rock, heavy metal
- Years active: 2015– 2025
- Members: Melody Cristea; Samuel Cristea; Abigail Cristea; Ethan Cristea; Justin Cristea
- Website: liliacband.com

Liliac was a rock band formed in 2015 in Los Angeles, California. The band was based in Atlanta, Georgia. Its members are siblings Melody Cristea, Samuel Cristea, Abigail Cristea, Ethan Cristea, and Justin Cristea.

== Music ==
Their genre is often referred to as heavy metal or rock, while they refer to it as "vamp metal."

== Members ==
- Melody Cristea (born December 27, 2001) - vocals, bass, flute
- Samuel Cristea (born March 21, 1999) - lead guitar, backing vocals
- Abigail Cristea (born February 24, 2000) - drums
- Ethan Cristea (born August 24, 2006) - bass, rhythm guitar
- Justin Cristea (born October 27, 2007) - keyboard
- Alexa Rae (born September 29, 1998) - touring drummer
- Paul Barnes, Jr. - touring drummer

== History ==
Florin Cristea, the father of the band members, was born in Transylvania, Romania. He worked as a music producer for many years and introduced his children to music, arranging lessons and helping to form the band. As of June 2022, Liliac had released five albums. During the COVID-19 pandemic, the band relocated from Los Angeles to Atlanta.

The group performed regularly at the Santa Monica Pier for several years while building their fan base. They were later asked to stop performing there due to the large crowds they attracted. Florin Cristea also serves as the band's manager.

Liliac competed on The World's Best, hosted by James Corden. They also appeared on America's Got Talent, where their performance "dropped the jaw" of judge Simon Cowell.

The band's name translates to "bat" in Romanian, the native language of their parents.

Their recording "We Are the Children," from their second album Queen of Hearts, reached number one on Amazon's rock chart for new releases and best sellers.

On November 19, 2026, Liliac announced that lead singer Melody was leaving the band to pursue Christian music.

== Discography ==
Liliac released their debut album, Chain of Thorns, in 2019. This was followed by their second album, Queen of Hearts, in 2020. Their third studio album, Madness, was released in 2023.

In addition to their original material, the band has released three cover albums: Covers Volume 1, Covers Volume 2, and Covers Volume 3.
