= Ekho (band) =

Israeli heavy metal

- Origin: Tel Aviv, Israel
- Genres: Melodic death metal, power metal
- Years active: 2008–present
- Members: Bar Sanitovsky; Yarden Mor-Avi; Boris Skolyar; Tomshi Shein; Erez Nadler

Ekho is an Israeli death metal band from Ganey Tikva. Formed in 2008, the Group consists of Bar Sanitovsky (vocals, guitar), Yarden Mor-Avi (guitar), (bass), Tomshi Shein (keyboards) and Erez Nadler (drums). The band is considered to be extreme heavy metal. Since the band's formation, they have released one studio album, and two demos.

== History ==
=== Early years (2008–2010) ===
While vocalist and guitarist Bar Sanitovsky started his interest in music as a classical pianist at age 6, Bar's family immigrated to Israel from Germany after World War II, and guitarist Yarden Mor-Avi immigrated from The United States at childhood, the members met at school and at local Heavy Metal shows and slowly gathered, found and identified with one another due to shared interest in Metal music and the Metal scene. Shortly after, the members decided to form a band and as it is told, they looked for a suitable name and eventually settled on the name Ekho, after the voiceless Mountain nymph Echo from Greek mythology. "We heard the name and thought its awesome because we feel that kids today many times dont have their own voice and that people should stop giving a fuck about what other people think and just do what they want."(Magic Fire Music Interview). After the band put out several demos, they released their debut album Spitefull on August 1, 2011.

=== Nymph (2009) ===
Ekho was founded in 2008 by vocalist and guitarist Bar Sanitovsky and guitarist Yarden Mor-Avi. In early 2009, Ekho recorded its first demo, a four track release entitled ‘Nymph’, which was a live-recorded demo tape done in their rehearsal room. The musical direction of the band at this early state is usually described as a form of melodic death metal with thrash metal influences.

=== Among The Shadows of Erebus (2009) ===
In mid-2009, after the release of Nymph, Bar and Yarden began writing material with a new more melodic approach for Ekho's next release, a demo, which was released later that year titled ‘Among The Shadows of Erebus’. In this demo, keyboards, which were used regularly throughout the new songs, were added to Ekho's music and the band's new sound let the keyboards function as an accompaniment for the new focus on guitar melodies and technically intricate solos. The art on the cover of this demo was created by Opal Bechar.

=== Spitefull (2011) ===
A year and a half later, after Among the Shadows of Erebus, the band finished writing and recording new material for its first full-length album, Spitefull, which was released on August 1, 2011. With an integration of demo tracks with new tracks, the band recorded and co-produced the album with Meir Gur at Black Horizon Studios (Natanya, Israel) and mixed it with Ahti Kortelainen at Tico-Tico studio (Kemi, Finland). The album contains seven tracks and features illustrations by the Polish artist Jaroslaw Marcineck in collaboration with tattoo artist Leon Levakov. A music video for "Departure" was released on September 27, 2011. The video was directed and produced by Karin Azulay and Yuval Shuchenacky.

== Musical characteristics and lyrical themes ==
Ekho's music consists of elements from a range of heavy metal genres – melodic death metal, symphonic black metal, power metal, heavy metal, neo-classical metal and progressive metal. Their style has been compared to the earlier work of the Finnish extreme metal band, Children of Bodom, and their music has described as "a blend of Scandinavian influenced fast paced melodic metal with neo-classical metal and heavy metal." During the band's demo period, Ekho wrote about scenarios and emotions from their lives mainly through mythological, epic and atmospheric metaphors.

== Band members ==
=== Current members ===
- Bar Sanitovsky – vocals, guitars (2008–2012)
- Yarden Mor-Avi – guitars, backing vocals (2008–2012)
- Tomshi Shein – keyboards (2008–2012)
- Erez Nadler – drums, percussion (2008–2012)

== Discography ==
=== Studio albums ===
- Spitefull 2011

=== Demos ===
- Nymph (2009)
  1. "Refined Macabre"
  2. "Obliterate"
  3. "Eye For An Eye"
  4. "Nymph"
- Among The Shadows of Erebus (2009)
  1. "Among The Shadows of Erebus"
  2. "Waters of Abyss"
  3. "Silent Mourning"
  4. "Across"
