= Silent Theory =

American nu metal band

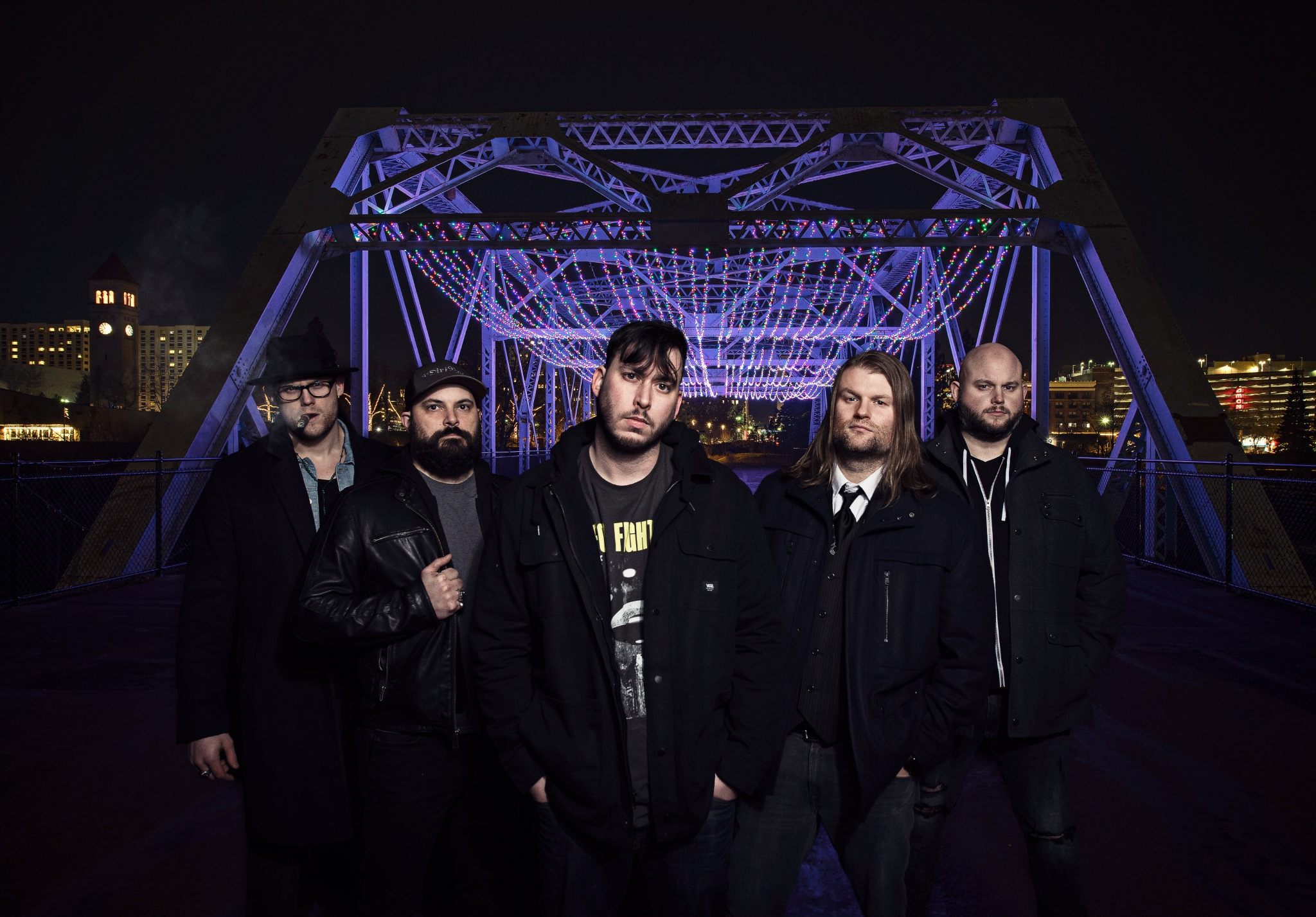
- The band in 2021

Background information
- Origin: Moscow, Idaho, United States
- Genres: Nu metal; hard rock
- Years active: 2010–present
- Labels: Paul Crosby Management, oneRPM
- Members: Mitch Swanger; Bob James; Scott Swanger; George Swanger; Dakota Jerns
- Past members: Nick Osborn; Sean Walker
- Website: www.silenttheory.com

Silent Theory is an American rock band from Moscow, Idaho, United States. It was founded in 2010 by drummer Mitch Swanger and lead vocalist Nick Osborn before adding rhythm guitarist Bob James and Swanger's brothers, lead guitarist Scott and bassist George. Nick Osborn left the band in 2012, and in 2014, Dakota Jerns joined them as the lead vocalist.

== Background ==
The band was signed to Turkey Vulture Records in 2010, where they recorded and released their debut album, Black Tie Affair, in 2011. Following the national tour after the album's release, Nick Osborn left the band to pursue other opportunities, and the rest left the label to go fully independent. In 2013, the band recruited singer Sean Walker from Seattle, Washington, and the band recorded their only single with Sean, "Outta My Head". Sean left the band to pursue other musical interests, which left the band at a standstill. In 2014, through mutual friends, the band was introduced to vocalist Dakota Jerns.

The band found recognition when the lead single song of Delusions, "Fragile Minds", charted both on radio and YouTube, becoming the band's first video to reach over 1,000,000 views. In 2021, the band signed with Paul Crosby Management, owned by Paul Crosby, the former drummer of the band Saliva.

== Discography ==
Studio albums

- Black Tie Affair (2011)
- Delusions (2016)
- Hunt or Be Hunted (2021)
- Tell Us How It Ends (2024)

EPs

- Theoretically Speaking (2022)
- For What It's Worth (2023)
- Theoretically Speaking II (2024)
- Theoretically Speaking III (2025)

== Recognition ==
Silent Theory's single "Fragile Minds" charted at 97 on the Mediabase Active-Rock radio and 29 on Under the Radar in 2016. "Watch Me Burn" charted at number 67 on Media Base Active-Rock radio in 2018, while "Shaking Cages" charted at number 22 on Billboard/BDS radio and 6 on Foundations in 2021. Their song "The Price" was at number 44 on Mediabase Active-Rock radio, 47 on Billboard/BDS, and 41 on BDS/Indicator, and another song, "Flicker", was at number 42 on BDS Indicator and number 29 on Foundations in 2021.

They also received the Band of the Year award from Krave Radio in 2016 and the Up-and-Coming Band of 2016 from 94.1 KMFL in 2017. Their song "Fragile Minds" ranked number 1 for Valley FM 89.5 Top Indie Tracks in 2016 and was also Lou Brutus MP3 Player Song Pick on HardDrive Radio in 2016. Rockin the Dark became the New Music Poll Winner on radio 94.1 KMFL in 2016. "Leave Alone", another song from the band, ranked number 1 on Best Metal Song of 2017 on radio Z 98.
