= Fatter Than Albert =

New Orleans Ska-Punk band

Fatter Than Albert is an American punk and ska-punk band formed in January 2004 and based in New Orleans, Louisiana. The band became known for combining punk rock energy with brass-driven ska influences and was active primarily through the 2000s. Members later helped found the independent DIY label Community Records, which released music by a number of underground punk and ska acts.

== History ==
Fatter Than Albert formed in 2004 in the New Orleans music scene, blending punk rock with ska and jazz-inflected horn parts. Their live performances drew on these interwoven styles, and they developed a local following.

The band released several recordings, such as the 2006 album Erin's Runaway Imagination and their 2008 album The Last Minute, which are characterized by the band's fusion of ska-punk and other influences. Their 2005 album Most Poets Do features music that would later be included in Erin's Runaway Imagination.

In addition to their own releases, Fatter Than Albert contributed tracks to compilations produced by Community Records, the DIY label co-founded by band members.

== Musical style ==
The band's sound drew from punk rock, ska, and jazz traditions, incorporating trumpet, trombone, and saxophone alongside guitar, bass, and drums. Trombonist and Vocalist Daniel 'D-Ray' Ray described their style as a mixture of "Gypsy, reggae, and punk".

== Members ==
=== Notable lineup ===
- Michael Volpi – lead vocals
- Charlie McInnis – saxophone, vocals
- Daniel 'D-Ray' Ray – trombone, keyboards, vocals
- Greg Rodrigue – bass
- Hunter F. Miller – guitar
- Jon Bourgeous – drums

Members of the group later helped establish Community Records.

== Discography ==
=== Albums ===
- Most Poets Do (2005)
- Erin's Runaway Imagination (2006)
- The Last Minute (2008)

=== Compilation contributions ===
- "The Great Reverse" on Community Records Compilation Vol. 1 (2008)
- "27s Part.1" and "Spitting Contest" on Community Records Compilation Vol. 2 (2009)

== Legacy ==
Fatter Than Albert is recognized within the underground punk and ska community for its genre-blending approach and role in Community Records. Their last album release was The Last Minute in 2008, but they continue to play shows periodically.
