= Catch Your Breath (band) =

American rock band

- Origin: Austin, Texas, U.S.
- Genres: Alternative rock; post-hardcore; hard rock; metalcore
- Years active: 2017–present
- Labels: InVogue; Thriller
- Members: Josh Mowery; Teddy Herrera; Cianan Madigan; Onell Hernandez
- Website: catchyourbreathband.com

Catch Your Breath is an American rock band based in Austin, Texas.

The band was founded in 2017, releasing their debut single "Burn" that year. They had a breakthrough in 2022 with their singles "Shame on Me" and "Dial Tone", the latter reaching 7th on the Billboard Hot Hard Rock. In October 2023, they released their debut studio album, also titled Shame on Me Produced by Curt Martin, via Thriller Records.

== Band members ==
- Josh Mowery – lead vocals
- Teddy Herrera – guitars
- Cianan Madigan – bass
- Onell Hernandez – drums

== Discography ==
=== Albums ===
- Shame on Me (2023)
- Not Broken Enough (2026)

=== Singles ===
List of singles as lead artist, showing year released and album name
Title	Year	Peak chart positions				Album
Title	Year	US Hot Hard Rock	US Main. Rock	US Hard Rock Digi.	Certifications	Album
"Frontline"	2017	—	—	—		Non-album singles
"Burn"	2017	—	—	—		Non-album singles
"Yesterday"	2018	—	—	—		Non-album singles
"Fade"	2019	—	—	—		Non-album singles
"Ricochet"	2020	—	—	—		Non-album singles
"Criminal"	2020	—	—	—		Non-album singles
"Blood In the Water"	2021	—	—	—		Non-album singles
"Shame on Me"	2021	14	—	—	● RIAA: Gold	Shame on Me
"Dial Tone"	2022	7	28	9	● RIAA: Gold	Shame on Me
"Savages"	2023	—	—	—		Shame on Me
"No Evil"	2023	—	—	—		Shame on Me
"21 Gun Salute"	2023	—	—	—		Shame on Me
"Y.S.K.W. (You Should Know Why)"	2023	—	—	—		Shame on Me
"Mirror" (with Ekoh)	2023	—	—	—		Shame on Me
"Perfect World" (feat. Ryan Oakes)	2024	—	—	—		Shame On Me (Deluxe Edition)
"Ghost Inside the Shell"	2024	—	—	—		Shame On Me (Deluxe Edition)
"Dark"	2025	—	34	—		Not Broken Enough
"Lost"	2026	—	—	—		Not Broken Enough
"Pretty When You Break" (with Ekoh)	2026	—	—	—		Non-album single
"Blood Money"	2026	—	—	—		Not Broken Enough
"[Gen]inside" (feat. Kami Kehoe)	2026	—	—	—		Not Broken Enough
"Control"	2026	—	—	—		Not Broken Enough
"Novocaine" (with If Not For Me)	2026	—	—	—		Where the Light Begins to Fade
"Rewind"	2026	—	—	—		Not Broken Enough
"Red Alert"	2026	—	34	—		Not Broken Enough

=== Music videos ===
Year	Song	Director(s)
"Frontline"	2017	Jeremy Brookover
"Yesterday"	2018	Ever17 Studios
"Criminal"	2019	Bad Mantra
"Shame on Me"	2021	Unknown
"Dial Tone"	2022	Mason Wright
"No Evil"	2023	Unknown
"Dark"	2025	Alex Kouvastos
"Pretty When You Break"	2026	Unknown
"Blood Money"	2026	Alex Kouvastos
"[Gen]inside"	2026	Alex Kouvastos
"Red Alert"	2026	Alex Kouvastos
