= List of melodic hardcore bands =

The following is a list of notable melodic hardcore bands. Melodic hardcore is a subgenre of hardcore punk with a strong emphasis on melody in its guitar work.

- 7 Seconds
- 88 Fingers Louie
- Acres
- AFI
- Alexisonfire
- American Nightmare
- Anxious
- Atlas Losing Grip
- Avail
- Authority Zero
- Bad Religion
- Bastions
- Beartooth
- Being as an Ocean
- Belvedere
- Blood Youth
- The Carrier
- Casey
- Casey Jones
- Champion
- Climates
- Comeback Kid
- Consumed
- Conveyer
- Counterparts
- CPM 22
- Crime in Stereo
- Crooks
- Crown of Thornz
- Daggermouth
- Dag Nasty
- Dead Swans
- Defeater
- Descendents
- Dragged Under
- Energy
- Evergreen Terrace
- Farside
- The Flatliners
- Funeral Oration
- Gideon
- The Ghost Inside
- Goodtime Boys
- Good Riddance
- H2O
- Have Heart
- Heart in Hand
- Hindsights
- The Hope Conspiracy
- Hundredth
- Ignite
- It Prevails
- Kid Dynamite
- Killing the Dream
- Koyo
- Landscapes
- Latterman
- Leatherface
- Life in Your Way
- Lifetime
- Modern Error
- Modern Life Is War
- More Than Life
- Much the Same
- Napoleon
- No Bragging Rights
- No Use for a Name
- None More Black
- One Step Closer
- Our Time Down Here
- Paint It Black
- PEARS
- Pennywise
- Phinius Gage
- Pianos Become the Teeth
- Propagandhi
- Rise Against
- Ruiner
- Saints Never Surrender
- Sinking Ships
- Smoke or Fire
- Stick to Your Guns
- Story of the Year
- Strike Anywhere
- Strung Out
- Sum 41
- Svalbard
- This Is Hell
- Title Fight
- Touché Amoré
- Trash Boat
- Trophy Eyes
- Vanna
- Verse
- We Never Learned to Live
- While She Sleeps
- The White Noise
- A Wilhelm Scream
