= Capsize (band) =

American hardcore punk band

- Origin: San Diego, California, U.S.
- Genres: Melodic hardcore; emo; post-hardcore
- Years active: 2008–2019, 2022–present
- Label: Equal Vision
- Members: Daniel Wand; Andrew Tamayo
- Past members: Nick Lopez; James Kenney; Ryan Knowles

Capsize is an American melodic hardcore band from San Diego, California.

== History ==
Capsize released their first full-length album, Set Sail, in 2010.

In 2014 Equal Vision Records signed Capsize and they released their second full-length album, titled The Angst In My Veins. Music videos were made for the songs "Linger", "Pale", "The Angst In My Veins" and "Calming, Crippling"

In 2015 they headlined a tour with To The Wind and Exalt. They also made a U.S. and European Tour with Senses Fail and Silverstein.

In 2016, Capsize released their third full-length album titled A Reintroduction: The Essence of All That Surrounds Me. Music videos were made for "XX (Sew My Eyes)", "Tear Me Apart""Favorite Secret" and "The Same Pain"

That year they went on several tours with bands like Being as an Ocean, More To Monroe and Vanna. They also take part on the So What?! Music Festival and the Foundation Fest headlined by Atreyu.

In 2018 they lined up a West Coast run with Thousand Below and Dead Lakes.

In 2019, Daniel Wand and Nick Lopez of Capsize were accused of sexual misconduct allegations, including sexually propositioning underage girls. This caused the band to cancel their European tour and drop off their upcoming tour with Blessthefall. Following the allegations against Wand and Lopez, the band deleted both their Facebook and Twitter accounts and subsequently broke up.

On September 16, 2022, Capsize released their first song in 4 years, "Fading Face".

== Musical style ==
Critics have categorized Capsize's music as melodic hardcore, emo, post-hardcore and metalcore.

Capsize's earliest influences was Defeater, Dead Swans, Landscapes, More Than Life, Killing the Dream, the Carrier and Comeback Kid. For A Reintroduction: The Essence of All That Surrounds Me, they began being more influenced by 2000s post-hardcore, including Underoath, From First to Last, the Used, Emarosa, Thursday and Armor for Sleep.
