= Letters Home (Defeater album) =

Studio album by Defeater
- Released: July 16, 2013
- Recorded: February–April 2013
- Genre: Melodic hardcore
- Length: 34:10
- Label: Bridge 9 (B9R188)

Defeater chronology
Empty Days & Sleepless Nights (2011)	Letters Home (2013)	Abandoned (2015)

Letters Home is the third studio album by American melodic hardcore band Defeater. Like their previous releases, Letters Home is a concept album, following the story of the father of the characters from these releases prior to the events of Travels.

== Reception ==
Professional ratings
Aggregate scores
Source	Rating
Metacritic	81/100
Review scores
Source	Rating
AllMusic	3/5 stars
Exclaim!	7/10
Punknews.org	4/5 stars
Sputnikmusic	3.5/5

Letters Home received positive reviews from critics. On Metacritic, the album holds a score 81/100 based on 8 reviews, indicating "universal acclaim".

== Track listing ==
No.	Title	Length
1.	"Bastards"	2:37
2.	"No Shame"	3:32
3.	"Hopeless Again"	3:13
4.	"Blood in My Veins"	3:28
5.	"No Relief" (featuring George Hirsch of Blacklisted)	2:29
6.	"No Faith"	2:31
7.	"Dead Set"	3:07
8.	"No Saviour"	3:57
9.	"Rabbit Foot"	2:45
10.	"Bled Out"	6:33

== Personnel ==
Defeater

- Derek Archambault
- Joe Longobardi
- Jay Maas
- Mike Poulin
- Jake Woodruff
