= Landscapes (band) =

British melodic hardcore band

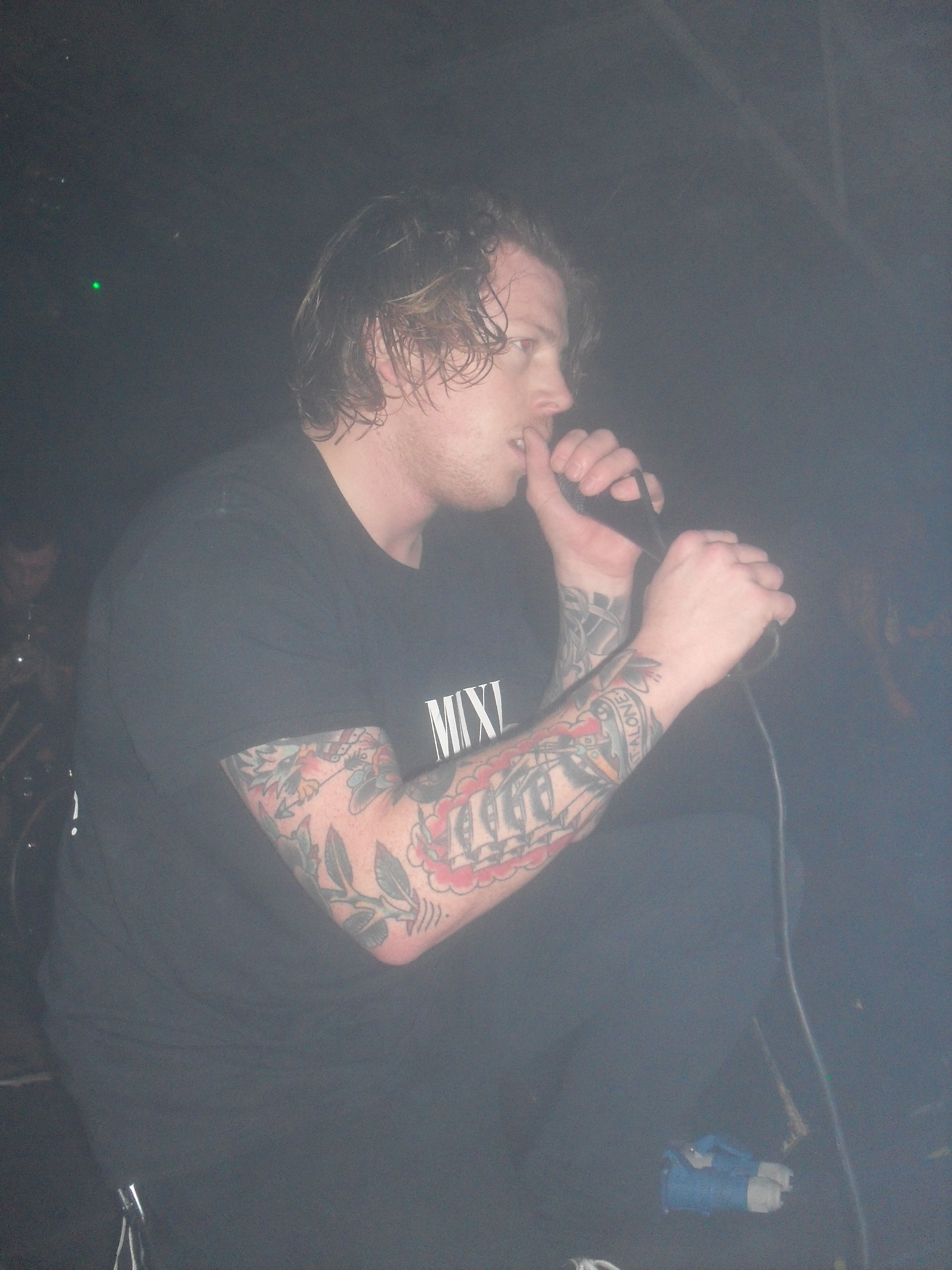
- Shaun Milton of Landscapes in 2014

Background information
- Origin: Somerset, England
- Genres: Melodic hardcore; screamo; emo
- Years active: 2009–2018
- Labels: Broken Night; City of Gold; Pure Noise
- Past members: Shaun Milton; Kai Sheldon; Martin Hutton; Tom Paulton; Jordan Urch; Nick Willcox; Joe Cornish

Landscapes was a British melodic hardcore band based in Somerset, England. Formed in 2009, the band released one EP and two albums. They played at Hevy Music Festival and toured throughout Europe several times.

== History ==
Previously named Counting Days, Landscapes was formed in Somerset, England, in late 2009 by Shaun Milton (vocals), Martin Hutton (guitar), Kai Sheldon (previously drums, later guitar), Nick Willcox (bass guitar), and Joe Cornish (guitar). They released the EP Reminiscence via Broken Night Records in May 2010. In July 2012, they published their debut full-length album, Life Gone Wrong, originally on City of Gold Records. The first pressing sold out, and in September 2013, it was re-released after the band signed to Pure Noise Records, based in San Francisco, which released the record worldwide.

The band played at Hevy Music Festival in Kent on 4 August 2012, where they performed on the Red Bull Bedroom Jam Stage, alongside Brutality Will Prevail and Eisberg. Landscapes was the supporting band for Stray from the Path and The Ghost Inside on the Rock Sound Impericon Exposure Tour throughout the UK, which consisted of six concert dates between 18 and 23 February 2013. Together with Australian melodic hardcore band In Hearts Wake, Landscapes played a whole European tour as support for the Amity Affliction. The tour was named Brothers in Arms Tour and went through Germany, Austria, the UK, Belgium, and France. The band started a second European concert tour as support for Defeater in January 2014. Before that tour started, Landscapes played four headliner shows in Dresden, Bielefeld, Frankfurt, and Göttingen.

Landscapes supported the Used on their UK tour in February 2015.

They released their second album, Modern Earth, on 8 April 2016, via Californian label Pure Noise Records.

In January 2018, Landscapes deleted their Instagram and Facebook accounts and added to their Twitter bio: "Was a hardcore punk rock band, now dead. 2010–2018 RIP."

== Musical style ==
Critics have categorised Landscapes' music as melodic hardcore, emotional hardcore, and screamo. In a 2012 interview, Milton expressed dislike for being called a melodic hardcore band. Instead, in a 2016 interview, he self-identified Landscapes as screamo.

Sebastian Berning of the German online music magazine Powermetal.de has described the music of Landscapes as "dark-lyriced melodic hardcore" and compared the group to Dead Swans, the Carrier, and Killing the Dream. The British magazine Rock Sound wrote that the band was influenced by the post-rock genre. Before Modern Earth, Milton developed laryngitis, leading his vocal therapist to advise him against screaming so often. Because of this Modern Earth featured an increased amount of clean vocals.

They have cited such influences as Verse, Have Heart, Caspian, Tom Waits, the Cure, Morrissey, Pissed Jeans, Man Overboard, Modern Life Is War, and Björk.

They have been cited as an influence by Casey, Holding Absence, and Capsize.

== Band members ==
- Shaun Milton – vocals
- Kai Sheldon – guitar
- Martin Hutton – guitar
- Tom Paulton – bass
- Jordan Urch – drums
- Nick Willcox – bass
- Joe Cornish – guitar

== Discography ==
=== Studio albums ===
- Life Gone Wrong (2012)
- Modern Earth (2016)

=== EPs ===
- Reminiscence (2010)
