= Abandoned (album) =

Studio album by Defeater
- Released: August 28, 2015
- Recorded: October 2014–February 2015
- Genre: Melodic hardcore
- Length: 33:30
- Label: Epitaph, Bridge 9
- Producer: Defeater

Defeater chronology
Letters Home (2013)	Abandoned (2015)	Defeater (2019)

Abandoned is the fourth studio album by American melodic hardcore band Defeater. Abandoned is a concept album, following the story of the Catholic priest in the song "Cowardice" from Travels. This album is Defeater's first release with Epitaph Records. They went on tour in support of the album, supported by Four Year Strong, Expire, Superheaven, Speak Low If You Speak Love, My Iron Lung, and Elder Brother. Derek Archambault was quoted, "[Abandoned] is the overall way that this character feels, be it by this god that he never really believed in, but took a leap for, to pay back this man that saved his life, or be it self-inflicted, where he leaves the woman he loves but takes it out on himself emotionally and through drug abuse. The title itself is the overall feeling of the record." Abandoned was written and recorded after Archambault underwent hip surgery. Archambault used the time to "redouble his connection with his own writing, leaving him clear to truly inhabit what he calls his own Glass family—after the famous J.D. Salinger characters."

== Reception ==
Professional ratings
Aggregate scores
Source	Rating
Metacritic	79/100
Review scores
Source	Rating
AllMusic	3/5 stars
Exclaim!	7/10
PopMatters	7/10 stars
Punknews.org	4/5 stars

Abandoned received positive reviews from critics. On Metacritic, the album holds a score of 79/100 based on 7 reviews, indicating "generally favorable reviews".

== Track listing ==
No.	Title	Length
1.	"Contrition"	2:58
2.	"Unanswered"	2:31
3.	"December 1943"	2:54
4.	"Spared in Hell"	2:01
5.	"Divination"	3:29
6.	"Borrowed & Blue" (featuring James Carroll of Make Do and Mend)	3:27
7.	"Penance"	2:38
8.	"Remorse"	3:08
9.	"Pillar of Salt"	2:17
10.	"Atonement"	3:29
11.	"Vice & Regret"	4:32
Total length:		33:30

Deluxe Edition
No.	Title	Length
12.	"Still & True"	2:57
13.	"Let Me Down"	4:03
Total length:		40:30

== Personnel ==
=== Defeater ===
- Derek Archambault – lead vocals
- Jay Maas – guitar, backing vocals
- Jake Woodruff – guitar
- Mike Poulin – bass
- Joe Longobardi – drums

=== Production ===
- Jay Maas – recording, mixing at Getaway Recording Studios
- Brad Boatright – mastering at Audio Siege
- Daniel Florez – additional engineering
- Michael Winters, Alyssa Archambault – photography
- Derek Archambault, Alyssa Archambault, Michael Winters – art direction
- Jason Link – design
