= Empty Days & Sleepless Nights =

Studio album by Defeater
- Released: March 8, 2011
- Recorded: 2010
- Genre: Melodic hardcore, post-hardcore acoustic
- Length: 49:34
- Label: Bridge 9 (BR9144)
- Producer: Jay Maas

Defeater chronology
| Lost Ground (EP) (2009) | Empty Days & Sleepless Nights (2011) | Letters Home (2013) |

Professional ratings
Review scores
| Source | Rating |
|---|---|
| AbsolutePunk | (90%) |
| Alternative Press | 4/5 stars |
| Rock Sound | (9/10) |
| Sputnikmusic | (3.5/5) |

Empty Days & Sleepless Nights is the second studio album by the American melodic hardcore band Defeater. The album was released on March 8, 2011, through Bridge Nine Records. It was recorded at guitarist Jay Maas' Getaway Recording Studios in Wakefield, Massachusetts.

== Background ==
Though bassist Mike Poulin was a member of the band at the time, bass on the record was contributed by former guitarist Gus Pesce and Jay Maas. The album is split into two parts; the first, Empty Days, showcases the band's usual melodic/post-hardcore style, while the second, Sleepless Nights consists of 4 acoustic tracks. Like Defeater's other records, it is a concept album, following the story of a different character from the plot outline first presented in Travels.

== Track listing ==
Empty Days

1. "Warm Blood Rush" – 2:28
2. "Dear Father" – 2:51
3. "Waves Crash, Clouds Roll" – 2:39
4. "Empty Glass" – 3:31
5. "No Kind of Home" – 2:37
6. "White Knuckles" – 2:10
7. "Cemetery Walls" – 3:31
8. "Quiet the Longing" – 3:54
9. "At Peace" – 3:16
10. "White Oak Doors" – 7:00

Sleepless Nights

1. "But Breathing" – 3:40
2. "Brothers" – 5:05
3. "I Don't Mind" – 3:48
4. "Headstone" – 2:58

== Personnel ==
Defeater

- Derek Archambault – vocals
- Jay Maas – guitars, additional bass, vocals
- Andy Reitz – drums
- Jake Woodruff – guitars

Additional musicians

- Gus Pesce – bass
- Bob Mallory – cello on "Brothers"
- Eli Cohn – violin on "Brothers"
- Cal Joss – pedal steel on "But Breathing", "Brothers" and "I Don't Mind"

Production

- Jay Maas – recording, mixing, mastering
- Michael Winters – photography
- Chris Wrenn – layout, design
- Steve Minerva – scratch board art
