= Casey (band) =

UK musical group

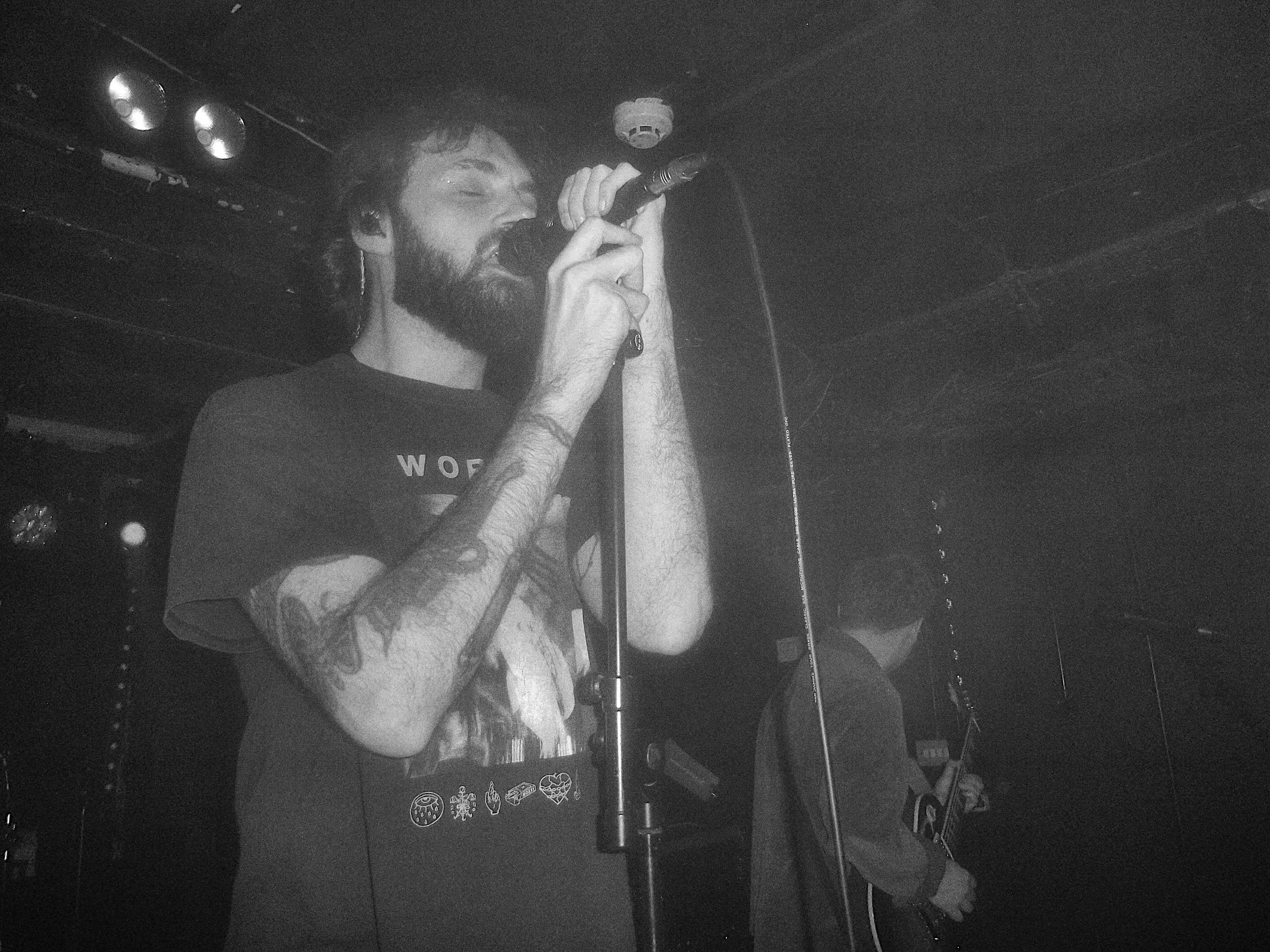
- Casey performing live in 2026

Background information
- Also known as: Well Wisher (2014)
- Origin: South Wales, UK
- Genres: Post-hardcore; dreamcore; melodic hardcore; emo
- Years active: 2014–2019, 2022–present
- Labels: Hassle; Rise
- Spinoff of: Continents; Hot Damn
- Members: Tom Weaver; Toby Evans; Adam Smith
- Past members: Scott Edwards; Liam Torrance; Max Nicolai
- Website: abandcalledcasey.com

Casey are a Welsh rock band from South Wales, United Kingdom. Formed in 2014, under the name Well Wisher, the band began as a studio only project by Tom Weaver and Liam Torrance, before expanding into a live performing quintet playing a style of emotional and dynamic music based in hardcore punk, shoegaze and post-rock. Following the release of two studio albums and two EPs, the band disbanded in 2019, however reformed at the end of 2022. Their third studio album How to Disappear was released on 13 January 2024. The band's current lineup consists of Tom Weaver (vocals), Toby Evans (guitar) and Adam Smith (bass).

== History ==
=== Formation, Haze (You Buried it) and Fade (2014–2015) ===
Following his departure from Continents, Tom Weaver was approached by Liam Torrance, formerly the guitarist of Hot Damn, to begin a new project. At this point, Weaver had become disheartened by touring, leading to him declining the offer until Torrance suggested the band be solely studio based, refraining from playing live. The duo then entered the studio, writing four songs, and soon rekindling their want to perform live. Because of this, they enlisted additional guitarist Toby Evans, drummer Max Nicolai and bassist Scott Edwards and took the name Well Wisher. On 18 May 2014, they self-released the two track EP Haze (You Buried It). Following their second live performance, Well Wisher went on a brief hiatus as Weaver auditioned for the vacant vocalist spot in Northlane, at Torrance's suggestion. Once Northlane's new vocalist was instead announced as Marcus Bridge, Well Wisher's hiatus ended.

On 1 December 2014, Well Wisher changed their name to Casey, under pressure from another UK band using the name Well Wisher. The name Casey was derived from both Weaver's love of the album Casey by the Rise of Science, as well as Torrance's tribute to the late Hawthorne Heights guitarist, Casey Calvert. In April 2015, the band supported Burning Down Alaska alongside Acres. Following this tour, Edwards departed from the group and was replaced by Adam Smith. On 1 May 2015, they self-released their second EP Fade. The EP gained the attention of Hassle Records, who soon signed the band. Between 17 and 23 May 2015, they toured the UK supporting Capsize alongside '68.

=== Love is Not Enough and Where I Go When I Am Sleeping (2016–2019) ===
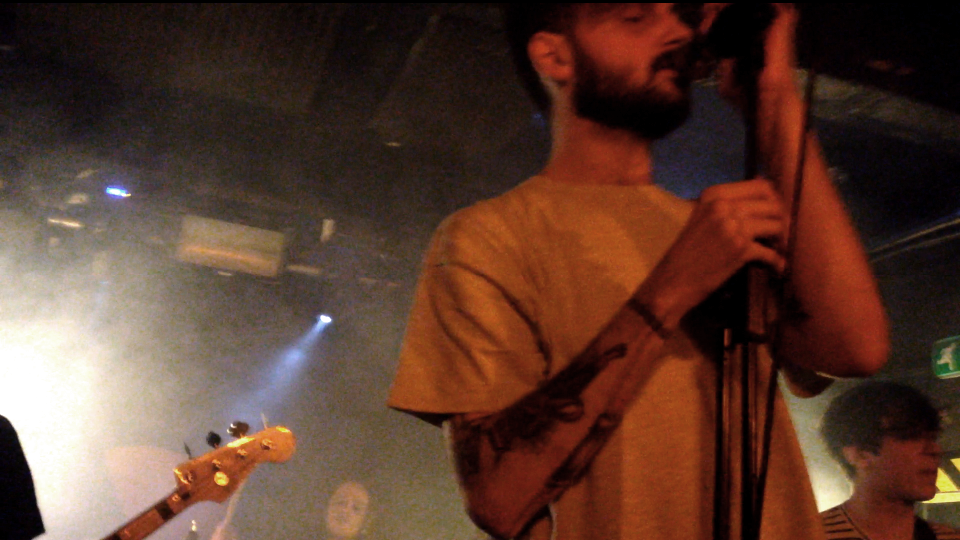
Casey performing live in 2018

On 29 February 2016, the band's single "Darling" was premiered on Huw Stephens's show on BBC Radio 1, being officially released alongside a music video on 6 March. This came with the announcement of the release of the four track EP Darling, only available on vinyl during the band's mainland Europe tour supporting Burning Down Alaska between 4 and 26 March. On 13 July, they announced the release of their debut album Love is Not Enough through Hassle Records, which would also include the single "Darling". During summer 2016, the band cancelled a number of tour dates following Weaver suffering a flare up of Bell's palsy. They released the album's song "Haze" as a single on 5 September before the album was officially on 23 September 2016. To support the album, the band embarked on a UK headline tour between 22 and 25 September. Between 7 and 12 November, they supported Being as an Ocean on their UK headline tour, alongside Burning Down Alaska and Capsize. On 21 August 2017, Love is Not Enough's song "Ceremony" was released as a single, and on 19 April 2017, the album's song "Little Bird" was released a single. Between 17 and 27 April, they toured Europe as a part of the Impericon tour alongside Thy Art is Murder, Miss May I and Being as an Ocean.

On 4 December 2017, the band released the single "Fluorescents" and announced the release of their second album through Rise Records. The album was originally announced to be titled This Routine is Hell, a reference to the Dutch post-hardcore band of the same name, however it was soon changed to Where I Go When I Am Sleeping. Between 5 and 13 December, they toured the UK as a part of the Kerrang! tour, headlined by the Amity Affliction and also featuring Boston Manor and Vukovi. The album's second single "Phosphenes" was then released on 30 January 2018, followed by "Bruise" on 27 February. Where I Go When I Am Sleeping was officially released on 16 March 2018, and was supported by a UK headline tour in March and April, supported by Endless Heights and Rarity. Between 6 and 15 July 2018, they headlined an Australian tour with support from Stateside. On 1 December 2018 the band released a statement explaining that they had decided to disband following a final UK and European tour and a one-off headline show in the US in 2019.

=== Post-breakup and reformation (2020–present) ===
In the years following Casey's disbandment, Smith formed the bands Asidhara and Mourn, which was with members of Continents and Wilderness, and released their debut single on 5 August 2021, while Nicolai and Torrance formed Exit Dream alongside vocalist Wesley Thompson, formerly of Napoleon and Climates, and session musician Rob Hawkins. During this time, Nicolai also became the drummer for Mouth Culture and Evans would sometimes perform as a live member for Holding Absence.

On 1 December 2022, the band announced that they had reformed and that they had booked five tour date in the United Kingdom and mainland Europe between 12 and 20 January 2023. After every one of the dates sold out, they announced on 11 December that had booked additional dates in London and Oberhausen and upgraded the date in Manchester. In a January 2023 interview with Clash magazine, Weaver explained the reunion came about when Torrance contacted him about reforming only days after his split from his fiancée, which Torrance was unaware of. In the following weeks, the band's final lineup then began to meet one another, and soon began writing again. On 6 December 2022, they released the single "Great Grief", the first song written as a band following their reunion, which was followed on 3 January 2023, by the single "Atone". On 15 September, they released the single "Puncture Wounds To Heaven", and announced it would be a part of the upcoming third studio album. Between 19 September and 1 October, they headlined a tour of the United States On 26 October, they released the single "How to Disappear", and announced the release of their studio album of the same name, which was eventually released on 12 January 2024. The album's third single was "Bite Through My Tongue" was released on 30 November. Between 26 March and 14 April 2024, they will tour the United Kingdom and mainland Europe in support of the album. The band toured North American alongside Holding Absence in January 2024. This was followed by a UK and European tour in March and April, which included several appearances at Impericon Festival.

On 22 September 2025, Torrance announced his decision to leave the band to focus on his family. On 9 March 2026, Nicolai confirmed that he had also decided to leave the band towards the end of 2025. Both will rejoin the band as touring members for the Love Is Not Enough 10th anniversary tour between 22 September and 4 October 2026.

== Artistry ==
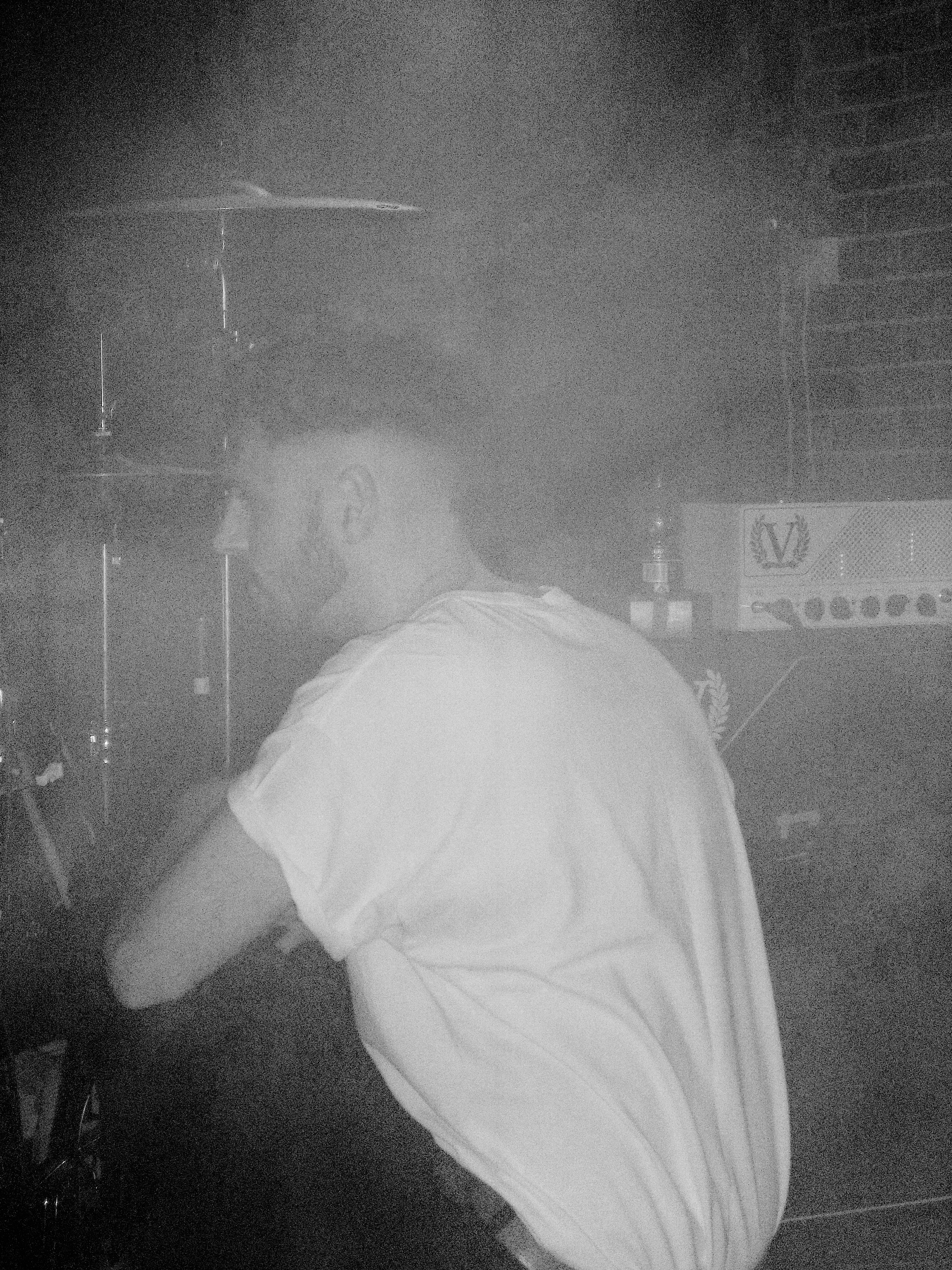
Casey performing live in 2019

=== Musical style ===
Critics have categorised Casey's music as post-hardcore, dreamcore, melodic hardcore, emo and shoegazing. They often make use of elements of post-rock, indie rock, post-metal, hardcore punk and screamo. They were a forefront band in the 2010s dreamcore movement, which was based around the YouTube channel Dreambound, where bands merged screamo and melodic hardcore with post-rock and shoegaze. Their music is experimental and makes use of elements including ambient and spoken word parts. The band's lyrics often discuss the bleaker sides of Weaver's life and health, with Love is not Enough discussing heartbreak, while Where I Go When I Am Sleeping included topics such as his bipolar disorder, ulcerative colitis and osteogenesis imperfecta, as well as his survived heart attack, stroke and car crash.

The BBC called their music at "one moment as atmospheric as 65DaysOfStatic or Explosions In The Sky, the next as fierce and intense as anything in Deftones' back catalogue [sic]". Bring the Noise it as "packed to the rafters with emotionally charged guitar lines and captivating, heartfelt lyrics". Alternative Press called it a "mix of rhythmic atmosphere, spoken word, hardcore guitar and more into the tracks guaranteed to move you and tell you a vivid story.",

=== Influences ===
They have cited influences including Dead Swans, Bastions, Landscapes, Departures, Up River, Pianos Become the Teeth, Touché Amoré, mewithoutYou, La Dispute, Stick to Your Guns, Gatherers, Jonas Brothers, God Is an Astronaut, Circa Survive, Explosions in the Sky, Foo Fighters, This Will Destroy You, Caspian, Motion City Soundtrack, Funeral for a Friend, the Blackout, Hondo Maclean, Aiden, Hawthorne Heights, the first two albums by A Day to Remember and Converge. Following their reunion, Weaver would begin writing lyrics influenced by Holding Absence and Silent Planet.

In an interview with Music&Riots, Weaver stated that the band try not to consider genre when writing their music, explaining "if you take 20 second snapshots throughout the record we could just as easily be Comeback Kid as we could Sigur Rós. I think in the internet age the concept of genre is becoming less and less relevant. People are fusing soundscapes in such diverse and dramatic ways that trying to pigeonhole an artist is becoming more difficult than it's ever been. We just make music that we love, if people listen to it and it resonates with them, then the genre is of no consequence".

=== Legacy ===
In a 2024 article, Kerrang! writer Jake Richardson stated that "The influence of bands like Casey on the new breed [of U.K. heavy music] is clear", noting Sleep Token and Holding Absence as two examples. They have been cited as an influence by Lastelle, Delaire the Liar and Normandie.

== Members ==
Current

- Tom Weaver – lead vocals (2014–2019, 2022–present)
- Toby Evans – rhythm guitar, backing vocals (2014–2019, 2022–present)
- Adam Smith – bass (2015–2019, 2022–present)

Former

- Scott Edwards – bass (2014–2015)
- Liam Torrance – lead guitar (2014–2019, 2022–2025; touring only: 2026)
- Max Nicolai – drums (2014–2019, 2022–2025; touring only: 2026)

Touring

- Tom Connolly – drums (2026)

== Discography ==
=== Studio albums ===
- Love Is Not Enough (2016)
- Where I Go When I Am Sleeping (2018)
- How to Disappear (2024)

=== EPs ===
- Haze (You Buried It) (2014)
- Fade (2015)
- Darling (2016)

=== Singles ===
- "Hell" (2015)
- "Teeth" (2015)
- "Fade" (2015)
- "Darling" (2016)
- "Haze" (2016)
- "Ceremony" (2016)
- "Little Bird" (2017)
- "Fluorescents" (2017)
- "Phosphenes" (2018)
- "Bruise" (2018)
- "Great Grief" (2022)
- "Atone" (2023)
- "Puncture Wounds to Heaven" (2023)
- "How to Disappear" (2023)
- "Bite Through My Tongue" (2023)
- "Selah" (2024)
