= Hindsights =

English rock band

- Origin: Maidenhead, Berkshire, U.K.
- Genres: Soft grunge; emo; melodic hardcore; alternative rock
- Years active: 2011–2016
- Labels: Beach Community, Shivery.MMXII., Nowhere Youth, DSTM, Meadowbrook, Don't Shoot the Messenger
- Past members: Benio Baumgart; Billy Hutton; Miles Hay; Jack Perry; Tom Richfield

Hindsights were an English rock band, formed in Maidenhead, Berkshire in 2011. They released their debut demo within a year of formation, following with the extended plays Weathered (2012) and The Thoughts That Weigh Me Down (2013) They began playing music typical of punk rock subgenres such as emo but over time increasingly took influence from alternative rock. They were one of the most prominent emo bands in the United Kingdom of their time. They released their sole studio album, Cold Walls / Cloudy Eyes, in 2015. By the end of the year, they had announced their disbandment. Their final live performance was on 23 January 2016, which was released as The Final Show live album.

== History ==
=== 2011–2013: Formation, Weathered and The Thoughts That Weigh Me Down ===
Hindsights formed in Maidenhead, Berkshire, in 2011, by Benio Baumgart (vocals guitar), Billy Hutton (vocals, guitar), Miles Hay (bass) and Jack Perry (drums), following the disbandment of their previous bands. Its founding lineup were largely from Maidenhead and nearby Burnham, Buckinghamshire, though in a 2014 interview with the Reading Post they named their "hometown" as Reading, Berkshire. The released a demo in 2011.

On 11 June 2012, they released their debut EP Weathered. On 15 November 2012, they released a split EP with New York City band Wester, through Don't Shoot the Messenger Records and Meadowbrook Records. In support of the EP, Hindsights toured the United States' east coast with Wester. On 19 August 2013, they announced they had signed to the record label Beach Community. On 30 September 2013, they premiered their second EP The Thoughts That Weigh Me Down through Punktastic, which was officially released on 7 October. Then, between 11 and 17 of that month, they headlined a tour of Belgium and the UK. On 29 June 2014, they released the single "Grey", featuring Thom Weeks of Gnarwolves.

=== 2014–2015: Cold Walls / Cloudy Eyes ===
On 27 November 2014, they released the single "Cold Walls", announcing it would be a part of their debut album Cold Walls/Cloudy Eyes. On 15 December, they released the single "Pensive". Between 21 and 29 January, they support Milk Teeth on their UK headline tour. On 10 February, they released the single "Cloudy Eyes" and announced a UK headline tour between 21 and 29 of the same month. Their debut album Cold Walls/Cloudy Eyes was premiered through Kerrang! on 16 February. The next day, the band headlined the album's released show at the Garage in London, with support from Creeper and Bad News. The album was officially released on 23 February, and official footage of the release show was uploaded to YouTube on 25 February. On 15 May, they performed at The Great Escape Festival 2015. Between 26 June and 13 July, they toured Europe alongside Prawn and Brightr. Between 27 July and 2 August, they supported Blitz Kids on their UK headline tour, alongside Creeper, Monarks and Verses. On 22 August, they supported Muncie Girls at Kingston venue the Cricketers, alongside Muskets.

On 1 October 2015, they announced the addition of guitarist Tom Richfield to the band's lineup, with Baumgart now taking on only vocal duties. In the statement, they stated that Richfield had been in the band for six months, despite not performing live with the band. At the same time, they revealed the dates for a UK tour between 9 and 31 October. On 8 October, they released their first song featuring Richfield, titled "Wither". On 12 November, they released a music video for "Wither", which was premiered through Kerrang!. Between 23 and 28 November, they co-headlined a tour of the UK alongside Apologies, I have None.

=== Disbandment ===
On 4 December 2015, the band announced that they would be disbanding. On 10 January, they announced their final show would take place on 23 January 2016, at the Boston Music Rooms, with support from Bad News and Landscapes. In a January 2016 interview with Punktastic, Baumgart explained the decision as due to how "We’d done everything we could within the DIY scene, and stretched it as far as it could go", stating the decision was made in less than day. The performance was recorded and officially released as the live album The Final Show on 30 May 2016. This coincided with the release of a 40-page memoir on the band.

Bannister went on to join Milk Teeth as vocalist and guitarist. Baumgart formed post-rock band Sibling, which was originally also going to include Richfield, who instead moved to Japan.

== Musical style and legacy ==
Critics categorised Hindsights' music as soft grunge, emo, melodic hardcore and alternative rock. They incorporated elements of grunge and pop-punk. Hindsights' music often shifted styles between songs, varying from slow, introspective songs to up-tempo punk songs. Their early work was punk, but progressed by leaning further into alternative rock. Following Baumgart's late 2015 move to only vocals, they incorporated elements of pop rock.

Their sounds were based around dynamics particularly through Baumgart's transition from soft sung vocals to voice-cracking shouts. Punktastic writer Ben Tipple said his voice sounded "constantly on the cusp of heartbreak". Their guitars were often modified using effects pedals, particularly fuzz. Punktastic writer Adam Rosario noted their sound as drawing up the defend pop-punk era sound.

The band's earliest influence was Brand New. Soon, they embraced the influence of the bands signed to Run for Cover Records and No Sleep Records, particularly Title Fight. Around 2013, they were also taking influence from Crime in Stereo and Mineral. The members were inspired by post-rock and pop music, however, in a 2016 interview with Already Heard, Baumgart said these influences were often subtle, because "with the live show, we always wanted it to be full of energy".

Hindsights were one of the most prominent UK emo bands of their time, with a Punktastic writer Reece Weatherley stating in 2015 that "it won't be long before these are one of the most sought-after faces in UK emo". A 2018 retrospective article by Noizze writer Dan Hillier stating they were "destined for the big leagues, on par with acts such as Basement, Title Fight and Gnarwolves in terms of magnitude". Noizze noted them as one of the great "Artists Who Only Released One Album". By 2019, Already Heard called them "much missed".

They were cited as a favourite by Milk Teeth.

== Members ==
- Benio Baumgart – vocals (2011–2016), guitar (2011–2015)
- Billy Hutton – guitar, vocals (2011–2016)
- Miles Hay – bass (2011–2016)
- Jack Perry – drums (2011–2016)
- Tom Richfield – guitar (2015-2016)

== Discography ==
Albums

- Cold Walls / Cloudy Eyes (2015)

EPs

- Weathered (2012)
- The Thoughts That Weigh Me Down (2013)

Demos

- Demo 2011 (2011)

Live albums

- The Final Show (2016)
