= Continents (band) =

Welsh metalcore band

- Origin: South Wales, United Kingdom
- Genres: Metalcore
- Years active: 2010–2019; 2022–present
- Label: Victory Records
- Spinoffs: Casey
- Members: Phil Cross; Gareth Hill; Scott Waters; Keiron Dix
- Past members: Tom Weaver; Dom Turner; Duncan "Ken" Hamill; Matthew Reece; Rhys Griffiths; Timothy Vincent; Darryl Sweet
- Website: https://victoryrecords.com/artist/continents/

Continents are a Welsh metalcore band. The band were signed to Victory Records in 2012 before parting ways with the label in 2017 before the release "Preacher", and have toured with acts including The Ghost Inside, Emmure, Comeback Kid, Defeater and All Shall Perish. They returned in 2022 with the single Bad Blood. Continents are known for their high energy live performances which saw the band perform throughout the UK, Europe and Japan. In 2012 the band were featured on the YouTube homepage as a featured band and highlighted by Alternative Press Magazine (US) as one of their top 20 bands to look out for in 2013. Continents announced their return in 2022 with the release of singles 'Bad Blood' and 'Clarity' along with a return to live performances supporting Counterparts at Throw fest 2022. The band entered the studio in late 2022 with new music on the horizon, set to release in early 2023.

== History ==
Formed in 2010, Continents made a name for themselves within the UK music scene. After signing to Victory Records in June 2012 the band departed on a five-country tour in support of their debut album Idle Hands, being released on 23 January 2013, was met with extremely positive reviews. Helen Catchpowle from Rock Sound gave the album 8/10, exclaiming: "Launching into the fray with its tinnitus-inducing title track, Continents' first album sees the Welsh five-piece easily living up to high expectations set by their riotous set at last year's Ghost fest. Fast cementing their place as serious contenders on the UK hardcore scene, the band's apparently limitless energy translates effortlessly into a record that's as raw as it is powerful, with ferocious vocals from frontman Phil Cross leading the relentless onslaught. With lead single powerhouse 'Trails' already attracting an impressive following, Continents' reputation looks set to rocket on the merit of this solid debut effort."

While Rhian Westbury from Bring the Noise UK gave the album a 9/10, stating:

'Pegasus, Pegasus is where the band come into their own, from the opening massive riffs to the closing screams you won't be able to sit still. You might even find yourself jumping up and down and fist pumping in your living room. It's okay, no one's watching!'

During the European tour for the album founding guitarist Tom Weaver was hospitalized with a crushed eye socket. The band's guitar tech Rhys Griffiths filled his role for the remaining dates, then upon discovering Weaver was unable to play guitar for the next six months due to the injury, Weaver departed from the band and Griffiths officially took on guitar duties. Weaver soon formed the studio project Well Wisher, which would eventually morph into the band Casey.

In early 2015, the band announced that they had entered the studio to begin recording their next album, Reprisal and the album was released on Halloween in the same year.

In February 2019, the band announced they would be disbanding, with their final show taking place on 10 April.

"Life Of Misery", a single from the bands sophomore album Reprisal was featured on Ubisoft's Watch Dogs: Legion released in 2020 across all platforms.

Continents announced their return in 2022 with the release of singles 'Bad Blood' and 'Clarity' along with a return to live performances supporting Counterparts at Throw fest 2022.

2023 looks to have the band return to touring regularly with festivals and shows dotting the band's schedule for the year. 2023 looks to also see the band's first full release since 2015's 'Reprisal'. With a shift in musical direction, the band has developed new material that explores a different musical direction.

== Musical style ==
Critics have categorized Continents' music as metalcore. They have cited influences including Counterparts, the Ghost Inside, Architects, Volumes, the Hope Conspiracy, Pantera, Underoath and Slipknot.

== Members ==
Lineup

- Phil Cross – vocals (2010–present)
- Keiron Dix – guitar (2022–present)
- Scott Waters – drums (2017–present)

Former members

- Darryl Sweet – guitar (2010–2024)
- Tom Weaver – guitar (2010–2013)
- Matthew Reece – drums (2010–2011)
- Dom Turner – bass (2010–2017)
- Duncan "Ken" Hamill – drums (2011–2017)
- Rhys Griffiths – guitar, vocals (2013–2019)
- Timothy Vincent – bass (2017–2019)

== Discography ==
=== Studio albums ===
- Idle Hands (2013)
- Reprisal (2015)
- Lifeline (2023)

=== Singles ===
- "Trials" (2011)
- "Idle Hands" (2013)
- "Pegasus, Pegasus!" (2013)
- "Life Of Misery" (2015)
- "Scorn" (2015)
- "Preacher" (2017)
- "Bad Blood" (2022)
- "Clarity" (2022)
- "Lifeline" (2023)
- "Hurricane" (2023)
