= Let Go (Hundredth album) =

Studio album by Hundredth
- Released: September 27, 2011
- Genre: Melodic hardcore
- Length: 48:46
- Label: Mediaskare

Hundredth chronology
When Will We Surrender (2010)	Let Go (2011)	Free (2015)

Professional ratings
Review scores
Source	Rating
Jesus Freak Hideout	4/5 stars

Let Go is the second release by American melodic hardcore band Hundredth. It was released on September 27, 2011, through Mediaskare Records. "Live Today" was the first single from the record, and was released on YouTube on July 22, 2011.

== Critical reception ==
Alternative Press wrote: "Nihilistic statements are eschewed in favor of motivating both themselves and their listeners to stand up and do something about the negativity surrounding them—a message that has typified hardcore for nearly 30 years and remains just as vital." MetalSucks called the album "generic metalcore," writing that "the lack of any real thought makes the record suffer."

== Track listing ==
No.	Title	Length
1.	"Let Go"	0:26
2.	"Weathered Town"	3:16
3.	"Live Today"	3:34
4.	"We Can Take Them All"	3:19
5.	"Carry On"	3:41
6.	"Humane"	3:15
7.	"Remain & Sustain"	3:18
8.	"Monumental Part I"	2:54
9.	"Monumental Part II"	3:05
10.	"I Hold the Key"	3:17
11.	"Restless" (featuring Cody Bonnette of As Cities Burn and Hawkboy)	4:07
12.	"Soul"	8:42
13.	"Hurt" (Nine Inch Nails / Johnny Cash Cover)	4:44
Total length:		48:46

=== Notes ===
1. Track 12 contains an outro excerpt from "There is a Light that Never Goes Out" by The Smiths.

== Personnel ==
Hundredth

- Chadwick Johnson - Vocals
- Alex Blackwell - Lead guitar, Backing vocals
- Andrew Minervini - Rhythm guitar
- J. P. Gressman - Bass
- Matt Koontz - Drums

Production

- Produced by Baron Bodnar, Ryan Leitru & Hundredth
- Engineered by Taylor Voeltz, Chadwick Johnson & Alex Blackwell
- Adaptation by Johnny Cash
- Mixed and Mastered by Will Putney
- Management by Baron Bodnar
- Booking by Cody Delong (The Kenmore Agency, US) & Nanouk De Meijere (Avocado Booking, EU)
- PR by Josh Eldridge
- Artwork by Dan Mountford & John Doe
