= Dear Father (song) =

Single by Defeater

from the album Empty Days & Sleepless Nights
- B-side: "I Don't Mind"
- Released: February 8, 2011
- Genre: Melodic hardcore, acoustic
- Length: 2:51
- Label: Bridge Nine (B9R143)
- Songwriter(s): Derek Archambault, Jay Maas, Mike Poulin, Andy Reitz, Jake Woodruff

"Dear Father" is a single released by the American band Defeater. The song, and its accompanying acoustic B-side "I Don't Mind", are from the group's second studio album Empty Days & Sleepless Nights. The single was released as a 7" vinyl and digital download on February 8, 2011 through Bridge Nine Records.

The song "Dear Father" lyrically touches on the struggles of living in a military family during post-World War II America. During a live performance in Tennessee in 2011, a group of military men in uniform were in the front row singing the song "Dear Father" along with vocalist Derek Archambault with tears streaming down their faces. Guitarist Jay Maas said, "In the middle of the song, one guy took his dog tags off and put them right in Derek's hand and said 'Thank you'. Maas also noted that none of the members of Defeater have any military background. He said, "We're just writing our opinions and what we think it would be like, and it apparently struck a chord with these guys."

== Track listing ==
1. "Dear Father" – 2:51
2. "I Don't Mind" – 3:48

== Personnel ==
Defeater

- Derek Archambault – vocals
- Jay Maas – guitars, vocals
- Mike Poulin – bass
- Andy Reitz – drums
- Jake Woodruff – guitars
