= Stateside =

Stateside may refer to:

- stateside, an informal adjective or adverb meaning "in the United States"
  - Stateside Puerto Ricans
  - Stateside Virgin Islands Americans
- Stateside Records, the British record label
- Stateside (band), an Australian rock band
- "Stateside" (song), by PinkPantheress, 2025
- Stateside, an album by Mel Tillis, or its title track, 1966
- "Stateside", a song by Tin Machine from Tin Machine II, 1991
- Stateside (film), starring Rachael Leigh Cook, 2004

== See also ==
- The Troubled Stateside, an album by Crime In Stereo, 2006
