= Rare (Hundredth album) =

Studio album by Hundredth
- Released: June 16, 2017
- Genre: Shoegaze; alternative rock; dream pop; post-punk; post-hardcore
- Length: 45:07
- Label: Hopeless
- Producer: Sam Pura

Hundredth chronology
Free (2015)	Rare (2017)	Somewhere Nowhere (2020)

Rare (stylized as RARE) is the fourth studio album by American band Hundredth, released on June 16, 2017 on Hopeless Records. The album marks a dramatic departure in the band's sound from the melodic hardcore sound the band was known for since their formation, in favor of a more mellowed-down alt. rock/shoegaze sound, influenced by classic new wave and post-punk acts such as Joy Division and The Smiths, claiming that the current sound was music the band wanted to write and listen to. The album was produced by Sam Pura, who has previously worked with The Story So Far and Forever Came Calling.

On April 26, 2017, the band released the first single off the album – "Neurotic", the band's first new music after changing their musical style. This was followed by the second single "Youth" on May 11, 2017. On May 18, 2017, the band premiered "Suffer" and on May 31, 2017, another new song "Hole" was released.

== Musical style and influences ==
The band's sound on Rare was compared by many to that of contemporary punk and alternative rock bands such as Turnover, Balance and Composure and Nothing, who switched in last years from punk rock/pop punk to shoegazing, though the band dismissed claims that they were influenced by those bands' sound while writing and recording the album. During an interview with Impericon magazine, the band has said that their new direction is the musical direction all the band members always wanted to play and that the band's old melodic hardcore sound didn't represent the band members' own musical tastes. Additionally, the band members said they are not planning on playing any of their old material during live shows, focusing mainly on the current album and current musical style.

Stereogum has compared the album's sound as to that of less-referenced shoegazing acts such as Catherine Wheel, Swervedriver and Hum, borrowing from their mellow indie/alternative, while retaining elements from their past hardcore sound.

== Critical reception ==
Professional ratings
Review scores
Source	Rating
Rock Sound	7/10
Sound Fiction	8.1/10
Exclaim!	6/10
Hysteria Magazine	Positive

Rock Sound gave Rare a score of seven out of 10, while Stereogum included it on their list of the 50 best albums of 2017, at 42.

=== Accolades ===
Publication	Accolade	Rank	Ref.
Stereogum	50 Best Albums of 2017	42	

== Track listing ==
No.	Title	Length
1.	"Vertigo"	3:26
2.	"Neurotic"	3:30
3.	"White Squall"	3:42
4.	"Hole"	3:52
5.	"Suffer"	3:49
6.	"Disarray"	3:34
7.	"Down"	4:05
8.	"Grey"	2:59
9.	"Shy Vein"	3:40
10.	"Chandelier"	3:39
11.	"Youth"	3:28
12.	"Departure"	5:17
Total length:		45:07

== Personnel ==
Hundredth

- Chadwick Glenn Johnson – lead vocals, rhythm guitar, engineer
- Alex Blackwell IV – lead guitar, backing vocals
- Andrew Minervini – bass
- Lee Hutchison – drums, percussion

Production

- Produced by Hundredth and Sam Pura at The Panda Studios, Fremont, CA
- Sam Pura – mixing, engineer
- Brian Gardner – mastering
