= Stay Cold =

EP by Trapped Under Ice
- Released: August 19th, 2008
- Genre: Hardcore punk
- Label: Reaper

Trapped Under Ice chronology
Stay Cold (2008)	Secrets of the World (2009)

Stay Cold is the first EP by Baltimore, Maryland hardcore punk band Trapped Under Ice. It was released in 2008 on Reaper Records.

== Track list ==
No.	Title	Length
1.	"Half a Person"	1:49
2.	"Stay Cold"	1:27
3.	"Skeleton Heads"	1:22
4.	"Street Lights"	2:30
5.	"Brain Waves"	0:46
6.	"Between the Sheets"	1:44
