= Bitter Clarity, Uncommon Grace =

Studio album by Verse
- Released: 17 July 2012
- Genre: Hardcore punk
- Length: 31:30
- Label: Bridge Nine

Verse chronology
Aggression (2008)	Bitter Clarity, Uncommon Grace (2012)

Professional ratings
Review scores
Source	Rating
Rock Sound	9/10 stars
Absolute Punk	8.2/10 stars

Bitter Clarity, Uncommon Grace is the fourth album by American hardcore band Verse. It was released on 17 July 2012 through Bridge Nine.

== Track listing ==
No.	Title	Length
1.	"The Selfish of the Earth"	3:21
2.	"The Selfless of the Earth"	3:50
3.	"The Silver Spoon and the Empty Plate"	1:30
4.	"Setting Fire to the Bridges We Cross"	3:05
5.	"Segue One"	1:01
6.	"You and I Are the Fortunate Ones"	2:36
7.	"The End of All Light"	3:40
8.	"The Relevance of Our Disconnect"	2:35
9.	"Segue Two"	1:34
10.	"Oceanic Tendencies"	1:43
11.	"Finding a Way Out When There Is No Way"	2:57
12.	"Segue Three"	0:49
13.	"The End of All Life"	2:49
Total length:		31:30
