= Big Kiss Goodnight =

Studio album by Trapped Under Ice
- Released: 2011
- Genre: Beatdown hardcore
- Length: 33:35
- Label: Reaper

Trapped Under Ice chronology
Secrets of the World (2009)	Big Kiss Goodnight (2011)	Heatwave (2017)

Professional ratings
Review scores
Source	Rating
Punknews	4/5 stars

Big Kiss Goodnight is the second studio album by Baltimore, Maryland hardcore punk band Trapped Under Ice. It was released in 2011 on Reaper Records.

== Track list ==
No.	Title	Length
1.	"Born to Die"	3:01
2.	"Pleased to Meet You"	2:34
3.	"Jail"	1:45
4.	"Outcast"	2:44
5.	"Victimized"	2:46
6.	"Time Waits"	2:49
7.	"Dead Inside"	1:33
8.	"True Love"	2:21
9.	"Disconnect"	2:48
10.	"Draw the Line"	2:29
11.	"You and I"	2:54
12.	"Still Cold"	1:49
13.	"Reality Unfolds"	4:02

== Personnel ==
Production

- Chad Gilbert – production
- Paul Miner – recording, engineering, mixing, mastering
- Chad Soner – cover
