= Milk Teeth =

British punk rock band

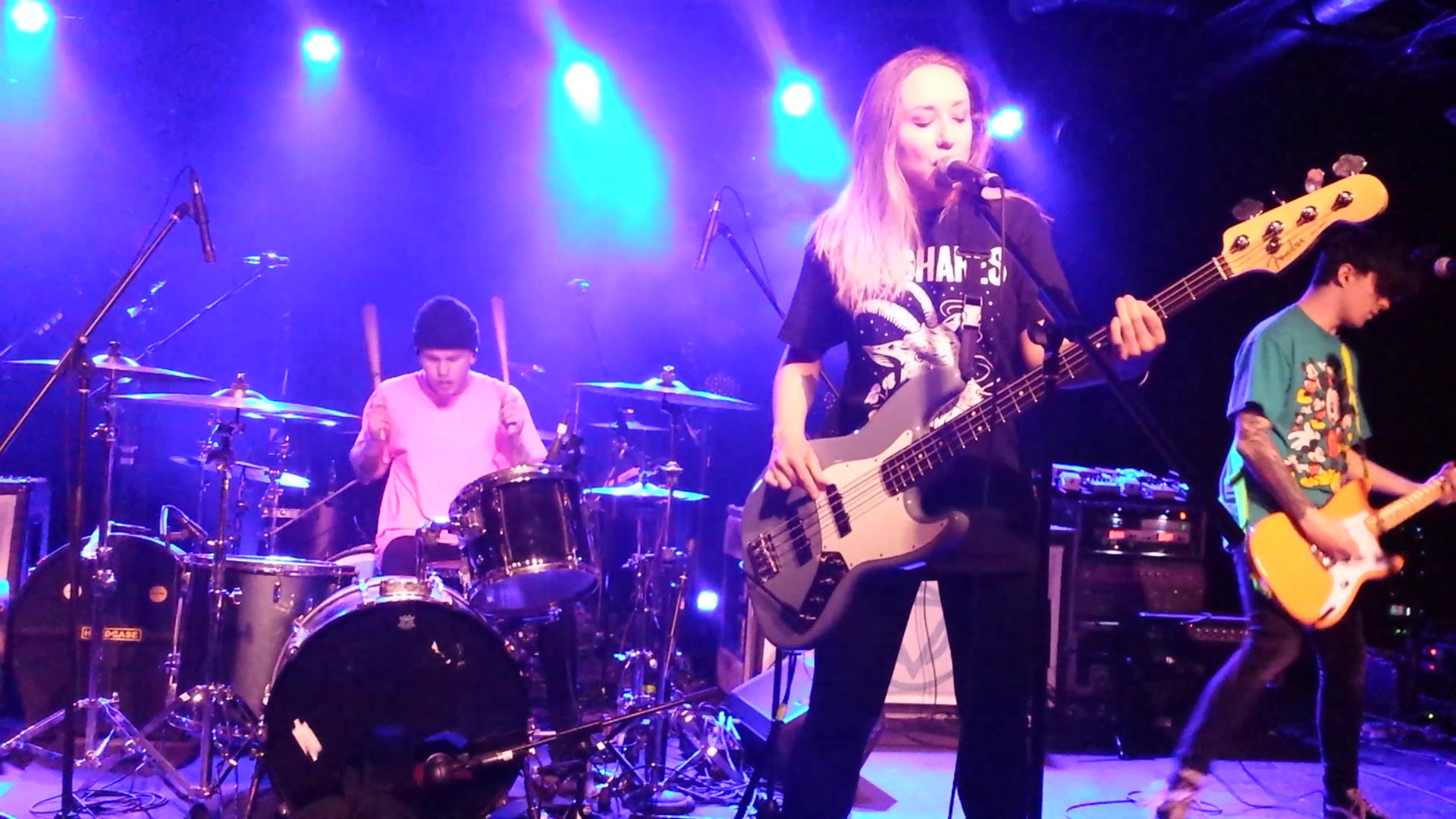
- Milk Teeth in Montreal, Quebec at the Fairmount Theater

Background information
- Origin: Stroud, Gloucestershire, England
- Genres: Punk rock; emo grunge; post-hardcore; grunge
- Years active: 2012–2020
- Labels: Hopeless, Roadrunner, Music For Nations, Venn
- Past members: Josh Bannister; Becky Blomfield; Em Foster; Oli Holbrook; Billy Hutton; Jack Kenny; Chris Webb
- Website: www.milkteethpunx.com

Milk Teeth (often stylised as MILK TEETH) were a British punk rock band from Stroud, Gloucestershire, which formed in May 2013. The band officially announced their breakup on Facebook and Twitter on 4 September 2020.

== History ==
=== Formation and early years ===
Milk Teeth formed in August 2012, in Stroud, Gloucestershire, by Josh Bannister on vocals and guitar and Oli Holbrook on drums, who were friends from college. They took their name from the song "Milk Teeth" by Japanese Voyeurs and as a duo recorded their debut EP Fuck. Soon, they recruited Christopher Webb as guitarist, then Becky Blomfield as bassist and co-vocalist.

Their first live performance was at their college. Wanting to perform live more, and with no venues in Stroud allowing them to play, they contacted their friend Liam Evans, a promoter in Cheltenham. Evans organised their second show at Cheltenham venue 2 Pigs. The members quickly recorded a new set of songs and entered the studio. On 30 May 2013, they released the single "Vanilla". They released the EP Smiling Politely, independently on 6 August 2013.

In 2014, they signed to Venn Records.

The band released their second EP Sad Sack through Venn in April 2015. On 5 January 2016, after they finished recording their debut album, founding member and guitarist/primary songwriter and occasional lead vocalist Josh Bannister left the band and was replaced by former Hindsights member Billy Hutton as a touring guitarist. The band then released their debut album, Vile Child, on 29 January 2016, through Hopeless Records. This was the last of the band's releases to feature Bannister. In April 2016 the band toured the US, supporting Sorority Noise, Citizen and Turnover. In 2017 the band signed to Roadrunner Records and announced a new EP titles Be Nice, which was released in July 2017, followed up by Go Away, another EP released in November 2017.

=== 2018–2020 ===
On 26 June 2018 it was announced via the band's Facebook page that guitarist Chris Webb would be leaving the band "with immediate effect". It was later revealed this was due to allegations of sexual misconduct regarding Chris and an underage fan. Em Foster from Nervus filled in on guitar shortly afterwards. After a number of festival dates, on 19 September 2018, the band announced that Billy Hutton was leaving Milk Teeth and confirmed Foster as a full-time member, resulting in the band becoming a three piece. This lineup played the EP's Be Nice and Go Away in full, on a short tour around the UK in November of that year, preceding the release of a new single; Stain, and a run supporting Enter Shikari during their "Stop The Clocks" tour in December.

Milk Teeth began 2019 by supporting PUP, on their "Morbid Stuff Tour-pocalypse" tour in April. Performances at several UK festivals followed, including 2000 Trees, Boomtown Fair, Truck Festival and Camden Rocks. After signing to a new label, Music For Nations, the band performed main stage sets at the Reading and Leeds Festivals. Shortly afterwards, drummer Oli Holbrook left Milk Teeth, being replaced by Nervus drummer Jack Kenny, leaving Blomfield as the sole original member of the lineup. Following this change, Milk Teeth once again embarked on a short UK tour with Cultdreams and Nervus, in support of their latest single, Given Up, which was released on 11 October 2019. The following month, Milk Teeth released another single entitled Destroyer, on 29 November.

On 17 January 2020, Milk Teeth officially announced their self-titled second album, which was released on 27 March.

On 4 September 2020, Milk Teeth announced that they had split up.

== Musical style and influences ==
Critics have categorised Milk Teeth's music as punk rock, emo grunge, post-hardcore and grunge. Forbes noted their music as incorporating elements of sludge metal and shoegaze.

They have cited influences including Title Fight, Superheaven, Pity Sex, Japanese Voyeurs, Hole, Nirvana, Green Day, Sum 41, Nothing, the Pixies, Paramore, Smashing Pumpkins and Slipknot.

== Discography ==
=== Studio albums ===
Title	Album details
Vile Child	Released: 29 January 2016; Label: Hopeless; Format: CD, DL, LP
Milk Teeth	Released: 27 March 2020; Label: Music For Nations; Format: CD, DL, LP

=== Extended Plays ===
Title	Album details
Fuck	Released: 2012; Label: Self-released; Format: DL
Smiling Politely	Released: 6 August 2013; Label: Self-released; Format: DL
Sad Sack	Released: 14 April 2015; Label: Venn; Format: CD, DL, LP
Be Nice	Released: 28 July 2017; Label: Roadrunner Records UK; Format: DL, LP
Go Away	Released: 17 November 2017; Label: Roadrunner Records UK; Format: DL, LP

=== Singles ===
"Nearby Catfight" was released as a single ahead of the release of the Be Nice EP and reached number 5 on the Kerrang! Rock Chart in October 2017. The band's first single as a trio, "Stain" was released in December 2018, debuting at 12 in the Kerrang! Rock Chart.

== Band members ==
=== Final line-up ===
- Becky Blomfield – vocals, bass guitar (2013–2020)
- Em Foster – vocals, lead guitar (2018–2020)
- Jack Kenny – drums, percussion (2019–2020)

=== Former members ===
- Josh Bannister – vocals, lead guitar (2013–2016)
- Christopher Webb – rhythm guitar (2013–2018)
- Billy Hutton – vocals, lead guitar (2016–2018)
- Oliver Holbrook – drums, percussion (2013–2019)
