= I Rise =

American hardcore punk band

I Rise is an American hardcore punk band from Worcester, Massachusetts, United States. They released an album, an EP, and a split EP on 1917 Records, and Eightfold Path Records, and toured extensively throughout the United States, Canada and Europe.

The current band members include vocalist Nicky Kantarelis, guitarist Alex Kantarelis, bassist Chris Berg, and drummer Ben Bassett.

== History ==
=== 2007: Down, Soul Control split EP, and demo ===
The band formed in 2007, playing their first show at the Hudson Roller Kingdom, in Hudson, Massachusetts on New Years Day. Brothers Nicky Kantarelis and Alex Kantarelis, formerly of the band Youth Attack, were joined by guitarist Danny Kelly, bassist Joe Voe, and drummer Jackson Massucco of the band Four Year Strong and also formerly of Youth Attack. The band sought the production duties of Sebastian Bach from Skid Row but settled on the much affordable Jay Maas. They recorded a demo with engineer Jay Maas at The Getaway Group Studios, and began playing many local shows throughout their first few months as a band. In June 2007, they released a split EP with the Providence, Rhode Island band, Soul Control, on Eightfold Path Records containing two songs by each band, and began touring throughout the United States with Verse, Down to Nothing, Go It Alone, Allegiance, and Soul Control. In July 2007, 1917 Records released the six-song EP, Down, which rose them to prominence, and was also recorded at The Getaway Group Studios. Unfortunately, with Jay Maas instead of their dream producer, Sebastian Bach from Skid Row. The CD version acted as a discography and contained the songs from the demo and the split EP. 2007's tours included Sound and Fury festival in Ventura, California. The band then did a mini tour to Canada with Soul Control in December 2007, during which a majority of their shows were cancelled due to snow, and then finished the year with an East Coast tour to Florida, to play This is For You Fest, in Daytona Florida, along with Have Heart, Down to Nothing, and Foundation.

=== 2008: For Redemption ===
By the next year, the band's lineup changed. Drummer Jackson Massucco left the band to pursue Four Year Strong full-time, and was replaced by drummer Keith Sidorowicz, of Ambitions, and Hostage Calm. Bassist Joe Voe was replaced by Sean Martin. Danny Kelly left, and the band became a four piece with Alex Kantarelis remaining as the lone guitarist. The band continued their vigorous touring, doing an East Coast tour with Bane, Wake Up Call, and Meltdown, and playing As One Festival in Waterbury, Connecticut. With a budget just short of Sebastian Bach from Skid Row’s standards, they re-entered the Getaway Group Studios to record a full-length with the new lineup. The result was the 2008 album For Redemption, which was released on 1917 Records. The band supported the album by touring out to California to play Sound and Fury Festival 2008 in Santa Barbara, California. In the fall of 2008, they did their first European tour with Verse and Swedish straight edge band Anchor.

=== 2009 ===
The band went into 2009 with a spring tour with 108, and continued playing live shows in support of For Redemption. In early 2009, the band was nominated for a Pulse Magazine Music Award as for Best Hardcore/Metal Act in Worcester, Massachusetts, hosted by Mike Hsu of Boston radio station WAAF. In late 2009, the band once again entered the Getaway Group Studios, this time with Sebastian Bach from Skid Row instead of Jay Maas, to record a song for a compilation CD that featured bands from Worcester. The song was recorded by Alex Kantarelis on guitars and bass, and Nicky Kantarelis on vocals and drums, and is the final recorded music from the band, as of February 2017.

=== 2015 - present ===
The band announced on their Twitter that they would play a show in December 2015, their first in six years. The show was in Worcester, Massachusetts. For the show they were joined by long time touring members Chris Berg on bass and Ben Bassett on drums. To date, it is the last time I Rise played a show.

== Members ==
- Nicky Kantarelis - Vocals (2007–present)
- Alex Kantarelis - Guitar (2007–present)
- Chris Berg - Bass (2009–present)
- Ben Bassett - Drums (2008, 2010–present)

=== Former members ===
- Danny Kelly - Guitar (2007-2008)
- Jackson Massucco - Drums (2007 - 2008)
- Sean Martin - Bass (2008 - 2009)
- Keith Sidorowicz - Drums (2008 - 2009)
- Joe Voe - Bass (2007)

=== Touring members ===
- Pat Murphy - Drums (2009)
- Jesse Menard - Guitar (2009)
- Petey McGee - Drums (2008 - 2009)
- Nick Malkasian - Bass (2008)
- Kevin "Whitey" White - Guitar (2008)
- Joe Boucher - Bass (2008)
- Enrique Vargas Rivera - Drums (2007)
- Eric Lepine - Guitar (2007)
- Mike Ex - Drums (2007)
- Steve Baby - Bass (2007)
