= Hundredth (band) =

American rock band

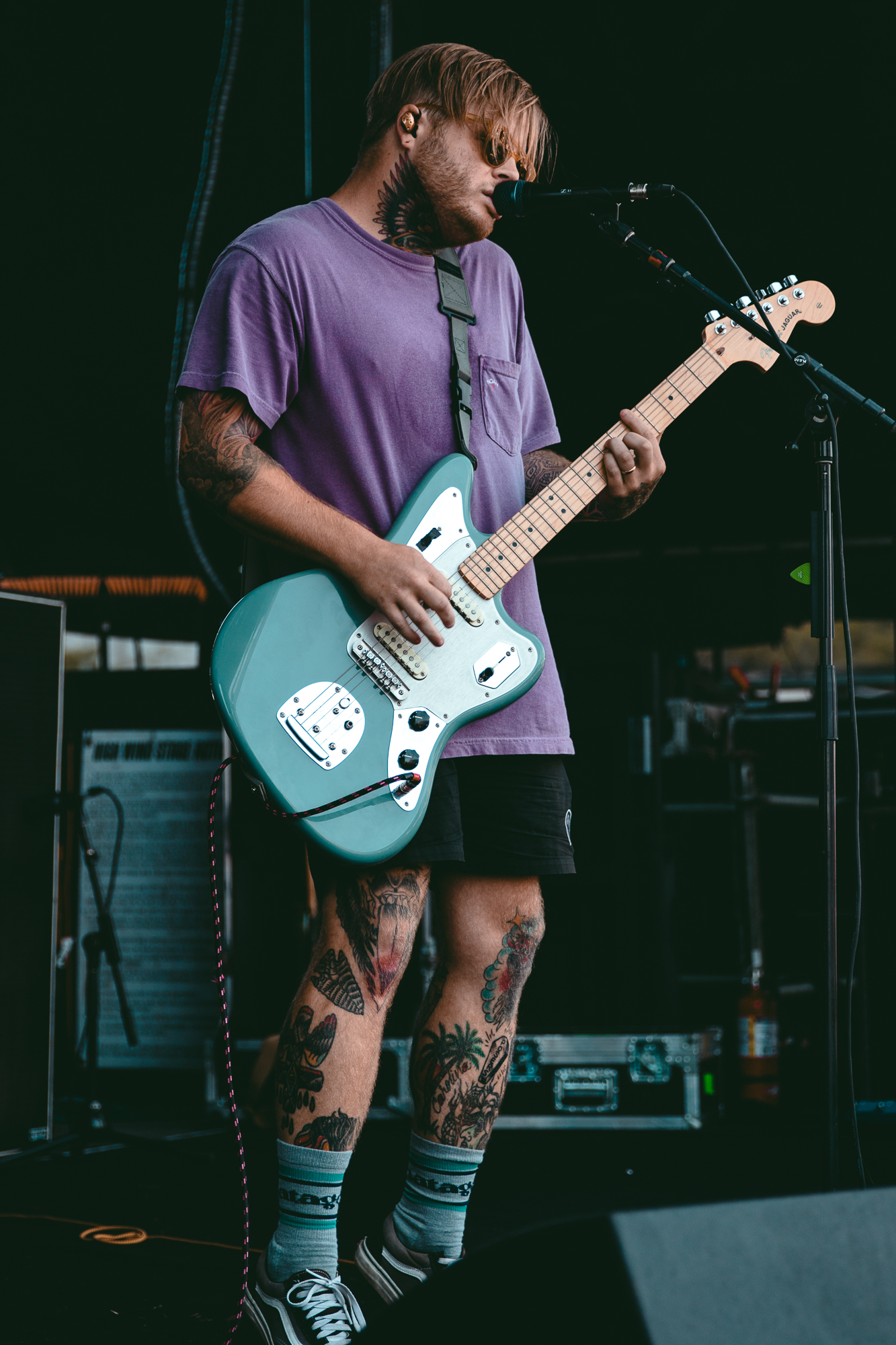
- Chadwick Johnson performing live with Hundredth in 2017.

Background information
- Origin: Myrtle Beach, South Carolina, United States
- Genres: Shoegaze; dream pop; alternative rock; melodic hardcore (early)
- Years active: 2008–present
- Labels: Hopeless, Mediaskare
- Members: Chadwick Johnson; Alex Blackwell IV; Andrew Minervini
- Past members: J. P. Gressman; Blake Hardman; Matt Koontz; Michael Raymo; Joel Gunter; Lee Hutchison
- Website: Official Site

Hundredth is an American rock band from Myrtle Beach, South Carolina formed in 2008 led by singer and songwriter Chadwick Johnson. They have released five albums and five EPs. The band started out playing melodic hardcore that morphed into indie rock by the release of the 2017 album Rare.

== History ==
=== When Will We Surrender, Let Go, Revolt/Resist, and Free (2008–2016) ===
Hundredth formed in 2008 in Myrtle Beach from a previous outfit called the Hundredth. After self-releasing the EP Dusk, the band started playing the live-circuit. Their debut record When Will We Surrender was released by Mediaskare Records on March 30, 2010. The first single from that album was "Desolate", and a music video was released on YouTube on March 18, 2010. Their second album, Let Go, was released on September 27, 2011 by Mediaskare Records. The first single from that album, "Live Today" was released on Mediaskare Record's YouTube channel on July 22, 2011. The band released two EPs, "Revolt" and "Resist" through Mediaskare and No Sleep records in 2013-2014. The album reached the Billboard Heatseekers chart in October 2011.

The group signed to Hopeless Records in 2014, and released their third album Free on June 12, 2015. They promoted the release of their third album during the 2015 Vans Warped Tour. The band toured extensively supporting the album through 2016, including Europe. In early 2016, the band parted ways with guitarist Blake Hardman and welcomed back original member Alex Blackwell.

=== RARE and Ultrarare (2017–2018) ===
In early 2017 worked together with producer Sam Pura to record the album RARE, released June 16, 2017 on Hopeless Records. It featured a stylistic change for the band, moving away from their established melodic hardcore sound and into shoegaze and indie rock. Johnson explained that “the truth is we didn't want to keep doing the same thing over and over. Churn out a ‘safe’ record to keep the train moving and food on the table. We drained our ‘hardcore’ vein on Free. After it, we felt unfulfilled and boxed in”. Rare was included in the Top 50 Albums of 2017 by Stereogum. Hundredth was praised to be “well on their way into the indie pantheon of impenetrable rock acts” by Alternative Press.

In late 2017 vocalist/guitarist Chadwick Johnson announced a solo project Pure Violet with the premiere of two singles “Garden” and “Numb” on Stereogum.

On June 15, 2018, Hundredth released Ultrarare, a remix/reinterpretation EP of their 2017 album Rare. The 7-song EP was produced, mixed, and mastered by vocalist Chadwick Johnson. Speaking on the EP's inspiration, Johnson said he "started toying around on a couple of the songs using synths instead of guitars and the songs went to a completely different place. Rare is a rush. Ultrarare is the comedown.”

The band announced on November 17, 2018 through their social networks that they had parted ways with Hopeless Records and that they were "officially an independent band."

=== Somewhere Nowhere (2019 - present) ===
On May 10, the band teased the upcoming song "Whatever". On May 22, the single "Whatever" premiered on Stereogum, who said of the track: "Befitting its influences, the song’s hook is beyond catchy, managing to land with absolute grace in the echo-drenched, reverb-soaked space." The digital single "Whatever" was officially released to all streaming platforms on May 24, 2019. It was followed by "Leave Yourself", "Cauterize" and "Iridescent" over the course of the summer. The latter presented as an EP with the three previous tracks included.

On September 2, 2020, Hundredth announced their fifth studio album Somewhere Nowhere, which was self-released on October 9, 2020. The album's first single "Bottle It Up" was released to all streaming platforms that same day. The 14 track album included all the tracks previously released that year.

== Influences ==
Hundredth's early influences were Strongarm, Shai Hulud, Verse and Thursday. Since 2017, they have cited influences including My Bloody Valentine, Chapterhouse, Slowdive, Smashing Pumpkins, Interpol, LCD Soundsystem, the Strokes, Radiohead, the National, the Police, and Editors.

== Members ==
Current members

- Chadwick Johnson – lead vocals (2008–present); rhythm guitar, keyboards (2017–present)
- Alex Blackwell IV – lead guitar, backing vocals (2008–2012; 2016–present); keyboards (2020–present)
- Andrew Minervini – rhythm guitar (2010–2017); bass (2017–present)

Touring members

- Anthony Ghazel – drums (2020)

Former members

- Blake Hardman – lead guitar (2013–2015)
- Joel Gunter – rhythm guitar (2008–2010)
- Michael Raymo – bass (2008–2010)
- J. P. Gressman – bass (2011–2016)
- Matt Koontz – drums (2008–2014; touring 2018–2020)
- Lee Hutchison – drums (2015–2018)

== Discography ==
Studio albums

- When Will We Surrender (2010, Mediaskare)
- Let Go (2011, Mediaskare)
- Free (2015, Hopeless)
- RARE (2017, Hopeless)
- Somewhere Nowhere (2020, self-released)
- Faded Splendor (2025, self-released)

Live albums

- Welcome To Somewhere Nowhere (Live) (2021, self-released)

EPs

- Dusk (2008, self-released)
- Revolt (2013, Mediaskare)
- Resist (2014, Mediaskare)
- RARE B-Sides (2017, Hopeless)
- Ultrarare (2018, Hopeless)

Singles

- Dead Weight (2016, Hopeless)
- Victim (2016, Hopeless)
- Whatever (2019, self-released)
- Cauterize (2019, self-released)
- Leave Yourself (2019, self-released)
- Iridescent (2019, self-released)
- Sleeping In (The Postal Service cover) (2020, self-released)
- Idioteque (Radiohead cover) (2020, self-released)
- Fantasize (2022, self-released)
- Dark Side (2025, self-released)
- Waste (2025, self-released)
