= Stateside (band) =

Australian band

- Origin: Brisbane, Queensland, Australia
- Genres: Alternative rock; pop punk; punk rock
- Years active: 2014–2020
- Past members: Erin Reus; Ethan Laenen; Jackson Lehane; Hamish Maguire; Denzil Bowen; Brendan Heidke

Stateside were an Australian rock band from Brisbane, formed in 2014. The band consisted of guitarist Ethan Laenen, drummer Hamish Maguire, bassist Jackson Lehane, and vocalist Erin Reus. Stateside released three independent EPs: Burning Bridges (2015), Naïve (2017) and Havøc (2020). They broke up in 2020, without ever having released a studio album.

== History ==
=== Early years and Burning Bridges (2014–2016) ===
Stateside was officially formed on 17 March 2014 as a rock band in Brisbane by high school friends: Erin Reus on lead vocals, Ethan Laenen on lead guitar, Brendan Heidke on rhythm guitar, Denzil Bowen on bass guitar, and Hamish Maguire on drums. The band spent the year writing demos that would later become their debut EP Burning Bridges released on the one-year anniversary of the band's inception in 2015. Earlier that year, Stateside entered the Brisbane Battle of the Bands and were one of the top six finalists, unfortunately the band lost against Counterfeit Umbrellas. The popularity of the Burning Bridges EP led to the band opening as the local support for bands; The Wonder Years, As It Is, Cute Is What We Aim For, Knuckle Puck and With Confidence. The band embarked on 3 national tours over the next year as the openers for popular local bands in support of the Burning Bridges EP.

=== Bowen's departure, Lehane's arrival and Naïve (2016–2018) ===
2016 saw the band start to restructure their sound with the help of producer Troy Brady, formerly of The Amity Affliction. Due to conflicting schedules, founding bassist Denzil Bowen left Stateside in early 2016 to focus on university study. After spending a year working on new music, the band released their new single "The Way We Were" in March 2017. The music video for the single has now gained over 1'000'000 views and took the band to new heights of popularity. Bassist, Jackson Lehane joined the band shortly after in early 2017, just prior to the release of their Naïve EP which released on 25 May. The EP reached No. 9 on the Alt iTunes Charts and No. 28 on overall charts and was met with favourable reviews. The band then spent the rest of the year on tour promoting this new EP, supporting Against the Current and Stepson. The EP was praised for exploring issues on toxic relationships and emotional turmoil.

On 2 February 2018, the bands second single from the EP, "Neon" was released alongside an accompanying music video, just days before the bands first national headline tour. The Naïve Tour saw the band filling rooms all over the country & was supported Stuck Out. The band spent the rest of 2018 on the road supporting several bands, in April they opened for Simple Plan on their Australian leg of the No Pads, No Helmets...Just Balls 15th Anniversary tour. In July, they supported Belle Haven on their You, Me & Everything in Between tour alongside Casey. In September, nearly 140 bands, including Stateside, performed at the annual BIGSOUND music conference in Brisbane. Stateside were part of the second lineup of over 60 other bands. In December they supported Neck Deep on the Australian leg of their The Peace and the Panic tour, as well as nabbing a spot on the lineup for the inaugural Good Things festival in Brisbane as a local support band. Through extensive touring & promotion of the Naïve Tour in 2018 the band made a name for themselves throughout Australia & were listed by Hysteria Mag as an upcoming band to look out for.

=== Havøc and disbandment (2019–2020) ===
In April 2019, the band performed at the inaugural UsFest to raise funds for Girls Rock! Sydney. The event was created by RedHook vocalist and Music Feeds journalist Emmy Mack. Later in the year the band was the main support for With Confidence's Australian tour. In December, in addition to frontwoman Erin Reus appearing on stage at Good Things 2019 again to sing "Jet Lag" alongside Simple Plan, Stateside was invited to open for one of two Simple Plan sideshows in Brisbane.

In March 2020, they supported Japanese rock band One Ok Rock along with US band Set It Off on the Australian leg of their Eye of the Storm world tour. In August, the band announced the release of their new EP Havøc would be their final effort, its only single "Low" was released on 12 August. The band disbanded following the EP's release that September. The band cited growing apart and wanting to go in different directions with their lives as the reason.

== Musical style ==
Front woman Erin Reus cited Bring Me the Horizon and PVRIS as major influences to the band's sound, especially on their 2017 EP Naïve. "As a young person learning about love, I didn’t know how else to express my feelings other than to write about them. I spent a lot of time hovering over all of the problems, and writing/recording/releasing the EP was basically closure for me......." said Reus when interviewed about her lyric writing on the Naïve EP. Reus' vocal talent has been described as a mix of Jenna McDougall, from Tonight Alive, and Halsey.

== Members ==
Final line-up

- Erin Reus – vocals (2014–2020)
- Ethan Laenen – lead guitar (2014–2020), rhythm guitar (2018–2020)
- Jackson Lehane – bass (2017–2020)
- Hamish Maguire – drums (2014–2020)

Former members

- Denzil Bowen – bass (2014–2016)
- Brendan Heidke – rhythm guitar (2014–2018)

== Discography ==
=== Extended plays ===
List of extended plays
Title	Details	Peak chart positions
Title	Details	AUS
Burning Bridges	Released: 17 March 2015; Label: Self-released; Format: Digital download, streaming	–
Naïve	Released: 25 May 2017; Label: Self-released; Format: Digital download, streaming	– (Note: Naïve did not enter the ARIA charts, but did peak at No. 9 on the Alternative iTunes Charts and at No. 28 overall iTunes charts in Australia.)
Havøc	Released: 18 September 2020; Label: Self-released; Format: Digital download, streaming, LP	–

=== Singles ===
Title	Year	Album
"Jealousy"	2015	Burning Bridges
"The Way We Were"	2017	Naïve
"Neon"	2018	Naïve
"Low"	2020	Havøc

=== Music videos ===
Year	Song	Director
2017	"The Way We Were"	James Unwin
2018	"Neon"	Nick Hargans
2020	"Low"	Kez Ellis-Jones
