= Trapped Under Ice =

American hardcore punk band

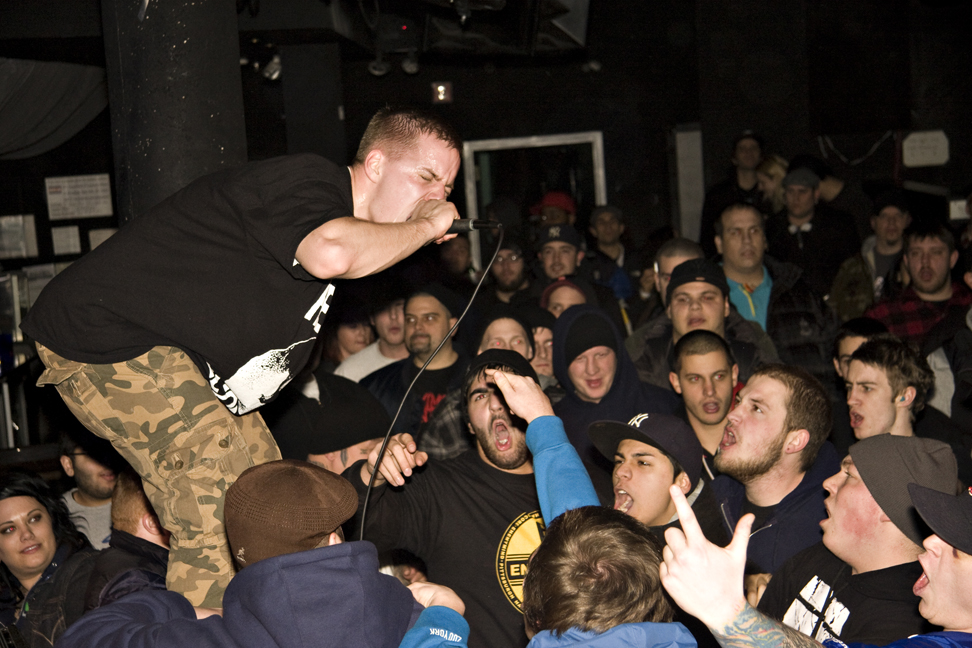
- Tripp performing with the Trapped Under Ice in 2009.

Background information
- Origin: Baltimore, Maryland, U.S.
- Genres: Hardcore punk; beatdown hardcore; tough guy hardcore
- Years active: 2007–2013, 2015–present
- Labels: Pop Wig; Reaper; Good Fight
- Spinoffs: Angel Dust; Diamond Youth; Turnstile
- Members: Justice Tripp; Sam Trapkin; Brad Hyra; Jared Carman; Brendan Yates
- Past members: Ben Esparza; Daniel Klipa; Eric Mach
- Website: www.facebook.com/trappedunderice

Trapped Under Ice is an American hardcore punk band from Baltimore, Maryland that was formed in 2007. Since then they have released an EP and three full-length albums. Taking influence from New York hardcore, the band has toured all over the world and was signed to Reaper Records. On August 11, 2013, Trapped Under Ice played its last show at Philadelphia's The Electric Factory at This Is Hardcore Festival 2013. The band announced their reunion in early 2015. In 2017 they released their third LP, Heatwave, on Pop Wig Records.

== History ==
=== 2007-2011: Early years ===
Trapped Under Ice was formed in 2007 by Justice Tripp and Sam Trapkin on guitars, with Anton Rough on vocals. By the time of recording their demo tape later that year, the band's lineup had revolved to Justice Tripp on vocals, Sam Trapkin and Daniel Klipa on guitars, Eric Mach on bass and Ben Esparza on drums.

In July/August 2009, the band was part of the 10 for $10 tour. Each show of the tour would feature 10 bands and admission would only cost $10. The tour was headlined by Poison the Well and featured a rotating lineup on select dates with Madball, Bane, Vision of Disorder, Terror, Death Before Dishonor, War of Ages, Crime in Stereo, Trapped Under Ice, the Mongoloids, the Ghost Inside, This is Hell, and Vision. The band released their debut EP Stay Cold on August 19, 2008 via Reaper Records. Later in the year, the band released a pink split 7" with UK hardcore band Dirty Money via A389 Recordings.

On August 4, 2009, the band released their debut full-length album Secrets of the World via Reaper Records. In 2009, following the departure of Ben Esperanza, the band enlisted drummer Brendan Yates, who would later go on to form and be the vocalist of Turnstile. Yates would also later join Angel Du$t and form Diamond Youth with fellow Trapped Under Ice bandmates Justice Tripp and Sam Trapkin respectively.

In February 2010, the band embarked on the Bowl Camp tour in Japan with support from Numb. In 2010, the band embarked on a co-headlining US tour with Bane with support from Cruel Hand and Alpha & Omega. In March 2011, the band supported Madball and Born from Pain on the Rebellion Tour in Europe alongside Wisdom in Chains, All for Nothing, and Devil in Me.

=== 2011-2013: Big Kiss Goodnight and disbandment ===
On April 12, 2011, the band announced they would go into the studio in June with New Found Glory guitarist Chad Gilbert to record their new album. In April 2012, the band supported Your Demise on the Rock Sound Impericon Exposure Tour in the UK alongside Man Overboard and Basement. On October 7, 2011, the band released their second album Big Kiss Goodnight via Reaper Records. The album was received with much critical acclaim. Many people credit this album with re-popularizing beatdown hardcore at a time when melodic hardcore was popular.

In March 2012, the band embarked on an Australian headlining tour with support from Relentless. In April/May 2013, the band embarked on a headlining UK tour with support from Backtrack, Broken Teeth, and Climate. On August 11, 2013, the band played their (at the time) final show performing on day three of the 2013 edition of This Is Hardcore festival the Electric Factory.

=== 2015-present: Reunion and Heatwave ===
After a two year hiatus, it was announced the band would reunite to headline Back to School Jam 2015 in Howell, NJ on September 12, 2015 alongside Code Orange, Incendiary, 100 Demons, Suburban Scum, Weekend Nachos, Naysayer, Rude Awakening, Lifeless, Freedom, Give, Blind Justice, Eternal Sleep, and Manipulate.

On May 24, 2017, the band announced their third album with the release of the albums lead single "Do It" featuring vocals from Pissed Jeans vocalist Matt Korvette. On June 10, 2017, the band headlined day two of Sound and Fury Festival at The Regent Theater in Los Angeles. On July 21, 2017, the band released their third album, Heatwave, via Pop Wig, the label that Tripp and Yates own with fellow Turnstile bandmate Daniel Fang. In August/September 2017, the band embarked on a Northeast US tour with support from Fury and Freedom. In February 2018, the band embarked on a weekend co-headlining tour with No Warning, with support from Wisdom in Chains. In April/May 2020, the band was set to do an Australian headlining tour with support from Born Free, which was cancelled due to the growing Coronavirus.

After two years of inactivity, it was announced the band would return to headline Disturbin' the Peace festival in Baltimore on January 28, 2023 with support from End It, No Warning, Scowl, Never Ending Game, Zulu, Buggin,' Mutually Assured Destruction, Jivebomb, and Hold My Own. This was followed by the announcement of a headline show in Brooklyn the day after with support from Bulldoze, Pain of Truth, Crown of Thornz, Division of Mind, Illusion, Volcano, and Carried by Six. Both of these shows sold out within an hour of being announced. It was later announced the band would appear at the 2023 edition of Outbreak Fest and would co-headline Tied Down in Detroit with Gorilla Biscuits.

== Musical style and legacy ==
Trapped Under Ice's music has been categorized by critics as hardcore punk, tough guy hardcore and beatdown hardcore. The band have cited influences including Biohazard (particularly their 1994 album State of the World Address), Crown of Thornz, Integrity, Merauder, Fury of Five, Gauze, Hatebreed, Madball, Odd Man Out, Gag and Bulldoze. Vocalist Justice Tripp has cited his main influences as James Ismean of Fury of Five and Iggy Pop of the Stooges.

The band were one of the most prominent bands in hardcore in the early 2010s. According to New Noise magazine, the band's second album Big Kiss Goodnight (2011) changing the sonic landscape of hardcore at the time, with Stereogum writer Tom Breiham stating in a 2023 article that "it's been years since we've gotten a new Trapped Under Ice song, but that band's influence looms large over the entire hardcore landscape today." They have been cited as an influence by musicians including Speed and Ghostemane.

== Members ==
=== Current ===
- Sam Trapkin – guitar (2007–2013, 2015–present)
- Justice Tripp – vocals (2007–2013, 2015–present), guitar (2007)
- Jared Carman – bass (2008–2013, 2015–present)
- Brad Hyra – guitar (2008–2013, 2015–present)
- Brendan Yates – drums (2009–2013, 2015–present)

=== Former ===
- Anton Rough – vocals (2007)
- Ben Esparaza – drums (2007–2009)
- Daniel Klipa – guitar (2007–2008)
- Eric Mach – bass (2007–2008)

=== Touring members ===
- Derrick Daniel – drums (2023)

== Discography ==
=== Albums ===
- Secrets of the World (Reaper Records, 2009)
- Big Kiss Goodnight (Reaper Records, 2011)
- Heatwave (Pop Wig Records, 2017)

=== EPs ===
- Demo (Flatspot Records, 2007)
- Stay Cold 7" (Reaper Records, 2008)
- Trapped Under Ice/Dirty Money Split (A389 Recordings, 2008)
