= Secrets of the World =

Studio album by Trapped Under Ice
- Released: August 4, 2009
- Recorded: Dean Bultulonis
- Studio: Arctic Studios Baltimore
- Genre: Hardcore punk
- Length: 22:49
- Label: Reaper

Trapped Under Ice chronology
| Stay Cold (2008) | Secrets of the World (2009) | Big Kiss Goodnight (2011) |

Professional ratings
Review scores
| Source | Rating |
|---|---|
| Punknews | 4/5 stars |

Secrets of the World is the first studio album by Baltimore, Maryland hardcore punk band Trapped Under Ice. It was released in 2009 on Reaper Records. In Europe, the album was released by German record label Demons Run Amok Entertainment.

== Track listing ==
| No. | Title | Length |
|---|---|---|
| 1. | "See God" | 1:25 |
| 2. | "Believe" | 2:09 |
| 3. | "American Dreams" | 1:15 |
| 4. | "TUI" | 1:49 |
| 5. | "Gemini" | 2:59 |
| 6. | "Too True" | 2:44 |
| 7. | "The Vortex" | 0:51 |
| 8. | "Eye Hand" | 1:34 |
| 9. | "From Birth" | 2:02 |
| 10. | "Titus" | 2:04 |
| 11. | "Against the Wall" | 2:06 |
| 12. | "World I Hate" | 1:51 |
