= Travels (Defeater album) =

Studio album by Defeater
- Released: September 16, 2008
- Recorded: 2008
- Genre: Melodic hardcore
- Length: 32:09
- Label: Topshelf, Bridge 9 (BR9144)

Defeater chronology
Travels (2008)	Lost Ground (2009)

Professional ratings
Review scores
Source	Rating
Sputnikmusic	4.5/5 stars
AbsolutePunk	(84%)

Travels is the debut studio album by American melodic hardcore band Defeater. The album was released on September 16, 2008, through Topshelf Records and re-released by Bridge 9 Records on February 24, 2009. It depicts the story of a young man born at the end of the Second World War to a struggling family living on the Jersey shores.

== Track listing ==
All tracks are written by Defeater.

No.	Title	Length
1.	"Blessed Burden"	3:04
2.	"Everything Went Quiet"	2:41
3.	"Nameless Streets"	3:05
4.	"Forgiver Forgetter"	2:33
5.	"The City by Dawn"	2:29
6.	"Prophet in Plain Clothes" (featuring Sean Murphy of Verse)	4:07
7.	"Carrying Weight"	2:25
8.	"Moon Shine"	2:11
9.	"The Blues"	0:57
10.	"Debts"	2:26
11.	"Cowardice"	6:19

== Personnel ==
- Derek Archambault – vocals
- Jason Maas – guitars
- Max Barror – bass
- Andy Reitz – drums
- Gus Pesce – guitars
