= Anxious (band) =

American emo band

- Origin: Fairfield County, Connecticut, U.S.
- Genres: Emo; emo pop; melodic hardcore; post-hardcore
- Years active: 2016–present
- Labels: Run for Cover, Triple-B
- Members: Grady Allen; Sam Allen; Jonny Camner; Dante Melucci; Tommy Harte
- Past members: Sam Walter; Ryan Savitski; Ross Thompson; Michelle Siegel
- Website: anxiousband.com

Anxious is an American emo band from Fairfield County, Connecticut. Formed in 2016, the band is currently signed to Run for Cover Records. They released their debut album in 2022 titled Little Green House. It received positive reviews, and was named Stereogum's "Album of the Week".

== History ==
Anxious was founded in 2016 in Darien, Connecticut, by vocalist/guitarist Grady Allen, vocalist/bassist Sam Walter and drummer Michelle Siegel. In 2017, Siegel left the group and was replaced by Dante Melucci. That same year, the band independently recorded and released their debut EP Carved. In 2019, they recruited lead guitarist Ryan Savitsky and signed to Triple-B Records. That year, the group recorded and released two more EPs: Promo 2019 and Never Better. Also that year, Grady Allen ceased playing guitar in the group. Melucci subsequently switched from drums to lead guitar/backing vocals, and Jonny Camner replaced him on drums/percussion. Shortly afterwards, Walter left the group and was replaced by bassist/backing vocalist Sam Allen.

In 2021, the band recorded and released their debut single "New Shapes", their first with the new lineup. Also that year, the band contributed a new song to the label's America's Hardcore Volume Five, with the song "The Long Spring". In 2022, the band signed with Run for Cover Records, and released their debut album, Little Green House. Shortly afterwards, Savitsky left the group, and was replaced by backing vocalist/rhythm guitarist Tommy Harte. The band subsequently released two singles, "Sunsign" and "Where You Been?" (the first of which was sung by Melucci).

In September 2023, the group released another single "Down, Down", which included shared lead vocals between Grady Allen and Melucci.

On October 17, 2024, the group released their first single "Counting Sheep", off their second album Bambi.

On February 21, 2025, Anxious released their second LP titled Bambi on Run for Cover Records.

== Influences ==
Anxious have cited influences including Samiam, Farside, Texas is the Reason, Dag Nasty, Embrace, Rites of Spring, Lifetime, Smashing Pumpkins, Panic! at the Disco, Jimmy Eat World, Death Cab For Cutie, Animal Collective and the Beach Boys.

== Members ==
=== Current members ===
- Grady Allen – vocals (2016–present), guitar (2016–2019)
- Sam Allen – bass (2021–present)
- Jonny Camner – drums (2019–present)
- Dante Melucci – guitar, vocals (2019–present), drums (2017–2019)
- Tommy Harte – guitar (2022–present; touring 2021–2022)

=== Former members ===
- Sam Walter – bass, vocals (2016–2020)
- Ryan Savitski – guitar (2019–2021)
- Ross Thompson – bass (2019–2020)
- Michelle Siegel – drums (2016)

== Discography ==
Studio albums

- Little Green House (2022, Run for Cover)
- Bambi (2025, Run for Cover)

=== EPs ===
- Carved (2017, self-released)
- Promo 2019 (2019, Triple-B Records)
- Never Better (2019, Triple-B Records)

=== Singles ===
- "New Shapes" (2021, Triple-B Records)
- "The Long Spring" (2021, Triple-B Records)
- "Call From You" (2021, Run for Cover)
- "Sunsign" (2022, Run for Cover)
- "Where You Been" (2022, Run for Cover)
- "Down, Down" (2023, Run for Cover)
