= The Carrier (band) =

- Origin: Boston, Massachusetts, U.S.
- Genres: Melodic hardcore
- Years active: 2006–2012
- Label: Deathwish Inc.

The Carrier was an American melodic hardcore band from Boston, Massachusetts, United States, which formed in 2006.

In 2006, the band self-released their debut demo whom they recorded with Jay Maas at the Getaway Group Studios. After a year of playing shows, in the summer of 2007 the band teamed up with Words of War Records to release a self-titled 7". In the winter of 2007, the band released its first full-length record entitled "One Year Later" on Rock Vegas Records. In 2008, the band released its second 7" entitled "No Love Can Save Me" on Deathwish Inc. In 2010, Deathwish Inc. re-released the album "One Year Later" in vinyl for the first time licensed from Rock Vegas Records. In 2011, the band released their second full-length record entitled "Blind To What Is Right" on Deathwish Inc.

The Carrier has completed tours alongside Agnostic Front, Shai Hulud, Killing the Dream, Dead Swans, Reign Supreme, plus several other DIY tours. They have played shows all across the United States, Europe, and Canada.

In early 2012, The Carrier and all members released a letter announcing their break up and consequent last European Tour and Boston show.

== Discography ==
Date of release	Title	Label
2006	Demo	Self Released
2007	Self Titled (EP)	Words of War Records
2007	One Year Later	Rock Vegas Records
2008	No Love Can Save Me (EP)	Deathwish Inc.
2010	One Year Later (Rerelease)	Deathwish Inc.
2010	Blind To What Is Right	Deathwish Inc.
