= Defeater (band) =

American melodic hardcore band

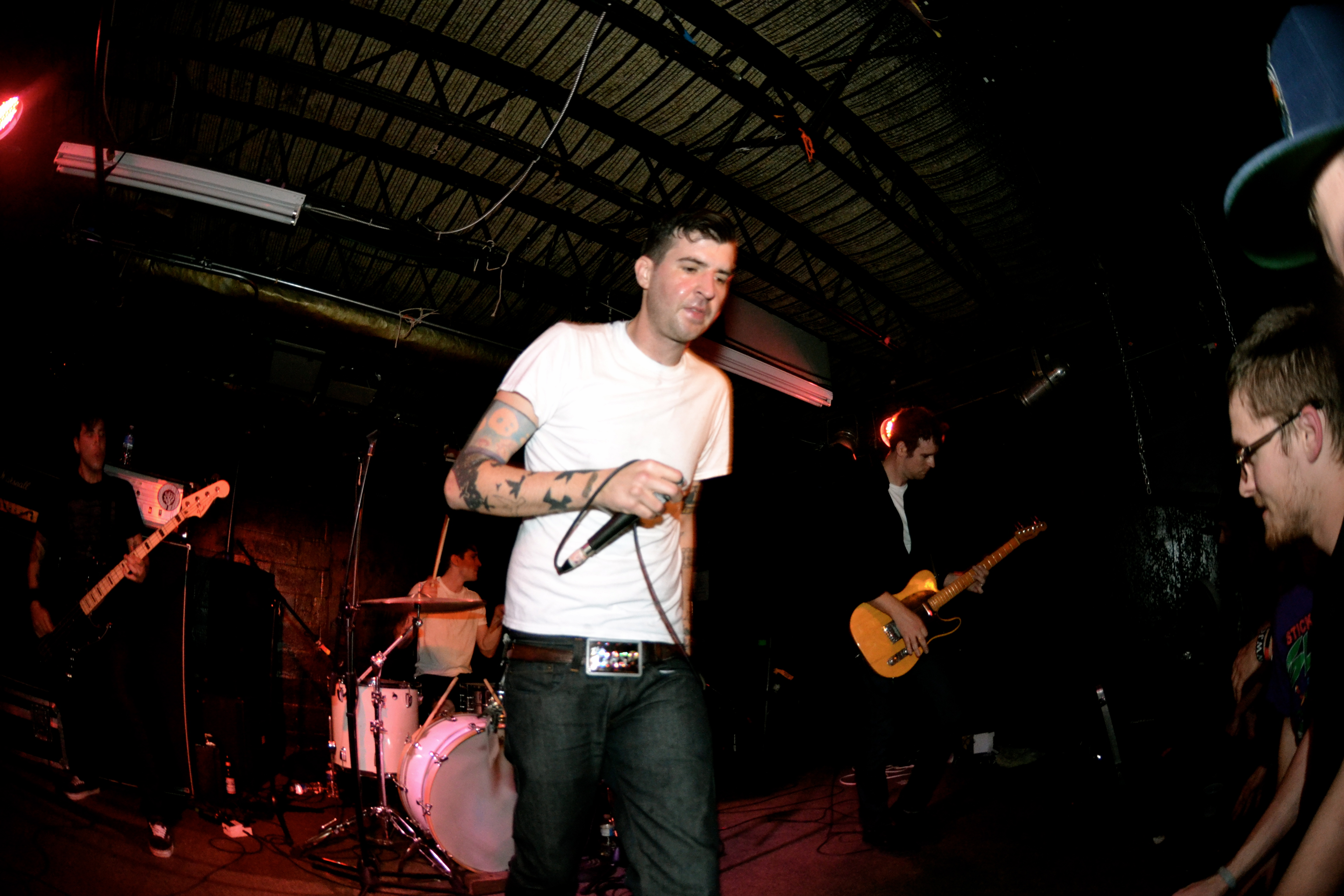
- Defeater performing in 2012

Background information
- Origin: Boston, Massachusetts, United States
- Genres: Melodic hardcore, post-hardcore; emo
- Years active: 2008–present
- Labels: Epitaph; Bridge 9; Topshelf
- Members: Derek Archambault; Mike Poulin; Jake Woodruff; Joe Longobardi; Adam Crowe
- Past members: Max Barror; Gus Pesce; Andy Reitz; Jay Maas

Defeater is an American melodic hardcore band from Massachusetts, formed in 2008. To date they have released five full-length albums, two EPs and three singles. The band lineup consists of Derek Archambault (vocals), Jake Woodruff (guitar), Joe Longobardi (drums) and Mike Poulin (bass). The band's earlier works have been released via Bridge 9 Records, aside from the album Travels, which was initially released via Topshelf Records, but was later reissued on Bridge 9 Records. Their studio album, Letters Home, was released on July 16, 2013, and debuted at number 72 on Billboard Top 200 chart, number 1 on the vinyl chart and number 13 on the Current Alternative Album chart. They released an album in 2015 titled, Abandoned and in 2019 they released their self-titled album, both on Epitaph Records.

Alongside La Dispute, Make Do and Mend, Pianos Become the Teeth and Touché Amoré, Defeater were a core band to the wave, a movement and loosely-defined collective of 2010s post-hardcore bands.

Defeater has toured with the likes of La Dispute, Carpathian, Comeback Kid, Bane, Energy. and Miles Away. They supported August Burns Red in 2013. They played the second stage at Hevy Music Festival 2011 and appeared on the second half of the 2013 Vans' Warped Tour, playing on the Monster Stage.

== Musical style and lyrics ==
All of their music serves as narration over one overarching story, telling of the struggles of a working class New Jersey family in the Post-World War II Era. Vocalist Derek Archambault stated in a 2009 interview that all of Defeater's work would take place within this story.

In October 2015, just a few months after the release of their Epitaph Records debut, Abandoned, the band kicked Jay Maas out of the band citing "personal differences."

On March 5, 2019, the band released a music video for "Mother's Sons" and announced their self-titled album, produced by Will Yip, would be released May 10, 2019.

They have cited influences including Modern Life is War, Verse, Have Heart, Rise Against, 108, Bane, Converge, Cave In, Cursive, the Appleseed Cast, Articles of Faith, Orchid, These Arms Are Snakes, Ink & Dagger, the Bronx, Hot Snakes, Shai Hulud, the Hope Conspiracy, Paint It Black, Strike Anywhere, Ride, Swervedriver, Caspian, Mono and Mogwai.

== Members ==
Current

- Derek Archambault – lead vocals, guitars, piano, lyrics (2008–present)
- Mike Poulin – bass (2008–present)
- Jake Woodruff – guitars (2009–present)
- Joe Longobardi – drums (2011–present)
- Adam Crowe – guitars (2019–present)

Former

- Jason Maas – guitar, vocals (2008–2015)
- Max Barror – bass (2008)
- Gus Pesce – guitar (2008–2010), bass (2011)
- Andy Reitz – drums (2008–2011)

== Discography ==
=== Studio albums ===
- Travels (2008, Topshelf/Bridge 9)
- Empty Days & Sleepless Nights (2011, Bridge 9)
- Letters Home (2013, Bridge 9)
- Abandoned (2015, Epitaph)
- Defeater (2019, Epitaph)

=== EPs ===
- Lost Ground (2009)
- Live on BBC Radio 1 (2012)
- Live at TIHC (2014)

=== Singles ===
- "Dear Father" (2011)
- "Still & True" (2016)
- "Where Eagles Dare" (2016) (originally by Misfits)

=== Compilation contributions ===
- "Blew" (originally by Nirvana; tribute album Doused in Mud, Soaked in Bleach) (2016, Robotic Empire)

=== Videography ===
- "Empty Glass" (2011)
- "Bastards" (2013)
- "Spared in Hell" (2015)
- "Unanswered" (2015)
- "Divination" (2015)
