= Dead Swans =

English hardcore punk band

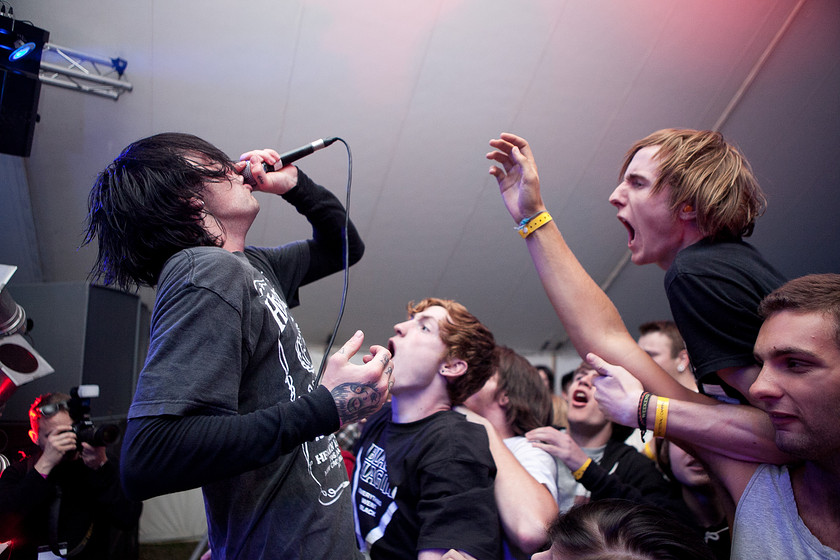
- Dead Swans live

Background information
- Origin: Brighton, England
- Genres: Hardcore punk, melodic hardcore
- Years active: 2006–2013, 2016–present
- Label: Bridge 9
- Members: Nicholas Worthington; Stewart "Pid" Payne; Benjamin Marco; Joey Bayes; Benny Mead
- Past members: Robbie Taylor; Craig Reynolds
- Website: www.myspace.com/thedeadswans

Dead Swans is an English hardcore punk band from Brighton, formed in 2006. They released one album entitled Sleepwalkers in 2009, as well as three EPs; Southern Blue (2008), It's Starting, (2009), and Anxiety and Everything Else (2012). They also released a split EP with metalcore band Architects in 2008.

== History ==
They were nominated in the Best British Newcomer category at the 2008 Kerrang! Awards.

On 11 January 2016, the band posted a short video clip via their Facebook account with the caption "2016...announcement soon", hinting at a potential reunion.

The band performed at the 2016 edition of Outbreak Festival at Canal Mills.

== Discography ==
Year of Release	Title	Label
2008	Southern Blue	Thirty Days of Night Records
2008	Architects / Dead Swans Split	Thirty Days of Night Records
2009	It's Starting	Bridge 9 Records
2009	Sleepwalkers	Bridge 9 Records
2012	Anxiety and Everything Else EP	Bridge 9 Records

== Music videos ==
- "Keep Them Shut" (Anxiety And Everything Else EP, 2012)

== Members ==
Current

- Nicholas Worthington - vocals (2006–2013, 2016–present)
- Stewart "Pid" Payne - guitar (2006–2013, 2016–present)
- Benjamin Marco - bass (2006–2013, 2016–present)
- Joey Bayes - guitar (2009–2013, 2016–present)
- Benny Mead - drums (2006–2011, 2016–present)

Past

- Robbie Taylor – guitar (2009)
- Craig Reynolds – drums (2011–2013)
