= Verse (band) =

American hardcore punk band

- Origin: Providence, Rhode Island, U.S.
- Genres: Hardcore punk, melodic hardcore
- Years active: 2003–2009, 2011–2013
- Label: Bridge 9 Records
- Members: Quinn Murphy (Note: At the time of Verse being active, Murphy was using the name Sean Murphy. They have since begun using the name Quinn Murphy.); Eric Lepine; Zak Drummond; Chris Berg; Shawn Costa
- Website: myspace.com/verse

Verse was an American hardcore punk band from Providence, Rhode Island. They released three full-length albums and an EP on Rivalry and Bridge 9 Records and conducted a number of full U.S. tours.

The band broke up in 2009, but reformed in December 2011.

Bassist Chris Berg played in Mountain Man, which features former members Patrick Murphy (Drums) and Jesse Menard (Guitar) of Last Lights and I Rise.

== History ==
=== Rebuild and From Anger and Rage (2004–2007) ===
Upon solidifying their lineup, Verse signed to Rivalry Records for their first full length Rebuild, which was recorded in May 2004. After the release of Rebuild, Verse went on to a heavy touring schedule. During August 2004, when the band was touring through South Carolina, they encountered some van troubles. While the van was getting fixed, approximately $10,000 worth of musical equipment were stolen from Verse’s trailer. After finishing their tour of the United States and a tour of Europe with Another Breath, Verse went into the studio to record their follow-up to Rebuild, From Anger and Rage.

From Anger and Rage was recorded by Dean Baltulonis at Atomic Fireball Studios in Brooklyn, New York. Upon completing the second album, Verse continued on their rigorous touring schedule, going on multiple US and European tours with bands like Guns Up!, Crime in Stereo, Down to Nothing, Shipwreck, and Have Heart. After a solid year and a half of touring in support of From Anger and Rage, Verse signed with Bridge 9 Records to release their third full length, Aggression. This album was also released in Germany through Prügelprinz Records.

=== Aggression and breakup (2008–2010) ===
Aggression was recorded at Godcity Studios, and The Getaway Group Studios by engineer Jay Maas, and was released on June 10, 2008. Allmusic reviewer Greg Prato described it as "straight-ahead, hard-hitting hardcore", while Chris Hidden of Rock Sound said, "these boys bring a progressive and conceptual approach to their brain-caving brutality that provides a refreshing spin on the norm." After the release of Aggression, Verse set back out on their heavy touring schedule, having already done one US tour with Have Heart, and two European tours with Have Heart, Shipwreck, and I Rise.

According to an article on KillYourStereo.com, in late 2008, Berg "broke edge" - meaning he decided to stop adhering to straight edge principles. The article quoted a posting from Berg on a Bridge 9 message board that read, in part, "about two weeks ago I decided that I no longer wanted to be straight edge so I made some changes in my life. This means that Verse is no longer a straight edge band and I'm not going to pretend like Verse was never a straight edge band because that would just be lame".

In his message, Berg said Verse would continue as a band, but on February 8, 2009, the band issued a statement on their MySpace page announcing their breakup; and on February 9, 2009, Punknews.org reported the band's breakup.

=== Reformation and indefinite hiatus (2011–2013) ===
On December 9, 2011, Bridge 9 Records announced Verse has reformed and will be touring and recording a new album in 2012, titled Bitter Clarity, Uncommon Grace, to be released on July 17 on Bridge 9. On January 27, 2012 the band were confirmed to be playing at Hevy Music Festival. On May 17, they premiered their new song "The Selfless of the Earth" on AbsolutePunk.net. The band has been inactive since the release of the album.

== Discography ==
- Four Songs (EP) (2003)
- Rebuild (2004)
- From Anger and Rage (2006)
- Aggression (2008)
- Bitter Clarity, Uncommon Grace (2012)
