= Melodic hardcore =

Music genre

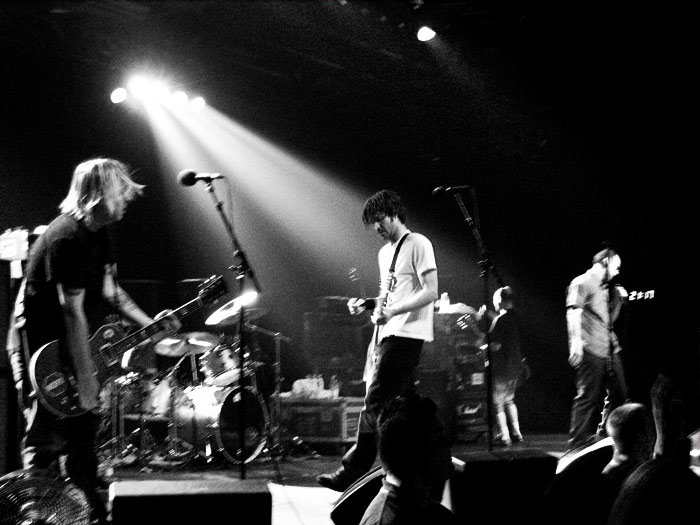
- Bad Religion's album Suffer (1988) had a major impact on the development of melodic hardcore
- Stylistic origins: Hardcore punk
- Cultural origins: Early 1980s, California and Washington, D.C., United States
- Derivative forms: Dreamcore; skate punk; trallpunk

Fusion genres
- Srscore

Regional scenes
- UKswell; the wave

Local scenes
- Boston; Chicago; Los Angeles; Washington, D.C.

Other topics
- List of melodic hardcore bands; emo; metalcore; pop punk; post-hardcore; melodic metalcore; youth crew

Melodic hardcore is a broadly defined subgenre of hardcore punk with a strong emphasis on melody in its guitar work. The style often includes guitar harmonies, riffs using octave chords, as well as broken chords. Additionally, lyrics tend towards intellectualism, often being politically conscious or narrative, with concept albums sometimes being prominent. Bands in the genre also have a tendency to take influence from a range of genres including emo, post-punk, screamo, pop-punk, metalcore, post-rock and gothic rock.

In the early and mid–1980s, bands including the Faith, Descendents, Dag Nasty, Gorilla Biscuits and 7 Seconds were amongst the first hardcore bands to put an emphasis on their melodies. In 1988, Bad Religion incorporated more melodic elements into their music with their third album Suffer, which was widely influential, and reshaped the skate punk genre from its purely hardcore origins into a subgenre of melodic hardcore. During the 1990s, this melodic skate punk style became one of the most prominent styles in punk, with NOFX, Pennywise and Strung Out emerging as forefront acts. 1988 also saw the formation of Inside Out and Turning Point who pioneered an additional style of melodic hardcore, rooted in youth crew, emo and tough guy hardcore. This style began to gain prominence towards the end of the 1990s with In My Eyes, Bane and Reach the Sky.

During the 2000s, the genre became the most prominent style in the hardcore scene, and diversified into a variety of styles including the horror punk and gothic rock informed style of AFI and the Nerve Agents, the heavy and nihilistic style of American Nightmare and the Hope Conspiracy, the more melodic and punk-leaning style of Rise Against and Strike Anywhere, the positive hardcore style of Have Heart and Verse and the emotional style of Defeater and Touché Amoré. Around 2009, the genre became less prominent in the American hardcore scene, but continued in the United Kingdom with Dead Swans and While She Sleeps, and in the American metalcore scene with Hundredth, the Ghost Inside and Counterparts. During the 2010s, British and Australian melodic hardcore bands including Casey and Holding Absence pushed the genre closer to post-rock. Since the beginning of the 2020s, the most prominent melodic hardcore bands have been One Step Closer, Anxious and Koyo.

== Characteristics ==
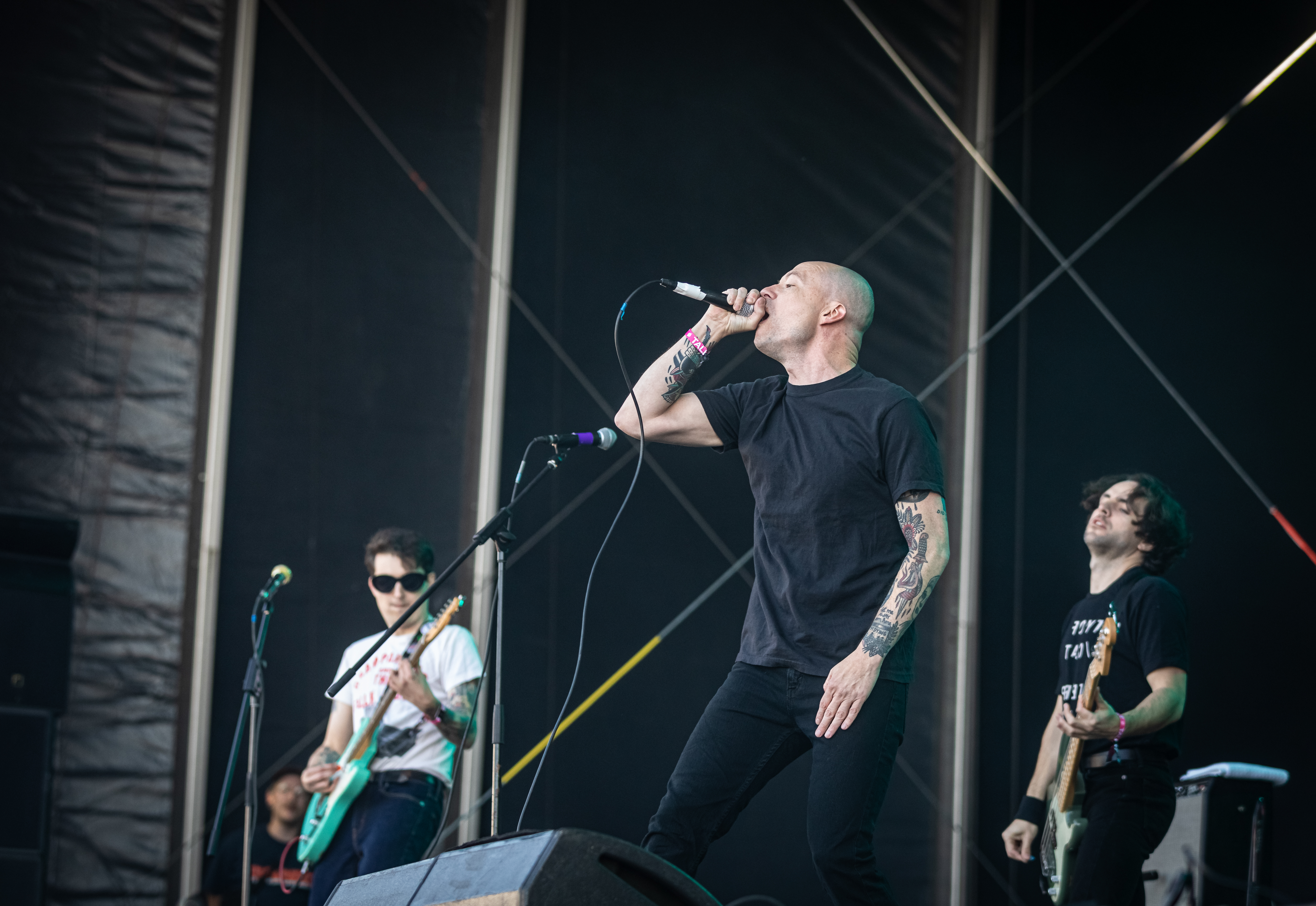
Touché Amoré pushed melodic hardcore to embrace elements of screamo and post-rock

Melodic hardcore differentiates itself from standard hardcore punk by incorporating melodic elements such as guitar harmonies, riffs using octave chords, as well as playing the notes of a chord individually in succession, rather than all at once. Bands in the genre also have a tendency to take influence from a range of genres including emo, post-punk, screamo, pop-punk, metalcore, post-rock and gothic rock.

Many melodic hardcore bands put a greater emphasis on lyrical intellectualism than bands in other styles of hardcore. This manifested through politics in the case of bands like Strike Anywhere, and dark, poetic lyrics in the case of bands like American Nightmare and Dead Swans. Concept albums are also common amongst groups including the Carrier and Defeater.

According to Brooklyn Vegan writer Andrew Sacher, "melodic hardcore is not an easy thing to define", due to it encompassing a variety of disparate sounds including the early pop-punk of Descendents, emo of Dag Nasty, skate punk of NOFX, and heavy, nihilistic but tuneful hardcore punk bands like Modern Life Is War and the Hope Conspiracy. In his two articles on the topic, he differentiated between the heavy and nihilistic style based in modern hardcore that he labeled as simply "melodic hardcore" and the more traditional, punk-based "melodic punk" style "that ties together Against Me! to Hot Water Music to Strike Anywhere to the Lawrence Arms". PopMatters writer Ethan Stewart instead suggested that melodic hardcore "as we know it today" began with late 1980s bands like Inside Out and Turning Point who merged youth crew hardcore with emo and tough guy hardcore, due to their influence upon much of the subsequent acts in the genre.

== History ==
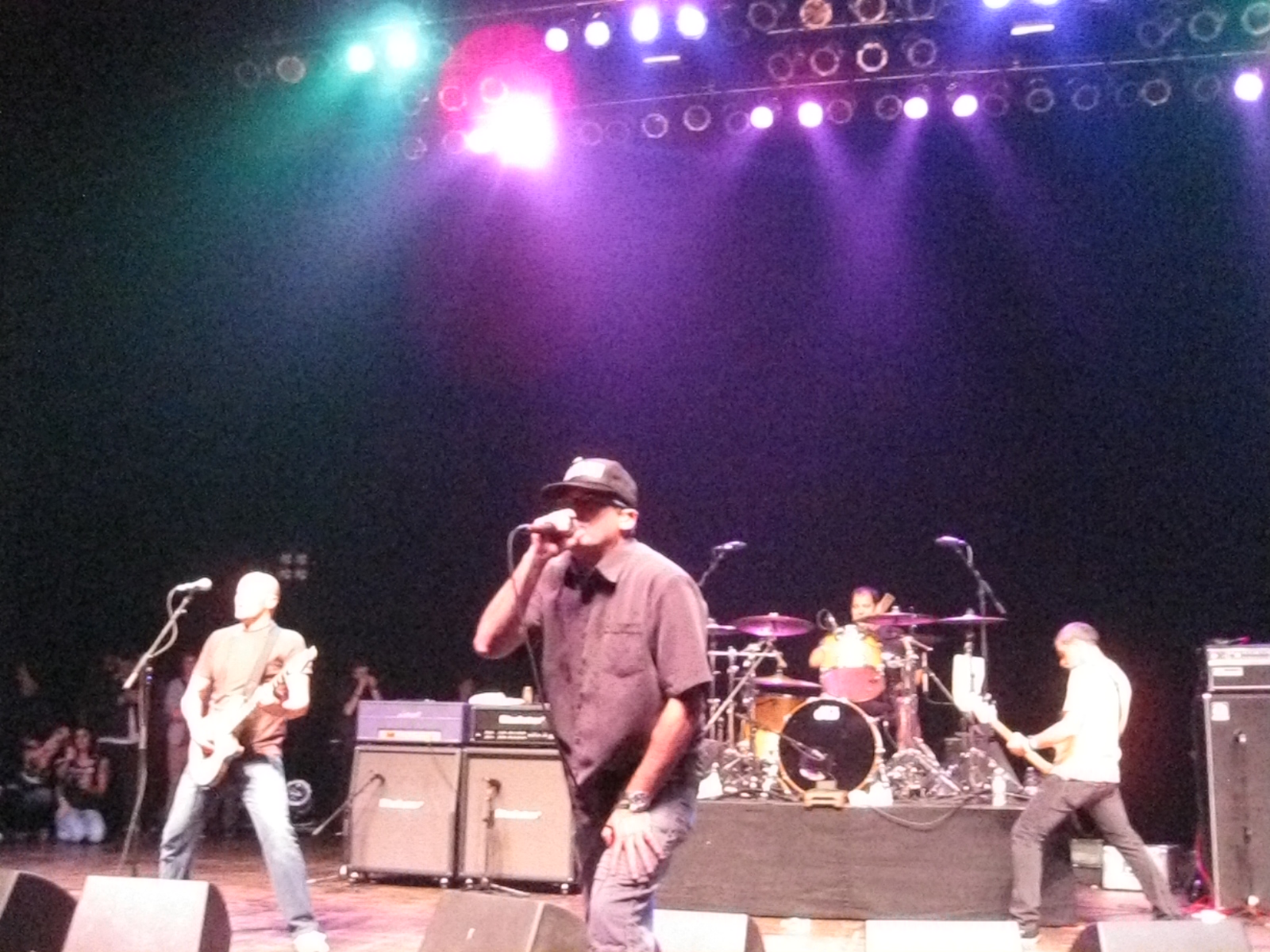
Descendents were a key influence on both melodic hardcore and pop punk in the 1980s.

=== Origins (early to mid–1980s) ===
The earliest melodic hardcore emerged from the Californian hardcore punk scene by the early 1980s. This includes Descendents, who formed in 1978. Their earliest work was simple, pop-influenced punk rock, but they went on to mix this melodic approach with hardcore, inspiring both melodic hardcore and pop punk groups.

The Faith's 1983 EP Subject to Change is one of the first melodic hardcore records. On the release, the band added and moved away from the more straightforward hardcore punk of their earlier work towards a more complex, textured, and melodic sound, accompanied by introspective lyrics; the release is notable for its influence on post-hardcore. Dag Nasty are a key melodic hardcore band that formed during the mid-1980s as part of the Washington, D.C., hardcore scene, with Brian Baker (ex-Minor Threat) on guitar. In 1988, the band All formed, featuring three members of The Descendents. The band made music in a broadly similar vein to the Descendents, and were initially fronted by Dave Smalley of Dag Nasty. 7 Seconds ventured into melodic hardcore on The Crew (1984).

=== Developments (late 1980s to mid–1990s) ===
Bad Religion's 1988 album Suffer was highly influential, pioneering a more melodic take on the pre-existing skate punk genre. The album differentiated itself from the band's earlier hardcore material, by incorporating melodic singing and harmonies. Fat Mike of forefront skate punk band NOFX, called Suffer "the record that changed everything". This style was domineering in the punk scene during the 1990s, being dubbed the "Epi-Fat" sound (named after the labels that housed its key bands, Epitaph Records and Fat Wreck Chords), with key additional bands including Pennywise and Strung Out.

In the mid-1980s, the hardcore subculture youth crew began, which hardcore would go on to be largely intertwined with. One of the earliest bands in the subculture to play a melodic style of hardcore was Gorilla Biscuits. Both California's Inside Out and New Jersey's Turning Point, emerged from this movement, forming in 1988 and disbanding in 1991. Their shared merger of youth crew, emo and tough guy hardcore led to them becoming two of the most influential bands to the subsequent development of melodic hardcore.

In 1994, H_{2}O formed, mixing melodic elements of Washington D.C., with New York and California hardcore punk. Lifetime was a notable emo group whose sound drew heavily on pop punk and melodic hardcore. Along with other melodic hardcore groups, they had much influence on subsequent pop punk, including bands such as Fall Out Boy and Saves the Day. When Lifetime broke up, some of their members formed Kid Dynamite.

=== Popularization (late 1990s to late 2000s) ===
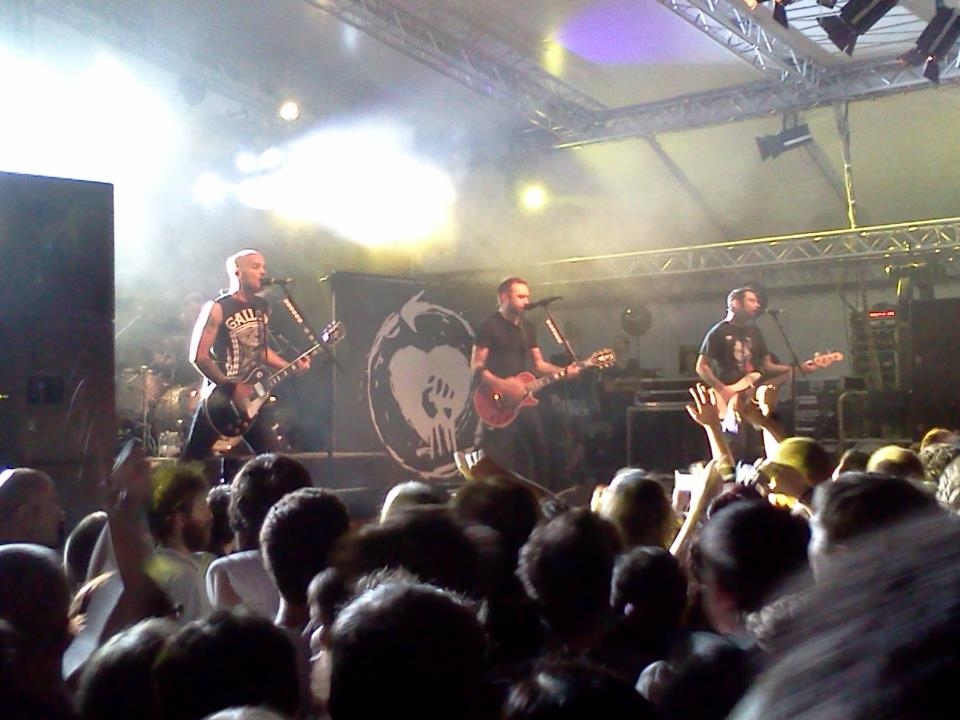
Rise Against, formed in 1999, achieved widespread success by 2004.

For much of the 1990s, the hardcore scene was largely populated by amelodic, extreme metal influenced bands. As a reaction, around 1996, a revival of the sound of the youth crew bands began in Boston. From within this movement, melodic hardcore bands including Bane, In My Eyes and Reach the Sky built upon the foundation that Turning Point and Inside Out has laid out. In the subsequent years, the youth crew revival expanded to other cities and countries. In the San Francisco Bay Area hardcore scene, bands including AFI, Pitch Black, the Nerve Agents and Scissorhands created a separate, melodic outgrowth of youth crew, which merged with horror punk and gothic rock.

The mainstream success of pop-punk in the 2000s led to an increase in commercial success of other melodic styles of punk, including melodic hardcore. This was prominent with Chicago band Rise Against, who formed in 1999, and achieved significant mainstream radio play and MTV coverage, with the release of their major label debut Siren Song of the Counter Culture (2004). Additional bands in the genre to benefit from this were Strike Anywhere, Kid Dynamite, the Movielife and the Suicide Machines.

Growing out of the youth crew revival, Boston band American Nightmare's 2001 debut album Background Music pioneered a new style of melodic hardcore, which callbacked to the 1980s punk-based style of hardcore, while also embracing the influence of the dark lyrics of gothic rock. American Nightmare's influence was apparent promptly leading to a wave bands including Ceremony, Ruiner, Modern Life Is War, the Hope Conspiracy and Killing the Dream. A reaction against American Nightmare's negative melodic hardcore sound soon took place, beginning with Mental, who were quickly followed by Have Heart. Have Heart's success led to the rise in popularity of other positive hardcore groups like Champion, Verse and Sinking Ships. Other prominent groups playing these styles included the Carrier, Ruiner, This Is Hell and Comeback Kid, many of which are housed by key hardcore labels Bridge 9 Records and Deathwish Inc. In western Australia, this sound become one of its most commercially successful exports, with Break Even and Mile Away.

=== Decline and underground developments (late 2000s–present) ===
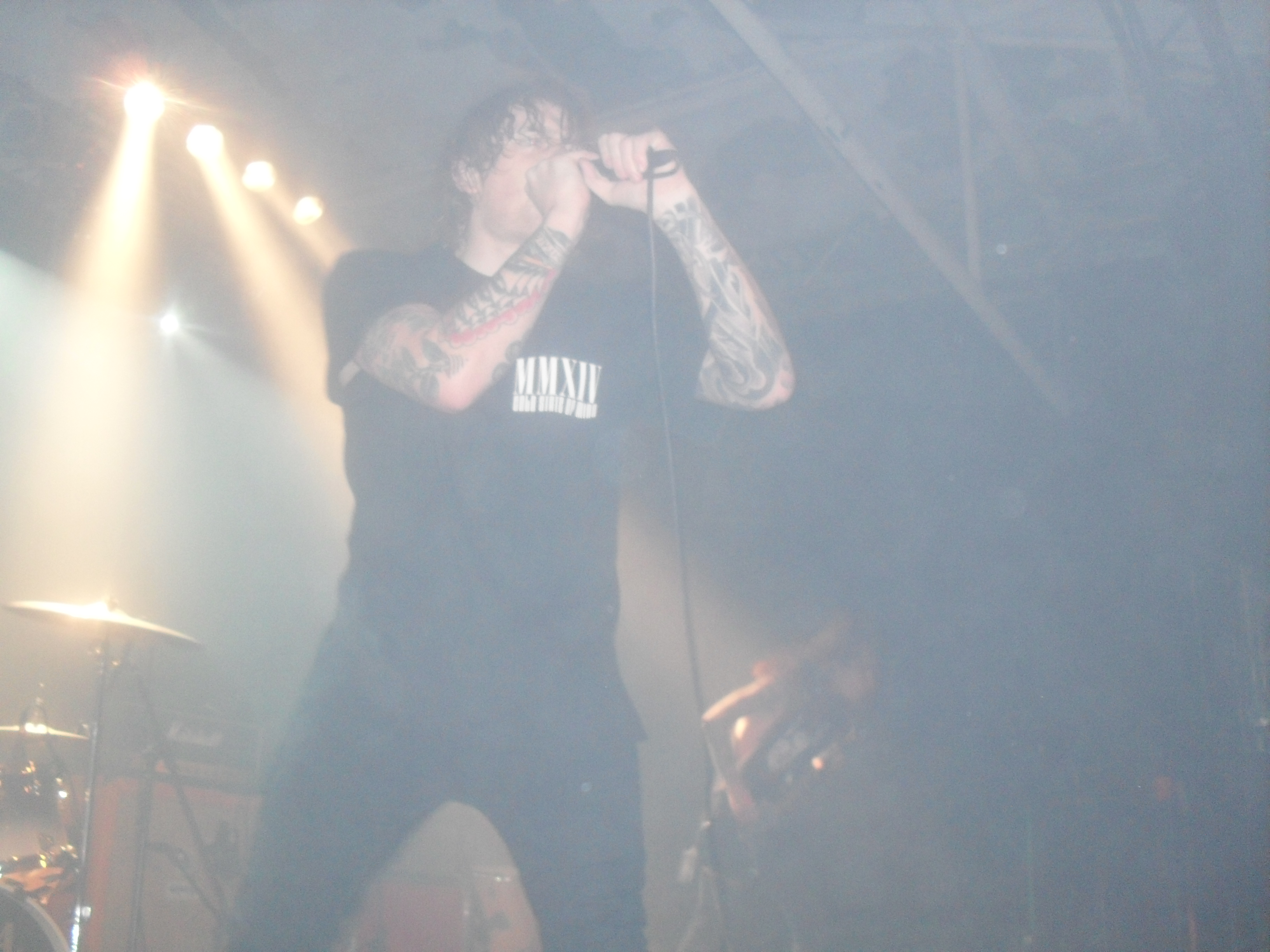
Landscapes helped to initiate the United Kingdom's "golden period of melodic hardcore" in the late 2000s and early 2010s

Melodic hardcore declined in popularity in the American hardcore scene following the release of Trapped Under Ice's debut album Secrets of the World (2009), which repopularized heavier, metal-influenced styles. However, melodic hardcore continued to gain traction in the United Kingdom. This scene's forefront acts included Dead Swans, More Than Life, Heights, Landscapes and Departures. Noizze called this the "golden period of melodic hardcore".

At this time, groups including Defeater and Touché Amoré morphed Bridge Nine and Deathwish's melodic hardcore style into what Alternative Press writer Brian Kraus termed "melodic, emotional hardcore". This sound was a core tennant of the experimental movement the wave. It was typified by emotional lyrics, concept albums and the revival of elements of 1990s emo, screamo and post-hardcore, the movement was originally fronted by Touché Amoré, Defeater, La Dispute, Pianos Become the Teeth and Make Do and Mend.

The United Kingdom's leg of the wave was UKswell, playing a similarly melodic hardcore-indebted style. It originated around 2009, when Pariso, Goodtime Boys, Kerouac, the Long Haul and Bastions began performing together, who all subverted the horror imagery and toxic masculinity of hardcore of the time, seeking radical inclusion. Its initial wave ended in 2012, with the 10 July disbandment of Kerouac. However, a second wave quickly formed with We Never Learned to Live, Employed to Serve, Ithaca, Vales and Svalbard.

==== Srscore ====
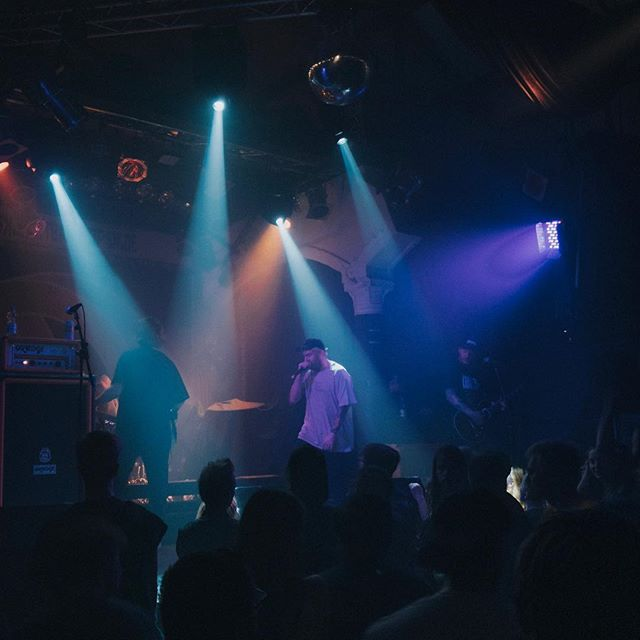
Counterparts were one of the most prominent melodic hardcore bands in the 2010s and pioneers of srscore

During the early 2010s, melodic hardcore gained traction in the metalcore scene, with While She Sleeps in the United Kingdom, Counterparts in Canada, and Hundredth in the United States. This wave of metalcore scene-based groups cross-pollinated melodic hardcore with the melodic but heavy riffing style of metalcore bands such as Shai Hulud and Misery Signals, as well as the aggression of hardcore bands like Terror. This style was largely rejected by the hardcore scene. It incorporated hardcore's energy, metalcore's heavy riffing style, atmospheric elements, gang vocals, melodic lead guitar parts, breakdowns, technical instrumentation and sometimes clean vocals in addition to the commonplace screams. MetalSucks writer Finn McKenty noted it as a more melodic take upon the style of metalcore that Terror played. It put an emphasis on parts of songs conducive to moshing, contrasted by emotional, melodic parts. The emphasis on serious, solemn lyrics led music commentators including Stuff You Will Hate, Alternative Press and Bradley Zorgdrager of Exclaim! to use the name "serious hardcore" or "srscore" to refer to this style. Other names included "meaningful mosh", "melodic moshcore" and "hardcore 4.0.".

The style originated when musicians from the metalcore scene began to take influence from more traditional styles of hardcore. One of the earliest bands in the genre was For The Fallen Dreams from Lansing, Michigan, who began playing deathcore before shifting the sound by the release of their debut album Changes (2008). They inspired a wave of bands to pursue a similar style, including Your Mind Asleep and Delusions. Alternative Press also noted the Ghost Inside as one of the genre's founding acts. It was popularized during the late 2000s and early 2010s, when other forefront bands were Counterparts, Stick to Your Guns and Hundredth. By early 2012, srscore was one of the most prominent sounds in the metalcore scene, overtaking the dominance of Risecore. Around this time, many bands who previously played moshcore shifted their style to srscore, including Liferuiner on their third album, Future Revisionists (2013) and Phinehas. The style continued to grow in prominence into 2015, with Counterparts and the Ghost Inside becoming the most prominent. While She Sleeps were one of the most commercially successful bands to come from this scene, playing sold-out shows across the United Kingdom at venues like Brixton Academy. Their 2017 third album You Are We peaked at number 8 on the UK albums charts. By 2017, Punknews writer Brian Shultz had called the sound "slowly dating". The style declined in popularity following Hundredth's switch to shoegaze on Rare (2017).

==== Other developments ====
Through the 2010s, the wave grew an underground following in the Australia and the United Kingdom, especially Wales. At this time, the YouTube channel Dreambound was one of the most prominent sources for finding bands, uploading music videos for many prominent bands, with this era of the genre being posthumously named "dreamcore". Groups in this scene, often embraced elements of post-rock, and used cleaner and more commercially accessible production styles than had previously been uncommon in the genre. The most prominent act in dreamcore melodic hardcore was Casey from South Wales, with Australian bands Vacant Home and Ambleside too gaining international success. In the later years of this scene, bands began decreasing the influence they took from hardcore, when Crooks, Holding Absence and Endless Height were instead leaning further into post-rock and shoegaze. The 2019 disbandment of Casey led to the end of this era. By the time of Casey's 2023 reunion shows, they had entered a level of cult status which Noizze writer Ethan Young stated made them "one of the most notable melodic hardcore groups of the decade".

During the mid–to late 2010s, another movement reviving youth crew within the hardcore scene began, most prominent in the United States and United Kingdom. Within this movement, was a wave of bands inspired by the Bridge 9 melodic hardcore sound, including True Love, Time and Pressure, If It Rains, Fading Signal, Chemical Fix and Fixation. Other prominent melodic hardcore bands from this time included Mil-Spec, Ghost Fame and No Longer At Ease. Notably, One Step Closer emerged from this wave, originally playing standard youth crew before transitioning into melodic hardcore on their 2017 Promo release. In the 2020s, One Step Closer became one of the forefront bands in the hardcore scene, their success leading to the increased prominence of additional bands in the genre including Fiddlehead, Anxious and Koyo.

== See also ==
- List of melodic hardcore bands
- Skate punk
- Emo
- Pop-punk
- Youth crew
- Positive hardcore
- Melodic metalcore
- Post-hardcore
