= List of post-hardcore bands =

This is a list of notable musical artists who have been referred to or have had their music described as post-hardcore.

Post-hardcore is a punk rock music genre that maintains the aggression and intensity of hardcore punk but emphasizes a greater degree of creative expression initially inspired by post-punk and noise rock. The genre took shape in the mid- to late 1980s with releases by bands from cities that had established hardcore scenes, such as Fugazi from Washington, D.C., as well as groups such as Big Black and Jawbox that stuck closer to post-hardcore's noise rock roots.

== List ==
=== 0–9 ===
- 36 Crazyfists
- 9mm Parabellum Bullet

=== A ===
- Acres
- Adept
- AFI
- Aiden
- Akissforjersey
- Alesana
- Alexisonfire
- Alive Like Me
- American Standards
- The Amity Affliction
- Anatomy of a Ghost
- ...And You Will Know Us by the Trail of Dead
- Annisokay
- The Appleseed Cast
- The Armed
- Armor for Sleep
- As Cities Burn
- As Everything Unfolds
- Asking Alexandria
- At the Drive-In
- Atreyu
- Attack Attack!
- AWS

=== B ===
- Balance and Composure
- Bastions
- Bastro
- Bear vs. Shark
- Beartooth
- The Beautiful Mistake
- Bedlight for Blue Eyes
- Before Their Eyes
- Being as an Ocean
- Beloved
- Biffy Clyro
- Big Black
- Billy Talent
- Birds in Row
- Bitch Magnet
- Black Eyes
- Black Veil Brides
- The Blackout
- Bleed the Dream
- The Bled
- Blessthefall
- Blindside
- The Blood Brothers
- Bluetip
- Bob Tilton
- Box Car Racer
- Boys Night Out
- BoySetsFire
- Brand New
- Bring Me the Horizon
- Brutus
- The Bunny the Bear
- Burden of a Day
- Burning Airlines
- Burst
- Bury Tomorrow

=== C ===
- Calva Louise
- Cap'n Jazz
- The Casket Lottery
- Caskets
- Cast Iron Hike
- Catch Your Breath
- Cave In
- Celeste
- The Chariot
- Chasing Victory
- Chavez
- Chiodos
- Chunk! No, Captain Chunk!
- Circa Survive
- Circle Takes The Square
- Circus Lupus
- City of Caterpillar
- Classic Case
- Cloud Nothings
- Code Orange
- Coheed and Cambria
- Coldrain
- Colorblind
- The Color Morale
- Confide
- Converge
- Counterfeit
- Crooks
- Crown the Empire
- The Crownhate Ruin
- Cry of the Afflicted
- Cursive

=== D ===
- Dance Club Massacre
- Dance Gavin Dance
- Dark Divine
- Dashboard Confessional
- Dayseeker
- Dayshell
- A Day to Remember
- Dead and Divine
- Dealing With Damage
- Dead Poetic
- Deaf Havana
- Deftones
- Delaire the Liar
- Destroy Rebuild Until God Shows
- Devil Sold His Soul
- The Devil Wears Prada
- Disco Ensemble
- The Dismemberment Plan
- Dizmas
- Dogleg
- Don Broco
- Dream On, Dreamer
- Dream State
- Drive Like Jehu
- Drop Dead, Gorgeous
- Drowningman
- Drug Church

=== E ===
- Eat Me Raw
- Edison Glass
- The Effigies
- Egg Hunt
- Emarosa
- Embrace
- Emery
- Engine Down
- Enter Shikari
- Envy
- Envy on the Coast
- Escape the Fate
- Every Time I Die
- Everyone Dies in Utah
- Eyes Set to Kill

=== F ===
- The Fall of Troy
- Falling in Reverse
- Famous Last Words
- Far
- Faraquet
- Fear Before
- The Felix Culpa
- Fever 333
- Fiddlehead
- Fighting with Wire
- Fightstar
- Finch
- Fireside
- Fjørt
- Flee the Seen
- Flyleaf
- For All Those Sleeping
- Four Letter Lie
- Four Year Strong
- Framing Hanley
- Frodus
- From Autumn to Ashes
- From First to Last
- Fucked Up
- Fugazi
- Funeral for a Friend
- Future Palace

=== G ===
- Garden Variety
- Gatherers
- The Getaway Plan
- Get Scared
- Girls Against Boys
- Glamour of the Kill
- Glasseater
- Glassjaw
- Good Tiger
- Goodtime Boys
- Grade
- Greeley Estates

=== H ===
- Hail the Sun
- Hands Like Houses
- Handsome
- Hawthorne Heights
- He Is Legend
- Heaven in Her Arms
- Hell Is for Heroes
- Helmet
- Hidden in Plain View
- High Vis
- Holding Absence
- Hoover
- Hopes Die Last
- Hopesfall
- Hot Snakes
- Hot Water Music
- Hundred Reasons
- Hum

=== I ===
- I Am Empire
- I Am Ghost
- I Am the Avalanche
- I Prevail
- I See Stars
- I Set My Friends on Fire
- I the Mighty
- Icarus the Owl
- Ice Nine Kills
- Idiot Pilot
- Imminence
- Indian Summer
- In Fear and Faith
- Inch
- Inhale Exhale
- Isles & Glaciers

=== J ===
- Jamie's Elsewhere
- Jawbox
- The Jesus Lizard
- The Jonbenét
- June of 44
- Just Surrender

=== K ===
- Karate
- Karate High School
- Karp
- KEN Mode
- The Kinison
- Knapsack

=== L ===
- La Dispute
- Lastelle
- Leathermouth
- Letlive
- Ling Tosite Sigure
- Lostprophets
- A Lot Like Birds
- Lovehatehero
- Lowercase
- Lower Than Atlantis
- Lower Definition
- Lungfish
- Lync

=== M ===
- Madina Lake
- Majority Rule
- Makari
- Mallory Knox
- Marmozets
- Mclusky
- Means
- Memphis May Fire
- The Men
- MewithoutYou
- Microwave
- Milemarker
- Million Dead
- Mínus
- Misery Signals
- Modern Error
- Mohinder
- Moneen
- Monty Are I
- Moss Icon
- Movements
- My Chemical Romance
- My Epic
- My First Story
- My Ticket Home

=== N ===
- Naked Raygun
- Narrows
- The Nation of Ulysses
- Neurosis
- Nomeansno
- Norma Jean
- Not Enough Space

=== O ===
- Oathbreaker
- Oceana
- Of Mice & Men
- Old Gray
- On the Last Day
- On the Might of Princes
- One Ok Rock
- Open Hand
- Orange 9mm
- Orchid
- Our Last Night
- Our Mirage
- Outline in Color

=== P ===
- Palisades
- Petrol Girls
- Parting Gift
- Penknifelovelife
- Pg.99
- Phoxjaw
- Pianos Become the Teeth
- Picture Me Broken
- Pierce the Veil
- Pile
- Pitchfork
- Planes Mistaken for Stars
- The Plot to Blow Up the Eiffel Tower
- Poison the Well
- Polar Bear Club
- Project 86
- Protest the Hero
- Pulled Apart by Horses
- Pvris

=== Q ===
- Q and Not U
- Quicksand

=== R ===
- Rapeman
- The Receiving End of Sirens
- The Red Jumpsuit Apparatus
- Refused
- Rites of Spring
- Rival Schools
- Rodan
- Rollins Band
- Rolo Tomassi
- Rosaline
- Rye Coalition

=== S ===
- Saccharine Trust
- Sainthood Reps
- Saosin
- Scary Kids Scaring Kids
- Scratch Acid
- Seahaven
- Secret and Whisper
- Secrets
- Self Defense Family
- Senses Fail
- Sent by Ravens
- Shellac
- Shiner
- Showbread
- Show Me the Body
- Shudder to Think
- Silent Planet
- Silverstein
- Six Finger Satellite
- Sky Eats Airplane
- A Skylit Drive
- The Sleeping
- Sleeping with Sirens
- Slint
- Small Brown Bike
- Smart Went Crazy
- Soulside
- The Sound of Animals Fighting
- Sparta
- Standstill
- State Faults
- Static Dress
- A Static Lullaby
- Story of the Year
- Stutterfly
- Sunny Day Real Estate
- Svalbard
- Swing Kids
- Sworn In

=== T ===
- Taking Back Sunday
- Tera Melos
- Texas Is the Reason
- These Arms Are Snakes
- These Hearts
- Thousand Below
- Thrice
- Thursday
- Tides of Man
- Tiny Moving Parts
- Title Fight
- Too Close to Touch
- Touché Amoré
- Trenchmouth
- Trophy Scars

=== U ===
- Underoath
- Universal Order of Armageddon
- Unsane
- Unwound
- The Used

=== V ===
- Vampires Everywhere!
- The Van Pelt
- Vanna
- Vaux
- Vendetta Red
- The Venetia Fair
- Versa
- The VSS

=== W ===
- Wage War
- Wargasm
- The Warmers
- Waterdown
- We Are the Ocean
- We Came as Romans
- We Never Learned to Live
- The White Noise
- Will Haven
- Wind Walkers
- Wolf & Bear
- Wolves at the Gate
- The Word Alive

=== Y ===
- Yashin
- Yesterdays Rising
- YouInSeries
- You Me at Six
- Young Guns
- Young Widows
- Yourcodenameis:milo

== See also ==
- List of emo artists
- List of metalcore bands
- List of post-punk bands
- List of punk bands: 0–K, L–Z
- List of screamo bands
