= List of emo artists =

Musical artists associated with emo subculture

This is a list of notable musical artists associated with the music genre and/or subculture of emo.

Emo is a style of rock music characterized by melodic musicianship and expressive, often confessional lyrics. It originated in the mid-1980s hardcore punk movement of Washington, D.C., where it was known as "emotional hardcore" or "emocore" and pioneered by bands such as Rites of Spring and Embrace. As the style was echoed by contemporary American punk rock bands, its sound and meaning shifted and changed, blending with pop punk and indie rock and encapsulated in the early 1990s by groups such as Jawbreaker and Sunny Day Real Estate. By the mid-1990s numerous emo acts had emerged from the Midwestern and Central United States, and several independent record labels began to specialize in the style.

Emo broke into mainstream culture in the early 2000s with the sales success of Jimmy Eat World and Dashboard Confessional, with the genre's popularity continuing in the mid-to-late 2000s with bands such as My Chemical Romance, Fall Out Boy, and the Red Jumpsuit Apparatus.

== List ==
=== A ===
- The Academy Is...
- Acceptance
- Ace Troubleshooter
- Acres
- AFI
- Aiden
- Alesana
- Alexisonfire
- Alkaline Trio
- The All-American Rejects
- All Time Low
- The Almost
- Amber Pacific
- American Football
- Anasarca
- Anberlin
- And Then There Were None
- ...And You Will Know Us by the Trail of Dead
- The Anniversary
- Anxious
- The Appleseed Cast
- Armor for Sleep
- As Cities Burn
- At the Drive-In
- August is Falling
- Avion Roe

=== B ===
- Bayside
- The Beautiful Mistake
- Beefeater
- Before Their Eyes
- Beloved
- Benton Falls
- Birdskulls
- Black Veil Brides
- Bloody Knees
- Bob Tilton
- Boys Like Girls
- Boys Night Out
- Braid
- Brand New
- The Brave Little Abacus
- Bring Me the Horizon
- Broccoli

=== C ===
- The Cab
- Capital Lights
- Cap'n Jazz
- Chamberlain
- Chasing Victory
- Christie Front Drive
- City of Caterpillar
- The Classic Crime
- Cobra Starship
- Coheed and Cambria
- Crooks
- Cute Is What We Aim For

=== D ===
- Dads
- Dag Nasty
- Dashboard Confessional
- A Day to Remember
- Dead Poetic
- Dear Ephesus
- Death Cab for Cutie
- Delaire the Liar
- The Dismemberment Plan
- Dizmas
- Drive Like Jehu

=== E ===
- Edison Glass
- Eisley
- Elliott
- Emanuel
- Embrace
- Emery
- Empire! Empire! (I Was a Lonely Estate)
- Escape the Fate
- Ever Stays Red
- Every Avenue
- Everyone Asked About You
- Eyes Set to Kill

=== F ===
- Fall Out Boy
- Falling in Reverse
- Falling Up
- Family Force 5
- Farewell, My Love
- Finch
- Fire Party
- Fireflight
- Flyleaf
- The Fold
- Forever Changed
- Forever the Sickest Kids
- Foxing
- Fragile Rock
- The Fray
- From Autumn to Ashes
- From First to Last
- Funeral for a Friend
- Further Seems Forever

=== G ===
- Garden Variety
- Get Scared
- The Get Up Kids
- Glassjaw
- Goodtime Boys
- Gray Matter
- Gwen Stacy

=== H ===
- Haste the Day
- Hawk Nelson
- Hawthorne Heights
- He Is Legend
- Hellogoodbye
- Hey Mercedes
- Hey Monday
- The Higher
- Hindsights
- Hoover
- Hot Rod Circuit
- The Hotelier
- House of Heroes

=== I ===
- I Am Ghost
- I'm Glad It's You
- Ida
- Indian Summer
- Ivoryline

=== J ===
- Jane Air
- Jawbreaker
- Jets to Brazil
- Jetty Bones
- Jimmy Eat World
- Joan of Arc
- The Juliana Theory
- The Junior Varsity

=== K ===
- Karate
- Kids in the Way
- Knapsack
- Koyo
- Kutless

=== L ===
- Letter Kills
- LoveHateHero
- Life in Your Way
- Lifetime
- Lostprophets

=== M ===
- Mae
- The Maine
- Matchbook Romance
- Mayday Parade
- Metro Station
- Krystal Meyers
- Mineral
- Modern Baseball
- Modern Error
- Mom Jeans
- Moneen
- Moose Blood
- Moss Icon
- More Than Life
- The Movielife
- My Chemical Romance

=== N ===
- Native Nod
- New Found Glory
- Noise Ratchet
- Northstar
- Nude
- Number One Gun

=== O ===
- Ogbert the Nerd
- One Ok Rock
- Once Nothing
- Origami Angel
- Our Last Night

=== P ===
- Panic! at the Disco
- Paramore
- Parting Gift
- Pg. 99
- Philmont
- Pierce the Veil
- Pillar
- Plain White T's
- Pool Kids
- Pop Unknown
- The Promise Ring
- Punchline

=== R ===
- Rainer Maria
- The Red Jumpsuit Apparatus
- Rites of Spring
- Roses Are Red
- Rye Coalition

=== S ===
- Saetia
- Samiam
- Saosin
- Saves the Day
- Say Anything
- Secondhand Serenade
- Secret and Whisper
- Senses Fail
- Sherwood
- Showbread
- Silverstein
- Simple Plan
- Small Brown Bike
- Sleeping with Sirens
- Something Corporate
- Spanish Love Songs
- The Spill Canvas
- Split Lip
- Squirrel Bait
- Static Dress
- The Starting Line
- Stavesacre
- Story of the Year
- Sunny Day Real Estate

=== T ===
- Taking Back Sunday
- Ten Second Epic
- Texas Is the Reason
- There for Tomorrow
- Thirty Seconds to Mars
- This Beautiful Republic
- This Providence
- Twenty One Pilots
- Thrice
- Thursday
- Tokio Hotel
- Typecast

=== U ===
- Underoath
- The Used

=== V ===
- The Van Pelt
- Vs Self

=== W ===
- Wallflower
- Watashi Wa
- The Wedding
- Weezer
- The World Is a Beautiful Place & I Am No Longer Afraid to Die

=== Y ===
- You, Me, and Everyone We Know

== See also ==
- List of screamo bands
- List of emo pop bands
- List of emo rap artists
- List of post-hardcore bands
