= The wave (music) =

Loosely-defined collective of post-hardcore bands

- Branch: Post-hardcore
- Years active: 2008–2015
- Location: United States, United Kingdom
- Influences: Screamo; melodic hardcore; post-rock; emo; literature
- Influenced: Dreamcore

The wave or the new wave of post-hardcore (TNWOPH) was a loosely-defined collective of post-hardcore bands and the movement that spawned around them. Taking place between roughly 2008 and 2015, it was founded by Defeater, La Dispute, Make Do and Mend, Pianos Become the Teeth and Touché Amoré.

The movement was a reaction against the commerciality of the pop screamo sound, which had dominated the post-hardcore scene for much of the 2000s. In response, bands in the wave embraced the influence of screamo, melodic hardcore and post-rock, as well as literary forms, often spoken word. By 2012, the wave had come to encompass a spectrum of bands that were similar to, influenced by or friends with the founding acts of the movement. This included contemporary screamo bands State Faults, the Saddest Landscape, Frameworks and Caravels, bands also in the emo revival such as Balance and Composure, Title Fight and Tigers Jaw, blackgaze band Deafheaven, and Britain's UKswell movement, which included the Goodtime Boys and Bastions.

The wave declined in 2015, when Touché Amoré, La Dispute and Pianos Become the Teeth entered hiatuses. By this point, its influence had repopularized melodic hardcore, pushed many bands to embrace the influence of post-rock and pioneered the dreamcore genre.

== Etymology ==
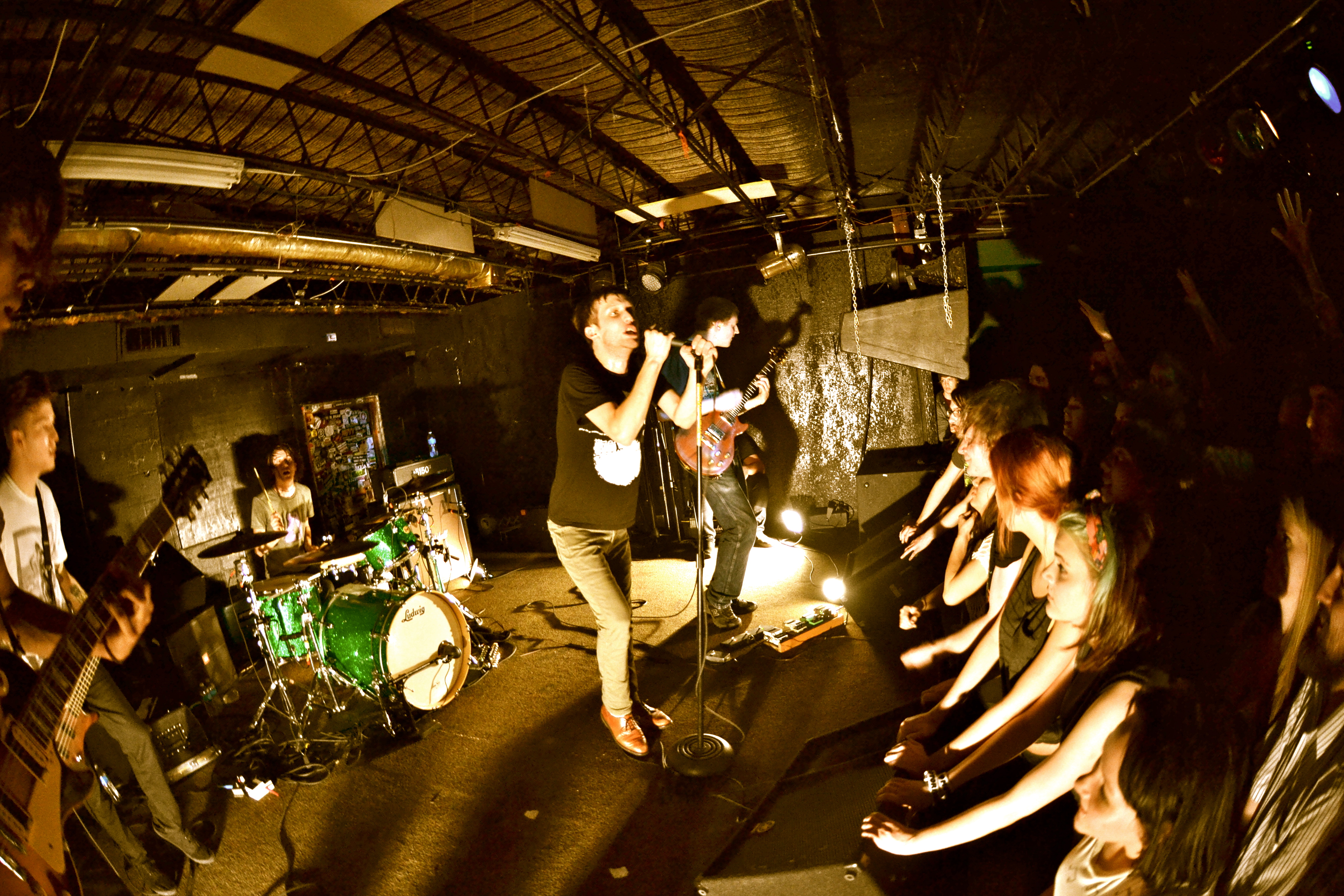
La Dispute were of the wave's founding acts.

The term "The Wave" was initially coined as an inside joke. This self-descriptor encompassed only Touché Amoré, La Dispute, Defeater, Pianos Become the Teeth and Make Do and Mend, who believed that collectively, they were similar to the group of bands that made up Revolution Summer. Brad Vander Lugt of La Dispute commented on how the term has been interpreted with more serious attitude from people, saying: "people just ran with it and some kids took it really seriously, like we were trying to create some kind of collective, which it wasn't at all. But we are really good friends with all of those bands. They're like brothers to us and I think, in that way, it is a collective." Overland called it a "tree house club".

The movement ran parallel to the emo revival, and as, around 2013, the definition of "emo revival" expanded, some of the major groups in the wave began to also be considered a part of the emo revival.

== Characteristics ==
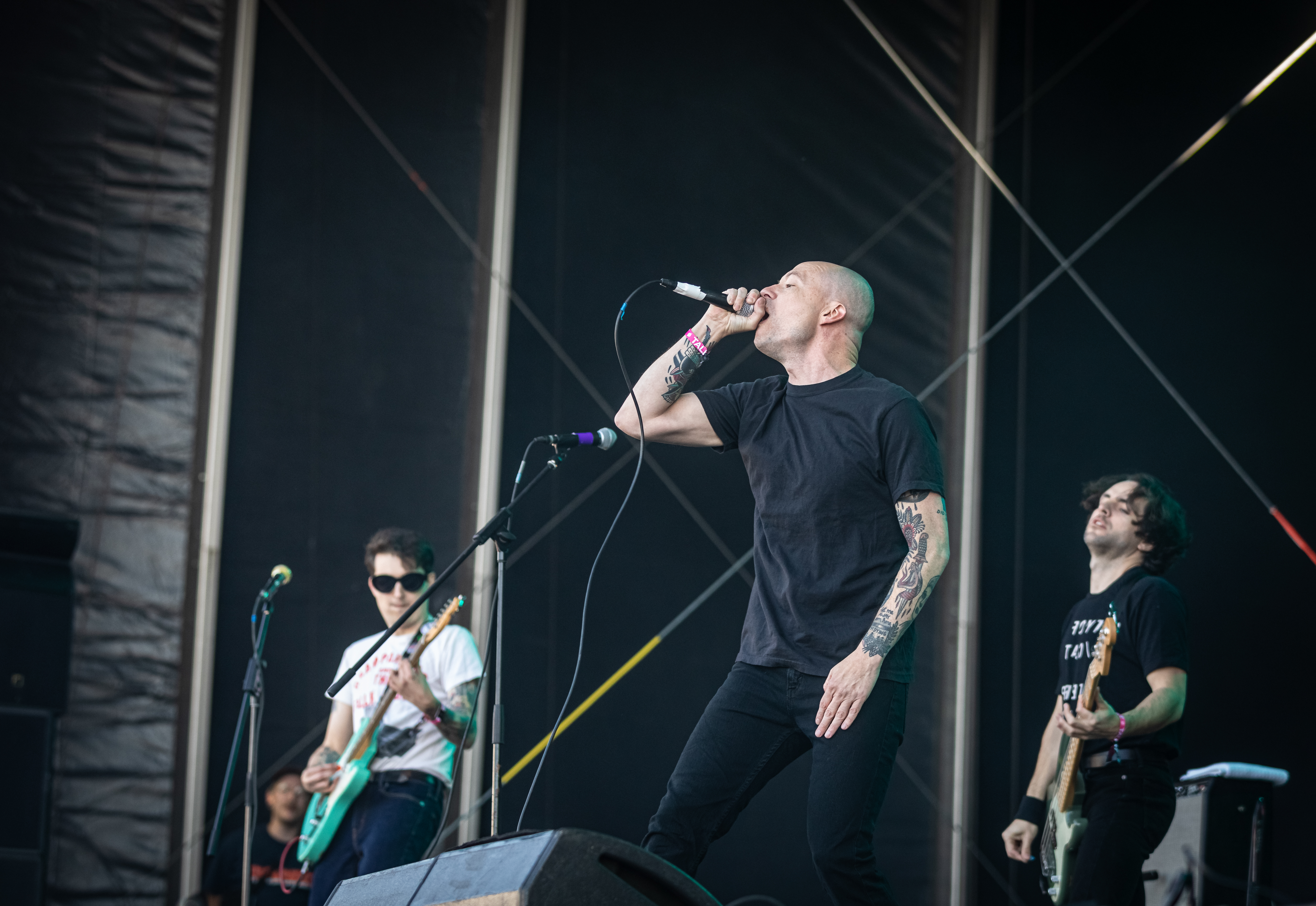
Touché Amoré helped to establish the core sound of the wave by merging screamo, melodic hardcore and post-rock.

Bands in the wave were largely reviving 1990s emo, screamo and post-hardcore sounds, with some instead playing pop-punk and punk rock. The Guardian described the wave as having heavy lyrical emphasis, in a way reminiscent of 1990s emo

When used as a genre label, the wave encompasses an "overwrought" style of emo that combines elements of melodic hardcore, screamo and post-rock. It makes use of screamed vocals and ambient soundscapes within the context of 1990s-style screamo. Many bands disregarded the conventional boundaries of hardcore at the time, instead embracing outside influences and touring with groups of different genres. Stereogum writer Ellie Kovach described it as "the sonic cross-section of uncompromisingly independent and abrasive '90s hardcore and the kind of warmly melodic sensibilities and accessible vulnerability that had turned emo into an explosive juggernaut at the turn of the century." Veil of Sound noted it as having an "affinity with adding many little twists and elements in order to maintain a certain unpredictability". Treblezine writer Tom Morgan called the term "nebulous" because "The bands it encompassed were just too disparate", noting their major similarities as being their experimentalism, their use of melodrama and their difficulty to categorize into established music genres.

== History ==
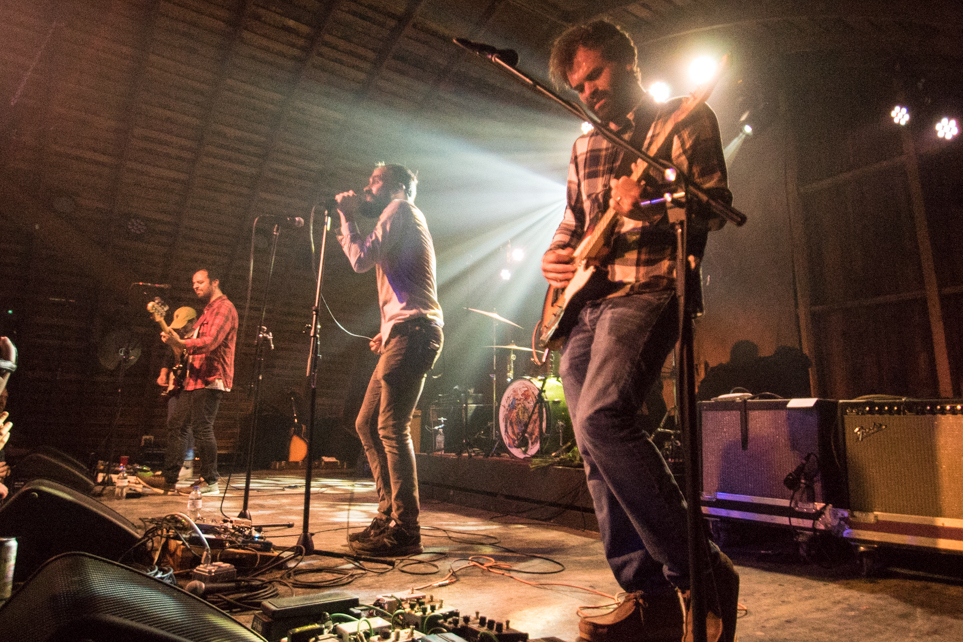
mewithoutYou influenced many of the wave's founding bands.

=== Origins ===
During the 2000s, post-hardcore had developed from an experimental DIY hardcore punk genre into what Stereogum writer Ellie Kovach called "a meaningless term... codified and commodified into something sleek and polished, the likes of which hardcore had initially willed itself into existence to spite." The wave was a rejection of these developments, which Jeremy Bolm of Touché Amoré described as "years of awful, awful, awful insincere garbage that has taken over everything for so long now and I'd like to hope that it's starting to get weeded out…you know, like, the terrible swoop hair, rock star attitude, bullshit breakdown bands that have nothing to really offer anybody".

The wave grew out of the more literary side of 2000s melodic hardcore, where Last Lights and the Carrier were writing concept albums. Alternative Press noted the movement's immediate precursors as including the Carrier, Killing the Dream, Ruiner, Life Long Tragedy, Comeback Kid, With Honor, Modern Life is War, Sinking Ships, Guns Up!, Go It Alone, This is Hell, the Hope Conspiracy, Verse, Have Heart, I Rise and Soul Control. Mewithoutyou were also a major influence upon the bands who would form the wave.

The wave's founding acts were spread across the United States, with Touché Amoré in Los Angeles, Pianos Become the Teeth in Baltimore, La Dispute in Grand Rapids, Michigan and Defeater and Make Do and Mend in Boston. In 2008, these groups began to book live performances for each other in their hometowns.

=== Developments ===
The movement hit its stride around 2011. That year, Alternative Press noted that La Dispute is "at the forefront of a traditional-screamo revival" for their critically acclaimed release Wildlife, while a 2014 article by Treble called Touché Amoré "the one band carrying the sound forward in the most interesting ways". The immediate legacy of Wildlife has been noted as there has been a "huge influx" of 'melodic post hardcore' bands, particularly in the United States. The scene soon became centered on the record label Deathwish Inc..

By 2012, additional bands adopted into the collective were All Teeth, Balance and Composure, Comadre, Deafheaven, Former Thieves, Into It. Over It., Living With Lions, Seahaven, Tigers Jaw and Title Fight, as well as many new screamo bands including the Saddest Landscape, Frameworks, My Iron Lung, Departures, Caravels and State Faults. That year, the reunion of Modern Life is War and the widespread commercial success of Deafheaven's album Sunbather (2013), led increased attention to come to the movement.

=== UKswell ===
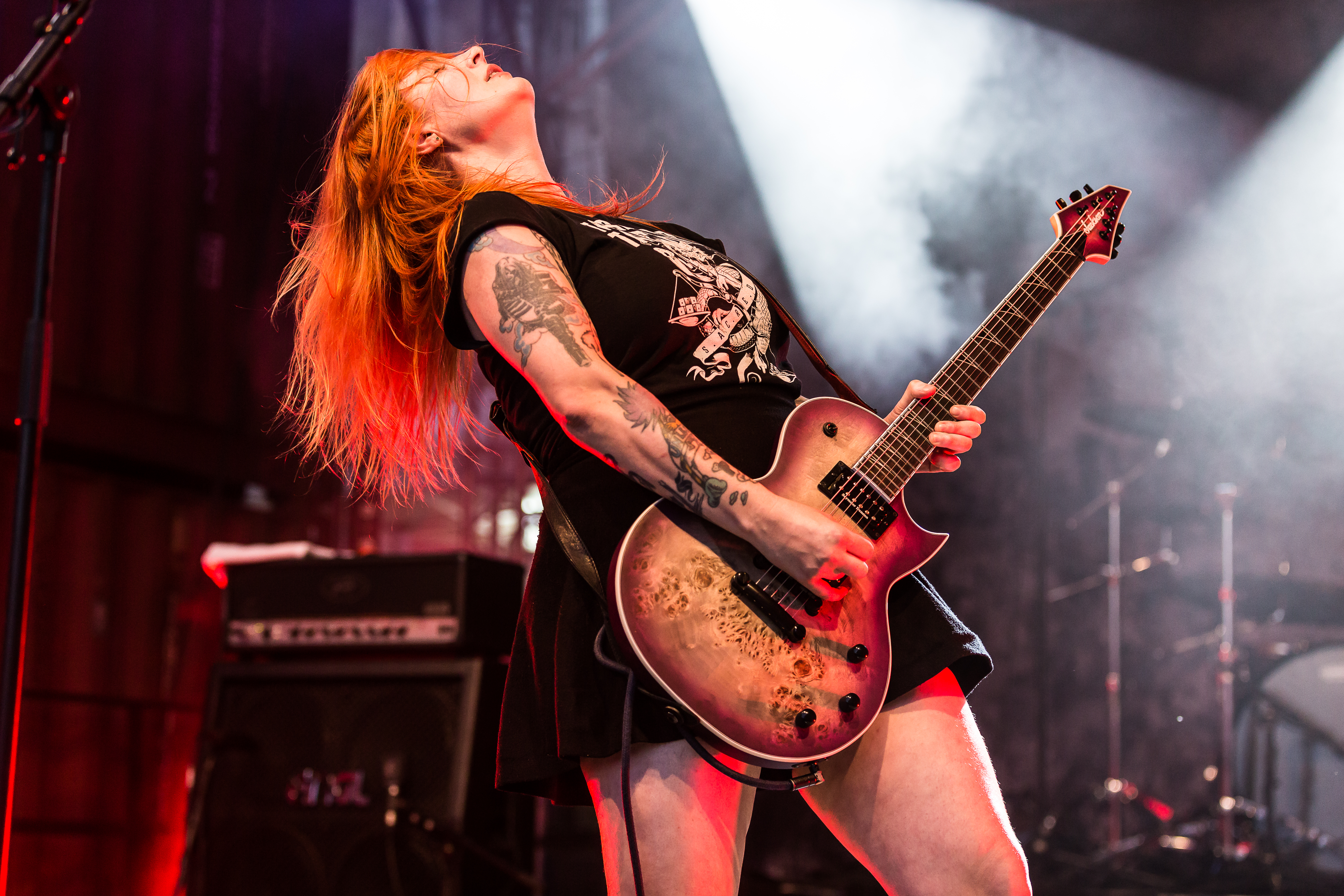
Svalbard, a later UKswell band

UKswell was the UK hardcore leg of the wave. Bands in the movement additionally took influence from Young Widows, November Coming Fire and Converge. Centred on Holy Roar Records, it stylistically encompassed an "overwrought" style of emo that subverted the conventions of the genre. It opposed the growing influence of metal upon hardcore, and was characterized by angry, depressive and sentimental post-hardcore, melodic hardcore and energetic and sincere screamo.

It began around 2009, when Pariso, Goodtime Boys, Kerouac, the Long Haul and Bastions began performing together, who all subverted the horror imagery and toxic masculinity of hardcore of the time, seeking radical inclusion. As a concept, it was devised in 2010 by the members of Bastions and Pariso. Its name was coined as a joke by Pariso guitarist Stuart Anderson in reference to the wave. By 2011, its core was Goodtime Boys, Kerouac, the Long Haul, Pariso and Bastions, with other bands in the movement including Ohhms, Old Skin, Stallone, Human Future, Artemis, Grappler, Witch Cult, Brontide, Jackals, Hush, run,WALK, Crocus and Plaids. Its initial wave ended in 2012, with the 10 July disbandment of Kerouac. Though a second wave quickly formed with We Never Learned to Live, Employed to Serve, Ithaca, Vales and Svalbard.

== Decline and legacy ==
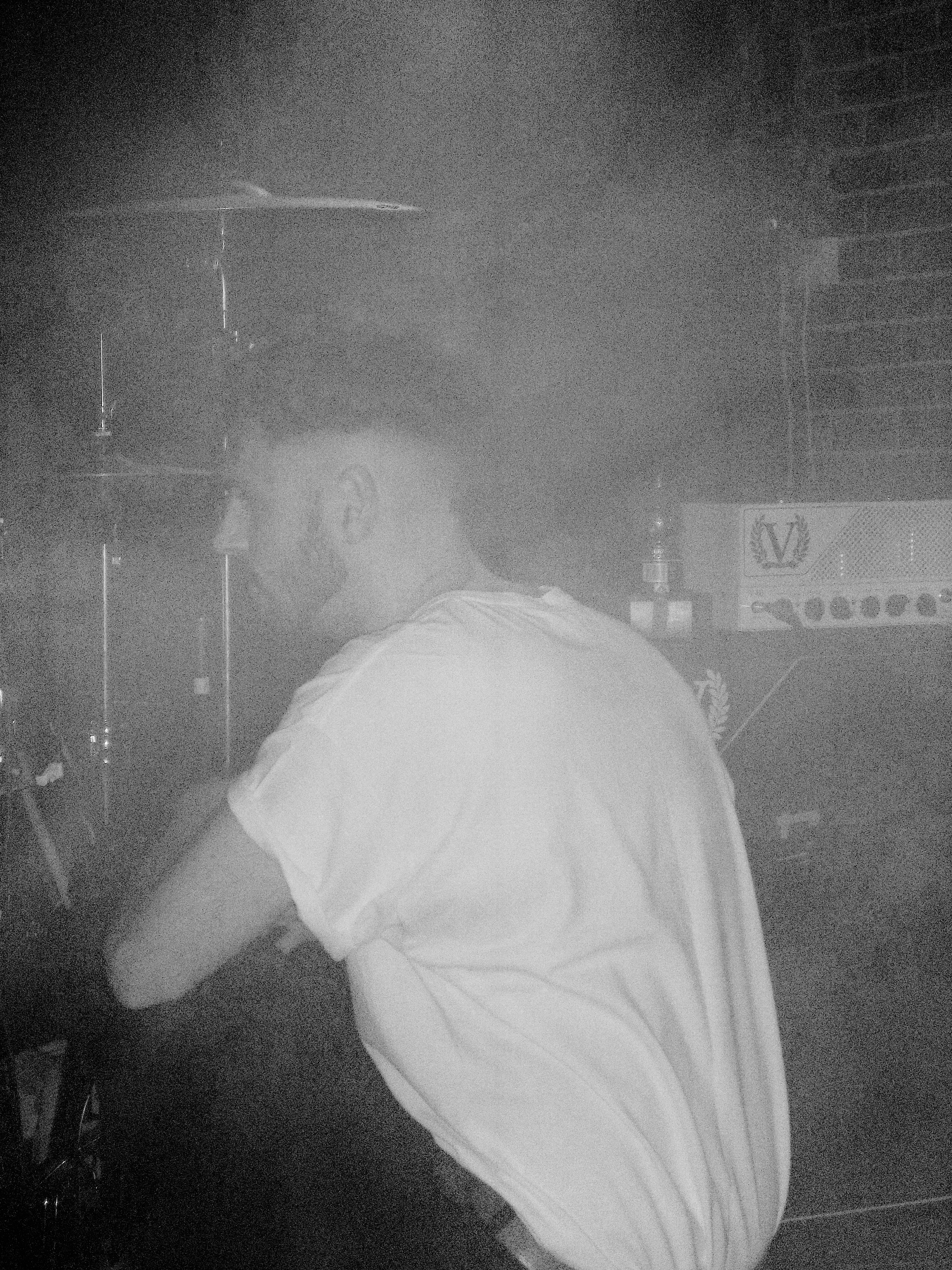
Casey, a prominent band influenced by the wave, who was forefront in the wave-inspired genre dreamcore

The movement reached its peak around 2014. The following year, Touché Amoré, La Dispute and Pianos Become the Teeth entered hiatuses. Because of the wave, post-rock influence became a core tennant of emo in the 2010s, with many bands playing other genres also incorporating elements of it into their style, including More Than Life. The wave coincided with the srscore wave of melodic hardcore, which was fronted by Counterparts, the Ghost Inside and Hundredth. Together, these waves led to a repopularization of melodic hardcore in the 2010s. In 2013, Punknews characterised the sound of "modern hardcore" as being derived from the wave.

By 2021, Stereogum writer Ellie Kovach stated that many of the bands in the wave "are borderline household names now". Punknews noted One Step Closer's second album All You Embrace (2024) as similar to the wave.

=== Dreamcore ===
During the 2010s, the wave was influential upon many groups in Australia and the United Kingdom, especially Wales. Groups in these scenes often made use of expansive, reverb-heavy soundscapes, put a greater emphasis on the influence of post-rock, and used cleaner and more commercially accessible production styles than had previously been common in the genre. This new genre gained the name "dreamcore" (or "Dreambound melodic hardcore") in reference to the Youtube channel Dreambound, which was a central source for finding music, due to uploading music videos for many bands in the genre.

The most prominent act in dreamcore was Casey from South Wales, with Australian bands Vacant Home and Ambleside too gaining international success. By the late 2010s, many dreamcore acts began decreasing the influence they took from hardcore, when Crooks, Holding Absence and Parting Gift were instead leaning further into post-rock and shoegaze. Following the 2019 disbandment of Casey, dreamcore declined, with acts from the scene such as Static Dress, Dream State, Acres and Killing Me Softly pursuing different sounds. Dreamcore experienced a resurgence of popularity in the mid-2020s, following the reunion of Casey, Love is Noise's switch to the genre on To Live in a Different Way (2025) and new acts including Lastelle, Lonesome, Exit Dream and Colorblind.
