= More Than Life (band) =

British hardcore punk band (2006–2016)

- Also known as: Basics
- Origin: Bath, Somerset, UK
- Genres: Melodic hardcore; emo; post-rock
- Years active: 2006–2016
- Labels: Purgatory; Holy Roar; Day by Day; Anchors Aweigh
- Spinoffs: Svalbard
- Past members: James Matthews; Joel Peets; Joey Bayes; Tony Klein; Bobby Daniels

More Than Life (originally Basics) were an English hardcore punk band formed in Bath, Somerset. Formed in 2006 by James Matthews (vocals), Joel Peets (guitar), Joey Bayes (guitar), Bobby Daniels (bass) and Tony Klein (drums), they self-released their debut EP Prelude the following year. In 2008, its followup Brave Enough to Fail was released through Day Records and Anchors Aweigh Records. They released their debut album, Love Let Me Go in 2011. The releases were widely influential, helping to establish a major wave of melodic hardcore in Britain in the 2010s. In 2011, they announced they would disband the following year, however by October 2012 had decided to continue as a band. On their second album What's Left Of Me (2014), they shifted their sound towards post-rock. They disbanded in 2016.

== History ==
Originally named Basics, More Than Life was founded in 2006, consisting of singer James Matthews, the two guitarists Joel Peets and Joey Bayes, bassist Bobby Daniels and drummer Tony Klein. The name More Than Life was taken from the song "Angel, Angel, Down We Go Together" by Morrissey. In 2007, the Prelude EP was released on CD and cassette. This was self-financed. The following year, the musicians released their second EP Brave Enough to Fail via Day by Day Records and Anchors Aweigh Records. In April and May 2009, More Than Life toured continentally for the first time, opening for Your Demise and Deez Nuts.

Their debut album, Love Let Me Go, was released on CD and vinyl in 2010 via Purgatory Records. A European tour with Break Even was postponed from October 2011 to April 2012 as both groups struggled with line-up changes. They announced they Mor would disband after this tour. However, on 11 October 2012, they released a statement calling the disbandment claims "dumb shit we said in past statuses", and discussed their intentions to continue touring and writing music.

On 21 January 2013, they announced they would be entering the studio to record their second album. From November 21, 2013, to October 5, 2013, More Than Life toured Europe as a headliner. Performances took place in Germany, Italy, the Netherlands, Austria and in Czech Republic. The group was accompanied by Departures and Swan Dive. On September 21, 2013, the first date in Cologne, Being as an Ocean, Capsize and the Elijah also performed. In January 2014, the group played a concert tour of the United Kingdom, together with Landscapes, Goodtime Boys and Caspian. On April 14, 2014, the second album What's Left Of Me was released via Holy Roar Records. That month, they supported Architects on their tour of mainland Europe. Between 24 October and 9 November 2014, they headlined a tour of Australia and south-east Asia. On the Australian leg, they were supported by Perspectives.

== Musical style and legacy ==
Critic have categorised their music as melodic hardcore, emotional hardcore, progressive hardcore and post-rock. What’s Left Of Me (2014) saw the band shift to a sound more like the bands involved in the wave, using mostly clean guitar tones and incorporating spoken word, progressive music elements.

They cited influences including Go It Alone, Ruiner, Another Breath, Turning Point, Stay Gold, AFI, Farside, Hole, Tegan and Sara and Placebo.

More Than Life were of the most prominent bands in hardcore punk in the United Kingdom and international melodic hardcore of their time, helping to establish what Noizze called "a golden period of melodic hardcore". The band were widely influential, with a 2014 OX magazine article calling them "one of the most influential European hardcore bands of the last decade". They laid the foundational for what would become dreamcore music, and have been cited as an influence by Capsize.

== Discography ==
Album

- Love Let Me Go (2010)
- What’s Left Of Me (2014)

EPs

- Prelude (2007)
- Brave Enough to Fail (2008)

== Members ==
- James Matthews – vocals
- Joel Peets – guitar
- Joey Bayes – guitar
- Bobby Daniels – bass
- Tony Klein – drums
