= Broccoli (band) =

Scottish punk rock band

- Also known as: Pondlife (1989–1991)
- Origin: Dundee, Scotland
- Genres: Emo; emo pop; fraggle
- Years active: 1989, 1991–1998, 2002, 2016
- Spinoff of: Oi Polloi
- Past members: Paul Ross; Graeme Gilmour; Grant Myles; Benni Esposito; Scott Stewart

Broccoli were a Scottish punk rock band from Dundee. They released two studio albums and two Peel sessions for BBC Radio 1, creating music that merged elements of emo with elements of indie rock and pop music.

Formed in 1989, under the name Pondlife, the band's original run was less than a year. Reformed in early 1991, the band's first consistent lineup was Graeme Gilmour (drums), Paul Ross (bass) and Grant Myles (vocals, guitar). When Ross departed in 1993, his role was filled by Benni Esposito. The band spent much of the following years touring mainland Europe and Japan. They grew a fanatic following in Japan, a phenomenon which NME labelled "Broccolimania". They relocated to London in 1997. Following a 1998 mainland Europe tour, the band disbanded. They briefly reformed in 2002, performing at a fundraiser for Martin House Hospice, held at Josephs Well in Leeds, then again in 2016 for a tour of Japan.

== History ==
The band was formed in 1989 in Dundee, by drummer Graeme Gilmour, formerly of Oi Polloi, as well as bassist Paul Ross and guitarist Grant Myles. At this time they were using the name Pondlife. This iteration of the band disbanded soon after, when Ross and Miles began to play in Brain Damage.

Brain Damage disbanded in early 1991, and Gilmour, Ross and Myles regrouped. None of the trio wished to sing, leading Gilmour to enlist former Strictly Prohibited vocalist Neil. However, the band believed Neil's Britpop singing style was incongruous with the American-influenced instrumental style. After their first live performance, Gilmour, Ross and Myles pretended to disband the band, but instead regrouped without Neil. With this, Myles took on vocal duties, with his first written songs being "Jamaica Street" and "Blue". Soon, Ross began to write and sing too, during which time they record a demo and changed their name to Broccoli. In the following months, they began to perform live, opening for Rancid, Jacob's Mouse, Pitchshifter and Lunachicks. The band soon records a second demo, shortly followed by the departure of Ross in 1993, going on to play in hardcore bands Bloodshot and Engage. His role was filled by Benni Esposito. This was followed by their first performances outside of Scotland, with a series of shows performing alongside Leatherface, Snuff, Chopper, Crocodile God and Hooton 3 Car.

Their debut release was a split EP with Spare Snare side-project Muppet Mule, released through Chute Records in 1994. In October 1994, they opened for Jawbreaker in Glasgow. In 1995, they released the triple single "Broken / 10 Journey Trousers / Fido", which was one the earliest releases by Sunderland label Rumblestrip Records. 500 copies were pressed, with it being sold out within a few weeks, due to heavy press coverage. It was followed shortly by "All Smiles / Pondlife", then "Relent / 100 Days and Counting", as well as they toured the UK supporting J Church. On 28 May, BBC Radio 1 released a Peel session by the band. At this time, they were also receiving airplay on the station by Steve Lamacq, and were being courted by major labels. Instead, they signed to independent label Rugger Bugger Discs. In November 1995, the band recorded their debut self-titled album.

The band embarked on a 1996 Europe tour alongside Jessie and Wat Tyler, followed by a tour with Cable, the Mr. T Experience and No Fun at All. At the end of the year, they headlined a ten date tour of Japan. The tour received a fanatic response which NME labelled "Broccolimania". During this time, they released the Japan exclusive split EP with International Jet Set through Snuffy Smile Records. Following the tour, the band headlined Friendly Fire Christmas with support from Fusion.

In 1997, Myles relocated to London, and soon so did Gilmour. The band became based in Gipsy Hill, London, beginning to rehearse in a carpenter's workshop near Chestnut Road, here they wrote much of their second album. However, Esposito does not join them, departing from the group. His role was filled by Scott Stewart, formerly of Appleorchard. Stewart's first release with the band was the single "Da-a-a-nce" (1997), a cover of the song by the Lambrettas. Soon, the band embarked on a tour alongside Leatherface, Snuff, June of 44 and Hooton 3 Car, and released their second album, number the name Home (1988). They released the EP Crackle, embarked on a tour with Leatherface, Wat Tyler and the 'Tone, then tour Japan again, this time with Hootan 3 Car, soon putting out a split EP with Pinto, through Speedowax Records, and the Chestnut Road EP through Crackle Records. On 9 August, a second Peel session by the band was broadcast on BBC Radio 1, and began planning a U.S. tour with Braid.

=== Disbandment ===
During 1998, Broccoli toured Europe for 25 dates alongside Texas indie rock band Starfish, lasting a total of six weeks. Starfish included bassist Ronna Era and guitarist Jason Morales, who were married. During the tour, Era had an affair with Myles, the remaining members of each band discovered while in Spain. In response, Morales left the tour and his role in Starfish was filled for the remaining dates by Stewart. Myles did not return to the United Kingdom, soon marrying Era and moving to Olympia, Washington together, disbanding Broccoli.

Stewart and Gilmour formed Shonben in 1999, alongside Janet Morgan who would later form Channels. The band ran for only one year. Their sole album 1999 (recorded in 1999) was released retrospectively in 2003. In 2001, Stewart joined Dead Inside, following Larry Hibbitt's departure from the band to form Hundred Reasons.

On 26 January 2002, the band performed at a fundraiser for Martin House Hospice, held at Josephs Well in Leeds. The performed alongside Dugong, Fig.4.0, Eighty Six, the Mercy Suite, Skip Day Toner, Nathaniel Green, This Ain’t Vegas, Twofold and Everybody Is Going To Die. They then reformed in 2016 for an eight day tour of Japan.

== Musical style ==
Critics have categorised Broccoli's music as emo, emo pop and fraggle. Vice Media described their album Home (1998) as having a "Midwest emo vibe". They included elements of contemporary indie rock, abrasive post-hardcore instrumentals, vocal harmonies, poetic lyrics, aggressive guitars, and gruff vocals singing pop music-influenced melodies.

They cited influences including Dag Nasty, Squirrel Bait, Government Issue, Bauhaus, Mega City Four, Led Zeppelin, Sonic Youth, My Bloody Valentine, Scream, the Damned, Leatherface, the Replacements and Hüsker Dü.

== Members ==
- Graeme Gilmour – drums (1989, 1991–1998, 2002, 2016)
- Grant Myles – guitar (1989, 1991–1998, 2002, 2016)
- Paul Ross – bass (1989–1993)
- Benni Esposito – bass (1994–1997, died 2005)
- Scott Stewart – bass (1997–1998)

== Discography ==
Studio albums

- Broccoli (1996)
- Home (1998)

EPs

- Broccoli / Muppet Mule (1994, split EP with Muppet Mule)
- International Jet Set / Broccoli (1996, split EP with International Jet Set)
- Crackle (1998)
- Broccoli / Pinto (1998, split EP with Pinto)
- Chestnut Road (1998)
