= Hardcore punk in the United Kingdom =

Genre of music in the UK

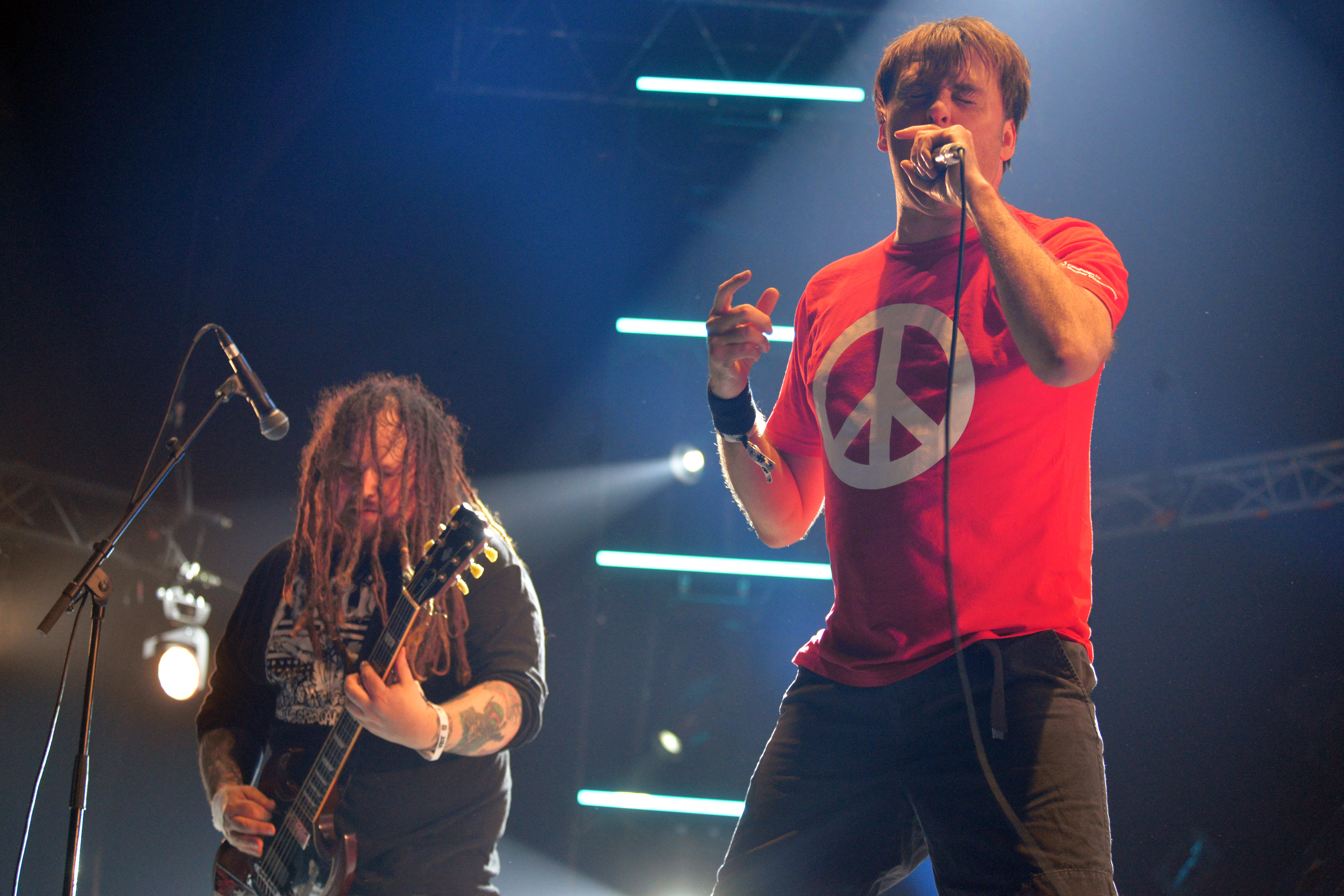
Birmingham's Napalm Death are one of the most successful bands to come for the UK's hardcore scene

Hardcore punk in the United Kingdom (often abbreviated as UKHC and during the 1980s called Britcore) began in the late 1970s and early 1980s with the second wave of punk rock in the country. The scene produced many successful and influential hardcore punk bands throughout the 1980s such as Discharge, GBH and the Exploited and led to the pioneering of genres such as grindcore, street punk, crust punk and D-beat.

In the 2000s, the genre saw a revived interest, leading to the success of hardcore groups including Gallows, Send More Paramedics and Dead Swans, metalcore groups like Bring Me the Horizon, Architects and Bullet for My Valentine and post-hardcore groups such as Fightstar, ¡Forward, Russia! and Funeral for a Friend. This interested carried on into the 2010s, when Malevolence, Frank Carter & the Rattlesnakes and Higher Power gained prominence.

== 1980s ==
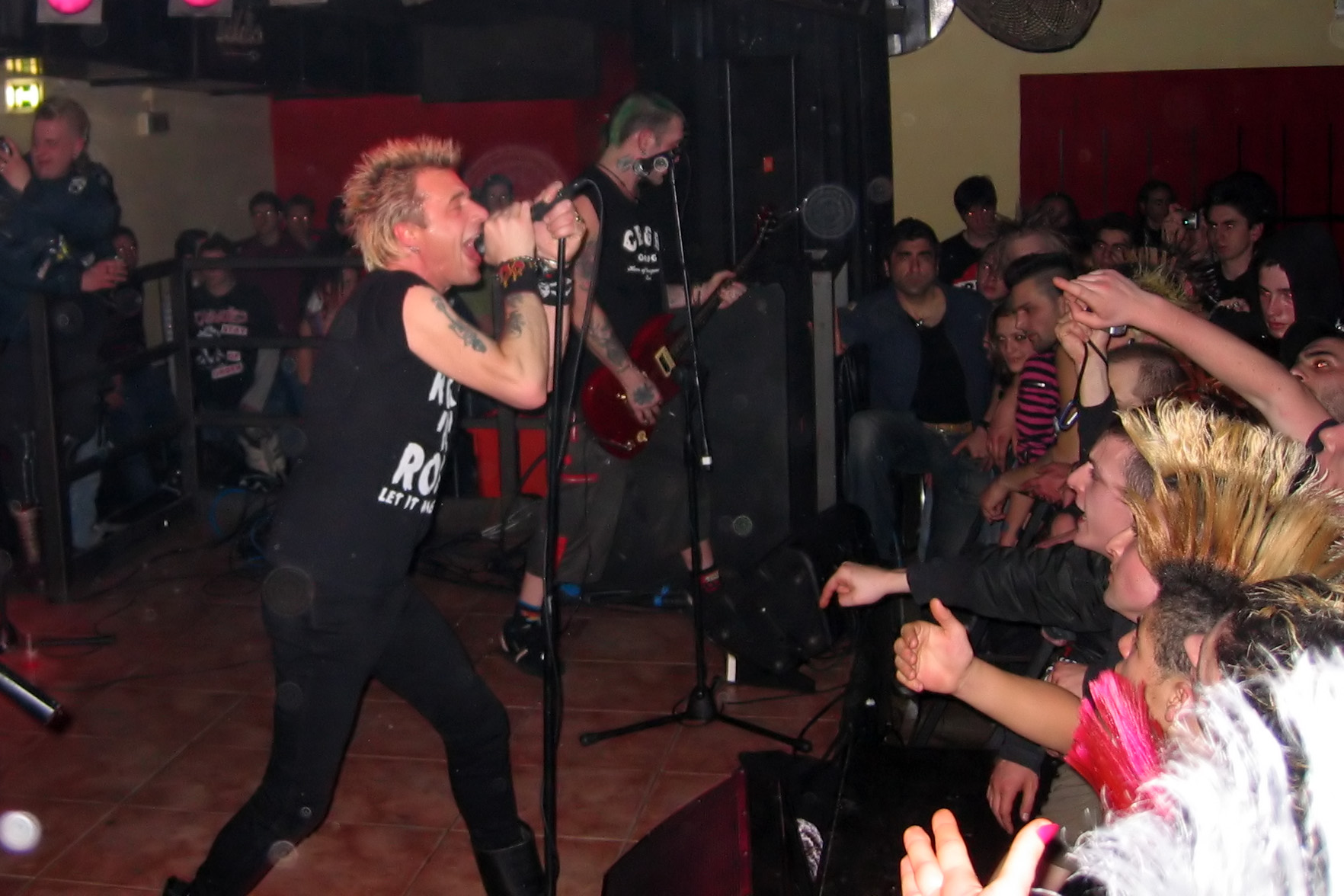
Birmingham's GBH were at the forefront of the first wave of UK hardcore

The first wave of UK hardcore punk is often referred to as "UK 82" or simply "second wave punk". The sound of the groups from this era is called street punk through its building upon the previous punk sound and added the heavy drumbeats and distorted guitar sound of new wave of British heavy metal bands and Motörhead. The term "UK 82" was taken from Edinburgh band the Exploited's song of the same name. They contrasted with early American hardcore bands by placing an emphasis on appearance. Frontman Walter "Wattie" Buchan had a giant red mohawk and the band continued to wear swastikas, an approach influenced by the wearing of this symbol by 1970s punks such as Sid Vicious. Because of this, the Exploited were labelled by others in the scene as "cartoon punks".

Formed in 1977 in Stoke-on-Trent, Discharge were of the most prominent bands in UK 82. AllMusic calls the band's sound a "high-speed noise overload" characterized by "ferocious noise blasts." The sound of their many imitators was dubbed as D-beat, referring to the band's distinctive drum beat. According to writer Ian Glasper, the Varukers from Leamington Spa, are often cited as the original D-beat band, due to their close sonic proximity to Discharge. Bands from this era, particularly Discharge and GBH were influential upon the development of multiple heavy metal styles, such as thrash metal and black metal, being cited as an influence by bands including Slayer, Anthrax, Sepultura and Metallica. Other prominent groups from this era include Broken Bones, Chaos UK, English Dogs.

In the second half of the 1980s, it became increasingly normalised for UK hardcore bands to be influenced by heavy metal styles. At this same time, a sect of bands began making music with more elements in common with US groups than their UK contemporaries. The most notable of these included Heresy, the Stupids and Filler.

=== Crust punk ===
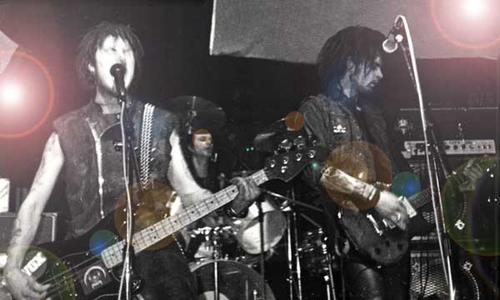
Daventry band Antisect are one of the progenitors of crust punk

Crust punk is a form of music influenced by punk rock and extreme metal. Founded by the English bands Amebix and Antisect, taking its name from Newcastle band Hellbastard's 1986 Ripper Crust demo. Deviated Instinct, Concrete Sox and Electro Hippies were also important crust punk bands from the time. Crust punk bands were a part of the hardcore scene of the time, despite not taking influence from the genre themselves. From this, crustcore developed when some crust punk bands began taking influence from hardcore and sometimes thrashcore. Felix Havok described Extreme Noise Terror's segment of the "Earslaughter" split album with Chaos UK as the first album in the genre, with Doom also being prominent in the style.

Crust punk influenced further developments into UK hardcore, specifically in its contribution to the creation of grindcore. It also made a significant impact on metal, with the high influential black metal band Bathory citing a number of crust bands as influences. Additionally, metal bands Sacrilege and Bolt Thrower began their careers involved in the West Midlands crust punk scene.

=== Grindcore ===
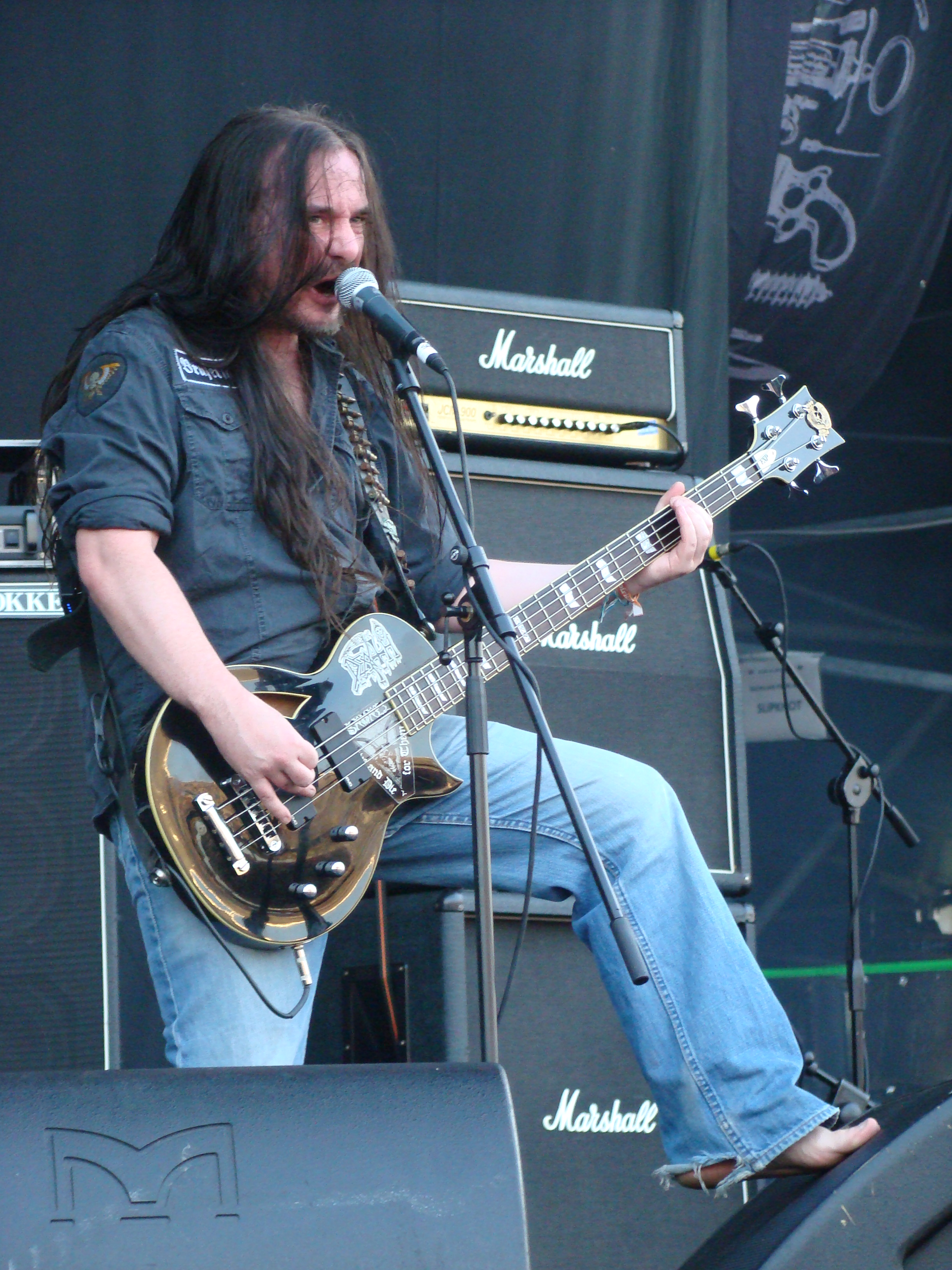
Liverpool's Carcass helped to pioneer grindcore in the mid-1980s

Grindcore, developed during the mid-1980s in the United Kingdom by Napalm Death, a group who emerged from the anarcho-punk scene in Birmingham, England. Whilst their first recordings were in the vein of Crass, they eventually became associated with crust punk, The group began to take on increasing elements of thrashcore, post-punk, and power electronics, and began describing their sound as "Siege with Celtic Frost riffs". The group also went through many changes in personnel. A major shift in style took place after Mick Harris became the group's drummer. Punk historian Ian Glasper indicates that "For several months gob-smacked audiences weren't sure whether Napalm Death were actually a serious band any longer, such was the undeniable novelty of their hyper-speed new drummer."

Earache Records was founded in 1985 by Digby Pearson, and would go on to help the further development of grindcore, hardcore and crust punk, by putting out releases from artists like Concrete Sox and Heresy. The label's first major release of note was MOSH 3, Napalm Death's Scum, which went on to reach number 7 in the UK indie chart.

Napalm Death's seismic impact inspired other British grindcore groups in the 1980s, among them Carcass and Sore Throat. Extreme Noise Terror, from Ipswich, formed in 1984. With the goal of becoming "the most extreme hardcore punk band of all time," the group took Mick Harris from Napalm Death in 1987. Ian Glasper describes the group as "pissed-off hateful noise with its roots somewhere between early Discharge and Disorder, with [vocalists] Dean [Jones] and Phil [Vane] pushing their trademark vocal extremity to its absolute limit." In 1991, the group collaborated with the acid house group The KLF, appearing onstage with the group at the Brit Awards in 1992. Carcass released Reek of Putrefaction in 1988, which John Peel declared his favorite album of the year despite its very poor production. The band's focus on gore and anatomical decay, lyrically and in sleeve artwork, inspired the goregrind subgenre. Sore Throat, said by Ian Glasper to have taken "perhaps the most uncompromisingly anti-music stance" were inspired by crust punk as well as industrial music. Some listeners, such as Digby Pearson, considered them to be simply an in-joke or parody of grindcore.

=== Straight edge ===
According to NoEcho writer Ethan Stewart "the closest thing to a straight edge band for much of the [1980s] was Statement", a solo project by the Apostles drummer Patrick "Rat" Poole. However, despite Poole being drug-free, vegan and having a massive influence on the development of hardline, he didn't identify with the straight edge label at the time. Additionally, many groups from the UK punk and hardcore scene did include straight edge members, namely Napalm Death, Blitz and Heresy.

The first entirely straight edge band in the country was Steadfast, who formed in Durham, England, in 1988. Despite originally being formed as a vehicle to annoy the members of the anarcho punk scene, the band eventually grew into a serious band. Following this, a number of additional straight edge bands began to form including XdisciplineX, False Face, Headstong, Step One and Kickback. Nicolas Royles, drummer for Sore Throat, formed In Touch and Withstand around this time, which both morphed into No Way Out by 1990. This scene was based mostly based in North East of England and Yorkshire, and made up of musicians who became involved in the hardcore scene through skateboarding and the popularity of thrash metal. The bands were predominantly influenced by US youth crew acts like Youth of Today and Gorilla Biscuits. Members of the existing punk and hardcore scenes in the country often reacted negatively to the straight edge bands, to the extent that on multiple occasions fights broke out between the musicians and fans.

== 1990s ==
Voorhees were a prominent hardcore band in 1990s hardcore. Formed in 1991 by members of UK straight edge bands Steadfast and False Face, they released three full-length albums, recorded a Peel session for BBC Radio 1 DJ John Peel and would go on to be cited as an influence by bands and musicians such as Kill Your Idols and Chubby Charles.

The largest sect of UK hardcore in the 1990s was emotional hardcore. According to a 1994 article by Vice, "the main group" in the scene was Fabric. Formed in London in 1992 by former members of Long Cold Stare and Ordinary Eye, the band released two albums before their breakup. Other groups from this period included Understand, Dead Wrong and Bob Tilton.

A second wave of UK straight edge began in the mid-1990s. Mostly based around Subjugation and Sure Hand Records, this wave saw members of many of the first wave bands form new bands and begin to embrace influences from heavy metal. The main location for this scene was the 1 in 12 Club, an anarchist club in Bradford, West Yorkshire, as groups like Unborn, Slavearc, Vengeance of Gaia and Withdrawn performed there frequently.

In 1996, a hardcore scene in London began around the informal collective "London Black-Up", which include bands like Knuckledust, Ninebar and Bun Dem Out. Bands in this scene often incorporated elements of grime, hip hip and metal into their sounds and was based around venues such as the Camden Underworld, New Cross Inn and the Dome in Tufnell Park.

== 2000s ==
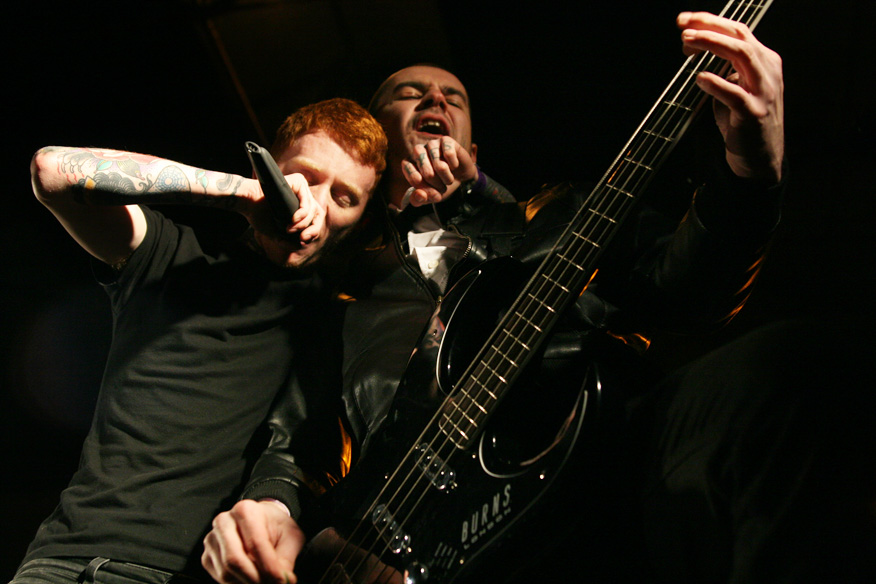
Gallows, from Watford, were the first UK hardcore band to sign to a major label

The 2000s saw the rise in prominent of a number of UK post-hardcore bands, the most prominent of which was Bridgend's Funeral for a Friend, whose 2003 debut album Casually Dressed & Deep in Conversation peaked at number 12 on the UK singles chart. London's Fightstar released their debut studio album, Grand Unification, in 2006, which Kerrang! editor Paul Brannigan called "one of the best British rock albums of the last decade". They then received a nomination for Best British Band at the 2006 Kerrang! Awards Leeds band ¡Forward, Russia!'s, merger of post-hardcore and dance-punk led to them gaining significant attention as a part of the New Yorkshire movement in indie rock. And None of Them Knew They Were Robots were also influential within the Leeds post-hardcore scene, in addition to spawning crossover thrash band Send More Paramedics in 2001, who won Zane Lowe's the 'fresh meat' competition on BBC Radio 1 show, leading to a "Guerilla Gig Live" performance on BBC Three. Other notable bands from this era include Jarcrew, Hell Is for Heroes, Yourcodenameis:milo, Hundred Reasons and Million Dead.

Watford hardcore band Gallows released their debut album Orchestra of Wolves on 25 September 2006 through In at the Deep End Records in the UK and Epitaph Records in the US The album peaked at number 57 on the UK charts. In March 2007, Gallows signed a deal with Warner Bros Records, making them the first British hardcore punk band to sign to a major label. On 2 May 2009, Gallows released their sophomore album Grey Britain, which was a concept album based on Britain after the 2008 financial crisis, which was "centered on a world of emboldened racism, xenophobia, knife crime and inescapable mental illness". It peaked at number 20 on the UK charts. The album led to Warner Bros dropping the group due to them believing it to be too confrontational politically. The album debuted at number 20 in the UK album chart, leading to Ben Myers of Mojo commented "Not since the Pistols and the Specials has a pissed off provincial band so clearly meant it" Kerrang! listed Grey Britain as the best album of 2009. NME listed the album among the 15 greatest hardcore punk albums of all time. The success of Gallows led to other British hardcore acts of the time gain notability like the Ghost of a Thousand.

=== Metalcore ===
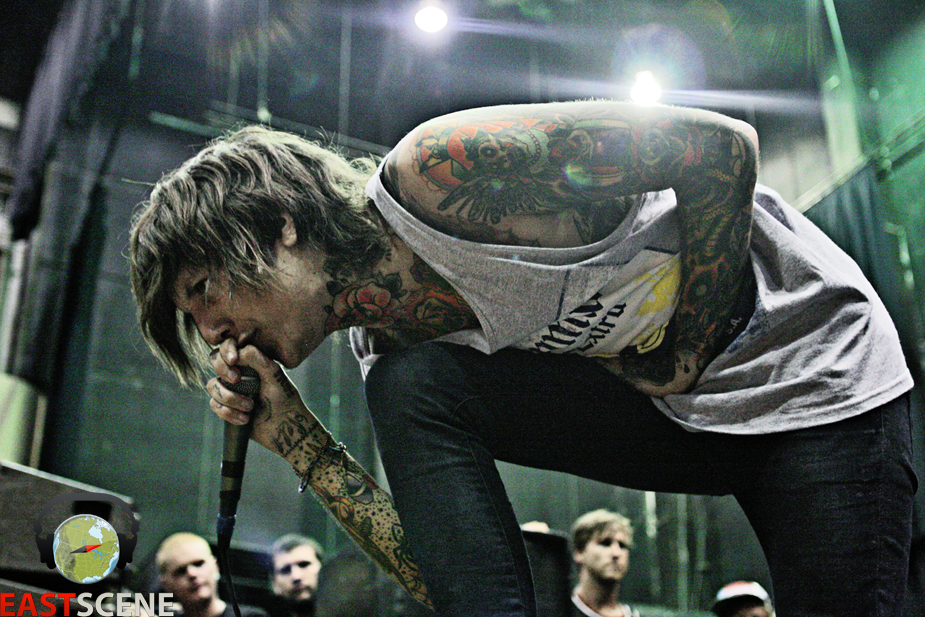
Sheffield's Bring Me the Horizon were one of the most prominent bands in UK metalcore in the 2000s

Bridgend, Wales band Bullet for My Valentine's debut album The Poison was released in October 2005 in Europe and was released in February 2006 in the United States. On July 26, 2006, Blabbermouth.net reported that The Poison has sold 72,000 copies in the United States. On October 27, 2007, Blabbermouth.net reported that The Poison has sold 336,000 copies in the United States. On April 3, 2010, Billboard reported that The Poison sold 573,000 copies in the United States. The Poison was certified gold by the RIAA on January 30, 2009. Bullet for My Valentine's second album Scream Aim Fire, released in 2008, peaked at number 4 on the Billboard 200 and sold 360,000 copies in the United States. Bullet for My Valentine's 2010 album Fever peaked at number 3 on the Billboard 200, selling 71,000 copies in the United States during its first week of release. Fever's song "Your Betrayal" peaked at number 25 on the Bubbling Under Hot 100 chart.

The late-2000s metalcore scene was fronted by Architects and Bring Me the Horizon. In 2008, Brighton band Architects became the second British band to sign to the label Century Media Records. Their debut on the label, 2009's Hollow Crown, peaked at 117 on the UK Albums Chart, their subsequent albums gradually raising in chart prominence, with their 2016 album All Our Gods Have Abandoned Us eventually peaking at 15. Sheffield's Bring Me the Horizon began their career playing deathcore, before transitioning into metalcore with their second album Suicide Season. In 2013, they signed to the major label RCA Records, who released their fourth album Sempiternal, which peaked at number 3 on the UK albums chart. The band's massive mainstream success led publications such as the Guardian and the Independent to accredit them as "the new Metallica".

Asking Alexandria from York were the most successful bands to originate from the MySpace metalcore scene. They released their debut album Stand Up and Scream in 2009, reaching number 29 on the US independent albums chart. According to RockSound, the album made the band "global stars of the scene" and its influence "redefined and reinvigorated [the] genre nearly singlehandedly". Its lead single "the Final Episode" was certified gold in the US in the following years.

== 2010s ==
In the late 2000s and early 2010s a large melodic hardcore scene emerged, including Dead Swans, While She Sleeps, More Than Life, Heights, Landscapes and Departures. Noizze called this the "golden period of melodic hardcore". While She Sleeps from Sheffield were one of the most successful bands to come from this scene, playing sold-out shows across the country at venues like Brixton Academy. Their 2017 third album You Are We peaked at number 8 on the UK albums charts.

Gallows vocalist Frank Carter returned to the hardcore scene with the formation of his band Frank Carter & The Rattlesnakes. The band's 2015 debut album "Blossom" peaked at number 18 on the UK albums chart, with its follow ups "Modern Ruin" and "End of Suffering reaching 7 and 4, respectively. Bury Tomorrow from Southampton debuted around the same time, their 2018 album Black Flame peaked at number 21 on the UK albums charts, and its follow up Cannibal peaked at number 10.

=== UKswell ===
UKswell was a movement in UK hardcore that saw bands embraced the influence of the wave in the United States, as well as Young Widows, November Coming Fire and Converge. Centred on Holy Roar Records, stylistically, it encompasses an "overwrought" style of emo that subverted the conventions of the genre. It opposed the growing influence of metal upon hardcore, and was characterised by angry, depressive and sentimental post-hardcore, melodic hardcore and energetic and sincere screamo.

It began around 2009, when Pariso, Goodtime Boys, Kerouac, the Long Haul and Bastions began performing together, whom subverted the horror imagery and toxic masculinity of hardcore of the time, seeking radical inclusion. As a concept, it was devised in 2010 by the members of Bastions and Pariso. Its name was coined as a joke by Pariso guitarist Stuart Anderson in reference to "the wave". By 2011, its core was Goodtime Boys, Kerouac, the Long Haul, Pariso and Bastions, with other bands in the movement including Ohhms, Old Skin, Stallone, Human Future, Artemis, Grappler, Witch Cult, Brontide, Jackals, Hush, run,WALK, Crocus and Plaids. Its initial wave ended in 2012, with the 10 July disbandment of Kerouac. Though a second wave quickly formed with We Never Learned to Live, Employed to Serve, Ithaca, Vales and Svalbard.

=== New Wave of British Hardcore ===
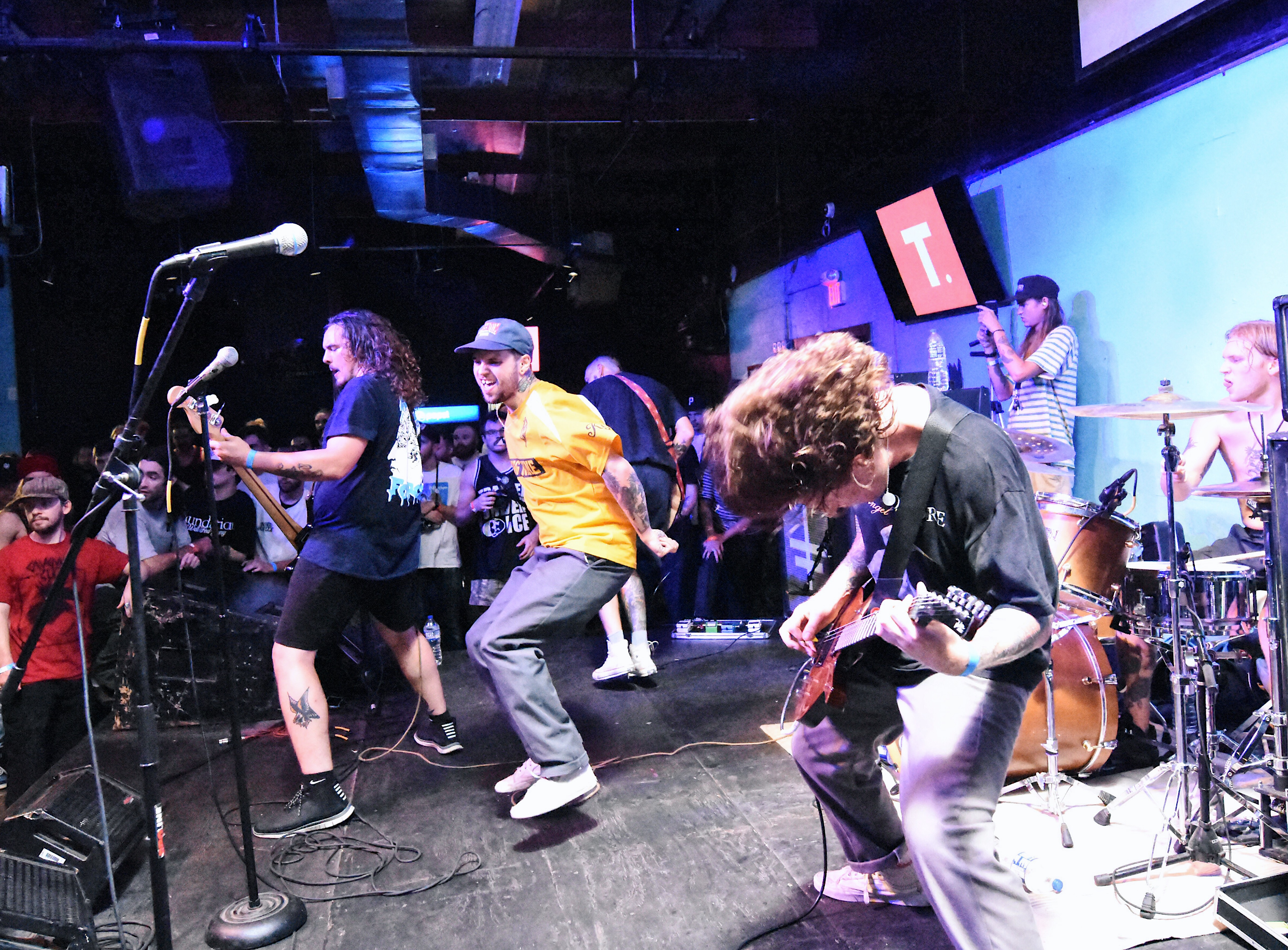
Higher Power from Leeds were described by Metal Hammer as "the band redefining hardcore for a new generation"

In the early to mid–2010s, a number of British hardcore punk bands began being represented as members of a new musical movement dubbed the New Wave of British Hardcore (NWOBHC), a term coined by Adam Malik from The Essence Records. The movement was fronted by Liverpool-formed, Leeds-based band Violent Reaction, with other notable practitioners including Arms Race, Big Cheese, Higher Power and the Flex. Primarily based around Leeds, Liverpool, Manchester, London and Brighton, the movement saw bands merge elements of UK82 and oi! into an American-inspired style of hardcore.

Writer Tony Rettman the record label Quality Control HQ as "the center of [the NWOBHC]", stating that it "helped [to] define the modern sound of UK hardcore". The label was founded by British–Polish musician Ola Herbich, a member of the bands Arms Race and Game, after she visited the New York hardcore scene in 2009. Outbreak Festival, which for much of its existence has been held at Canal Mills in Armley, Leeds, is a key location for the hardcore scene, and most features local groups like Higher Power, as well as international groups like Code Orange, Turnstile and Vein.

Former Violent Reaction and Shrapnel member Jimmy Wizard formed Higher Power in 2014, with his brother Alex, which eventually grew to include additional members Louis Hardy, Max Harper and Ethan Wilkinson. Metal Hammer hailed the band as "the band redefining hardcore for a new generation", and are the second UK hardcore band to have signed to a major label, in the form of Roadrunner Records.

The straight edge ideology was particularly prominent within during this period, which culminated in the mid-to late 2010s youth crew revival, fronted by Rapture, Shrapnel and Insist. By 2016, Vice had described Leeds bands Rapture, Shrapnel, True Vision and Regiment as "the Second Coming of UK Straight Edge Hardcore".

In London there was a parallel scene existing concurrently, though with some crossover, that had overt feminist and queercore leanings. This consisted of bands like Good Throb, Frau, Petrol Girls, Nekra, and Woolf, and was mainly focused around the venues Power Lunches and DIY Space For London.

== 2020s ==
In the early 2020s, Chubby and the Gang from west London gained mainstream attention, the band was formed out of multiple NWOBHC bands, namely Arms Race, Gutter Knife and Vile Spirit. Additionally, Static Dress from Leeds emerged as one of the frontrunners of the scene metalcore revival.

== Birmingham ==
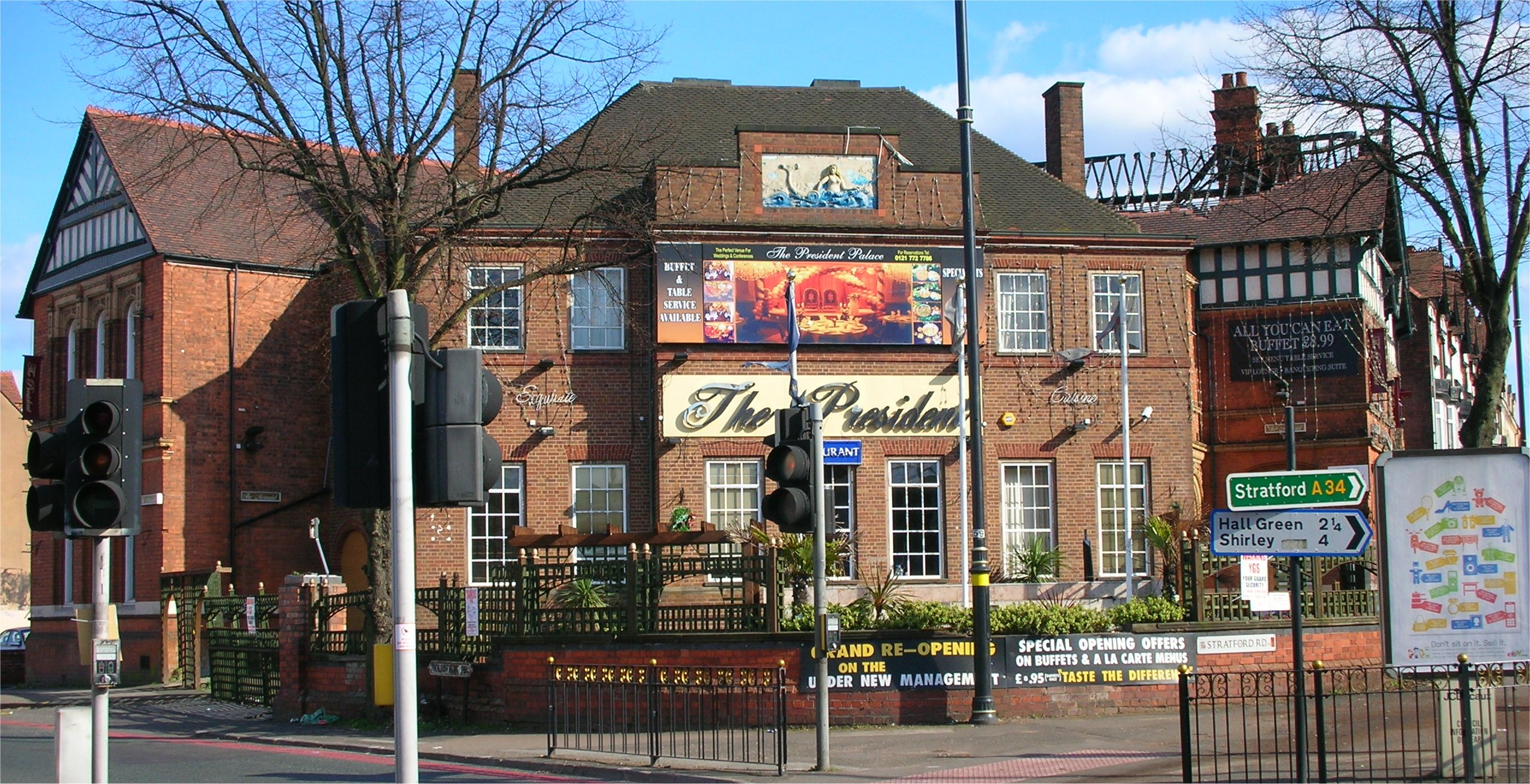
The Mermaid pub in Birmingham frequently held performance by groups such as Napalm Death and GBH

Birmingham's GBH were one of the three dominant bands of the second wave of British punk, reacting against the perceived commercialisation of earlier punk to produce music that was "brutal, fast and very aggressive". They were one of the defining groups of their era and would go on to influence various musical styles, particularly the development of thrash metal.

The Mermaid in Birmingham's Sparkhill district was a run-down inner-city pub. Promoter Daz Russell started booking hardcore bands at the venue in late 1984. this led to it becoming one of the key locations for the scene in this era. Justin Broadrick later remembered: "it was really just a shitty pub in a really shitty area, which just meant that you could get away with a lot more."

Napalm Death, were also based in the city. They are a pioneer of the grindcore genre and one of the most influential and commercially successful bands in extreme metal and hardcore. Formed in nearby Meriden in 1979 by Nik Bullen and Miles "Rat" Ratledge, they were influenced initially by hardcore punk bands such as Crass, Discharge and GBH. First adopting their name and a settled lineup in late 1981, they produced and traded cassette tapes internationally, and first performed in public in April 1981. Bullen met Justin Broadrick in Birmingham's Rag Market in 1983 and the two started making electronic and industrial music while Napalm Death temporarily ground to a halt. The band resumed activities in 1985 with Broadrick on guitar, increasingly coming under the influence of extreme metal acts such as Celtic Frost, and performing at the Mermaid for the first time in October 1985. Napalm Death soon became almost the house band at the Mermaid, with their growing local following ensuring good crowds for visiting bands.

The city was home to other notable groups like Doom, Anaal Nathrakh and Oceans Ate Alaska.

== South East England ==
Southampton and Brighton in South East England have cultivated some of the most prominent bands in hardcore, punk and metalcore. In Brighton: Poison Girls were one of the most prominent and influential groups in the late-1970s and early-1980s anarcho-punk scene. Dead Swans played a large part in the 2000s hardcore scene, with NME listing their album Sleepwalkers as one of "the best hardcore albums of all time". Architects were a frontrunner of the late-2000s British metalcore scene.

In Southampton: Bury Tomorrow have gained significant attention since debuting in the late-2000s. Metal Hammer described them as "a formidable force in the metalcore realm today". Our Time Down Here began as a fast hardcore band, however on their 2012 second album, they pursued a more melodic, horror punk-influenced style. This would go on to influence a wave of Southampton horror punk groups, that included Creeper and Miss Vincent.

== South Wales ==
=== 1990s ===
In the late 1990s, a scene of Welsh bands emerged, including Fishtake, No Fit State, Public Disturbance and No Choice, who had were taking influences from United States hardcore. One particularly popular sound upon this group was the "gruff punk" sound, informed by Jawbreaker and British band Leatherface. By the 2000s, Fishtake had become the Take, and No Fit State had become Douglas. This scene was largely based around the Toll House in Bridgend, the Maltsters in Pontypridd, TJ's in Newport and the Barfly in Cardiff. A central element of this scene was the record label Mighty Atom Records, who also owned a record studio.

=== 2000s ===
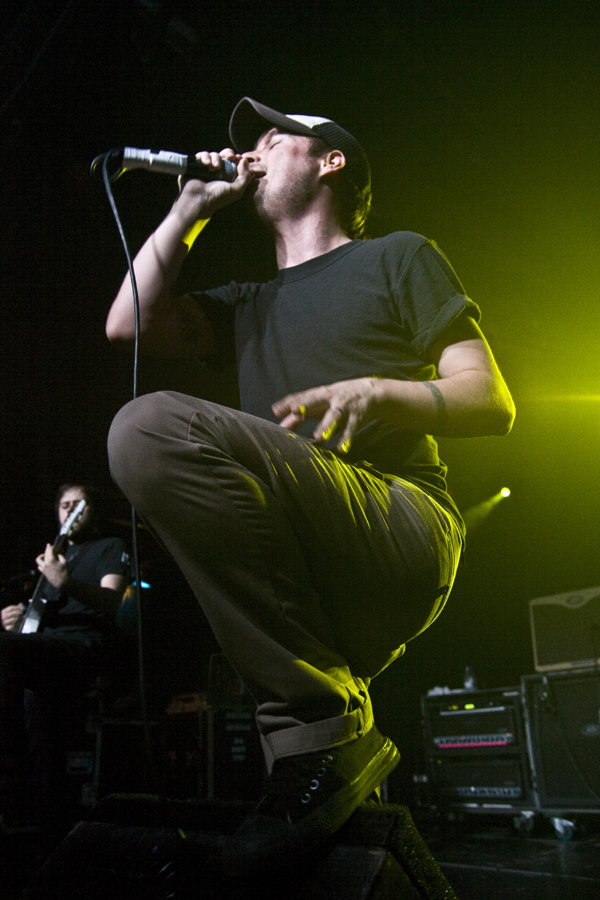
Funeral for a Friend are an influential post-hardcore band from Bridgend

Lostprophets began as a spinoff of Pontypridd metalcore band Public Disturbance. Their debut album The Fake Sound of Progress (2000) released by independent label Visible Noise. The album didn't initially receive much attention, but entered the Billboard 200 chart following the release of the first single from the album, "Shinobi vs. Dragon Ninja", selling more than 120 thousand copies in the United States and 250 thousand copies in the United Kingdom. This success led them to sign to major label Columbia Records, who re-released the album in 2001 On Friday 1 March 2002 the album was certified Silver by the British Phonographic Industry (BPI) and on Friday 26 April 2002 was certified Gold by the British Phonographic Industry. In the following years, Adequate Seven and the Take signed to Household Records, an independent label central to UK hardcore at the time.

TJ's organised an under-18s night called Teen Spirit, which would host performances by bands including Douglas, Shootin' Goon and Adequate Seven. This is where many of the members of the South Wales' 2000s post-hardcore scene would first meet. Lostprophet's success also led to major record labels attempting to sign many these bands. The first of these was Funeral for a Friend, who formed in 2001 following the departure of vocalist Michael Davies from Bridgend metalcore band January Thirst. At Bridgend record store The Jungle, the members of January Thirst met worker Matthew Davies-Kreye, who soon joined the band as vocalist, renaming themselves Funeral for a Friend. Davies-Kreye's influence from emo brought the band more melodic sensibilities. A 2008 BBC article called them "the archetypal UK version of emo".

Emo expanded in the area, with the subsequent success of the Blackout, Adzuki, Covergirl, Night And The City Of Broken Promises, Shape Of My Addiction and Robots Talk In Twos. In the wake of this success, a number of popular publications also began running stories stating that "Newport is the new Seattle" or "South Wales is the new Seattle". The sound of these bands was generally shaped by albums from American groups such as Full Collapse (2001) by Thursday, Tear from the Red (2002) by Poison the Well and Worship and Tribute (2002) by Glassjaw. In a 2015 article by Vice, Funeral for a Friend vocalist Matthew Davies-Kreye stated that "We took [the sound of the aforementioned American artists] and spun it on it’s [sic] head, gave it a bit more of a geographical sensibility. You write what you know, so the lyrical content distilled all the elements of the world around us", going on to cite the Manic Street Preachers, especially their third album the Holy Bible (1994), as "very influential on absolutely everyone". The most successful groups to come from the scene were Funeral for a Friend, Kids in Glass Houses and Lostprophets. Metalcore band Bullet for My Valentine were also from Bridgend, Metal Hammer described them as "the biggest British metal band of the 21st century".

In a 2010 article, BBC writer James McLaren described groups like Brutality Will Prevail, Goodtime Boys, 33 and Ironclad as "the shape of (Welsh) punk to come".

=== 2010s ===
Wales was one of the most prominent locations in the 2010s dreamcore movement. At this time, the YouTube channel Dreambound was one of the most prominent sources for finding bands, uploading music videos for many prominent bands, with this era of the genre being posthumously named "dreamcore". Groups in this scene, often embraced elements of post-rock, and used cleaner and more commercially accessible production styles than had previously been uncommon in the genre. The most prominent act in Welsh dreamcore was Casey, formed by former members of Continents. In the later years of this scene, bands began decreasing the influence they took from hardcore, when Holding Absence were instead leaning further into post-rock and shoegaze By the time of Casey's 2023 reunion shows, they had entered a level of cult status which Noizze writer Ethan Young stated made them "one of the most notable melodic hardcore groups of the decade".

== Yorkshire ==
Sore Throat, based in Huddersfield, were emblematic of the late-1980s grindcore scene through their merger pop culture satire, extreme political views and short, improvised songwriting. The band's drummer, Paul "Hammy" Halmshaw, founded Peaceville Records in 1983, which began releasing material by crust, hardcore and anarcho bands, before soon beginning to put out metal releases. In the 1990s, it released material for the pioneering gothic metal and death doom bands Paradise Lost, My Dying Bride and Anathema. Anti System from Bradford were also a notable band roughly contemporary to Sore Throat.

The 1 in 12 Club, an anarchist co-op venue in Bradford, was the main location of the mid-1990s straight edge hardcore scene, played by groups like Unborn, Slavearc, Vengeance of Gaia and Withdrawn. It also frequently hosted 80s crust and anarcho punk bands.

North Yorkshire, particularly Harrogate, has also produced a number of hardcore bands, most notably Blood Youth. Additionally, Bingley produced the successful band Marmozets, who began their career playing mathcore.

=== Leeds ===
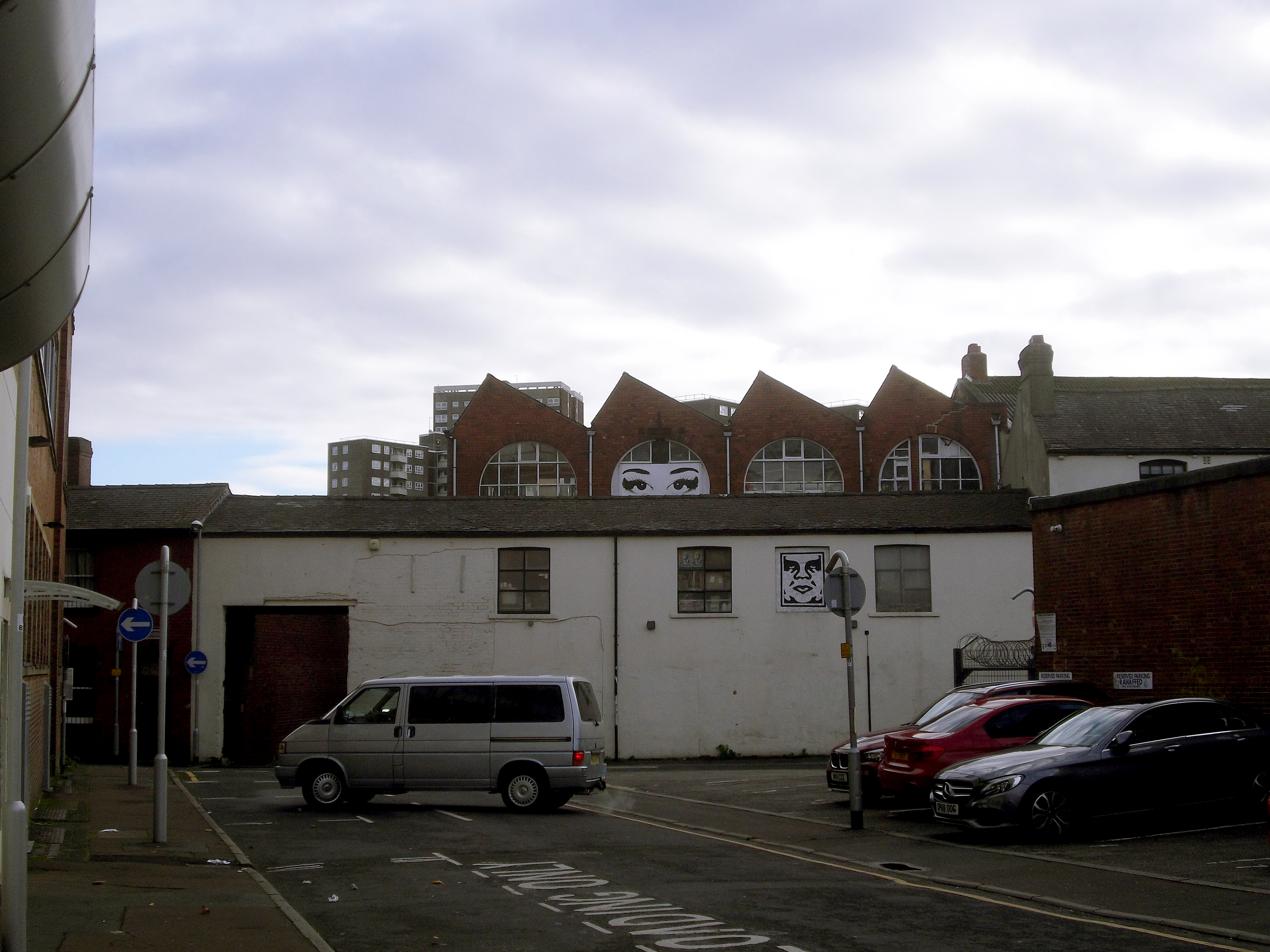
The original location of Boom, a popular venue amongst Leeds' current hardcore punk scene

In the late-1970s, Leeds was home to influential punk rock groups such as the Mekons, Gang of Four and Delta 5, who helped to shape the sound of post-punk. As the aforementioned groups pushed punk rock into more experimental directions, the likes of Abrasive Wheels, the Underdogs, the Expelled and Icon A.D. pursued more aggressive and confrontational punk styles like anarcho punk, street punk and hardcore punk. Chumbawamba, who lived in a squat in Armley, emerged from this scene soon after and transformed it by bringing vegetarianism, animal rights and anti-violence values into the anarchist scene. Along with A State of Mind, Chumbawamba brought about the emergence of the term "peace punk".

Liverpool hardcore punk Violent Reaction's relocation to Leeds in the early-2010s, led to the city becoming one of the main locations for the then-emerging New Wave of British Hardcore (NWOBHC) scene. Merging elements of UK82 and oi! into the sound of hardcore, the NWOBHC continued to grow in the city, where groups like the Flex, Regiment, True Vision and Shrapnel became prominent practitioners. The Temple of Boom (now called simply Boom) on Millwright Street quickly became the most prominent venue within this scene. Opened in 2011 by Voorhees members Ian "Lecky" Leck and Sean Walker, the venue began as a rehearsal studio, before beginning to put on performances after being pushed to by the members of the Flex. Former Violent Reaction and Shrapnel member Jimmy Wizard formed Higher Power in 2014, with his brother Alex, which eventually grew to include additional members Louis Hardy, Max Harper and Ethan Wilkinson. Metal Hammer hailed the band as "the band redefining hardcore for a new generation", and are the second UK hardcore band to have signed to a major label, in the form of Roadrunner Records.

Bandcamp Daily writer Fred Mikardo-Greaves had stated that Leeds punk and hardcore bands are often more "fun" than other similar scenes, citing a "a sense of absurdity" in the sound of groups like Ona Snop and the Shits.

=== Sheffield ===
Since the mid-2000s Sheffield has produced a number of notable metalcore bands. Bring Me the Horizon is one of the most successful bands to come out of the international metalcore scene. Beginning as a deathcore band, became increasingly influenced by pop and electronic music through their career. While She Sleeps have also gained significant mainstream attention. Rolo Tomassi gained success with their progressive take on hardcore. Malevolence are also a notable Sheffield band, playing a sound that merges hardcore and metal, while cultivating chav aesthetics.

== See also ==
- Anarcho-punk
