= We Never Learned to Live =

- Also known as: If Heroes Should Fail (2012–2013)
- Origin: Brighton, East Sussex, U.K.
- Genres: Post-hardcore; post-rock; melodic hardcore; screamo (early)
- Years active: 2012–2022
- Labels: Holy Roar, Through Love, Hourglass
- Past members: Seán Mahon; Brett Houslop; Mark Portnoi; Gary Marsden; David Kane

We Never Learned to Live was an English post-hardcore band from Brighton. Formed in 2012 by Sean Mahon (vocals), Brett Houslop (guitar), Mark Portnoi (bass) and Gary Marsden (drums), the band originally named themselves If Heroes Should Fail. They released their debut EP First Light in 2013.

Following the recruitment of second guitar David Kane, they rebranded to We Never Learned to Live, releasing their self-titled EP that year, followed by a split EP with Human Future in 2014. They released their debut album Silently, I Threw Them Skyward in 2015. They entered a hiatus in 2016, which ended with the release campaign for The Sleepwalk Transmissions in 2019. Their early fusion of screamo, melodic hardcore and post-rock led them to be absorbed into the ongoing UKswell movement. As they progressed they abandonded much of their screamo elements, and increasingly incorporated clean singing and elements of progressive music.

== History ==
Sean Mahon (vocals), Brett Houslop (guitar), Mark Portnoi (bass) and Gary Marsden (drums) had played in a number of bands together in Brighton since at least 2009. In 2012, the four formed the band If Heroes Should Fail and released the EP First Light. Soon, they recruited David Kane as a second guitarist. After Kane's first live performance with the band, the members became disheartened by their band name. In 2013, they announced that they would change their name to We Never Learned to Live, citing their musical progression as making them "feel like a completely different band". Their new name was chosen with the intention of incorporating a storytelling element, inspired by I Built the Sky and Alexisonfire.

We Never Learned to Live released their self-titled EP in 2013. They began to support UKswell bands Bastions and the Goodtime Boys, who were signed to Holy Roar Records and soon were approached by the label to release an album. During May 2013, they toured Europe with Svalbard. On 24 June 2014, they released a split EP with Human Future. During 2014, they began using their line checks in order to write songs through jam sessions.

In 2015, Holy Roar released the band's debut album Silently, I Threw Them Skyward. That year, they recorded a Maida Vale session for BBC Radio 1 DJ Daniel P Carter, then performed at the 2015 ArcTanGent. On 2 April 2016, they performed at Strangeforms festival. On 21 May, they played Holy Roar Records' ten year anniversary party. On 22 June 2016, they released the single "Silently, I Threw Them Skyward". In between tours, the band attempted to rework leftover songs from their debut album into songs for a second album, but were unable to. This was halted when Mahon's wife began pregnancy, leading to a brief hiatus.

On 31 January 2019, they released the single "Luma/ Non Luma" through Through Love Records. On 5 April, they released the single "Retreat Syndrome" and announced the release of their second album The Sleepwalk Transmissions, set for 10 May. In May 2019, they headlined a tour of the UK. They performed their final live set at ArcTanGent Festival 2022 on 18 August 2022.

== Musical style and legacy ==
Critics have categorised We Never Learned to Live's music as post-hardcore, post-rock, melodic hardcore and screamo. They made use of elements of shoegaze, D-beat, progressive music and post-metal. Their music as If Heroes Should Fail contained influences from heavy metal music.

On their early material, they focused on a fusion of screamo and post-rock. With Silently, I Threw Them Skyward (2015), they began to focus more heavily on sung vocals, moving into a more progressive rock-informed take on post-rock. The band's later music was particularly based in the 2000s style of post-hardcore, making use of quiet-loud dynamics between verses and choruses. Their songs put an emphasis on the texture of guitar tones, particularly a shimmering clean tone and reverb-heavy atmosphere. They made use of sudden tempo changes, time signatures changes, unorthodox song structures and guitar pedals. Their music was dissonant and chaotic. Their song often slowly built ambient soundscapes with grandiose choruses, through long runtimes.

We Never Learned to Live's lyrics were emotional and poetic, focusing on science fiction themes. Silently, I Threw Them Skyward (2015) was a concept album set in a fictional universe. They cited narratives influences including Cosmos, Philip K. Dick, H. G. Wells, Terry Pratchett, Douglas Adams, Star Trek: The Next Generation, 2001: A Space Odyssey, Battlestar Galactica and the Truman Show. They cited musical influences including Alexisonfire, Reuben, Hundred Reasons, Thursday, I Built the Sky, post-rock and hardcore punk.

Noizze writer Dan Hallier called them "one of the best names in post-hardcore but one that will never be repeated again, a fact most heartbreaking" Dan Nightingale of Conjurer noted them as a band who broadened the UK hardcore scene's sonic landscape, influencing his band to "have free reign [sic]" over their sound. They were a later part of the UKswell movement, which was typified by angry, depressive and sentimental post-hardcore, actively subverting the horror imagery and toxic masculinity of hardcore of the time, instead seeking radical inclusion.

== Members ==
- Seán Mahon – vocals (2012–2022)
- Brett Houslop – guitar (2012–2022)
- Mark Portnoi – bass (2012–2022)
- Gary Marsden – drums (2012–2022)
- David Kane – guitar (2013–2022)

== Discography ==
Albums

- Silently, I Threw Them Skyward (2015)
- The Sleepwalk Transmissions (2019)

EPs

- First Light (2012; as If Heroes Should Fail)
- We Never Learned To Live (2013)
- We Never Learned To Live, Human Future (2014; split EP with Human Future)
