= List of emo pop bands =

Emo pop is a fusion genre of emo with pop-punk, pop music, or both. The genre developed during the 1990s with it gaining substantial commercial success in the 2000s. The following is a list of artists who play that style in alphabetical order.

== List of bands ==
=== A ===
- The Academy Is...
- Afterhour
- Alkaline Trio
- The All-American Rejects
- All Time Low
- Amber Pacific
- The Anniversary
- Attack! Attack!
- The Ataris
- Armor for Sleep
- The Audition
- Avril Lavigne

=== B ===
- Bayside
- Boston Manor
- Boys Like Girls
- Brandtson
- Brand New
- Broccoli

=== C ===
- The Cab
- Can't Swim
- Cartel
- Cinematic Sunrise
- Cute Is What We Aim For

=== D ===
- Dashboard Confessional
- Destroy Rebuild Until God Shows

=== E ===
- The Early November

=== F ===
- Fall Out Boy
- Fireworks
- Forever the Sickest Kids
- Further Seems Forever
- FVK

=== G ===
- Get Scared
- The Get Up Kids
- Good Charlotte

=== H ===
- Halifax
- Hawthorne Heights
- Hellogoodbye
- Hey Mercedes
- Hey Monday
- Hidden in Plain View
- The Higher
- Hot Rod Circuit

=== J ===
- Jack's Mannequin
- The Jealous Sound
- Jimmy Eat World
- Joyce Manor
- The Juliana Theory

=== K ===
- Knapsack

=== L ===
- Lostprophets

=== M ===
- Mae
- The Maine
- Matchbook Romance
- Mayday Parade
- Meg & Dia
- Metro Station
- Midtown
- Motion City Soundtrack
- Moose Blood
- My Chemical Romance

=== N ===
- Never Shout Never
- New Found Glory
- Northstar

=== P ===
- Panic! at the Disco
- Paramore
- Piebald
- Plain White T's
- The Promise Ring

=== R ===
- The Ready Set
- Real Friends
- The Red Jumpsuit Apparatus
- The Rocket Summer

=== S ===
- Saves the Day
- Say Anything
- Sleeping with Sirens
- Something Corporate
- Sorority Noise
- The Spill Canvas
- Spitalfield
- Stereo Skyline
- Straylight Run
- The Summer Set

=== T ===
- Taking Back Sunday
- Thursday
- Tokio Hotel

=== U ===
- The Used

=== W ===
- We the Kings
- Weezer
- The Wonder Years

=== Y ===
- Yellowcard
- You Me at Six
