= Caravels (band) =

American post-hardcore band

Caravels are an American post-hardcore band from Henderson, Nevada.

== History ==
Caravels began in 2010 with the release of an EP titled Floorboards. In 2011, Caravels released a self-titled 7" via Topshelf Records.

In 2012, Caravels released a 12" split with Gifts from Enola titled Well Worn via Topshelf Records and The Mylene Sheath.

On March 26, 2013, Caravels released their first full-length album titled Lacuna via Topshelf Records.

In January 2015, Caravels released a split with Octaves via Topshelf Records and Bridge Nine Records before going on hiatus.

== Band members ==
- Michael Roeslein - vocals
- George Foskaris - drums
- Matthew Frantom - guitar
- Dillon Shines - guitar, vocals
- Cory Van Cleef - bass

== Discography ==
Studio albums

- Floorboards (2011, Topshelf Records)
- Lacuna (2013, Topshelf Records)

EPs

- Floorboards (2010, self-released)
- Caravels (2011, Topshelf Records)

Splits

- Caravels/Gifts from Enola - Well Worn (2012, Topshelf Records & The Mylene Sheath)
- Caravels/Octaves (2014, Topshelf Records & Bridge Nine Records)
