= Solemn Sun =

English rock band

Jim Lockey and the Solemn Sun
- Origin: Cheltenham, England
- Genres: Rock; punk rock
- Years active: 2009–2017 2019-Present
- Label: Xtra Mile Recordings
- Members: Jim Lockey; Andy Oliveri; Simon Cripps; Chris Capewell

Jim Lockey and the Solemn Sun (formerly Solemn Sun) are an English rock band from Cheltenham, England.

The band members are; Jim Lockey (Guitar/ vocals), Andy Oliveri (Bass), Simon Cripps (Drums) and Chris Capewheel (Guitar / vocals)

== History ==
=== 2009 - 2014: Jim Lockey & The Solemn Sun ===
Formed as a Folk/Punk band The band released their debut album 'Atlases' in June 2010 on istartedthefire records. The album was recorded at Steve Winwood's Wincraft Studios and produced by MPG Engineer of the year and double Grammy Award nominated producer James Towler. Jim Lockey & The Solemn Sun signed to Xtra Mile Recordings in December 2011. They released their second album, 'Death', produced by Peter Miles on Xtra Mile in April 2012.

In 2012 Jim Lockey & The Solemn Sun played sets at festivals around the world as well as two UK headline tours. The band has played alongside the likes of Mumford & Sons, Frank Turner, Dry the River, Johnny Flynn, Alessi's Ark and Pete Doherty, with Jim rounding off 2012 opening for friend, fan and label mate Frank Turner on his UK and Ireland headline tour in November/December. February 2013 saw the band playing a 5-week headline tour of the UK and a U.S run with Dropkick Murphys, followed by appearances at South by Southwest and a short European tour. They played a number of UK/EU summer festivals in 2013.

=== 2014: Solemn Sun ===
In July 2014, the band announced they would be returning under the name of "Solemn Sun" and a change in musical style. Jim Lockey played a selection of the Jim Lockey & The Solemn Sun's former works for what he claimed to be the last ever time in an acoustic set at 2000trees.

The band released their first EP after the change in styles titled § on 13 October 2014.

=== 2022/23: Jim Lockey and the Solemn Sun ===
In early 2022 the band announced they would return as JL&TSS and a new album will be released via Xtra Mile Recordings in 2023, beginning with single 'Reno' on 12.05.23.

== Discography ==
=== Studio albums ===
- Atlases (2010) [as Jim Lockey & the Solemn Sun]
- Death (2012) [as Jim Lockey & the Solemn Sun]

=== Extended plays ===
- § (2014)
