= I'm Glad It's You =

American rock band

I'm Glad It's You is an American rock band from Redlands, California.

== History ==
The group's debut album, The Things I Never Say, was released in 2018. While touring in July 2017, the band's touring van overturned while driving near Barstow, California, which resulted in the death of their videographer, Chris Avis. This event informed the songwriting of their next album, Every Sun, Every Moon, which was produced by J. Robbins and released on 6131 Records in May 2020. Slant Magazine named the album one of its top 50 releases of 2020.

== Members ==
- Robi Brown – keyboards
- TJ Moneymaker – bass
- Kelley Bader – vocals
- Evan Dykes – guitar
- Elliott Glass – drums

== Discography ==
=== EPs ===
- June (2014)
- Daydreams EP (2015)

=== Full albums ===
- The Things I Never Say (2018)
- Every Sun, Every Moon (2020)
