= Colorblind (band) =

American rock band

- Origin: Austin, Texas, United States
- Genres: Post-hardcore; dreamcore; alternative rock
- Years active: 2017–present
- Labels: Solid State; Tooth & Nail
- Members: Travis Moseley; Tyler Moseley; Justin Page; Nicholas Asper

Colorblind is an American rock band from Austin, Texas, formed in 2017.

== History ==
The band formed in 2017 in Austin, Texas, and were initially called The Night Of. They released their self-titled EP that same year.

In 2018, the band underwent a line-up change, including a new vocalist in Travis Moseley, and soon after changed their name to Colorblind. Over the following few years, they would release a handful of one-off singles, including "Motionless".

In 2022, the band released a self-titled EP, which included the song "Everything But Faith" featuring Kellin Quinn of Sleeping With Sirens.

In 2023, Colorblind joined the Dark Waves tour in July alongside Attack Attack!, Belmont, Traitors, and Savage Hands. Later in November, they signed with Solid State Records and Tooth & Nail Records and toured with Honey Revenge and Pollyanna.

In 2025, Colorblind performed their first shows outside the U.S. with Caskets on a European tour in late February and early March. In March and April, they joined Capstan on the Cult Tour alongside True North and Not Enough Space.

In July, Colorblind played the Inkcarceration Festival and participated in the "End of Perfect World" tour alongside Catch Your Breath, Nerv, and Keith Wallen.

In September and October, they will join Blessthefall, Miss May I, and Dark Divine on the Gallows Tour across North America and will release their EP Who Sold You This Truth via Solid State Records.

== Current members ==
- Travis Moseley – vocals
- Tyler Moseley – drums
- Justin Page – guitar
- Nicholas Asper – bass

== Discography ==
List of extended plays, with selected details
Title	Album details
The Night of EP (later renamed to Colorblind EP)	Released: July 1 2017: Label: Self-released
Colorblind EP	Released: December 9 2022: Label: Self-released
Who Sold You This Truth	Released: September 12 2025: Label: Solid State Records, Tooth And Nail Records

Studio Albums

WHO SOLD YOU THIS TRUTH ++ WAS IT YOURS TO HOLD (2026)

== Singles ==
List of singles as lead artist
Title	Year	Album / EP
"Shameless"	2017	The Night of EP
"Parting Words"	2018	—N/a
"At the Wheel"	2019	—N/a
"Motionless"	2021	—N/a
"Everything but Faith" (feat. Kellin Quinn)	2022	Colorblind EP
"Way Out"	2023	—N/a
"Needle Eye"	2024	—N/a
"Haunted" (feat. Ekoh)	2024	—N/a
"Car Crash"	2025	Who Sold You This Truth
"Letdown"	2025	Who Sold You This Truth
"Misery Love Its Company"	2025	Who Sold You This Truth

=== As featured artist ===
List of singles as featured artist
Title	Year	Album
"For What It's Worth" (with Downswing)	2025	—N/a
