= Crooks (band) =

Post-hardcore band

- Origin: Cheltenham, Gloucestershire, U.K.
- Genres: Melodic hardcore; dreamcore; post-hardcore; emo; screamo
- Years active: 2009–2017, 2026–present
- Labels: Venn, Headphone Music
- Past members: Josh Rogers; Alex Pay; Oli Bendall; Jacob Dutton-Keen; Jack Batchelor; Rob Barnett; Jake Fogarty

Crooks (or Crooks UK) is an English post-hardcore band from Cheltenham, United Kingdom. Formed in 2009, the band experienced various early line-up changes, eventually settling into the members Josh Rogers (vocals), Alex Pay (guitar), Jacob Dutton-Keen (bass), Rob Barnett (guitar) and Jake Fogarty (drums). This line-up released their debut Nevermore in 2012. That year, Fogarty and Barnett departed from the band, replaced by Jack Batchelor and Oli Bendall. They released the second EP Still in 2014, quickly followed by their debut full-length album Are We All the Same Distance Apart (2015). Crooks' music was based in the sound of bands involved in the wave, however eschewed that movements emphasis on screamed vocals, by often incorporating clean singing. As they progressed, they increasingly leaned into singing and their post-rock influences, helping to define the dreamcore movement. In 2016, the band cancelled some live performances due to Rogers sustaining vocal injuries. That year, they released the single ".Nevareht", announcing it would be a part of an EP. It was never released, and the band disbanded without announcement by early 2017.

== History ==
=== 2009–2012: Formation, demo and Nevermore ===
Crooks was formed in Cheltenham in 2009 by vocalist Josh Rogers and guitarist Alex Pay. After several line-up changes, the band consisted of Rogers, Pay, bassist Jacob Dutton-Keen and drummer Jake Fogarty. On 1 October 2011, they released their four track demo tape. On 29 February 2012, they released the single "Stand Against", which was followed on March 2, by the band's debut EP Nevermore, released through Venn Records. Between 16 and 26 March 2012, they co-headlined a tour of Belgium, Austria and Germany with Welsh band Foxxes, on 1 October, they released a documentary covering the events of the tour. Between 12 and 17 June, they co-headlined a tour of Spain, again with Foxxes, which they released a documentary about on 29 July.

In 2012, Fogarty departed from the band, his role was filled by Jack Batchelor. At the time, the band had three tour dates to fulfill in mainland Europe, after which the band was planning to disband. Following the tour's first date, in Sint-Joris-Winge, Rogers approached Batchelor and asked him whether he'd like to continue the band and not disband, which Batchelor agreed to.

=== 2013–2015: Still and Are We All the Same Distance Apart ===
A two-track EP was released on July 14, 2014, under the name Still via the record label Venn Records. Between 20 November and 7 December, they toured Europe with Being as an Ocean and Vanna.

On April 9, 2015, Headphone Music, the subsidiary of the record company Equal Vision Records signed the group. On 11 April 2015, they released the single "A Few Peaceful Days". On 19 October, they released the single "Above Me", by this time guitarist Rob Barnett had been replaced by Oli Bendall. They two single were a part of their debut album Are We All the Same Distance Apart, released on October 30 of the same year. Rogers contributed guest vocals to Heart in Hand's album A Beautiful White, released on 21 November. Between 3 and 22 May, they toured the United Kingdom alongside Such Gold and Transit. Between October and November 2015, the group was the opening act for Palisades and headliner Our Last Night on their Younger Dreams Europe Tour. The tour started in Russia, with stops in Belarus, Germany and Hungary and ended in Belgium. In February 2016, the group played three concerts with Glassjaw as the opening act for Coheed and Cambria. Immediately afterwards, the group plays their first headlining European tour with Boston Manor in the opening act.

=== 2016–2017: ".Nevareht" and disbandment ===
During February 2016, the band toured mainland Europe with support from Boston Manor. However, on 26 of that month, they postponed the remaining dates, due to Rogers sustaining vocal injuries. They subsequently postponed their March 2016 tour. Between 2 and 6 March, they headlined a tour of the United Kingdom, supported by Solemn Sun, Milestones and Omaha. On these dates, Punktastic writer Jess Tagliani was "Obviously wary of damaging his throat", despite Rogers' vocals being "strong and sure". On 14 October, they released the single ".Nevareht", with a hint reading "1850". Pays revealed in an interview on 17 October, that the single would be a part of an upcoming EP, which would be a sequel to the topics explored in Nevermore.

Crooks disbanded without announcement. Rogers soon began an emo rap solo project under the name Sullii and Dutton-Keen began a career in music production In 2021, Fogarty joined Creeper. In the years during their hiatus, many fans asked about the status of the band and if they'd ever return. During a self-hosted Q&A in October 2019, Rogers said "I don't think Crooks is ever going to die, so I don't miss it."

=== 2026–present: Reunion ===
On 26 October 2026, Crooks announced they had reunited and would headline a tour of Europe between 22 April and 8 May.

== Musical style ==
Critics have categorised their music as post-hardcore, emo, dreamcore, screamo and melodic hardcore. Already Heard noted their fluidity of genre, stating "we’re left wondering what Crooks are meant to be. Are they melodic hardcore band? Are they alt rock? Do genre labels matter? Well no, but Crooks still leave us confused."

Their music was largely based in bands who were a part of the wave, however eschewed its emphasis on screamed vocals, instead incorporating melodic clean vocals. They were a forefront band in the 2010s post-rock inspired genre dreamcore, which was based around the YouTube channel Dreambound, where bands merged screamo and melodic hardcore with post-rock. As the band progressed, they increasingly leaned into post-rock. On their sole album Are We All the Same Distance Apart (2015), Rogers largely abandoned any screams. In a 2016 interview with Punktastic he explained: "It was totally my decision... All the guys were progressing so rapidly and becoming such good musicians and I was just shouting. It felt like I was not giving enough of myself to the band and that wasn’t fair."

Their music made use of emotional lyrics, high-tempo driving rhythms and atmospheric elements.

Nevermore was a concept album based on "The Raven" by Edgar Allan Poe, which also inspired the later single ".Nevareht". On ".Nevareht" and the unreleased EP it would have been a part of, they were influenced by Pvris and Brand New.

They have been cited as an influence by Thornhill, Too Close to Touch and Lovejoy.

== Members ==
Final line-up

- Josh Rogers – vocals (2009–2017)
- Alex Pay – guitar (2009–2017)
- Jacob Dutton-Keen – bass (2009–2017)
- Jack Batchelor – drums (2012–2017)
- Oli Bendall – guitar (2012–2017)

Former members

- Jake Fogarty – drums (2009–2012)
- Rob Barnett – guitar (2009–2012)

== Discography ==
Studio albums

- Are We All the Same Distance Apart (2015)

EPs

- Nevermore (2012)
- Still (2014)

Demos

- Demo (2011)
