= Hooton 3 Car =

English punk/melodic hardcore band

Hooton 3 Car was an English punk/melodic hardcore band, formed in 1989 and active until 1998. The band's members were Graham Williams (guitar, vocals), Chris Petty (guitar, vocals), Hywell Maggs (bass, vocals) and Jon Jesson (drums, vocals). Their original drummer was Stephen Emm who left the band in 1992.

Between 1992 and 1995, Hooton Three Car recorded three sessions at Maida Vale Studios in London for broadcast on John Peel's BBC Radio 1 show. These recordings were compiled on the band's 43-song discography released by Crackle! Records.

The name of the band derives from the indicators often seen on Merseyrail Wirral Line stations showing that the next train is a 3 coach train to Hooton.

== Discography ==
- "Spot Daylight (12", J-RSTR 001, JSNTGM/Rumblestrip, 1994)
- "Danny (7", Out of Step, 1995)
- "Driver (7", Out of Step 1995)
- Cramp Like a Fox (cd/lp, Out of Step, 1996)
- "Drone" (7", WOOS 10S, Out of Step)
- "Carpetburn" (7", DAMGOOD121, Damaged Goods, 1997)
- Monkey Mayor (cd/lp, Rumblestrip, 1997)
- Jesse split (7", DUMP043, Rugger Bugger/Rumblestrip, 1997)
- Lovemen split (7", snuff-030, Snuffy Smile, 1997)
- Screaming Fat Rat split (7", snuff-038, Snuffy Smile, 1998)
- By Means of Maybe (cd/lp, Rumblestrip, 1998)
- Recordings 1994-1998 (Crackle 016, Crackle!, 2003)
- A Scream From the Silence Volume One compilation LP (12", Loony Tunes Records, 1992). Two tracks included, 'Chicken Ticker" and 'Footdamage'
