= Martin House Hospice =

Coordinates: 53.9002°N 1.3438°W

- Founded: 1987
- Type: UK Charity (no. 517919)
- Purpose: Hospice for children and young people
- Location: Grove Road, Clifford, Boston Spa, Wetherby, LS23 6TX England
- Key people: Clair Holsworth, Chief Executive
- Website: www.martinhouse.org.uk

Martin House is a charity that provides hospice care for children and young people across West, North and East Yorkshire. It provides family-led care to children and young people with life-limiting and life-threatening illnesses, either at the hospice or in families' own homes.

The hospice was founded by Rev Richard Seed and officially opened by The Duchess of Kent in 1987.

Services include planned respite care, emergency care, symptom control, community care, end of life care and bereavement support. The charity also supports families whose child has died from a life-limited condition but did not access hospice care. Conditions treated include long term progressive disorders such as Duchenne muscular dystrophy, Batten's disease, cystic fibrosis, and sometimes cancer. Care can take place at the hospice in Boston Spa, or in families' own homes.

The hospice's facilities include nine specialist children's bedrooms, eight family rooms for parents and siblings, six bedrooms in an adjoining unit for teenagers and young adults – Whitby Lodge – sitting rooms, playrooms, a multi-sensory room, Jacuzzi, library and a music room. The hospice's 6-acre (24,000 m^{2}) landscaped gardens incorporate socially-inclusive outdoor play areas with wheelchair swings, a roundabout, water play area, and adventure trail.

It costs Martin House in excess of £9 million each year to provide its services across the region.
