= State Faults =

American post-hardcore band

- Also known as: Brother Bear (2010–2011)
- Origin: Santa Rosa, California, U.S.
- Genres: Screamo; post-hardcore
- Years active: 2010–2015, 2019–present
- Labels: No Sleep; Tiny Engines; Dog Nights; Deathwish Inc
- Members: Jonny Andrew; Jef Overn; Jared Wallace; Michael Weldon
- Past members: Chip Kelley; Toby Brown; Jordan James
- Website: www.statefaults.com

State Faults (formerly known as Brother Bear) are an American post-hardcore band formed in Santa Rosa, California in 2010. Noisey included their album "Resonate/Desperate" as one of the records that best captures the last decade of hardcore punk. In 2019, they were listed at number 16 on Kerrang's 50 Best American Hardcore Bands Right Now list.

== History ==
The band formed in 2010, under the name Brother Bear, releasing their debut EP, Head In the Clouds the next year. However changed their name soon after due to the large number of bands who were also operating under that name. On 8 May 2012, they released their debut album Desolate Peaks through Tiny Engine Records. On 12 November 2013, they released their sophomore album Resonate/Desperate through No Sleep Records. In 2015, Kelley departed from the band, while Chris Hansen from No Sleep Records was pushing the band to put out a new record. This led to the three remaining members deciding to officially break-up and work on a separate musical project, which would turn out to be noise rock band Slow Bloom.

In 2019, Andrew, Weldon and Wallace reformed State Faults due to increased interest by fans and began recording material. Their first performance after reforming was at Santa Rosa's Chop Shop on 18 February, with support from Outlier, Sloth & Turtle and Pushing It. Their third album Clairvoyant was released on 21 June 2019. In December 2019, Brooklyn Vegan placed Resonate/Desperate at number 95 on their top 100 punk rock and emo albums of the 2010s. In addition to this, Chris Luedtke of Metal Injection included the album as an "Honourable Mention" in his list of the greatest albums of 2019.

== Musical style ==
State Faults have primarily been categorised as screamo and post-hardcore possessing elements of black metal, post-rock, shoegazing, heavy metal, noise rock, mathcore and heavy psych. Their music often makes heavy usage of dynamics, by incorporating both ambient and cacophonous passages. Their softer sections are often utilized through the usage of reverb effects, ambient synths and occasionally spoken word. Dan Ozzi, a writer at Noisey, described their music as "what a panic attack sounds like". Some tracks, such as "Wildfires", incorporate melody and hooks into unclean vocals.

Lyrically, their music generally focuses on spirituality, makes use of references to the occult and is heavily emotional. A number of the tracks on their debut album were based on anxiety and its repercussions. In an article for No Echo, Adam Yoe described their lyrics as "meditation on trauma and healing".

They have cited influences including Loma Prieta, Suis La Lune, Pianos Become the Teeth, Mewithoutyou, the Cure, As Cities Burn, Thrice and Underoath.

== Members ==
Current

- Jonny Andrew – lead vocals, guitar (2010–2015, 2019–present)
- Jef Overn – bass (2020–present), vocals (2020–present)
- Jared Wallace – drums (2012–2015, 2019–present), guitar (2010–2012)
- Michael Weldon – guitar (2010–2015, 2023–present), vocals (2010–2015, 2019–2020, 2023-present), bass (2019–2020)

Former

- Chip Kelley – bass, vocals (2010–2015)
- Toby Brown – drums (2010–2012)

== Discography ==
Studio albums

- Desolate Peaks (2012)
- Resonate/Desperate (2013)
- Clairvoyant (2019)
- Children of the Moon (2024)

EPs

- Head In The Clouds (2011)
- Moon Sign Gemini (2020)

Singles

- Vespers (2010)
- Arrowhead (2010)
- Ugly (2012)
