= Bastions (band) =

Welsh band

- Origin: Holyhead, Anglesey, Wales
- Genres: Post-hardcore; screamo; melodic hardcore
- Years active: 2008–2015; 2022
- Labels: Holy Roar, In at the Deep End, Church Road
- Past members: Jamie McDonald; Jamie Burne; Daniel Garrod; Gareth Davies; Zachary Birchley; Kieran Brindley

Bastions were a Welsh post-hardcore band from Holyhead, Isle of Anglesey. Formed in 2008 by Jamie Burne (vocals), Jamie McDonald (guitar), Gareth Davies (bass) and Daniel Garrod (drums), the band quickly began playing nationally, especially performing in house basements. They self-released their debut EP Kingdom of Dogs in 2009, before signing to Holy Roar Records, who released their second EP Island Living (2010). Their debut album Hospital Corners (2012) was released by In at the Deep End Records. Around this time, Garrod and Brindley left the band, their roles filled by Zachary Birchley (bass) and Kieran Brindley (drums). The band released two additional solo EPs: Bedfellows Part 1: The Bastard Son (2013), Bedfellows Part 2: The Forgotten Daughter (2014); as well as a split EP with Burning Bright, before disbanding in 2015.

The band's choatic fusion of screamo, melodic hardcore and post-metal, as well as their subverision of the dominant horror imagery of the time, were widely influential on hardcore punk in the United Kingdom. They helped to establish the UKswell movement, and laid the foundation for the development of dreamcore music. They briefly reunited in 2022 to release their second album Majestic Desolation.

== History ==
Bastions were formed in Holyhead, Anglesey, Wales, in 2008, by Jamie Burne (vocals), Jamie McDonald (guitar), Daniel Garrod (bass) and Kieran Brindley (drums). Their first live performance was at Rascals Bar in Bangor, Gwynedd. With no local scene in Anglesey, they quickly began touring nationally and forming connections with other bands. Many of their shows at this time were in house basements. On 17 November 2009, they released their debut EP Kingdom of Dogs. On the 20 September 2010, they released their second EP Island Living through Holy Roar Records.

On 7 November 2011, they released their debut album Hospital Corners through In At The Deep End Records. On 31 December 2012, they released the EP Their Story Will Be Told, by this time, Garrod and Davies had departed from the group. Their roles were filled by bassist Zachary Birchley and drummer Kieran Brindley. On 18 February 2013, they released the EP Bedfellows Part 1 – The Bastard Son on Holy Roar, the first of two concept albums, In May 2013 the band did a short British tour with support from Rolo Tomassi, with gigs being notable for only costing five pound a ticket for all venues. The followup to The Bastard Son was released on 27 January 2014 as Bedfellows Part 2: the Forgotten Daughter. On 25 September 2014, they released a split EP with French band Burning Bright, through Palm Reader Records and Sieve and Sand Records. In April 2015, they toured the United Kingdom with Birds in Row. Bastions' final show was at the Black Heart in London in 2015.

The band reunited in 2022, when they released the album Majestic Desolation. They disbanded soon after.

== Musical style ==
Critics have categorised their music as post-hardcore, chaotic hardcore, alternative hardcore, screamo and melodic hardcore. They often incorporate elements of post-rock, post-metal, shoegaze, blues, black metal, alternative rock, sludge metal, drone music, D-beat and crust punk. BBC Radio DJ Adam Walton called them "label-resistant", "exist[ing] between twilight genres of noise and fury".

Bastions' music was experimental, making use of sudden tempo changes, emotional guitar riffs, dynamic switches between "frantic" fast sections and "dreary" slow ones. Their songs were often lyric-centric, particularly on the two Bedfellows EPs, which were concept EPs. They followed two separate children who suffer from psychiatric disorders and their familial troubles. They were inspired by Burton Blatt's books Christmas in Purgatory (1966) and Burne's institutionalised great grandmother. Some of their songs madee use of spoken word segments.

Louder Than War writer Guy Manchester stated they have "an idiosyncratic sound being as modern as hardcore gets". Metal Hammer writer Toby Cook called them "vaguely Sabbath-ian" and "like Discharge losing a street fight to Coalesce". Punktastic writer Chris Marshman called them "Defeater but less boring". Punktastic writer Tom Aylott described their sound as a "mix [of] crust-punk in the vein of Trap Them and Cursed, technical riff-heavy hardcore along the lines of the Chariot and even a hefty dose of post-metal a la Cult Of Luna to devastating effect".

They cited influences including Rites of Spring, Fugazi, the Dillinger Escape Plan, Defeater, Touché Amoré, Pianos Become the Teeth, Make Do and Mend, Hot Snakes, Cult of Luna, Cold Cave, Cloud Nothings, the National and Weekend.

== Legacy ==
Bastions were one of the most influential bands in 2010s hardcore punk in the United Kingdom, with Noizze writer Dan Hillier stating "it's futile to even imagine the scene without Bastions' input or influence". They were one of the most prominent bands in Welsh hardcore, and pioneers of the Welsh post-hardcore scene. In the years following Hospital Corners (2012), many bands began to draw upon its sound and visuals, particularly its guitar textures and depressive atmosphere. Punkstatic called them "Wales (and Britain's in general) own Have Heart", and a 2014 article by DIY writer Tomas Doyle stated "if this band were American or had the right pair of jeans on, everyone would be slathering themselves in their own erotic juices and declaring Bastions the best thing since sliced bread by now".

In 2016, Metal Hammer writer Stephen Hill named Hospital Corners as the seventh "most underrated UK hardcore record". BBC Radio DJ Adam Walton called them "one of the UK's busiest and most highly regarded bands", as well as "Unforgettable. Unbelievable... Introduce Bastions to a friend and you will have a friend for life."

Alongside Pariso, Goodtime Boys, Kerouac and the Long Haul, Bastions were a foundational act to the UKswell movement, which began around 2009. Typified by angry, depressive and sentimental post-hardcore, UKswell actively subverted the horror imagery and toxic masculinity of hardcore of the time, instead seeking radical inclusion. It was a response to the Wave in the United States. Bastions also laid the foundation for what would become dreamcore.

They have been cited as an influence by Employed to Serve and Casey.

== Members ==
Final line-up

- Jamie Burne – vocals (2008–2015; 2022)
- Jamie McDonald – guitar (2008–2015; 2022)
- Gareth Davies – bass (2010–2012; 2022)
- Kieran Brindley – drums (2013–2015; 2022)

Previous members

- Daniel Garrod – drums, (2008–2013)
- Zachary Birchley — bass (2012–2015)

== Discography ==
Studio albums

- Hospital Corners (2011)
- Majestic Desolation (2022)

EPs

- Kingdom of Dogs (2009)
- Island Living (2010)
- Bedfellows Part 1: The Bastard Son (2013)
- Bedfellows Part 2: The Forgotten Daughter (2014)
- Swan Songs (2014; split EP with Burning Bright)
