= Goodtime Boys =

Welsh post-hardcore band

- Origin: Cardiff, Wales
- Genres: Screamo; melodic hardcore; emo; post-hardcore
- Years active: 2009–2015
- Labels: Bridge Nine, Tangled Talk, Palm Reader
- Spinoff of: The Automatic
- Past members: Alex Pennie; Kai Woolen-Lewis; Samuel Phipps; Leigh McAndrew; Tom Pitts; Lewis Johns; Casey McHale

The Goodtime Boys was a Welsh post-hardcore band from Cardiff. Formed in 2009 by Alex Pennie (vocals) Kai Woolen-Lewis (guitar), Samuel Phipps (guitar), Leigh McAndrew (bass) and Tom Pitts (drums), the band's merger of screamo, melodic hardcore and post-rock put them as a forefront act in the post-hardcore movement UKswell. They released two studio albums, two solo EPs and two split EPs.

== History ==
In 2009, the Goodtime Boys was formed by guitarists Kai Woolen-Lewis and Samuel Phipps, bassist Leigh McAndrew, drummer Tom Pitts and vocalist Alex Pennie, with the intention to play a small number of low capacity shows, in a chaotic musical style inspired by the Chariot. Their name was chosen as a joke, suggested by a friend at a house party. Its members were from across the United Kingdom, though they were based in Cardiff. On 29 May 2010, they released a split EP with Solutions.

On 30 May 2011, they released the EP Are We Now, Or Have We Ever Been through Tangled Talk Records. Between 13 and 17 June 2012, they toured the UK supporting Suis La Lune, alongside Veils. On 25 June 2012, they released the EP Every Landscape through Bridge Nine Records. On 25 July 2012, they released the single "Callous", premiered by DIY. It was a part of their debut album What's Left to Let Me Go, released on 28 August via Bridge Nine Records. From the 21 to 31 October 2012, they toured the UK with Rolo Tomassi and Oathbreaker. Between 16 March and 6 April, they toured the United States alongside Loma Prieta.

On 11 November 2013, they released a split EP was released with the US emo band Self Defense Family on Palm Reader Records. In 2014, Lewis Johns joined on guitar and Casey McHale on drums. On 4 April 2014, they released the single "Moral Decay" Between 24 April and 1 May 2014, they headlined a tour of the UK with support from Grappler. On 20 May, they released the single "Wallflower". The second album, called Rain, was released on 19 May 2014. Between 26 and 29 May, they supported Birds in Row on the lowlands tour, then headlined a tour of central Europe between 23 and 31 June. On 26 July 2014, they played Fluff Fest. Between 30 October and 12 November, they toured the United States with Self Defense Family. The group toured mainland Europe with Landscapes, More Than Life, Caspian and Defeater. On January 6, 2015, the group announced their dissolution, citing that "the band has become harder to manage over the past year or so and various things have contributed to us deciding to end it".

== Musical style and legacy ==
Critics have categorised the Goodtime Boy's music as melodic hardcore, screamo, melodic emotional hardcore, emo and post-hardcore. They incorporated elements of post-rock, indie emo and math rock.

The band's vocals were generally screamed. On occasion, they would use clean singing, a practice uncommon amongst their contemporaries. Songs were often lyric-centric, often being poetic and philosophical. Sometimes, they would make use of spoken word vocals. Instrumentally, they made of grandiose guitar leads, often melodic and emotional, as well as both dissonant and twinkly riffs. The BBC called their music "fast-paced, intelligent hardcore". Rain was more melodic, including more singing.

They have cited influences including Suis La Lune, the Saddest Landscape, Pianos Become the Teeth and the Chariot.

=== Legacy ===
The Goodtime Boys were one of the forefront UK emo bands of their time, with a 2010 BBC article, noting them as one of the bands forming the future of Welsh punk. In 2013, Crack magazine called them "mainstream darlings to be".

Alongside Pariso, Bastions, Kerouac and the Long Haul, the Goodtime Boys were a foundational act to the UKswell movement, which began around 2009. Typified by angry, depressive and sentimental post-hardcore, UKswell actively subverted the horror imagery and toxic masculinity of hardcore of the time, instead seeking radical inclusion. It would go on to produce Ithaca, Vales, Svalbard and early Employed to Serve. UKswell was a response to the United States movement the wave, with BrooklynVegan editor Andrew Sacher also nothing them as a part of the wave.

They were cited as a favourite by Kris Coombs-Roberts of Funeral for a Friend.

== Members ==
Final line-up

- Alex Pennie – vocals (2009–2015)
- Samuel Phipps – guitar (2009–2015)
- Leigh McAndrew – bass (2009–2015)
- Lewis Johns – guitar (2014–2015)
- Casey McHale – drums (2014–2015)

Former members

- Kai Woolen-Lewis – guitar (2009–2014)
- Tom Pitts – drums (2009–2014)

== Discography ==
Studio albums

- What's Left to Let Go (2012)
- Rain (2014)

EPs

- Goodtime Boys / Solutions (2010; split EP with Solutions)
- Are We Now, or Have We Ever Been (2011)
- Every Landscape (2012)
- Good time Boys / Self Defense Family (2013; split EP with Self Defense Family)
