= Jason Aalon Butler =

American musician

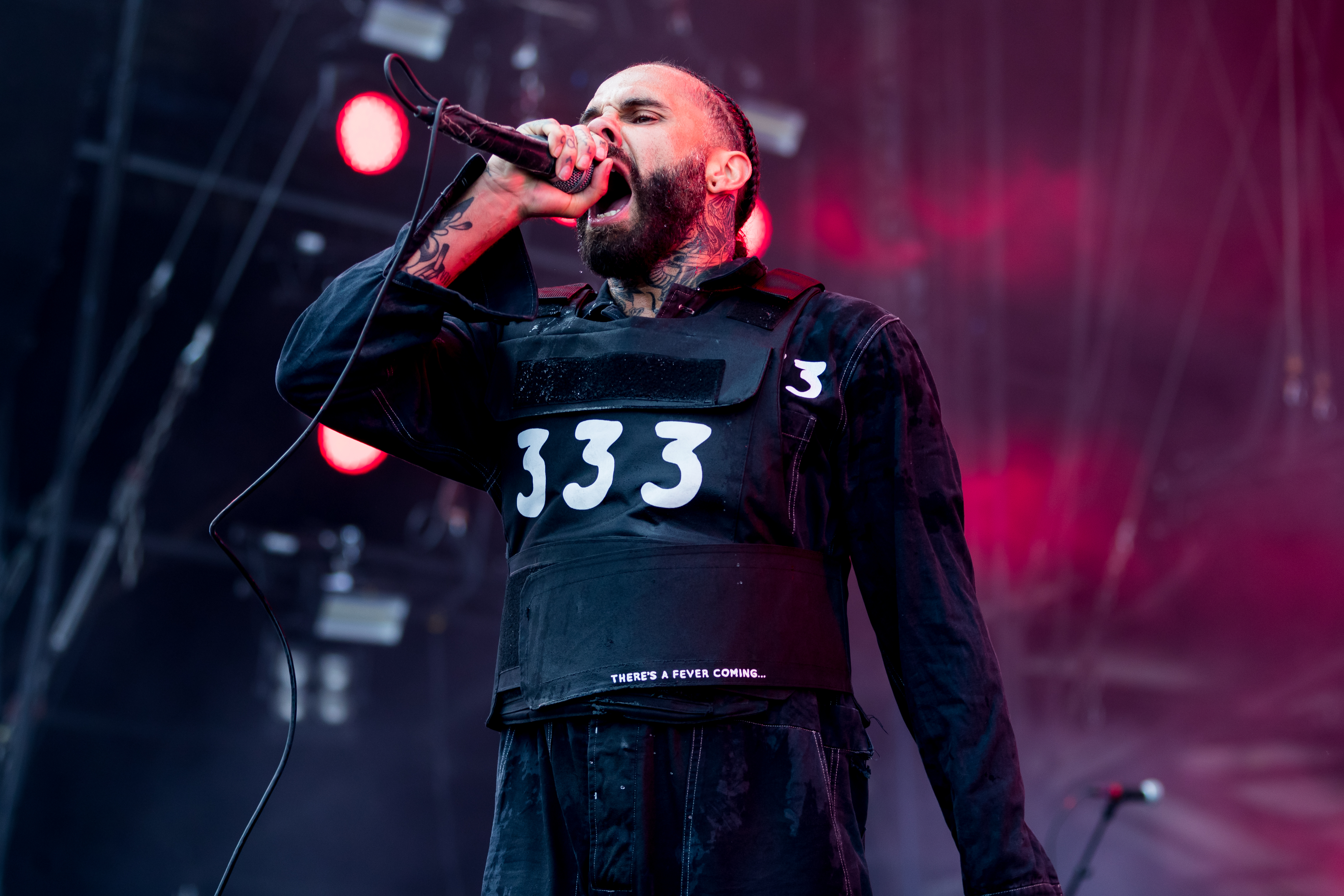
- Butler performing in 2019

Background information
- Born: Jason Aalon Alexander Butler; July 17, 1986 (age 40); Inglewood, California, U.S.
- Genres: Post-hardcore; art punk; experimental rock; metalcore; hardcore punk; rapcore; alternative metal; rap rock
- Occupations: Singer; songwriter; musician; rapper
- Instruments: Vocals; guitar; drums
- Years active: 2002–present
- Labels: 333 Wreckords Crew; Roadrunner; Tragic Hero; At One Records; Epitaph
- Member of: Fever 333; Letlive; Pressure Cracks

Jason Aalon Alexander Butler (born July 17, 1986) is an American musician and political activist from Inglewood, California. He is best known as the lead singer of the post-hardcore band Letlive. He is currently part of the rapcore band Fever 333 and the hardcore punk band Pressure Cracks.

Butler is known for his erratic stage performance, which involves high-energy nonstop movement, dance routines, smashing of onstage objects, frequent crowd surfing, and climbing festival stages.

== Biography ==
=== Early life ===
Butler was born and raised in Inglewood, California, where he was forced into maturity quicker than many others his age. He is the son of Aalon Butler, lead singer of the soul group, Aalon. Growing up with an African-American father and Scottish mother, Butler at times had difficulty fitting in with a lot of the white children in his grade school, as they would sometimes ask why his mother was white and his father was not.

=== Musical career ===
Growing up with his father being a part of the music scene, music has always been an essential part of Butler's life, although it was his uncle from Scotland who introduced him to rock music. He bought him the albums Sixteen Stone by Bush and OK Computer by Radiohead. Butler has said that Bush are still his favorite band. Other early inspirations include artists such as James Brown and Michael Jackson.

==== Letlive ====
Butler got together with Keeyan Majdi, Alex Haythorn, Christian Johansen, and Ben Sharp in 2002 to form letlive., a post-hardcore band based out of Los Angeles. The band have released four full-length records, and were signed to Epitaph Records. Each track features lyrics that come from personal experiences throughout Butler's life that he has been unable to say in any other way than through music. Butler states that in Fake History he was "A little more apprehensive to say certain things, but challenged myself to say those things in The Blackest Beautiful." The band's fourth and final full-length album titled If I’m The Devil was released on June 10, 2016. On April 28, 2017, the band announced their breakup through social media sites. Butler was the only remaining original member of Letlive at the time of their breakup.

==== Fever 333 ====
Following his Letlive break up, Jason teamed up with former The Chariot guitarist Stephen Harrison and Night Verses drummer Aric Improta to create Fever 333 in July 2017, a rapcore band who had their debut performance in a donut shop parking lot. On August 12, 2017, the band debuted their first studio recorded song 'We're Coming In' which takes aim at the police. Fever 333's debut EP Made An America was released on March 23 and Wall of Sound have given it an 8/10 stating it's a "raw, hard-hitting and in your face, but not only will it get your blood pumping and body moving, hopefully you’ll learn a thing or two about the cause and movement behind the band and how they intend to use their voices for the greater good of Americans and those feeling the impacts of authority injustice around the world." On January 18, 2019, the band released their debut full-length album Strength in Numb333rs and did a full-length tour with Bring Me the Horizon and Thrice.

=== Gentlemen in Real Life ===
Butler created his own clothing line called "Gentlemen in Real Life", or G.I.R.L. In an interview with Blunt Magazine, Butler stated that he has always been passionate about fashion and clothing since he grew up with nothing. His artist for the line, Jonathan Whitehead, is a reputable artist known around the South Bay. Each week the brand releases a new item, ranging from clothing and accessories, to soap and oils. G.I.R.L is trying to redefine what it means to be a gentleman and how a gentleman would present oneself.

=== 333 Wreckords Crew ===
In October 2019, Butler founded the not-for-profit independent record label 333 Wreckords Crew, stating that "In my mind this community would thrive due to its unique focus on ethics, progressiveness, a symbiotic structuring and, of course, dope art". Signees include Nova Twins and Guerilla Warfare.

== Personal life ==
Butler follows a straight edge lifestyle and, while "it was a group of people I identified with", he has a skeptical stance towards the movement now because "it itself has shown me bits of the culture that have ostracized and been quite hateful to those that don’t subscribe". In an interview with Noisey, Butler stated that he has been sober since childhood because he did not like the "fever dreams" and "strange way of thinking" that are brought on by drugs. He has expressed that his reckless behavior "may seem like self-abandonment, but it is simply just me allowing myself to feel something that I wasn’t ever able to feel growing up" and that he does not believe in performing any acts that cause harm on others.

Butler married New Zealand musician Gin Wigmore in September 2014. In June 2017, the couple announced that they were expecting a baby. Their first son was born in 2017. Their second son was born in 2020. The couple divorced in 2026.

== Discography ==
=== Letlive ===
- Speak Like You Talk (2005)
- Fake History (2010)
- The Blackest Beautiful (2013)
- If I'm the Devil... (2016)

=== Pressure Cracks ===
- Pressure Cracks - EP (2018)
- This Is Called Survival - EP (2020)

=== Fever 333 ===
- Made an America (2018)
- Strength in Numb333rs (2019)
- Wrong Generation (2020)
- Darker White (2024)

=== Guest appearances ===
Year	Song	Artist	Album or single	Source
2011	"Carcinoma"	Dead and Divine	Antimacy	
2012	"I'm (Not) the One"	Your Demise	The Golden Age	
2012	"Can’t Bring Me Down"	The King Blues	Long Live the Struggle	
2012	"Tangled in the Great Escape"	Pierce the Veil	Collide with the Sky	
2013	"Put Em Up"	Alvin Risk	JunkFood	
2013	"Scissor Hands"	Stray from the Path	Anonymous	
2013	"Try It Out" (Put Em Up Mix)	Skrillex and Alvin Risk	Try It Out	
2014	"Wide Eyed"	The Ghost Inside	Dear Youth	
2015	"Stained Glass Ceilings"	The Wonder Years	No Closer To Heaven	
2017	"Crash"	The Bloody Beetroots	The Great Electronic Swindle	
2017	"Price of Living" (featuring Dennis Lyxzén)	Ecca Vandal	Ecca Vandal	
2019	"Blow Me"	The Used	Heartwork	
2020	"Pulled Pork"	Bob Vylan	We Live Here	
2020	"Broken Dreams"	Fresno	Broken Dreams	
2021	"Loud"	Sullivan King	Loud	
2022	"Swerve"	Papa Roach	Ego Trip	
2025	"Head in the Clouds"	Unprocessed	Angel	
