= Letlive discography =

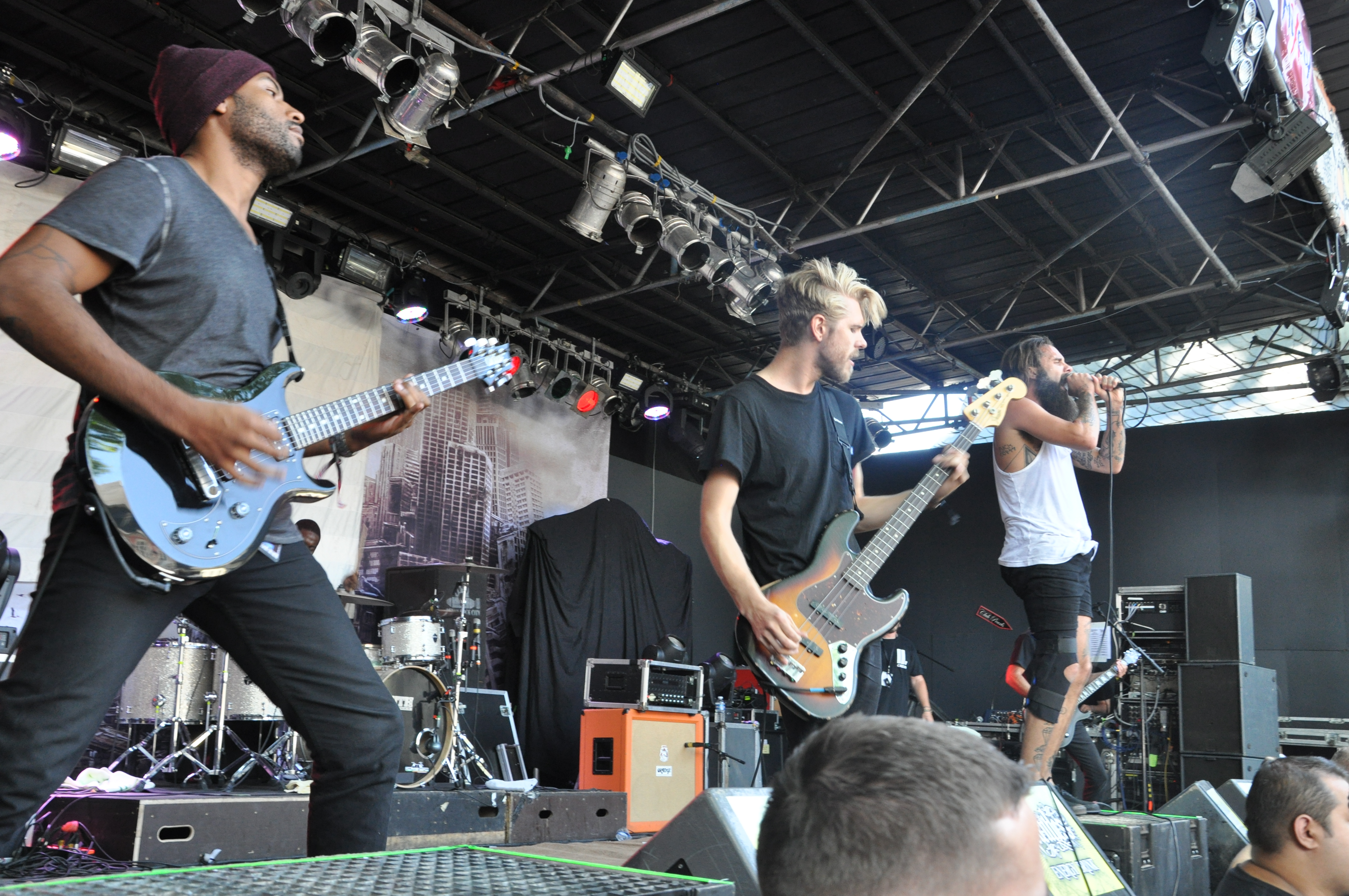
- Members of Letlive performing in 2014. From left to right: Jean Nascimento, Ryan Jay Johnson and Jason Butler.
- Studio albums: 4
- EPs: 1
- Singles: 4
- Music videos: 7

The discography of Letlive, an American rock band, consists of four studio albums, one extended play (EP), four singles and seven music videos. Letlive was formed in Los Angeles, California in 2002 and released its debut EP Exhaustion, Salt Water, and Everything in Between on At One Records the following year. In 2005, the band released its full-length debut album Speak Like You Talk. After a number of lineup changes, the group signed with Tragic Hero Records and released its second studio album Fake History in 2010.

In 2011, Letlive signed with Epitaph Records and reissued Fake History with a number of additional tracks. After more lineup changes, in 2013 the band released third album The Blackest Beautiful, which was well received by critics. The album also gave the group its first experience of chart success, reaching number 62 on the UK Albums Chart. 2016's follow-up, If I'm the Devil..., charted in the United States and the United Kingdom, as well as in Australia, Germany and New Zealand for the first time in the band's career.

== Studio albums ==
List of studio albums, with selected chart positions
Title	Album details	Peak chart positions									
Title	Album details	US Alt.	US Hard	US Indie	US Rock	AUS	GER	NZ Heat.	UK	UK Indie	UK Rock
Speak Like You Talk	Released: October 25, 2005; Label: At One; Format: CD	—	—	—	—	—	—	—	—	—	—
Fake History	Released: April 13, 2010; Label: Tragic Hero; Format: CD	—	—	—	—	—	—	—	—	—	—
The Blackest Beautiful	Released: July 9, 2013; Label: Epitaph; Formats: CD, LP, DL	—	—	—	—	—	—	—	62	4	12
If I'm the Devil...	Released: June 10, 2016; Label: Epitaph; Formats: CD, LP, DL	16	7	14	24	18	70	9	97	5	11
"—" denotes a release that did not register on that chart or was not issued in that region.

== Extended plays ==
List of extended plays
Title	Album details
Exhaustion, Salt Water, and Everything in Between	Released: 2003; Label: At One; Format: CD

== Demos ==
List of extended plays
Title	Album details
The Solid State Aftermath	Released: 2002; Label: A Tough Guy Recording; Format: CD

== Singles ==
List of singles, showing year released and album name
Title	Year	Album
"Banshee (Ghost Fame)"	2013	The Blackest Beautiful
"Younger"	2013	The Blackest Beautiful
"Good Mourning, America"	2016	If I'm the Devil...
"Reluctantly Dead"	2016	If I'm the Devil...

== Music videos ==
List of music videos, showing year released and director(s)
Title	Year	Director(s)	Ref.
"Showcase Heart"	2003	Matt Parker	
"Casino Columbus"	2010	Hans van Brill	
"The Sick, Sick, 6.8 Billion"	2011	unknown	
"Renegade 86"	2011	Mark Forrer	
"Muther"	2012	unknown	
"Banshee (Ghost Fame)"	2013	Dannel Escallon	
"Younger"	2013	Ernie Gilbert	
"Good Mourning, America"	2016	Eric Richter	
