= The Ghost Inside =

The Ghost Inside may refer to:

- The Ghost Inside (film), a 2005 Chinese film
- The Ghost Inside (band), an American band formed in 2004
  - The Ghost Inside (album), a 2020 album by the band
- "The Ghost Inside", a song on the 2010 Broken Bells album Broken Bells
