= Cream City =

Cream City may refer to:

- Milwaukee, a city in the United States known as Cream City
- Cream City, Ohio, a community in the United States
- Cream City (album), a 1977 album by Aalon

== See also ==
- Cream City brick, common in the Milwaukee area
