= The Golden Age (Your Demise album) =

Studio album by Your Demise
- Released: 26 March 2012
- Genre: Melodic hardcore, hardcore punk
- Label: Visible Noise (UK), Distort Entertainment (Canada)

Your Demise chronology
The Kids We Used to Be... (2010)	The Golden Age (2012)	Three for Free (2012)

Singles from The Golden Age
- 1. "Forget About Me" Released: 3 January 2012

The Golden Age is the fourth studio album by British hardcore punk band Your Demise.

The first single from the album, Forget About Me, was released on 3 January 2012, with the album following on 26 March 2012.

== Track listing ==
No.	Title	Length
1.	"The Golden Age"	2:28
2.	"These Lights"	2:47
3.	"Born a Snake"	2:56
4.	"Push Me Under"	2:34
5.	"Paper Trails" (featuring Dannika Webber of Evarose)	2:29
6.	"Forget About Me" (featuring David Wood of Down to Nothing and Terror)	2:41
7.	"I'm (Not) the One" (featuring Jason Butler of Letlive)	2:45
8.	"Never a Dull Moment"	2:43
9.	"The Colour of Envy"	2:54
10.	"A Decade Drifting" (featuring Josh Franceschi of You Me at Six)	3:26
11.	"Worthless" (featuring Theo Kyndynis of Last Witness, Ajay Jones formerly of Brutality Will Prevail and Louis Gauthier of Breaking Point and Brutality Will Prevail)	4:01
12.	"Everything You Know" (B-Side)	2:32
Total length:		31:44

== Personnel ==
The album features a number of guest vocalists, including Jason Butler of Letlive, Josh Franceschi of You Me at Six, Louis Gauthier of Breaking Point and Brutality Will Prevail, Ajay Jones formerly of Brutality Will Prevail, Theo Kindynis of Last Witness, Dannika Webber of Evarose and David Wood of Down to Nothing and Terror.

Your Demise

- Ed McRae – vocals
- Stuart Paice – guitar
- Daniel Osborne – guitar
- James Sampson – bass
- James Tailby – drums

Guest appearances

- Jason Butler of Letlive – guest vocals on track 7 ("I'm (Not) the One")
- Josh Franceschi of You Me at Six – guest vocals on track 10 ("A Decade Drifting")
- Louis Gauthier of Breaking Point and Brutality Will Prevail – guest vocals on track 11 ("Worthless")
- Ajay Jones formerly of Brutality Will Prevail – guest vocals on track 11 ("Worthless")
- Theo Kindynis of Last Witness – guest vocals on track 11 ("Worthless")
- Dannika Webber of Evarose – guest vocals on track 5 ("Paper Trails")
- David Wood of Down to Nothing and Terror – guest vocals on track 6 ("Forget About Me")
- Ben Phillips of Fastlane – all backing vocals/harmonies
