= Cold Chillin' =

EP by Your Demise
- Released: 14 May 2013
- Genre: Hardcore punk
- Length: 22:41
- Label: Impericon and Pinky Swear Records

Your Demise chronology
Three For Free (2012)	Cold Chillin' (2013)

Cold Chillin' is the third EP from British hardcore punk band Your Demise. Released on 14 May 2013 in conjunction with Impericon and Pinky Swear Records, it is the first official work since the band split from Visible Noise Records.

== Touring ==
In February 2013, the band toured Europe in support of the album.

== Critical reception ==
Bring The Noise UK describes "Karma", the first video from the album as being "bittersweet lyrics and meth-like addictive chorus" that "contrasts greatly with the mainstream approaches that the 2012’s album took".

== Track listing ==
1. Karma - 3:20
2. A Song to No-One - 3:10
3. Nearly Home - 2:35
4. Just Like the End - 2:46
5. Everything That You Know - 2:32
6. Footnote - 3:29
7. Sad but True - 4:49
