= Antimacy =

Studio album by Dead and Divine
- Released: August 11, 2011
- Recorded: 2011
- Genre: Post-hardcore
- Length: 37:00
- Label: Distort Entertainment
- Producer: Jordan Valeriote

Dead and Divine chronology
The Machines We Are (2009)	Antimacy (2011)

Antimacy is the third and final full-length studio album by Canadian post-hardcore band Dead and Divine. It was released on August 11, 2011.

== Overview ==
The band officially released the name for their next upcoming album titled Antimacy on January 25 on their Myspace. Antimacy debuted at #53 on the Canadian Albums Chart.

Chris Le-Masters Commented :

I want these songs to mean something to people – even if it’s just a fraction of what they mean to us. We just want to play them for people,” and for Dead and Divine, it doesn’t matter if its 5 or 500 in front of them, “as long as they fuckin’ bring it – rest assured, we will!

== Track listing ==
All tracks are written by Dead and Divine.

No.	Title	Length
1.	"Asphyxia Fiend"	2:46
2.	"Grim Love"	3:15
3.	"Slumlord"	4:14
4.	"Antimacy"	3:23
5.	"Midnight Society"	3:06
6.	"Cult/Misleader"	3:16
7.	"Carcinoma" (featuring Jason Aalon Butler of Letlive.)	3:43
8.	"It Sleeps in Bliss"	4:07
9.	"Ditch Pig"	3:12
10.	"Nothing Is Alright"	2:17
11.	"Teenage Rot"	3:59
Total length:		44:58

== Charts ==
Chart (2011)	Peak position
Canadian Albums Chart	53

Chart (2011)	Peak position
Canadian Hard Rock	4

Chart (2011)	Peak position
iTunes Alternative Chart	4

== Personnel ==
Dead and Divine

- Matt Tobin - Vocals
- Chris Le-Masters - Guitar
- Sebastian Leuth - Guitar
- Kellan Lindsay - Bass
- Kelly Bilan - Drums

Production

- Jordan Valeriote - Production
