= Dear Youth =

Studio album by the Ghost Inside
- Released: November 17, 2014
- Genre: Metalcore; melodic hardcore
- Length: 42:34
- Label: Epitaph
- Producer: Jeremy McKinnon, Andrew Wade

The Ghost Inside chronology
Get What You Give (2012)	Dear Youth (2014)	The Ghost Inside (2020)

Dear Youth is the fourth album by American metalcore band the Ghost Inside, and was released on November 17, 2014. It is the last release to feature guitarist Aaron Brooks. The album spawned two major singles: in order of release, "Avalanche" and "Dear Youth (Day 52)". Music videos were released for "Out Of Control", "Dear Youth (Day 52)", and "Move Me". An official live video was released for "Avalanche". Dear Youth was the last album released before the band's drastic tour bus crash that killed their driver and inflicted life-threatening injuries to the band members.

== Track listing ==
No.	Title	Length
1.	"Avalanche"	3:32
2.	"Move Me"	3:24
3.	"Out of Control"	3:38
4.	"With the Wolves"	3:53
5.	"Mercy"	4:16
6.	"Phoenix Flame"	4:17
7.	"Dear Youth (Day 52)"	3:57
8.	"Wide Eyed" (featuring Jason Aalon Butler)	3:31
9.	"My Endnote"	4:02
10.	"The Other Half"	3:56
11.	"Blank Pages"	4:08
Total length:		42:34

== Credits ==
All personnel per the album's liner notes.

The Ghost Inside

- Jonathan Vigil – lead vocals
- Aaron Brooks – lead guitar, backing vocals
- Jim Riley – bass, backing vocals
- Zack Johnson – rhythm guitar
- Andrew Tkaczyk – drums

Production

- Produced by Jeremy McKinnon & Andrew Wade
- Engineered by Andrew Wade, at The Wade Studios
- Mixed by David Bendeth
- Mastered by Ted Jensen
- Composers: David Tiano (3), Jeremy McKinnon & Andrew Wade
- Phonographic Copyright: Epitaph
- Art direction by Jonathan Vigil
- Layout by Jason Link
- Artwork by Colin Marks

== Charts ==
Chart (2014)	Peak position
Australian Albums (ARIA)	16
Austrian Albums (Ö3 Austria)	66
Belgian Albums (Ultratop Flanders)	172
German Albums (Offizielle Top 100)	65
Swiss Albums (Schweizer Hitparade)	95
UK Rock & Metal Albums (OCC)	33
UK Independent Albums (OCC)	43
US Billboard 200	63
US Independent Albums (Billboard)	9
US Top Hard Rock Albums (Billboard)	6
US Top Rock Albums (Billboard)	15
