= Arise and Ruin =

Canadian metalcore band

- Origin: Guelph, Ontario, Canada
- Genres: Metalcore, melodic death metal
- Years active: 2005-2009
- Labels: Victory Records, Stereo Dynamite Recordings
- Members: Ryan Bauchman; Brent Munger; Sam Pattison; Ben Alexis; Derek Prince-Cox; Matt Hammond; Greg Richmond

Arise and Ruin was a Canadian metalcore band from Guelph, Ontario. Its members were Ryan Bauchman (vocals), Ben Alexis (bass), Derek Prince-Cox (drums), and guitarists Brent Munger, Matt Hammond, Sam Pattison, and Greg Richmond.

== History ==
Arise and Ruin formed in 2005, and independently released the five-track EP Arise and Ruin. In 2005, the group toured Canada with Silverstein, Underoath, Bleeding Through and Protest the Hero.

They then signed with Toronto's Stereo Dynamite Recordings and, in 2006, released the five-track EP The Fear Of.

In 2006, they signed with Victory Records and, in October, released their first album, The Final Dawn, through American label Victory Records. They then toured with Misery Index, A Perfect Murder, Between the Buried and Me, The Red Chord, August Burns Red, and Cephalic Carnage.

2007 was a difficult year for the band. In August 2008, they issued a news release which stated, in part: "the last year has been rough...We have been walked on, ignored, lied to, made to feel worthless, watched friends call it quits, persevered through personal struggles, [and] toured this continent endlessly."

The band toured in 2008 with Emarosa and Dead and Devine.

In May 2009, they released the album Night Storms Hailfire, which was recorded and produced by Ian Blurton. They performed their last show, on October 22, 2009, at Toronto's Mod Club Theatre, then disbanded. In 2010, Prince-Cox, Munger and Richmond formed the band Wakeless.

In March 2018, Arise and Ruin reunited to play shows in Guelph and Hamilton, Ontario.

== Discography ==
=== Albums ===
- The Final Dawn (Victory Records, 2007)
- Night Storms Hailfire (Victory Records, 2009)

=== EPs ===
- Arise And Ruin (2005), Stereo Dynamite
- The Fear Of (2006), Stereo Dynamite
