= Aalon =

American soul musical group

Aalon is an American soul group from Los Angeles formed by lead singer and guitarist Aalon Butler.

Butler played guitar for Eric Burdon in the 1970s prior to forming the band Aalon, which signed to Arista Records in 1977. Their debut album, Cream City, reached #45 on the Billboard R&B Albums chart, while the title single peaked at #44 on the R&B Singles chart.

Butler eventually dismantled the group prior to recording a second album, though he toured in the late 1970s and early 1980s. In the latter half of the 1980s he quit music to take care of his infant son. His son, Jason Aalon Butler, best known as the former lead singer of the post-hardcore band Letlive, is currently part of the rapcore band Fever 333.

Their song "Rock 'N' Roll Gangster" was featured in an episode of The Boondocks, specifically "The Story of Gangstalicious 2".
