= The Ghost Inside (album) =

2020 album by The Ghost Inside

Studio album by the Ghost Inside
- Released: June 5, 2020
- Recorded: May 2019—February 2020
- Studios: The Audio Compound, Orlando, Florida; Graphic Nature Audio, Belleville, New Jersey
- Genres: Metalcore; melodic hardcore
- Length: 39:11
- Label: Epitaph
- Producers: Will Putney; Jeremy McKinnon

The Ghost Inside chronology
Dear Youth (2014)	The Ghost Inside (2020)	Searching for Solace (2024)

Singles from The Ghost Inside
- 1. "Aftermath" Released: April 22, 2020; 2. "Pressure Point" Released: May 12, 2020

The Ghost Inside is the fifth album by American metalcore band The Ghost Inside. The album was released on June 5, 2020, through Epitaph Records. It is the band's first release since they were involved in a serious tour bus crash in 2015, and is also the first to feature rhythm guitarist Chris Davis, who joined the band in 2016 after serving as a touring member, and the first to feature Zach Johnson on lead guitar.

On November 19, 2015, The Ghost Inside's tour bus collided with a semi-trailer truck just outside of El Paso, Texas. Both drivers died, and several band and crew members received serious injuries; vocalist Jonathan Vigil sustained a fractured back, damaged ligaments, and two broken ankles, while drummer Andrew Tkaczyk spent ten days in a coma and had one of his legs amputated. Although they were invited on Warped Tour in 2017, The Ghost Inside had to cancel their performance, as they were still recovering from the collision. They held their first practice session in 2018, and began working on new music in early 2019. The album was produced by Jeremy McKinnon of A Day to Remember and Will Putney of Fit for an Autopsy.

The Ghost Inside was a return to form for the band, drawing comparisons to previous releases Returners (2010) and Dear Youth (2014). Music critics largely praised The Ghost Inside's technical skills within the metalcore genre, as well as the lyrical messages of hope and catharsis. While the album was not as commercially successful domestically as its predecessors, reaching only number 141 on the US Billboard 200, The Ghost Inside was a top-ten chart entry in Australia and Germany, peaking at number five and number six on the ARIA Charts and Offizielle Top 100 respectively.

== Background ==
On the morning of November 19, 2015, the tour bus being used by metalcore band The Ghost Inside collided with a semi-trailer truck outside El Paso, Texas, while en route to a show in Phoenix, Arizona. The bus driver died, and one other fatality was reported in the accident. While all members of the band and crew survived, many received serious injuries. Lead vocalist Jonathan Vigil, lead guitarist Zach Johnson, and drummer Andrew Tkaczyk were taken by helicopter to the University Medical Center of El Paso, and were reported to be in critical condition. On January 13, 2016, Vigil described his injuries in an Instagram post, which included a fractured back, damaged ligaments, and two broken ankles. Two days later, Tkaczyk said he had been in a coma for ten days following the accident and that one of his legs had been amputated.

On March 22, 2016, Warped Tour founder Kevin Lyman announced via livestream The Ghost Inside would play at the festival in 2017. Three days later, The Ghost Inside announced that touring guitarist Chris Davis, formerly of Texas in July, would be joining the band in a permanent capacity. On February 10, 2017, Vigil announced the band members were not healthy enough to perform at the festival. Lyman continued to hold a spot for them on future Warped Tours.

The Ghost Inside held their first practice session since the accident on April 17, 2018, and shortly afterwards announced on Facebook that the band planned to return after recovery. In January 2019, a fan asked the band on Twitter if they were working on new music; the band responded with a photograph of themselves. On February 15, 2019, The Ghost Inside released samples of new material via Twitter. On August 16, the band announced they would release a new album, and that they were working with Jeremy McKinnon of A Day to Remember and Will Putney of Fit for an Autopsy. McKinnon had produced the band's two previous albums, Get What You Give (2012) and Dear Youth (2014); Andrew Wade also returned as an audio engineer from the production of Dear Youth.

== Composition and production ==
Described as metalcore and melodic hardcore, The Ghost Inside is a record that is intended to channel the sound of the band's 2010 album Returners. Vigil told Josh Chesler of Spin the long hiatus between albums, coupled with the band's high-profile accident, meant "we knew we had to really deliver on this record. We couldn't sell anything short, and we had to give it all 110%." Both the album's opening track "Still Alive" and its closing track "Aftermath" proclaim the band's triumph over tragedy, though not all the songs bear overt references to the bus collision. Bassist Jim Riley said the album "isn't about what happened to us. We don't get lost in that one day. This is about our journey, our growth, and who we are." Unlike The Ghost Inside's earlier albums, which aim to "take the listener on a journey from dark to light", the band chose to theme different songs on specific emotions, without necessarily focusing on a positive aspect at all in a given song. Unlike most of the band's lyrics, "Pressure Point" notably uses profanity. The band generally avoids featuring it in their songs, but Riley stated that "sometimes you’re just so fed up that nothing less than a big loud fuck will get the job done".

The production process began with two weeks of demo recordings at McKinnon's and Andrew Wade's studio, The Audio Compound, in Orlando, Florida, during May 2019. The band took a break for their July comeback show, and then finished the album at Graphic Nature Audio in Belleville, New Jersey, in February 2020. All five members were present in the studio while recording The Ghost Inside, unlike the band's previous records, for which each member had recorded their parts individually. The decision to self-title the album came when no other suitable suggestions could be found. Vigil explained that the original intent was to choose a title which accurately summarized the events the band members had gone through in the previous five years, but nothing they thought of was satisfactory. The album's cover artwork is a collage of images of fans' tattoos dedicated to the band.

== Release and promotion ==
The Ghost Inside announced details of their upcoming album, as well as the first single "Aftermath" and its music video, on April 22, 2020. The band chose "Aftermath", as the album's opening single because it "allows anyone that listens into our world, but it also lets us put final punctuation on that chapter of our lives". The music video for "Aftermath" opens with footage of the 2015 tour bus crash before showing Vigil performing at what appears to be the site of the accident, interspersed with images of Tkaczyk recovering from his injuries. The album's second single "Pressure Point" was released on May 12; according to Riley, the band "embraced being pissed off and let it pour out through some of the most aggressive and pointed lyrics we've ever had".

The Ghost Inside was released on June 5, 2020; the band chose to keep to the original release date despite the COVID-19 pandemic. According to Riley:

We don't know when things are going to go back to normal, so if we just sit here and wait for things to go back to normal, we could be sitting on this record for six months or a year. And what do we have to lose? Life is gonna be fucked up enough.

The day of the album's release, Rashod Jackson of Bracewar accused Riley of using a racial slur against a tour bus driver. Viewing the controversy as a threat to the band's comeback, the Ghost Inside announced they had parted ways with Riley the next day. By September, the other band members expressed regret over his dismissal; when the band was able to tour Europe again after pandemic restrictions were lifted, Riley was playing with the band again.

== Reception ==
=== Critical reception ===
Professional ratings
Aggregate scores
Source	Rating
Metacritic	85/100
Review scores
Source	Rating
Allmusic	4/5 stars
Dead Press!	9/10 stars
Exclaim!	9/10
Kerrang!	4/5
NME	4/5 stars
Punknews.org	4.5/5 stars

The Ghost Inside was met with a positive response from music critics. At Metacritic, which assigns a normalized rating out of 100 to reviews from mainstream critics, The Ghost Inside has an average score of 85 based on four reviews, which indicates "universal acclaim".

Many critics considered the record to be a return to form for the band; Paul Travers of Kerrang! reacted positively to the album sounding just as it would have had it not been for the band's inactivity following the accident. James Christopher Monger of Allmusic said that it was "both invigorating and unsurprising when Vigil bellows 'TGI from the ashes, brought back to life' just seconds into the brief but punishing '1333'". Despite most of the album displaying the band's own brand of metalcore and hardcore, Monger also noted post-metal influence in "Unseen", which he praised as "a late-summer storm before unleashing a blackened torrent that evokes August Burns Red by way of Agalloch". Furthermore, he noted "Aftermath" similarly experimented with these sounds, but ultimately shared more in common with their core style. Dannii Leivers of NME wrote; "we aren't here for a reinvention; we're here for a rebirth", and called The Ghost Inside "a towering statement of positivity" emerging from the band's hardship. Owen Morawitz of Exclaim! said the album "proves that the band are back to operating at their creative peak", delivering what he judged as their strongest material.

The album was additionally considered a triumph of the metalcore genre; according to Sam Houlden of Punknews.org, "whereas most [metalcore] bands excel in one area, TGI have managed to raise all aspects of their game to an equally impressive level and the result is something endlessly listenable", drawing comparisons to Counterparts, Stray From the Path, Knocked Loose and McKinnon's band, A Day To Remember. Putney's and McKinnon's production was also praised; Zach Buggy of Dead Press! said Putney's work "lend[s] itself perfectly to everything from the crushing, mammoth breakdowns, to the shimmering, melodious hardcore the group have made their own". Morawitz noted that while the band stayed true to their earlier roots as intended on "Pressure Point" and "Overexposure", tracks such as "Make or Break", "Begin Again" and "Aftermath" evidently drew from McKinnon's input and experience with A Day to Remember. The latter three tracks, by contrast to the former two, bore "sharper songwriting and catchier hooks".

=== Commercial performance and accolades ===
The Ghost Inside had a strong showing on American rock charts. In the US, the album spent one week on the U.S. Billboard 200, coming in at number 141. It also appeared on the US Top Rock Albums and Top Hard Rock Albums charts, peaking at numbers 14 and four, respectively. In Europe, The Ghost Inside peaked at number six in Germany, number 25 in Austria, number 37 in Switzerland, number 51 in Belgium, and number 52 in Scotland. Outside of the US and Europe, the album also appeared on the Australian ARIA Charts at number five.

The Ghost Inside was included on Loudwire's list of "The 70 Best Rock and Metal Albums of 2020"; reviewer Graham Hartmann said the band "proved they could walk the walk with their self-titled album, giving fans a blueprint to navigate through their own trauma".

== Track listing ==
All tracks are written by The Ghost Inside.

The Ghost Inside track listing
No.	Title	Length
1.	"1333"	0:59
2.	"Still Alive"	3:29
3.	"The Outcast"	3:05
4.	"Pressure Point"	3:50
5.	"Overexposure"	3:52
6.	"Make or Break"	3:22
7.	"Unseen"	4:35
8.	"One Choice"	3:26
9.	"Phoenix Rise"	4:01
10.	"Begin Again"	3:27
11.	"Aftermath"	4:58
Total length:		39:11

== Charts ==
Chart performance for The Ghost Inside
Chart (2020)	Peak position
Australian Albums (ARIA)	5
Austrian Albums (Ö3 Austria)	25
Belgian Albums (Ultratop Flanders)	51
German Albums (Offizielle Top 100)	6
Scottish Albums (Official Charts)	52
Swiss Albums (Schweizer Hitparade)	37
US Billboard 200	141
US Top Rock Albums	14
US Hard Rock Albums	4

== Personnel ==
The Ghost Inside

- Jonathan Vigil – lead vocals
- Zach Johnson – lead guitar, backing vocals
- Andrew Tkaczyk – drums, percussion
- Chris Davis – rhythm guitar, backing vocals
- Jim Riley – bass, backing vocals

Production

- Will Putney – producer, engineer, mixing, mastering
- Jeremy McKinnon – producer
- Steve Seid – engineer
- Andrew Wade – engineer
- Matt Guglielmo – assistant
- Geo Hewitt – assistant

Information adapted from The Ghost Inside liner notes.
