= The Machines We Are =

2009 studio album by Dead and Divine

Studio album by Dead and Divine
- Released: August 4, 2009
- Recorded: 2009
- Genre: Post-hardcore
- Length: 40:06
- Label: Distort Entertainment
- Producer: Eric Ratz and Garth Richardson

Dead and Divine chronology
| The Fanciful (2008) | The Machines We Are (2009) | Antimacy (2011) |

Professional ratings
Review scores
| Source | Rating |
|---|---|
| Rock Sound | link |

The Machines We Are is the second full-length studio album released by Dead and Divine. It was released on August 4, 2009. The video for "Neon Jesus" was released in September 2009.

== Track listing ==
1. "The Sugar Sickness" - 3:49
2. "Creature" - 4:10
3. "Chemical Valley" - 2:43
4. "Neon Jesus" - 3:13
5. "D.R.U.G.S." - 2:44
6. "For Your Health" - 1:36
7. "Teeth" - 3:40
8. "Mechanical Orchestra" (featuring Blake Prince of Straight Reads the Line) - 3:28
9. "Lovely Bones" - 5:22
10. "Cassandra Syndrome" - 9:21

== Personnel ==
- Vocals: Matt Tobin
- Guitars: Chris Le-Masters
- Drums: Kyle Anderson
- Bass: Kellan Lindsay
- Produced by Eric Ratz & Garth Richardson
- Engineered and Mixed by Eric Ratz
- Editor: Dajaun Martineau
- Tech: Alan "Yeti" Riches
- Layout and design by Sons of Nero
