= The Blood Stays on the Blade =

EP by Your Demise
- Released: May 12, 2008
- Recorded: The Homestead in Southampton, England
- Length: 26:04
- Label: Thirty Days of Night
- Producer: Peter Miles

Your Demise chronology
Your Days are Numbered (2005)	The Blood Stays on the Blade (2008)	Ignorance Never Dies (2009)

The Blood Stays on the Blade, released on May 12, 2008 through Thirty Days of Night Records, is the second EP and third release from the St Albans-based hardcore punk band Your Demise. It is the follow-up to their debut full-length You Only Make Us Stronger.

== Track listing ==
No.	Title	Length
1.	"Too Little Too Late"	1:58
2.	"No Half Measures"	2:30
3.	"The Blood Stays on the Blade"	2:59
4.	"Bitterness Will Prevail"	2:11
5.	"Unbound by Blood"	2:25
6.	"Burning Ashes"	14:01
Total length:		26:04
