= The Kids We Used to Be... =

2010 studio album by Your Demise

Studio album by Your Demise
- Released: 20 September 2010
- Genre: Melodic hardcore, hardcore punk
- Length: 38:22
- Label: Visible Noise
- Producer: John Mitchell

Your Demise chronology
Ignorance Never Dies (2009)	The Kids We Used to Be... (2010)	The Golden Age (2012)

Professional ratings
Review scores
Source	Rating
Alternative Press	4/5 stars
AbsolutePunk	80%
Rock Sound	9/10

The Kids We Used to Be... is the third full-length studio album by British hardcore punk band Your Demise. It is the first to feature new vocalist Ed McRae, following the departure of George Noble in 2009. The album was released on 20 September 2010 in the UK and Europe via Visible Noise.

== Track listing ==
No.	Title	Length
1.	"MMX"	1:55
2.	"Miles Away"	3:23
3.	"Scared of the Light"	3:46
4.	"Life of Luxury" (feat. Mike Duce of Lower Than Atlantis)	3:37
5.	"Teenage Lust"	4:27
6.	"The Kids We Used to Be..."	3:40
7.	"Get the Fuck Out of Little Rock"	1:07
8.	"Like a Broken Record"	4:31
9.	"Shine On" (feat. Mike Hranica of The Devil Wears Prada)	4:00
10.	"Give Up, Get Dropped, Lose Out"	3:20
11.	"XO"	4:12
Total length:		37:58

== Personnel ==
Your Demise

- Ed McRae – vocals
- Stuart Paice – guitar
- Daniel Osborne – guitar
- James Sampson – bass
- James Tailby – drums

Guest appearances

- Mike Duce of Lower Than Atlantis – vocals on "Life of Luxury"
- Mike Hranica of The Devil Wears Prada – vocals on "Shine On"
