= Night Verses =

American post-rock band

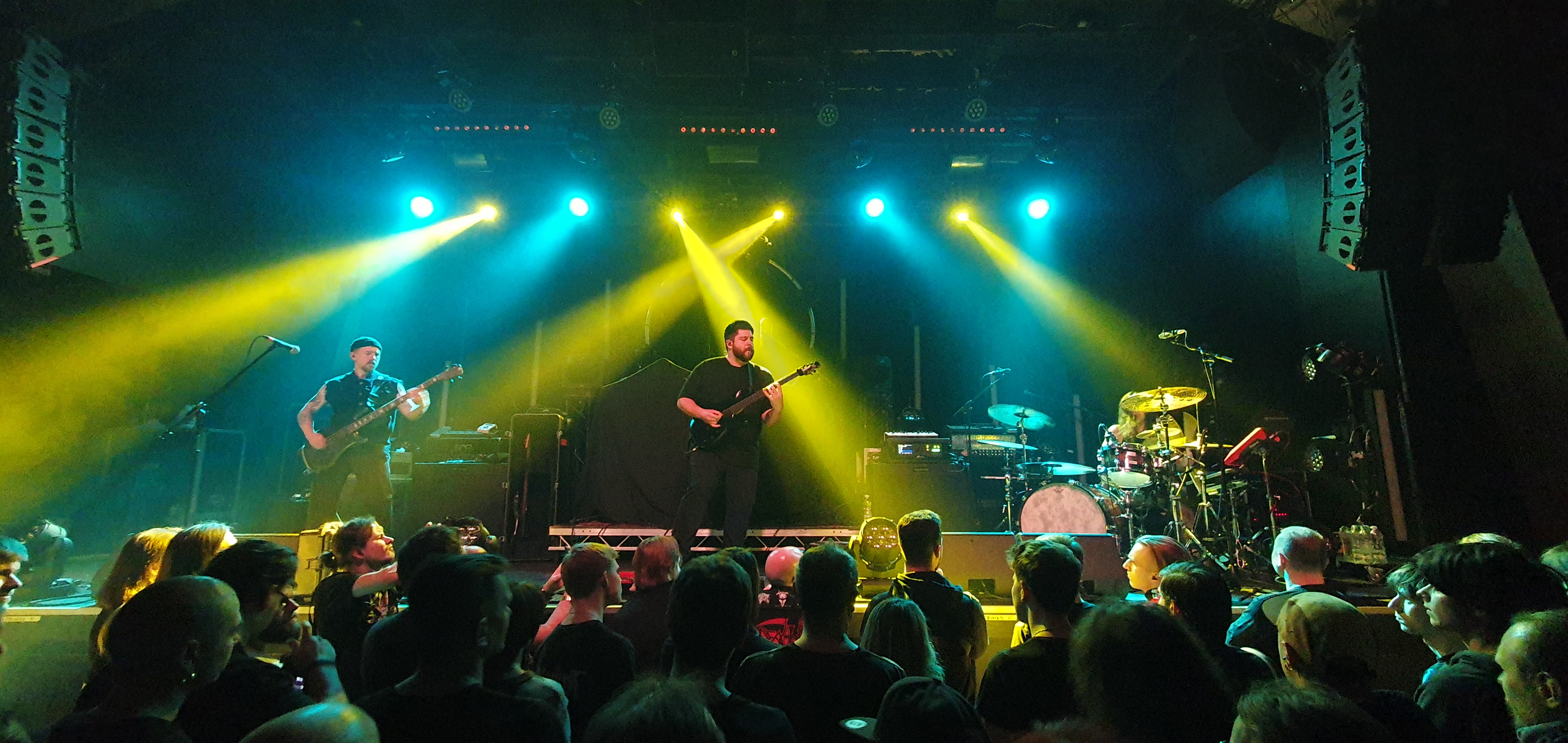
- Night Verses performing in Prague, 2025

Background information
- Origin: Los Angeles, California, United States
- Genres: Alternative metal, post-hardcore, metalcore, space rock, art rock, shoegaze
- Years active: 2012–present
- Labels: Graphic Nature/Equal Vision Records, Easy Killer Records (formerly), Southworld
- Members: Nick DePirro; Reilly Herrera; Aric Improta
- Past members: Douglas Robinson
- Website: nightverses.com

Night Verses is an American rock band from Fullerton, California. The group consists of guitarist Nick DePirro, bassist Reilly Herrera, and drummer Aric Improta. The band has four releases to date and is currently signed to Graphic Nature/Equal Vision Records (US).

== History ==
=== Formation ===
Night Verses was formed in Los Angeles in 2012. Early that year, Douglas Robinson (lead vocalist of the Sleeping) was attending a local charity show that was being put on by a close friend. One of the bands to play that night was Fullerton based Post-Rock act known as the Sound Archives. DePirro, Herrera, and Improta had been writing and performing together 10 years prior under different band names, this just happened to be their most recent instrumental endeavor following the departure of former singer Marco Lira. Robinson was so impressed with their performance, that he approached the band immediately after the show and displayed interest in being a vocal addition to the group. After a single practice session the same night, the band knew the addition felt right and began working with Robinson on demos which would soon result in the material used on the Out of the Sky EP.

=== Out of the Sky EP ===
Soon after formation, the group recorded the Out of the Sky EP with producer Kris Crummet at Interlaced Audio in Portland, Oregon. The EP was self released on May 25, 2012, and contained 4 tracks which added up to just under 19 min in length. It was self-released on the band's website (www.nightverses.com), free for public download for the rest of the year. The EP was well received by critics and won EP of the year on Punktastic's Reader awards. This release was followed immediately by a headlining UK tour with Flood of Red as main support and a spot on the main stage at Hevy Fest 2012. Throughout this time, the band was working on material for their soon to be recorded debut album Lift Your Existence. In an interview with Criticalwave.co.uk, the band stated that they had written around 50 songs for the album and were in the process of narrowing them down to the very best.

=== Lift Your Existence ===
On January 5, 2013, the band headed back to Interlace Audio to record their debut full length with Kris Crummett. The album was titled Lift Your Existence and released on June 25, 2013, via Easy Killer (US) and July 22, 2013, on Southworld (UK) records. The album received critical acclaim both nationally and internationally, and was considered an early album of the year contender on multiple sites and magazines.

Liam Spencer of Daily Dischord stated, "Never have a band so early in their existence managed to compile such a spectacular piece of work as that which is found on this album. With such a wide array of emotions put on a pedestal and decorated with such beautiful musical craftsmanship, you’ll be hard pushed to find another record in 2013 that seizes your attention quite like this."

=== Into the Vanishing Light ===
On September 10, 2015, Night Verses announced signing to Equal Vision/Graphic Nature Records and that they had begun recording their second LP with Ross Robinson (Slipknot, At the Drive-In, Norma Jean). The band stated in the press release, "The new album will put an emphasis on a presenting a fuller, darker ambience than our previous releases, with more effects, live electronics, experimentation and an overall massive sound."

On May 27, 2016, the band confirmed that the title of their second album would be 'Into the Vanishing Light', and it would be released on July 8, 2016. This was also accompanied with a full stream of the first single from the record, 'A Dialogue In Cataplexy'.

On September 5, 2017, the band announced the departure of vocalist Douglas Robinson.

=== From the Gallery of Sleep ===
On January 19, 2018, Night Verses dropped a 3-song preview of their upcoming full length via Equal Vision Records. The release was titled Copper Wasp EP in reference to the first of the 3 songs, however the band stressed that it was strictly a preview of the album and not to be considered a separate "EP" release like Out of the Sky was.

In an interview with New Noise Magazine, Nick stated "With this new record, it was a goal of ours to fill up as much sound as possible between 3 people, while still actually pulling it all off live. Not just technically speaking, but atmospherically as well[...]" He later added "We wanted the songs to be reminiscent of dream sequences." In reference to LP3.

On May 31, the band released their first single "Phoenix IV: Levitation" for their upcoming record From the Gallery of Sleep. The album was released on June 29, 2018.

=== Every Sound Has a Color in the Valley of Night ===
On August 18, 2023, Night Verses announced the release of their fifth album, titled Every Sound Has a Color in the Valley of Night. It was released across two separate volumes, with the first seven tracks (as "Every Sound Has a Color in the Valley of Night: Part 1") out September 15 on Equal Vision Records. The album was released on March 15, 2024, when, alongside the first seven songs, the remaining seven tracks were released, making the full album a 14-track record. The album was recorded at Graphic Nature Audio studios in Belleville, New Jersey.

On August 22, 2025, the band released an EP titled "Live Sessions, Vol. 1". The EP contains four tracks, including a session recorded in Nashville, Tennessee with Meinl Cymbals, and a reimagined version of the song "Harmonic Sleep Engine" from 2018 album "From the Gallery of Sleep".

== Musical style and influences ==
Night Verses have been noted for their vast use of guitar effects, intricate rhythm section and introspective/emotive vocals. Their consistent layering of effected textures and diverse rhythmic choices lean them more toward the genres like space rock, art rock, and even some shoegaze. However, their more-aggressive passages and emotionally-driven vocals often create similar moments to those found within the alternative metal, post-hardcore, and metalcore genres.

In multiple interviews the band has referenced Tool, Isis, Fiona Apple, At the Drive-In, Opeth, Björk, Deftones, DJ Shadow, Nirvana, Rage Against the Machine, various trip hop artists, and the film Beyond the Black Rainbow as influences that have had a heavy impact on their sound.

== Other projects ==
The Drum Chain was a video collaboration project released via the band's YouTube channel. They created a single composition featuring 9 different drummers. According to an article posted by Modern Drummer, each drummer was asked to record 16 bars of 4/4 over 140 BPM. The band then put the rhythmic compositions together and wrote music over the top of the piece to make it feel like one song. The drummers involved (aside from Aric) were: Billy Rymer (The Dillinger Escape Plan), Anup Sastry (formerly of Intervals and Monuments), Mike Ieradi (Protest the Hero), Alex Bent (Ex-Trivium/ Ex-Battlecross), Garrett Henritz (formerly of Fol Chen and HRVRD), Loniel Robinson (Letlive), Joseph Arrington (A Lot Like Birds), Mathew Lynch (Foregin Air/Trioscapes).

Aric Improta was also a member of Fever 333, a politically charged rock band featuring Jason Aalon Butler formerly of Letlive and Stephen Harrison formerly of the Chariot. The group has also had collaborative association with Travis Barker and John Feldmann. He also occasionally performs live with Goldfinger, he's recorded drums on the last 2 Gin Wigmore records and has participated in multiple Drum Festivals around the world. Meinl Cymbals released a studio re-recording of his 40 min solo performed at Meinl Drum Festival in Gutenstetten, Germany on July 1, 2017, via their YouTube channel. The piece is entitled Blur-Lights in the Videodrome. In 2024, Improta started a new band with former band-mate Stephen Harrison, named House of Protection.

Reilly Herrera is co-owner, designer and creator of Learn to Forget clothing and has performed live on bass with both Letlive and HRVRD. He also is the graphic designer for Night Verses, and for other artists such as Machine Gun Kelly, Weezer, Deftones, Lil Durk, The Smashing Pumpkins, Elvis and others.

Nick DePirro has released various solo records that can be found at nickdepirro.bandcamp.com and has posts new clips often via his Instagram. Nick has also performed guitar live with Letlive and Norma Jean. DePirro is also part of a metalcore supergroup headcave, which features Nick Giumenti (My Ticket Home) and Tanner Wayne (In Flames) on vocals and drums, respectively.

== Band members ==
=== Current ===
- Nick DePirro - guitars
- Reilly Herrera - bass
- Aric Improta - drums, percussion

=== Former ===
- Douglas Robinson - vocals

== Discography ==
=== Studio albums ===
- Lift Your Existence (2013)
- Into the Vanishing Light (2016)
- From the Gallery of Sleep (2018)
- Every Sound Has a Color in the Valley of Night (2024) (the first seven tracks were released on August 18, 2023, as a semi-independent "Part 1" cut of the full album)

=== EPs ===
- Out of the Sky (2012)
- Live Sessions, Vol. 1 (2025)
