= Searching for Solace =

2024 album by The Ghost Inside

Studio album by the Ghost Inside
- Released: April 19, 2024
- Recorded: 2023
- Genre: Metalcore; melodic hardcore
- Length: 37:15
- Label: Epitaph
- Producer: Dan Braunstein

The Ghost Inside chronology
The Ghost Inside (2020)	Searching for Solace (2024)

Singles from Searching for Solace
- 1. "Earn It" Released: July 10, 2023; 2. "Death Grip" Released: November 7, 2023; 3. "Wash It Away" Released: February 5, 2024; 4. "Split" Released: March 19, 2024

Professional ratings
Review scores
Source	Rating
Kerrang!	4/5

Searching for Solace is the sixth album by American metalcore band The Ghost Inside. The album was released digitally on April 19, 2024, through Epitaph Records, with a physical release scheduled for June 7.

== Background and production ==
Searching for Solace was produced by Dan Braunstein (Spiritbox, Dayseeker), Cody Quistad (Wage War), Carson Slovak and Grant McFarland (August Burns Red, Bloodywood). This marked the first album by The Ghost Inside with more than one producer. Bassist Jim Riley explained, "It was neat to go to a person like Dan Braunstein who has known the band for 15 years and have him go, 'I love what you guys have been doing and this is what I see as the next step', or to get in a room with someone like Cody from Wage War and have him be like, 'I love your band. I wish you guys would do something like this.' To go into writing a song with those guys from that place was ...it was really cool. It was really liberating. And I think it also just added to the range that this record has."

The tracks in the album lyrically deal with COVID-induced isolation, "grief, loss and the gut-wrenching sadness that comes with losing someone close to you." The song "Cityscapes" was written in memory of vocalist Jonathan Vigil's father who died during the band's Australian tour in 2012. Vigil stated, "It's about the day that I lost my father and it just so happened to be in Australia. I remember looking outside my hotel window at the Brisbane skyline, the cityscape of Brisbane, just in tears, not knowing what to do and feeling so lost."

== Release and promotion ==
The Ghost Inside began releasing their first new material in three years, with the album's first single "Earn It", released on July 10, 2023. The album's second single "Death Grip" was released on November 7.

On February 5, 2024, the band released the third single "Wash It Away" and announced details of Searching for Solace including its release date of April 19. The album's final pre-release single, "Split" was released on March 19, 2024.

In support of the album, the band has embarked on tour through the U.S. from April to May 2024, with bands Paleface Swiss, Bleed from Within and Great American Ghost. The Ghost Inside have also planned a European tour scheduled for October and November. They have also been announced alongside bands State Champs and The Blackout to perform with various other bands at Slam Dunk Festival on May 25 and 26.

== Track listing ==
All tracks are written by The Ghost Inside.

The Ghost Inside track listing
No.	Title	Length
1.	"Going Under"	3:30
2.	"Death Grip"	3:00
3.	"Light Years"	3:24
4.	"Secret"	3:07
5.	"Split"	3:11
6.	"Wash It Away"	3:34
7.	"Cityscapes"	3:29
8.	"Earn It"	3:06
9.	"Wrath"	3:34
10.	"Reckoning"	3:47
11.	"Breathless"	3:33
Total length:		37:15

== Personnel ==
The Ghost Inside

- Jonathan Vigil – lead vocals
- Zach Johnson – lead guitar, backing vocals
- Andrew Tkaczyk – drums, percussion
- Chris Davis – rhythm guitar, backing vocals
- Jim Riley – bass, backing vocals

Technical

- Dan Braunstein – production, engineering
- Ted Jensen – mastering
- Zakk Cervini – mixing
- Jesse Field – engineering, editing
- Cody Quistad – co-production on "Light Years" and "Split"
- Tyler Smyth – co-production on "Earn It"
- Jon Eberhard – additional production on "Earn It"

Visuals

- Jim Hughes – cover art
- Jason Link – layout

== Charts ==
Chart performance for Searching for Solace
Chart (2024)	Peak position
German Albums (Offizielle Top 100)	57
UK Rock & Metal Albums (OCC)	37
