= Ignorance Never Dies =

Studio album by Your Demise
- Released: April 20, 2009
- Recorded: 2009
- Genre: Hardcore punk
- Length: 43:22
- Label: Earache, Visible Noise

Your Demise chronology
The Blood Stays on the Blade (2008)	Ignorance Never Dies (2009)	The Kids We Used to Be... (2010)

Professional ratings
Review scores
Source	Rating
Allmusic	4/5 stars
Blabbermouth	8/10
Kerrang!	4/5 stars
Rock Sound	9/10

Ignorance Never Dies is the second full-length studio album from UK hardcore punk band Your Demise.

The album was released on 20 April 2009, in UK & Europe via Visible Noise Records, followed by a promotional tour of Europe with Deez Nuts and More Than Life.

== Track listing ==
No.	Title	Length
1.	"Ignorance Never Dies"	2:13
2.	"Burnt Tongues"	2:55
3.	"Nothing Left But Regret"	2:17
4.	"Antipode"	3:06
5.	"Hypochondriac" (Interlude)	1:06
6.	"Dreaming of Believing"	2:00
7.	"TF"	3:13
8.	"Unknown Dub" (Interlude) (Produced by Culprate))	5:07
9.	"The Clocks Aren't Ticking Backwards"	3:34
10.	"Feels Like There's Something Dark Inside"	4:46
11.	"All I Never Want to Be" (featuring Sam Carter of Architects)	2:17
12.	"Great Shape" (Interlude)	3:19
13.	"Black Veins"	4:25
14.	"Blood Ran Cold"	3:04
Total length:		43:22

== Personnel ==
=== Your Demise ===
- George Noble – vocals
- Stuart Paice – guitar
- Daniel Osborne – guitar
- James Sampson – bass
- James Tailby – drums

=== Additional personnel ===
- Marc Aspinal – art conception, design, layout
- Tom Barnes – photography
- Ben Humphreys – engineering
