= Cream City (album) =

Studio album by Aalon
- Released: 1977
- Recorded: 1977 at Far Out Studios, Hollywood, California; Sound City, Panorama City, California
- Genre: Rock; R&B; disco
- Length: 43:12
- Label: Arista Records
- Producer: Jerry Goldstein

Aalon chronology
Cream City (1977)	Brand New Flave (2006)

Professional ratings
Review scores
Source	Rating
Allmusic	4.5/5 stars

Cream City is the debut album by American funk/soul band Aalon. Released in 1977 and produced by Jerry Goldstein, the album reached number 45 on the R&B albums chart in the US. The group disbanded shortly after the album's release. It was reissued on CD by Thump Records in the mid-1990s, and the album has had a cult following ever since.

== Track listing ==
1. Cream City - (Aalon Butler, Jerry Goldstein) 3:25
2. Rock and Roll Gangster - (Aalon Butler) 5:25
3. Midnight Man - (Aalon Butler) 4:41
4. Summer Love - (Aalon Butler) 5:01
5. Steven Baine's Electric Train - (Aalon Butler, Jerry Goldstein) 4:04
6. Lonely Princess - (Aalon Butler) 5:47
7. Magic Night - (Aalon Butler, Jerry Goldstein) 7:20
8. Jungle Desire - (Aalon Butler, Juan Luis Cabaza) 7:27

== Personnel ==
Aalon

- Aalon Butler — guitars, lead and backing vocals
- Luis Cabaza — keyboards
- Luther Rabb — bass
- Ron Hammond – drums

Additional personnel

- Al Roberts — bass
- Alvin Taylor – drums
- Barbara Benney, Freddy Pool, Paula Bellamy — backing vocals on "Cream City"

== Charts ==
Chart (1977)	Peak position
Billboard Top Soul LPs	45

=== Singles ===
Year	Single	Chart positions
Year	Single	US R&B
1977	"Cream City"	44
