= Letlive =

American rock band

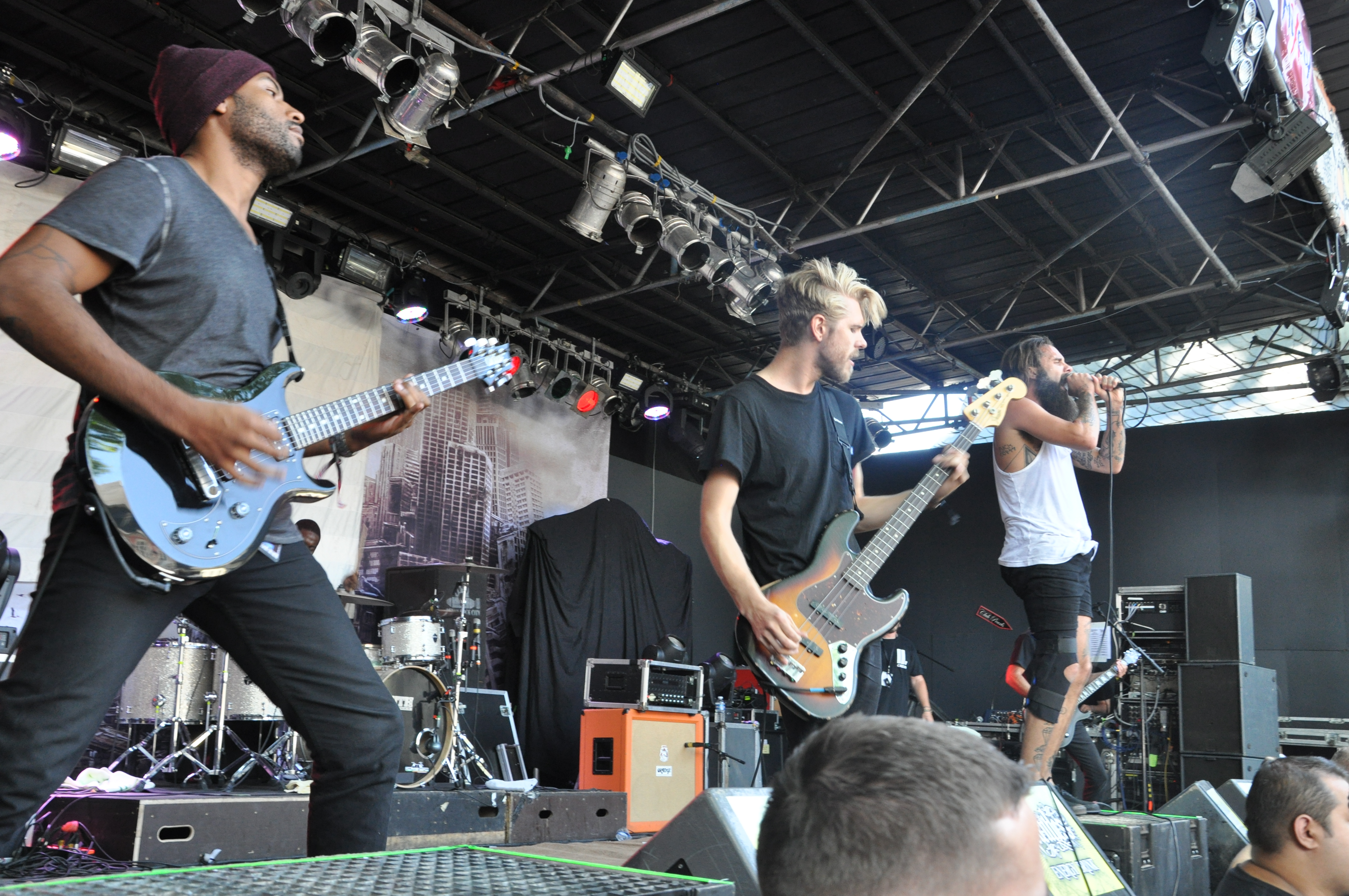
- Letlive performing at 2014's Summerblast Festival in Trier, Germany. (L–R: Jean Nascimento, Ryan Johnson, Jason Butler. Obscured: Loniel Robinson, Jeff Sahyoun)

Background information
- Origin: Los Angeles, California, U.S.
- Genres: Post-hardcore; art punk; experimental rock; metalcore
- Years active: 2002–2017; 2024–present
- Labels: At One; Tragic Hero; Epitaph
- Spinoffs: Fever 333
- Members: Jason Aalon Butler; Jean Francisco Nascimento; Jeff Sahyoun
- Past members: Ryan Jay Johnson; Loniel Robinson; Keeyan Majdi; Alex Haythorn; Christian Johansen; Ben Sharp; Craig Sanchez; Adam Castle; Omid Majdi; Brenden Russel; Anthony Paul Rivera

Letlive, stylized letlive., is an American rock band from Los Angeles. The band's final lineup consisted of lead vocalist Jason Aalon Butler (son of Aalon Butler, vocalist, and guitarist of the soul group Aalon), guitarist Jeff Sahyoun, bassist Ryan Jay Johnson and drummer Loniel Robinson. Butler was the band's only constant member. The band has released four full-length albums and one EP, with their final album If I'm the Devil being released on June 10, 2016. They were last signed to Epitaph Records.

Letlive released their first EP Exhaustion, Salt Water, and Everything in Between in 2003 and their first LP Speak Like You Talk in 2005. Their second album, Fake History was released in 2010. Upon its re-release on Epitaph in 2011, the album received critical praise and was also added to Rock Sound's 101 Modern Classics. Their third album, entitled The Blackest Beautiful was released on July 9, 2013 and on June 17, was streamed on Epitaph's YouTube channel. On April 28, 2017, the band announced via social media that they had broken up. In 2024, however, Butler announced plans to revive the band to end it on better terms.

== Biography ==
=== Early years (2002–2009) ===
Letlive was formed in Los Angeles in 2002 by vocalist Jason Aalon Butler, drummer Alex Haythorn, guitarist Ben Sharp and bassist Christian Johansen. In 2003, the band's debut EP Exhaustion, Salt Water, and Everything in Between was released on at One Records. After a line-up change (with only Butler and Sharp remaining), their first album Speak Like You Talk was released in 2005, also on at One Records. Bassist Ryan Jay Johnson joined the band before the release, but did not perform on the album. In 2007, Ben Sharp left the band and the band was plagued by subsequent line-up changes and a scrapped album.

=== Fake History (2009–2013) ===
After establishing a first stable lineup with guitarists Jean Nascimento and Ryan Johnson, and drummer Anthony Rivera accompanying Butler and Johnson, letlive. toured extensively throughout the US and Canada, and gained momentum. The band signed with Tragic Hero Records in 2009 and released their second album titled Fake History the next year. The band continued touring and after signing with Epitaph Records in February 2011, undertook a brief European tour. They were signed to Epitaph after Bring Me the Horizon frontman Oliver Sykes contacted label owner Brett Gurewitz after watching them perform at a single gig in 2008.

Epitaph re-released Fake History in April 2011 with three additional tracks, including two B-sides and one new song produced by Brett Gurewitz. The re-release has been the subject of several favorable reviews from AllMusic, Alternative Press, the BBC and Rock Sound. Starting in June 2011, the band undertook more extensive touring, including appearances at Download Festival and Leeds Festival, supporting Enter Shikari and Your Demise on their mainland European tour, and, in the United States, supporting Underoath and August Burns Red. In February 2012, letlive. toured again with Enter Shikari and Your Demise for their first time around Australia as a part of the 2012 Soundwave Festival. Butler also featured on track Tangled in the Great Escape from Pierce the Veil's album Collide with the Sky.

In October 2012, the band announced they had parted ways with drummer Anthony Rivera.

=== The Blackest Beautiful and If I'm the Devil... (2013–2017) ===
On June 4, the single "Banshee (Ghost Fame)" was released. On June 17, the full album was streamed on the Rock Sound website, three weeks before the scheduled release. The Blackest Beautiful was released on July 9, 2013 to positive critical reception. The writing process surfaced many creative tensions amongst the band members, about which Butler stated, "We set the bar high and everything needed to be approved by everybody else. Eventually we had to become very transparent with each other and just say 'look, I just don't like this' or 'this isn't working for me.'". In an interview with Fuse, released on July 16, it was confirmed that Loniel Robinson, their touring drummer, as well as drum tech for Of Mice & Men, would become a permanent member. The album debuted in the United States at number 74 on the Billboard 200 and number six on Hard Rock Albums, selling nearly five thousand copies. In the United Kingdom, the album debuted at number 62. A music video for the song "Younger" was released on September 26, 2013. On January 23, letlive. revealed that they would be releasing "renditions" of songs from The Blackest Beautiful, featuring various artists on remade versions of the songs. The first "rendition" released was a new version of "27 Club", featuring Keith Buckley of Every Time I Die. On April 23, their second "rendition" released was a new version of "The Dope Beat", featuring Dan "Soupy" Campbell of The Wonder Years.

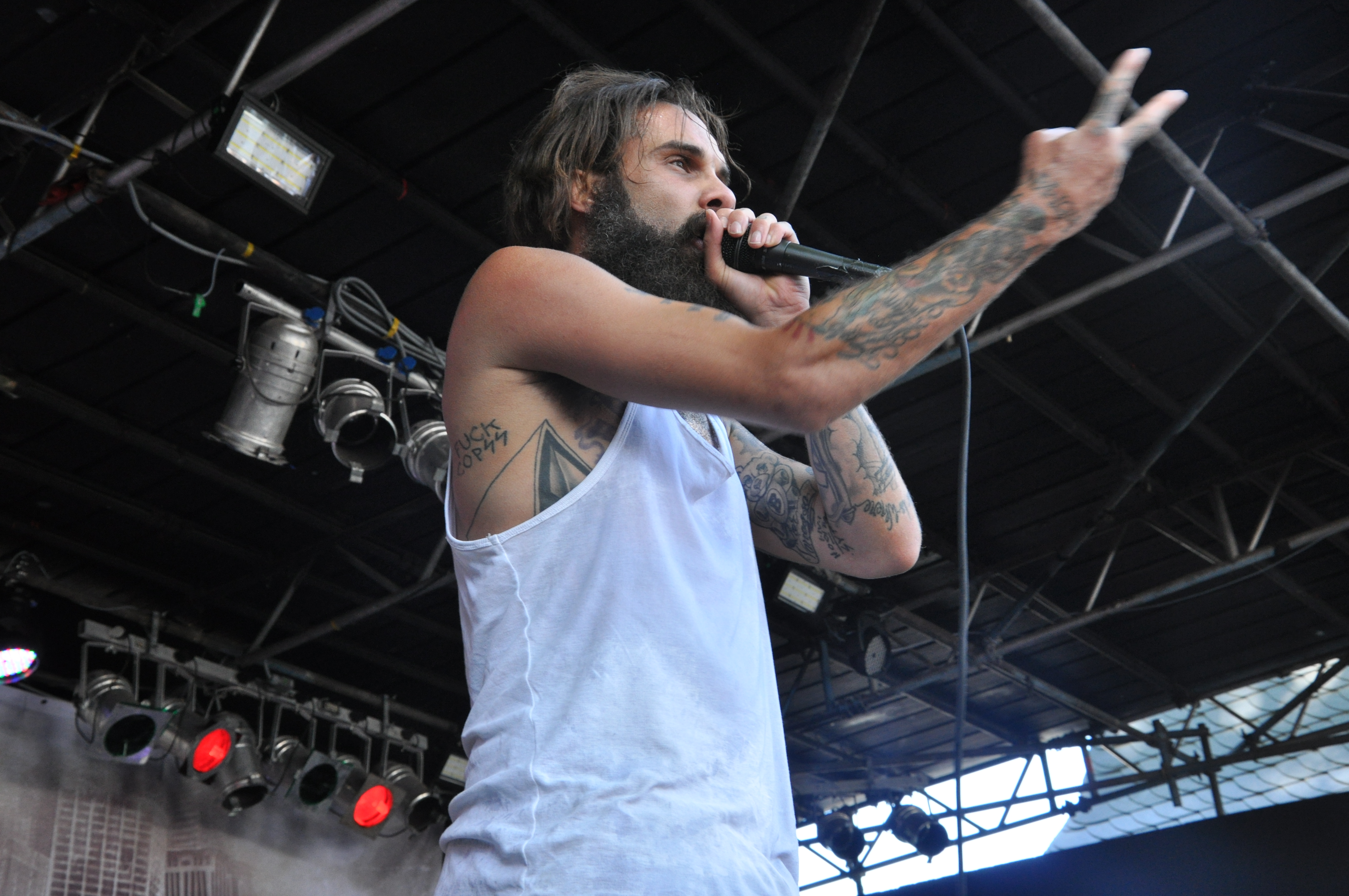
Lead vocalist Jason Butler performing at 2014's Summerblast Festival

On February 10, 2015, Jean Nascimento left the band for unknown reasons. In light of his departure, Kenji Chan, former live guitarist for Bruno Mars and former member of Ryan and Jeff's previous band, Best Interest, acted as the band's touring guitarist.

On September 25, 2015, the band posted a tweet confirming that they had completed their fourth album and that it would be released in 2016. On the same day, they also confirmed that further additions to their 'Renditions' project/album would be put on hold to focus on new music. On November 3, 2015, in a Revolver Magazine online article, letlive. disclosed that their fourth studio album would be entitled If I'm the Devil....

=== Split (2017) ===
On April 28, 2017, the band announced that after 15 years together as a band, "there will be no further activity for the foreseeable future".

In June and July 2017, Butler, former The Chariot guitarist Stephen "Stevis" Harrison, and Night Verses drummer Aric Improta began teasing a new project called The Fever 333 (later shortened to Fever 333). The band performed their first show together out of the back of U-Haul truck in the parking lot of Randy's Donuts in Inglewood, California.

=== Fake History 10th anniversary (2020) ===
On April 13, 2020, the band started using their Instagram account again and teased fans with a 10th anniversary release of Fake History complete with unreleased songs and demos.

=== The Blackest Beautiful 11th anniversary and "sincerely yours," farewell tour (2024-2025) ===
On April 17, 2024, the band posted an announcement of the remix and remaster of The Blackest Beautiful and announced they will be performing a farewell tour in 2025. "To our friends that we never got to say goodbye to: we'll see you next year to do so," the statement read. "We'd like suitable spaces around the world for proper farewells." In October 2024, the band announced the first show of their farewell tour as part of the 2025 When We Were Young line-up.

On February 12, 2025, the band confirmed reunion shows will take place in several dates in the US, UK, Europe and Australia throughout 2025 as part of a tour called "sincerely yours,". They also unveiled the reunion line-up, which would consist of Butler and returning guitarists Jean Francisco Nascimento and Jeff Sahyoun. The live line-up would be completed by touring musicians Sage Webber of Point North on drums, and former Issues member Skyler Acord on bass.

== Musical style ==
letlive.'s musical style has been described as post-hardcore as well as experimental rock, art punk and metalcore. Remfry Dedman, writing for The Independent, described letlive.'s sound as "harnessing the severe, frenetic power of Black Flag and marrying it to the melodic, infectious soul of Michael Jackson" In a 2011 interview with Rock Sound, frontman Jason Butler stated that they "want to show people American punk rock soul is very much well and alive". Typical aspects of the band's music include Butler's emotive vocal delivery, duelling guitars and introspective lyrics that cover topics such as infidelity, culture, greed and corruption.

== Members ==
Current members

- Jason Aalon Butler – lead vocals (2002–2017, 2024–present)
- Jean Francisco Nascimento – lead guitar, keyboards, auxiliary percussion, backing vocals (2009–2014, 2024–present), rhythm guitar (2007–2009)
- Jeff Sahyoun – rhythm guitar, backing vocals (2009–2017, 2024–present), lead guitar, keyboards, auxiliary percussion (2014–2017)

Current touring musicians

- Ryan Seaman– drums (2025–present)
- Skyler Acord – bass (2025–present)

Former members

- Keeyan Majdi – rhythm guitar (2002–2003)
- Alex Haythorn – drums, percussion (2002–2004)
- Christian Johansen – bass (2002–2005)
- Ben Sharp – lead guitar (2002–2007)
- Craig Sanchez – rhythm guitar (2003–2005)
- Adam Castle – drums, percussion (2004–2007)
- Omid Majdi – rhythm guitar (2005–2007)
- Ryan Jay Johnson – bass, backing vocals (2005–2017)
- Brenden Russel – lead guitar (2007–2009)
- Anthony Paul Rivera – drums, percussion (2007–2012)
- Loniel Robinson – drums, percussion (2013–2017)

Former touring musicians

- Aric Improta – drums, percussion (2012–2013)
- Kenji Chan – guitar, backing vocals (2015)
- Nick DePirro – guitar (2015–2016)
- Mishka Bier – guitar (2016–2017)

Former studio musicians

- Chelsea Warlick – additional vocals (on Fake History)
- Christopher Crandall – drums, percussion (on The Blackest Beautiful)

Timeline

== Discography ==
Studio albums

- Speak Like You Talk (2005)
- Fake History (2010)
- The Blackest Beautiful (2013)
- If I'm the Devil... (2016)

== Tours ==
=== Supporting ===
- 2015 Rise Against North American Summer Tour With Killswitch Engage: The tour begins in Chicago, IL at the FirstMerit Bank Pavilion at Northerly Island on July 17 & is scheduled to wrap with a concert in Denver, CO at the Fillmore Auditorium on August 16.
