= Your Demise =

British hardcore punk band

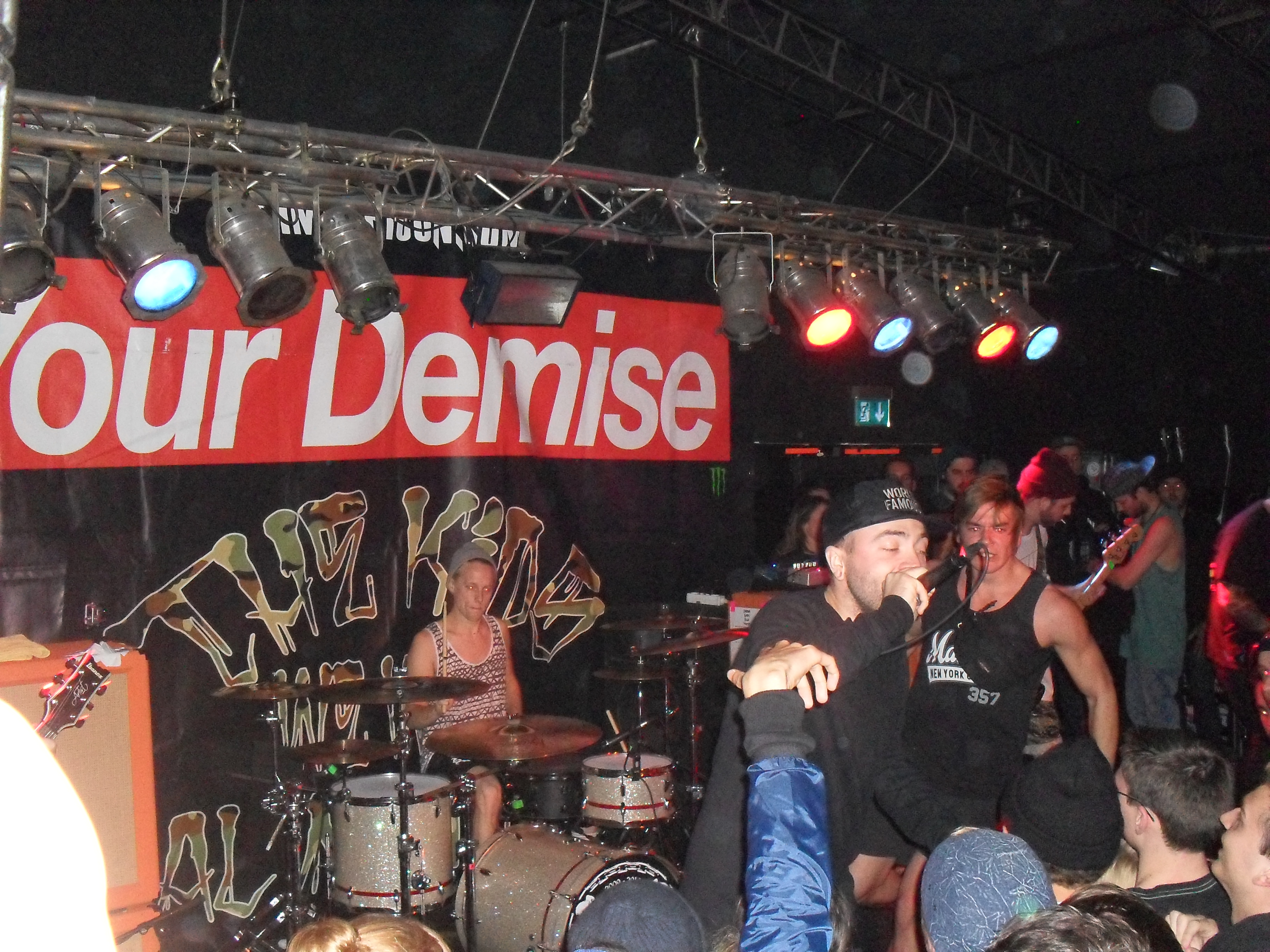
- Your Demise performing in Cologne in October 2013 as part of their Farewell Tour

Background information
- Origin: St Albans, England
- Genres: Hardcore punk, melodic hardcore
- Years active: 2003–2014, 2015; 2020–2022, 2025
- Labels: Pinky Swear Records, Visible Noise, Rise, Distort, Shock, Earache, Thirty Days of Night
- Members: George Noble; Dan Moss; Guy Smith; Jon Farley
- Past members: George Noble; Stuart Paice; Andreas Yiasoumi; Sam Brown; Daniel Osbourne; Rob Kiff; Ashley Davison; Lee Barrett; James Tailby; Ed McRae; James Sampson and others

Your Demise is a British hardcore punk band from St Albans, England, formed in 2004. They shared stages and toured worldwide with the likes of Comeback Kid, Basement, Trapped Under Ice, Man Overboard, Enter Shikari, Parkway Drive, A Day to Remember and Bring Me the Horizon. On 22 September 2008, the band confirmed that they had signed a deal with Visible Noise. The band played their final gig at The London Underworld on 15 March 2014, after announcing in 2013 that they would be parting ways in March. They reunited for a one-off benefit show for The Ghost Inside in 2015. They reunited again for the anniversary of The Kids We Used to Be, but the shows were postponed due to the COVID-19 situation. The original singer (George Noble) continues the band under the name Your Demise 2004.

== History ==
The band was formed in 2004 with them playing shows at the horn & St Albans youth club, The Pioneer Club. Various demos and EPs were recorded and handed out for free over the next couple of years until You Only Make Us Stronger was recorded and self-released by the band on Mind Rugby Records. This was followed by The Blood Stays on the Blade, released by Thirty Days of Night Records in 2008.

They cited influences including Awoken, Madball, Agnostic Front, Sick of It All, No Warning, Terror, Strife, Earth Crisis, Hatebreed, Until The End, Floorpunch, Champion, Ten Yard Fight, Black My Heart, Special Move and Mind Rugby

Your Demise recorded their Visible Noise debut between 16 November 2008 and 13 January 2009 at Outhouse Studios in Reading, England. The band released their second album Ignorance Never Dies in April 2009. The band embarked on a 3-week tour of Europe and the UK, starting 20 April 2009, with Deez Nuts, More Than Life and Lower Than Atlantis. The band then signed with Earache Records in North America, and with Shock Records in Australia.

Since the release of Ignorance Never Dies, the band split from vocalist George Noble and recruited former Centurion frontman Ed McRae. Shortly afterward, Your Demise toured the UK and Europe with Misery Signals in August and September 2009 and then continued to tour Scandinavia with Raised Fist in early October, followed by a European run with The Devil Wears Prada.

The band finished recording their third album on 16 June 2010. It was released on 20 September in the UK, Japan and Europe. In the U.S. it was released on 25 October. The album is called The Kids We Used to Be and they showcased some of the new songs at Download Festival 2010 and have been playing them on tour since.

On 6 September 2011 the band announced via Facebook that their fourth album will be called The Golden Age. On 4 January 2012, the release date was confirmed as 26 March 2012, along with details of guest vocalists.

On 7 February, the band released their new EP Cold Chillin', a 4 track follow up to The Golden Age, and their first release since parting ways with Visible Noise. Karma was the lead single, which was released as a free download and a video was made for it. The EP was released on CD via Impericon and a hand-numbered 7" through Pinky Swear Records limited to 500 copies over two colourways and alternative artworks.

On 15 April 2013, the band announced, via a YouTube video posted to their Facebook/Twitter page, that they were to break up. The decision was amicable and based on the fact that they felt they had taken the band as far as they believed was possible. The band will "come to an end in March 2014, following a series of farewell performances (details of which will be announced in the near future)." The band also announced that they would no longer be able to perform their scheduled dates in Mexico, North America and Canada. On 14 March 2014, the band started a two night farewell show at Camden Underworld, London, ending with a set on 15 March 2014.

On 30 April 2014, it was announced that original vocalist George Noble was reforming a line-up of the band to tour, and they will be performing songs from the first two albums and all demos and EPs, under the name of 'Your Demise 2004'.

In 2019, the band announced a reunion show to be played on 5 April 2020 at Camden Underworld for the 10 year anniversary of The Kids We Used To Be, along with a series of appearances at Impericon Festivals in Europe and Slam Dunk Festivals. Due to the ongoing COVID-19 pandemic, the UK shows were delayed numerous times until September 2021. The band went on to support Sheffield metal band Malevolence at Oxford O2 Academy on 11 November. Your Demise announced a series of UK shows in April 2022 as their "last headline shows for the foreseeable future". The shows took place in Southampton, Sheffield and London. Your Demise played their final show on Friday 24 June at Outbreak Festival.

== Members ==
Final lineup

- Stuart "Stu" Paice – guitar, backing vocals (2005–2014, 2015; 2020–2022)
- Daniel "Ozzy" Osbourne – guitar (2006–2014, 2015; 2020–2022)
- James "Jimmy" Sampson – bass, backing vocals (2008–2014, 2015; 2020–2022)
- James "Tailbee" Tailby – drums (2008–2014, 2015; 2020–2022)
- Ed "Dippy" McRae – lead vocals (2009–2014, 2015; 2020–2022)

Former members

- Robert Kiff – vocals (2003–2004)
- George Noble – guitar (2003–2004), vocals (2004–2009)
- Lee Barratt – drums (2003–2005)
- Ashley Davison – drums (2003–2005)
- George Dixon – drums (2003–2008)
- Roland Farrar – vocals (2004–2005)
- Robin "Pills" Davies – bass (2004–2005)
- Oliver Wolffe – drums (2005)
- Andreas Yasoumi – guitar (2005–2006)
- Sam Brown – bass (2005–2006)
- Nathan Liddle – bass (2006–2007)
- Stuart Mackay – drums (2008)

Timeline

== Discography ==
Studio albums

- You Only Make Us Stronger (2006, Zone 6 Records)
- Ignorance Never Dies (2009, Visible Noise Records)
- The Kids We Used to Be... (2010, Visible Noise Records)
- The Golden Age (2012, Visible Noise Records)

EPs

- The Blood Stays on the Blade (2008, Thirty Days of Night Records)
- Three For Free (2012, self-released)
- Cold Chillin' (2013, Pinky Swear Records)

Demos

- First Strike (2005, self-released)
- Your Days Are Numbered (2005, self-released)

== Videography ==
- "The Blood Stays on the Blade" (2008)
- "Burnt Tongues" (2009)
- "Miles Away" (2010)
- "The Kids We Used to Be..." (2011)
- "Life of Luxury (feat. Mike Duce of Lower Than Atlantis)" (2011)
- "Forget About Me" (2012)
- "These Lights" (2012)
- "Push Me Under" (2012)
- "Karma" (2013)
- "A Song to No One" (2013)
