= Fake History =

Studio album by Letlive
- Released: April 13, 2010
- Recorded: Charlotte, North Carolina; August–September 2009
- Genre: Post-hardcore; art punk; alternative metal; metalcore
- Length: 44:58 (Original release); 56:22 (2011 re-release)
- Label: Tragic Hero (2010); Epitaph (2011 re-release)
- Producer: Letlive; Kit Walters; Brett Gurewitz

Letlive chronology
Speak Like You Talk (2005)	Fake History (2010)	The Blackest Beautiful (2013)

Fake History is the second studio album by American rock band Letlive and the first written and recorded with Jason Aalon Butler (vocals), Jean Nascimento (guitar), Jeff Sahyoun (guitar), Ryan Jay Johnson (bass guitar) and Anthony Rivera (drums). Originally released on Tragic Hero Records in April 2010, it was re-released by Epitaph Records April 12, 2011, with three additional tracks.

Lyrically, the band didn't write the album with a particular political stand point and wanted the album to stimulate political, emotional and intellectual awareness. Upon its re-release on Epitaph, the album received favorable reviews, generating an aggregated score of 76/100. British publication Rock Sound added Fake History into their 101 Modern Classics.

On April 13, 2020, the tenth anniversary of the album's original release, the band released a collection of demos for tracks that were eventually worked and finalised to feature on the album.

== Critical reception ==
Professional ratings
Aggregate scores
Source	Rating
Metacritic	76/100
Review scores
Source	Rating
AllMusic	3.5/5 stars
Alternative Press	4.5/5 stars
BBC Music	(very positive)
Blare Magazine	4.5/5 stars
PopMatters	9/10 stars
Rock Sound	9/10 stars
Sputnikmusic	4.5/5 stars
Thrash Hits	4/6 stars

Fake History received generally positive reviews from music critics. At Metacritic, which assigns a normalized rating out of 100 to reviews from mainstream critics, the album received an average score of 76, based on 8 reviews, which indicates "generally favorable reviews". Sputnikmusic gave Fake History a 4.5 out of 5 or "superb" rating, calling it "a post-hardcore album fit for many of 2010's best-of lists". Rock Sound magazine called it "a frenetic, hugely entertaining and inventive genre mash-up". Thrash Hits gave the album a 4 out of 6 rating, calling it "a good album but it smacks of a band struggling hard to fit their entire repertoire into one record".

In 2012, British publication Rock Sound added letlive.'s album Fake History into their 101 Modern Classics placed at number 51. They considered the album more of a classic than Queens of the Stone Age's Songs for the Deaf and Alkaline Trio's Good Mourning. Stating that "The essence of hardcore distilled by five LA lifers, ‘Fake History’ is at once a howl of vulnerability and a fuck-you-you-will-never-break-me clarion call of utter defiance. Truly, genuinely thrilling."

== Track listing ==
All tracks are written by letlive.

No.	Title	Length
1.	"Le Prologue"	1:45
2.	"The Sick, Sick, 6.8 Billion"	3:12
3.	"Renegade 86'"	3:35
4.	"Enemies [Enemigos]"	4:56
5.	"Casino Columbus"	3:58
6.	"Muther" (feat. Chelsea Warlick)	5:40
7.	"Homeless Jazz"	3:41
8.	"We, the Pros of Con"	4:13
9.	"H. Ledger"	3:36
10.	"Over Being Under"	3:37
11.	"Day 54"	6:45
Total length:		44:58

Re-release bonus tracks
No.	Title	Length
12.	"Hollywood, and She Did"	4:00
13.	"Lemon Party"	3:59
14.	"This Mime [A Sex Symbol]"	3:25
Total length:		56:22

== Personnel ==
- Jason Aalon Alexander Butler – lead vocals
- Ryan Jay Johnson – bass guitar
- Jean Francisco Nascimento – guitar, keyboards
- Jeff Sahyoun – guitar, backing vocals
- Anthony Rivera – drums, percussion

Production

- Kit Walters – engineer, producer
