= Dead and Divine =

Canadian post-hardcore band

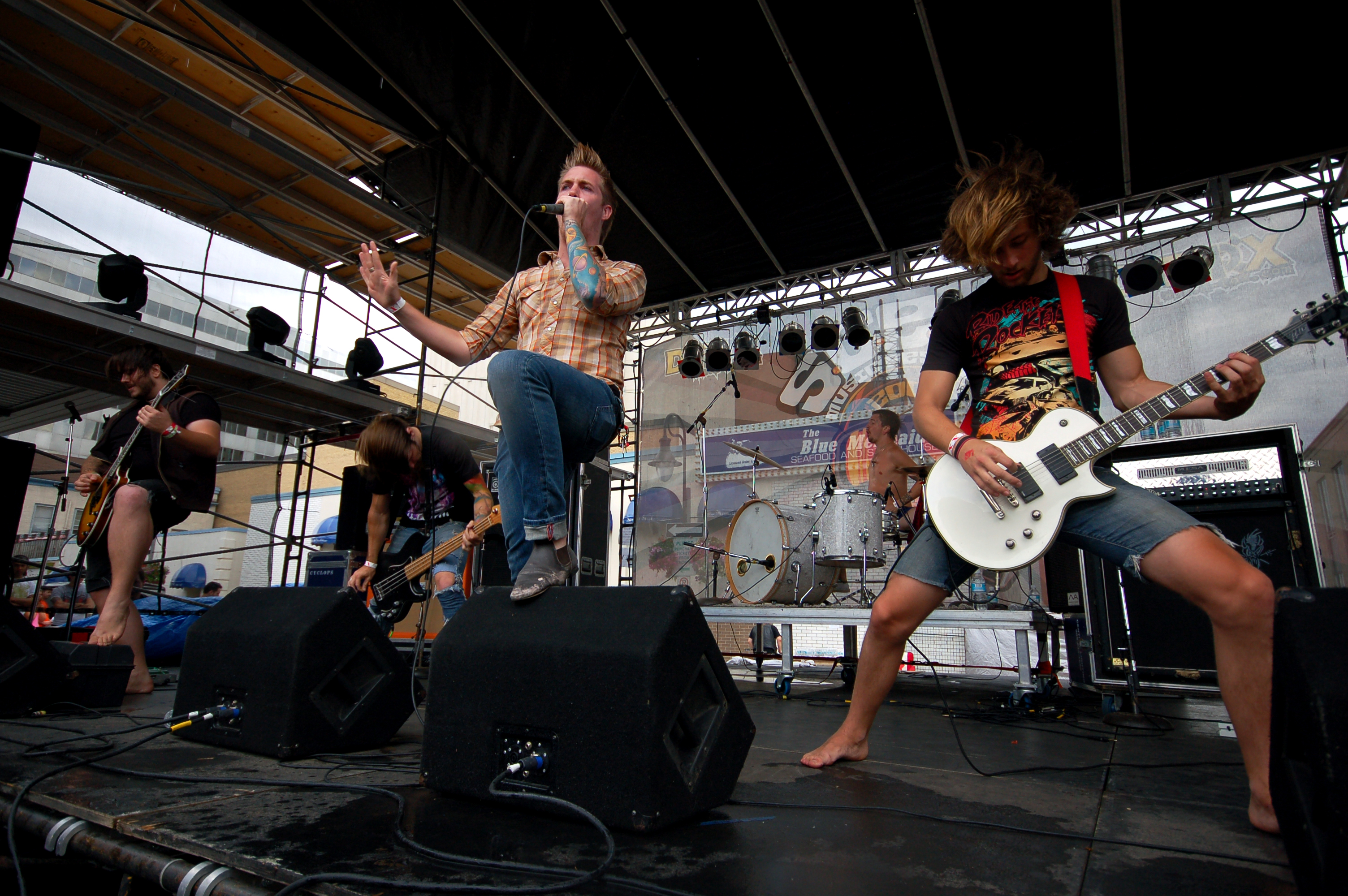
- Dead and divine live in 2008.

Background information
- Origin: Burlington, Ontario
- Genres: Post-hardcore; metalcore
- Years active: 2003–2012
- Labels: Distort, Rise, Verona
- Past members: Matt Tobin; Chris LeMasters; Kellan Lindsay; Sebastien Lueth; Kelly Bilan; Pat Simms; Dave McGuire; Isi Commisso; Will Allen; Kyle Anderson
- Website: Dead & Divine official MySpace page

Dead and Divine was a Canadian post-hardcore band from Burlington, Ontario. Their initial success spawned from their 2005 EP What really happened at Lover's Lane on Verona Records (a label created by the band themselves, and Silverstein's Shane Told).

== History ==
Their first EP, What really happened at Lover's Lane sold nearly 1000 copies nationwide, landing them a spot on the Canadian Billboard chart. The band then set off on an independently booked coast to coast Canadian headlining tour that following summer, playing in as many cities as they could.

They spent most of December 2007 recording their Rise Records debut-album, The Fanciful, at Interlace Studios with producer Kris Krummet. They shot a music video for "Like Wolves" with director Ben Knechtel. In July 2008, it was announced that Ryan Leger would leave the band in order to be with his girlfriend and newborn daughter. The band found a replacement - Kyle Anderson. Leger later joined Every Time I die. The band toured Canada and the US supporting The Fanciful for close to two years with bands like Farewell to Freeway, Inhale Exhale, Oceano, Darkest Hour, Oh, Sleeper, Cancer Bats, Arise and Ruin, and Emarosa.

In September 2008, the band signed with Distort Entertainment. The band then released The Machines we are on August 4 and embarked on a Canadian tour with Straight reads the Line. They again broke into the Billboard Canada and No. 18 on the Canadian Nielsen SoundScan Hard Rock Charts, as well as landing No. 39 on the Canadian Nielsen SoundScan Alternative Charts. The band was nominated for Favorite Punk/Hardcore Group at the CMW Indie Awards. In August 2009, they shot a video for "Neon Jesus" with director Marc Ricciardelli, which was released on September 18, 2009.

Their third album, Antimacy, released on August 11, 2011, debuted at No. 53 on the Canadian Albums Chart.

On April 22, 2012, the band announced that they would be breaking up after one last hometown show in Burlington, Ontario. They cited a hectic touring schedule and a need to focus on personal lives as their reason for splitting. However Tobin says that incessant fighting and disagreements between the band lead to their demise.

=== Aftermath ===
On April 14, 2014, vocalist Matt Tobin formed a new band by the name of "Ritual".

On November 4, 2019, guitarist Chris LeMasters launched a new project called Teeth with ex-members of Every Time I Die, Norma Jean, and Straight Reads the Line.

== Band members ==
Former

- Matt Tobin – vocals
- Chris LeMasters – guitar
- Kellan Lindsay – bass guitar
- Sebastian Lueth – guitar
- Kelly Bilan – drums
- Pat Simms – guitar (2003–2006)
- Dave McGuire – guitar
- Isi Commisso – bass (2003–2006)
- Will Allen – drums (2003–2007)
- Kyle Anderson – drums

== Discography ==
Studio albums

- The Fanciful (March 18, 2008)
- The Machines We Are (August 4, 2009)
- Antimacy (August 2, 2011)

EPs

- Her Name Was Tragedy (2004)
- What Really Happened at Lover's Lane (2005)

=== Videography ===
- "Like Wolves"
- "Neon Jesus"
- "Asphyxia Fiend"
