= Get What You Give =

Studio album by The Ghost Inside
- Released: June 19, 2012
- Recorded: The Wade Studio, Ocala, Florida
- Genres: Metalcore; melodic hardcore; srscore
- Length: 37:15
- Label: Epitaph
- Producer: Jeremy McKinnon

The Ghost Inside chronology
| Returners (2010) | Get What You Give (2012) | Dear Youth (2014) |

Get What You Give is the third studio album by metalcore band The Ghost Inside, released on June 19, 2012. It is dedicated, in the inner CD case, to the memory of Ryan Vigil, brother of vocalist Jonathan Vigil.

Get What You Give checked in at No. 3 on Australian hardcore radio station, short.fast.loud's, Best Album of 2012 listener poll, behind Australian artists Parkway Drive and The Amity Affliction.

The video for the single, "Engine 45", was released on June 5, 2012.

The album artwork features Rundle Mountain in Banff National Park, Canada.

== Track listing ==
| No. | Title | Length |
|---|---|---|
| 1. | "This Is What I Know About Sacrifice" | 1:29 |
| 2. | "Outlive" | 2:36 |
| 3. | "Engine 45" | 4:12 |
| 4. | "Slipping Away" | 3:13 |
| 5. | "The Great Unknown" | 3:11 |
| 6. | "Dark Horse" | 3:21 |
| 7. | "White Light" | 4:50 |
| 8. | "Thirty Three" | 3:07 |
| 9. | "Face Value" (featuring Andrew Neufeld of Comeback Kid) | 3:51 |
| 10. | "Deceiver" | 3:07 |
| 11. | "Test the Limits" | 4:18 |
| Total length: | | 37:15 |

== Personnel ==
Personnel per album liner notes.

The Ghost Inside

- Jonathan Vigil – lead vocals
- Aaron Brooks – lead guitar, backing vocals
- Jim Riley – bass, backing vocals
- Zach Johnson – rhythm guitar
- Andrew Tkaczyk – drums

Additional musicians

- Jeremy McKinnon – background vocals
- James SK Wān – bamboo flute

Production

- Produced by Jeremy McKinnon
- Engineered by Andrew Wade, @ The Wade Studio, Ocala, Florida
- Mixed by Pete Rutcho, Southbridge, Massachusetts
- Mixing assistant: Shane Frisby
- Mastered by Alan Douches, @ West West Side, New York, NY
- Album art & design by Nick Pritchard

== Charts ==
| Chart (2012) | Peak position |
|---|---|
| UK Rock & Metal Albums (Official Charts) | 26 |
| US Billboard 200 | 88 |
| US Independent Albums (Billboard) | 19 |
| US Top Hard Rock Albums (Billboard) | 8 |
| US Top Rock Albums (Billboard) | 37 |
