= If I'm the Devil... =

Studio album by Letlive
- Released: June 10, 2016
- Recorded: 2014–2015; Los Angeles, California
- Genre: Post-hardcore; art punk; experimental rock; indie rock; alternative rock
- Length: 44:41
- Label: Epitaph
- Producer: Letlive; Justyn Pilbrow

Letlive chronology
The Blackest Beautiful (2013)	If I'm the Devil... (2016)

Singles from If I'm the Devil...
- 1. "Good Mourning, America" Released: April 5, 2016; 2. "Reluctantly Dead" Released: May 9, 2016

If I'm the Devil... is the fourth and final studio album by American rock band Letlive, released globally through Epitaph Records on June 10, 2016. Recorded throughout 2015, it is their first album since the departure of guitarist and percussionist Jean Nascimento, who had been a member of the band from 2007 to 2014.

== Background ==
On September 25, 2015, the band posted a tweet confirming that they had completed their fourth album and that it would be released in 2016. On the same day, they also confirmed that further additions to their 'Renditions' project/album would be put on hold temporarily in order to focus on the new album.

On November 3, 2015, in a Revolver magazine online article, letlive. disclosed that their fourth studio album would be entitled If I'm the Devil....

The album was officially announced on April 6, 2016, on which day the album's artwork, track listing and release date were revealed. Pre-orders for the album became available on iTunes and Google Play shortly after. The first single from the album, "Good Mourning, America" was also released on the same day.

== Writing and recording ==
In an interview with Rock Sound, lead vocalist Jason Aalon Butler commented on record's sound, stating "it's a Letlive record, so obviously there's always going to be an element of aggression and rock 'n' roll present, but there is a lot of new stuff going on musically. There are elements of new wave, as well as some really dark hip-hop and soul influences, and even some indie references. We've always mixed things up and experimented, and this record is no different."

Writing the album proved to be difficult for the band members, who engaged in conflict over musical differences. Jason Aalon Butler, in an interview with Revolver Magazine, stated that "we got into a bunch of arguments when we were writing this record. Some of us wanted to do our punk songs and some of us wanted to do our more rock songs. Me, I wanted to do some shit that sounded like Kanye [West] meets Royal Blood or something. But then we started to let go and just said, 'Fuck it, let's write the song and see how we feel about it when it's done.'" These musical differences resulted in an album that was "like a more advanced version of the sort of rock and soul approach that we've been trying to follow. We finally got to really explore using all these other instruments and sounds in our music - there are acoustic elements, there are electronic elements like Radiohead or A Tribe Called Quest might have used, there’s things like the sound of us slapping desks and walls... we just tried everything". Butler also commented on the vocals he had tracked for the album, stating that "I'm singing a lot more than I'm screaming - which I'm very excited about because it's something I've wanted to do for the past few years."

Lyrically, the album is described as being "easily the most politically and socially-minded record [we've] done." The track "Reluctantly Dead" has a particular focus on authority figures that abuse their power. Butler stated that "in the song, I put myself in the eyes and the heart of that type of person and I try to understand that they're still human at their core. I think if I can realize that these people are human beings, too, then maybe I can work toward creating some sort of change." The chorus of opening song I've Learned To Love Myself contains the line "I've learned to love myself, I've learned to love my self-abandonment" which is reference to the track Younger from the band's last album where a similar line can be found in the bridge.

== Track listing ==
No.	Title	Length
1.	"I've Learned to Love Myself"	4:57
2.	"Nü Romantics"	3:35
3.	"Good Mourning, America"	4:45
4.	"Who You Are Not"	4:12
5.	"A Weak Ago"	3:11
6.	"Foreign Cab Rides"	4:34
7.	"Reluctantly Dead"	4:35
8.	"Elephant"	2:40
9.	"Another Offensive Song"	2:59
10.	"If I'm the Devil..."	5:01
11.	"Copper Colored Quiet"	4:12
Total length:		44:41

== Personnel ==
letlive.

- Jason Aalon Butler – lead vocals
- Ryan Jay Johnson – bass, backing vocals
- Jeff Sahyoun – guitars, keyboard, backing vocals
- Loniel Robinson – drums, percussion

Production

- Justyn Pilbrow - Production
- Dan Korneff - Mixing, Mastering

== Charts ==
Chart (2016)	Peak position
Australian Albums (ARIA)	18
German Albums (Offizielle Top 100)	70
New Zealand Heatseekers Albums (RMNZ)	9
UK Albums (OCC)	97
