= The Blackest Beautiful =

Studio album by Letlive
- Released: July 9, 2013
- Recorded: June 2012 – January 2013
- Studios: Suburban Soul (Los Angeles, California)
- Genre: Post-hardcore
- Length: 45:36
- Label: Epitaph
- Producers: Kit Walters; Letlive; Stephen George

Letlive chronology
Fake History (2010)	The Blackest Beautiful (2013)	If I'm the Devil... (2016)

Singles from The Blackest Beautiful
- 1. "Banshee (Ghost Fame)" Released: June 4, 2013; 2. "Younger" Released: September 25, 2013

The Blackest Beautiful is the third studio album by American rock band Letlive. It was released by Epitaph Records on July 9, 2013. Recorded between June 2012 and January 2013, the album used four drum sessions, and went through ten recording engineers before settling on Stephen George. The drums were recorded with session musician Christopher Crandall, in the absence of the band having a permanent drummer at the time. The album incorporated a variety of music styles based on its members, including punk rock, funk, and soul; it was mastered and mixed to have a "more human" and "organic" sound.

Although the album was not expected to sell well because it was streamed for free prior to release, it still debuted in the United States at number 74 on the Billboard 200 and number six on the Hard Rock Albums chart, with nearly five thousand copies sold. The band toured the United Kingdom and Ireland to support the album, and joined other bands on tours across the United States. Critics welcomed the album, praising its crisp production and forward-thinking sound within post-hardcore, with Metacritic giving an aggregate rating of "universal acclaim".

== Background ==
Jason Aalon Butler, the band's front-man and remaining founding member, described the group's first releases, extended play Exhaustion, Saltwater, And Everything In Between (2004) and debut album Speak Like You Talk (2005), as "educational experiences" in writing whole songs rather than "cool bits" for songs. Music journalist Andrew Kelham wrote that the era these "raw hardcore punk" records were produced in was plagued by "potential [that] was never realised as an ever-revolving door of musicians cause the band to limp through Jason's late teens and early twenties." With the second album, Fake History, the band felt they found their "signature sound". In 2008, when performing as a substitute opening support band for Bring Me the Horizon's show in Los Angeles, they caught the attention of Brett Gurewitz, owner of Epitaph Records, who later signed the band and re-released their second album in 2011.

== Recording and production ==
I ask only a couple of things of the engineer, like I ask them not to be there or I'll ask if we can turn the lights off, because it is a very raw, vulnerable state that it puts me in and I'm still human and I'm still very much concerned about my image in that sense sometimes, because I was taught that vulnerability was not allowed, that it was something that would actually hurt you, beyond just being sad, vulnerability was certainly condemned.

— Singer Jason Aalon Butler in an interview with The Independent.

In 2010, Letlive began writing on the third album. Butler said that their writing approach changed in comparison to their previous releases, as they were now doing most of it while on tour. During pre-production, the band listened to styles and ideas that, according to Butler, changed the way they looked at the songs they had initially written. The styles were their most expansive to date, and came from the diversity of their members: Butler had involved himself in the punk rock skateboarding culture when he was eleven, but had also been influenced by his father, who was in a soul band.

When they began recording in studio in June 2012, the band's members felt little pressure to complete the album as they could deliver something similar to their previous album "if you've delivered once already, why would it be a problem to do it again? We are the band that made those records [...] so there's really no problem in that regard." Guitarist Jeff Sahyoun said he did not even think back on Fake History when they were producing The Blackest Beautiful. However, as they progressed through it, there were elements that were not clicking, and the performances lacked the same bite in comparison to their Fake History demos. Butler said that this "almost sent the band crazy". He said he required a specific environment when he sings as his performance puts him in a vulnerable state.

During a tour where they supported Underoath in October, they brought their studio equipment with them, which allowed them to record on the road. Butler said "It was like we'd have a pop up studio in a bathroom in South Florida or in the woods off the highway in Wyoming." In December, the band felt they were done with recordings; Butler said "there was absolutely nothing left to try", and walked away from the project. The band had recorded the drums on four occasions. They finished recording at a static studio in January 2013.

Although there was increasing demand from fans, the band took their time with mixing and producing. Butler said the pressure was more rooted in giving the fans an album they deserve rather than meeting the expectations of the band. He said it was "one of the hardest processes I've endured as a human being, not just as an artist, but ever." Because Fake History was perceived by fans as sounding overproduced, the band strove for an "organic and authentic" sound that was "very human" and that reflected the sound of their live performances. They took "an analogue route", where they used the test mix of the album as it "spoke to them" in its raw energy. After going through ten sound engineers, they went with Stephen George, whom Sahyoun said "just added little diamonds and made it pop", so the album sonically reminded them of their influences.

During the recording sessions, drummer Anthony Rivera left the band. Butler said the departure was an "amicable split": "sometimes you simply need more than what the artist lifestyle gives you, and that's fine". Chris Crandall replaced Rivera for the studio sessions, and Loniel Robinson, a drum tech from the band Of Mice and Men replaced Crandall following the album release.

== Artwork and packaging ==
When the band was creating the album art, they intended to create something provocative and captivating and so they experimented with how "black and white American flags could represent "a much bigger idea of the sterilization that we are experiencing." The title is a play on the saying "Black is beautiful" and how it acts as an opposition to everything that society is saying otherwise.

== Composition ==
=== Music ===
That Fear Fever
Track five, 'That Fear Fever' was described as combining "slick beats", scat singing and a doom metal-inspired middle section.

Younger
The single 'Younger', the album's seventh track, highlight letlive's "staggering dynamics, brain-burrowing melodies and intelligent production tricks.

The Blackest Beautiful was described as a post-hardcore record, much like its predecessors, from "screaming rage to tight, sophisticated harmonies to frenzied funky riffing to emotively melodic parts". Mike Diver of Clash considered it a pop record with clear, melodic structure, while others grouped it with punk rock, soul, and funk, as well as displaying 'glimpses' of other music styles including Afrobeat, electronica and jazz. The incorporation of funk music has been noted by critics. Stephen Hill described the album as "find[ing] the space between DC Hardcore and Stax funk". James McMahon described the album as being "dragged through the civil rights movement, through 80s New York block parties, through the birth of hip-hop, funk, jazz and soul." Terry Bezer in Front found that the album has 'as much in common with funk as punk' and wrote in Metal Hammer that the album features 'the musical dexterity and reckless abandon of razor-edged funk'. Letlive's ferocity and use of dynamics have led critics to draw comparisons to rock bands Glassjaw, At the Drive-in, Refused, Black Flag and Deftones. Bezer cited three albums as primary influences on The Blackest Beautiful: Raised Fist's Veil of Ignorance and its "tempo changes, fury and non-stop fire"; Prince's Love Symbol Album and funk style; and Public Enemy's It Takes A Nation Of Millions for its confrontational and "fight for what's right" lyrics. Butler said that there was a poetic play in their combination of melody and chaos on the album: "I think the best way for us as musicians to get people to listen is to appeal to them. Appeal to the natural rhythm of the head bob, the beating of the heart, the tap of the foot; just find that area and utilize it properly and say something."

The album's lead single, "Banshee (Ghost Fame)", was described as an "unholy collision of Refused and Rage Against the Machine". "White America's Beautiful Black Market" was a "rock rap crossover affair", a protest song about the relationship between the corporations and the United States government, as they are "sucking the dicks of corporations". "Empty Elvis" was described as "condensing Glassjaw's whole career into three mouth-foamingly [sic] exciting minutes". "That Fear Fever" fused rock, pop and metal. "Virgin Dirt" was described as a "post-rock epic". The tracks "Younger" and "The Dope Beat" were listed as examples of the band's "staggering dynamics, brain-burrowing melodies and intelligent production tricks". "Pheromone Cvlt" showed the band's "blend of deranged hardcore and aching soul"; Bezer wrote that the track possesses 'Prince levels of funked up cool'. "27 Club" was a "blistering seven-minute epic" about living life either selflessly or selfishly, with "rampages from Hendrix riffs to reggae".

=== Lyrics ===
The album's lyrics are described as 'politically, socially and personally conscious', incorporating themes such as corporate greed, racism and growing up in a broken home. Butler says it is "an ode to the disenfranchised and disaffected youth" and about accepting that we will never be perfect. Some of the lyrics reflect on his early life where he had to raise his sister and grow up at the same time. He added ambiguity to the lyrics to "facilitate" ideas for the listeners. Freeman said that the lyrics "reveal just how self-aware he is, which is a good counterpoint to those who feel that his constant vocalizing equates to selfishness."

"Banshee (Ghost Fame)" describes the differences between music as an art form and as an industry. "The Priest and Used Cars" talks about clockwork theory and how it put the fear of death into Butler when he was younger. "Pheromone Cvlt" is about a one-night stand Butler had, telling the woman the following morning that he loved her but later realizing that was a lie, the song acting as his "apology" to the woman. In an intro before playing the song at the Electric Ballroom, Butler described the song; "Imagine yourself in bed, lying next to someone that believes that you're in love with them. And then imagine walking up in the middle of the night while they're asleep and feeling compelled to write a song about how you don't know what the fuck it means to be in love. Imagine turning around in your bedroom, and looking at your bed that lies in the corner of your room and that person is still sleeping, and you want to wake that person up and you wanna tell that person your sorry for saying all the things that you said to make them believe that you were in love with them. That's kinda where I'm at right now it's um… It's a very difficult thing for me to tell this person that, "I'm sorry. I don't–I never loved you to begin with and I'm sorry that I told you that I did." Instead of telling that person exactly how I feel, I wrote a song instead, and I'm playing in front of about 1,200 people at the Electric Ballroom. So maybe, maybe she'll just hear about the song and understand that I'm sorry. I don't know."". Butler commented how the lyrics of "27 Club" focus on "when people assume I'm pumped full of drugs or a Christian. I'm misidentified all the time".

== Release and promotion ==
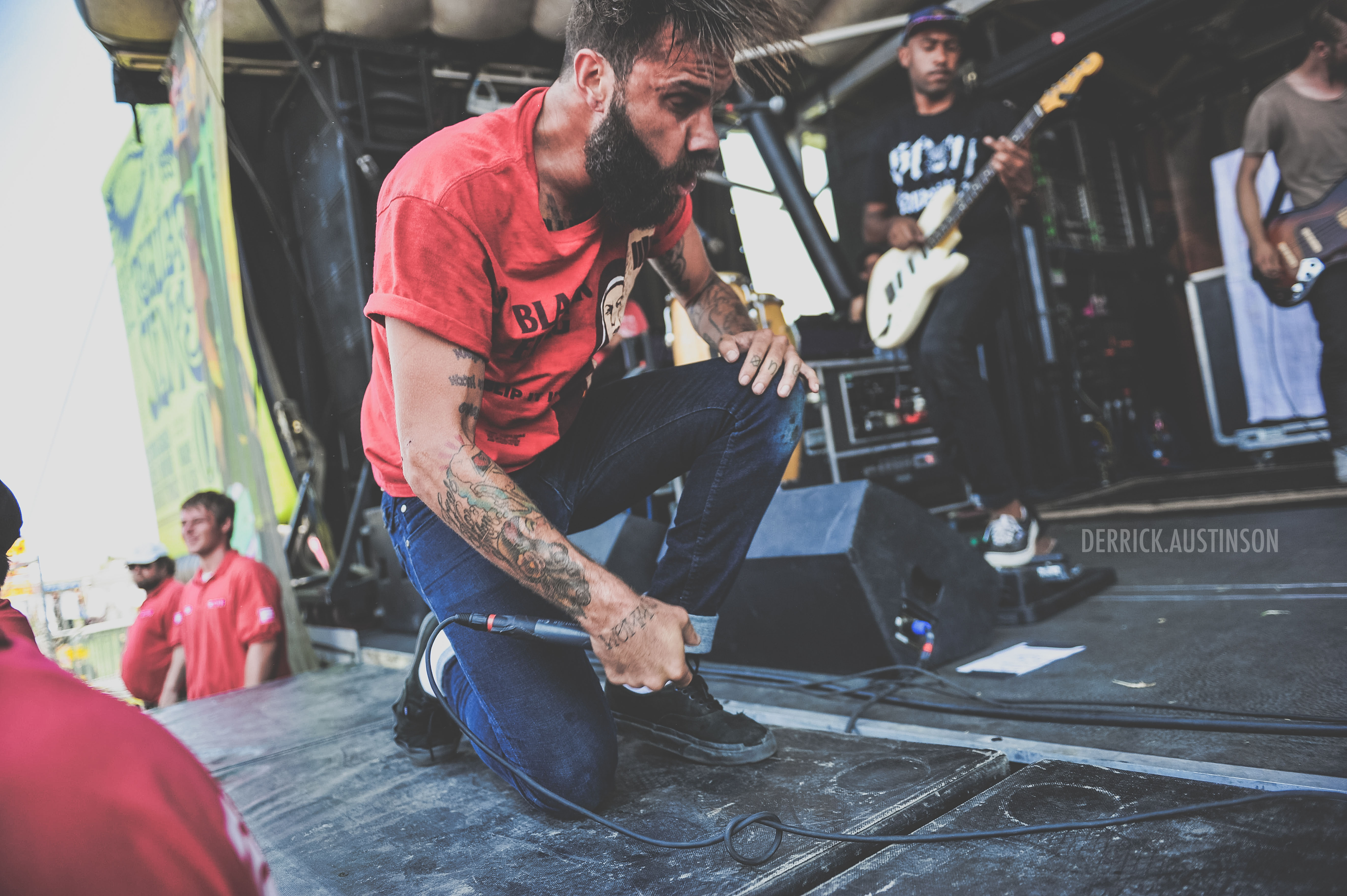
Singer of letlive. Jason Aalon Butler performing at Warped Tour 2013. Aalon Butler has been praised as the key force behind for letlive.'s chaotic and primal live performances.

The album was initially announced in Rock Sound for a summer 2013 release; later specified to be July 9, 2013. A few weeks prior to its release, the album was streamed online for free. Although Butler acknowledged that the strategy would mean the album would not sell well, he said "It's not about how many people it reaches but that it makes them feel something."

The band toured the United Kingdom and Ireland in October, playing songs from both Fake History and The Blackest Beautiful. Many of the dates were sold out; London's date was met with such high demand that it was upgraded to a larger venue from the Camden Underworld to the Electric Ballroom. At Clwb Ifor Bach, Quench magazine writer Jack Glasscock said that they are "without doubt, the most exhilarating live band around" with their primal and engaging front-man Butler, Kerrang! writer David McLaughlin gave the show a five out of five "K's". He said, "No longer just a spectacle, to be gasped at in almost voyeuristic fascination wondering what might happen next, letlive. are now about songs, feeling, performance".

In November and December, the band returned to the United States where they supported Every Time I Die with Code Orange Kids.

In February and March 2014, the band supported Bring Me the Horizon for their Sempiternal album, joining groups Of Mice & Men and Issues on The American Dream Tour. From April to May, they co-headlined a tour with Architects for their album Lost Forever // Lost Together, with support from Glass Cloud and I The Mighty. On August 26, they and Architects supported A Day To Remember at a postponed event at the Cardiff Motorpoint Arena. (Note: The show was originally postponed due to A Day To Remember's singer Jeremy McKinnon being ill. The original line-up featured Mallory Knox, Every Time I Die and The Story So Far.)

== Remixed & Remastered Re-release ==
On April 17th, the band announced on their Facebook that their album will be remixed, remastered, and revisited with album pre-orders expected to ship "Summer 2024". The post also mentions finding "suitable spaces around the world for proper farewells."

== Reception ==
=== Critical reception ===
Professional ratings
Aggregate scores
Source	Rating
Metacritic	86/100
Review scores
Source	Rating
AllMusic	4/5 stars
Big Cheese	8/10
Front	5/5 stars
The Guardian	3/5 stars
The Irish Times	4/5 stars
Kerrang!	5/5 stars
Metal Hammer	4.5/5 stars
NME	8/10
Q	4/5 stars
Rock Sound	9/10

The album received an aggregate score of 86/100 at Metacritic, based on 12 reviews, signifying "universal acclaim". Kerrang! editor James Mcmahon gave the album five out of five "K"s, classing The Blackest Beautiful as a "classic", praising the inclusion of producers Kit Walters and Stephen George. He wrote: "What The Blackest Beautiful certainly is, though, is the sound of letlive. right here and right now. And right now, letlive. sound amazing. Get Down." Metal Hammer writer Stephen Hill gave the album a nine out of ten, saying "it's hard to pick out highlights when every track sounds so fresh, joyous and casually rule-book torching" and that "this is the kind of album that changes people's lives". Chris Hidden of Rock Sound also gave a nine out of ten, calling it a "bold record" and highlighting its fusion of "staggering dynamics, brain-burrowing melodies and intelligent production".

Fred Thomas of AllMusic noted how the album is "technically dazzling and soulfully delivered aggression". Tom Doyle of This Is Fake DIY wrote that the album is a "punch in the gut to whatever expectations you might have about letlive." Channing Freeman of Sputnikmusic said while the songs lack the same immediacy in comparison to those on Fake History, they have more longevity. Although Mike Diver of Clash Music liked the album overall, he said that "Pheromone Cvlt" was "placid" and "Virgin Dirt" was "losing sting".

However, Dave Simpson, writing for The Guardian, criticized the album's "adolescent, cliched lyrics", especially from the track "The Priest and Used Cars".

=== Media picks ===
Publication	Country	Accolade	Year	Rank
Metal Hammer	UK	Modern Classics	2014	4

End of Year awards

Publication	Country	Accolade	Year	Rank
Dead Press	UK	Top 10 Albums of 2013	2013	1
Ourzone Magazine	UK	Albums of the Year 2013	2013	2
Thrash Hits	UK	Top 20 Albums of 2013	2013	7
Kerrang!	UK	The 25 Best Rock Albums of 2013	2014	7
Metal Hammer	UK	Top 50 Albums of 2013	2013	12

== Chart performance ==
The album debuted in the United States at number 74 on the Billboard 200 and number six on Hard Rock Albums, selling nearly five thousand copies. In the United Kingdom, the album debuted at number 62.

== Track listing ==
All tracks are written by letlive.

No.	Title	Length
1.	"Banshee (Ghost Fame)"	4:02
2.	"Empty Elvis"	3:05
3.	"White America's Beautiful Black Market"	3:41
4.	"Dreamer's Disease"	3:43
5.	"That Fear Fever"	3:28
6.	"Virgin Dirt"	4:46
7.	"Younger"	3:14
8.	"The Dope Beat"	4:26
9.	"The Priest and Used Cars"	3:47
10.	"Pheromone Cvlt"	4:05
11.	"27 Club"	7:29
Total length:		43:32

== Personnel ==
letlive.

- Jason Aalon Butler – lead vocals
- Ryan Jay Johnson – bass, backing vocals
- Jean Francisco Nascimento – guitar, keyboard
- Jeff Sahyoun – guitar, backing vocals

Additional personnel

- Christopher Crandall – drums, percussion

Staff

- Kit Walters – producer
- Stephen George – mixing
- Jonathan Weiner – Album artwork and layout

== Chart performance ==
Chart (2012)	Peak position
UK Album Charts (OCC)	62
UK Rock Albums (OCC)	4
UK Independent albums (OCC)	12
US Billboard 200 (Billboard)	74
US Top Hard Rock Albums (Billboard)	6
US Top Independent Albums (Billboard)	13
US Top Modern Rock/Alternative Albums (Billboard)	14
US Top Rock Albums (Billboard)	20
