= The Ghost Inside (band) =

American metalcore band

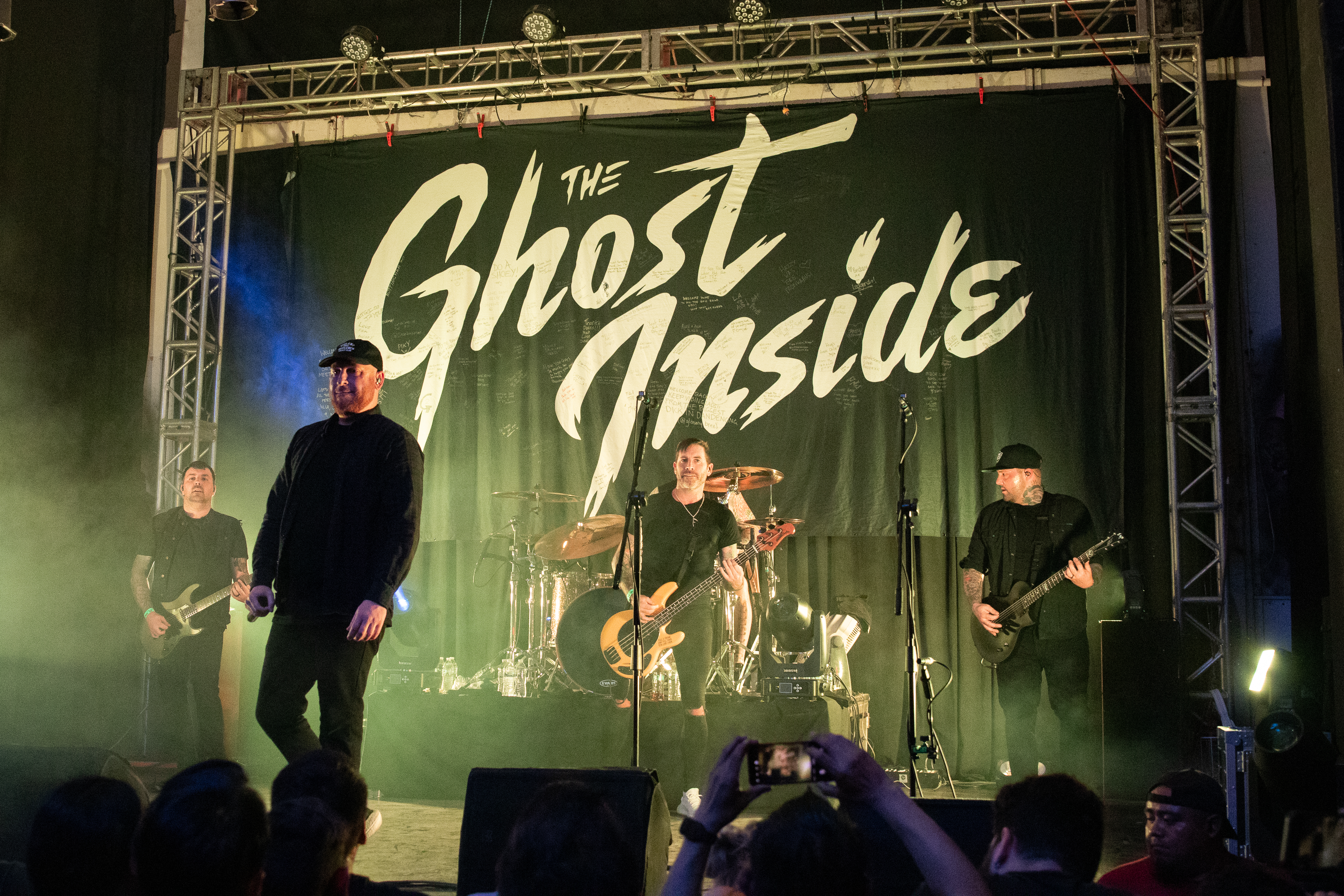
- The Ghost Inside performing in Mexico City, 2024

Background information
- Also known as: A Dying Dream (2004–2006)
- Origin: El Segundo, California, U.S.
- Genres: Srscore; metalcore; melodic hardcore
- Years active: 2004–2015; 2018–present
- Labels: Epitaph; Mediaskare
- Members: Jonathan Vigil; Zach Johnson; Jim Riley; Andrew Tkaczyk; Chris Davis
- Past members: Ryan Romero; Josh Navarro; Anthony Rivera; Tyler Watamanuk; Soyer Cole; Garrett Harer; KC Stockbridge; Aaron Brooks
- Website: theghostinside.com

The Ghost Inside, formerly known as A Dying Dream, is an American metalcore band from El Segundo, California. Formed in 2004, the band currently consists of vocalist Jonathan Vigil, guitarists Zach Johnson and Chris Davis, bassist Jim Riley and drummer Andrew Tkaczyk.

The group released a total of four studio albums in their initial run. In 2015, the band members were injured in a bus crash and forced to take a hiatus to recover. The ensemble resumed activity in 2018, and have since released two more studio albums, with their sixth album, Searching for Solace, released on April 19, 2024.

== History ==
=== Early years (2004–2009) ===
As A Dying Dream, they released an EP, Now or Never on Frontline Records. A year later, they signed to Mediaskare Records, where they re-recorded and re-released the EP with an additional track and bonus live footage. The release contained early versions of their debut album that followed. Not long after, they changed their name to The Ghost Inside, and released a full-length studio album entitled Fury and the Fallen Ones.

=== Returners (2010–2012) ===
Their second album, titled Returners, was released on June 8, 2010, via Mediaskare Records.

On February 24, 2011, it was announced that KC Stockbridge and the Ghost Inside mutually parted ways and that Andrew Tkaczyk, formerly the drummer and main songwriter in For the Fallen Dreams, had been filling in on drums. As of January 10, 2012, the band has been signed to Epitaph Records.

In 2012, the band headlined the Alternative Press Tour along with Miss May I.

=== Get What You Give (2012–2013) ===
Their first release for Epitaph Records Get What You Give, which was produced by A Day to Remember's vocalist Jeremy McKinnon was released on June 19, 2012, and debuted at No. 88 on the Billboard 200. The band toured the world in support of the album in 2013.

=== Dear Youth (2014–2015) ===
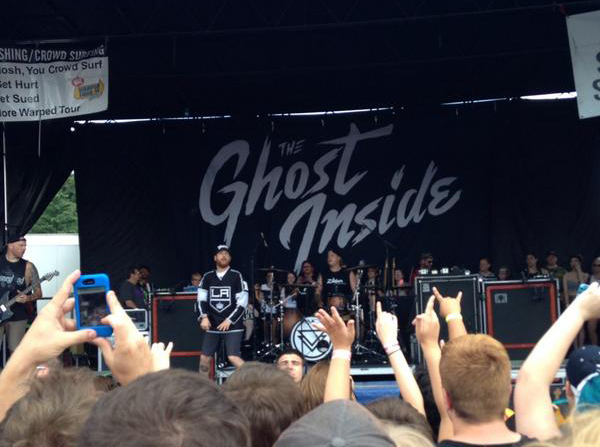
The Ghost Inside at 2014's Warped Tour

On September 8, 2014, the band released a new song "Avalanche". And on September 16, 2014, Spotify leaked details of their new album Dear Youth, which was later released on November 17, 2014, via Epitaph Records and debuted at No 63. on the Billboard 200.

On January 9, 2015, the Ghost Inside posted on their Facebook page that they are parting ways with founding member and lead guitarist Aaron Brooks, leaving Jonathan Vigil as the last original member in the current lineup.

=== Bus crash and hiatus (2015–2018) ===
On the morning of November 19, 2015, the band's tour bus collided head on with a tractor trailer while headed west to Mesa, Arizona on U.S. Highway 180, eight miles east of the border patrol checkpoint outside of El Paso, Texas. The drivers of both vehicles died, while the remaining ten people on the bus survived. Jonathan Vigil, Zach Johnson, Andrew Tkaczyk and two others were hospitalized in critical condition. On January 13, 2016, Vigil posted his first update via Instagram since the accident, where he stated his injuries and his gratefulness "to be alive". The next day, Tkaczyk confirmed via his Instagram account that the accident had resulted in him losing one of his legs following an initial ten-day coma.

On March 22, 2016, during the livestream of the Warped Tour band announcement of that year, it was announced that the Ghost Inside would play Warped Tour 2017. An announcement that far in advance was unprecedented. They were the first band announced for the tour. On March 23, 2016, Chris Davis, formerly of Texas in July, was announced as an official member after touring with the band since 2015. On February 10, 2017, Vigil announced that the band would be unable to perform on Warped Tour 2017. Warped Tour announced they would continue to hold their spot for the band until they were well enough to play, even though the Warped Tour's full cross-country format was retired the following year.

On April 17, 2018, the band held their first practice since the accident. On April 30, 2018, the band confirmed and assured their fans with a statement in which they said "Yes, there is a future."

=== Return to activity and self-titled album (2019–2023) ===
On January 21, 2019, the band shared a photo of them in studio on Twitter after a fan asked if they were working on new music. On February 22, they announced a return show for July 13, 2019, at The Shrine in Los Angeles. The show at The Shrine sold out in 4 minutes according to vocalist Jonathan Vigil. The show successfully took place on July 13, outside the venue with a festival-style stage rather than in the expo hall itself. During the show, Vigil said he was not sure if that would be the Ghost Inside's last show ever or if they would play "a hundred more," but he did announce that the band was working on new music.

In a video update on August 27, 2019, the band stated that they plan to perform some one-off shows at some point in 2020 but stressed that they are "not going on tour." On January 11, 2020, the band played their second comeback show at UNIFY Gathering in Australia.

On April 22, 2020, the band released a new single, "Aftermath", and announced their self titled album set for release on June 5, 2020.

On June 6, 2020, the Ghost Inside announced they had parted ways with longtime bassist Jim Riley following an alleged racial comment he supposedly made in 2015. In an interview that September, however, the band claimed that they reinstated Riley after determining that it was the "wrong call" to remove him from the group.

In 2021, as the COVID-19 pandemic began to lessen, the band returned to the stage once again in Worcester, Massachusetts on August 28. This would be the first time any of the songs off their self-titled record would be performed. They also planned to perform at the Blue Ridge Rock Festival in Virginia and Riot Fest in Chicago following their date at the Palladium. The band is due to return to So What?! Music Festival in Dallas, TX on Memorial Day Weekend 2022 and then the UK and Europe for shows in the summer of 2022.

=== Searching for Solace (2024–present) ===
On February 5, 2024, the band released a new single, "Wash It Away", and announced their upcoming sixth album Searching for Solace set for release on April 19, 2024.

== Musical style, influences and songwriting ==
The Ghost Inside's music has been classified as srscore, metalcore, melodic metalcore, and "melodic, emotional hardcore". They have self-identified as melodic hardcore, for example on their Facebook page. However, bassist and backing vocalist Jim Riley stated in a 2013 interview that "to [him] the band is a metalcore band" and that they're "similar to Unearth or As I Lay Dying or something like that, with a little bit less guitar solos and a little bit less singing". He said that they are influenced by "an older generation of bands" such as Throwdown, Bury Your Dead (especially Beauty and the Breakdown), Misery Signals, Killswitch Engage, Unearth (especially The Oncoming Storm) and Bleeding Through, some of which he considers "seminal to what metalcore is", as well as modern music that isn't necessarily heavy (such as pop punk), and that he himself listens "to a lot of emo". In a 2009 interview, vocalist Jonathan Vigil stated that he grew up listening to punk rock bands such as NOFX and Less Than Jake before getting into heavier bands such as Hatebreed and Slipknot, while guitarist Aaron Brooks said that he listened to bands like Bad Religion before getting into Poison the Well, that one of his favorite bands currently are Comeback Kid and that he also appreciates Hatebreed. This musical background was further confirmed when Zach Johnson listed NOFX's Punk in Drublic, Strung Out's Suburban Teenage Wasteland Blues and AFI's Black Sails in the Sunset as his favorite three albums. In a 2025 interview, Vigil called Misery Signals, Bury Your Dead and Comeback Kid as what the band "started out trying to sound like".

Riley stated that when writing a song, the band usually puts the instrumentation together first, before vocalist Jonathan Vigil and guitarist Aaron Brooks write lyrics for it. He also noted that the decision to use clean vocals in some songs of Get What You Give, such as "Engine 45", came from the band and wasn't forced by producer Jeremy McKinnon.

== Band members ==
Current

- Jonathan Vigil – lead vocals (2004–present)
- Zach Johnson – lead guitar, backing vocals (2015–present), rhythm guitar (2008–2016)
- Jim Riley – bass, clean vocals (2009–present)
- Andrew Tkaczyk – drums (2011–present)
- Chris Davis – rhythm guitar, backing vocals (2016–present; touring 2015–2016)

Former

- Ryan Romero – rhythm guitar (2004–2006)
- Josh Navarro – rhythm guitar (2004–2006)
- Anthony Rivera – drums (2004–2006)
- Tyler Watamanuk – bass (2004–2008)
- Soyer Cole – rhythm guitar (2006–2008)
- Garrett Harer – bass (2008–2009)
- KC Stockbridge – drums (2006–2011)
- Aaron Brooks – lead guitar, backing vocals (2004–2015)

Timeline

== Discography ==
The Ghost Inside discography
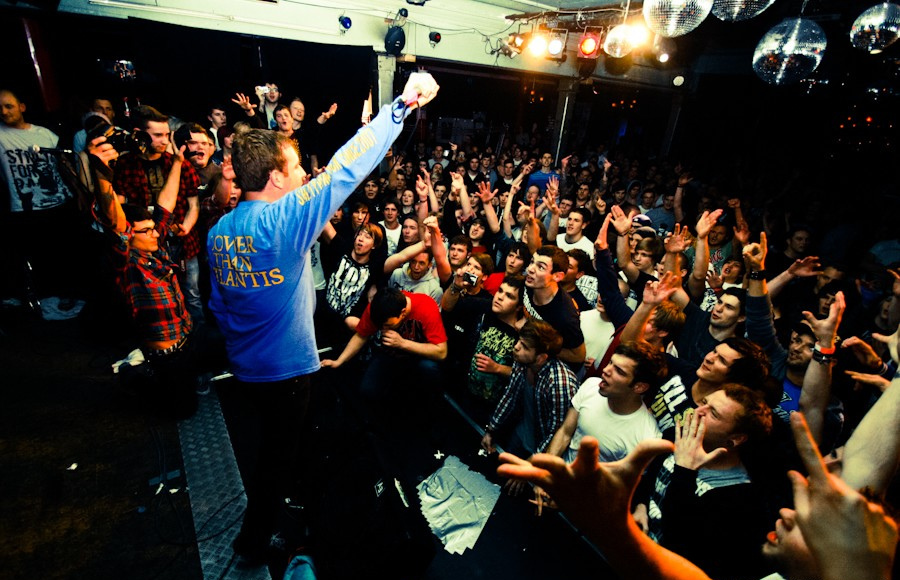
- The Ghost Inside performing in 2010
- Studio albums: 5
- Extended plays: 1
- Live albums: 1
- Music videos: 8

=== Studio albums ===
List of studio albums, with selected chart positions
Title	Album details	Peak chart positions						
Title	Album details	US	US Indie.	AUS	AUT	BEL (FL)	GER	SWI
Fury and the Fallen Ones	Released: April 15, 2008; Label: Mediaskare	—	—	—	—	—	—	—
Returners	Released: June 8, 2010; Label: Mediaskare	—	50	—	—	—	—	—
Get What You Give	Released: June 19, 2012; Label: Epitaph	88	19	—	—	—	—	—
Dear Youth	Released: November 17, 2014; Label: Epitaph	63	9	16	66	172	65	95
The Ghost Inside	Released: June 5, 2020; Label: Epitaph	141	—	5	25	51	6	37
Searching for Solace	Released: April 19, 2024; Label: Epitaph	—	—	—	—	—	57	—
"—" denotes a recording that did not chart or was not released in that territory.

=== Live albums ===
Title	Details
Rise from the Ashes: Live at the Shrine	Released: 2021

=== EPs ===
Title	Details
Now or Never	Released: 2005; Label: Frontline, Mediaskare (2006 reissue)

=== Singles ===
Year	Title	Chart positions	Album
Year	Title	US Main.	Album
2023	"Safe and Sound" (with Point North)	20	Prepare for Despair
2024	"Wash It Away"	30	Searching for Solace
