= Bury Tomorrow discography =

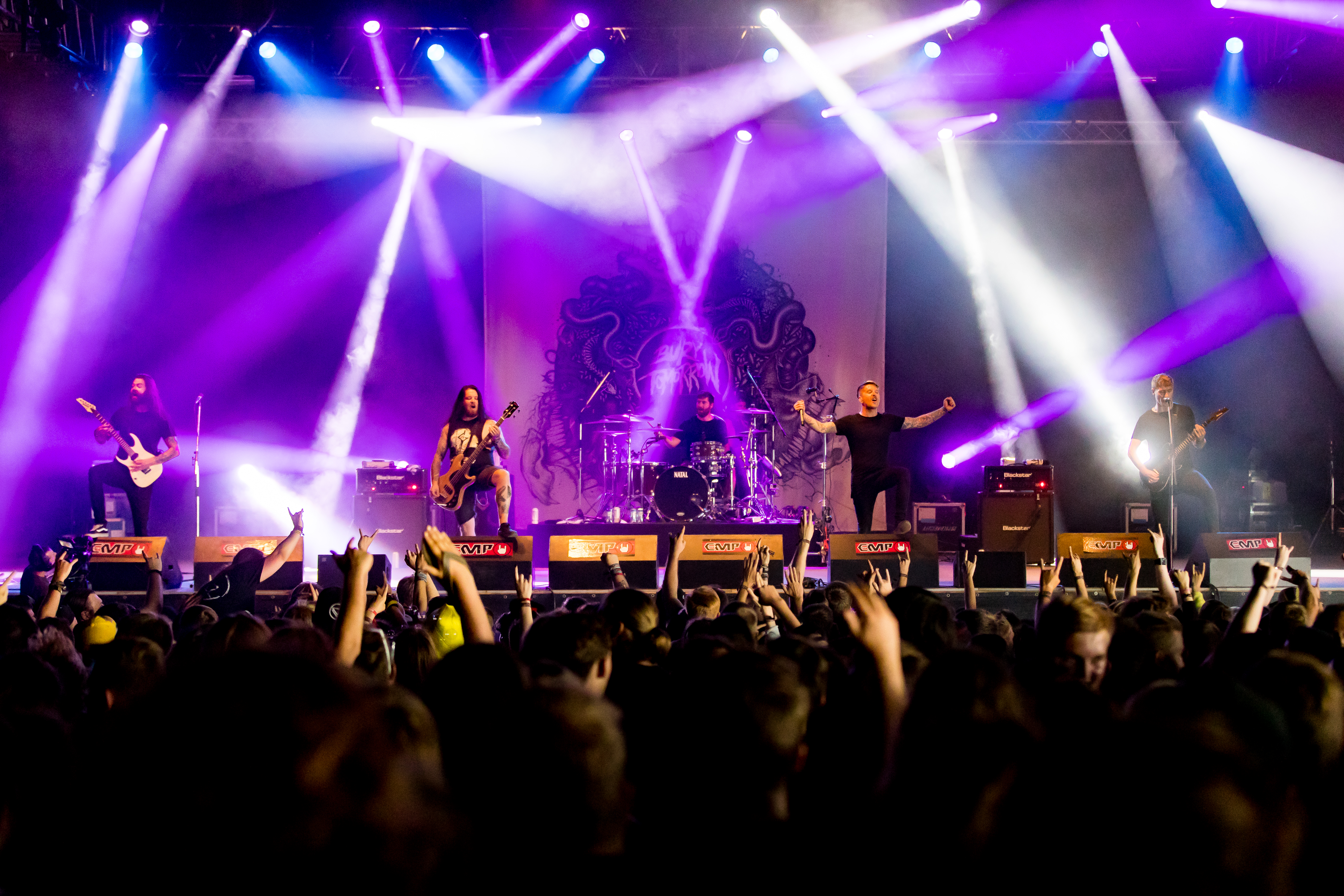
- Studio albums: 8
- EPs: 2
- Singles: 34
- Music videos: 32

Bury Tomorrow is a British metalcore band from Southampton, Hampshire, England. They have released eight studio albums and two extended plays.

== Albums ==
=== Studio albums ===
Title	Album details	Peak chart positions				
Title	Album details	UK	UK Rock & Metal	UK Indie	UK Indie Breakers	US Heat.
Portraits	Released: 12 October 2009; Label: Basick, Artery; Formats: CD, music download	—	—	—	—	—
The Union of Crowns	Released: 13 July 2012; Label: Nuclear Blast; Formats: CD, music download	—	6	11	3	25
Runes	Released: 26 May 2014; Label: Nuclear Blast; Formats: CD, music download	34	1	6	6	16
Earthbound	Released: 29 January 2016; Label: Nuclear Blast; Formats: CD, music download	36	2	6	—	14
Black Flame	Released: 13 July 2018; Label: Music For Nations, Sony Music; Formats: CD, music download	21	2	—	—	13
Cannibal	Released: 3 July 2020; Label: Music For Nations; Formats: CD, music download	10	1	—	—	—
The Seventh Sun	Released: 31 March 2023; Label: Music For Nations; Formats: CD, music download	35	1	—	—	—
Will You Haunt Me, with That Same Patience	Released: 16 May 2025; Label: Music For Nations; Formats: CD, music download	33	1	—	—	—
"—" denotes a release that did not chart.

== Extended plays ==
Title	Extended play details
The Sleep of the Innocents	Released: 2007; Label: Self-released; Format: Music download
On Waxed Wings	Released: 6 September 2010; Label: Artery, Razor & Tie; Format: Music download

== Singles ==
Title	Year	Album
"Her Bones in the Sand"	2008	Portraits
"Casting Shapes"	2008	Portraits
"You & I"	2009	Portraits
"Livin' la Vida Loca" (Ricky Martin cover)	2010	Non-album single
"Lionheart"	2011	The Union of Crowns
"Lionheart" (Eyes remix)	2011	Non-album single
"Royal Blood"	2011	The Union of Crowns
"An Honourable Reign"	2012	The Union of Crowns
"Knight Life"	2012	The Union of Crowns
"Man on Fire"	2014	Runes
"Of Glory"	2014	Runes
"Earthbound"	2015	Earthbound
"Last Light"	2016	Earthbound
"Cemetery"	2016	Earthbound
"Black Flame"	2018	Black Flame
"Knife of Gold"	2018	Black Flame
"The Age"	2018	Black Flame
"Glasswalk"	2019	Black Flame (Deluxe edition)
"The Grey (VIXI)"	2019	Cannibal
"Cannibal"	2020	Cannibal
"Choke"	2020	Cannibal
"Better Below"	2020	Cannibal
"Gods & Machines"	2020	Cannibal
"Death (Ever Colder)"	2022	Non-album singles
"Life (Paradise Denied)"	2022	Non-album singles
"Abandon Us"	2022	The Seventh Sun
"Boltcutter"	2022	The Seventh Sun
"Heretic" (featuring Loz Taylor)	2023	The Seventh Sun
"Begin Again"	2023	The Seventh Sun
"Villain Arc"	2024	Will You Haunt Me, with That Same Patience
"What If I Burn"	2024	Will You Haunt Me, with That Same Patience
"Let Go"	2025	Will You Haunt Me, with That Same Patience
"Waiting"	2025	Will You Haunt Me, with That Same Patience
"Forever the Night"	2025	Will You Haunt Me, with That Same Patience

== Music videos ==
Title	Year	Director	Album	Type	Link
"Casting Shapes"	2007	Natasha Nater	Portraits	Performance	
"Her Bones in the Sand"	2008	Unknown	Portraits	Performance	
"You & I"	2009	Steve Hogg	Portraits	Live footage	
"Lionheart"	2012	Tom Welsh	The Union of Crowns	Performance	
"Lionheart" (Eyes remix)	2012	Unknown	Non-album single	Tour footage	
"Royal Blood"	2012	Tom Welsh	The Union of Crowns	Narrative	
"An Honourable Reign"	2012	Sitcom Soldiers	The Union of Crowns	Performance	
"Knight Life"	2012	Sitcom Soldiers	The Union of Crowns	Performance	
"Sceptres"	2013	Tom J. Cronin	The Union of Crowns	Tour footage	
"Man on Fire"	2014	Unknown	Runes	Performance	
"Of Glory"	2014	Tom J. Cronin	Runes	Tour footage	
"Earthbound"	2015	Unknown	Earthbound	Performance	
"Last Light"	2016	Unknown	Earthbound	Narrative	
"Cemetery"	2016	Sitcom Soldiers	Earthbound	Performance	
"The Burden"	2017	Matt Veitch	Earthbound	Tour footage	
"Black Flame"	2018	Unknown	Black Flame	Performance	
"Knife of Gold"	2018	Unknown	Black Flame	Narrative	
"The Age"	2018	Unknown	Black Flame	Performance	
"More Than Mortal"	2018	Unknown	Black Flame	Narrative	
"My Revenge"	2019	Unknown	Black Flame	Tour footage	
"The Grey (VIXI)"	2019	Unknown	Cannibal	Performance	
"Cannibal"	2020	Unknown	Cannibal	Performance	
"Better Below"	2020	Unknown	Cannibal	Performance	
"Death (Ever Colder)"	2022	Unknown	Non-album singles	Narrative	
"Life (Paradise Denied)"	2022	Unknown	Non-album singles	Performance	
"Abandon Us"	2022	Matt Sears	The Seventh Sun	Narrative	
"Boltcutter"	2022	Matt Sears	The Seventh Sun	Narrative	
"Heretic"	2023	Matt Sears	The Seventh Sun	Performance	
"Wrath"	2024	John Gyllhamn	The Seventh Sun	Tour footage	
"Villain Arc"	2024	Ricky Allen	Will You Haunt Me, with That Same Patience	Narrative	
"What If I Burn"	2024	Unknown	Will You Haunt Me, with That Same Patience	Narrative	
"Let Go"	2025	Unknown	Will You Haunt Me, with That Same Patience	Narrative	
