= The Seventh Sun =

Studio album by Bury Tomorrow
- Released: 31 March 2023
- Genre: Metalcore
- Length: 42:22
- Label: Music for Nations
- Producer: Dan Weller

Bury Tomorrow chronology
| Cannibal (2020) | The Seventh Sun (2023) | Will You Haunt Me, with That Same Patience (2025) |

Singles from The Seventh Sun
- 1. "Abandon Us" Released: 6 October 2022; 2. "Boltcutter" Released: 28 November 2022; 3. "Heretic" Released: 15 February 2023; 4. "Begin Again" Released: 16 March 2023

The Seventh Sun is the seventh studio album by British metalcore band Bury Tomorrow. The album was released on 31 March 2023 through Music for Nations and it was produced by Dan Weller. It is the first album to feature the band's new rhythm guitarist Ed Hartwell (ex-Heart in Hand) and keyboardist/clean vocalist Tom Prendergast.

== Background and promotion ==
Following the departure of Cameron, Bury Tomorrow performed at Slam Dunk Festival 2021 with new members Ed Hartwell (rhythm guitar) and Tom Prendergast (clean vocals and keyboards).

On 6 October, the band published the lead single "Abandon Us" and an accompanying music video. At the same time, they officially announced the album itself and release date, while also revealing the album cover and the track list. On 28 November, the band released the second single "Boltcutter" along with a music video. On 15 February 2023, the band released the third single "Heretic" featuring Loz Taylor of While She Sleeps and its corresponding music video. On 16 March, two weeks before the album release, the band premiered the fourth single "Begin Again".

== Critical reception ==
Professional ratings
Review scores
| Source | Rating |
|---|---|
| Distorted Sound | 10/10 |
| Kerrang! | 5/5 stars |
| Louder Sound | 4/5 stars |
| Rock 'N' Load | 9/10 |
| Rock Sins | 10/10 |
| Wall of Sound | 8/10 |

The album received positive reviews from critics. Dan McHugh of Distorted Sound scored the album 10 out of 10 and said: "Whilst not to demerit their previous accomplishments this effort is something special. Just when you thought Cannibal was Bury Tomorrow's magnum opus, along comes The Seventh Sun, blowing it clean out of the water. From front to back, this set of tracks is an undeniable force of nature where not a single misstep is to be found. Every song has the quality to stand tall on its own accord but together they are a powder-keg ready to take the world by storm." Kerrang! gave the album 5 out of 5 and stated: "This is a version of Bury Tomorrow free from their shackles, attacking with the precision of an apex predator and mastering their art with sublime execution. The Seventh Sun is a glorious new dawn." Louder Sound gave the album a positive review and stated: "The easy career path for Bury Tomorrow would be to pander to the rock audience. Their popularity may still surge off the back of The Seventh Sun, but that they've arguably got even heavier says everything about their attitude and commitment to making the music they love."

Rock 'N' Load praised the album saying, "Bury Tomorrow have turned a massive corner and is no longer the next big thing, they are the now and future. Having taken the handbrake off and just focussing on themselves, The Seventh Sun is that album and even though it may have taken roughly 15 years to get to this point, it is here and just enjoy it. It's a belter." Tasha Brown of Rock Sins rated the album 10 out of 10 and said: "Summarising The Seventh Sun into a single paragraph when there is so much to say about the album proves difficult. Bury Tomorrow has evolved into the form we all know they could have taken years ago. No longer are they the underdog of British metalcore, or metal as a whole. This is a force to be reckoned with. The Seventh Sun is this band's magnum opus, a masterpiece of ferocity and a must listen for any metal fan." Wall of Sound gave the album a positive review saying: "The Seventh Sun does everything fans are going to want from a Bury Tomorrow album. It is full of sing along choruses, massive riffs, and of course demonic screams and angelic cleans. Throw in a couple of tasty breakdowns and guitar solos for good measure and were onto the usual winning recipe. Given the major lineup change, I think Bury Tomorrow have delivered a note-worthy effort, staying true to their roots, and thickening their trunk, while experimenting with the new lineup's potential just enough to grow a few new branches."

== Track listing ==
The Seventh Sun track listing
| No. | Title | Length |
|---|---|---|
| 1. | "The Seventh Sun" | 3:41 |
| 2. | "Abandon Us" | 3:42 |
| 3. | "Begin Again" | 3:35 |
| 4. | "Forced Divide" | 3:27 |
| 5. | "Boltcutter" | 3:37 |
| 6. | "Wrath" | 5:06 |
| 7. | "Majesty" | 4:16 |
| 8. | "Heretic" (featuring Loz Taylor of While She Sleeps) | 3:32 |
| 9. | "Recovery?" | 3:46 |
| 10. | "Care" | 3:06 |
| 11. | "The Carcass King" (featuring Cody Frost) | 4:34 |
| Total length: | | 42:22 |

== Personnel ==
Bury Tomorrow

- Daniel Winter-Bates – unclean vocals
- Kristan Dawson – lead guitar, backing vocals
- Ed Hartwell – rhythm guitar
- Davyd Winter-Bates – bass
- Adam Jackson – drums, percussion
- Tom Prendergast – keyboards, clean vocals

Additional musicians

- Lawrence "Loz" Taylor of While She Sleeps – guest vocals on track 8
- Cody Frost – guest vocals on track 11

Additional personnel

- Dan Weller – production, engineering, programming
- Ellis "The Power" Powell-Bevan – engineering
- Joseph McQueen – mixing
- Chris Athens – mastering

== Charts ==
Chart performance for The Seventh Sun
| Chart (2023) | Peak position |
|---|---|
| Australian Hitseekers Albums (ARIA) | 10 |
| Austrian Albums (Ö3 Austria) | 71 |
| Belgian Albums (Ultratop Flanders) | 104 |
| German Albums (Offizielle Top 100) | 14 |
| Scottish Albums (Official Charts) | 15 |
| Swiss Albums (Schweizer Hitparade) | 51 |
| UK Albums (Official Charts) | 35 |
| UK Rock & Metal Albums (Official Charts) | 1 |
