= Wax Wings =

Wax Wings may refer to:

- Daedalus and Icarus, Greek mythological figures who are said to have flown with wings made of feathers and wax
- Wax Wings, a 2013 album by Joshua Radin

== See also ==
- Waxwing (disambiguation)
- "Waxed Wings", a song by Bury Tomorrow from their 2009 album Portraits
