= Bury Tomorrow =

British metalcore band

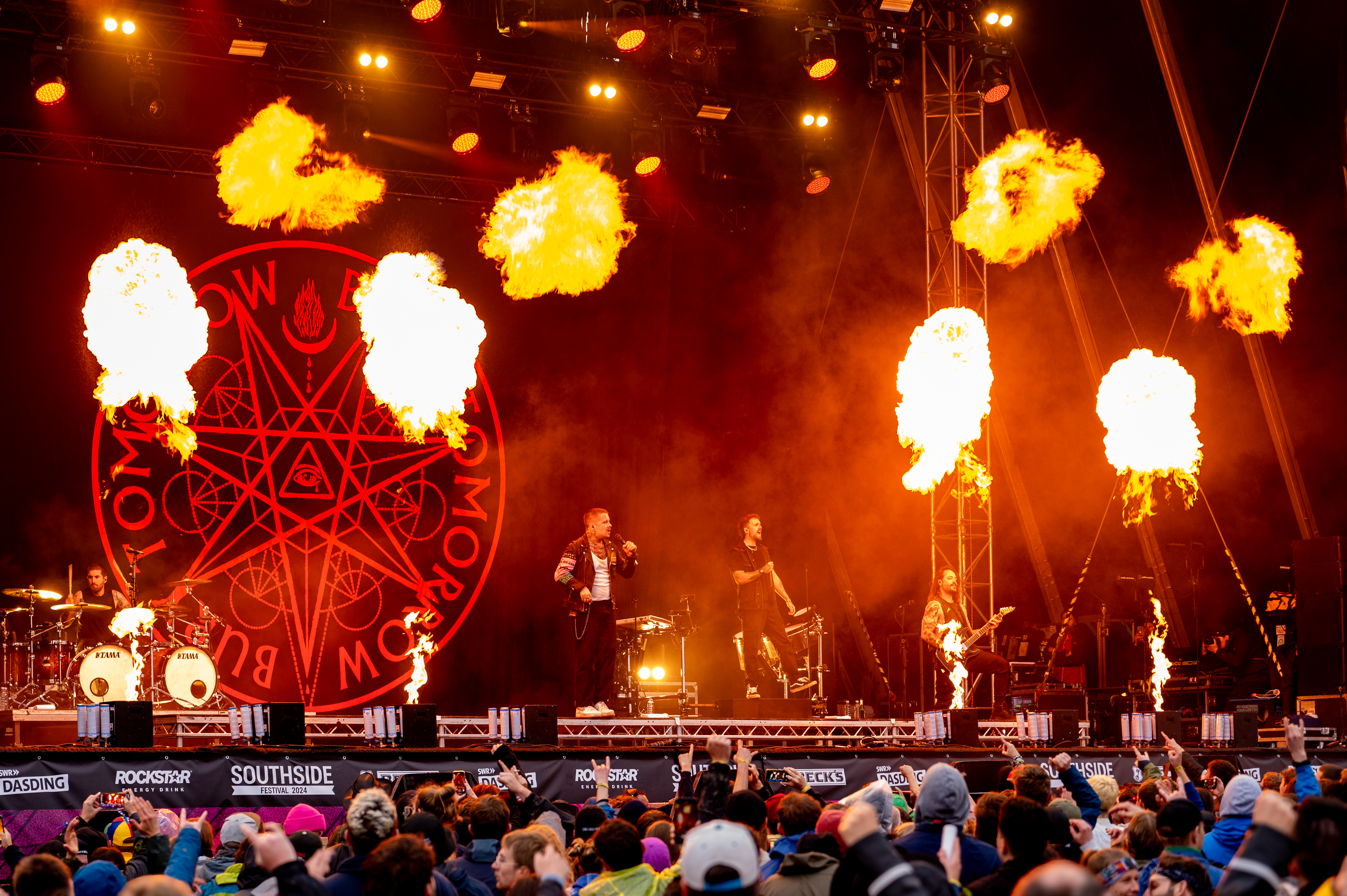
- Bury Tomorrow performing at Southside Festival in 2024

Background information
- Origin: Southampton, Hampshire, England
- Genres: Metalcore; melodic metalcore; post-hardcore
- Works: Bury Tomorrow discography
- Years active: 2006–present
- Labels: Basick; Artery; Razor & Tie; Nuclear Blast; Sony Music; Music For Nations; Death
- Members: Daniel Winter-Bates; Davyd Winter-Bates; Adam Jackson; Kristan Dawson; Ed Hartwell; Tom Prendergast
- Past members: Andy Bryne; Mehdi Vismara; Jason Cameron
- Website: bury-tomorrow.com

Bury Tomorrow are a British metalcore band formed in 2006 in Southampton, Hampshire, England. The band is composed of six members; lead vocalist Daniel Winter-Bates, bassist Davyd Winter-Bates, drummer Adam Jackson, lead guitarist Kristan Dawson, who replaced founding guitarist Mehdi Vismara in 2013, rhythm guitarist Ed Hartwell, and keyboardist and vocalist Tom Prendergast, who both replaced Jason Cameron in 2021. Bury Tomorrow have released eight studio albums, their most recent being Will You Haunt Me, with That Same Patience, released on 16 May 2025.

== History ==
=== Formation and debut album Portraits (2006–2010) ===
The band was formed in 2006 in Hampshire, England, with their initial line-up consisting of rhythm guitarist and singer Jason Cameron, drummer Adam Jackson, lead vocalist Andy Bryne, keyboardist Daniel Winter-Bates, his brother bassist Davyd Winter-Bates and lead guitarist Mehdi Vismara. The band, despite reading in press that "metalcore" had become a dirty word of such, was adamant to prove that the metalcore genre was still relevant. In 2007, they self-released their debut EP The Sleep of the Innocents. Shortly after the EP's release, Andy Byrne left the band and keyboardist Daniel Winter-Bates became the frontman.

Their debut album Portraits was released through Basick Records in Britain in October 2009. Two music videos were shot to support the release of the album, but only one, "You & I", was broadcast on music channels. The music video for "You & I" was recorded at Unit Night Club and featured Bury Tomorrow performing to 200 fans. The video was shot over the course of two days, with the second day focusing on the band performing. "You & I" was broadcast on MTV2 in the United States, Scuzz in the United Kingdom and on Much Music in Canada. Portraits was then released through Artery Recordings in March 2010 in Japan and the United States. Bury Tomorrow toured continuously over the course of 2010, touring across the United States, Europe and Japan. In their tours in 2010, the band supported Asking Alexandria, Of Mice & Men, Sleeping with Sirens, and Pierce the Veil.

=== The Union of Crowns and Vismara's departure (2011–2013) ===
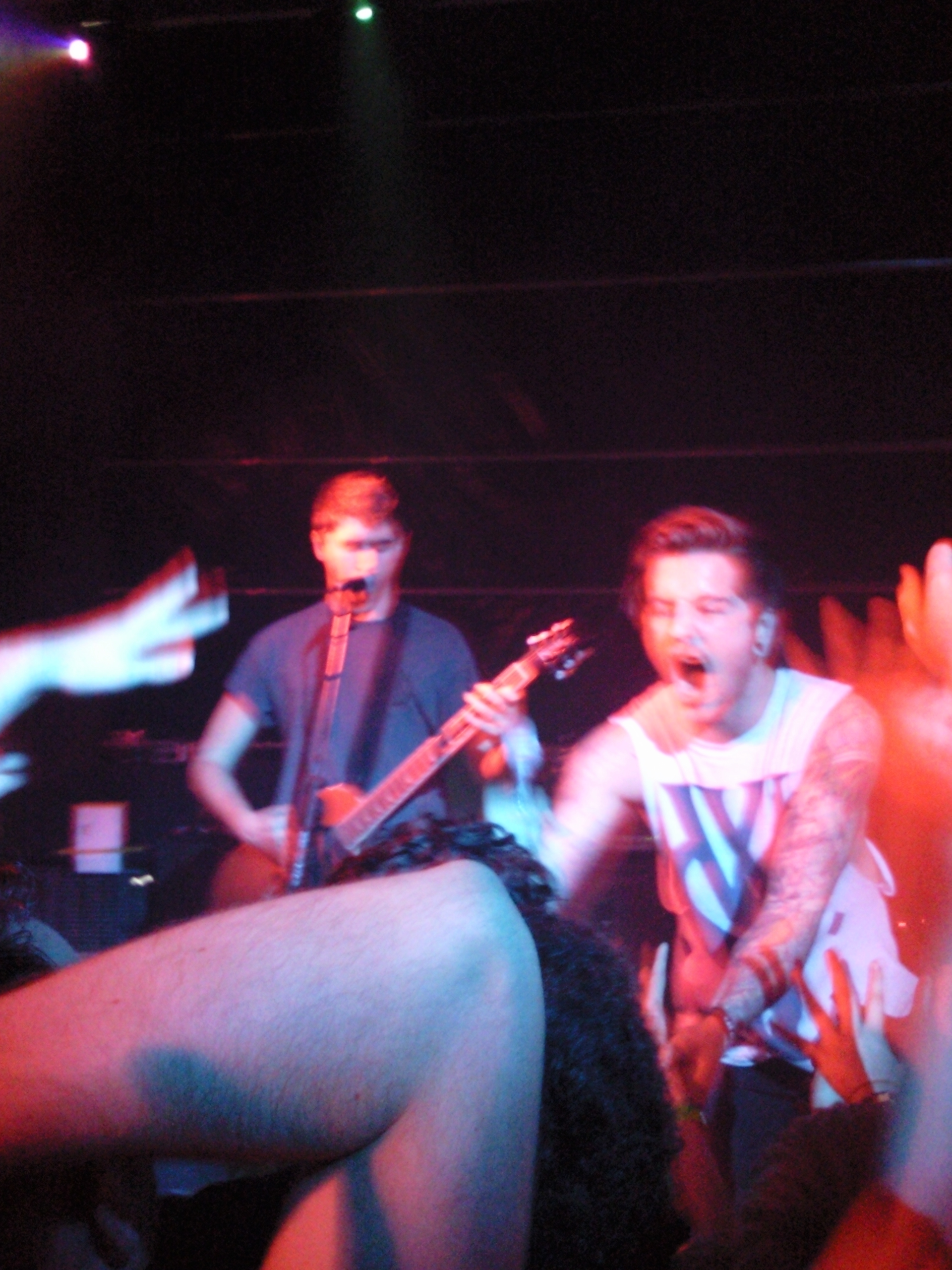
Bury Tomorrow's vocalists Jason Cameron (left) and Dani Winter-Bates (right) performing in 2012

In 2011, the band was pressured by their American record label Artery Recordings to move and base themselves in the United States. Bury Tomorrow's band members perceived this as an attempt to manipulate them and change them into something they were not by suggesting they should incorporate more electronic elements into their music style. While they rejected moving, communication broke down between them and Artery Recordings and the band ended up losing their North American and Japanese record label as well as their American agency.

The band was very low on money and could not afford to go to the studio to record the album they had written in 2011. Their agent managed to get them performances at Slam Dunk Festival and Ghostfest in Leeds.

Their performances at these festivals were met with a positive response from fans. At Ghostfest, Bury Tomorrow met their future band manager, who suggested that they shelf the album they had been writing. Instead, they wrote and recorded "Lionheart", the first single for what would later become their second album, released on 8 September 2011 and accompanied by a music video released on 13 September. Bury Tomorrow supported British metalcore band While She Sleeps in October, with a follow-up UK headline tour in December. On 6 December, two days before the band started the headline tour, a video was released for their single "Royal Blood", directed by Thomas Welsh. "Royal Blood" was later broadcast on Radio 1 on Christmas Eve during its daytime programme.

Bury Tomorrow spent the first few months of 2012 recording their second album, with only a few tour dates in the first half of 2012 to support the album's release. Starting on 18 March by headlining Southampton's Takedown Festival, they went on to support Of Mice & Men and appear at Hit The Deck Festival in April before appearing at Greenfield Festival on 17 June and at Ghostfest in Leeds on 30 June. In April 2012, Bury Tomorrow announced that they had signed to Nuclear Blast and confirmed the album art, track listing and release date of their second album, The Union of Crowns. The band said that signing to the new record label allowed them to record it the way they wanted to, which they would not be able to do with their old label, Artery Recordings. The album was recorded in Ridgeway Sound Studio in Wantage and was released on 13 July in Europe, 16 July in the United Kingdom and 17 July in the United States.

Two singles were released in 2012 to promote The Union of Crowns: "An Honourable Reign", which was premiered on BBC Radio 1 and "Knight Life". In the United Kingdom, the album debuted at number 6 on the Rock & Metal Chart, and in the United States, it peaked at number 25 on the Top Heatseekers chart and sold 1,062 copies in its first week. Bury Tomorrow played a single date on 10 July at the Camden Underworld supporting I Killed the Prom Queen on their European tour, before appearing at Hevy Music Festival in early August. They also toured Britain with Architects in November alongside Deez Nuts and The Acacia Strain. This tour was wrapped around both Bury Tomorrow's and Architects' appearance at UK Warped Tour, including at Alexandra Palace in London on 10 November 2012.

In late January 2013, the band announced that lead guitarist Mehdi Vismara had left Bury Tomorrow and that Kristan Dawson would assume his position. They described Dawson as a more technical and riff-heavy guitarist, saying that this complements the band's stylistic ideas for their third album. In February, the band supported The Ghost Inside on the "Rock Sound Impericon Exposure Tour" across the United Kingdom. Vocalist Daniel Winter-Bates made a guest appearance on the song "Broken Lights" from Heart in Hand's album Almost There, which was released on 11 February.

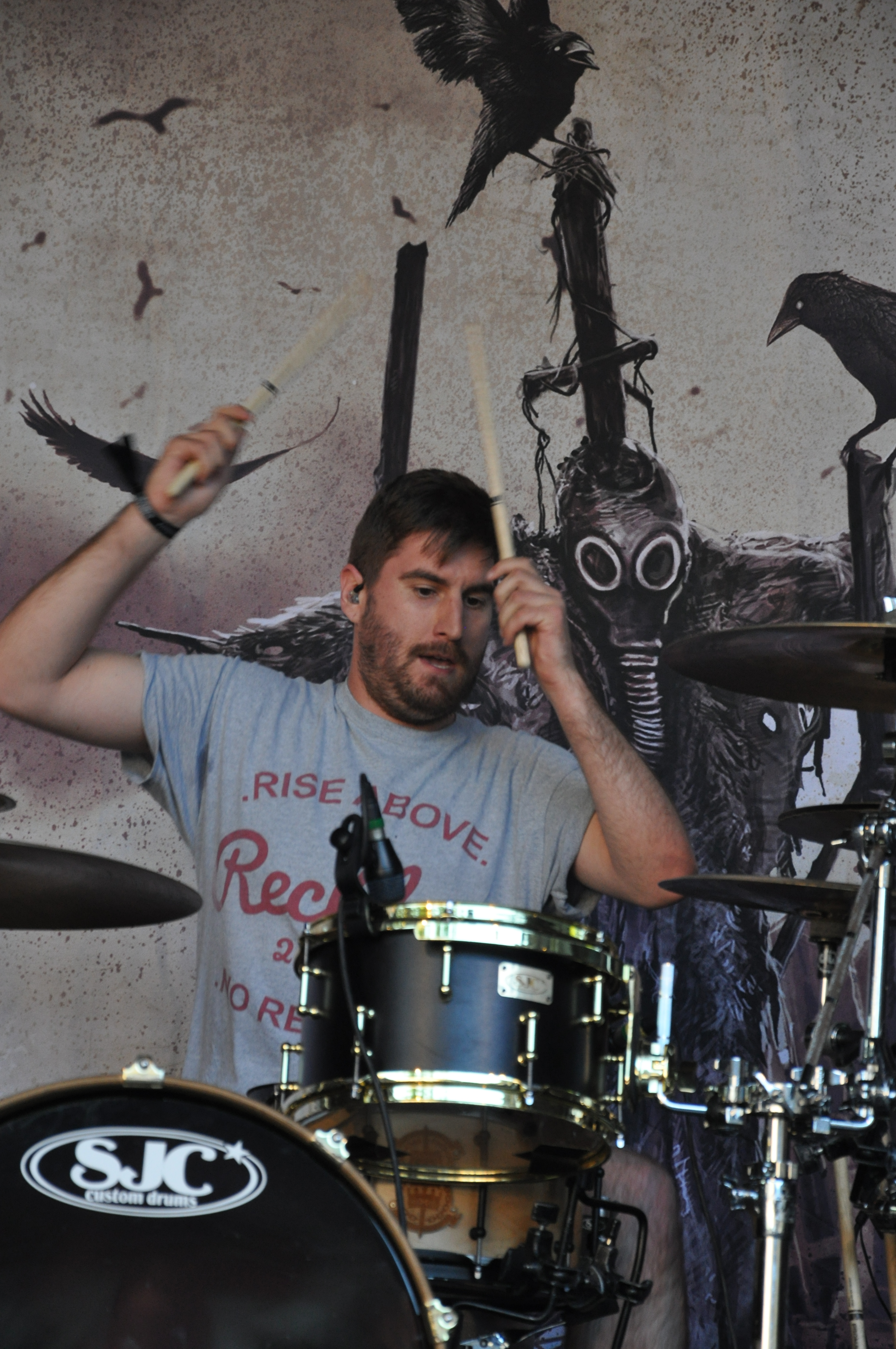
Drummer Adam Jackson at Summerblast Festival 2014

Bury Tomorrow ended the promotion of The Union of Crowns in 2013 after appearing at several festivals, including Slam Dunk, Download, Greenfield, Reading and Leeds Festivals, Summerjam, Schools Out, Pell Mell and SummerBlast, as well as touring both in the UK in September and outside of the UK. Rock Sound praised their performance at Leeds Festival, writing: "They came as underdogs, but given the reception they're afforded this afternoon, it's safe to say that Bury Tomorrow will be leaving with more than a few new friends." Bury Tomorrow then went to the United States in October to write and record their third album.

=== Runes (2014–2015) ===
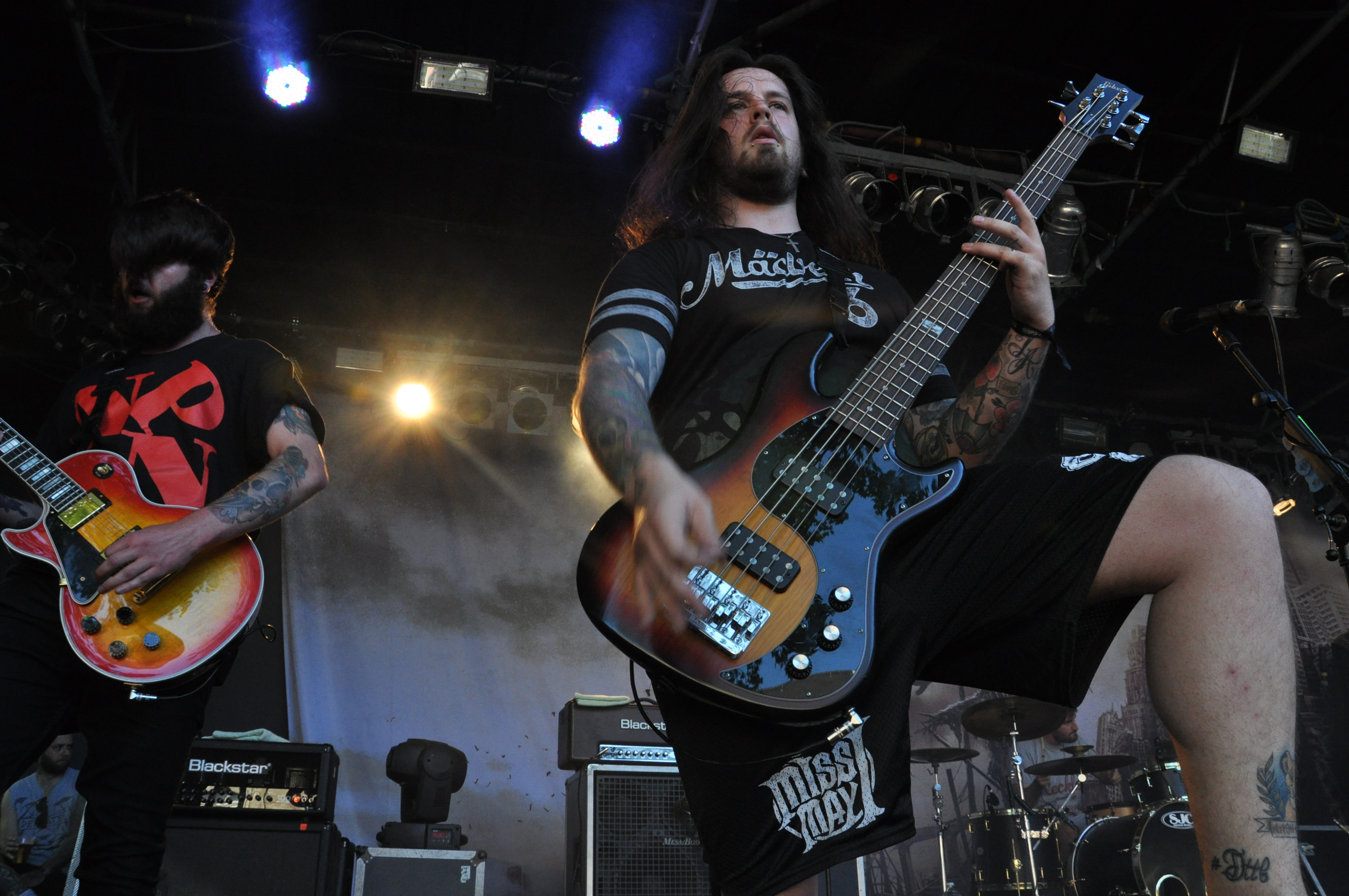
Lead guitarist Kristan Dawson (left) and bassist Davyd Winter-Bates (right) at Summerblast Festival 2014

On 6 January 2014, Bury Tomorrow announced the release of a third studio album, titled Runes, on 26 May through Nuclear Blast, as well as the release of an exclusive track from the album, titled "Watcher", which premiered on the Radio 1 Rock Show at midnight on 6 January. They also announced a headline European tour with Chunk! No, Captain Chunk!, Demoraliser and Napoleon, taking place in May. The music video for the first single from Runes titled "Man on Fire" was released on 25 February, followed on 13 May by "Of Glory". The album itself was made available for exclusive streaming by Rock Sound on 21 May 2014 a few days before its release on 26 May.

By 1 June 2014, it had reached number 1 on the official UK Rock chart and number 34 in the official UK Album chart. Later in June, the band announced another European headline tour, set for October, with support from Hands Like Houses, In Hearts Wake and Slaves. In February 2015, they toured the UK with Don Broco, We Are the in Crowd and Beartooth as part of that year's Kerrang! Tour.

=== Earthbound (2016–2017) ===
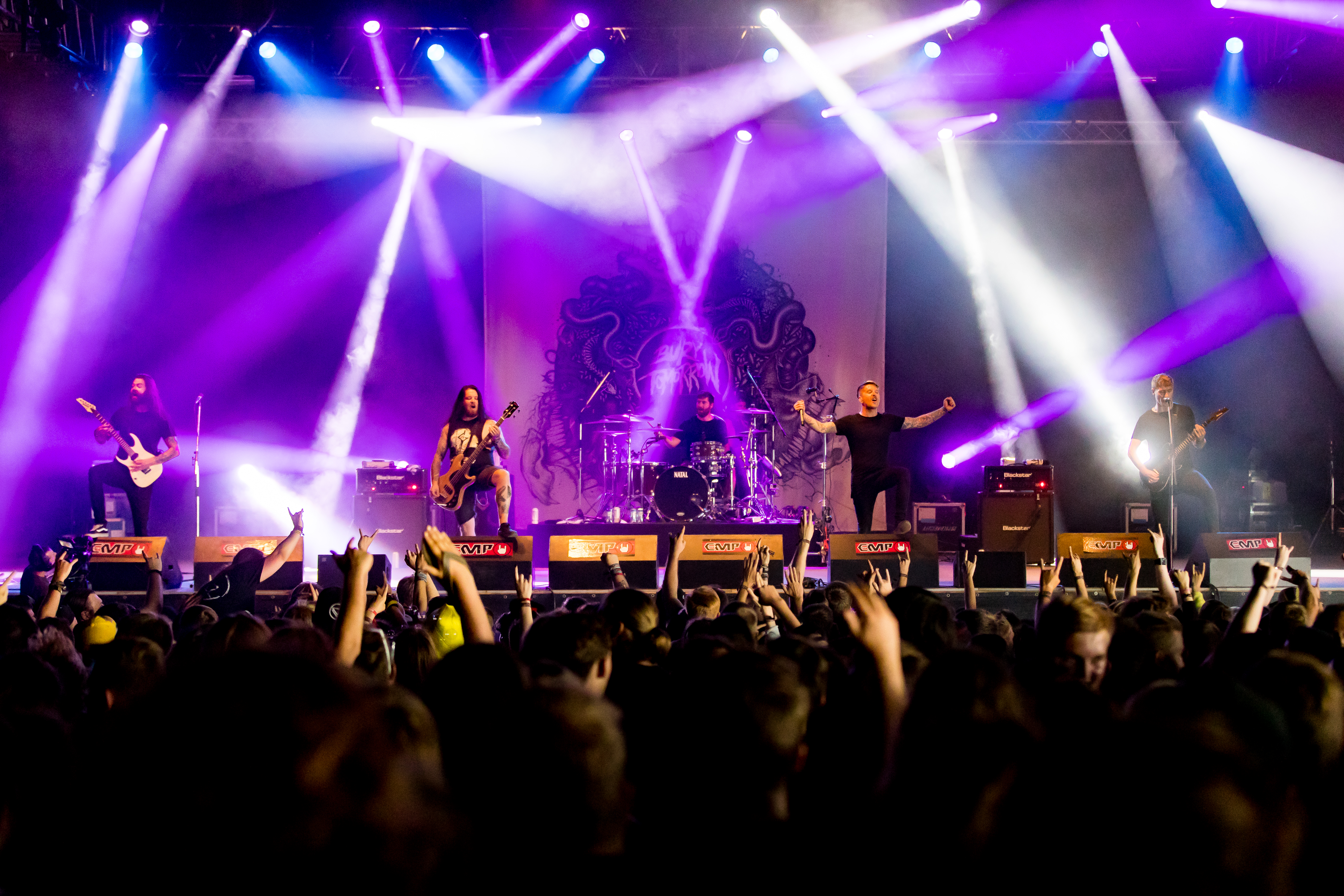
Bury Tomorrow live at Summer Breeze Open Air in 2016

While performing at Slam Dunk North 2015, Bury Tomorrow announced that they had just finished working on their fourth full-length album, but did not reveal when it will be released. At Reading and Leeds Festival 2015, they debuted the first song from the album. On 1 November, they officially released the song, titled "Earthbound" and accompanied by a music video. At the same time, the band announced that their fourth album, also titled Earthbound, is set for release worldwide on 29 January 2016 through Nuclear Blast.

On 9 January 2016, three weeks before the album release, the band released the second single of the album "Last Light" and its corresponding music video. On 15 February, Bury Tomorrow signed to UPRAWR Music Publishing. On 25 November, nine months after the album release, the band released a music video for the song "Cemetery" and made it as the third and last single of the album.

In an interview with Dead Press! on 15 April 2017, frontman Daniel confirmed that the band had written some of the follow-up to Earthbound and that they plan on recording at some point later in the year. In the same interview, he also disclosed that the band intend to celebrate the tenth anniversary of Portraits in some way once it comes about in 2019.

=== Black Flame (2017–2019) ===
On 27 October 2017, the band left Nuclear Blast and confirmed their signing with Sony Music and Music For Nations. During the months of October and November, the band headlined their "Stage Invasion" tour with metalcore band Loathe as their support act.

On 13 April 2018, the band released the lead single and title track "Black Flame" along with an accompanying music video. That same day, the band revealed the track list, album's official artwork and announced that their fifth studio album, the first distributed by the new labels, Black Flame, was set for release on 13 July 2018. On 1 June, the band released the second single "Knife of Gold" and its corresponding music video. On 29 June, two weeks before the album release a music video for the song "The Age" and made it as the third and last single of the album.

On 14 June 2019, the band announced the deluxe edition of Black Flame which contains the bonus track "Glasswalk" and live versions of three songs from the original album while also released the bonus track "Glasswalk" as a new single of the album.

=== Cannibal and Cameron's departure (2019–2021) ===
In an Instagram Q&A with their fans, guitarist/vocalist Jason Cameron confirmed that a new album would be released in 2020. On 29 November 2019, the band released the lead single of their upcoming album titled "The Grey (VIXI)" and its corresponding music video. On 10 January 2020, the band released the second single and title track "Cannibal" along with an accompanying music video. That same day, the band revealed the track list, album's official artwork and announced that their new upcoming sixth studio album Cannibal was set for release on 3 April 2020.

On 13 February, the band released the third single of the album titled "Choke". On 20 March, presumably due to the ongoing COVID-19 pandemic concerns, the band announced that they delayed the release of the album to 3 July in a bid to help them properly promote it. On 2 April, the band released the fourth single "Better Below" along with an accompanying music video. On 26 June, a week before the album release, the band released their fifth single "Gods & Machines". On 13 July 2021, the band announced that founding rhythm guitarist and clean vocalist Jason Cameron departed from the band on good terms.

=== New members and The Seventh Sun (2022–2023) ===
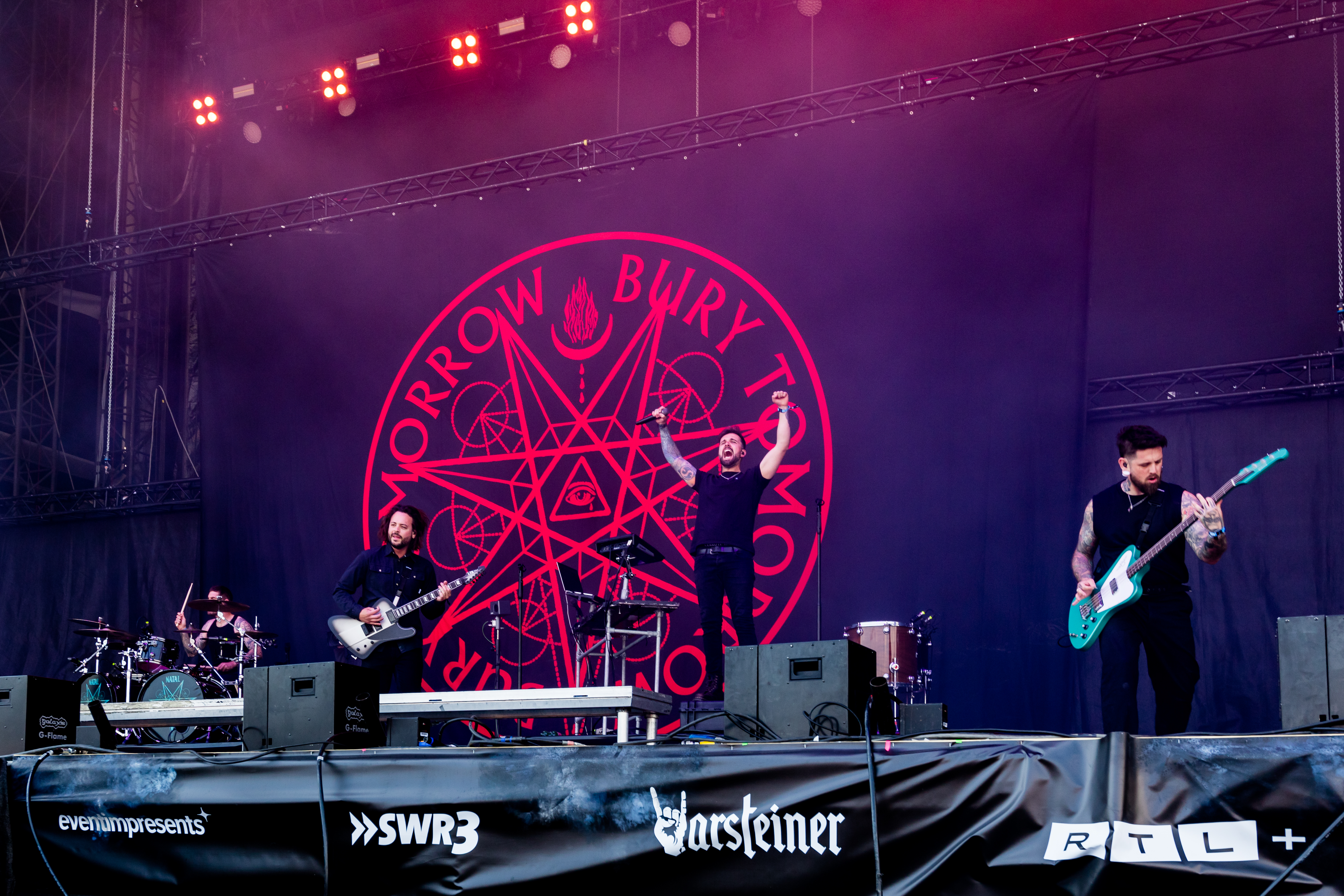
Bury Tomorrow performing at Rock am Ring 2023

Following the departure of Cameron, Bury Tomorrow performed at Slam Dunk Festival 2021 with two new members. The new members are Ed Hartwell (rhythm guitar) and Tom Prendergast (clean vocals and keyboards). On 24 March 2022, the band released a brand new single "Death (Ever Colder)" along with a music video. On 1 June, the band unveiled another single "Life (Paradise Denied)" and its corresponding music video.

On 6 October, the band published the lead single "Abandon Us" and an accompanying music video. At the same time, they officially announced that their seventh studio album, The Seventh Sun, would be released on 31 March 2023, whilst also revealing the album cover and the track list. On 28 November, the band released the second single "Boltcutter" along with a music video. On 15 February 2023, the band released the third single "Heretic" featuring Loz Taylor of While She Sleeps and its corresponding music video. On 16 March, two weeks before the album release, the band premiered the fourth single "Begin Again".

=== Will You Haunt Me, with That Same Patience (2024–present) ===
On 31 May 2024, Bury Tomorrow released the single "Villain Arc" and an accompanying music video. On 22 November, the band released another single "What If I Burn" and its corresponding music video. At the same time, they announced that their eighth studio album, Will You Haunt Me, with That Same Patience, would be released on 16 May 2025. On 24 January 2025, the band released the third single "Let Go" along with a music video. On 7 March, they released the fourth single "Waiting". On 25 April, the fifth and final single, "Forever the Night", was released.

== Musical style ==
Bury Tomorrow have been described as metalcore, melodic metalcore, and post-hardcore. AllMusic writer Gregory Heaney wrote: "Offsetting layers of pleasant, atmospheric melody with sudden bursts of chugging heaviness, the band uses its breakdowns to create a brooding, moody effect, as if the songs are lurching into a fit when provoked from their somber ruminations." Vocalist Daniel Winter-Bates has stated that he likes the ability of his band to go "heavier" and "lighter" with ease.

The band has referred to older metalcore bands as their primary source of influence, with Metal Hammer journalist Merlin Alderslade commenting on their style by saying "the quintet's blend of fierce, melodic death metal-inspired riffage and gloriously anthematic choruses was seen as of the crowning achievements of a new generation of metal bands that had been weaned on a diet of The End of Heartache, Waking the Fallen and Reroute to Remain." They also cited the Ghost Inside as an influence upon their early work. Prior to the release of their third album, Runes, Bury Tomorrow stated that it was going to be more technical, "old school" and in line with artists like As I Lay Dying and Killswitch Engage than their previous releases.

== Band members ==
Current

- Daniel Winter-Bates – unclean vocals (2007–present), keyboards (2006–2007)
- Davyd Winter-Bates – bass (2006–present)
- Adam Jackson – drums, percussion (2006–present)
- Kristan Dawson – lead guitar, backing vocals (2013–present)
- Ed Hartwell – rhythm guitar (2021–present)
- Tom Prendergast – clean vocals, keyboards (2021–present)

Former

- Andy Bryne – unclean vocals (2006–2007)
- Mehdi Vismara – lead guitar (2006–2013)
- Jason Cameron – clean vocals, rhythm guitar (2006–2021)

Timeline

== Discography ==
Studio albums

- Portraits (2009)
- The Union of Crowns (2012)
- Runes (2014)
- Earthbound (2016)
- Black Flame (2018)
- Cannibal (2020)
- The Seventh Sun (2023)
- Will You Haunt Me, with That Same Patience (2025)

== Awards ==
On 7 May 2014, it was announced that Bury Tomorrow had been nominated for the 'Best British Newcomer' award at the 2014 Kerrang! Awards.
