= Raw Nerve =

Raw Nerve may refer to:

- Raw Nerve (1990 film), a 1990 Australian film
- Raw Nerve (1991 film), an American psychological thriller
- Raw Nerve (1999 film), an American crime drama
- Raw Nerve (company), a film production company
- Shatner's Raw Nerve, a TV interview program
- Raw Nerve, an album by X Is Loaded
