= Earthbound (Bury Tomorrow album) =

2016 studio album by Bury Tomorrow

Studio album by Bury Tomorrow
- Released: 29 January 2016
- Genre: Metalcore
- Length: 36:36
- Label: Nuclear Blast
- Producer: Caleb Shomo

Bury Tomorrow chronology
Runes (2014)	Earthbound (2016)	Black Flame (2018)

Singles from Earthbound
- 1. "Earthbound" Released: 1 November 2015; 2. "Last Light" Released: 9 January 2016; 3. "Cemetery" Released: 25 November 2016

Earthbound is the fourth studio album by British metalcore band Bury Tomorrow. It was released on 29 January 2016 through Nuclear Blast. It was produced by Caleb Shomo, the lead vocalist of the band Beartooth. This is their last release on Nuclear Blast due to their signing to Music For Nations and Sony Music.

== Background and promotion ==
In an interview with TeamRock Radio, vocalist Dani Winter-Bates and guitarist Kristan Dawson indicated Earthbound was written over the course of six weeks while the band was on tour. While performing at Slam Dunk North 2015, Bury Tomorrow announced that they had just finished working on the album, but did not reveal when it will be released. At Reading and Leeds Festival 2015, they debuted the first song from the album. On 1 November, they officially released the song, titled "Earthbound" and accompanied by a music video. At the same time, the band announced the album itself.

On 9 January 2016, three weeks before the album release, the band released the second single of the album "Last Light" and its corresponding music video. On 15 February, Bury Tomorrow signed to UPRAWR Music Publishing. On 25 November, nine months after the album release, the band released a music video for the song "Cemetery" and made it as the third and last single of the album.

== Composition ==
=== Influences, style and themes ===
In a Kerrang! interview, Dani Winter-Bates weighed in on his thoughts surrounding the album, stating that "[To him], Earthbound feels like the distillation of everything we've ever wanted this band to be about. Our first three records are kind of part of their own trilogy but this is Bury Tomorrow's record, we all see this as our chance to show people what we are capable of. A big thing for us this time around was to get down to the real nitty gritty of what our fans wanted from us and how to give them without wasting a single second, with Earthbound we wanted pace, we wanted heaviness, and for me, personally, I wanted to write a record which was the sonic embodiment of a circle pit. I think we’ve done that."

In a Rock Sound interview, Dani Winter-Bates offered insight on the album's writing process, stating that the band "[didn't] want to be writing songs that are modern metalcore, we [wanted] to be writing music akin to the bands selling out arenas, bands like Disturbed and Avenged Sevenfold. We're trying to write on a grander scale. We've always written to the venues we want to sell out. I think with this album we've got there." Winter-Bates also commented further on the album's sound, stating that "We wanted to really find a sound that lasts and has that longevity, which is a hard thing to do. For us it was just to staple this is Bury Tomorrow. There's no gimmick, no concept behind the album, it's literally 10 songs that are an onslaught on the ears."

On the album's lyrical themes, Winter-Bates has stated that he regards them as being "quite anecdotal in places", adding that "It's the first time we have ever [written anecdotal lyrics] really and had the opportunity to go wildly into different subjects with each track. This is Bury Tomorrow – there is no hiding behind extravagant intros and all that. The lyrics manifest themselves in that way, approaching things that are negative but can be perceived as positive… then there's the environmental change, political stuff – it just goes into a lot of that."

Speaking of the album's title-track with Dead Press!, which covers global-sized issues like climate change, Winter-Bates explained, "It's very hard to see that we are heading in a positive way. I think our world is pretty shot to be honest with you, but that's kind of the feeling that that song has. In people not being vegetarian, people killing animals, people like Trump being put in power, having a Prime Minister that nobody voted for, and us leaving the European Union. At the time that I was writing that record I think it was very hard to see a way out... There's a generation of kids that are being brought up the right way, but there's still people out there that are still spreading hate that is influencing that. It is what it is, and Earthbound is truly about that."

In the same interview, Winter-Bates also commented on why they settled on this also being the choice for the album's title, saying "It's certainly an overview of a lot of themes that are kind of running around that. That feeling of helplessness, in all senses of the word."

== Critical reception ==
Professional ratings
Review scores
Source	Rating
Already Heard	4/5 stars
Dead Press!	9/10 stars
Distorted Sound	9/10 stars
Louder Sound	4/5 stars
New Noise	4/5 stars
RAMzine	5/5 stars
Rock Sins	9/10

The album received mostly positive reviews from several critics. Already Heard rated the album 4 out of 5 and said: "Whilst other bands from the genre have opted to take a more accessible approach, Bury Tomorrow have stuck to their roots with Earthbound; raw, unrelenting and packed full of 'mosh-made' anthems (see '301' ft Hatebreed's Jamey Jasta). Throughout, there is an urgency that doesn't let up thus making Earthbound a juggernaut of a record. Consider that glass ceiling well and truly smashed!" Zach Redrup from Dead Press! rated the album positively calling it: "Earthbound is undoubtedly a 10-track arsenal that sees Bury Tomorrow in full stride, and secures them as one of the – if not the very – brightest gem in the crown of British metalcore. If nothing else, this record helps pin the story that giving up is never an option. This Southampton outfit have risen from a bleak time when there was little hope of a future for them, reared themselves from barking pups into savage roaring beasts, and more than capable to trample underfoot all who stand in their way." Writer for Distorted Sound, James Weaver, said: "This is the record that will send Bury Tomorrow into the stratosphere, driving them to compete with the best in British metal." Louder Sound gave the album a very positive review and stated: "The real star of the show, however, is frontman Dani Winter-Bates; his throaty roar has matured into a real force of nature, as highlighted on 'Cemetery', boasting a scream so hellacious it sounds like an outtake from a Lord Of The Rings Uruk-hai audition. Finally, Bury Tomorrow have produced the album they've been threatening to make their whole career." New Noise gave the album 4 out of 5 and stated: "Melodic hardcore is a genre that's been beaten to ground, for the past ten years. Bury Tomorrow, on the other hand, is a band that constantly pushes the envelope and show they are one of the very few at the top of the melodic hardcore pile. It proved to be a difficult challenge to follow up their critically acclaimed album Runes, but somehow they met and exceeded all expectations with the sure-to-be classic Earthbound. Their knack for combining original heavy riffs and formative melodies makes for a great time." RAMzine gave a perfect score 5 out of 5 and stated: "Earthbound is a substantial step forward which gives fans what they want, whilst also doing themselves justice by mixing it up, keeping their sound consistent and precise. This, alongside 2014 album Runes is just the beginning of what is to come for the band, who are on course to becoming one of the best British Metalcore bands out on the circuit." Jamie Giberti of Rock Sins rated the album 9 out of 10 and said: "Overall, Earthbound is an absolutely stunning piece of work from Bury Tomorrow. An album packed with great songs, it is a huge statement of intent that Bury Tomorrow have served on the UK metal world and beyond. Bury Tomorrow are sounding better than ever, and this time there should be no stopping them."

== Track listing ==
No.	Title	Length
1.	"The Eternal"	3:23
2.	"Last Light"	3:56
3.	"Earthbound"	3:42
4.	"The Burden"	3:26
5.	"Cemetery"	4:06
6.	"Restless & Cold"	3:33
7.	"301" (featuring Jamey Jasta of Hatebreed)	3:19
8.	"Memories"	3:53
9.	"For Us"	3:19
10.	"Bloodline"	3:55
Total length:		36:36

== Personnel ==
Bury Tomorrow

- Daniel Winter-Bates – unclean vocals
- Jason Cameron – rhythm guitar, clean vocals
- Kristan Dawson – lead guitar, backing vocals
- Davyd Winter-Bates – bass
- Adam Jackson – drums, percussion

Additional musicians

- Jamey Jasta of Hatebreed – guest vocals on track 7

Additional personnel

- Caleb Shomo – production

== Charts ==
Chart (2016)	Peak position
Belgian Albums (Ultratop Flanders)	90
German Albums (Offizielle Top 100)	64
Scottish Albums (Official Charts)	48
UK Albums (Official Charts)	36
UK Album Downloads (Official Charts)	31
UK Independent Albums (Official Charts)	6
UK Rock & Metal Albums (Official Charts)	2
US Heatseekers Albums (Billboard)	14
