= Will You Haunt Me, with That Same Patience =

Studio album by Bury Tomorrow
- Released: 16 May 2025
- Recorded: 2024
- Genre: Metalcore
- Length: 42:51
- Label: Music for Nations
- Producer: Carl Bown

Bury Tomorrow chronology
The Seventh Sun (2023)	Will You Haunt Me, with That Same Patience (2025)

Singles from Will You Haunt Me, with That Same Patience
- 1. "Villain Arc" Released: 31 May 2024; 2. "What If I Burn" Released: 22 November 2024; 3. "Let Go" Released: 24 January 2025; 4. "Waiting" Released: 7 March 2025; 5. "Forever the Night" Released: 22 April 2025; 6. "Silence Isn't Helping Us" Released: 16 May 2025

Professional ratings
Review scores
Source	Rating
Distorted Sound	7/10
Kerrang!	4/5
Louder Sound	4/5 stars

Will You Haunt Me, with That Same Patience is the eighth studio album by British metalcore band Bury Tomorrow. The album was released on 16 May 2025 through Music for Nations.

== Background and promotion ==
The album was produced by Carl Bown, known for his production work with Sleep Token, Bullet for My Valentine, and While She Sleeps, due to their previous album producer Dan Weller being unavailable. Lead vocalist Dani Winter-Bates explained that Bown "has a way of placing sounds to make them sound organic and not crushed, but also produced at the same time. That’s such a cool thing he can do. He’s been around heavy metal music for a long time. He knows the game, the sounds, and what’s going on. Also, he has produced the biggest band on the planet."

On 3 June 2024, the band published the lead single "Villain Arc". On 22 November, the band released the second single "What If I Burn" along with a music video, and officially announced the album itself and release date, while also revealing the album cover and the track list. On 24 January 2025, the band released the third single "Let Go" along with a music video. On 7 March, the band released the fourth single "Waiting". On 22 April, the band released the fifth single "Forever the Night". On 16 May, the day the album was released, the band premiered the sixth single "Silence Isn't Helping Us".

The band will tour in support of the album in the UK in October 2025.

== Track listing ==
All tracks are written by Bury Tomorrow.

Will You Haunt Me, with That Same Patience track listing
No.	Title	Length
1.	"To Dream, to Forget"	3:34
2.	"Villain Arc"	3:39
3.	"Wasteland"	3:21
4.	"What If I Burn"	3:52
5.	"Forever the Night"	4:05
6.	"Waiting"	3:38
7.	"Silence Isn't Helping Us"	3:46
8.	"Found No Throne"	4:32
9.	"Yōkai (妖怪)"	3:55
10.	"Let Go"	3:53
11.	"Paradox"	4:36
Total length:		42:51

== Personnel ==
Credits adapted from Tidal.

=== Bury Tomorrow ===
- Kristan Dawson – guitar
- Ed Hartwell – guitar
- Adam Jackson – drums
- Tom Prendergast – clean vocals, keyboards, programming
- Davyd Winter-Bates – bass
- Dan Winter-Bates – unclean vocals

=== Additional contributors ===
- Carl Bown – production, mixing
- Steven Kerry – mastering
- Jim Pinder – engineering
- Stijn Donders – violin and engineering on "What If I Burn", "Found No Throne", and "Paradox"

== Charts ==
Chart performance for Will You Haunt Me, with That Same Patience
Chart (2025)	Peak position
Austrian Albums (Ö3 Austria)	44
Belgian Albums (Ultratop Flanders)	115
German Albums (Offizielle Top 100)	12
UK Albums (OCC)	33
UK Rock & Metal Albums (OCC)	1
