= Cannibal (Bury Tomorrow album) =

Studio album by Bury Tomorrow
- Released: 3 July 2020
- Studio: Middle Farm Studios, South Devon, UK; Vale Studios, London, England
- Genre: Metalcore
- Length: 42:04
- Label: Music For Nations
- Producer: Dan Weller

Bury Tomorrow chronology
Black Flame (2018)	Cannibal (2020)	The Seventh Sun (2023)

Singles from Cannibal
- 1. "The Grey (VIXI)" Released: 29 November 2019; 2. "Cannibal" Released: 10 January 2020; 3. "Choke" Released: 13 February 2020; 4. "Better Below" Released: 2 April 2020; 5. "Gods & Machines" Released: 26 June 2020

Cannibal is the sixth studio album by British metalcore band Bury Tomorrow. Originally scheduled for release on 3 April 2020, it was released on 3 July 2020 through Music For Nations. It was produced by Dan Weller. The album hit the Top 10 of album charts in the UK, Germany, Switzerland and Scotland. It is the last album to feature the band's founding rhythm guitarist and clean vocalist Jason Cameron before he left the band in July 2021.

== Background and promotion ==
In an Instagram Q&A with their fans, guitarist/vocalist Jason Cameron confirmed that a new album will be released in 2020.

On 29 November 2019, the band released the lead single of their upcoming album titled "The Grey (VIXI)" and its corresponding music video. On 10 January 2020, the band released the second single and title track "Cannibal" along with an accompanying music video. That same day, the band revealed the tracklist, album's official artwork and announced that their new upcoming sixth studio album Cannibal is set for release on 3 April 2020. On 13 February, the band released the third single of the album titled "Choke".

On 20 March, presumably due to the ongoing COVID-19 pandemic concerns, the band announced that they delayed the release of the album to 3 July in a bid to help them properly promote it. On 2 April, the band released the fourth single "Better Below" along with an accompanying music video. On 26 June, a week before the album release, the band released their fifth single "Gods & Machines".

== Critical reception ==
Professional ratings
Review scores
Source	Rating
AllMusic	4/5 stars
Dead Press!	7/10
Distorted Sound	7/10
Kerrang!	4/5 stars
KillYourStereo	55/100
Louder Sound	4/5 stars
Rock 'N' Load	10/10
Rock Sins	9/10
Wall of Sound	5/10

The album received mostly positive reviews, but also mixed reviews from several critics. AllMusic gave the album a positive review saying, "While hardly an updated recipe – strident, gravel-gargling verses that yield soaring clean choruses – it's a dish that the band have perfected over the years, and Cannibal is the finest representation of that sound to date." Damon Taylor from Dead Press! rated the album positively but saying: "With Cannibal, Bury Tomorrow lean on their strengths and tighten up the more meandering elements of previous records to create a direct yet effective metalcore album. Whilst the lack of progression may be disappointing to some, the record does deliver a cohesive and solid collection of tracks." Distorted Sound scored the album 7 out of 10 and said: "If you're going into Cannibal already hesitant that the Southampton crew often can't resist overdoing their blend of vocal styles – you'll find little respite on this record. Even with that said though, what is here is solid enough, and pretty much what you'd expect to receive from BURY TOMORROW at this point if you've followed their journey, just don't expect to be blown away. Coming off the back of their most successful moment, it was always going to be difficult for BURY TOMORROW to attain the same level of success without taking an unexpected shift. Cannibal strays away from reinvention, which, for most will be welcoming news – but if you were worried that the quintet might have already seen their peak on Black Flame, by the looks of it, you may have been right."

Kerrang! gave the album 4 out of 5 and stated: "Black Flame was an important album for Bury Tomorrow, seeing them take a huge step forward towards modern metal's top table. Cannibal looks set to continue that momentum. And if it helps Dani and anyone else to deal with their demons as it goes, that can only be a very good thing." Hunter Hewgley from KillYourStereo gave the album 55 out of 100 and said: "While FAR from perfect, Cannibal shows that Bury Tomorrow are aware of their strengths and are playing to them well. I can't say that I'm in love with Cannibal, but I also can't say I truly dislike it either. I find myself somewhere in that hard to distinguish middle: content and admiring the clear potential that Bury Tomorrow display but also not having it 'wow' me at all. For me, Cannibal definitely seems to be this U.K. band's most cohesive work, but I still cannot bring myself to enjoy them quite as much as others rightfully do. While I know that Bury Tomorrow's fanbase will adore Cannibal, I can't help but see it for what it is: a flawed, familiar-sounding melodic metalcore album, with a couple good songs spread out amongst the larger track list. Even so, Bury Tomorrow still seem ahead of many other bargain bin metalcore bands who attempt this sound. They just need one truly great album to cement them as a stand-out act, in my mind. Bury Tomorrow have a lot of great qualities, and a lot of potentials to make something pretty damn amazing in the future, but as a whole, Cannibal simply fails to eat its way into my heart." Louder Sound gave the album a very positive review and stated: "The sheer talent and artistic wisdom it takes to produce such a towering, jam-packed record nearly 15 years down the line proves why Bury Tomorrow are still such a formidable force in the metalcore realm today. Neatly balancing stunning melodies with teeth-clenching brutality throughout, they've made show-stopping metalcore look easy once again."

Rock 'N' Load praised the album saying, "Bury Tomorrow have set their own bar exceptionally high with this record, it has been very well put together, each track standing out and not a filler in sight. They've poured blood, sweat, tears, passion and so much more into this, the music matching the emotion in the vocals is something they've managed to execute well and it makes for a fantastic listen." Simon Crampton of Rock Sins rated the album 9 out of 10 and said: "Musically Cannibal more than lives up to its end of the bargain, proving to be a much tighter and heavier prospect than its predecessor, proving once and for all that Bury Tomorrow are a certified banger factory. This is an album that grows stronger with each repeated listen revealing new parts of itself to the listener over time, and rewarding you for sticking with it and giving yourself over to it." Wall of Sound gave the album a score 5/10 and saying: "I'm not going to pick standouts from this album, but I will pick a stand out element, and that's the guitars. Oh my gosh, they're damn good. So good in fact, that I wish they'd do an instrumental version. But in the end, Bury Tomorrow have created an enjoyable album. Is it going-to-blow-your-mind amazing? No. But does it hit the spot? Yes."

== Commercial performance ==
Metal Hammer named it as the 16th best metal album of 2020.

== Track listing ==
Cannibal track listing
No.	Title	Length
1.	"Choke"	3:47
2.	"Cannibal"	4:15
3.	"The Grey (VIXI)"	3:58
4.	"Imposter"	3:27
5.	"Better Below"	3:12
6.	"The Agonist"	4:02
7.	"Quake"	4:25
8.	"Gods & Machines"	4:05
9.	"Voice & Truth"	3:06
10.	"Cold Sleep"	3:39
11.	"Dark, Infinite"	4:01
Total length:		42:04

== Personnel ==
Credits adapted from AllMusic.

Bury Tomorrow

- Daniel Winter-Bates – unclean vocals
- Jason Cameron – rhythm guitar, clean vocals
- Kristan Dawson – lead guitar, backing vocals
- Davyd Winter-Bates – bass
- Adam Jackson – drums, percussion

Additional personnel

- Dan Weller – production, programming
- Pete Miles and Jamie Ward – engineering
- Adam "Nolly" Getgood – mixing
- Ermin Hamidovic – mastering
- James Isaacs – design
- Adam Burke – artwork

== Charts ==
Chart performance for Cannibal
Chart (2020)	Peak position
Austrian Albums (Ö3 Austria)	19
German Albums (Offizielle Top 100)	3
Scottish Albums (OCC)	8
Swiss Albums (Schweizer Hitparade)	10
UK Albums (OCC)	10
UK Rock & Metal Albums (OCC)	1
