= The Union of Crowns =

Studio album by Bury Tomorrow
- Released: 13 July 2012
- Studio: CDS Studios, Chelmsford, Essex, UK; Ridgeway Sound Studios, Wantage, Oxfordshire
- Genre: Melodic metalcore
- Length: 54:49
- Label: Nuclear Blast
- Producer: Antony Smith; Pedro Teixeira

Bury Tomorrow chronology
Portraits (2009)	The Union of Crowns (2012)	Runes (2014)

Singles from The Union of Crowns
- 1. "Lionheart" Released: 8 September 2011; 2. "Royal Blood" Released: 30 December 2011; 3. "An Honourable Reign" Released: 21 May 2012; 4. "Knight Life" Released: 10 August 2012

The Union of Crowns is the second studio album by British metalcore band Bury Tomorrow. The album was released on 13 July 2012 through Nuclear Blast. It was produced by Antony Smith and Pedro Teixeira. It is also the last album to feature the band's founding lead guitarist Mehdi Vismara before he left the band in 2013. It was recorded within the first few months of 2012. The album's release was delayed several times by the band, in an attempt to find a record label who could provide international distribution simultaneously.

Upon release, the album received mixed to positive reception from critics. Whilst critics primarily praised the album's songwriting and its sonic progression from its predecessor, Portraits, negative criticism stemmed from the album's perceived lack of innovation within the metalcore genre, and an excessive length.

== Background and recording ==
The band left their independent labels Basick Records and Artery Recordings and spent a lot of time trying to find a label who wouldn't wish to compromise with the band on the sound of The Union of Crowns. The band were encouraged by Artery Recordings, their American label to move and base themselves in the United States but they refused as they had little experience in the country. After sending some instrumental demos of new songs to Nuclear Blast records, the band felt Nuclear Blast had a lot of faith in them. The whole goal of the album for the band was to rival the standards of American metalcore bands. Bass guitarist Davyd Winter-Bates commented on the album target for the album saying "Portraits was about us proving we could do metalcore as well as the Americans, and The Union of Crowns marks the first step towards us showing the world that we can do it as well as anyone."

== Composition ==
=== Influences, style and themes ===
The band's style is seen as metalcore, or more specifically "melodic metalcore". Their music features a contrast between melodic and aggressive vocal styles, intricate guitar riffs, clean-sung choruses and breakdowns. The album is seen as a showing a sonic evolution from the band's debut album, Portraits. Dani Winter-Bates when asked about the development from Portraits he said that "It's the same basic formula but we've all gotten better at our instruments." The band's sound will vary based on which vocalist takes the lead. Jason Cameron's "soulful" voice is matched by a melodic background, and is quickly contrasted by the chaos that surrounds Dani Winter-Bates aggressive growling.

Unlike their debut album, The Union of Crowns shows a melodic death metal influence, being comparable to As I Lay Dying. Lead vocalist Dani Winter-Bates, when asked how the music on the album sounds like he jokingly commented "basically if Michael Bolton joined Killswitch Engage." Furthermore, stating that the album is very similar to the works of Killswitch Engage and Parkway Drive. Both tracks "1603" and "A Curse" show progression beyond the band's typical sound experimenting with different instruments and song structures. "1603" uses a piano melody to open the track then guitar solo and melodic singing to guide the song. The album closer "A Curse" opens with a simple guitar riff, building to Jason's clean vocals and features no screaming vocals from Dani and closes with an "intense, powerful guitar solo."

The lyrics featured on the album talk about unification of England and Scotland and other themes of medieval society with a majority of the track names relating to royalty and medieval life. The purpose of the union as a theme was to represent the band's union with their fans.

== Release and promotion ==
The band both headlined a stage at Southampton based Takedown music festival and was the main support for Of Mice & Men on their April tour of the UK. In these dates, Bury Tomorrow debuted their two new singles, "Lionheart" and "Royal Blood", as well as two brand new songs off the album at these live shows. On 1 May 2012, Radio 1 host Daniel P. Carter debuted the band's third single for the album "An Honourable Reign". The music video for "An Honourable Reign" was filmed in Snowdonia with production company Sitcom Soldiers editing the footage. On 9 July, the band unveiled the second track from the album "The Maiden". This was debuted both on Alternative Press and Daniel P. Carter's BBC Radio 1 podcast The Rock Show. On 14 July, Bury Tomorrow released a typography styled music video for "The Maiden". On 4 September, the band released a music video for the track "Knight Life".

The album's release was delayed several times by the band in effort to find a record label to help distribute and promote the album. Initially projected to be released in May of that year but then was pushed further back to be planned for late June. By 2 April 2012, the announcement that Bury Tomorrow had been signed to Nuclear Blast Records came the announcement of its release dates, starting with 13 July for the European Union, 16 July for the United Kingdom and 17 July for the United States. Upon its British release, on 16 July 2012, the entire album was streamed on their AbsolutePunk profile exclusively. Upon the album's release the album debuted at number 6 on Rock & Metal Chart, number 11 on the Independent Chart, and number 3 on the Independent Breakers Chart. In the United States, the album peaked on 4 August 2012 at number 25 on the Top Heatseekers chart and sold 1,062 copies all in its first week. Ahead of the release of the album, the band has planned to support Architects in November in a tour round Britain alongside Deez Nuts and The Acacia Strain. This tour is wrapped round both Bury Tomorrow's and Architects' appearance at UK Warped Tour. In cooperation with Monster Energy, a B-Side from the album, titled "Darkest Regions", was released as a free downloadable track on 26 December 2012.

The fifth and last music video released was for "Sceptres", which was released on 21 August 2013 leading up to their performance at Reading and Leeds Festival in the UK. In November, the song "Sceptres" appeared on the Kerrang! rock chart at number 20. This chart is a combination of all of a songs presence on the Kerrang! radio and television schedule and official chart sales. The band then went on their first British Headline tour with Feed the Rhino, Empress and Heart in Hand. After this tour the band did a short six show tour of Austria in November.

== Critical reception ==
Professional ratings
Review scores
Source	Rating
AllMusic	4/5 stars
Alternative Press	2.5/5 stars
AltSounds	(89%)
Bloody Good Horror	(Favourable)
Dead Press!	9/10 stars
Examiner.com	(Favourable)
Rock Freaks	8.5/10
Sputnikmusic	4/5 stars
Thrash Hits	4.5/6

The album received generally positive reviews from critics, who primarily praised the album's song writing and sonic improvement from its predecessor. Bloody Good Horror in a pre-release review of the album gave a favourable assessment. Starting off the review stating "Bury Tomorrow doesn't reinvent the wheel on The Union of Crowns, but there are times when doing something well is its own form of progression." AltSounds writer Candice Haridimou gave the album a score of 89 out of 100. When talking about the track 'Royal Blood' she said "It's more than clear at this point that the band have the skill and the passion for making big music that makes a big impact, but their desire to grow is something that shines brightly above all. Its tracks like this that show they’re ready to take metal to a new level and that the goal doesn't always have to be tearing your face off."

Corey Hoffmeyer from Examiner.com credited the band for having a more concise and more creative album over their previous album, Portraits. Rock Freaks author Aleksi Pertola gave credit to singer Jason Cameron with both his vocal range and how the music was written to focus on his vocals. "Granted, the vast majority of the 14 songs do follow a rather traditional arrangement in terms of verse and chorus as a consequence. But when you've got such talent at your disposal, it would be foolish not to litter your songs with opportunities for Cameron to shine." Steven Spedding of Sputnikmusic credited their song writing and that they have found a formula that works for them saying "They have harnessed an ability to write more measured sections, where the aggression is toned down for tasteful instrumentals and this I feel is where they excel most." AllMusic writer Eduardo Rivadavia, in a four out of five star review praised the band for cohesively blending aggressive and melodic traits without sounding like polar extremes, further commenting "all this aggression always meshes judiciously with melodic counterpoints to maximum effectiveness."

Despite positive reviews, negative criticism stemmed from its lack of innovation and the album's sometimes considered excessive length. Spedding commented in his review Bury Tomorrow have "an obsession with padding out songs with breakdowns." Alternative Press writer Phil Freeman was very critical of the album, saying it "just isn't very interesting", further stating: "Nothing establishes Bury Tomorrow as a band with anything unique or surprising to offer—which puts them in exactly the same position they were in two years ago, when their first album, Portraits, was released." Hoffmeyer, despite an otherwise positive review described it as being "frequently plagued by the mediocrity that weighed Portraits down", also saying the album's lack of innovation is shown in their strong influence by other metalcore bands, saying 'Message to a King' is "basically a Parkway Drive song with clean vocals."

== Track listing ==
All tracks are written by Bury Tomorrow.

No.	Title	Length
1.	"Redeemer"	4:33
2.	"The Maiden"	4:38
3.	"Lionheart"	3:38
4.	"Message to a King"	3:49
5.	"An Honourable Reign"	3:59
6.	"Knight Life"	3:32
7.	"Royal Blood"	3:51
8.	"Bitemarks"	3:46
9.	"Abdication of Power"	4:21
10.	"Kingdom"	3:43
11.	"1603"	4:39
12.	"Sceptres"	3:23
13.	"Vacant Throne"	3:26
14.	"A Curse"	3:38
Total length:		54:49

B-Side Track
No.	Title	Length
15.	"Darkest Regions"	4:43
Total length:		59:32

== Personnel ==
Bury Tomorrow

- Dani Winter-Bates – unclean vocals
- Mehdi Vismara – lead guitar
- Jason Cameron – rhythm guitar, clean vocals
- Davyd Winter-Bates – bass
- Adam Jackson – drums, percussion

Additional personnel

- Antony Smith – engineering, production
- Pedro Teixeira – engineering, mixing, production
- Mike Curtis – engineering
- Jeff Dunne – editing
- Jamie Graham – management
- Beckie Sugden – booking
- Jacob Hansen – mastering
- Jaap Wagemaker – A&R
- Clinton Watts – editing

== Release history ==
Country	Date	Label	Format	Catalog number	Source
Europe	13 July 2012	Nuclear Blast	CD; Vinyl record	–	
United Kingdom	16 July 2012	Nuclear Blast	CD; Vinyl record	–	
United States	17 July 2012	Nuclear Blast	CD; Vinyl record	–	

== Charts ==
Chart (2012)	Peak position
UK Indie Albums Chart	11
UK Indie Breakers Chart	3
UK Rock & Metal Albums Chart	6
US Top Heatseekers	25
