= Waxwing (disambiguation) =

The waxwings are passerine birds classified in the genus Bombycilla.

Waxwing or Waxwings may also refer to:

- Waxwing (band), an American indie rock band
- Waxwing (rocket motor), British a solid rocket motor
- Waxwings (novel), a 2003 novel by Jonathan Raban
- The Waxwings, an American indie rock band

== See also ==
- Wax Wings (disambiguation)
