= Black Flame (album) =

Studio album by Bury Tomorrow
- Released: 13 July 2018
- Genre: Metalcore
- Length: 40:28
- Label: Music For Nations; Sony Music
- Producer: Dan Weller

Bury Tomorrow chronology
Earthbound (2016)	Black Flame (2018)	Cannibal (2020)

Singles from Black Flame
- 1. "Black Flame" Released: 13 April 2018; 2. "Knife of Gold" Released: 1 June 2018; 3. "The Age" Released: 29 June 2018; 4. "Glasswalk" Released: 14 June 2019

Deluxe edition album cover
- Artwork used for the deluxe edition album cover.

Black Flame is the fifth studio album by British metalcore band Bury Tomorrow. It was released on 13 July 2018 through Music For Nations and Sony Music. It was produced by Dan Weller.

== Background and promotion ==
On 27 October 2017, the band left Nuclear Blast and confirmed their signing with Sony Music and Music For Nations. During the months of October and November, the band headlined their "Stage Invasion" tour with metalcore band Loathe as their support act.

On 13 April 2018, the band released the lead single and title track "Black Flame" along with an accompanying music video. That same day, the band revealed the tracklist, album's official artwork and announced the album itself, which is the first to be distributed by the new labels. On 1 June, the band released the second single "Knife of Gold" and its corresponding music video. On 29 June, two weeks before the album release a music video for the song "The Age" and made it as the third and last single of the album.

On 14 June 2019, the band announced the deluxe edition of the album which contains the bonus track "Glasswalk" and live versions of three songs from the original album while also released the bonus track "Glasswalk" as a new single of the album.

== Critical reception ==
Professional ratings
Review scores
Source	Rating
Already Heard	4.5/5 stars
Dead Press!	9/10 stars
Distorted Sound	9/10
Exclaim!	7/10
KillYourStereo	75/100
Louder Sound	3.5/5 stars
Rock 'N' Load	9/10
Rock Sins	8/10

The album received mostly positive reviews from critics. Already Heard rated the album 4.5 out of 5 and said: "Black Flame is an undeniable step up for Bury Tomorrow, but also a record that points to the band's future ambitions. Its increased melodic death metal influence and electronic-led interludes point to a future in more mainstream metal songwriting. And while that might seem like a dreadful prospect to many listeners, let the confidence of this record remind you that Bury Tomorrow can readapt for bigger audiences without forgetting the ten years that took them up to this point." Zach Redrup from Dead Press! rated the album positively calling it: "Where Earthbound saw Bury Tomorrow treading along the line barely separating them from metalcore's finest, Black Flame shoves them right into the thick of and shoulder-to-shoulder with the genre's elite." Distorted Sound stated that "It's safe to say that BURY TOMORROW have surpassed themselves with Black Flame, and that their stock will go through the roof once it's out in the open for the world to hear. This is an absolutely superb album from one of the best bands to come out of the UK in recent years; long may their career continue."

Exclaim! rated the album 7 out of 10 and said: "This isn't the instant ticket to stardom Bury Tomorrow might have wanted. However, it does solidify them as major heavyweights in an overcrowded scene — sometimes that's enough. But if these gents want to skyrocket to the next level as their heroes have, they'll have to put a bit more of a unique stamp on their music. What's here is great, but inoffensive." Alex Sievers from KillYourStereo gave the album 75 out of 100 and said: "Black Flame is a summarization of everything good about Bury Tomorrow's sound; melody, mosh, malevolence and meticulousness. For a band that's been grinding for over ten years now, their fifth album feels like the genuine start of a new beginning; a new leaf being turned over. It doesn't at all redefine what metalcore or heavy music in the modern era can be or sound like, but that was never ever once the intent on the band's part. It's a record solely meant to push them forward, not necessarily their wider genre. For this is an album made for Bury Tomorrow themselves and for their fans first, everyone else second." Louder Sound gave the album a very positive review, but stated: "On the strength of Black Flame's best songs, Bury Tomorrow could very well join Architects and Bullet for My Valentine in the upper echelons of British metal, but they really need to step out of the shadow of Killswitch Engage and forge their own path. This is a huge step forward for Southampton's finest, but doesn't quite feel like the finished product."

Rock 'N' Load praised the album saying, "Heavy is heavy and melodic is sing along friendly as Black Flame creates a pivotal moment in the bands history and should easily push Bury Tomorrow in the direction that they are aiming. As the saying goes, there is no smoke without fire and this shows how hot Bury Tomorrow are." Sam Dignon of Rock Sins rated the album 8 out of 10 and said: "Black Flame is Bury Tomorrow trying their hardest to break through to that next level. It is their most ambitious effort to date and is up there with Earthbound as their best work. There is still room for the band to grow and hopefully they are able to develop what they've started here. There's always a lot of good will aimed at Bury Tomorrow so hopefully it all comes together this time."

== Track listing ==
No.	Title	Length
1.	"No Less Violent"	3:29
2.	"Adrenaline"	2:43
3.	"Black Flame"	5:15
4.	"My Revenge"	4:25
5.	"More Than Mortal"	5:31
6.	"Knife of Gold"	2:58
7.	"The Age"	3:33
8.	"Stormbringer"	3:14
9.	"Overcast"	5:07
10.	"Peacekeeper"	4:05
Total length:		40:28

Deluxe Edition bonus tracks
No.	Title	Length
11.	"Glasswalk"	3:49
12.	"Black Flame" (Live in London, UK)	4:00
13.	"No Less Violent" (Live in London, UK)	3:30
14.	"The Age" (Live in London, UK)	3:16
Total length:		55:04

== Personnel ==
Bury Tomorrow

- Daniel Winter-Bates – unclean vocals
- Jason Cameron – rhythm guitar, clean vocals
- Kristan Dawson – lead guitar, backing vocals
- Davyd Winter-Bates – bass
- Adam Jackson – drums, percussion

Additional personnel

- Dan Weller – production

== Charts ==
Chart (2018)	Peak position
Austrian Albums (Ö3 Austria)	45
German Albums (Offizielle Top 100)	19
Scottish Albums (OCC)	18
Swiss Albums (Schweizer Hitparade)	22
UK Albums (OCC)	21
UK Rock & Metal Albums (OCC)	2
US Heatseekers Albums (Billboard)	13
