= RIO (English band) =

English rock duo

- Origin: Hertfordshire, England
- Years active: 1982–1987
- Labels: Music for Nations; Elektra
- Members: Jon Neil and Steve Rodford

RIO were an English rock duo from Hertfordshire, England, formed by Jon Neil and Steve Rodford in 1982. Originally known as Bombay, the band released one single before changing their name to RIO. They recorded the albums Borderland (1985) and Sex Crimes (1986).

== History ==
RIO were formed in 1982 by Jon Neil (vocals and guitars) and Steve Rodford (keyboards, bass and drums). Initially using the name Bombay, the duo released a single, "Breaking the Rules", on Food for Thought Records in 1984, which featured Rodford's father, Jim Rodford, guesting on bass. The single received radio play in the UK and reached number four on the ILA Airplay Guide (Independent Labels Airplay Action) Top 15 in mid-June 1984. The interest from radio in the single resulted in the duo signing an album deal with Food for Thought Records' sister company Music for Nations in the UK and they subsequently changed their name to RIO after discovering that there was already an American band called Bombay.

RIO recorded their debut album, Borderland, at their own Liverpool Road Studios and completed it at Livingston Recording Studios. Borderland was released in the UK on 9 September 1985 by Music for Nations, and it was also released that month by Elektra Records in the US. The album spawned one single, "I Don't Wanna Be the Fool", which was released in the UK on 19 September 1985. Although it failed to chart, the single received airplay on US radio. In the UK, Borderland sold approximately 8,000 copies in the first three weeks of release. It reached number 19 in the Music Week Heavy Metal Top Albums chart in October 1985 and number 18 in the Music Week Heavy Metal Indie Metal LPs chart in December 1985. It received positive reviews, including from Paul Suter of Kerrang!, who awarded a rating of four and half stars out of five, calling it "undoubtedly the most impressive and mature LP to emerge from an indie rock label in this country" and one that is "destined for multiple platinum status in America".

Shortly after the release of Borderland, the duo expanded RIO to five members, with Pat MacDonald on guitar, Ross Griggs on keyboards and Martin Wightwick on drums, for some live work. For their second and final album, RIO, now reduced to a duo once again, adopted a heavier sound, with Neil describing it as "much ballsier" and "more guitar orientated" than their debut. As Elektra declined the option for a second album, Sex Crimes was recorded and released on a much smaller budget than Borderland. Music for Nations released a single, "Atlantic Radio", from the album on 14 July 1986, and Sex Crimes followed on 20 October 1986. Derek Oliver of Kerrang! gave a mixed review, noting that beyond the "most utterly pathetic sleeve" were four songs that "could sweep RIO into the American top 20" ("Danger Zone", "Dirty Movies", "Pay for Love" and "Atlantic Radio"). He concluded that the album "sounds fine at first, wilts a little with the next couple of spins and finally collapses beneath its own inadequacies third time around". Paul Elliott of Sounds, who awarded the album three and a half stars out of five, was highly critical of the sleeve, but noted the "snappy, rocking, even thunderous" LP was "altogether more tough, brash and feisty" than their debut.

After RIO were dropped by Music for Nations, Neil and Rodford continued working together as a duo, including under the name Big Talk, where they recorded a number of demos in circa 1987 and shopped them to various record companies. In 2021, RIO released a new song, "Long Way From Home", on YouTube.

In 2023, Borderland was remastered and reissued by MelodicRock Classics with four bonus tracks. Sex Crimes received the same treatment by the label in 2024 with three bonus tracks. The album was renamed Dangerzone and featured new artwork. Rodford recalled how the duo hated the artwork and title of the original 1986 release, which had been undertaken by a design team for Music for Nations without the duo's input.

== Discography ==
=== Albums ===
- Borderland (1985)
- Sex Crimes (1986)

=== Singles ===
- "I Don't Wanna Be the Fool" (1985)
- "Atlantic Radio" (1986)
