= X Is Loaded =

English rock band

- Origin: Bath, England
- Genres: Rock
- Years active: 2000–07
- Labels: Fierce Panda Records, Food Records, Bossmusic, Sugar Shack Records
- Past members: Jake (Phoenix) Robertson, Martino, Alex (Al) Cole, Jamie (the drummer) O'Gorman

X Is Loaded were a four-piece rock band from Bath, Somerset, England.

== Members ==
- Jake (Phoenix) Robertson - lead vocals, backing guitar
- Martino - lead guitar
- Alex (Al) Cole - bass
- Jamie (the drummer) O'Gorman - drums

== As Tenner ==
They released the single "Where Do You Come from" in June 2000 on Fierce Panda Records, and the EP single "Last Chance" in November 2000 on Food Records, under the moniker Tenner. After recruiting a new drummer, they decided to change their name. The name X Is Loaded was chosen as an amalgamation of several ideas, but the real reason is known only to the band.

== Releases and performances ==
They subsequently released the single "Massive Misguidance" with the label Bossmusic in August 2002.

They moved over to Music For Nations in early 2004, and released five singles as well as the album Raw Nerve.

Their March 2004 first single "Laugh, Point & Wave" on the Music for Nations label went to number 1 on the Kerrang! TV video chart, and they received a great deal of play on MTV2, Xfm, and BBC 6 Music. After touring with bands such as Biffy Clyro, Oceansize, InMe, Yourcodenameis:milo, Million Dead, and Hell is for Heroes they released their third single, Thirteen Days, in June 2004 and their debut album Raw Nerve in July. The album was critically acclaimed, receiving four K's and a very enthusiastic review in Kerrang!, as well as in other respected on and offline publications. In November 2004 the band released the download-exclusive single "Racketeer".

X is Loaded disbanded in 2006. Afterward, however, the band released a posthumous single "Momentum Fails" in March 2007, and a posthumous album Trench in April 2007, on Sugar Shack Records.

Some members went on to form new projects, including Martino's Bristol-based post-pop band Kill Cassidy.

== Discography ==
Singles

- Massive Misguidance (Bossmusic)
- Laugh, Point & Wave/The Start of Everything (Music for Nations)
- Thirteen Days (Music For Nations)
- Racketeer (Self released)
- Momentum Fails (Split 7") (Sugar Shack Records)

Albums

- Raw Nerve (Music For Nations)
- Trench (Sugar Shack Records)

== Associated bands ==
- Kill Cassidy Myspace page
