= Runes (album) =

Studio album by Bury Tomorrow
- Released: 26 May 2014
- Studio: CDS Studios, Chelmsford, Essex, UK
- Genre: Metalcore
- Length: 49:32
- Label: Nuclear Blast
- Producer: Mike Curtis

Bury Tomorrow chronology
The Union of Crowns (2012)	Runes (2014)	Earthbound (2016)

Singles from Runes
- 1. "Man on Fire" Released: 25 February 2014; 2. "Of Glory" Released: 13 May 2014

Runes is the third studio album by British metalcore band Bury Tomorrow. It was released on 26 May 2014 through Nuclear Blast and was produced by Mike Curtis. The album is named after the Rune Poems and is the band's first to feature Kristan Dawson, who replaced founding member Mehdi Vismara as Bury Tomorrow's lead guitarist in 2013. In June 2014, Runes reached number 34 on the UK charts and was also number 1 on the UK Rock Chart.

== Background and promotion ==
The band felt pressure during the recording of Runes in it being a follow-up to The Union of Crowns. At the end of the recording process Daniel Winter-Bates reflected positively on Runes saying that although this was the first time the band had recorded an album being a part of a record label, since he didn't think about it, it didn't affect his performance. He further noted the band thrives under the pressure of feeling alone in the process and pushing themselves.

The album's title Runes is derived from the Runic language system and the poems which describe each letters meaning.

The band's first song from the album, "Watcher" debuted on BBC Radio 1 late night Rock Show on 6 January 2014 and a few days later was made available to stream. Pre-orders became available on 20 February, and were announced on the band's official Facebook, along with bundle packs with other promotional material. They intend to release a regular and a bonus version of the album; the original will contain the 13 tracks, whilst the 'Bonus Version' will contain three exclusive tracks, along with a music video for the album's first single "Man on Fire" which was released on 25 February. The second single and music video was released on 13 May, for the song "Of Glory". The album was made available for exclusive streaming by Rock Sound on 21 May 2014.

== Composition ==
=== Style ===
Daniel Winter-Bates has commented that the record is "much heavier and faster than anything we've done before." However, he noted that because of the band's stylistic diversity they have room to incorporate heavier and lighter elements with ease.

Daniel Winter-Bates has commented that with the addition of Kristan Dawson the band was able to include much more technical guitar riffs into their style. The band had often referenced an affection for Killswitch Engage and As I Lay Dying and the influence these bands had on both Runes and the band as a whole. The band have gone as far to say they want to "fly the flag" for old school metalcore.

=== Themes ===
Dani Winter-Bates explains that each song on the album draws inspiration from a runic symbol. "Man on Fire" is explained to be about "...the struggle of humankind's sanity in an ever-changing world. The song itself is linked with the Rune for Man/Humankind and follows lyrically the ideas of a figure fighting their own thoughts and their fears getting the better of them." Mannaz (ᛗ) is the rune that represents "Man on Fire" as they sold shirts with that rune representing that song. When the second single "Of Glory" was released, Bates explained that the song "...is about making it through the struggles in life and disregarding naysayers and people that bring negativity."

Each rune is linked to a song, which according to the album track listing are:

- Mannaz (ᛗ) – "Man on Fire"
- Tiwaz (ᛏ) – "Shadow, a Creator"
- Kaunan (ᚲ) – "The Torch" & "The Torch" (acoustic)
- Algiz (ᛉ) – "Watcher" & "Watcher V.2"
- Gyfu (ᚷ) – "Our Gift"
- Laguz (ᛚ) – "Darker Water"
- Raido (ᚱ) – "Another Journey"
- Sowilō (ᛋ) – "Under the Sun"
- Jēran (ᛃ) – "Year of the Harvest"
- Berkanan (ᛒ) – "Garden of Thorns"
- Ansuz (ᚫ) – "Divine Breath"
- Wynn (ᚹ) – "Of Glory"
- Isaz (ᛁ) – "Last of the Ice"
- Haglaz (ᚺ) – "Hail the Lost"

== Critical reception ==
Professional ratings
Review scores
Source	Rating
About.com	4/5 stars
All About the Rock	9/10 stars
Already Heard	4.5/5 stars
Dead Press!	9/10
Louder Sound	3/5 stars
Rock Sins	6.5/10

The album received mostly positive reviews, but also mixed reviews from several critics. Writer for All About the Rock, Zack Slabbert said "If you're a metalcore fan then this is another album to add to your collection. It's filled with awesome breakdowns and the guitar riffs on this album are so catchy and get stuck in your head instantly." Already Heard rated the album 4.5 out of 5 and said: "It is a record that truly demonstrates why British metalcore is in the strong position it's currently in. Bury Tomorrow have confidently grown as a band on Runes, an album that is thoroughly compelling and powerful. It deserves all the praise it gets. Not an album to be ignored." Zach Redrup from Dead Press! rated the album positively calling it: "What is perhaps most thrilling with Runes is that the record plays entirely to the strengths of Bury Tomorrow and makes no attempt to progress too far from their established expertise. Fine tuning, sharpening and polishing, this is a release which through embracing the explosive power of metalcore done well, is inevitably bound to catapult Bury Tomorrow into the stratosphere. Heavyweights take note, these erstwhile upstarts are soon to stand tall beside you." Louder Sound gave the album a slightly negative review and stated: "At its worst, Runes feels nakedly derivative; Dani Winter-Bates's roar is a dead ringer for Parkway Drive's Winston McCall, while Jason Cameron's polite croon owes more than a little to Alexisonfire's Dallas Green. They are capable of richly textured, expressive metalcore but those moments feel few and far between here." Will Stevenson of Rock Sins rated the album 6.5 out of 10 and said: "Runes isn't a bad album; indeed, the songs themselves are all decent enough, and if you're already a fan of the band it's definitely worth a listen. Unfortunately, there are no mega choruses and no beatdowns that make you want to punch lions in the face, certainly not in the vein of The Union of Crowns. Put simply, there's just no 'Knight Life' on this album. In a world where Architects just released the superb Lost Forever // Lost Together, why would you spend your time on this generic effort?"

Following the album's success, Bury Tomorrow was nominated for Breakthrough Band of the Year at the 2015 Metal Hammer Golden Gods Awards, alongside Halestorm, In This Moment and The Amity Affliction, but lost out to Babymetal.

== Commercial performance ==
Runes entered the Official UK Chart at number 34. It debuted on the Official Rock Chart at number 1. The album also had success in the US, reaching number 16 on the Top Heatseekers chart.

== Track listing ==
All music is composed by Bury Tomorrow

No.	Title	Length
1.	"Man on Fire"	4:01
2.	"Shadow, a Creator"	4:39
3.	"The Torch"	4:14
4.	"Watcher"	4:44
5.	"Our Gift"	3:36
6.	"Darker Water"	3:19
7.	"Another Journey"	3:10
8.	"Under the Sun"	3:31
9.	"Year of the Harvest"	3:32
10.	"Garden of Thorns"	5:03
11.	"Divine Breath"	1:30
12.	"Of Glory"	4:32
13.	"Last of the Ice"	3:35
Total length:		49:32

Bonus Version
No.	Title	Length
14.	"Hail the Lost"	4:01
15.	"The Torch" (Acoustic)	3:25
16.	"Watcher V.2"	3:28
17.	"Man on Fire" (Music video)	3:57
Total length:		64:17

== Personnel ==
Bury Tomorrow

- Daniel Winter-Bates – unclean vocals
- Jason Cameron – rhythm guitar, clean vocals
- Kristan Dawson – lead guitar, backing vocals
- Davyd Winter-Bates – bass
- Adam Jackson – drums, percussion

Additional personnel

- Mike Curtis – production
- Will Putney – mixing

== Charts ==
Chart (2014)	Peak position
Belgian Albums (Ultratop Flanders)	192
UK Albums (OCC)	34
UK Rock & Metal Albums (OCC)	1
US Heatseekers Albums (Billboard)	16
