= Heart in Hand (band) =

English band

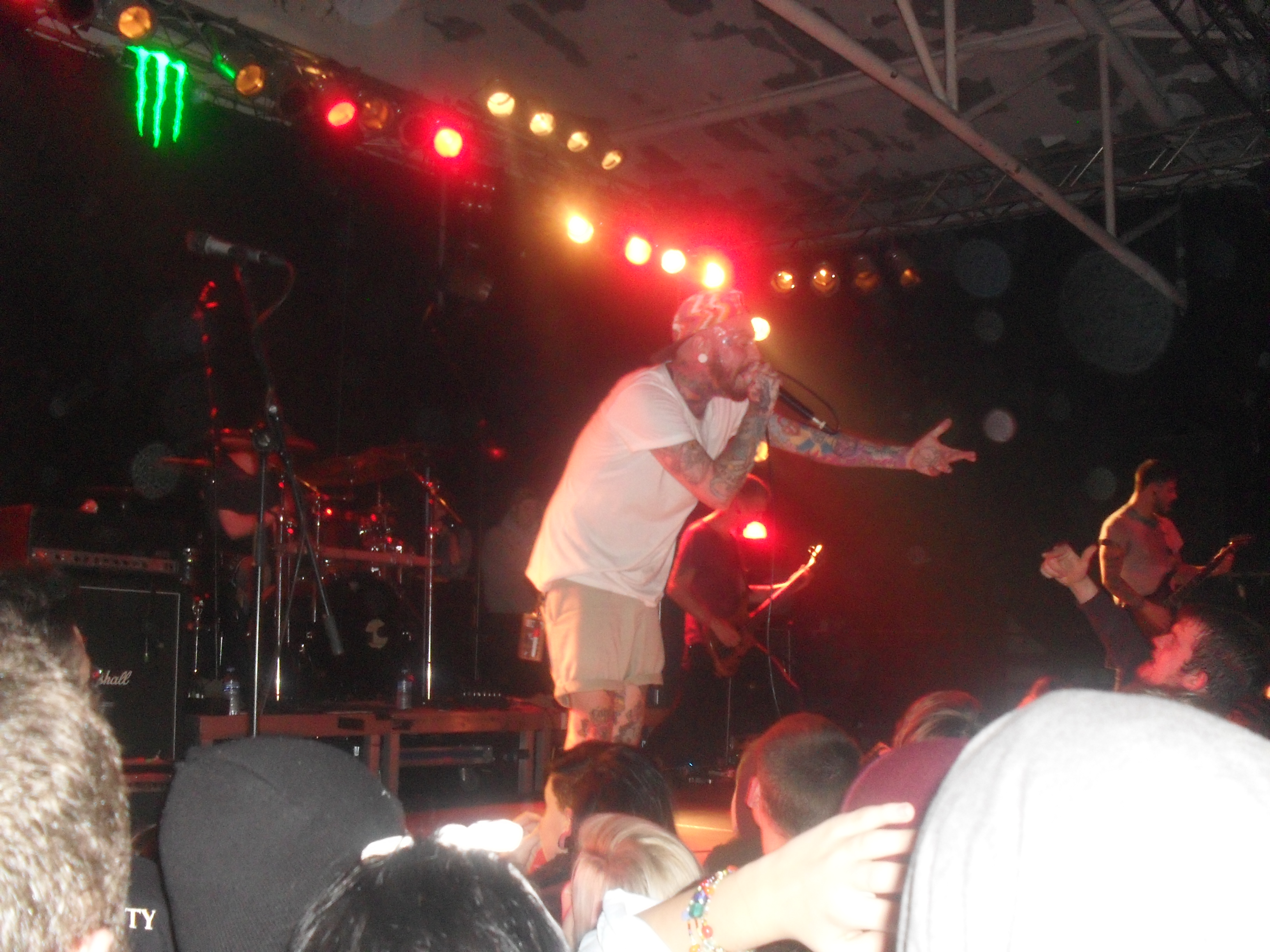
- Heart in Hand performing in Cologne in 2013

Background information
- Origin: Bournemouth, Dorset and Southampton, Hampshire, England, United Kingdom
- Genres: Melodic hardcore, metalcore
- Years active: 2008–2015
- Labels: Century Media, Siege of Amida
- Members: Charlie Holmes; Ed Hartwell; Ollie Wilson; Sam Brennan; Gavin Thane
- Past members: James Broderick; Nick Kendall; Carl Martin; Duncan Andrews

Heart in Hand were an English band from Bournemouth and Southampton, formed in 2008. Their musical style was a melodic blend of hardcore punk with heavy metal influences, described as both melodic hardcore and metalcore by reviewers. Their first release was the Heart in Hand EP in 2009, followed by 3 studio albums. The band's final lineup consisted of vocalist Charlie Holmes, guitarists Ed Hartwell and Ollie Wilson, bassist Gavin Thane and drummer Sam Brennan.

Heart in Hand had released 5 music videos with a combined view count of nearly 3 million before 2014. They supported the 2013 release of their second studio album, Almost There by touring with bands such as Bury Tomorrow, Deez Nuts, Miss May I, Stray from the Path and Texas in July. They had also appeared at numerous British festivals, including Download, Slam Dunk, 2000 Trees, Ghostfest and Redfest, as well as on the main stages of other European festivals such as Rock for People in the Czech Republic or Resurrection Fest in Spain, and as headliners at a number of smaller ones. They disbanded in February 2015.

== History ==
=== Formation, Heart in Hand EP and Only Memories (2008–2012) ===
The band was formed by vocalist Charles "Charlie" Holmes, shortly after he left death metal band Trigger the Bloodshed in August 2008, together with drummer Nick Kendall. They recruited their friends, guitarists Carl Martin and James Broderick, who in turn got their workmate, guitarist Edward "Ed" Hartwell, to join the band. Martin soon switched to bass, while Broderick left the band and was replaced by Hartwell's ex-bandmate Ollie Wilson. On 1 January 2009 Heart in Hand self-released their first record, the Heart in Hand EP, produced by Stu McKay (formerly of Eternal Lord). This was followed by their debut studio album Only Memories, released through Siege of Amida Records on 23 May 2011. Midway through the album's writing process in 2010, Kendall left the band for personal reasons and was replaced by Duncan Andrews from Bristol. Only Memories was praised as a "clever, highly-accomplished and refined hardcore record" by Tom Aylott of Rock Sound. Several guest vocalists appear on the album, including Ian Fike of It Prevails (with whom the band had toured prior to its release) on the song "Ghosts", and music videos have since been released for the title track, "Only Memories", as well as "Tunnels" and "Threefifteen". Andrews was dropped soon after the release and replaced by Samuel "Sam" Brennan, the founding drummer of The Eyes of a Traitor, whom Heart in Hand had also toured with and who went on hiatus in late 2011. Martin has also since left the band and was replaced by Gavin Thane.

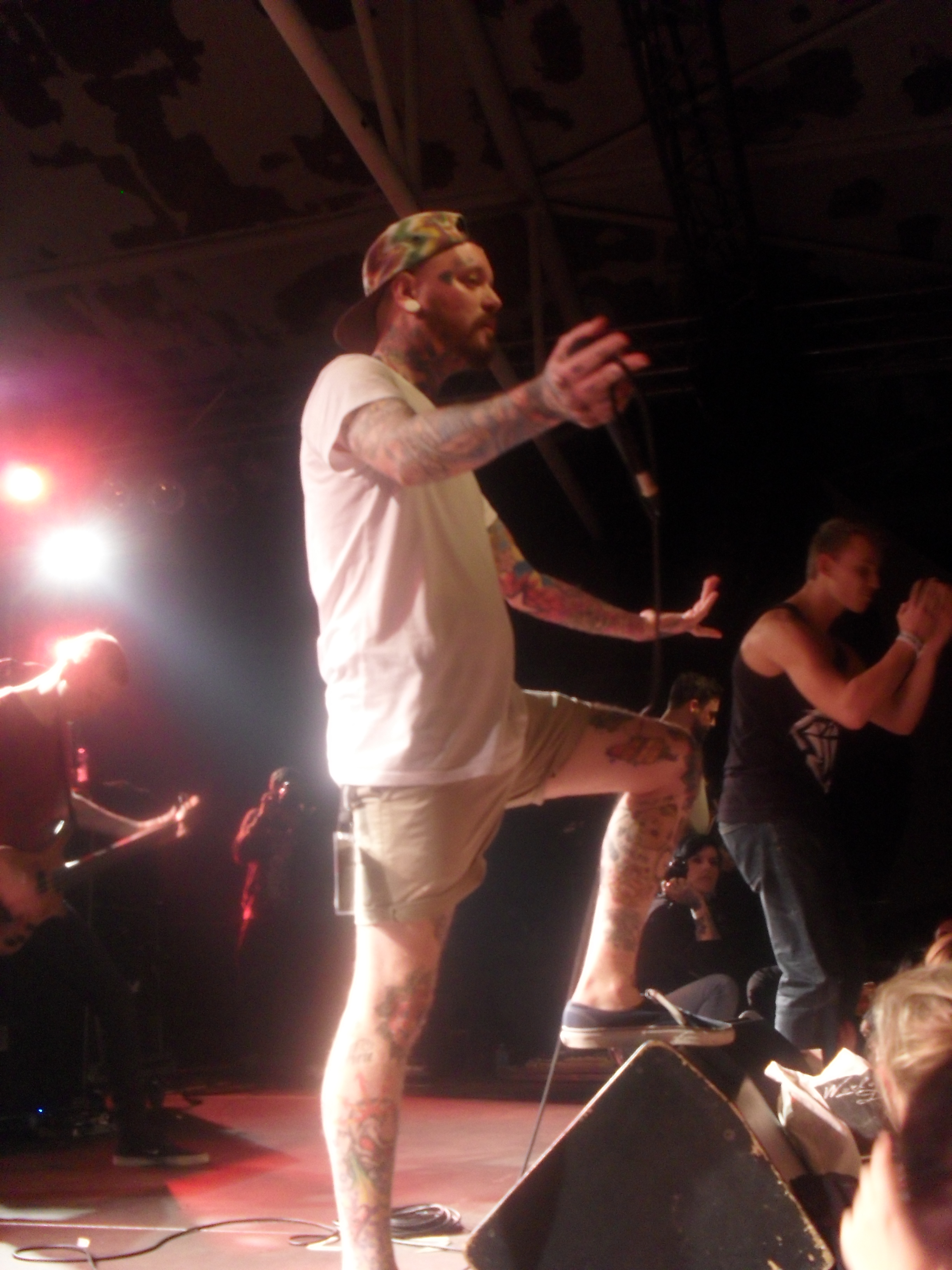
Charlie Holmes performing in 2013

=== Almost There, A Beautiful White and dissolution (2013–2015) ===
Heart in Hand's second studio album Almost There was released through Siege of Amida on 11 February 2013, featuring James Leatherbarrow of Death of an Artist on the song "Cuts and Bruises", Mikey Chapman and Sam Douglas of Mallory Knox on "Maybe" and Dani Winter-Bates of Bury Tomorrow on "Broken Lights". Music videos were released for "Life Goes On" and "Almost There", and the band supported the album's release by continuously touring with bands such as Bury Tomorrow, Deez Nuts, Miss May I, Stray from the Path and Texas in July across a total of 19 European countries, appearing at a number of festivals, including Rock for People in the Czech Republic and Resurrection Fest in Spain. Nik Young of Metal Hammer praised Almost There, writing: "Thanks to beautiful, melodic passages, euphoric songwriting, passionate vocals and crafty, bittersweet twists, Almost There is an exciting reminder that [Heart in Hand] play by no one’s rules but their own. Seeped in rage, frustration and hope, the album is well constructed and, thanks to producer Pedro Teixeira, it hits a perfect balance between the raw and the polished."

A Beautiful White is the band's last studio album, produced by Will Putney in New Jersey and released on 3 November 2014 in the United Kingdom and 4 November in the United States through Century Media Records, with a music video released for the title track, "A Beautiful White". The band described the album as having "more diversity than [their] previous releases" as they "tried different things musically as well as vocally" and Rob Sayce of Rock Sound reviewed it favorably, saying that "[with] sky-high tempos, delicate interludes and the odd moment of spine-tingling poignancy, [A Beautiful White] is more ambitious than your average melodic hardcore fare and all the better for it", while Nicholas Senior of New Noise Magazine said that "taking a step back and really evaluating [their] sound... allowed the band to fire on (almost) all cylinders". Heart in Hand also set out on a European tour with The Amity Affliction, Buried in Verona and Napoleon to support the album's release.

On 13 February 2015, Heart in Hand announced on their Facebook page that they have disbanded, cancelling their upcoming European tour, which was scheduled for March and April. They didn't provide a reason, but the post stated: "Trust is a hugely important part of any band and when it is tested it is difficult to come back from without causing further damage." They also wrote: "We will be toying about with music outside of this band in due time, but for now, this is the end for Heart In Hand." As of May 2015, Holmes had been accused of "sexual misconduct with minors" and the other members of the band provided no comment except that he had been "completely silent to all of [them] since way before [they] split". Ollie Wilson also shared new music they had made.

== Band members ==
Final lineup

- Charlie Holmes – vocals (2008–2015)
- Ed Hartwell – guitar (2008–2015) (currently in Bury Tomorrow)
- Ollie Wilson – guitar (2008–2015)
- Sam Brennan – drums (2011–2015)
- Gavin Thane – bass (2013–2015)

Past members

- James Broderick - guitar (2008)
- Nick Kendall – drums (2008–2010)
- Carl Martin – bass (2008–2013)
- Duncan Andrews – drums (2010–2011)

Timeline

== Discography ==
Studio albums

- Only Memories (2011)
- Almost There (2013)
- A Beautiful White (2014)

EPs

- Heart in Hand (2009)

== Videography ==
- Only Memories
  - "Only Memories" (2011)
  - "Tunnels" (2012)
  - "Threefifteen" (2012)
- Almost There
  - "Life Goes On" (2013)
  - "Almost There" (2013)
- A Beautiful White
  - "A Beautiful White" (2014)
