= Portraits (Bury Tomorrow album) =

Studio album by Bury Tomorrow
- Released: 12 October 2009
- Genre: Melodic metalcore
- Length: 56:04
- Label: Basick; Artery
- Producer: Weller Hill

Bury Tomorrow chronology
The Sleep of the Innocents (2007)	Portraits (2009)	The Union of Crowns (2012)

Singles from Portraits
- 1. "Her Bones in the Sand" Released: 9 September 2008; 2. "Casting Shapes" Released: 16 September 2008; 3. "You & I" Released: 3 November 2009

Portraits is the debut studio album by British metalcore band Bury Tomorrow. The album was released first in the United Kingdom through Basick Records on 12 October 2009. It was produced by Weller Hill. Adam Jackson has stated it was named Portraits for two reasons: "Firstly, the title track is based on the story of Dorian Gray by Oscar Wilde, a cautionary tale of the beauty and frailty of life. Secondly, Portraits depicts a person or character frozen in time as they were at a given moment. This is how we see this album – it's a reflection of our tastes, loves, hates, losses and gains. It's a memory in musical form, the first glimpse of the picture that is Bury Tomorrow."

== Release and promotion ==
The album was released first in the United Kingdom through Basick Records on 12 October 2009 while it was released through Artery Recordings in March 2010 in Japan and the United States. The American version of the album featured both an alternate album art and an extended track listing with three bonus tracks: "Waxed Wings", "The Western Front" and "Breathe on Glass". These three tracks were released in the United Kingdom as an extended play titled On Waxed Wings.

Two music videos were shot to accompany the release of Portraits. The first music video was for "Her Bones in the Sand" was released on 9 September 2008, a year prior to the release of the album. The music video for "You & I" was recorded at Southampton Solent University and featured Bury Tomorrow performing to 200 fans, the video was shot over the course of two days, with the second day focusing on the band performing. "You & I" was broastcasted on MTV2 in the United States, Scuzz in the United Kingdom and on Much Music in Canada.

In an interview with Dead Press! in April 2017, frontman Dani Winter-Bates disclosed that they plan to celebrate the album's tenth anniversary in some way once it comes about in 2019.

== Critical reception ==
Professional ratings
Review scores
Source	Rating
AbsolutePunk	71%
AllMusic	3/5 stars
Alternative Press	3/5 stars
The New Review	5/5 stars
Rock Freaks	8.5/10
Sputnikmusic	3/5 stars

Portraits received positive reviews from music critics. AllMusic gave the album a positive review, but saying: "Portraits isn't a five-star treasure, but it is still a cut above many of the screamo/post-hardcore/melodic hardcore releases of the late 2000s/early 2010s." Phil Freeman of Alternative Press gave the album a 3 out of 5 stars, saying: "If you're wondering whether they bring anything unique or unexpected to the table, the answer is no. Is Portraits a pleasurable enough melodic metalcore album while it's playing? Absolutely." Rock Freaks gave the album 8.5/10 and stated: "And yet it does not feel like plagiarism, but rather, like the coming together of influences that have then been channeled into writing songs that Bury Tomorrow can be proud to call their own. With Portraits, Bury Tomorrow have written metalcore the way it was meant to be written: simple and devoid of too many frills, and all about the sing-alongs and fantastic live performances. In fact, the lyrics in 'Factory of Embers' summarize this fine debut in a way no other words could: 'We will rise against the odds to prevail and to defeat!'"

== Track listing ==
All tracks are written by Bury Tomorrow

No.	Title	Length
1.	"Confessions"	5:11
2.	"Evolution of Self"	3:34
3.	"You & I"	3:27
4.	"Her Bones in the Sand"	4:12
5.	"Repair the Lining"	2:53
6.	"Casting Shapes"	3:31
7.	"Factory of Embers"	4:16
8.	"Relief"	2:42
9.	"Anything with Teeth"	3:36
10.	"These Woods Aren't Safe for Us"	4:53
11.	"Portraits"	5:42
12.	"Waxed Wings" (American edition bonus track)	4:37
13.	"The Western Front" (American edition bonus track)	3:47
14.	"Breathe on Glass" (American edition bonus track)	3:37
Total length:		56:04

== Personnel ==
Bury Tomorrow

- Dani Winter-Bates – unclean vocals
- Mehdi Vismara – lead guitar
- Jason Cameron – rhythm guitar, clean vocals
- Davyd Winter-Bates – bass
- Adam Jackson – drums, percussion

Additional personnel

- Weller Hill – production, mixing
- Colin Marks – artwork
