= Napoleon (band) =

English metalcore band

- Origin: Exeter, England
- Genres: Progressive metalcore; melodic hardcore; metalcore
- Years active: 2011–2019
- Label: Basick
- Past members: Wesley Thompson; Sam Osborn; Jacob Brelsford; Joshua Baker; Joseph Godfree; Christopher Adams; Ryan McEntee; Alex Feggi; James Mendoza

Napoleon was an English metalcore band from Exeter, England formed in 2011.

On 3 February 2019, the band announced their decision to part ways as band with one final two week European tour.

"Today we come with some news. After 9 years as a band we’ve collectively decided it’s time to call it a day. This decision has not been made with ease, but where we are as individuals it is one that makes sense. During these years we’ve had the time of our lives and all share memories we’ll never forget. We got to explore the world and share our music with as many people as possible and we’ll look back on the memories with great fondness. This is 100% down to you guys. You have supported us through everything and for that we are incredibly thankful and it will always mean the world to us. Thank you to anyone that has helped us out in some way or another, we couldn’t of done it without you. We will be ending our career as a band with a two week European tour. We hope to see everyone that’s supported us throughout the years come to a show and make the last tour the best one we’ve ever done!"

-Napoleon 2011-2019

== Musical style ==
Napoleon have been categorised as melodic hardcore, progressive metalcore, metalcore, hardcore punk, technical hardcore and "melodic hardcore for prog kids or vice versa". They are also self-described as melodiposipassiongroove.

They have cited influences including Dead Swans, Northlane, Trivium, Bullet for My Valentine, Pantera, Intervals and TTNG.

They have been cited as an influence by Currents.

== Band members ==
=== Final line-up ===
- Sam Osborn – guitar (2011–2019)
- James Mendoza – drums (2011–2019)
- Jacob Brelsford – bass (2014–2019)
- Wesley Thompson – lead vocals (2015–2019)

=== Former ===
- Joseph Godfree – bass (2011–2012)
- Joshua Baker – lead vocals (2012–2013)
- Christopher Adams – bass (2011–2013)
- Ryan McEntee – bass (2013–2014)
- Alex Feggi – lead vocals (2013–2014)

== Discography ==
=== Studio albums ===
- Newborn Mind (2016)
- Epiphany (2018)

=== EPs ===
- What We See (2012)
- Cinderella (2011)
