= Music for Nations =

British independent record label

- Parent company: Sony Music Entertainment (SME)
- Founded: 1983; 43 years ago (original); 2015; 11 years ago (relaunch)
- Founder: Martin Hooker
- Defunct: 2004 (original)
- Distributors: The Orchard (United States); Sony Music UK (United Kingdom); Sony Music (International)
- Genre: Heavy metal, doom metal, speed metal, thrash metal, glam metal
- Country of origin: United Kingdom
- Location: London, England
- Official website: musicfornations.co.uk

Music for Nations (MFN) is a British independent record label focusing mainly on rock and metal. Originally a subsidiary of Zomba Records, which was a division of BMG, the label was closed in 2004 and later revived in 2015 by Sony Music Entertainment.

Launched in 1983 by Martin Hooker, Music for Nations established itself as a European leader in the rock and metal world, with early signings like Tank, Exciter, Metallica (who had three gold albums while on MFN), Slayer and Megadeth paving the way. As MFN grew, the company expanded its operation to include not just licensed acts from the United States, but its own signings. It released albums by artists including Paradise Lost, Opeth, Anathema, Cradle of Filth, Testament and countless other metal bands. As well as the traditional metal bands MFN went on to sign up and coming UK bands such as Tigertailz who had a top 40 album while signed to Music for Nations.

In 2004, the label closed down. The company's catalogue – which had also previously included titles from artists as varied as Lost Horizon, Tigertailz and Frank Zappa – was transferred to parent company Zomba Records Group. In December 2011, The End Records signed a distribution deal for 50 of MFN's catalog albums.

In February 2015, MFN relaunched through Sony's commercial department, with plans to reissue albums from their catalogue including Anathema, Paradise Lost, Opeth, Spiritual Beggars, Cradle of Filth and others. They also intend to, in the spirit of the label's original purpose, sign original heavy talent for singles, EPs and compilation albums.

In October 2017, MFN signed two newcomers, metalcore band Bury Tomorrow and ambient rock band Blanket. In June 2018, American metalcore band Killswitch Engage joined MFN's UK roster; the band's forthcoming album will be marketed by Metal Blade Records in the United States, and internationally through Columbia/Sony.

== Roster ==
- Acid Drinkers (1990–1992) (Subsidiary label – Under One Flag)
- Agent Steel
- Alaska
- Amplifier
- Anathema
- Anthem
- Anthrax
- Apes, Pigs & Spacemen
- Apocalypse
- Astroid Boys (Subsidiary label – Under One Flag)
- Baby Tuckoo
- Battleaxe
- Bury Tomorrow
- The Beyond
- Candlemass
- Chrome Molly
- Cradle of Filth
- Creation of Death (1991–1992) (Subsidiary label – Under One Flag)
- Darkmoon
- Dispatched
- Dead Potatoes (2003–2006)
- Dearly Beheaded (1995–1998)
- Dragon (1990–1991) (Subsidiary label – Under One Flag)
- Drive She Said
- Earthshaker
- Entombed
- Exciter
- Exodus
- The Exploited (Subsidiary label – Rough Justice)
- Freak of Nature
- Godflesh
- Hed PE
- Hellion
- Helstar
- Hot Milk
- InMe
- Killswitch Engage
- Juster
- Legs Diamond
- Lost Horizon
- Loudness
- Lowfive
- Manowar
- Eric Martin
- Maruja
- Meanstreak
- Megadeth
- Mercyful Fate
- Metallica
- Mike Tramp
- Milk Teeth
- Mindfunk
- Nightshade
- Nuclear Assault
- Onslaught
- Opeth
- Paradise Lost
- Simon Phillips
- Porcupine Tree (2021-present)
- Q5
- Ratt
- RIO
- The Rods
- Rogue Male
- Rox
- Sarcófago
- Savatage
- Sirrah (1995–1999)
- Spiritual Beggars
- Jack Starr
- SugarComa (2001–2003)
- Sugarcreek
- Suicide Squad
- Surgin
- Tank
- Testament
- Thrasher
- Tigertailz (1990–2005)
- TKO
- Tyketto
- Turbo (1990–1991) (Subsidiary label – Under One Flag)
- Robin Trower
- Twelfth Night
- Tygers of Pan Tang
- Venom (1989–1992) (Subsidiary label – Under One Flag)
- Virgin Steele
- W.A.S.P.
- Wolf Spider (1990–1991) (Subsidiary label – Under One Flag)
- Waysted
- Wendy O. Williams
- XisLoaded

== See also ==
- Lists of record labels
