= Heavy Music Awards =

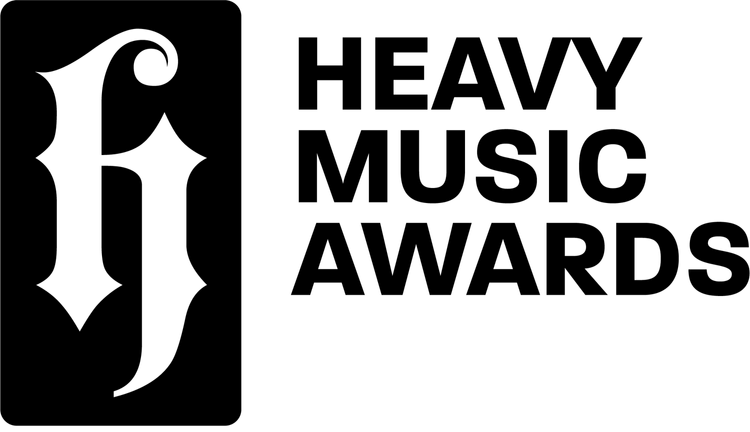
- Awarded for: Outstanding achievements in heavy music
- Country: United Kingdom
- Presented by: The Heavy Group
- First award: 24 August 2017; 9 years ago
- Website: heavymusicawards.com

Television/radio coverage
- Network: Scuzz (2017); Twitch (2020–2021)

The Heavy Music Awards (HMAs) are awards presented by The Heavy Group to recognize outstanding achievements in heavy music. It operates as both an annual awards ceremony and a live event. The first ceremony was held on 24 August 2017. Whilst its nominees are selected from a panel of people involved in the heavy metal scene, its winners are selected by an online vote.

The Heavy Music Awards (HMAs) is an annual event celebrating the best in rock, metal, and alternative music. Founded in 2017, the HMAs recognize artists, bands, producers, and other industry professionals through various award categories. The event is organized by the Heavy Group, a media company focusing on heavy music.

== History ==
The Heavy Music Awards were conceived in late 2016 by Dave Bradley and Andy Pritchard, and announced on 1 March 2017 by their joint venture The Heavy Group. Pritchard has stated that they set up the awards with the intention of "[treating] heavy music as a legitimate art form", with the hopes that the event would offer increased recognition and exposure for those involved in the scene/genre. The inaugural Heavy Music Awards ceremony, held on 24 August 2017 at the House of Vans in London, received 97,000 votes. The ceremony was broadcast on the British TV channel Scuzz on 16 September 2017. The 2018 edition, which took place on 22 August 2018 at KOKO in London, received 131,000 votes. The 2019 ceremony took place at the larger O2 Forum Kentish Town and was hosted by Laura Jane Grace of Against Me!.

In November 2019, the Heavy Music Awards moved its annual date from August to May. The Heavy Music Awards 2020 was due to take place on 21 May 2020. Due to the COVID-19 pandemic lockdowns, it was instead livestreamed on the Amazon Music UK Twitch channel on 3 September 2020, with its ceremony and live performers being filmed in differing locations. The ceremony drew in 150,000 votes and was watched by 177,000 people online. The 2021 edition Heavy Music Awards was held as both an in-person event (at the O2 Forum Kentish Town) and a livestream, and saw a sharp increase in voters; between 16 June and 14 July 2021, the awards finalists collectively received over 1.4 million votes. The livestream was shut down by Twitch after Milkie Way of Wargasm suffered a wardrobe malfunction that exposed her nipples whilst performing onstage with Trash Boat, leading the Heavy Music Awards channel to be struck for nudity and suspended for three days. Way refused to apologize for the incident, whilst Trash Boat vocalist Tobi Duncan accused Twitch of using a double standard, as both musicians were wearing outfits that exposed their nipples during the performance.

The 2023 edition was hosted at the OVO Arena Wembley, drawing in a crowd of 5,000 and receiving over 1.3 million votes from people in 161 countries. The 2025 edition was due to take place at O2 Forum Kentish Town; two weeks before it was due to take place, the in-person ceremony was cancelled owing to health issues, and its winners were instead announced on Kerrang! Radio in October.

== Awards process ==
Nominees are selected for the Heavy Music Awards from a panel of people involved in the heavy music industry, from the UK and internationally. They are invited to list their top three albums for any given category, given it has been released in the previous year (between 1 January and 31 December) and fits specific criteria. The HMA has no say in selecting its finalists. The top 7 artists in each category are then listed as finalists that are voted on by the general public on the Heavy Music Awards website. Its trophies are manufactured by Gaudio Awards.

The Heavy Music Awards 2017 had an panel size of 300+ personnel, which has been expanded upon with its subsequent editions. (Note: Heavy Music Awards panel size: 2017: 308; 2018: approx. 400; 2019: approx. 600; 2021/2022: approx. 700; Since 2023: approx. 1,000) The panel for the Heavy Music Awards 2024 is made up of almost 1,000 personnel.

== List of ceremonies ==
Year	Date	Venue	Host city	Host(s)	Performers	Ref.
2017	24 August	House of Vans	London	Alex Baker and Sophie K	Creeper, Venom Prison, Vukovi, Dead!	
2018	23 August	KOKO	London	Sophie K	Fever 333, Milk Teeth, Black Peaks, Coldbones	
2019	22 August	O2 Forum Kentish Town	London	Laura Jane Grace	Cancer Bats, Loathe, Nova Twins, Delaire the Liar	
2020	3 September	Twitch (livestream); HMA's Offices (awards); Afterlive Music (performances)	London	Sophie K and Jon Mahon	The Hunna, Holding Absence, Heart of a Coward, Wargasm, Coldbones, Hawxx	
2021	2 September	O2 Forum Kentish Town	London	Alex Baker	Sleep Token, Trash Boat, Hot Milk, As Everything Unfolds	
2022	5 June	O2 Forum Kentish Town	London	Alex Baker	Beartooth, Holding Absence, Meet Me @ The Altar, Static Dress	
2023	26 May	OVO Arena Wembley	London	Alex Baker, Alyx Holcombe and Nels Hylton	Boston Manor, Creeper, Lzzy Hale & Joe Hottinger (Unplugged ft. Sophie Lloyd), Underoath, Vukovi ft. Scene Queen	
2024	22 August	O2 Forum Kentish Town	London	Alex Baker	Neck Deep, Casey, Graphic Nature, Unpeople	
2025	4 October	Kerrang! Radio	N/A	Alex Baker	N/A	
2026	11 July	Kerrang! Radio	N/A	Alex Baker	N/A	

== Award categories ==
=== Voted categories ===
As of the Heavy Music Awards 2024, nominees can win in the following categories:

- Best Album
- Best Breakthrough Album
- Best UK Artist (awarded as Best UK band from 2017 to 2021)
- Best UK Live Artist
- Best International Artist (awarded as Best International Band from 2017 to 2021)
- Best International Live Artist
- Best Breakthrough Live Artist
- Best UK Breakthrough Artist (awarded as Best UK Breakthrough Band from 2017 to 2022)
- Best International Breakthrough Artist (awarded as Best International Breakthrough Band from 2017 to 2022)
- Best Album Artwork

=== Non-voted categories ===
- The H (awarded for "exceptional positive contribution to the heavy music scene")
- Pioneer (awarded for "groundbreaking approach to artistry and presentation")
- Icon (presented for "exceptional long-standing positive contribution to the heavy music scene")

=== Retired categories ===
- Best Photographer (2017 to 2020)
- Best Live Band (2017 to 2020), Best Live Artist (2021 to 2022)
- Best Festival (2017 to 2023)
- Best Production (2017 to 2023) (awarded as Best Producer from 2017 to 2020)
- Best Video (2020 to 2023)
- Best Podcast (2021 to 2022)
- Best Single (2021 to 2023)

=== One-off categories ===
- Best Breakthrough Band (2017)
- Best Venue (2017)
- Innovation Award (2022) (awarded for "innovative application of new ideas for the greater good of the heavy music scene")

== List of Heavy Music Awards winners and nominees ==
Winners are listed first and highlighted in bold.

=== 2017 ===
The H award was posthumously given to Kerrang! photographer Ashley Maile, and was accepted by on his behalf by his wife Caroline, sister Carly and friend Paul Harries.

Best Album	Best UK Band
**All Our Gods Have Abandoned Us – Architects**; Gore – Deftones; Low Teens – Every Time I Die; Magma – Gojira; Hardwired... to Self-Destruct – Metallica; Rheia – Oathbreaker	**Black Sabbath**; Architects; Biffy Clyro; Black Peaks; Bring Me the Horizon; Creeper; Frank Carter & The Rattlesnakes
Best Live Band	Best International Band
**Enter Shikari**; Architects; The Dillinger Escape Plan; Every Time I Die; Frank Carter & The Rattlesnakes; Ghost; Gojira	**Gojira**; A Day to Remember; Beartooth; Deftones; Every Time I Die; Ghost; Metallica
Best Photographer	Best Album Artwork
**Ben Gibson**; Tom Barnes; Corrine Cumming; Ross Halfin; Paul Harries; Jennifer McCord; John McMurtie	**Popestar – Ghost**; All Our Gods Have Abandoned Us – Architects; I'm Not Well – Black Foxxes; Gore – Deftones; Magma – Gojira; The Violent Sleep of Reason – Meshuggah; Sorceress – Opeth
Best Breakthrough Band	Best Festival
**I Prevail**; Black Peaks; Black Foxxes; Casey; Dead!; Venom Prison; Zeal & Ardor	**Download**; 2000trees; ArcTanGent; Bloodstock Open Air; Desertfest; Reading & Leeds; Slam Dunk
Best Producer	Best Venue
**Fredrik Noström & Henrik Udd**; Tom Dalgety; John Feldmann; Greg Fidelman; Matt Hyde; Dan Lancaster; Will Putney	**O2 Academy, Brixton**; Black Heart, Camden; The Dome, Tufnell Park; KOKO, Camden; O2 Forum, Kentish Town; The Underworld, Camden
The H
**Ashley Maile**

=== 2018 ===
Best Album	Best UK Band
**You Are We – While She Sleeps**; Forever – Code Orange; The Dusk in Us – Converge; Eternity, In Your Arms – Creeper; The Spark – Enter Shikari; Emperor of Sand – Mastodon; After the Party – The Menzingers	**Architects**; Arcane Roots; Creeper; Enter Shikari; Frank Carter & the Rattlesnakes; Marmozets; While She Sleeps
Best Live Band	Best International Band
**Gojira**; Architects; Enter Shikari; Every Time I Die; Frank Carter & the Rattlesnakes; Ghost; While She Sleeps	**Metallica**; Code Orange; Converge; Mastodon; The Mezingers; Parkway Drive; Trivium
Best Photographer	Best UK Breakthrough Band
**Ed Mason**; Corrine Cumming; Ben Gibson; Joshua Halling; Paul Harries; Tina Korhonen; Jennifer McCord	**Milk Teeth**; Bad Sign; Conjurer; Employed to Serve; Holding Absence; Loathe; Venom Prison
Best Album Artwork	Best International Breakthrough Band
**The Future in Whose Eyes? –** **Sikth (Meats Meier)**; Mirror Reaper – Bell Witch (Mariusz Lewandowski); The Dusk in Us – Converge (Jacob Bannon); Eternity, In Your Arms – Creeper (Nicky Barkla); Modern Ruin – Frank Carter & The Rattlesnakes (Dean Richardson/Studio Yuck); Emperor of Sand – Matsodon (Donny Phillips); Mesmer – Northlane (Jacques Duquette/Fvckrender)	**Knocked Loose**; Brutus; Can't Swim; Palaye Royale; Slotface; Stand Atlantic; Waterparks
Best Festival	Best Producer
**Hellfest Open Air**; 2000trees; ArcTanGent; Bloodstock Open Air; Download Festival; Slam Dunk; UK Tech Fest	**Will Putney**; Kurt Ballou; Romesh Dodangoda; Neil D. Kennedy; Dan Lancaster; Brendan O'Brien; Will Yip
The H
The Sophie Lancaster Foundation

=== 2019 ===
The H Award was given to the Dixon family. According to MMH News, the family "are revered on the live circuit for selflessly offering accommodation to bands touring the north east [of England] for many years."

Best Album	Best UK Band
**Holy Hell – Architects**; All That Divides – Black Peaks; Prequelle – Ghost; Joy as an Act of Resistance – Idles; Firepower – Judas Priest; Reverence – Parkway Drive; Time & Space – Turnstile	**Bring Me the Horizon**; Architects; Black Peaks; Enter Shikari; Iron Maiden; Judas Priest; While She Sleeps
Best Live Band	Best International Band
**Architects**; Bring Me the Horizon; Enter Shikari; Fever 333; Ghost; Parkway Drive; Slayer	**Parkway Drive**; Beartooth; Behemoth; Ghost; Halestorm; Turnstile; Twenty One Pilots
Best Photographer	Best UK Breakthrough Band
**Paul Harries**; Derek Bremer; Thomas Lisle Coe-Brooker; Corrine Cumming; Jennifer McCord; Tom Pullen; Ester Segarra	**Dream State**; Conjurer; Holding Absence; Parting Gift; Puppy; Sleep Token; Yonaka
Album Artwork	Best International Breakthrough Band
**Prequelle – Ghost (Zbigniew M. Bielak)**; Holy Hell – Architects (Dan Hillier); I Loved You At Your Darkest – Behemoth (Nicola Samori); Welcome to the Neighborhood – Boston Manor (Josh Halling & Martin Ruffin); Gravity – Bullet for My Valentine (Daniel Holub); Technology – Don Broco (Charlotte Smith); Firepower – Judas Priest (Claudio Bergamin)	**Fever 333**; Alien Weaponry; Bad Wolves; Møl; Pagan; The Faim; Vein
Best Festival	Best Producer
**Bloodstock Open Air**; 2000trees; ArcTanGent; Download; Hellfest Open Air; Slam Dunk; Wacken Open Air	**Dan Weller**; Tom Dalgety; Romesh Dodangoda; Lewis Johns; Nick Raskulinecz; Andy Sneap; Will Yip
The H
**The Dixon Family**

=== 2020 ===
Bring Me the Horizon, Slipknot and Rammstein all had four nominations each. Catherine Marks and Ester Segarra became the first women to win in each of their respective categories, for Best Producer and Best Photographer. The H Award was given to Dom Fraiser and Space, owners of the Boileroom venue in Guildford. Space also produced Idles' Joy as an Act of Resistance.

Best Album	Best UK Band
**We Are Not Your Kind – Slipknot**; Metal Galaxy – Babymetal; Celebrity Mansions – Dinasour Pile-Up; Sundowning – Sleep Token; Fear Inoculum – Tool; So What? – While She Sleeps	**Bring Me the Horizon**; Architects; Bury Tomorrow; Employed to Serve; Frank Carter & The Rattlesnakes; Venom Prison; While She Sleeps
Best Live Band	Best International Band
**Rammstein**; Amon Amarth; Behemoth; Brutus; Fever 333; Parkway Drive; Slipknot	**Slipknot**; Fever 333; The Interrupters; Parkway Drive; Rammstein; Stray From the Path; Tool
Best Photographer	Best UK Breakthrough Band
**Ester Segarra**; Sarah Louise Bennet; Corinne Cumming; Paul Harries; Jennifer McCord; Jake Owens; Sabrina Ramdoyal	**Nova Twins**; Cold Years; Higher Power; Hot Milk; Ithaca; Pengshui
Best Video	Best Album Artwork
**"Action" – Don Broco (dir. Benjamin Roberds)**; "In the Dark" – Bring Me the Horizon (dir. Oli Sykes); "Born Cold" – Creeper (dir. Oscar Sansom); "Stop the Clocks" – Enter Shikari (dir. Polygon); "Scary Mask" – Poppy ft. Fever 333 (dir. Titanic Sinclair); "Deutschland" – Rammstein (dir. Specter Berlin); "Unsainted" – Slipknot (dir. Shawn Crahan)	**Gold & Grey – Baroness (John Dyer Baizley)**; Hidden History of the Human Race – Blood Incantation (Bruce Pennington); amo – Bring Me the Horizon (Darren Oorloff); The Nothing – Korn (Tension Division); Rammstein – Rammstein (Jes Larson); Samsara – Venom Prison (Eliran Kantor)
Best International Breakthrough Band	Best Festival
**Polaris**; The Hu; Jesus Piece; Simple Creatures; SKYND; Stand Atlantic; Thornhill	**Download**; 2000trees; ArcTanGent; Bloodstock Open Air; Hellfest Open Air; Roadburn; Slam Dunk
Best Producer
**Catherine Marks**; Carl Brown; Romesh Dodangoda; Greg Fidelman; Adam "Nolly" Getgood; Larry Hibbitt; George Lever
The H
**Dom Fraser & Space**

=== 2021 ===
Best Album	Best UK Band
**Post Human: Survival Horror – Bring Me the Horizon**; Cannibal – Bury Tomorrow; Underneath – Code Orange; Sex, Death & the Infinite Void – Creeper; Ohms – Deftones; Tickets to My Downfall – Machine Gun Kelly; All Distortions Are Intentional – Neck Deep	**Bring Me the Horizon**; Bury Tomorrow; Creeper; Loathe; Neck Deep; Nova Twins; While She Sleeps
Best International Band	Best UK Breakthrough Band
**Ghostemane**; Corey Taylor; Deftones; Five Finger Death Punch; Lamb of God; The Pretty Reckless; Trivium	**Wargasm**; As Everything Unfolds; Caskets; Death Blooms; Phoxjaw; Salem; Static Dress
Best International Breakthrough Band	Best Album Artwork
**Spiritbox**; Dying Wish; END; Ghostkid; Meet Me @ the Altar; Tallah; Yours Truly	**Afterburner – Dance Gavin Dance (Mattias Adolfsson)**; Underneath – Code Orange (Jami Morgan); Sex, Death & the Infinite Void – Creeper (Demon Dance, Andy Pritchard); Anti-Icon – Ghostemane (Carlos Estrada aka Sliizz); Sleepless – Palm Reader (Tom Johnson, Jamie McDonals); Royal Swan – Phoxjaw (Peter the Roman)
Best Video	Best Podcast
**"Taxi" – Nova Twins**; "Animals" – Architects (dir. Dan Searle); "Obey" – Bring Me the Horizon ft. Yungblud (dir. Oli Sykes); "Ohms" – Deftones (dir. Rafatoon); "Snowblood" – ERRA (dir. Kevin Johnson); "Hypa Hypa" – Eskimo Cowboy (dir. Pascal Schillo & Oliver Schillo); "Sleeps Society" – While She Sleeps	**The Downbeat (Craig Reynolds)**; The Jasta Show (Jamey Jasta); Lifers (Ed Gamble); The Punk Rock MBA (Finn McKenty); Riot Act (Stephen Hill & Remfry Dedman); Sappenin' (Sean Smith & Morgan Richards); Someone Who Isn't Me (Daniel P. Carter)
Best Production
**Nothing Is True & Everything Is Possible – Enter Shikari (Rou Reynolds)**; Post Human: Survival Horror – Bring Me the Horizon (Jordan Fish & Oli Sykes); Underneath – Code Orange (Jami Morgan & Nick Raskulinecz); Sex, Death & the Infinite Void – Creeper (Xandy Barry); Brain Pain – Four Year Strong (Will Putney); I Let It In and It Took Everything – Loathe (Loathe & George Lever); Sleepless – Palm Reader (Lewis Johns)
The H
**Music Venue Trust**

=== 2022 ===
The H Award was given to Heavy Metal Truants, a charity cycle challenge established in 2013 by ex-Metal Hammer editor-in-chief Alexander Milas and Iron Maiden manager Rod Smallwood. As of 2022, it has raised over £1 million for Teenage Cancer Trust, Nordoff Robbins, Childline, and Save The Children. The Innovation Award was given to While She Sleeps in recognition of their fan-led Sleeps Society initiative, which allowed the band to release their fifth album Sleeps Society (2021) and stay afloat without the backing of a label and touring amidst the COVID-19 pandemic.

Best Album	Best UK Artist
**For Those That Wish to Exist – Architects**; Below – Beartooth; Bullet for My Valentine – Bullet for My Valentine; Amazing Things – Don Broco; The Greatest Mistake of My Life – Holding Absence Holding Absence; Eternal Blue – Spiritbox; Glow On – Turnstile	**Architects**; Bring Me the Horizon; Don Broco; Enter Shikari; Nova Twins; Sleep Token; While She Sleeps
Best International Artist	Best Live Artist
**Beartooth**; A Day to Remember; Gojira; Lorna Shore; Spiritbox; Trivium; Turnstile	**Enter Shikari**; Bring Me the Horizon; Bullet for My Valentine; Don Broco; Sleep Token; Wargasm; While She Sleeps
Best UK Breakthrough Band	Best International Breakthrough Band
**Cassyette**; Bob Vylan; Heriot; Kid Kapichi; Pupil Slicer; Static Dress; Witch Fever	**KennyHoopla**; Bloodywood; Magnolia Park; Meet Me @ the Altar; Pinkshift; Vended; Yours Truly
Best Single	Best Production
**"Die4u" – Bring Me the Horizon**; "Meteor" – Architects; "Out for Blood" – Code Orange; "Afterlife" – Holding Absence; "Circle with Me" – Spiritbox; "In the Court of the Dragon" – Trivium; "Fleabag" – Yungblud	**Bullet for My Valentine – Bullet for My Valentine (Carl Brown)**; Fortitude – Gojira (Joe Duplantier); The Greatest Mistake of My Life – Holding Absence (Dan Weller); Hushed and Grim – Mastodon (David Bottrill); Eternal Blue – Spiritbox (Daniel Braunstein and Michael Stringer); In the Court of the Dragon – Trivium (Josh Wilbur); Sleeps Society – While She Sleeps (Carl Brown and Sean Long)
Best Podcast	Best Video
**On Wednesdays We Wear Black (Sophie K & Yasmine Summan)**; The Downbeat (Craig Reynolds); Hell Bent For Metal (Tom Dare and Matt Rushton); Life in the Stocks (Matt Stocks); Peer Pleasure (Dewey Helpus); Sappenin Podcast with Sean Smith (Sean Smith and Morgan Richards); The State of the Scene Podcast (Sam & Marcos)	**"Pump It" – Electric Callboy (dir. Pascal Schillo & Oliver Schillo)**; "Die4u" – Bring Me the Horizon (dir. Oli Sykes); "Out for Blood" – Code Orange (dir. Max Moore); "Manchester Super Reds No.1 Fan" – Don Broco (dir. Do Not Entry); "Born for One Thing" – Gojira (dir. Charles De Meyes); "Hip to Be Scared" – Ice Nine Kills ft. Jacoby Shaddix (dir. Jensen Noen); "Don't You Feel Amazing?" – Trash Boat (dir. Zak Pinchin)
Best Album Artwork
**In the Court of the Dragon – Trivium (Mathieu Nozières)**; For Those That Wish to Exist – Architects (Tom Welsh, Giles Smith, Featherwax); Bloodmoon: I – Converge & Chelsea Wolfe (Jacob Bannon); Conquering – Employed to Serve (Luke Preece); Hushed and Grim – Mastodon (Paul Romano); Let the Bad Times Roll – The Offspring (Daveed Benito); Echo – Of Mice & Men (Derek Hess)
The H
Heavy Metal Truants
Innovation Award
The Sleeps Society – While She Sleeps

=== 2023 ===
The Scottish pop-punk band Vukovi led the Heavy Music Awards 2023 with five nominations (winning one), whilst Nova Twins, Halestorm and Ghost all received four nominations. The H Award was given to the Teddy Rocks Festival, founded by The Bottom Line guitarist Tom Newton to raise money for Teddy20, a children's cancer charity. The Icon award was given to Daniel P. Carter, radio DJ and host of the BBC Radio 1 Rock Show.

Best Album	Best Breakthrough Album
**The Death of Peace of Mind – Bad Omens**; The Classic Symptoms of a Broken Spirit – Architects; Impera – Ghost; Back From the Dead – Halestorm; Supernova – Nova Twins; The End, So Far – Slipknot; Nula – Vukovi	**Love and Other Lies – Charlotte Sands**; Rakshak – Bloodywood; Sad Girl Mixtape – Cassyette; Profound Morality – Heriot; Rouge Carpet Disaster – Static Dress; Explicit: The Mixxxtape – Wargasm; Congregation – Witch Fever
Best UK Artist	Best UK Live Artist
**Sleep Token**; Bob Vylan; Creeper; Holding Absence; Malevolence; Nova Twins; Vukovi	**Skindred**; Biffy Clyro; Creeper; Enter Shikari; Neck Deep; Nova Twins; Vukovi
Best International Artist	Best UK Breakthrough Artist
**Halestorm**; Bad Omens; Electric Callboy; Ghost; I Prevail; Polyphia; Spiritbox	**As December Falls**; Blackgold; Cody Frost; Delilah Bon; Kid Bookie; Lake Malice; ZAND
Best International Breakthrough Artist	Best Single
**Scene Queen**; Charlotte Sands; Chat Pile; LS Dunes; Scowl; Soul Blind; Zulu	**"The Void Stares Back"** – Enter Shikari ft. Wargasm; "When We Were Young" – Architects; "Strangers" – Bring Me the Horizon; "Ghost Brigade" – Creeper; "Call Me Little Sunshine" – Ghost; "They Fear Us" – Ithaca; "STFU" – Neck Deep
Best Production	Best Video
**Nula – Vukovi**; The Classic Symptoms of a Broken Spirit – Architects; The Death of Peace of Mind – Bad Omens; Back From the Dead – Halestorm; They Fear Us – Ithaca; Where Myth Becomes Memory – Rolo Tomassi; Rouge Carpet Disaster – Static Dress	**"Werewolf" – Motionless in White**; "Sad Girl Summer" – Cassyette; "The Liars Club" – Coheed and Cambria; "Hurrikan" – Electric Callboy; "Choose Your Fighter" – Nova Twins; "Glitch" – Parkway Drive; "Playing God" – Polyphia
Best Album Artwork	Best Festival
**Malicious Intent – Malevolence**; Vaxis – Act II: A Window of the Waking Mind – Coheed and Cambria; Darker Still – Parkway Drive; Remember That You Will Die – Polyphia; Nula – Vukovi; Congregation – Witch Fever; Zeal & Ardor – Zeal & Ardor	**Download**; 2000trees; Aftershock; BMTH Malta Weekender; Hellfest; Outbreak; Slam Dunk
Best International Live Artist	Best Breakthrough Live Artist
**Electric Callboy**; Alexisonfire; Ghost; Halestorm; My Chemical Romance; Parkway Drive; Turnstile	**Static Dress**; As Everything Unfolds; Cassyette; Heriot; Joey Valence & Brae; Lake Malice; Witch Fever
The H
**Teddy Rocks Festival**
Pioneer
**Biffy Clyro**
Icon
**Daniel P. Carter**

=== 2024 ===
Best Album	Best Breakthrough Album
**Take Me Back to Eden – Sleep Token**; Ultraviolet – As Everything Unfolds; One More Time... – Blink-182; Sanguivore – Creeper; A Kiss For the Whole World – Enter Shikari; The Noble Art of Self Destruction – Holding Absence	**A Mind Waiting to Die – Graphic Nature**; Rivers of Heresy – Empire State Bastard; Retrovision – Honey Revenge; A Call to the Void – Hot Milk; Imposter Syndrome – Sophie Lloyd; Venom – Wargasm; A New Tomorrow – Zulu
Best UK Artist	Best International Artist
**Skindred**; Architects; Bring Me the Horizon; Enter Shikari; Malevolence; Nova Twins; Sleep Token	**Spiritbox**; Avenged Sevenfold; Bad Omens; Beartooth; Electric Callboy; Landmvrks; Slaughter to Prevail
Best UK Live Artist	Best International Live Artist
**Holding Absence**; Bob Vylan; Bring Me the Horizon; Enter Shikari; Malevolence; Sleep Token; While She Sleeps	**Electric Callboy**; Bad Omens; Ice Nine Kills; Landmvrks; Limp Bizkit; Slipknot; Spiritbox
Best Breakthrough Live Artist	Best UK Breakthrough Live Artist
**Thrown**; Better Lovers; Kid Bookie; Knife Bride; Lake Malice; The Meffs; Scene Queen	**Røry**; ALT BLK ERA; Graphic Nature; Knife Bride; Snayx; Unpeople; Zetra
Best International Breakthrough Artist	Best Album Artwork
**Kim Dracula**; Games We Play; Half Me; Honey Revenge; Koyo; Speed; Thrown	**Sanguivore – Creeper**; Stone – Baroness; Rivers of Heresy – Empire State Bastard; 72 Seasons – Metallica; Take Me Back to Eden – Sleep Token; The Weight of the Mask – Svalbard
The H
**Bloodstock Metal 2 The Masses**
Icon
**Andy Copping**

=== 2025 ===
Best Album	Best Breakthrough Album
**Post Human: Nex Gen – Bring Me the Horizon**; Cartoon Darkness – Amyl and the Sniffers; American Motor Sports – Bilmuri; Devoured By the Mouth of Hell – Heriot; You Won't Go Before You're Supposed To – Knocked Loose; From Zero – Linkin Park; Negative Spaces – Poppy	**Excessive Guilt – Thrown**; From The New World – Allt; Highly Irresponsible – Better Lovers; Ignore This – Dead Pony; Restoration – Røry; Hot Singles in Your Area – Scene Queen; Only One Mode – Speed
Best UK Artist	Best International Artist
**Malevolence**; Architects; Bring Me the Horizon; Enter Shikari; Heriot; Neck Deep; Sleep Token	**Knocked Loose**; Bad Omens; Electric Callboy; Green Day; Linkin Park; Poppy; Spiritbox
Best UK Live Artist	Best International Live Artist
**Bury Tomorrow**; Bleed From Within; Boston Manor; Bring Me the Horizon; Enter Shikari; High Vis; Sleep Token	**Motionless in White**; Electric Callboy; Gojira; Green Day; Korn; Spiritbox; The Warning
Best Breakthrough Live Artist	UK Breakthrough Artist
**House of Protection**; Alt Blk Era; Better Lovers; LØLØ; Røry; South Arcade; Unpeople	**South Arcade**; Dead Pony; Lambrini Girls; Snayx; Split Chain; Unpeople; Vower
Best International Breakthrough Artist	Best Album Artwork
**Sleep Theory**; House of Protection; Allt; Amira Elfeky; Bambie Thug; Gel; Gore	**You Won't Go Before You're Supposed To – Knocked Loose**; People Watching – 156/Silence; Absolute Elsewhere – Blood Incantation; Searching for Solace – The Ghost Inside; Hole in My Head – Laura Jane Grace; From Zero – Linkin Park; Neck Deep – Neck Deep

=== 2026 ===
Best Album	Best Breakthrough Album
**Private Music – Deftones**; The Sky, The Earth & All Between – Architects; Creature in the Black Night – Dayseeker; Even in Arcadia – Sleep Token; Tsunami Sea – Spiritbox; Never Enough – Turnstile; Idols – Yungblud	**Afterglow – Sleep Theory**; Edge of the Abyss – Calva Louise; Something to Consume – Die Spitz; Who Let the Dogs Out – Lambrini Girls; Salvation Laughs in the Face of a Grieving Mother – Psycho-Frame; Motionblur – Split Chain; Hit It! – Vianova
Best UK Artist	Best International Artist
**Architects**; Bob Vylan; Don Broco; Enter Shikari; Malevolence; Sleep Token; Vukovi	**Bilmuri**; Deftones; Ice Nine Kills; Knocked Loose; Landmvrks; Spiritbox; Turnstile
Best UK Live Artist	Best International Live Artist
**Malevolence**; Architects; Biffy Clyro; Don Broco; Enter Shikari; Loathe; Sleep Token	**Bad Omens**; Deftones; Ghost; Ice Nine Kills; Spiritbox; Thornhill; Turnstile
Best Breakthrough Live Artist	UK Breakthrough Artist
**Unpeople**; Calva Louise; Lambrini Girls; President; South Arcade; Split Chain; Vower	**President**; Artio; False Reality; Lambrini Girls; Love is Noise; Split Chain; Unpeople
Best International Breakthrough Artist	Best Album Artwork
**The Pretty Wild**; Held.; Psycho-Frame; Sace6; TX2; Vianova; XCOMM	**The Darkest Place I've Ever Been - Landmvrks (Guy Mishima)**; Silver Bleeds the Black Sun – AFI (Don Phury, Davey Havok); The Sky, The Earth & All Between – Architects (Ed Mason, Frank Maddocks); Private Music – Deftones (Frank Maddocks); Where Only the Truth is Spoken – Malevolence (Elrian Kantor); Even in Arcadia – Sleep Token (Luke Penry); My God Has Got a Gun – Vukovi (Janine Shilstone)
