= Sonic Temple (festival) =

Rock music festival in Columbus, Ohio, USA

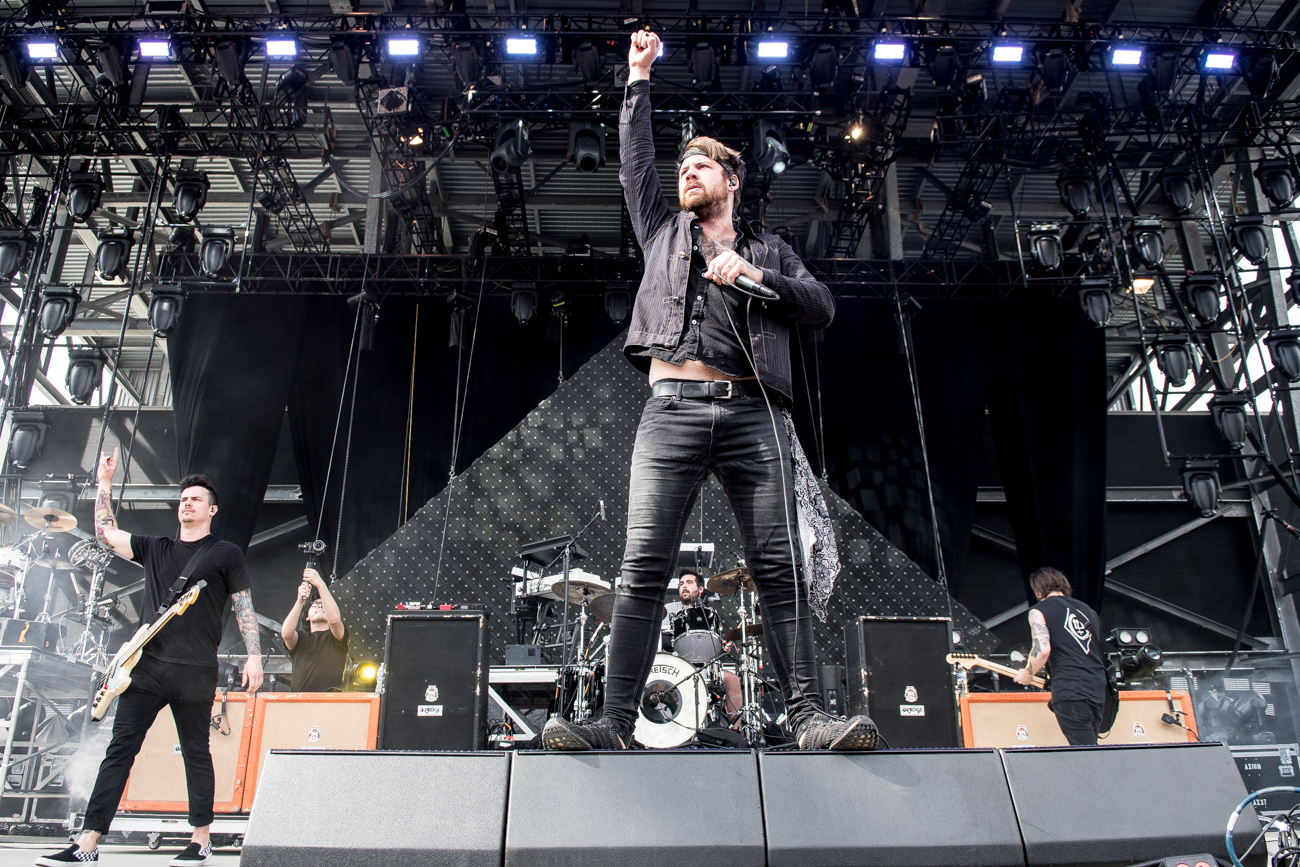
- Columbus band Beartooth performing at Sonic Temple 2019
- Genre: Heavy metal, hard rock, alternative rock, metalcore, post-hardcore, punk
- Dates: May 17–19, 2019; May 25–28, 2023; May 16–19, 2024; May 8–11, 2025; May 14–17, 2026; May 13–16, 2027
- Locations: Historic Crew Stadium (formerly Mapfre Stadium), Columbus, Ohio, United States
- Years active: 2019, 2023–present
- Website: sonictemplefestival.com

Sonic Temple Art & Music Festival, or simply Sonic Temple, is a hard rock, metal, and art festival held in Columbus, Ohio, United States at the Historic Crew Stadium, promoted by Danny Wimmer Presents. The inaugural festival was held in May 2019, replacing the previously annual Rock on the Range. Sonic Temple was to return in 2020, but was cancelled due to the COVID-19 pandemic, which put the festival on hiatus until its return in 2023 and it has been held annually since.

== History ==
In 2018, it was announced by Danny Wimmer Presents that their former Rock on the Range festival, held in Columbus, Ohio, United States at Mapfre Stadium (renamed Historic Crew Stadium in 2020), would be replaced by the Sonic Temple Art & Music Festival at the same location in 2019. This was due to creative differences with Rock on the Range co-promoter AEG Presents. The inaugural festival was a three-day event held from May 17–19 with estimated sold-out crowds of 120,000.

In December 2019, the full lineup for Sonic Temple 2020 was revealed. Metallica were to headline both Friday and Sunday night, with Slipknot headlining on Saturday. Other performers were to include Deftones, Bring Me the Horizon, Evanescence, Sublime with Rome, Rancid, Dropkick Murphys, Cypress Hill, Pennywise, Royal Blood, The Pretty Reckless, Alter Bridge, Anthrax, Flatbush Zombies, Pop Evil, Hellyeah, Ghostemane, Suicidal Tendencies, Testament, Dance Gavin Dance, Ice Nine Kills, Sleeping with Sirens, The Darkness, Knocked Loose, Code Orange, Power Trip, Saint Asonia, Dirty Honey, Jinjer, City Morgue, Bones UK, Airbourne, Fire from the Gods, Dinosaur Pile-Up, Des Rocs, Counterfeit, Crobot, Cherry Bomb, DED, Goodbye June, Brutus, 3Teeth, BRKN Love, Killstation, Brass Against, Crown Lands, Ego Kill Talent, Dregg, Bloodywood, and Zero 9:36, with more to have been announced. In February 2020, it was revealed that Metallica would be replaced as headliners by the Red Hot Chili Peppers on Friday and Tool on Sunday following frontman James Hetfield's entrance into a rehabilitation program for substance abuse. The following month, however, the festival was cancelled due to the COVID-19 pandemic, which also cancelled a planned 2021 festival.

After the festival was again not held in 2022 due to the ongoing pandemic, in November that year, it was announced that after a three-year hiatus, Sonic Temple would return in 2023 and be held as a four-day festival during Memorial Day weekend from May 25–28.

On August 23, 2023, the 2024 festival dates were announced for May 16–19. It was also revealed that the 2024 festival would expand to have four stages to allow for more bands to perform.

The 2025 festival dates were announced in June 2024. The 2025 edition was moved up a weekend, scheduled for May 8–11. On September 19, 2024, it was announced that Metallica would headline both Friday and Sunday nights, as they were originally supposed to do in 2020, with Rob Zombie and Alice in Chains opening for them on the respective nights. Korn and Linkin Park were also confirmed to headline Thursday and Saturday, respectively, with Bad Omens and Incubus opening for them on the respective nights. However, the day of their performance, Incubus canceled due to an illness; the schedule was shifted with I Prevail instead opening for Linkin Park. Alice in Chains would also cancel due to a non-life threatening medical issue, with Columbus band Beartooth brought in as a last minute replacement.

The 2026 dates were announced in June 2025, scheduled for May 14–17, 2026. On July 31, it was revealed that the 2026 festival would expand to having five stages, allowing for the addition of over 30 more bands. Tom Morello, The Offspring, Crown the Empire, CKY, and Thy Art is Murder were originally booked for the 2026 festival but had to cancel in the weeks leading up to the event, with Chevelle, Pop Evil, As You Were, Gideon, and 200 Stab Wounds replacing them.

The 2027 dates were announced in June 2026, scheduled for May 13–16, 2027.

== Events ==
=== 2019 ===
Day one (Friday, May 17)

Monster Energy Stadium Stage:

- System of a Down
- Ghost
- Halestorm
- Parkway Drive
- Beartooth
- Avatar
- Badflower

Echo Stage:

- Meshuggah
- Black Label Society
- Bad Wolves
- Zeal & Ardor
- Wage War
- SHVPES
- The Jacks

Wave Stage:

- Tom Morello
- Pussy Riot
- Ho99o9
- Cleopatrick
- Hands Like Houses
- Radattack

SiriusXM Comedy & Spoken Word Tent:

- Henry Rollins
- Tom Morello
- Shapel Lacy
- Nadya

Day two (Saturday, May 18)

Monster Energy Stadium Stage:

- Disturbed
- Papa Roach
- Lamb of God
- In This Moment
- Gojira
- Fever 333
- Black Coffee

Echo Stage:

- The Cult
- Killswitch Engage
- Architects
- The Black Dahlia Murder
- While She Sleeps
- Evan Konrad
- The Plot in You

Wave Stage:

- Action Bronson (did not perform due to an "unforeseen knee injury")
- Mark Lanegan Band
- Don Broco
- Movements
- Boston Manor
- No1Cares

SiriusXM Comedy & Spoken Word Tent:

- Andrew Dice Clay
- Eleanor Kerrigan
- Mark Normand
- Craig Grass

Day three (Sunday, May 19)

Monster Energy Stadium Stage:

- Foo Fighters
- Bring Me the Horizon (did not perform due to high winds)
- Chevelle (did not perform due to high winds)
- The Distillers (did not perform due to high winds)
- The Struts
- The Glorious Sons
- Amigo the Devil

Echo Stage:

- Joan Jett and the Blackhearts
- The Hives (performance ended early due to high winds)
- The Interrupters
- Yungblud
- Palaye Royale
- Dirty Honey
- Teenage Wrist

Wave Stage:

- Scars on Broadway (did not perform due to high winds)
- Refused (did not perform due to high winds)
- Black Pistol Fire (did not perform due to high winds)
- Basement (did not perform due to high winds)
- Scarlxrd (did not perform due to high winds)
- Demob Happy (did not perform due to high winds)

SiriusXM Comedy & Spoken Word Tent:

- Pauly Shore (did not perform due to high winds)
- Carmen Lynch (did not perform due to high winds)
- Joe Deuce (did not perform due to high winds)
- Bill Squire (did not perform due to high winds)

=== 2023 ===
Day one (Thursday, May 25)

Temple Stage:

- Tool
- Godsmack
- Beartooth
- Pennywise
- Miss May I
- Oxymorrons
- Fever 333 (did not perform)

Octane Stage:

- Bullet for My Valentine
- Bad Omens
- Anti-Flag
- Joey Valence & Brae
- Bones UK
- Malevolence
- Bastardane

SoundWave Stage:

- Suicidal Tendencies
- Ho99o9
- Angel Du$t
- Bloodywood
- Wargasm
- OTTO

Day two (Friday, May 26)

Temple Stage:

- Avenged Sevenfold
- Queens of the Stone Age
- Chevelle
- Badflower
- Black Stone Cherry
- Des Rocs
- Vended

Octane Stage:

- I Prevail
- Knocked Loose
- Dorothy
- Born of Osiris
- Fame on Fire
- Dayseeker

SoundWave Stage:

- Sleeping with Sirens
- Converge
- Band-Maid
- Brutus
- Mike's Dead
- A Feast for the Crows

Day three (Saturday, May 27)

Temple Stage:

- Kiss
- Rob Zombie
- Falling in Reverse
- Trivium
- Rival Sons
- Giovannie & the Hired Guns
- The Violent

Octane Stage:

- Puscifer
- Avatar
- From Ashes to New
- Attila
- Varials
- Tallah
- Capital Theatre

SoundWave Stage:

- Yelawolf Presents: Sometimes Y
- Senses Fail
- Mothica
- Point North
- Over the Moon
- Dead Poet Society (did not perform)

Day four (Sunday, May 28)

Temple Stage:

- Foo Fighters
- Deftones
- Jawbreaker
- The Pretty Reckless
- Nothing More
- Holy Wars
- The Bronx (did not perform)

Octane Stage:

- Sublime with Rome
- Awolnation
- White Reaper
- Ayron Jones
- Zero 9:36
- Tigercub
- Bob Vylan (did not perform)

SoundWave Stage:

- Grandson
- Filter
- Nova Twins
- Starcrawler
- Aeir
- Poorstacy (did not perform)

=== 2024 ===
Day one (Thursday, May 16)

Temple Stage:

- Disturbed
- Evanescence
- Mudvayne
- Theory of a Deadman
- P.O.D.
- Drowning Pool
- Nita Strauss

Cathedral Stage:

- Judas Priest
- Kerry King
- The Ghost Inside
- Nova Twins
- Taipei Houston
- Bob Vylan
- Tim Montana

Citadel Stage:

- Cypress Hill
- Electric Callboy
- Enter Shikari
- The Chats
- Magnolia Park
- TX2
- Lø Spirit

Sanctuary Stage:

- Machine Head
- August Burns Red
- Frank Carter & The Rattlesnakes
- Fire from the Gods
- Miss May I
- Catch Your Breath
- SiM
- HotBox

Day two (Friday, May 17)

Temple Stage:

- The Original Misfits
- Falling In Reverse
- Seether
- Anthrax
- Dirty Honey
- Nonpoint
- Point North

Cathedral Stage:

- Rise Against
- Sum 41
- Black Veil Brides
- Movements
- Terror
- Scowl
- Gel

Citadel Stage:

- Code Orange
- Mr. Bungle
- Drain
- Militarie Gun
- Rain City Drive
- The Chisel
- Gideon

Sanctuary Stage:

- Avatar
- Atreyu
- Soulfly
- Kublai Khan TX
- New Years Day
- Fleshwater
- I See Stars
- Fuming Mouth

Day three (Saturday, May 18)

Temple Stage:

- Pantera
- Staind
- Breaking Benjamin
- Starset
- Living Colour
- Saint Asonia (did not perform due to travel issues)
- Flat Black

Cathedral Stage:

- Sleep Token
- In This Moment
- Flyleaf with Lacey Sturm
- Kittie
- Destroy Boys
- Calva Louise
- VUKOVI

Citadel Stage:

- Polyphia
- The Amity Affliction
- Currents
- Spite
- Bodysnatcher
- Thrown
- Dying Wish

Sanctuary Stage:

- Slaughter to Prevail
- In Flames
- Lacuna Coil
- Harm's Way
- Empire State Bastard
- Imminence
- Mike's Dead

Day four (Sunday, May 19)

Temple Stage:

- Slipknot
- Limp Bizkit
- A Day to Remember
- Royal Blood
- Bad Religion
- Saliva
- Sleep Theory

Cathedral Stage:

- 311
- Architects
- Wage War
- Of Mice & Men
- Reignwolf
- Kim Dracula
- Blind Channel

Citadel Stage:

- Clutch
- Baroness
- Helmet
- Red Fang
- Crobot
- Plush
- Moon Fever
- Return to Dust

Sanctuary Stage:

- Tech N9ne
- L7
- While She Sleeps
- Taproot
- Bad Nerves
- Dead Poet Society
- Eva Under Fire

=== 2025 ===
Day one (Thursday, May 8)

Temple Stage:

- Korn
- Bad Omens
- Three Days Grace
- Sevendust
- Alien Ant Farm
- Orgy
- Return to Dust

Cathedral Stage:

- Motionless in White
- Poppy
- Memphis May Fire
- Fit for a King
- Boundaries
- Caskets
- Wind Walkers

Citadel Stage:

- Killswitch Engage
- Jinjer
- Shadows Fall
- Fit for an Autopsy
- Bleeding Through
- Left to Suffer
- As You Were

Sanctuary Stage:

- Ministry
- Filter
- Health
- Nitzer Ebb
- DED
- Uncured
- Silly Goose

Day two (Friday, May 9)

Temple Stage:

- Metallica
- Rob Zombie
- Alice Cooper
- Testament
- Exodus
- Overkill

Cathedral Stage:

- Insane Clown Posse
- Mastadon
- Acid Bath
- Suicidal Tendencies
- Deafheaven
- Converge
- 200 Stab Wounds
- Dead Heat

Citadel Stage:

- Cannibal Corpse
- Hatebreed
- Municipal Waste
- Gatecreeper
- Armored Saint
- Frozen Soul
- PeelingFlesh

Sanctuary Stage:

- Whitechapel
- All Shall Perish
- The Black Dahlia Murder
- After the Burial
- The Acacia Strain
- Upon a Burning Body
- Angelmaker

Day three (Saturday, May 10)

Temple Stage:

- Linkin Park
- Incubus (did not perform due to illness)
- I Prevail
- Trivium
- Hoobastank
- Citizen Soldier
- Sick Puppies

Cathedral Stage:

- Three 6 Mafia
- Bullet for My Valentine
- Jimmy Eat World
- Of Mice & Men
- Escape the Fate
- Set It Off
- Erra
- Nevertel

Citadel Stage:

- Grandson
- Crossfade
- Trust Company
- Framing Hanley
- The Funeral Portrait
- Bleed from Within
- Fight from Within

Sanctuary Stage:

- Underoath
- Silverstein
- The Devil Wears Prada
- Invent Animate
- Silent Planet
- Scary Kids Scaring Kids
- I Set My Friends On Fire

Day four (Sunday, May 11)

Temple Stage:

- Metallica
- Alice in Chains (did not perform due to a non-life threatening medical issue)
- Beartooth (last minute replacement for Alice in Chains)
- Chevelle
- Quicksand
- Cavalera
- Corrosion of Conformity

Cathedral Stage:

- Ice Nine Kills
- Hollywood Undead
- Asking Alexandria
- Badflower
- From Ashes to New
- The Plot in You
- Fame on Fire

Citadel Stage:

- Arch Enemy
- Gwar
- Obituary
- Nails
- Sanguisugabogg
- Shadow of Intent
- Fulci

Sanctuary Stage:

- Power Trip
- Sunami
- Terror
- Harm's Way
- Pain of Truth
- Candy
- Gridiron

=== 2026 ===
Day one (Thursday, May 14)

Temple Stage:

- My Chemical Romance
- Pierce the Veil
- All Time Low
- Coheed and Cambria
- L.S. Dunes
- Hawthorne Heights
- The Red Jumpsuit Apparatus

Cathedral Stage:

- Breaking Benjamin
- Rise Against
- The Used
- Flyleaf with Lacey Sturm
- Fozzy
- Egypt Central

Citadel Stage:

- Slaughter to Prevail
- Whitechapel
- 200 Stab Wounds
- Attila
- Bodysnatcher
- Carnifex
- Disembodied Tyrant
- Windwaker

Sanctuary Stage:

- Dayseeker
- Magnolia Park
- Catch Your Breath
- Holding Absence
- Wind Walkers
- Nerv
- The Pretty Wild

Altar Stage:

- Behemoth
- Cradle of Filth
- Dying Fetus
- Cattle Decapitation
- Napalm Death
- Fleshgod Apocalypse
- Suffocation
- Nekrogoblikon

Day two (Friday, May 15)

Temple Stage:

- Shinedown
- Staind
- Halestorm
- Stone Temple Pilots
- Daughtry
- Hinder
- Buckcherry

Cathedral Stage:

- Sublime
- Chevelle
- Yellowcard
- New Found Glory
- Everclear
- Lit

Citadel Stage:

- Simple Plan
- Story of the Year
- Atreyu
- blessthefall
- The Word Alive
- Woe, Is Me
- Left On Red
- As You Were

Sanctuary Stage:

- Lorna Shore
- Kublai Khan TX
- Paleface Swiss
- Chelsea Grin
- Brand of Sacrifice
- Signs of the Swarm
- Jiluka
- Not Enough Space

Altar Stage:

- Zakk Sabbath
- Sevendust
- Static-X
- Dope
- Powerman 5000
- Mushroomhead
- Soil
- Flaw

Day three (Saturday, May 16)

Temple Stage:

- Bring Me the Horizon
- Good Charlotte
- Motionless in White
- Black Veil Brides
- The Plot in You
- Palaye Royale
- Amira Elfeky

Cathedral Stage:

- Marilyn Manson
- Bush
- Alter Bridge
- Coal Chamber
- Pop Evil
- All That Remains

Citadel Stage:

- The Story So Far
- Mayday Parade
- Motion City Soundtrack
- The Wonder Years
- State Champs
- Citizen
- Knuckle Puck
- Allt

Sanctuary Stage:

- Architects
- The Amity Affliction
- August Burns Red
- The Ghost Inside
- Make Them Suffer
- Alpha Wolf
- Novelists

Altar Stage:

- Body Count
- Sepultura
- Kreator
- Carcass
- Biohazard
- Snot
- Gideon
- Butcher Babies

Day four (Sunday, May 17)

Temple Stage:

- Tool
- Godsmack
- Lamb of God
- Black Label Society
- Avatar
- P.O.D.
- Saliva

Cathedral Stage:

- Megadeth
- Public Enemy
- Amon Amarth
- Suicidal Tendencies
- In Flames
- Demon Hunter

Citadel Stage:

- Electric Callboy
- We Came As Romans
- Polaris
- Senses Fail
- Thrown
- Thornhill
- Conquer Divide

Sanctuary Stage:

- Dance Gavin Dance
- Chiodos
- Thrice
- Bloodywood
- Anberlin with Stephen Christian
- From First to Last
- Drop Dead, Gorgeous
- A Skylit Drive

Altar Stage:

- Dethklok
- DragonForce
- Apocalyptica
- DevilDriver
- Alestorm
- Wind Rose
- SpiritWorld
- Castle Rat
