= Delaire the Liar =

- Origin: London, U.K.
- Genres: Emo; post-hardcore; alternative rock
- Years active: 2018–2025
- Labels: Rude; Crooked Noise
- Past members: Ffinlo "Ffin" Colley; Joey Brayshaw; Hannah Watts; Emily "Em" Lodge; Charles "Chaz" Tomlinson

Delaire the Liar were an English rock band formed in London in 2018. Initially a duo, the group originally consisted of Joey Brayshaw (drums) and Ffinlo "Ffin" Colley (guitar vocals). This lineup released their debut EP Not Punk Enough in 2018. During the COVID-19 lockdown in the United Kingdom, Brayshaw departed from the group, and Colley recruited Hannah Watts (vocals, guitar) Em Lodge (bass) and Chaz Tomlinson (drums). They released to subsequent EPs, Eat Your Own (2021) and Self Defense (2023). In April 2025, they released the double single "Lamplight & Quiet / Vanishing Act", announcing that they would soon disband. They played their final show on 12 April 2025.

== History ==
Joey Brayshaw (drums) and Ffinlo "Ffin" Colley (guitar vocals) met through working at various music venues and bars, bonding over their shared interest in emo. They formed Delaire the Liar in 2018 and quickly signed to Crooked Noise Records through personal connections to the label's founder Tom Newman. They released their debut EP Not Punk Enough on 4 June 2018. On 22 August 2018, they released the single "Guilt & Recourse". They performed at 2000 Trees Festival, then on 1 November 2018, they supported Creeper at London's Koko. On 25 February 2019, they released the single "One of Us is the Killer", then performed on the Saturday of 2000 Trees festival 2019.

During the COVID-19 lockdown in the United Kingdom (2020–2021), they expanded into a four piece band, with Brayshaw departing, Colley recruited Hannah Watts (vocals, guitar) Em Lodge (bass) and Chaz Tomlinson (drums). They performed at the virtual 2000 Trees festival in July 2020. On 14 April 2020, they released the single "Locked (For A Reason)". On 19 July 2021, they released the single "Halloween". On 31 August 2021, they released the single "Furance". Between 12 and 28 October, they supported Vukovi on their UK headline tour. On 22 November, they released the single "No Thanks". On 25 November, they released the single "No Accident", revealing it would be a part of an upcoming EP. The EP was released on 21 December 2021, as Eat Your Own. They performed at 2000 Trees festival in July 2022.

On 24 April 2023, they released the single "Bite Trap", produced by Kel Pinchin of Modern Error. Between 26 and 28 August 2023, they headlined the Rude Records tour, with support from Oakman and Modern Error. They performed at 2000 Trees Festival 2023. On 1 August 2023, they released the single "Angel Number", announcing it would be a part of their EP Self Defence, which would be released by Rude Records on September 1. The single saw Lodge take on lead vocal duties. Self Dense was released on 1 September 2023, coinciding with music video for the track "All Your Labour". On 9 September, they performed at Burn it Down Festival, then on 30 September at Castlefest. On 9 October 2023, they released a live session of Self Defence, recorded and released by The Bookhouse Studios.

On 6 April 2025, they released the double single "Lamplight & Quiet / Vanishing Act", announcing they would be their final releases and they would soon disband. They played their final show on 12 April 2025 at London venue The Lexington, with support from the Throwaway Scene.

== Musical style ==
Critics categorised Delaire The Liar's music as post-hardcore, emo and alternative rock. In a 2023 interview with Bring the Noise, they self-identified as emo. Not Punk Enough was categorised by critics as punk rock. They incorporated elements of pop-punk, screamo, gothic rock and grunge.

Devolution magazine called them "alt rock fused with, whisper it quietly, emo". Noizze called their style when "Fuzzy alt-rock, 2000s emo and post-hardcore collide". Visions writer Jan Schwarzkamp noted their style as "theatrical", while RockFix writer Nick Davarias called them "eccentric".

The band's songs made frequent use of both screamed vocals and clean singing, with some tracks incorporating sprechgesang vocals. Colley's singing voice was high pitched, with Booklet Magazine comparing his voice to the vocalists of My Chemical Romance and Dance Gavin Dance. Self Dense was a concept EP, based on self-defense, which the band's press statement stated described as following "The usual themes surrounding the topic are present; antagonism, violence, action and reaction, but with a focus on the more drastic instances that require a less reflexive and more considered approach. Instances that require a deeper understanding of the self, emotional capacity for pain, physical capacity for punishment, moral detachment and sacrifice for the benefit of yourself or someone else"

=== Influences ===
In a 2018 interview with When the Horn Blows, founding drummer Joey Brayshaw described their music as similar to early At the Drive In, in an interview from the same year, Colley self-described as "La Dispute meets a melodic Alexisonfire". That year, Colley cited Gallows' debut album Orchestra of Wolves as his biggest influence, and listed cited his other personal influences as Static Dress, My Only, Touché Amoré, Drug Church, Joyce Manor, Jeff Rosenstock, Cultdreams, Doe, Cassels, Fews, Crows, Gender Roles, Amyl and the Sniffers, the Chariot, the 1975, Wargasm and Calva Louise. In an interview with Kerrang!, the "songs that changed my life" as including tracks by the Chariot, the Spill Canvas, Mayday Parade, Deaf Havana, the Strokes, Deep Purple, Daughter, Sparklehorse and OutKast, while in an interview with Loudwire he listed his "most cathartic post-hardcore songs" as including Being as an Ocean, Birds in Row, Pianos Become the Teeth, Touché Amoré, La Dispute, Defeater, Thrice, Letlive, Alexisonfire and Citizen. In a 2021 article for Music Feeds, he called One Wing by the Chariot a major influence.

Self Defense was influenced by Static Dress, Casey, Holding Absence, Code Orange, James and the Cold Gun, As Everything Unfolds, the Xcerts, Tigercub, Blanket, Soft Cult, Teenage Wrist, Smashing Pumpkins and Vukovi. Other influences they have cited include Bring Me the Horizon.

=== Legacy ===
Kerrang! listed Eat Your Own as the ninth "best EP [sic] of 2021". A 2022 article by Bring the Noise writer Katie Conway-Flood called them "one of the most hotly tipped up and comers the scene has seen in recent years". Noizze called them "Pioneers of the unorthodox". Boolin Tunes called them "one of the key 'whatever'-wave emo revival bands... of a different variety".

== Members ==
Final lineup

- Ffinlo "Ffin" Colley – vocals (2018–2025)
- Hannah Watts – guitar (2020–2025)
- Emily "Em" Lodge – bass, vocals (2020–2025)
- Charles "Chaz" Tomlinson – drums (2020–2025)

Former

- Joey Brayshaw – drums (2018–2020)

== Discography ==
EPs

- Not Punk Enough (2018)
- Eat Your Own (2021)
- Self Defense (2023)
