= Pagan Rhythms =

Studio album by SpiritWorld
- Released: July 10, 2020
- Studio: The Panda Studios
- Genre: Death metal; thrash metal
- Length: 31:24
- Language: English
- Label: Century Media
- Producer: Sam Pura

SpiritWorld chronology
Pagan Rhythms (2020)	Deathwestern (2022)

Pagan Rhythms is the debut studio album by American death metal and thrash metal band SpiritWorld, released by Century Media Records on July 10, 2020.

== Reception ==
James Hickle of Kerrang! calls this "a soundtrack to [frontman] Stu [Folsom]'s non-musical writing, combining galloping thrash, pummelling hardcore, swinging rock’n’roll, and lyrical preoccupations with the American frontier and Native American mythology into a concoction its creator calls ‘death western’" that he rates 4 out of 5. Louder Sound's Joe Daly rated this release 4 out of 5 stars, calling this album "a bloody dive into the Wild West" that features "chaotic tempos and grinding death metal riffs".

== Track listing ==
All songs written by Stu Folsom.

1. "Pagan Rhythms" – 5:16
2. "The Bringer of Light" – 2:05
3. "Unholy Passages" – 3:54
4. "Night Terrors" – 3:00
5. "The Demon Storm" – 3:43
6. "Armageddon Honkytonk & Saloon" – 3:18
7. "Godless" – 3:09
8. "Comancheria" – 3:10
9. "Ritual Human Sacrifice" – 3:49

== Personnel ==
SpiritWorld

- Stu Folsom – guitar, bass guitar, vocals, production

Additional personnel

- Raef Brylowe – additional vocals
- Adam Elliott – drums
- Lord Beezus – executive creative director
- Randy Moore – guitar
- Thomas Pridgen – drums
- Sam Pura – bass guitar, guitar, additional vocals, engineering, production, mastering
- Matt Schrum – guitar, additional vocals
- Ben Verhoek – additional vocals

== See also ==
- List of 2020 albums
