= The Boileroom (Guildford) =

- Interactive map of The Boileroom
- Location: Guildford, Surrey, England
- Coordinates: 51.239944°N 0.572991°W
- Capacity: 275

Construction
- Opened: 2006

Website
- https://www.theboileroom.net

The Boileroom is a music venue and cultural arts space in Guildford owned by The Boileroom CIC (previously 'The Boileroom Limited' until 2022)

The venue was founded in 2006 by its current director Dominique Fraser. Who would later go on to win 'The H' at the Heavy Music awards in 2020.

In 2014 the venue faced scrutiny from its neighbours, citing a rise in antisocial behaviour from customers of the venue claiming that the venue had breached its licence in four key areas.

The venue management started an online petition in response to the councils inquiry, which would be signed by notable public figures such as Ed Sheeran (who had previously played at the venue).

However, by September an agreement had been reached between the venue and local council, such that the venue would now close its beer garden half an hour earlier.

== Notable Gigs ==
- Ed Sheeran (2011) Sheeran performed at the venue on the 19th of July 2011, before the release of his debut album '+' which he would release later in the year.
- The 1975 (2013) The band played at the venue on the 31st of January 2013 as part of the tour for their second, self titled album 'The 1975'
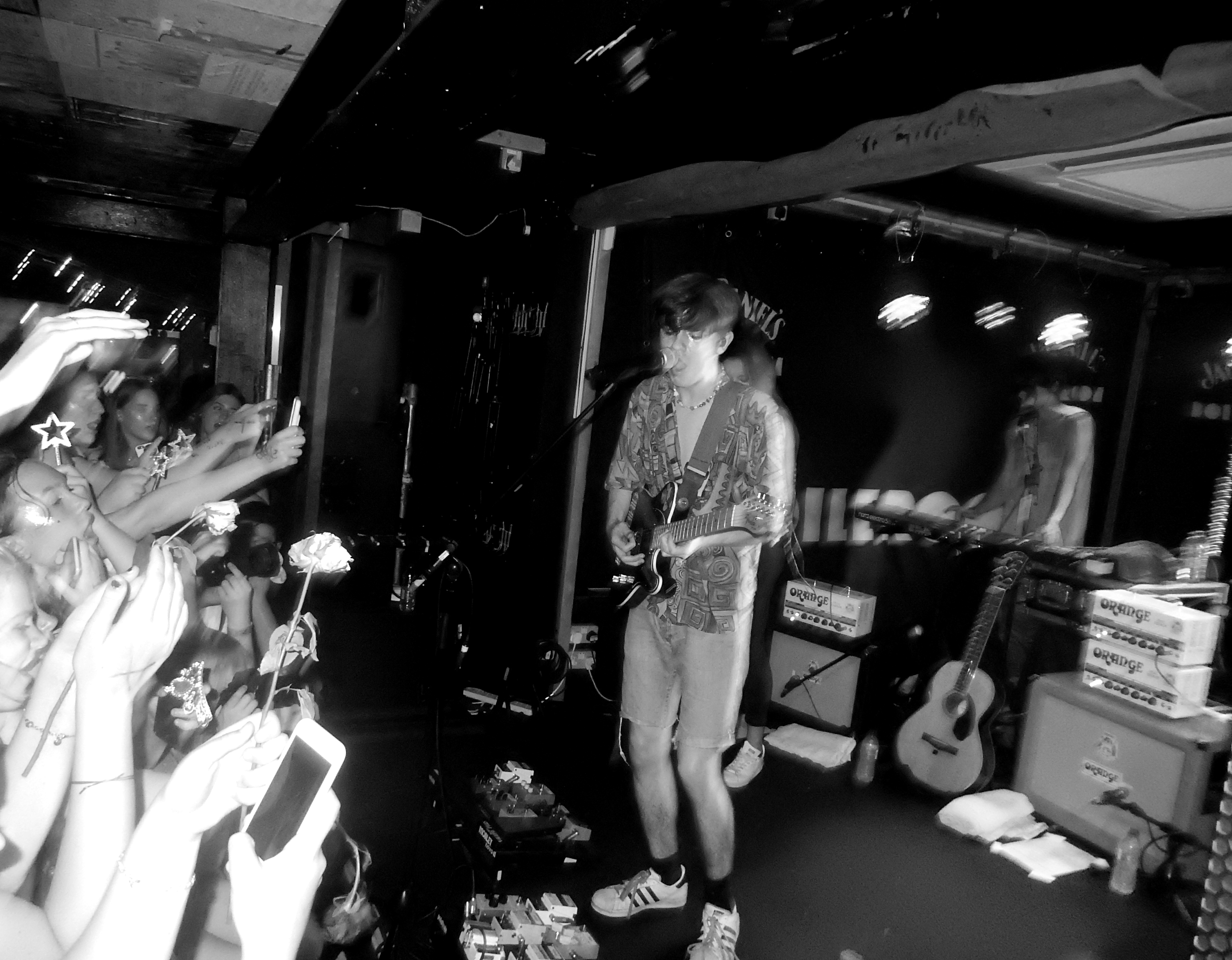
  McKenna at The Boileroom (2017)
- Declan McKenna (2020) McKenna has performed at the venue multiple times. The latest being in 2020 as part of his Album tour 'Zeros' in which he sold out the venue. McKenna previously performed at the venue in 2017 as part of his debut album's tour 'What Do You Think About The Car?' and in 2016.
- Bastille

== Haus of Wurst ==
Haus of Wurst is an open garden restaurant located in the rear of The Boileroom, specialising in German Sausage and alcoholic beverages.
