= Deathwestern =

Studio album by SpiritWorld
- Released: November 25, 2022
- Studio: The Panda Studios
- Genre: Death metal; thrash metal; metalcore
- Length: 36:08
- Language: English
- Label: Century Media
- Producer: Stu Folsom; Sam Pura

SpiritWorld chronology
Pagan Rhythms (2020)	Deathwestern (2022)	Helldorado (2025)

Deathwestern is the second studio album by American death/thrash band SpiritWorld, released by Century Media Records on November 11, 2022.

== Reception ==
Nick Ruskell of Kerrang! calls this "a brutal metalcore knuckle sandwich", which has weak writing but is still "a good, but not entirely groundbreaking set of punishing songs" that he rates 3 out of 5. Editors at Stereogum chose this for Album of the Week, with critic Chris DeVille characterizing it as "a gory symphony that owes as much to Slayer as Cormac McCarthy".

== Track listing ==
1. "Mojave Bloodlust" – 1:03
2. "DEATHWESTERN" – 3:26
3. "Relic of Damnation" – 2:27
4. "Purafied in Violence" – 2:56
5. "U L C E R" – 3:06
6. "Committee of Buzzards" – 4:53
7. "The Heretic Butcher" – 5:10
8. "Moonlit Torture" – 4:34
9. "Crucified Heathen Scum" – 1:39
10. "Lujuria Satánica" – 2:59
11. "1000 D E A T H S" – 3:55

== Personnel ==
SpiritWorld

- Stu Folsom – vocals, production

Additional personnel

- James Bousema – artwork
- Theresa Brown – engineering, mixing
- Alberto De Icaza – mastering
- Piper Ferrari – layout
- Justin Fornof – bass guitar
- Dwid Hellion – backing vocals on "Moonlit Torture"
- Kat Mantor – photography
- Randy Moore – acoustic guitar, lead guitar
- Sam Pura – guitar, bass guitar, drums, engineering, mixing, production
- Thomas Pridgen – drums
- Matt Schrum – guitar, percussion, backing vocals

== See also ==
- Lists of 2022 albums
