= 200 Stab Wounds =

American metal band

- Origin: Cleveland, Ohio
- Genre: Death metal
- Years active: 2019–present
- Label: Metal Blade
- Members: Steve Buhl; Owen Pooley; Raymond MacDonald; Todd Thompson
- Past members: Lance Buckley; Ezra Cook
- Website: www.200stabwounds.net

200 Stab Wounds is an American death metal band from Cleveland founded in 2019.

== History ==
Founded in 2019, they released their debut EP, Piles of Festering Decomposition the following year, and studio album Slave to the Scalpel in 2021. In 2024, they released their second album, Manual Manic Procedures, after signing to Metal Blade Records. Their third album, Lowest Form, will be released on February 19, 2027.

== Members ==
=== Current ===
- Steve Buhl – lead guitar, vocals (2019-present)
- Owen Pooley – drums (2020-present)
- Raymond MacDonald – rhythm guitar (2023-present)
- Todd Thompson – bass (2025-present, touring 2024)

=== Past ===
- Lance Buckley – rhythm guitar (2019-2023)
- Ezra Cook - bass (2019-2025)
- Ryan Sposito - rhythm guitar (touring 2023)

== Discography ==
=== Albums ===
- Slave to the Scalpel (2021)
- Manual Manic Procedures (2024)
- Lowest Form (2027)

=== EPs ===
- Piles of Festering Decomposition (2020)
- Masters of Morbidity (2023)
