= Nicola Samori =

Italian painter and poet (born 1977)

Nicola Samorì (born 1977) is an Italian painter and poet.

== Life ==
Samorì was born in 1977 in Forlì. He graduated from the Academy of Fine Arts in Bologna and currently lives and works in Bagnacavallo.

== Career ==
Samorì is known for his contemporary interpretations of 16th and 17th century European artworks, although he makes also frequent references to older art styles. His work is best described as dark and baroque, with canvases often damaged by scraping, diluting, slashing, and tearing. Referring to his physical manipulation of the painting surface, R.C. Baker of the Village Voice said that "Samorì's rereadings of old master oils are a revelation".

== Exhibitions ==
Samorì's work was a part of the Italian Pavilion at the 2015 Venice Biennale.

== Collections ==
Samorì's work is included in the Taylor Art Collection in Denver, Colorado as well as other numerous private collections internationally.

== Works ==
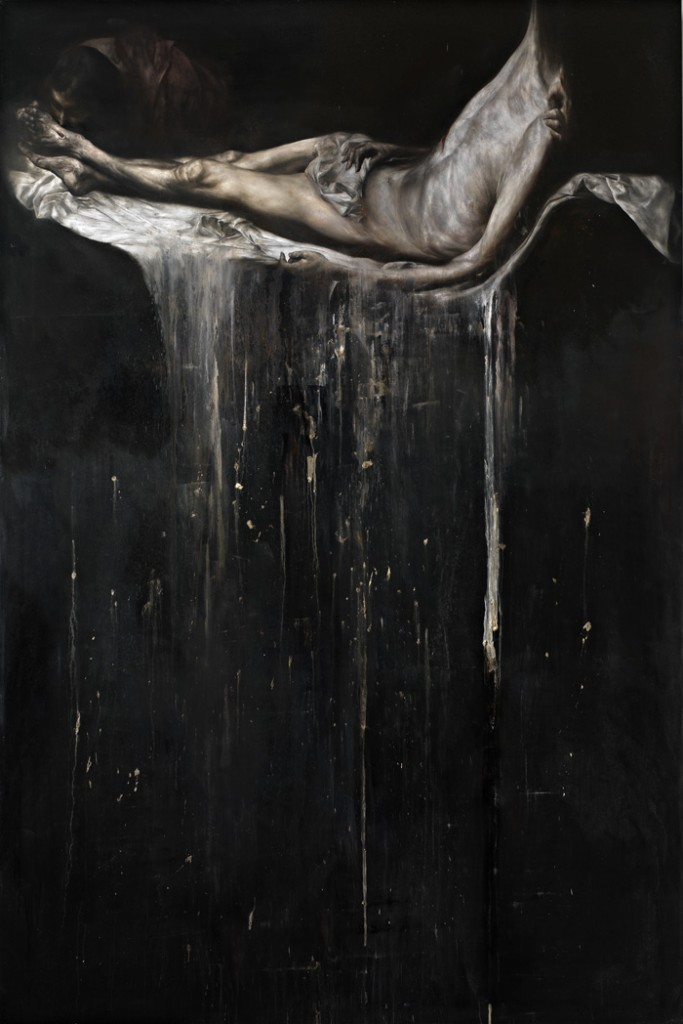
Rupture, 2009

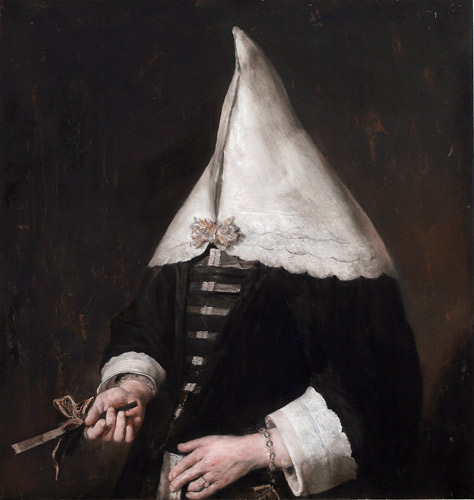
J.V., 2009
