= South Arcade =

English rock band

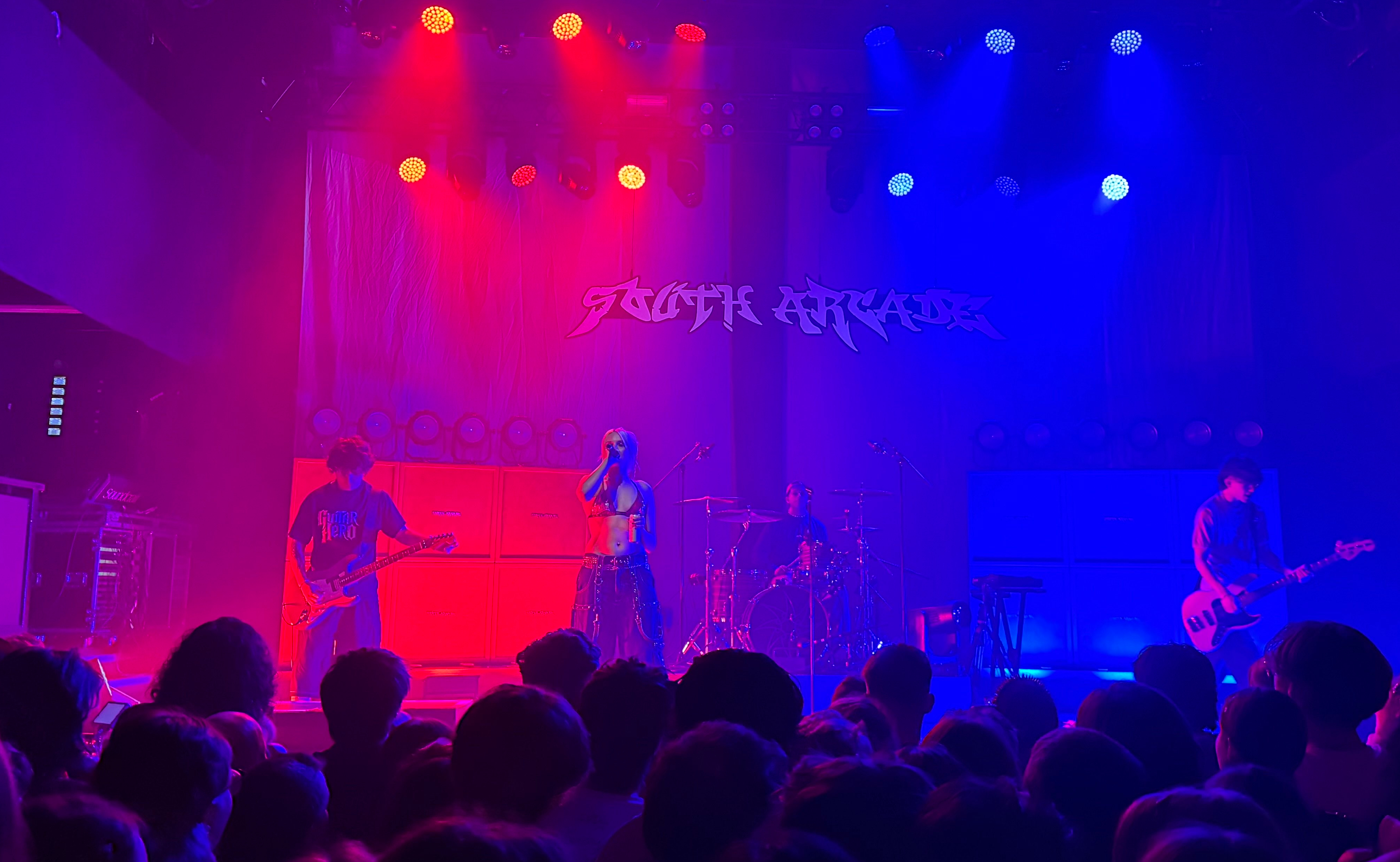
- South Arcade performing in London, 2025

Background information
- Origin: Oxford, England
- Genres: Pop-punk; alternative rock; nu metal
- Years active: 2021–present
- Labels: LAB; Atlantic
- Members: Harmony Cavelle; Harry Winks; Ollie Green; Cody Jones
- Website: southarcade.com

South Arcade are an English rock band from Oxford. Formed in 2021, the band went viral for videos of their band practices. Their debut EP, 2005, was inspired by various genres and artists from the 2000s and was received positively by critics. Their works are usually described as pop-punk or alternative rock and have been likened to those by Pale Waves, Avril Lavigne, and Bring Me the Horizon.

== History ==
South Arcade were formed in 2021 and comprise Harmony Cavelle (lead vocals), Harry Winks (guitar), Ollie Green (bass guitar), and Cody Jones (drums). The band formed in Guildford at university and later moved to Cavelle's house in Oxford. They played their earliest gigs in a garage and named themselves after a sign at Westgate Oxford. The band released "Danger" in 2023, followed by "Silverlight" that September and "Nepo Baby" in January 2024. That April, the band released "Riptide" on BKM and LAB Records; the following month, "Danger" exceeded one million streams on Spotify, prompting the band to announce a tour. They then released "Stone Cold Summer" in June and "How 2 Get Away with Murder" in August; the latter was accompanied by a cartoon involving a rivalry between South Arcade and the fictional band North Arcade.

By October 2024, the band had gone viral on Instagram and TikTok for videos of their band practices. That month, they released "Moth Kids", a track they had started shortly after forming but only finished after their first tour. In November, they performed at BBC Radio 1's New Music Live in Halifax, West Yorkshire. The band set up for this with less than a minute to spare as they realised with 34 seconds remaining that a laptop with a click track had not been set up properly, prompting Green to have to transfer files onstage while the presenter was still announcing them.

The band released the six-track EP 2005 in December 2024, which contained all five of the singles they had released that year and a title track and was reviewed positively by Distorted Sound Magazine, followed by a music video for the song the month after. By March 2025, the band had supported Dead Pony, Roxanne Emery, and Yours Truly; that month, they signed a publishing deal with Kobalt Music Group and released the single "Supermodels". In July, they signed with Atlantic Records. In October 2025, during their American Tour, the band released the single "Drive Myself Home" and announced their next EP, titled Play!, would be released on 21 November 2025. On 15 November, its release was postponed until the 28 November with the band stating that "being on tour [...] has made it tough to finish to the standard [fans] deserve".

On 10 April 2026, the band released the single "Superman", described as a "rage anthem". Ahead of performing at the 2026 Download Festival, the band released another single, titled "Deadmeat" on 5 June. After having been previewed at live events during Summer 2026, the band released "F.A.M.O.U.S" as a single on 18 September.

== Artistry ==
Reviewing a February 2024 As Everything Unfolds support slot at The Exchange in Bristol, Jack Ridsdale of Distorted Sound Magazine described the band's wares as "snot-nosed pop-punk" and likened the melodies of "Unaware" to those of Pale Waves; around the same time, LeftLion's Ben Blissett wrote of a support slot for the same band at Rescue Rooms in Nottingham that South Arcade blended "some metal elements with pop punk" and incorporated "guitar riffs which were reminiscent of Avril Lavigne but basslines that could belong in a much heavier band like Bring Me the Horizon". Writing in October 2024, Chris Attridge of the BBC described them as a "pop/alt rock" band and Isabelle Winter of The Oxford Blue described them as an alternative rock band. That January, Ailsha Davey of Screen Rant described their sound as "retrofuturistic synthwave".

The band have cited inspiration from music of the 2000s including Avril Lavigne, Gwen Stefani, Limp Bizkit, and Linkin Park. Their early works were inspired by The 1975, while the EP 2005 was inspired by pop punk, nu metal, Britney Spears, Gwen Stefani, Limp Bizkit, and Linkin Park. "How 2 Get Away with Murder" was specifically inspired by Dexter, which Cavelle had binge-watched, and its video was inspired by Scott Pilgrim.

== Band members ==
- Harmony Cavelle – lead vocals
- Harry Winks – guitar
- Ollie Green – bass
- Cody Jones – drums

== Discography ==
=== Extended plays ===
List of extended plays, with selected chart positions
Title	EP details	Peak chart positions
Title	EP details	UK Down.
2005	Released: 13 December 2024; Label: LAB Records	—
Play! (Note: Stylised in uppercase)	Released: 28 November 2025; Label: LAB Records	62

=== Singles ===
List of singles
Title	Year	Album
"Bigger Than Anything Ever"	2022	Non-album singles
"New Fever"	2022	Non-album singles
"Change Your Mind"	2022	Non-album singles
"Sound of an Empty Room"	2023	Non-album singles
"Danger"	2023	Non-album singles
"Unaware"	2023	Non-album singles
"Silverlight"	2023	Non-album singles
"Nepo Baby"	2024	2005
"Riptide"	2024	2005
"Stone Cold Summer"	2024	2005
"How 2 Get Away with Murder"	2024	2005
"Moth Kids"	2024	2005
"Supermodels"	2025	Play!
"Fear of Heights"	2025	Play!
"Drive Myself Home"	2025	Play!
"Superman"	2026	TBA
"Deadmeat"	2026	TBA
"F.A.M.O.U.S"	2026	TBA
"Splitscreen"	2026	TBA

== Tours ==
=== Headlining ===
- Arc.Angel Tour – UK tour (2023; six shows)
- I Was Here First Tour – UK tour (2024; five shows)
- The Rematch – UK tour (2025; two shows)
- American Tour – US tour (2025; 21 shows)
- UK & ROI tour (2025; seven shows)
- Welcome to the Real World Tour – UK tour (2027; 12 shows)

=== Supporting ===
- Yours Truly – Is This What I Look Like? Tour (2023; six shows)
- As Everything Unfolds – Ultraviolet UK Tour (2024; twelve shows)
- Noahfinnce – UK Tour (2024; seven shows)
- Magnolia Park – The Vamp Tour (2025; twenty-five shows)
- Bilmuri – European Motor Tour (2025; twelve shows)
- Bilmuri – Australian Motor Tour (2025; five shows)
- 5 Seconds of Summer – Everyone's a Star! World Tour (2026; twenty-four shows)
