= Landmvrks =

French metalcore band

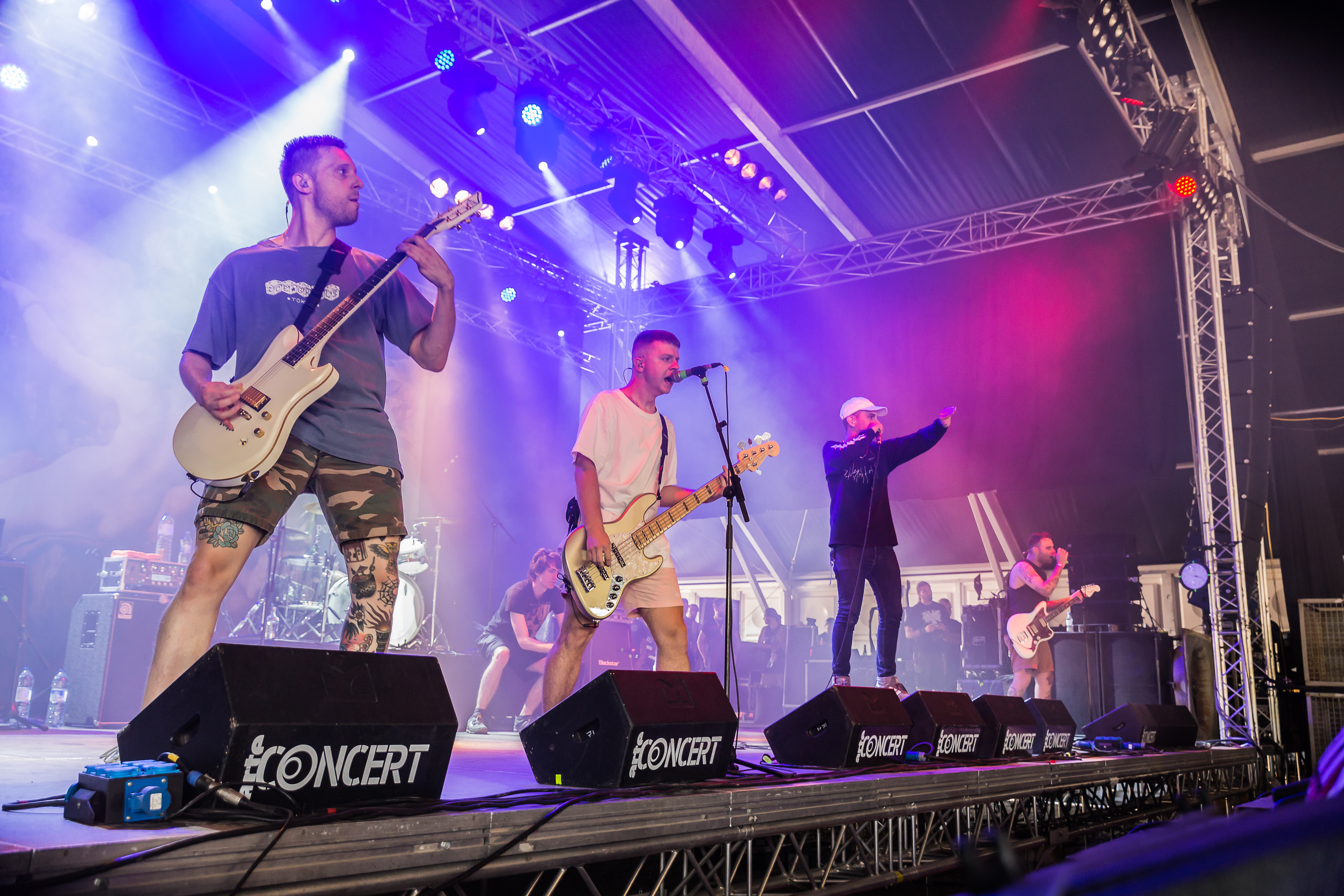
- Landmvrks performing at Full Force in 2019

Background information
- Origin: Marseille, France
- Genres: Metalcore; nu metal
- Years active: 2014–present
- Label: Arising Empire
- Members: Florent Salfati; Rudy Purkart; Nicolas Exposito; Paul "C. Wilson" Cordebard; Kévin D'Agostino
- Past members: Nicolas Soriano; Thomas Lebreton
- Website: landmvrks.com

Landmvrks (pronounced and originally spelt "Landmarks", now stylised in all caps, LANDMVRKS) is a French metalcore band from Marseille, formed in 2014. The band has since released four studio albums and is signed to Arising Empire.

== History ==
The band was formed in 2014 under the name "Coldsight" by Florent Salfati and Nicolas Soriano. Salfati, who was originally planned as the guitarist, was also at the time the founding vocalist of the band Hate in Front. After the search for a suitable lead singer was not successful, Salfati found himself taking in the position of the lead vocalist. By this time, the band's formation was nearly complete, with bassist Rudy Purkart and rhythm guitarist Thomas Lebreton. After Salfati became the vocalist of the band, Nicolas Exposito took over as the lead guitarist and changed their name to "Landmarks".

In 2015, they changed the spelling of their name to "Landmvrks".

After the band mostly produced singles in the early years of their career, they released their self-produced debut album Hollow on May 10, 2016. In the same year, the band performed at Hellfest for the first time. The performance was recorded and released as a live album, Live at Hellfest (EP).

In 2018, the band signed a record deal with German label Arising Empire and would release their second album, Fantasy under the label on May 2, 2018. On January 7, 2019, it was announced that drummer and founding member Nicolas Soriano had left the band, with Kévin D'Agostino replacing him on drums shortly after his departure.

In 2019, the band toured Europe with Any Given Day and in Japan, opening for Polaris. A European tour was scheduled to take place in 2020 but had to be postponed for a year due to the outbreak of the SARS-CoV-2 virus and the associated global COVID-19 pandemic.

In 2021, the band released their third album Lost in the Waves. It reached a chart placement in the German album charts at number 17. The band would release a deluxe version of the album on March 18, 2022, titled Lost in the Waves (The Complete Edition). This edition includes live versions of some of their tracks as well as three new tracks featuring duets with Andrew Dijorio (also known as Drew York) of Stray From The Path, Bertrand Poncet of Chunk! No, Captain Chunk! and Anthony Diliberto of Resolve.

In the fall of 2022, they toured the United States with Miss May I.

The band released their fourth studio album titled The Darkest Place I've Ever Been on April 25, 2025.

== Musical style ==
According to reviewer Nadine Schmidt of Metal.de, the band Hundredth, along with older Architects releases, are similar to the debut album Hollow and provided with subtle djent insertions. Comparisons to bands such as Bring Me the Horizon, Architects and A Day to Remember are heard on the album Fantasy, along with elements from nu metal. On the third album Lost in the Waves, Landmvrks play a mixture of metalcore, hardcore punk, and pop-heavy punk rock with isolated hip-hop elements.

Florent Salfati's screams are reminiscent of vocalists of hardcore bands such as Andrew Neufeld of Comeback Kid and Bryan Garris of Knocked Loose. On Lost in the Waves, Salfati is even said to have vocal similarities to Chester Bennington of Linkin Park, while having deathcore-esque growls mixed in with their songs.

They have cited influences including Comeback Kid, Stick to Your Guns, Madball, Hatebreed, Terror, Metallica, Slipknot, Kendrick Lamar, Box Car Racer, Blink-182 and Gojira.

== Band members ==
Current

- Florent Salfati – lead vocals (2014–present); guitars, bass (2014)
- Rudy Purkart – bass, backing vocals (2014–present)
- Nicolas Exposito – lead guitar, backing vocals (2014–present)
- Paul Cordebard – rhythm guitar, backing vocals (2017–present)
- Kévin D'Agostino – drums (2019–present)

Former

- Nicolas Soriano – drums (2014–2019)
- Thomas Lebreton – rhythm guitar (2014–2017)

Touring

- Aurélien Mariat – bass, backing vocals (2021–2024)

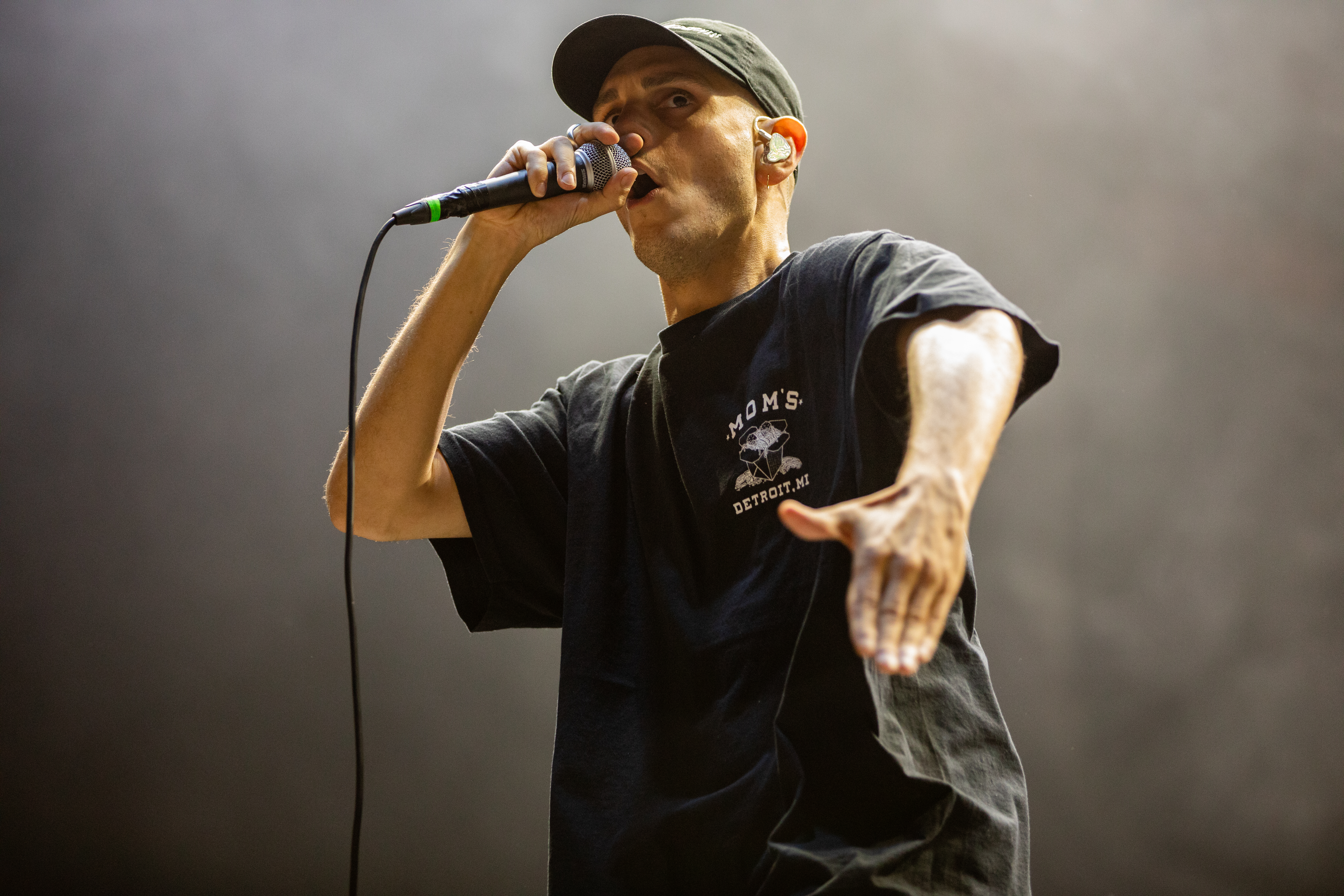
Florent Salfati performing at Southside Festival 2025

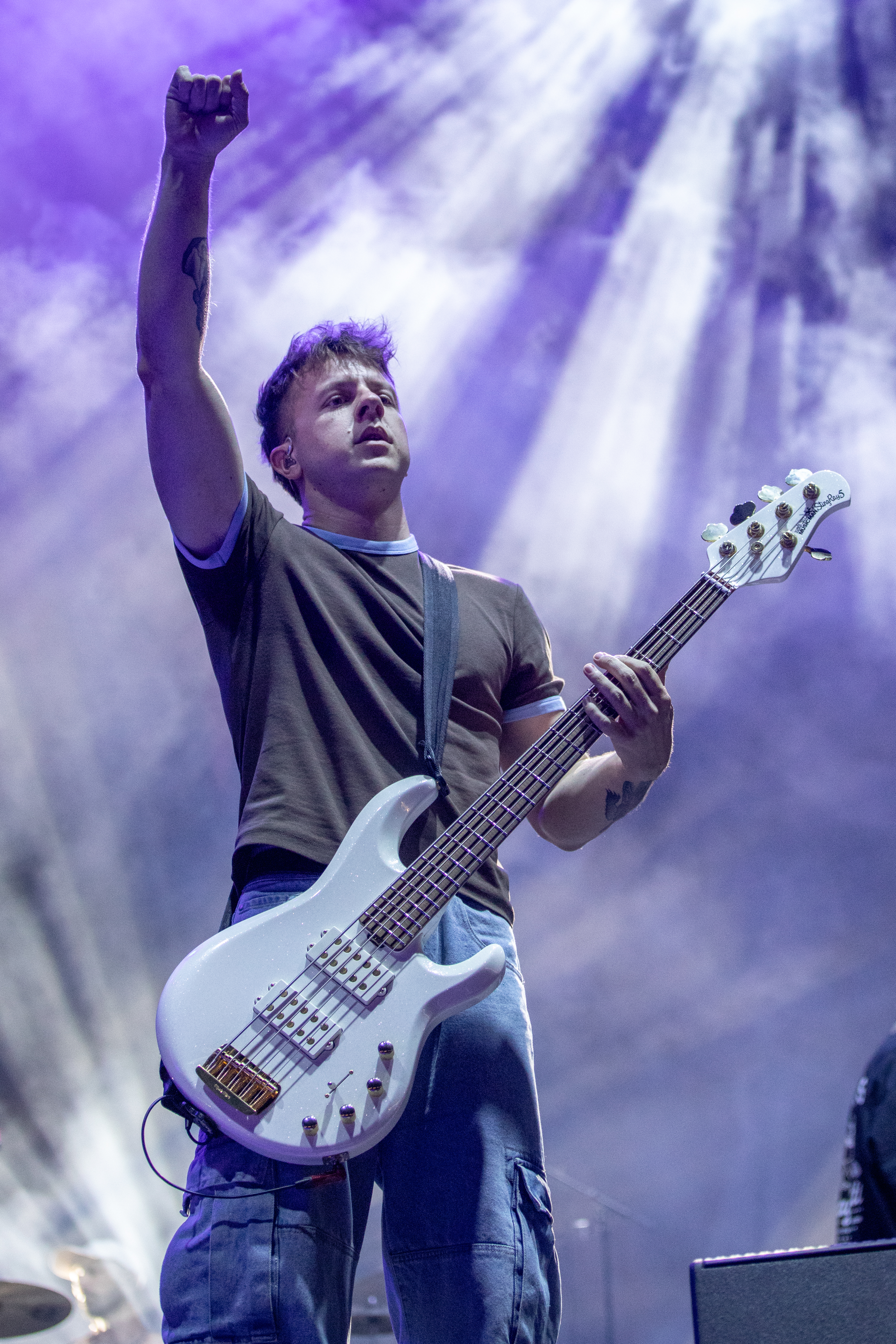
Rudy Purkart performing at Southside Festival 2025

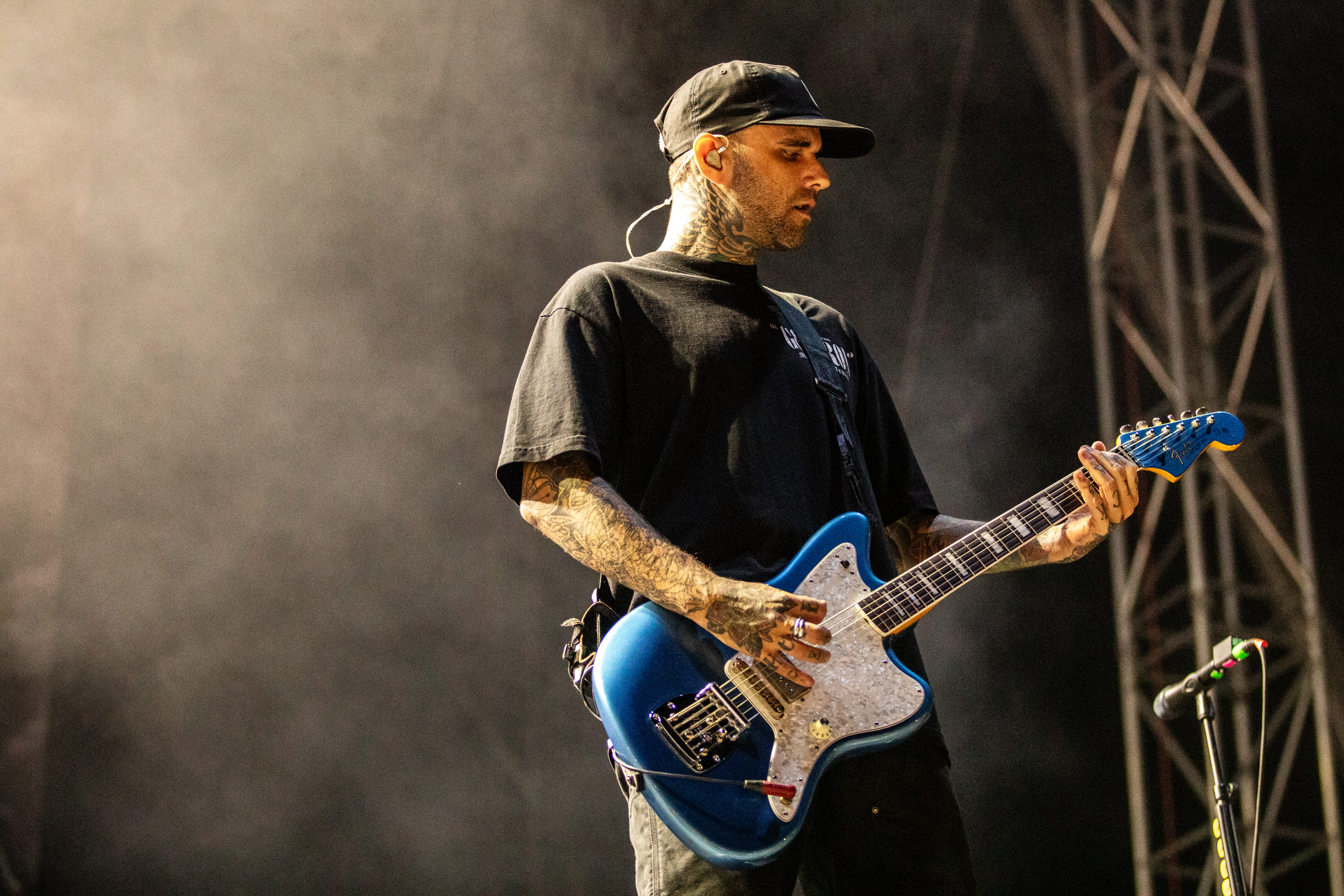
Nicolas Exposito performing at Southside Festival 2025

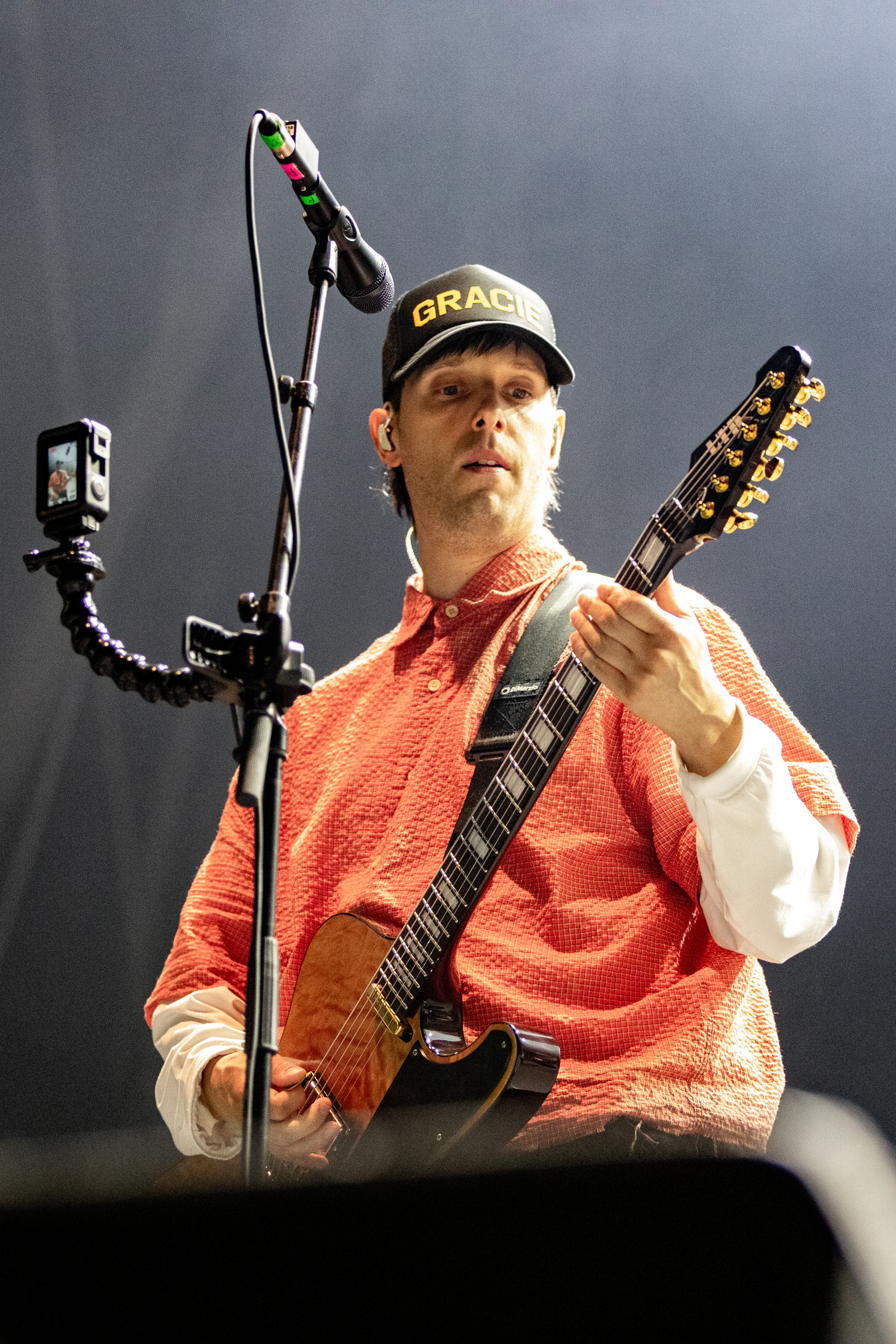
Paul Cordebard performing at Southside Festival 2025

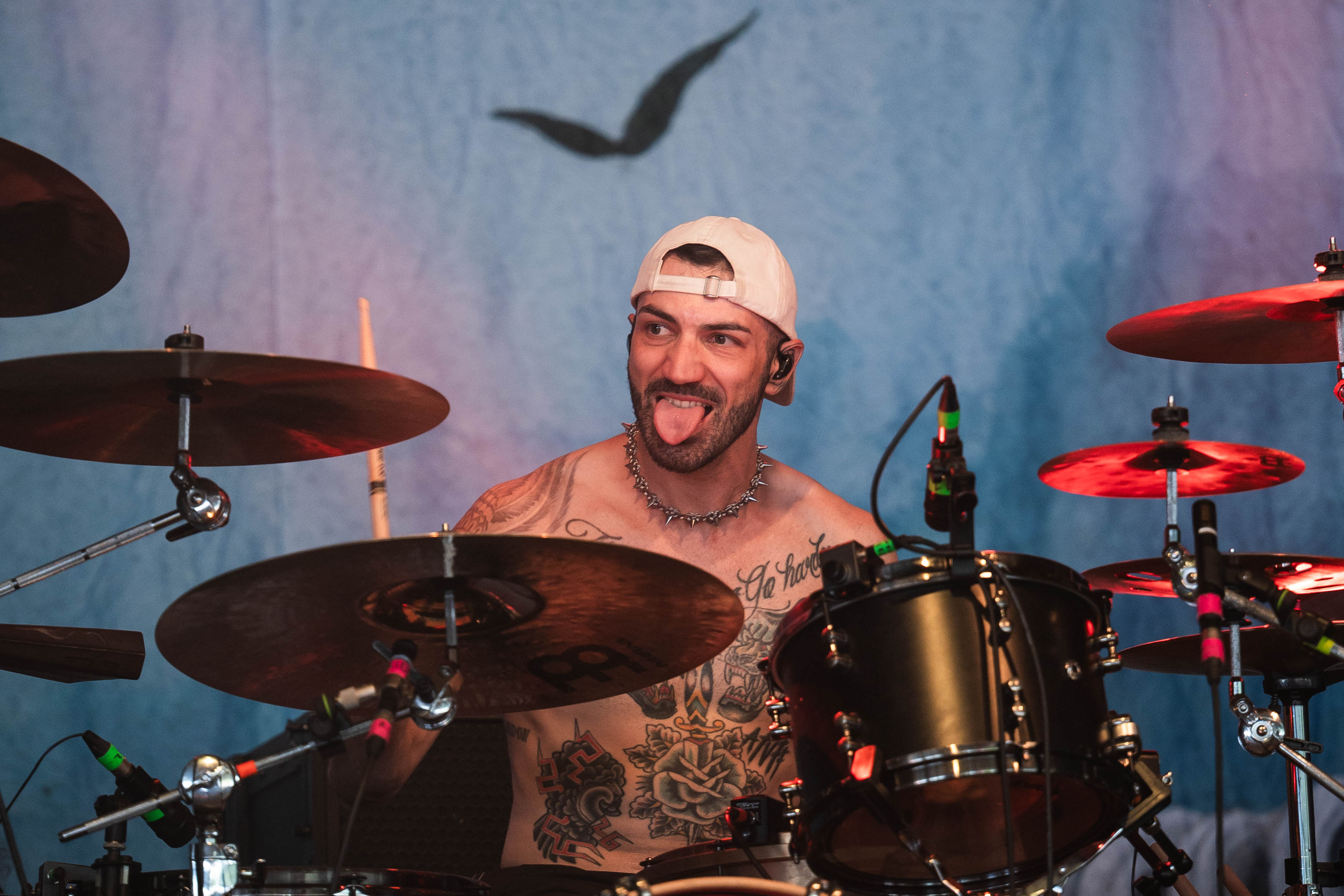
Kévin D'Agostino performing at Tons of Rock 2025

== Discography ==
Studio albums

- Hollow (2016)
- Fantasy (2018)
- Lost in the Waves (2021)
- The Darkest Place I've Ever Been (2025)

Other releases

- Live in Hellfest – live album (2016)
- Lost in the Waves (Complete Edition) – deluxe album (2022)
