= SpiritWorld =

American metal band

- Origin: Las Vegas
- Genres: Thrash metal; crossover thrash; death metal; punk rock (early); country (early)
- Years active: 2017–present
- Label: Century Media
- Members: Stu Folsom; Randy Moore; Matt Schrum; Nick Brundy; Preston Harper
- Past members: Justin Fornof
- Website: spiritworldprophet.com

SpiritWorld is an American heavy metal band formed in 2017. The band, described by frontman Stu Folsom as "death-western", plays mainly thrash metal with elements of death metal, but follows Western themes and imagery. To date, they have released three full-length albums.

The band are confirmed to be making an appearance at Welcome to Rockville, which will take place in Daytona Beach, Florida in May 2026.

== Members ==
- Stu Folsom – vocals
- Randy Moore – lead guitar
- Matt Schrum – rhythm guitar
- Nick Brundy – bass
- Preston Harper – drums

== Discography ==
=== Albums ===
- Pagan Rhythms (2020)
- Deathwestern (2022)
- Helldorado (2025)

=== EPs ===
- Demo (2017)
