= As Everything Unfolds =

British rock band

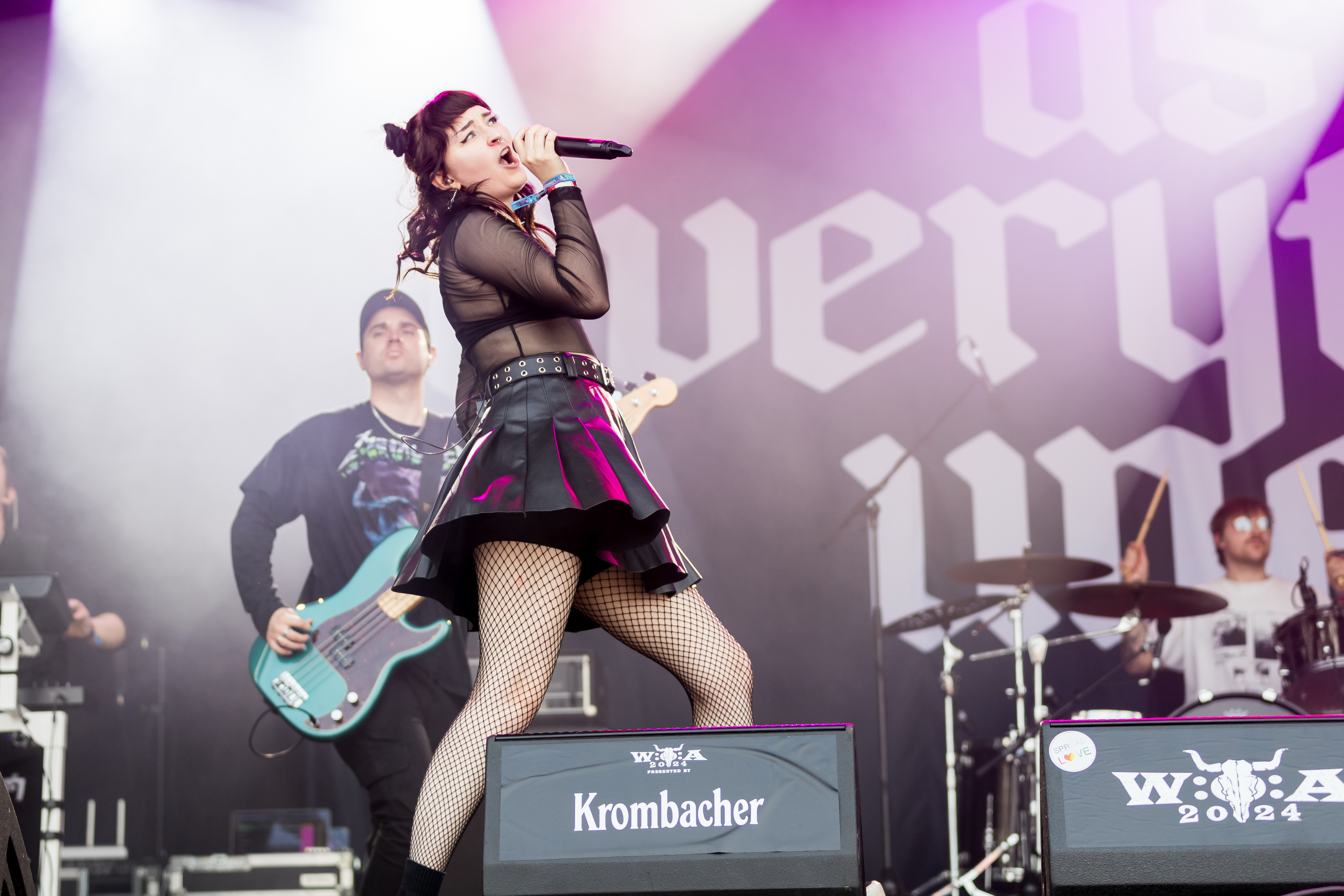
- As Everything Unfolds at Wacken Open Air Festival, August 2024

Background information
- Origin: High Wycombe, Buckinghamshire, England
- Genres: Post-hardcore; alternative rock; metalcore
- Years active: 2013–present
- Labels: Century Media; Long Branch
- Members: Charlie Rolfe; Adam Kerr; George Hunt
- Past members: Alex Meredith; Alex Paton; Owen Hill; Liam Burgoyne; Jamie Gowers; Jon Cassidy
- Website: aseverythingunfolds.com

As Everything Unfolds are a British rock band from High Wycombe, Buckinghamshire, England. Formed in 2013, the band's current members are vocalist Charlie Rolfe, guitarist Adam Kerr, and bassist George Hunt.

== History ==
The band formed in 2013 as an acoustic pairing of Alex Paton and current guitarist, Adam Kerr. They almost called the band Beneath Burning Skies before ultimately settling on As Everything Unfolds.

After bringing on Charlie Rolfe as their vocalist, the band self-released their debut EP Jekyll & Hyde in 2014, followed by their second EP Collide in 2017.

Their third EP, Closure, was released in 2018 to positive reviews. In September 2020, the band signed with Long Branch Records, an imprint of SPV Schallplatten. They released their first full-length album, Within Each Lies The Other, on 26 March 2021. On 13 May 2022, Owen Hill left the band on good terms to pursue new goals.

In January 2023, the band announced their second album, Ultraviolet, would be released on 21 April. The album was released to generally positive reviews and has since been nominated for 'Best Album Of The Year 2023' by Metal Hammer magazine.

Whilst at Slam Dunk Festival in 2024, the band confirmed that they were working on their third album, with 16 songs written for it at the time.

On 30 August 2024, the band confirmed via social media platforms that drummer Jamie Gowers had died on 26 August.

On 22 November 2024, the band went out on a tour across the UK and Europe supporting Bury Tomorrow alongside Make Them Suffer and Thornhill.

On 16 June 2025, the band announced they had signed with Century Media Records and would release their new single, "Set in Flow", the following day on 17 June 2025.

In January 2026, the band announced their third album, Did You Ask to Be Set Free?, would be released on 10 April.

On 31 July 2026, keyboardist Jon Cassidy announced that he'd be stepping away from the band to focus on a "different path" in his musical career.

== Musical style ==
The group's sound incorporates elements of alternative rock, post-hardcore, and metalcore, while lead singer Charlie Rolfe's vocal style has been described as a mixture of Hayley Williams, Amy Lee, Becca Macintyre, and Courtney LaPlante. The band have cited My Chemical Romance, Enter Shikari, Bring Me the Horizon, Korn, Slipknot, Periphery, Skrillex, Flyleaf, Thirty Seconds to Mars, Depeche Mode, Tears for Fears, Duran Duran, Adam & The Ants, Vukovi, Rivals, the Throwaway Scene, and South Arcade as influences.

== Members ==
Current

- Charlie Rolfe – lead vocals (2013–present)
- Adam Kerr – lead guitar (2013–present)
- George Hunt – bass (2013–present)

Current touring musicians

- Louis Doran – drums (2024–present)

Former

- Alex Meredith – lead vocals (2013)
- Alex Paton – rhythm guitar (2013–2015)
- Liam Burgoyne – drums (2016–2018)
- Owen Hill – rhythm guitar (2015–2022)
- Jamie Gowers – drums (2018–2024; died 2024)
- Jon Cassidy – keyboards, synthesisers, programming (2016–2026), drums (2013–2016)

Timeline

== Discography ==
As Everything Unfolds discography
- Studio albums: 3
- EPs: 3

=== Studio albums ===
| Year | Album | Label |
|---|---|---|
| 2021 | Within Each Lies the Other | Long Branch |
| 2023 | Ultraviolet | Long Branch |
| 2026 | Did You Ask to Be Set Free? | Century Media |

=== Extended plays ===
| Year | Album | Label |
|---|---|---|
| 2014 | Jekyll & Hyde | Self-released |
| 2017 | Collide | Self-released |
| 2018 | Closure | Self-released |
