= The Pretty Wild =

American metal band

- Origin: Las Vegas, Nevada
- Genres: Alternative metal, nu metalcore, pop metal, country rock (early)
- Years active: 2022–present
- Label: Sumerian
- Members: Jill "Jyl" Wylde; Julia "Jules" Wylde
- Website: wearetheprettywild.com

The Pretty Wild are an American alternative metal band from Las Vegas, Nevada, composed of sisters Jyl and Jules Wylde. The band is signed to Sumerian Records.

== History ==
The Pretty Wild are composed of sisters Jyl and Jules Wylde, based in Las Vegas, Nevada. The Wylde sisters are from Indiana, and experienced the death of their mother, who passed away from cancer. Growing up, the sisters moved to Nevada to live with their aunt. The duo played pop-cover sets in casinos prior to forming the group.

The Pretty Wild formed in 2022 and released their debut single titled "XANAX & CHAMPAGNE". The band would release additional singles before dropping their debut EP, Trigger Warning.

In 2024, The Pretty Wild released the song sLeepwALKeR, which saw some viral success on TikTok. The band would also participate in a cover of Metallica's The Unforgiven, which was done in tandem with Diamante and Kittie, for the Queen of the Ring film soundtrack.

In February 2025, The Pretty Wild released a song titled Kundalini in collaboration with the band Deadlands.

The Pretty Wild joined In This Moment as support on their Hell Hath No Fury tour, along with Wargasm and Kat Von D, playing festivals like Welcome to Rockville (where they made their live debut) and Inkcarceration.

In October 2025, The Pretty Wild released a single off the band's debut album titled "Afterlife", which featured a collaboration with the band Magnolia Park. The full-length album, zero.point.genesis, would be released in November 2025.

In December 2025, The Pretty Wild, Ladrones and Ankor were announced as support for Bloodywood's 2026 System Of A Brown tour, playing through the United States.

In 2026, The Pretty Wild toured the United Kingdom and Europe in support of Sleep Theory, including a performance at the Download Festival.

== Musical style ==
The Pretty Wild initially started as a country rock group, before evolving "into riotous alt-metal Valkyries on their debut full length Zero.Point.Genesis". Their sound is described as colliding "pit-crushing nu-core, sugary-sweet pop and Tim Burton-esque theatrics", as well as "pop-metal requiems" and "baddiecore".

== Discography ==
=== Albums ===
- zero.point.genesis (2025)

=== Extended Plays ===
- Trigger Warning (2023)

=== Singles ===
Song	Year	Peak chart positions	Albums
Song	Year	US Main.	Albums
"Renascence"	2024	—	Non-album singles
"Black Ops (M@nia)"	2024	—	Non-album singles
"Sleepwalker"	2024	—	Non-album singles
"Button Eyes"	2025	29	Zero.Point.Genesis
"Omens"	2025	—	Zero.Point.Genesis
"Living Ded"	2025	—	Zero.Point.Genesis
"Paradox"	2025	—	Zero.Point.Genesis
"Afterlife" (with Magnolia Park)	2025	—	Zero.Point.Genesis
