= Magnolia Park (band) =

American rock band

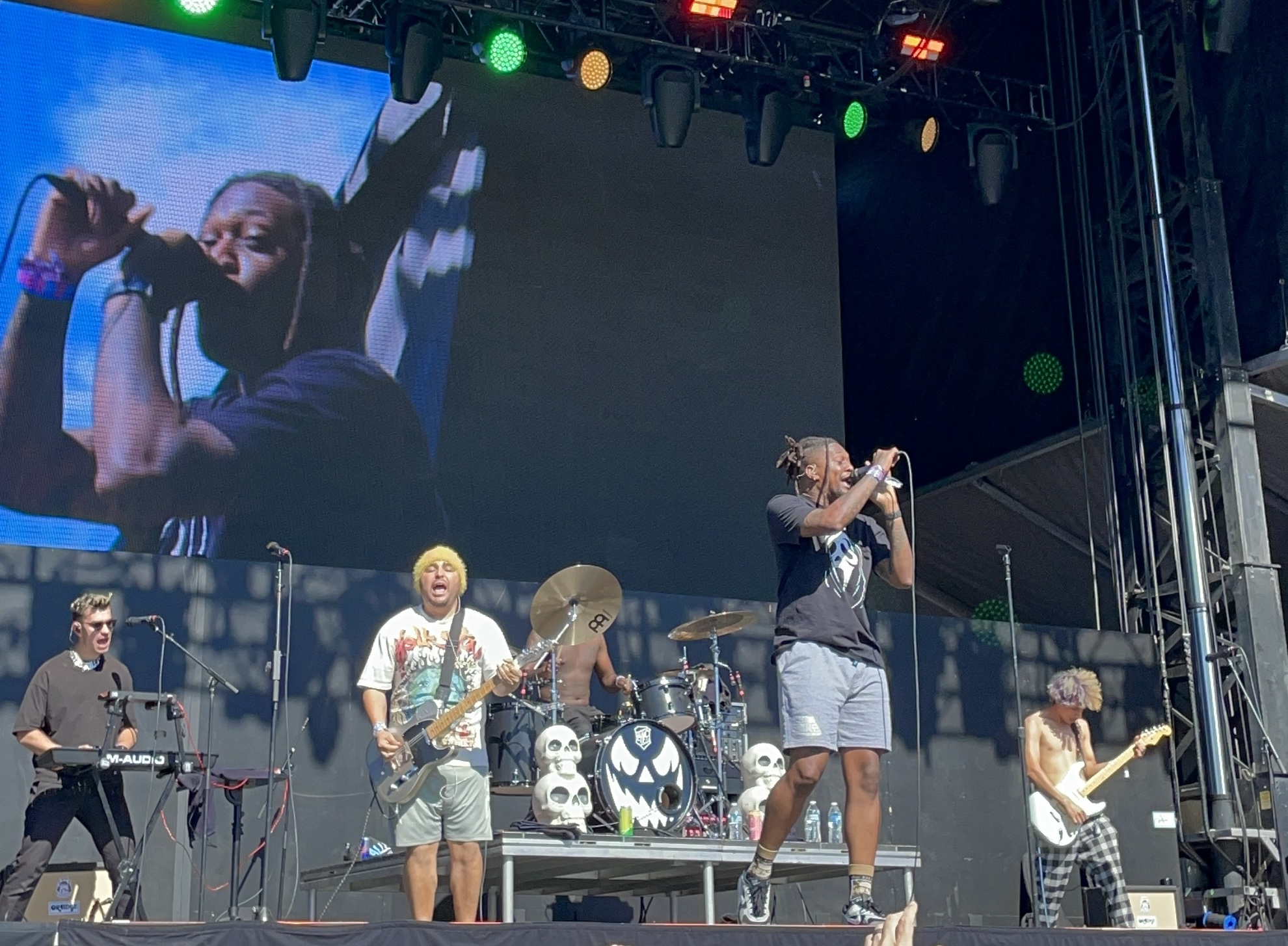
- Magnolia Park performing at When We Were Young Fest in October 2023

Background information
- Origin: Orlando, Florida, U.S.
- Genres: Post-hardcore; metalcore; pop-punk; nu metal; alternative rock; emo
- Years active: 2018–present
- Label: Epitaph
- Members: Joshua Roberts; Tristan Torres; Freddie Criales; Joe Horsham; Vincent Ernst
- Past members: Scott Ellis; Jared Kay
- Website: magnoliaparkband.com

Magnolia Park is an American rock band formed in Orlando, Florida in 2018. They are currently signed to Epitaph Records.

== Career ==
=== Early Years and Vacant (2018-2019) ===
Magnolia Park was formed in 2018 in Orlando, Florida by childhood friends Tristian Torres and Freddie Criales. The name Magnolia Park comes from the location where Criales broke his leg while riding his Razor scooter. The band released their first single, "Patience," on August 1, 2018.

In 2019, Magnolia Park released three more singles: "Desperate" on January 3, "October" on July 12, and "Pumpkin Eater" on August 2, which were bundled into first EP, Vacant, on January 25, 2020. They released an additional single, "Hangover Heaven," on November 15. The following day, November 16, they performed at the final Hope Fest, headlined by Capstan, in Lakeside, Florida.

=== COVID-19 and TikTok Success (2020-2021) ===
The band continued to release singles with "Outside" on January 17, 2020. Magnolia Park had intended to tour throughout the US in 2020 following the release of their first EP, but the COVID-19 pandemic prevented them from doing so. From lockdown, they released their biggest single yet on July 24 with "Sick of it All," followed by singles "Sunburst" on September 4 and "Houdini" on October 16. Much like many other burgeoning bands unable to tour during the coronavirus pandemic, Magnolia Park joined the social media platform TikTok to promote their music. The band posted their first video to the platform on October 23, 2020, using footage from their "Sick of it All" music video. As of 2025, the post has garnered over 11,000 views. Magnolia Park continued to create and post videos on the platform and amassed a significant following.

Their follow-up single, "Love Me," featuring emo veteran Kellin Quinn of Sleeping with Sirens, was the final release on November 27, 2020 before their sophomore EP, Dream Eater, was released on March 19, 2021. Dream Eater contained two previously released songs, "Sick of it All" and "Love Me;" three new songs "Singing," "TDH2S" featuring Oliver Baxxter of Broadside, and "Back on my Bullshit" featuring iamjakehill; and a remix of "Sunburst" featuring glimmers. On June 29, Magnolia Park announced via a Facebook post that they would be supporting LiL Lotus on the Error Boy Tour of the southwestern United States. At their first tour stop at The Echo in Los Angeles, California, on August 19, the band was approached by Epitaph Records to sign to their label, officially announcing their signing on September 30. Then-bassist Jared Kay said of the opportunity, “Epitaph felt like the perfect fit for us, and we’re really excited for the band to be moving forward with them.”

=== Halloween Mixtape and Heart Eater EP (2021-2022) ===
On October 29, 2021, Magnolia Park released their first album-length mixtape, Halloween Mixtape, on streaming services along with the music video of the first single, "Liar," with the physical album releasing April 1, 2022. In celebration of the album's release, the band played a hometown show at The Abbey, with a festival appearance at Unsilent Night in Dallas, TX.

To gain exposure and in support of their new album, Magnolia Park embarked on a heavy touring schedule. First, they supported Mayday Parade on the North American leg of their self-titled album 11th anniversary tour with Real Friends in spring 2022. Shortly after tour, they announced their EP, Heart Eater, with the lead single "Feel Something" featuring Derek Sanders of Mayday Parade. Of the track, guitarist Tristian Torres said, "The inspiration behind Feel Something is about wanting to live in the moment and the desire to be present."

That summer, they made a brief stint in the UK at Slam Dunk Festival and a handful of UK shows before returning to the States for the first half of the 2022 iteration of Sad Summer Fest. Then, Magnolia Park supported Sum 41 and Simple Plan on the latter, western-US leg of their Blame Canada tour. In the fall, they jumped on A Day to Remember's Just Some More Shows tour with The Used and Movements.

=== Baku's Revenge, Halloween Mixtape II, and MoonEater & SoulEater EPs (2022-2024) ===
In the midst of touring with A Day to Remember, Magnolia Park announced their first official album, Baku's Revenge, on October 4 to be released a month later. Kerrang! magazine gave the album 4/5 lauding the band's songwriting ability and the album's "unflinching honesty." New Noise gave it 4.5/5 stars writing that "the band can craft great songs which sport meaningful lyrics and catchy hooks that touch on social and personal issues, the vocals switch between solid singing and strained yells, and it seems like a lot of care was put into Baku’s Revenge." Following the release, they set off on their first headlining tour across the Midwest, East Coast, and South with support from Arrows in Action and poptropicaslutz!, as well as First and Forever. After this first leg and the main album reaching 15 million streams, they released the Baku's Revenge Deluxe on April 14, 2023. Following a brief UK stint in August, including Reading & Leeds Festival, Magnolia Park would continue their US headliner up the West Cast with support from poptropicaslutz!, TX2, and 408, including a stop at Las Vegas' When We Were Young Festival.

Between the UK and US tour stops, Magnolia Park dropped double EPs, MoonEater and SoulEater, on August 18, 2023. Noisescape Magazine described the pair as "MoonEater delves into a dark and ethereal realm, drawing inspiration from metalcore with crushing breakdowns and distorted guitars ... On the other hand, SoulEater introduces a brighter mood with uplifting lyrics, employing textured alt-pop production and dreamy synth soundscapes reminiscent of the 2000s pop-punk bands that influenced them."

In the final days of the Baku's Revenge Tour, Magnolia Park dropped their next mixtape installment, Halloween Mixtape II. Guitarist Freddie Cirales explained, they "like to call it mixtape because, in our eyes, it’s more like a test. And the mixtapes allow us to explore different sounds and try different things without feeling the need to be cohesive, since a mixtape is generally not cohesive. And then we’re just trying stuff and having fun on them."

To close out 2023, Magnolia Park headed to Australia for the first time for the Good Things Festival on December 1 in Melbourne, December 2 in Sydney, and December 3 in Brisbane. During this stint, they also supported Pvris at three of the Festival's sideshows.

=== VAMP (2024-present) ===
On June 26, 2024, Magnolia Park debuted what would be their first single titled "Shallow," accompanied by the cryptic social media message: “A New era is born. Leave you in the shadows.” Following the release, Magnolia Park co-headlined the inaugural Idobi Radio Summer School Tour, along with Stand Atlantic, The Home Team, and Scene Queen. In the midst of tour, Mag Park briefly departed from their new, darker sound to cover "I2I" from A Goofy Movie for Disney's pop-punk album A Whole New Sound

On December 9, 2024, Magnolia Park announced a headlining North American tour with support from Hot Milk, Savage Hands, and South Arcade, dubbed the VAMP Tour, another signal to this new era. The following month, Magnolia Park began 2025 by announcing their fourth studio album VAMP. The album is said to be "a neo-gothic concept album that the band promises to be rich in world-building and compelling storytelling about a futuristic setting known as the Nocturne Nexus." The album was released on April 11, 2025 with an accompanying story website.

The VAMP album and story follows Aurora X1 a half-human, half-cyborg warrior and leader of the rebel group the Shadow Breakers in the realm of Nocturne Nexus. The Shadow Breakers fight to free their world from the malevolent Shadow Cult, led by Obsidian, who seeks to merge the physical world with the Shadow Realm, and is also Aurora's biological father. The band features as in-world freedom fighters with mystical powers, known as The Nightborne.

The concept behind the album is influenced by the band's occult aesthetic and their love of anime, specifically Vampire Hunter D.

== Band members ==
=== Current ===
- Joshua Roberts – lead vocals (2019–present)
- Tristan Torres – rhythm guitar (2020–present), backing vocals (2019–present), bass (2019–2020)
- Freddie Criales – lead guitar, backing vocals (2019–present), rhythm guitar (2019–2020)
- Joe Horsham – drums, percussion (2020–present)
- Vincent Ernst – keyboards, programming, backing vocals (2020–present), bass (2024–present)

=== Former ===
- Scott Ellis – drums, percussion (2019–2020)
- Jared Kay – bass guitar (2020–2023)

== Discography ==
=== Albums ===
- Halloween Mixtape (2021)
- Baku's Revenge (2022)
- Baku's Revenge (Deluxe Edition) (2023)
- Halloween Mixtape II (2023)
- VAMP (2025)

=== EPs ===
Title	Details
Vacant	Released: January 25, 2020
Dream Eater	Released: March 19, 2021
Heart Eater	Released: June 10, 2022
MoonEater	Released: August 18, 2023
SoulEater	Released: August 18, 2023

=== Singles ===
List of singles as lead artist, showing year released and album name
Title	Year	Peak chart positions			Album
Title	Year	US Hot Hard Rock	US Main.	US Rock Air.	Album
"Patience"	2018	—	—	—	Non-album single
"Desperate"	2019	—	—	—	Vacant
"October"	2019	—	—	—	Vacant
"Pumpkin Eater"	2019	—	—	—	Non-album singles
"Hangover Heaven"	2019	—	—	—	Non-album singles
"Outside"	2020	—	—	—	Non-album singles
"Sick of It All"	2020	—	—	—	Dream Eater
"Sunburst"	2020	—	—	—	Dream Eater
"Houdini"	2020	—	—	—	Non-album single
"Love Me"	2020	—	—	—	Dream Eater
"Tonight"	2021	—	—	—	Halloween Mixtape
"Back Home"	2021	—	—	—	Halloween Mixtape
"2009"	2021	—	—	—	Halloween Mixtape
"I'll Give You the Stars"	2022	—	—	—	Halloween Mixtape
"Storm Clouds"	2022	—	—	—	Halloween Mixtape
"Deja Vu"	2022	—	—	—	Halloween Mixtape
"Tokyo"	2022	—	—	—	Heart Eater
"Feel Something"	2022	—	—	—	Heart Eater/Baku's Revenge
"Don't Be Racist"	2022	—	—	—	Baku's Revenge
"I Should've Listened To My Friends"	2022	—	—	—	Baku's Revenge
"Addison Rae"	2022	—	—	—	Baku's Revenge
"Do or Die"	2023	—	—	—	MoonEater/Halloween Mixtape II
"Homicide"	2023	—	—	—	MoonEater
"Manic"	2023	—	—	—	Halloween Mixtape II
"Animal"	2023	—	—	—	Halloween Mixtape II
"The Witching Hour"	2023	—	—		Halloween Mixtape II
"Hellstar"	2024	—	—	—	Non-album single
"Shallow"	2024	10	10	45	Vamp
"The Void"	2024	—	—	—	Non-album singles
"Oblivion Eyes"	2024	—	—	—	Non-album singles
"Cult"	2025	—	—	—	Vamp
"Worship" (featuring PLVTINUM & Vana)	2025	—	—	—	Vamp
"Shadow Talk"	2025	—	—	—	Vamp
"Chasing Shadows"	2025	—	—	—	Nights After Vamp
"High"	2026	—	—	—	Nights After Vamp
"Dangerous"	2026	—	—	—	Nights After Vamp

=== Music videos ===
Year	Title	Director(s)
2020	"Sick of It All"	Andy Oceans
2020	"Sunburst"	BryamBryam
2020	"Houdini"	Evan Draper
2020	"Love Me"	Evan Draper
2021	"Back on My Bullshit"	Evan Draper
2021	"TDH2S"	Evan Draper
2021	"Tonight"	Evan Draper
2021	"Back Home"	Evan Draper
2021	"Liar"	Evan Draper
2021	"10 for 10"	Evan Draper
2021	"2009"	Drew Russ
2021	"The End"	Evan Draper
2022	"Kids Like Us"	Evan Draper
2022	"Tokyo"	Orie McGuiness
2022	"Feel Something"	Evan Draper
2022	"Serious"	Evan Draper
2022	"Gravedigger"	Evan Draper
2022	"Don't Be Racist"	Unknown
2022	"I Should've Listened To My Friends"	Benjamin Lieber
2022	"Addison Rae"	Evan Draper
2022	"Misfits"	Shane C. Drake
2022	"Radio Reject"	Cody LaPlant
2023	"Homicide"	Evan Draper
2023	"Manic"	Jake Johnston
2023	"Breathing"	Unknown
2023	"Blud Luv"	Evan Draper
2023	"Animal"	Orie McGuiness
2023	"Candles"	DJay Brawner
2023	"Fell In Love On Halloween"	Joshua Roberts
2024	"Shallow"	Orie McGuiness and Tanner Gordon
2024	"I2I"	Unknown
2024	"The Void"	Orie McGuiness
2025	"Shadow Talk"	Orie McGuiness
2026	"High"	Max Moore

=== As featured artist ===
- Nice to Meet You - 408
- Mark Hoppus - 408, Kellin Quinn
- Deadzone - Cameron Sanderson
- How Could You - Futuristic
- WHITE FLAG - Ryan Oakes
- The Credits - Arrows in Action, Loveless
- Manic - 408
- Afterlife - The Pretty Wild
- Murder Scene - TX2
- Good Girl - Joshua Roberts and Ari Abdul

=== Other appearances ===
- A Whole New Sound (2024) covering "I2I" from A Goofy Movie

== Concert tours ==
=== Headlining ===
- Baku's Revenge Tour (2023)
- "2024 tour"
- The VAMP Tour (2025)
