= Calva Louise =

English rock band

- Origin: London, England
- Genres: Alternative rock; post-hardcore; alternative metal
- Years active: 2016–present
- Label: Mascot
- Members: Jess Allanic; Ben Parker; Alizon Taho

Calva Louise is an English rock band formed in London in 2016. They comprise lead singer Jess Allanic, drummer Ben Parker, and bassist Alizon Taho. The band has released four full-length albums, Rhinoceros (2019), Euphoric (2021), Over the Threshold (2023), and Edge of the Abyss (2025). They have performed internationally, including at festivals in the United Kingdom, Europe, and the United States as well as performing solo and tandem with other artists. Like the members of the band, their music is multilingual. The band was dubbed one of the "Artists You Need to Know" in 2024 by BBC Radio 1.

== History ==
Calva Louise was formed after the three members, each originally from different continents, relocated independently to the United Kingdom. Allanic is from Venezuela, Taho from France, and Parker from New Zealand. All three members cite the UK’s music culture as a major factor in their decision to move, despite having no prior connections or family in the country.

Allanic's early interest in science fiction began in her childhood in Guarenas, where she created a fictional world that would later inspire the band's conceptual universe. Facing a deteriorating political and economic climate, she convinced her parents to support her move to France when she was 15. She settled in Rouen and attended school next to the convent where she lived. It was there that she met Taho, who had studied cello before teaching himself guitar. The two began playing together, performing at school contests and small events. Despite the fact that Taho spoke no English and Allanic very little, the pair began taking trips to the UK to pursue music more seriously. There, they met Parker, who had relocated to the UK at 14. Despite their language barriers, the trio formed a band in London.

Calva Louise began gaining momentum with their energetic live performances, including support slots for artists such as Albert Hammond Jr., Spring King, and Anteros, and an extensive UK tour with The Blinders. The band operates independently, without backing from a traditional record label. They self-produce their recordings, construct custom equipment, and develop their own visual materials, including costumes for their music videos. Their approach includes digital tools such as CGI, often incorporated into music videos directed and edited by Allanic. She taught herself video production and the 3D graphics software Blender during the COVID-19 lockdown period.

Calva Louise gained early recognition through live performances at major UK festivals and through touring with other alternative and rock acts. They have received support from BBC Radio 1, Kerrang!, and other music media outlets, and have gradually built an international following through consistent releases and multimedia storytelling.

== Musical styles and influences ==
Calva Louise’s music reflects the members’ diverse cultural backgrounds. Allanic’s influences include Latin American folk music, metal, and hip-hop, while Taho and Parker contribute elements from European rock music and alternative rock traditions. Their combined influences result in a hybrid musical style incorporating punk, electronica, nu-metal, and post-hardcore.

The band has also released several graphic novels, with art by Allanic. She cites among her influences James O’Barr, Frank Miller, and Sean Murphy who frequently write and illustrate their own stories, as well as writing by Joe Hill and Jason Aaron and art by Rafael Albuquerque and R.M Guera.

The band frequently alternates between English and Spanish, and their work often explores ideas of identity, duality, and alternate realities. Musical inspirations cited by the group include System of a Down, Muse, Queens of the Stone Age, Calle 13, Molotov, El Cuarteto de Nos, and Simón Díaz.

== Themes ==
The group has expressed that their multinational background and shared experience as emigrants influence their themes of identity and alienation. They also embrace the notion that music is and should be a medium for resisting uniformity and affirming individuality and creative freedom.

A defining feature of Calva Louise is the fictional universe that informs much of their work, developed by Allanic from the age of ten. The story underpins several of the band's albums and music videos and their graphic novels. The band’s name is derived from the story's central character, Louise.

The term Calva ("bald" in Spanish) refers to the 1959 absurdist play The Bald Soprano by Eugène Ionesco. This play, with themes of fractured communication and a critique of the dangers of social conformity, was also a major inspiration for the bands debut album.

== Discography ==
=== Studio albums ===
Title	Details
Rhinoceros	Released: 2019; Label: Modern Sky Entertainment
Euphoric	Released: 2021; Label: 300 Entertainment
Over the Threshold	Released: 2023; Label:
Edge of the Abyss	Released: 2025; Label: Mascot Records

=== Extended plays ===
Title	Details
Interlude For The Borderline Unsettled	Released: 2019; Self-released
Popurrí	Released: 2020; Self-released
