= Vukovi =

Scottish pop-punk band

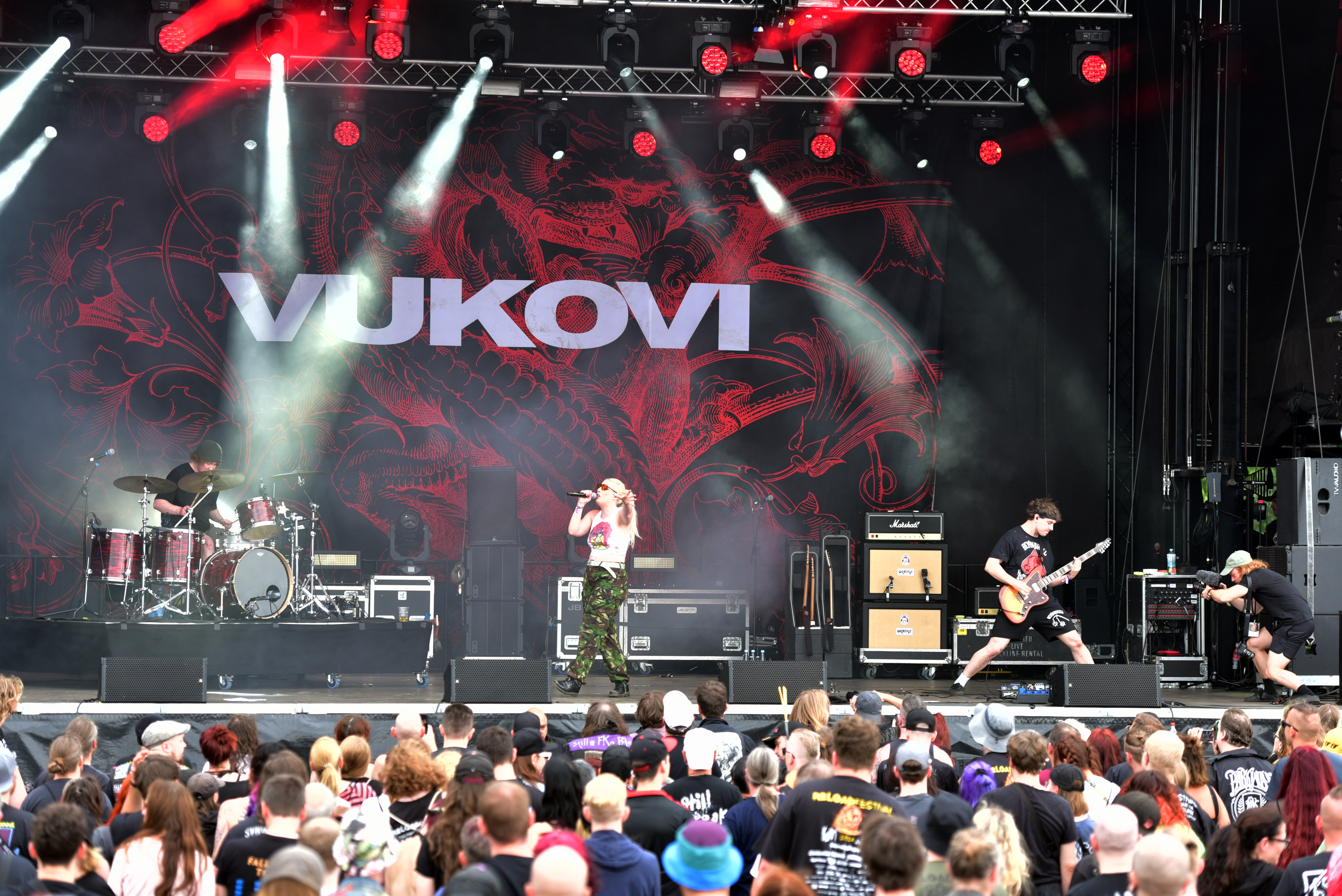
- Vukovi performing live in 2024.

Background information
- Origin: Kilwinning, North Ayrshire, Scotland
- Genres: Pop-punk; noise pop
- Years active: 2010–present
- Labels: SharpTone; LAB; VKVI
- Members: Janine Shilstone; Hamish Reilly
- Past members: Jason Trotter; Colin Irving; Martyn Lynch

Vukovi (stylised as VUKOVI) is a Scottish rock band from Kilwinning, North Ayrshire, Scotland, consisting of singer Janine Shilstone and guitarist Hamish Reilly. The band released their self-titled debut album Vukovi on 10 Mar 2017. Their most recent album titled My God Has Got A Gun was released on 24 January 2025.

Before taking its current name, the band was previously named Wolves.

== History ==
=== Wolves ===
Guitarist Hamish Reilly, bassist Jason Trotter and drummer Martyn Lynch played together in a Scottish rock band called Wolves, alongside another member who served as the lead vocalist. However the band became dissatisfied with their singer, who subsequently left the group. At around the same time, singer Janine Shilstone was fired from another band. When Shilstone auditioned for Wolves in 2010, everyone instantly felt the chemistry. Shilstone's arrival affected the sound of Wolves so much, they decided to change their name to Vukovi (which means "wolves" in Serbo-Croatian).

=== Vukovi ===
On 10 March 2017, Vukovi released their debut self-titled album.

On 22 November 2018, the band released a statement announcing the departure of bassist Jason Trotter as he wanted to move on. The statement which announced Trotter's departure stated the separation was peaceful and "there is no bad vibes". According to Trotter's Instagram page, he is working as a barber in Glasgow. At around the same time, drummer Colin Irving also left the band for unspecified reasons, with Martin Sharples-Johnston taking up drumming duties for touring only.

Vukovi have cited influences including Bring Me the Horizon, Rage Against the Machine, Queens of the Stone Age, Death From Above 1979, the 1975, Deaf Havana, Paramore, the Naked & Famous, PJ Harvey, Ben Howard, Incubus, Florence Welch, Sia, Funeral for a Friend, Foals and Battles.

=== Fall Better ===
On 24 January 2020, Vukovi released their second album, Fall Better.

=== Nula ===
On 7 October 2022, Vukovi released their third album, Nula.

=== My God Has Got A Gun ===
On 24 January 2025, Vukovi released their fourth album, My God Has Got A Gun.

== Members ==
=== Current members ===
- Janine Shilstone - vocals (2010–present)
- Hamish Reilly - lead guitar (2010–present)
- Martin Sharples-Johnston - drums (2012-present; touring only)

=== Former members ===
- Jason Trotter - bass (2010-2018)
- Colin Irving - drums (2012-2018)
- Martin Lynch - drums (2010-2012)

== Discography ==
=== Studio albums ===
List of studio albums, with selected details
Title	Album details
Vukovi	Released: 10 March 2017; Label: LAB; Formats: CD, digital download, streaming
Fall Better	Released: 24 January 2020; Label: VKVI; Formats: CD, LP, digital download, streaming
Nula	Released: 7 October 2022; Label: LAB; Formats: CD, LP, digital download, streaming
My God Has Got a Gun	Released: 24 January 2025; Label: SharpTone Records; Formats: CD, LP, digital download, streaming

=== EPs ===
Title	EP details
It Looked So Good On Me...	Released: 30 September 2011; Label: EmuBands; Formats: Digital download, streaming
...But I Won't Wear You Again	Released: 9 January 2012; Label: EmuBands; Formats: Digital download, streaming
Sweet Swears	Released: 22 October 2012; Label: EmuBands; Formats: Digital download, streaming

=== Singles ===
Single	Year	Album
"So Long Gone"	2014	Non-album single
"Bouncy Castle"	2014	VUKOVI
"Boy George"	2016	VUKOVI
"Animal"	2016	VUKOVI
"La Di La"	2016	VUKOVI
"Weirdo"	2017	VUKOVI
"And He Lost His Mind"	2017	VUKOVI
"C.L.A.U.D.I.A"	2019	Fall Better
"Wired (Forbes & Reilly Remix)"	2019	Non-album single
"Behave"	2019	Fall Better
"All That Candy"	2019	Fall Better
"Run/Hide"	2019	Fall Better
"Violent Minds"	2020	Fall Better
"SLO"	2020	NULA
"KILL IT"	2021	NULA
"HURT"	2021	NULA
"LASSO"	2022	NULA
"HADES"	2022	NULA
"I EXIST"	2022	NULA
"QUENCH"	2022	NULA
"CREEP HEAT"	2023	Non-album single
"MERCY KILL"	2023	Non-album single
"GUNGHO"	2024	MY GOD HAS GOT A GUN
"MISTY ECSTASY"	2024	MY GOD HAS GOT A GUN
"SNO"	2024	MY GOD HAS GOT A GUN
"MY GOD HAS GOT A GUN"	2025	MY GOD HAS GOT A GUN
