= Amos (name) =

- Pronunciation: UK: /ˈeɪmɒs/, US: /-məs/
- Gender: Male
- Language: Hebrew

Amos (Hebrew: עָמוֹס) is both a given name and a surname made popular by the Hebrew Bible/Old Testament prophet. It may refer to:

== Given name ==
=== People ===
- Amos Bronson Alcott (1799–1888), American educator, father of American novelist Louisa May Alcott
- Amos E. Buss (1814–1872), American politician from Ohio
- Amos Dolbear (1837–1910), American inventor
- Amos Eiran, Israeli President of the University of Haifa
- Amos Ferguson (1920–2009), Bahamian folk artist
- Amos Frishman (born 1964), Israeli basketball player
- Amos Frumkin (born 1953), Israeli geologist
- Amos Gilad (1941–2010), Israeli Olympic runner
- Amos Gitai (born 1950), Israeli film director
- Amos Grodzinowsky (born 1940), Israeli Olympic runner
- Amos Grunebaum (born 1950), obstetrician and gynecologist
- Amos Guttman (1954–1993), Israeli film director
- Amos T. Hall (1896–1971), lawyer, judge, and civil rights leader
- Amos Horev (born 1924), Israeli Major-General, nuclear scientist, and President of Technion – Israel Institute of Technology
- Amos E. Joel Jr. (1918–2008), American electrical engineer and inventor
- Amos Kairuz, birth name of Danny Thomas (1912–1991), American nightclub comedian and television and film actor and producer
- Amos Kipruto (born 1992), Kenyan long-distance runner
- Amos Lapidot (1934–2019), Israeli fighter pilot, 10th commander of the Israeli Air Force, and President of Technion – Israel Institute of Technology
- Amos Lawrence (1786–1852), American merchant and philanthropist
- Amos A. Lawrence (1814–1846), American philanthropist and abolitionist
- Amos Lawrence Jr., (born 1958) American football player
- Amos Lee (born 1978), American singer-songwriter
- Amos Magee (born 1971), American soccer player, coach, and front office
- Amos Mansdorf (born 1965), Israeli tennis player
- Amos Meller (1938–2007), Israeli composer and conductor
- Amos Miller (c. 1865–1888), lynching victim
- Amos Ojo (1962–2025), Nigerian wrestler
- Amos O'Neal (born 1961), American politician
- Amos Oz (1939–2018), Israeli writer, novelist, and journalist
- Amos Poe (1949–2025), American film director and screenwriter
- Amos Quick (born 1968), American politician from North Carolina
- Amos Augustus Richardson, Canadian politician
- Amos Shapira (born 1949), Israeli former president of El Al Airlines, Cellcom, and the University of Haifa
- Amos Urban Shirk (1890?–1956), American businessman, author and reader of encyclopedias
- Amos Singletary (1721–1806), American mill operator, lawyer, Anti-Federalist
- Amos Smith (1944–2025), American chemist and academic
- Amos Tversky (1937–1996), Israeli pioneer of cognitive science
- Amos Yadlin (born 1951), former Israeli Air Force general
- Amos Yarkoni (1920–1991), Arab Israeli officer in the Israel Defense Forces
- Amos Yee (born 1998), Singaporean convicted sex offender and former blogger, YouTuber and child actor
- Amos Zereoué (born 1976), American football player

=== Religious figures ===
- Amos (prophet), one of the twelve minor prophets in the Hebrew Bible

=== Fictional characters ===
- Amos Burke, title character of Burke's Law, a 1960s American television series
- Amos Burton, one of the main characters in the fictional universe of The Expanse (novel series). He serves as the mechanic and general muscle of the protagonists' ship, the Rocinante.
- Amos Diggory, fictional character in the Harry Potter books and films
- Amos Jones, a title character of Amos 'n' Andy, an American radio show from the 1920s to the 1950s
- Amos Moses, title character of the 1970 single by Jerry Reed
- Amos Tupper, the original sheriff on the 1980s American TV series Murder, She Wrote
- Amos Slade, fictional character in The Fox and the Hound
- Amos Voll, A suspect in Ready or Not.
- Amos Walker, a fictional private detective in novels and short stories written by Loren D. Estleman.

== Nickname ==
- Anthony Irl "Amos" Martin (born 1949), American former National Football League player

== Surname ==
- Alan Amos (born 1952), British politician
- Alf Amos (1893–1959), English footballer
- Ben Amos (born 1990), English football goalkeeper
- Bruce Amos (born 1946), Canadian chess player
- Dan Amos (born 1951), chief executive officer of insurer Aflac
- Danny Amos (born 1987), South African born-Israeli association football player
- Emma Amos (disambiguation), multiple people
- Frederick T. Amos, American politician
- Hallam Amos (born 1994), Welsh rugby player
- Henry B. Amos (1869–1946), Scottish activist and draper
- James F. Amos (born 1946), United States Marine Corps general
- Janet Amos (born 1944), Canadian actress, director, educator and playwright
- Jerome Amos Jr. (born 1954), American politician
- Jill Amos (1927–2017), New Zealand politician and community leader
- John Amos (1939–2024), American actor
- Lowell Amos (1943–2022), American murderer
- Luke Amos (born 1997), English footballer
- Martin John Amos (born 1941), American Catholic Bishop
- Mason Amos (born 2004), Filipino-Australian basketball player
- Michael Amos (swimmer) (1932–2003), New Zealand swimmer
- Nathan Amos (born 1979), South African born-Israeli international rugby union player
- Ruth Amos (born 1989), British entrepreneur and inventor
- Stephen K. Amos (born 1967), English stand-up comedian
- Terri Utley née Amos (born 1962), American beauty queen and motivational speaker
- Tori Amos (born Myra Ellen Amos, 1963), American pianist and singer-songwriter
- Trey Amos (born 2002), American football player
- Wally Amos (1936–2024), American entrepreneur, actor and book writer
- Walter Amos (1899–1967), English footballer
- Valerie Amos (born 1954), British peer

== See also ==
- Amos (disambiguation)
