= Sean Long (guitarist) =

American guitarist

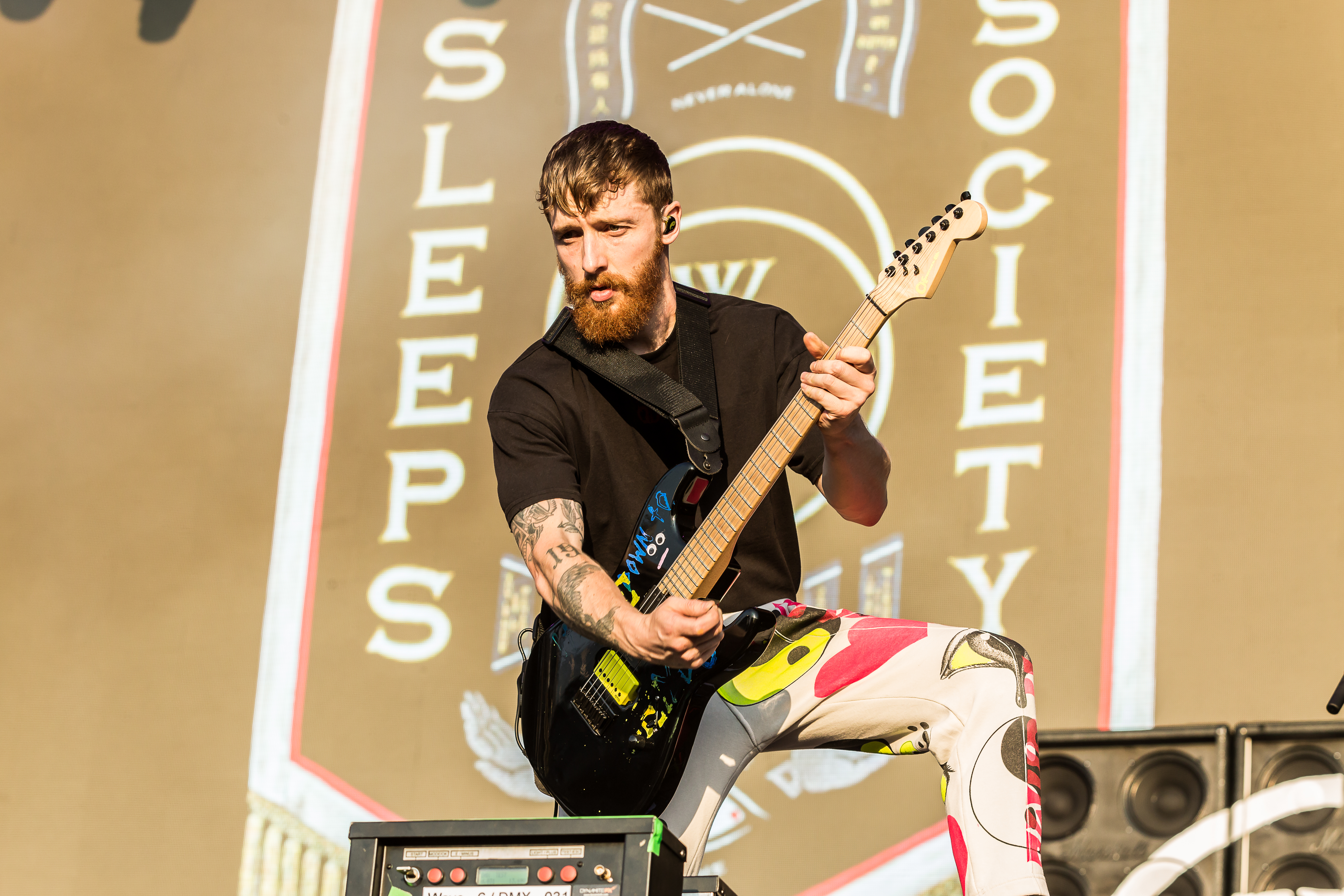
- Long performing in 2023

Background information
- Born: 18 June 1990 (age 36)
- Origin: Sheffield, South Yorkshire, England
- Genre: Metalcore
- Occupations: Musician; songwriter
- Instruments: Guitar
- Years active: 2004–present
- Member of: While She Sleeps

Sean Long is a British guitarist and songwriter. He is the lead guitarist and a founding member of the metalcore band While She Sleeps.

== Early life ==
While attending Eckington School around Sheffield, England, Long began learning how to play guitar because his close friends were in a band and he wanted to join. His first guitar was a sunburst Squier Stratocaster purchased from British retailer Argos.

== Career ==
In 2006, Long founded the band While She Sleeps with vocalist Jordan Widdowson, drummer Adam Savage, bassist Aaran McKenzie and fellow guitarist Mat Welsh, described as being "best mates since school". The group decided to focus on music full time in 2009. From late 2009 through to 2011 the band toured heavily throughout the UK and eventually into Europe.

The band's debut album, This Is the Six, was released on August 13, 2012, and won an award for Best British Newcomer by Karrang. Sony Music released the album. Long later recalled being disappointed about the lack of passion shown by the representatives of Sony he worked with and that this negative experience influenced the band's later decision to release an album independently.

This Is the Six involved multiple tours in 2012 and 2013, including shows in Australia, America and Canada. In 2012, the band joined the annual traveling rock music festival Warped Tour. As I Lay Dying was also part of the tour that year and Long recalls being influenced by guitarist Phil Sgrosso's choice of gear. He points to Sgrosso as a large influence for his own playing style.

During Warped Tour, the band wrote material for their second full-length album but also saw vocalist Taylor suffer from vocal problems, leading to him undergoing throat surgery and recovery. Long recalls this timeframe as when the years of the music touring lifestyle pressure took a toll on his mental state and he considered leaving the band. Eastern philosophy influenced his decision to continue making music and also influenced a single released in 2022, "Nervous" featuring Simon Neil on guest vocals.

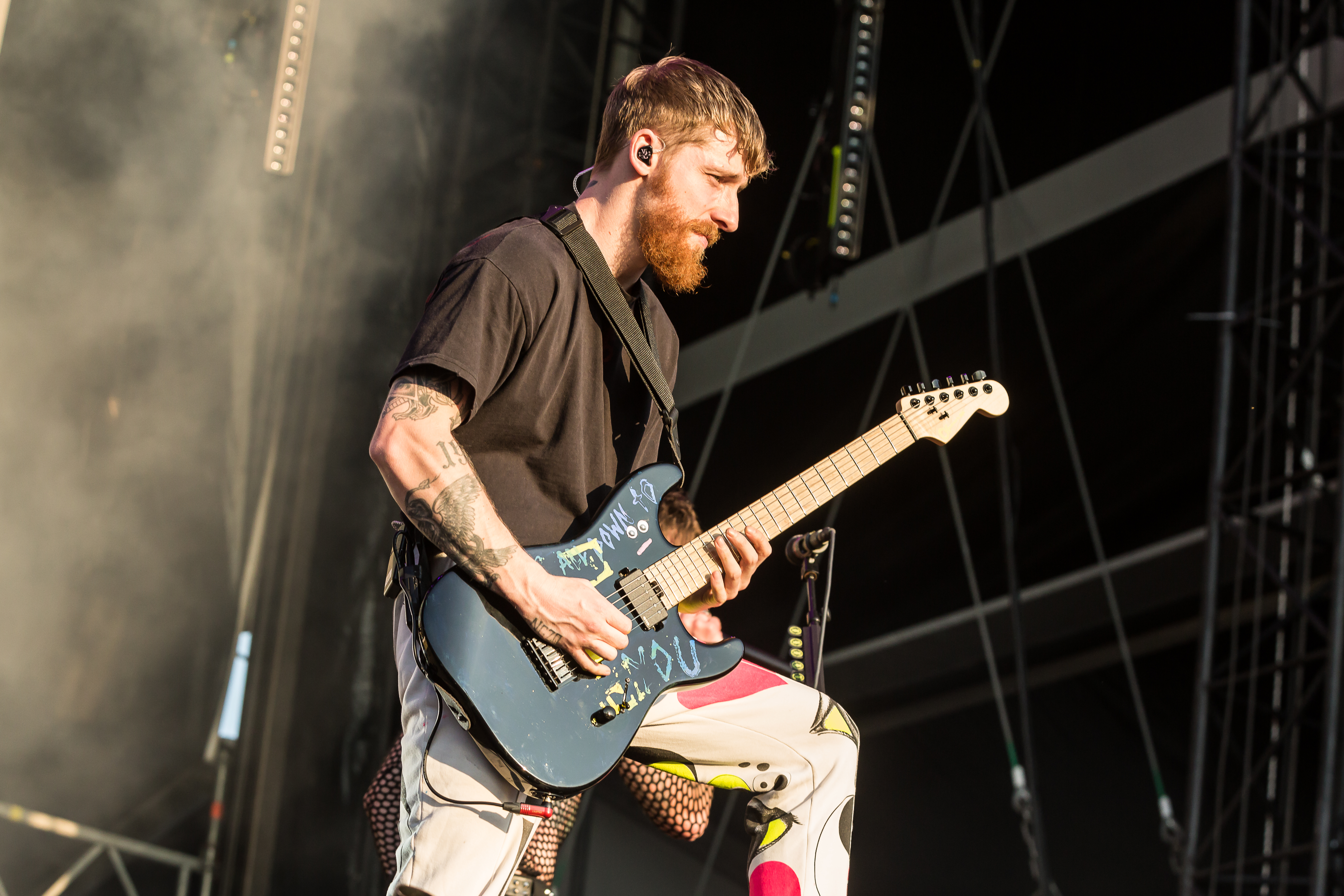
Long at Full Force festival

The band released its second album, Brainwashed, in March 2015, and third in April 2017, You Are We. You Are We involved a pledge and a crowdfund campaign for production of the album, which allowed the band to evolve their sound and grow, leading to an independent label named Sleeps Brothers.

In 2019, the So What? album was released, preceded by a social media promotion which featured a cryptic photo post of an individual in a hazmat suit holding a USB drive. Long detailed his favorite guitar parts on that album in a 2019 interview with Guitar.com. Sleeps Society released in June 2021 with a deluxe version of the album following after.

The guitar brand Charvel released a Sean Long signature guitar model in 2022. The design choices made on the guitar included a high-gloss black finish, simple electronics, a hardtail bridge, locking tuners, and a neon yellow bridge pickup with a matching neon logo on the headstock. It was described as having "futuristic simplicity" in a Guitar.com feature.

In 2023, a clip of Long performing an experimental pitch-shifting approach to playing guitar using dual effects pedals went viral.

The band's sixth studio album Self Hell was released March 2024. Long's guitar work appeared on a 2024 EP featuring heavy metal covers versions of soundtrack of the video game Cult of the Lamb, alongside other popular metal musicians.

== Equipment ==
=== Guitars ===
- Charvel Signature Model

=== Amplifiers ===
- Peavey 6505 or 6534+
- Marshall JVM
- Mesa-Boogie Dual Rectifier

=== Effects ===
- DigiTech Whammy
- MXR Slash model octave fuzz
