= Amos =

Amos or AMOS may refer to:

== People and religious figures ==
- Amos (name), a given name, nickname and surname
- Amos (prophet), a Jewish prophet from the 8th century BCE, and the author of the Book of Amos

== Arts and entertainment ==
- Amos (album), an album by Michael Ray
- Amos (band), an American Christian rock band
- Amos (film), a 1985 American made-for-television drama film
- Amos (guitar), a 1958 Gibson Flying V
- Amos Records, an independent record label established in Los Angeles, California, in 1968

== Technology ==
- AMOS, or Advanced Mortar System, a 120 mm automatic twin-barreled, breech-loaded mortar turret
- AMOS (programming language), a dialect of BASIC on the Amiga computer
- Alpha Micro Operating System, a proprietary operating system used in Alpha Microsystems minicomputers
- IBM SPSS Amos, a statistical software package by IBM used in structural equation modeling, companion software in the SPSS family
- Air Force Maui Optical and Supercomputing observatory, an Air Force Research Laboratory operating on Maui, Hawaii
- Amos (satellite), series of Israeli IAI-built civilian communications satellites
  - AMOS (satellite bus), a satellite bus that is the foundation of all but one of the Amos satellites

== Food ==
- Famous Amos, a cookie company founded by Wally Amos
- Amos Food, a confectionery company founded by Amos Ma

== Places ==
=== United States ===
- Amos, Kentucky, an unincorporated community
- Amos, Missouri, an unincorporated community
- Amos, Nevada, an unincorporated community
- Amos Lake (Minnesota)
- Amos Lake (Connecticut), New London County, Connecticut

=== Elsewhere ===
- Amos, Quebec, Canada, a town
- Amos (ancient city), an ancient town close to Marmaris, Turkey
- Amos Lake (Antarctica), a lake on Signy Island

== Other uses ==
- Book of Amos, a book in the Bible
- Amos, the NATO reporting name of the R-33 air-to-air missile
- Australian Meteorological and Oceanographic Society
- Ancient Mystic Order of Samaritans, a fraternal appendant body to the Odd Fellows
