= Eckington School =

Location
- Dronfield Road; Eckington, Derbyshire, S21 4GN; England; 53°18′28″N 1°22′41″W

Information
- Type: Academy
- Established: 1978
- Trust: Chorus Education Trust
- Department for Education URN: 149825 Tables
- Ofsted: Reports
- Headteacher: Richard Cronin
- Gender: Coeducational
- Age: 11 to 18
- Enrolment: 1,273 as of March 2023
- Houses: Artemis, Athena, Zeus, Poseidon, and Apollo
- Colours: Red, Blue and Gold
- Website: https://www.eckington.chorustrust.org/

Eckington School is a coeducational secondary school and sixth form located in Eckington, Derbyshire in England, next to the B6056 road. It has around 1,250 pupils. The school is an academy, and is part of the Chorus Education Trust.

== History ==
Previous to the opening of the school, there was the Eckington County Secondary School, which opened in Halfway (in Derbyshire before 1967) in 1930, and became the Eckington Grammar School in 1945. In Eckington was also the Eckington Secondary Modern School on School Street; when the grammar school became Derbyshire's first comprehensive school - the Westfield School - in 1957, this became Eckington Junior School. The current site started construction in 1978 and opened to students a few years later in 1983.

== Admissions ==
The school catchment area includes surrounding areas such as Killamarsh, Renishaw, Beighton, Ridgeway and Mosborough. Despite the school being closer to several Sheffield residential areas (including Beighton and Mosborough) than other Derbyshire ones, the admissions policy is set in such a way to favour pupils coming from the Derbyshire feeder schools in areas such as Killamarsh, Ridgeway and Renishaw. This is because most students from the Mosborough and Beighton area attend Westfield School.

== Academic performance ==
Eckington Comprehensive was designated a specialist engineering college. This title was removed from the school.

In June 2022, the school was given an "Inadequate" rating by Ofsted.

== Notable former pupils ==
- Chris Pritchard 1999, Represented Scotland at 2010 Commonwealth Games Track Cycling
- Millie Bright, footballer
- Ruth Amos, entrepreneur and inventor
- Adam Duffy, professional snooker player
- Members of While She Sleeps Mat Welsh, Sean Long, Aaran McKenzie and Adam Savage. Their music video for "Our Legacy" was filmed at the school.
