= Amosov =

Amosov (Russian: Амосов) is a Russian masculine surname, derived from the given name Amos. Its feminine counterpart is Amosova. It may refer to

- Alexey Amosov (born 1981), Russian sledge hockey player
- Nikolai Amosov (1913–2002), Ukrainian heart surgeon
- Serafima Amosova (1914–1993), Deputy Regimental Commander of the 46th Guards Night Bomber Aviation Regiment
- Zinaida Amosova (born 1950), Soviet cross-country skier
- Yaroslav Amosov (born 1993), Ukrainian MMA fighter

== See also ==
- 2948 Amosov, an asteroid named after Nikolai Amosov
