= Fakers Plague =

Single by While She Sleeps

from the album Sleeps Society
- Released: 6 December 2019
- Genre: Metalcore
- Length: 5:54
- Label: Sleeps Brothers; Search and Destroy; Spinefarm; UNFD; Universal Music
- Songwriter(s): While She Sleeps
- Producer(s): Carl Bown

While She Sleeps singles chronology
"Elephant" (2019)	"Fakers Plague" (2019)	"Sleeps Society" (2020)

"Fakers Plague" (stylised in all caps) is a song by British metalcore band While She Sleeps. Produced by Carl Bown, the track was released as a standalone single on 6 December 2019, nine months after the release of the band's fourth studio album, So What?. The song is later included in the deluxe edition of the band's fifth studio album Sleeps Society, released on 3 June 2022. As lead guitarist Sean Long explained, the band had a lot of anger building up within them, and they thought it was amazing to come together and express the song through music.

== Music video ==
Their music video for "Fakers Plague" was released on the same day as the single was streamed. The band released it along with a special phone-sized prism that let the viewers watch the video as a hologram projected from viewers' device.

== Personnel ==
While She Sleeps

- Lawrence "Loz" Taylor – lead vocals
- Sean Long – lead guitar, backing vocals
- Mat Welsh – rhythm guitar, vocals, piano
- Aaran McKenzie – bass, backing vocals
- Adam "Sav" Savage – drums, percussion
