= The North Stands for Nothing =

EP by While She Sleeps
- Released: 26 July 2010
- Recorded: 4 January – 28 April 2010
- Studio: The Barn, Sheffield, South Yorkshire, England; Turan Audio, Oxford
- Genre: Metalcore
- Length: 23:52; 27:16 (Deluxe Edition)
- Label: Small Town; Doom Patrol; Good Fight Music; Shock
- Producer: Mat Welsh

While She Sleeps chronology
Split (2009)	The North Stands for Nothing (2010)	This Is the Six (2012)

Singles from The North Stands for Nothing (deluxe edition)
- 1. "Be(lie)ve" Released: 14 March 2011

The North Stands for Nothing is the third EP by English metalcore band While She Sleeps. The band recorded the album in a home studio between January and April 2010. It was released by Small Town Records on 26 July 2010, before later being released as a deluxe edition by Good Fight Music, featuring the single "Be(lie)ve" as a bonus track. The EP was produced by Mat Welsh, the band's rhythm guitarist. It received generally favourable reviews, with Big Cheese reviewer Lais Martins Waring championing the band as "very promising". Coupled with their extensive touring following its release, the album contributed to a significant increase in the band's popularity.

== Background and promotion ==
The North Stands for Nothing was recorded and produced at The Barn in Sheffield, England, between 4 January – 28 April 2010. The Barn is a converted barn owned by guitarist Mat Welsh's father. The space is not a recording studio and is simply described by members of the band as a place where they hang-out, party and practice. The album was self-produced and mixed by Welsh and then mastered by Tim Turan in Oxford, England. Speaking retrospectively about the recording process, Welsh said that the album took a long time to record. Admitting that it was due to them partying, jovially suggesting that "it wouldn't have took so long if Strongbow wasn't included." The North Stands for Nothing was released on 26 June 2010, through Small Town Records. Two days prior to its release, While She Sleeps held an album launch show at The Plug in their hometown. In conjunction with the production company Get Deluxe, the band produced two music videos to promote tracks from the CD. The video for "Crows" features the band performing near the ruins of a nondescript building. While the video for "Hearts Aside Our Horses" features live footage from the album launch show.

Later in the year, the band signed a deal with Good Fight Music to release the mini-album in the United States – initially releasing it on 23 November 2010, as digital download only. The following month, the band signed a deal with Doom Patrol to release The North Stands for Nothing in Japan on 22 December 2010. In February 2011, the album was given away in its entirety as a free CD in an issue of Metal Hammer magazine. When questioned about the decision vocalist Lawrence Taylor said "hopefully it will generate more of a fanbase," while drummer Adam Savage added "we did [the album] ourselves so we haven't got any debts so we were just like 'let's give it out'." In January 2011, the band recorded a new single at The Barn – subsequently releasing "Be(lie)ve" through Good Fight Music on 15 March 2011. The single was originally not part of the album but was added as a bonus track and released as a deluxe edition CD in the United States on 26 July 2011. Later in the year, While She Sleeps signed a deal with Shock Records to release their material in Australia – seeing the release of the deluxe edition of the album on 9 December 2011. On 20 February 2012, Small Town Records released a limited edition 10" vinyl version of the original album – limited to 250 copies in white and 250 copies in clear.

== Composition ==
=== Influences, style and themes ===
While She Sleeps are generally recognized by professional reviewers as a metallic hardcore band and are known for their high energy and edgy sound. The recording features technical guitar picking, big riffs, heavy bass lines, crashing drums and screaming vocals. When questioned about their sound, Welsh described the band as having a "raw UK vibe", adding that they like to keep their music simple and have "more a party vibe". Vocalist Taylor added that their sound is "less pure solo and just more energy." Dom Wyatt of Dead Press! suggested that the band stick to the mould of a metalcore band with the adage "don't fix what isn't broken." In an interview in 2011, vocalist Taylor stated that the title – The North Stands for Nothing – has two meanings and that it is open to interpretation. Explaining that being from the North of England; the people that the band know "won't take crap" while also stating that the title means that it doesn't matter where you're from (geographically) you can still "get involved" with the band's music. Guitarist Welsh added that the title reflects the UK underground scene and how people will go to see a local band who are their friends and leave before seeing other bands – saying that "that's not the way it should be." In an interview in 2011, Welsh explained that the lyrics on "My Conscience, Your Freedom" are about the government – specifically noting on the line "our coins can pay for the crime." When questioned about the single "Be(lie)ve", Welsh said that it was about the government and religion. Taylor explained further; "we wrote about how people follow shit and don't really think about what they're following".

== Critical reception ==
Professional ratings
Review scores
Source	Rating
Big Cheese	4/5 stars
Bring the Noise	8/10 stars
Dead Press!	8/10 stars
Kerrang!	3/5 stars
Lords of Metal	78/100
Metal Hammer	8/10 stars
The New Review	3.5/5 stars

Critical reception to The North Stands for Nothing was generally positive. Several reviewers noted on the balance that While She Sleeps have between melody and the heavier elements of their sound. Metal Hammer reviewer Terry Bezer, specifically complimented the track "Hearts Aside Our Horses" – enthusing that it is "a lesson in how to be both progressive and hook laden at once." Adam Kennedy of Kerrang! complimented the band for putting "their own spin" on metalcore. Saying that they test and respect the genre's conventions in equal measure – specifically noting their use of a piano interlude on "Trophies" while suggesting that "tearing heads off is their forte". In his review for Big Cheese, Lais Martin Wairing enthused that the band are "very promising," comparing them to Bring Me the Horizon but offering that While She Sleeps "deserve success in their own right." The album also received some minor criticism, with several reviewers picking up on the short overall length of the CD and While She Sleeps' similarities to other bands. In a generally favorable review for The New Review, Jen Rochester said that the CD "is over before you know it," while concluding that "it's definitely an effort worth checking out." Similarly, Dom Wyatt of Dead Press! said that The North Stands for Nothing is very similar to Hollow Crown by Architects but that it is a "cracking debut" that While She Sleeps should be proud of.

== Track listing ==
All songs written and composed by While She Sleeps.

No.	Title	Length
1.	"The North Stands for Nothing"	4:22
2.	"Trophies"	0:39
3.	"Crows"	3:18
4.	"My Conscience, Your Freedom"	3:35
5.	"Lost Above the Arches"	1:21
6.	"Proud of the Demon in Me"	4:00
7.	"The Truth"	2:27
8.	"Hearts Aside Our Horses"	4:05
Total length:		23:52

Deluxe edition bonus track
No.	Title	Length
9.	"Be(lie)ve"	3:24
Total length:		27:16

== Personnel ==
While She Sleeps

- Lawrence "Loz" Taylor – lead vocals
- Mat Welsh – rhythm guitar, vocals, piano, production, mixing
- Sean Long – lead guitar, backing vocals
- Aaran McKenzie – bass, backing vocals
- Adam "Sav" Savage – drums, percussion

Additional personnel

- Tim Turan – mastering
- While She Sleeps – artwork

== Release history ==
Region	Date	Label	Edition	Format	Ref
United Kingdom	26 July 2010	Small Town Records	Original	Compact disc	
United States	23 November 2010	Good Fight Music	Original	Digital download	
Japan	22 December 2010	Doom Patrol	Original	Compact disc	
United States	26 July 2011	Good Fight Music	Deluxe	Compact disc	
Australia	9 December 2011	Shock	Deluxe	Compact disc	
United Kingdom	20 February 2012	Small Town Records	Original	Vinyl	
