= Sleeps Society =

Studio album by While She Sleeps
- Released: 16 April 2021
- Recorded: January–October 2020
- Studios: Six Audio, Sheffield, South Yorkshire, England; Yellow Arch Studios, Sheffield, South Yorkshire; Treehouse Studios, Chesterfield, Derbyshire
- Genre: Metalcore
- Length: 44:28
- Labels: Sleeps Brothers; Search and Destroy; Spinefarm; Universal Music
- Producers: Sean Long; Carl Bown

While She Sleeps chronology
So What? (2019)	Sleeps Society (2021)	Self Hell (2024)

Singles from Sleeps Society
- 1. "Sleeps Society" Released: 15 October 2020; 2. "You Are All You Need" Released: 7 February 2021; 3. "Nervous" Released: 18 March 2021; 4. "Eye to Eye" Released: 14 April 2022; 5. "Fakers Plague" Released: 6 December 2019

Deluxe edition cover
- Artwork used for the deluxe edition cover.

Sleeps Society (stylised in all caps) is the fifth studio album by English metalcore band While She Sleeps. It was released on 16 April 2021, through the band's independent label Sleeps Brothers, in collaboration with Search and Destroy, Spinefarm Records, and Universal Music. The album was produced by Carl Bown and Sean Long, the band's lead guitarist.

== Background and promotion ==
On 15 October 2020, the band released the first single and title track "Sleeps Society" along with an accompanying music video. That same day, the band announced the album itself, the album cover and release date. They also unveiled their new members subscription service called Sleeps Society via the Patreon platform. Through the service, fans will be able to contribute and subscribe with monthly donations to the band, and in turn contributors will have access to exclusive perks such as merchandise, secret shows, early access to tickets, podcasts, play throughs, tips, and more.

On 7 February 2021, the band released the second single "You Are All You Need", which debuted on Daniel P. Carter's BBC Radio 1's Rock Show. At the same time, the band revealed the official track list of the album. Guitarist Sean Long commented about the track: "We somehow managed to inject enough personal inspiration from each member for it to completely embody 'the Sleeps sound' with ease." On 18 March, one month before the album release, the band released the third single "Nervous" featuring Simon Neil of Biffy Clyro and its corresponding music video. On 14 April 2022, the band released the fourth single "Eye to Eye" while also announcing the deluxe edition of the album which is set to be released on 3 June. At the same time, the band officially revealed the album cover and the track list.

== Critical reception ==
Professional ratings
Review scores
Source	Rating
Dead Press!	8/10 stars
Distorted Sound	9/10
The Guardian	4/5 stars
Kerrang!	4/5 stars
Louder Sound	4/5 stars
Rock Sins	8/10
Wall of Sound	9.5/10

Sleeps Society received generally positive reviews from critics. Damon Taylor from Dead Press! rated the album positively calling it: "It's a fitting conclusion to a record that, admittedly, could not have been created without the unfathomable and relentless support of the fanbase – nay, community that they have nurtured. Broad in scope yet refusing to fall victim to quality control, Sleeps Society is not only a benchmark offering from While She Sleeps, but also one that puts them closer to the forefront of British metalcore." Distorted Sound scored the album 9 out of 10 and said: "WHILE SHE SLEEPS are a band that has the power to use their own awe-inspiring bond to unify the masses. Sleeps Society feels like a welcoming euphoric warm hug. They've built upon the foundations formed from So What? and perfected the formula both sonically and lyrically. It's a magnificent achievement and should be a landmark album for the band. If you want to feel like you're not alone, welcome to the Sleeps Society." Ben Beaumont-Thomas at The Guardian was positive towards the release stating, "Social distancing may soon end, but it's a term that seems to define a UK wracked with problems of loneliness, inequality and division. And with the right to protest also under threat, While She Sleeps' rallying cries for unity and resistance have real potency, and are another example of how the UK's best pop music right now is often its loudest." Paul Travers of Kerrang! considered the release to be "...the familiar riff-fuelled energy and anthemic gang-chant hooks, but season their sonic stew with a few new ingredients."

Writing for Louder Sound, Dannii Leivers calls the album "...a message of self-love: of knowing your worth at a moment when mental health is on its arse and people are full of doubt and fear for the future. All of which makes Sleeps Society an album very much for these troubled times, from a band we can continue to believe in." Sam Dignon of Rock Sins rated the album 8 out of 10 and said: "Still, Sleeps Society is another fantastic album from While She Sleeps that shows how important independence and creative freedom can be for a band. Even if not everything works, it's an album they have poured everything into and every member feels at the top of their game." Wall of Sound gave the album almost a perfect score 9.5/10 and saying: "Sleeps Society manages to be so many things in 11 songs — it's inspiring, furious, dark and emotional to name a few. At the same time, it feels like it's just for you, that the band wrote the album for you and only you. This band is huge, this is their fifth album and it has such a polished sound. But it's still as intimate and personal as a much smaller — earlier into their career- band would release. I can't remember the last time an album felt so personal to me, maybe something from a band I have been a massive fan of for a long time, but to feel an album so personally as a new listener of the band is incredible. I could have done with this album last year while struggling with my mental health, but I have it now, and I know it will help me next time I feel like shit."

It was elected by Loudwire as the 40th best rock/metal album of 2021.

== Track listing ==
All lyrics are written by While She Sleeps; all music is composed by While She Sleeps.

Sleeps Society track listing
No.	Title	Length
1.	"Enlightenment(?)"	5:02
2.	"You Are All You Need"	3:28
3.	"Systematic"	2:56
4.	"Nervous" (featuring Simon Neil of Biffy Clyro)	4:06
5.	"Pyai"	1:54
6.	"Know Your Worth (Somebody)"	4:37
7.	"No Defeat for the Brave" (featuring Deryck Whibley of Sum 41)	4:12
8.	"Division Street"	3:34
9.	"Sleeps Society"	3:19
10.	"Call of the Void" (featuring Sleeps Society)	4:11
11.	"The End"	7:03
Total length:		44:28

Deluxe edition
No.	Title	Length
1.	"Enlightenment(?)"	5:02
2.	"You Are All You Need"	3:28
3.	"Systematic" (new version; featuring Rou Reynolds of Enter Shikari)	3:31
4.	"Eye to Eye"	3:53
5.	"Nervous" (featuring Simon Neil of Biffy Clyro)	4:06
6.	"Pyai"	1:54
7.	"Know Your Worth (Somebody)"	4:37
8.	"No Defeat for the Brave" (featuring Deryck Whibley of Sum 41)	4:12
9.	"The Enemy Is the Inner Me"	3:09
10.	"Division Street"	3:34
11.	"Sleeps Society"	3:19
12.	"Fakers Plague"	5:53
13.	"The Long Way Home"	4:46
14.	"You Are All You Need" (acoustic version)	4:40
15.	"Call of the Void" (featuring Sleeps Society)	4:11
16.	"The End"	7:03
Total length:		67:18

Notes

- All track titles are stylised in capital letters. "The End" is stylised as "DN3 3HT".

== Personnel ==
Credits adapted from Discogs.

While She Sleeps

- Lawrence "Loz" Taylor – lead vocals
- Sean Long – lead guitar, backing vocals, synthesizers, engineering, production
- Mat Welsh – rhythm guitar, vocals, piano, artwork
- Aaran McKenzie – bass, backing vocals
- Adam "Sav" Savage – drums, percussion, piano, artwork

Additional musicians

- Simon Neil of Biffy Clyro – guest vocals and guitar on track 4, "Nervous"
- Deryck Whibley of Sum 41 – guest vocals on track 7, "No Defeat for the Brave"
- Sleeps Society – guest vocals on track 10, "Call of the Void"

Additional personnel

- Carl Bown – production, mixing
- Jim Pinder – engineering
- Ste Kerry – mastering
- Eurobroid and Ruby Sanderson – artwork
- Greg Moore – lacquer cut
- While She Sleeps, Giles Smith and Nick Porter – photography

== Charts ==
Chart performance for Sleeps Society
Chart (2021)	Peak position
Austrian Albums (Ö3 Austria)	11
Belgian Albums (Ultratop Flanders)	131
German Albums (Offizielle Top 100)	13
Scottish Albums (Official Charts)	44
Swiss Albums (Schweizer Hitparade)	22
UK Albums (Official Charts)	59
UK Rock & Metal Albums (Official Charts)	7
