= You Are We =

Studio album by While She Sleeps
- Released: 21 April 2017
- Recorded: July 2016–January 2017
- Studio: Treehouse Studios, Chesterfield, Derbyshire, England; The Barn, Sheffield, South Yorkshire; St Pancras Old Church, London (Special Edition)
- Genre: Metalcore
- Length: 51:03
- Label: Sleeps Brothers; SharpTone; Arising Empire; UNFD
- Producer: While She Sleeps; Carl Bown

While She Sleeps chronology
Brainwashed (2015)	You Are We (2017)	So What? (2019)

Singles from You Are We
- 1. "Civil Isolation" Released: 4 September 2016; 2. "Hurricane" Released: 20 November 2016; 3. "You Are We" Released: 20 January 2017; 4. "Silence Speaks" Released: 23 February 2017; 5. "Feel" Released: 17 April 2017; 6. "Empire of Silence" Released: 15 May 2017; 7. "Steal the Sun" Released: 21 August 2017

You Are We is the third studio album by English metalcore band While She Sleeps. The band decided to release it through their independent label Sleeps Brothers, and funded the album through PledgeMusic. It was released on 21 April 2017 in collaboration with SharpTone Records, Arising Empire and UNFD. The album was produced by the band themselves and Carl Bown.

== Background and promotion ==
In early 2016, the band mentioned that they had begun writing for their third studio album. On 29 July, they announced that recording for the album had begun in their recently built studio. On 4 September, they revealed the first single, titled "Civil Isolation", and on 12 September launched pre-orders and a PledgeMusic campaign for the album. Also on 12 September they parted ways with their record label. The second single, "Hurricane", was released on 20 November, alongside an announcement of the album title and release date. The same day the band announce their signing to Australian independent label UNFD.

On 20 January 2017, the band released the third single and title track "You Are We". On 23 February, they released a song titled "Silence Speaks" featuring Oliver Sykes, vocalist of Bring Me the Horizon. In April 2017, the group embarked on a month long tour of the United Kingdom and Ireland. On 17 April, four days before the album release, the band released the fifth single "Feel". On 2 May 2018, the band announced the deluxe edition of You Are We set for release on 20 July 2018, featuring unheard material, demos and live tracks from their September 2017 stripped down show at St. Pancras Church.

== Critical reception ==
Professional ratings
Aggregate scores
Source	Rating
Metacritic	84/100
Review scores
Source	Rating
Dead Press!	9/10 stars
Metal Hammer	4/5 stars
NME	4/5 stars
Rock Sound	8/10 stars
The Music	3/5 stars

You Are We received an average score of 84 out of 100 based on 4 reviews, which indicates "universal acclaim" on Metacritic.

== Commercial performance ==
The album debuted on the UK Albums Chart at number 8.

== Track listing ==
No.	Title	Length
1.	"You Are We"	4:47
2.	"Steal the Sun"	4:37
3.	"Feel"	4:39
4.	"Empire of Silence"	4:23
5.	"Wide Awake"	5:04
6.	"Silence Speaks" (featuring Oliver Sykes of Bring Me the Horizon)	4:55
7.	"Settle Down Society"	4:56
8.	"Hurricane"	4:43
9.	"Revolt"	3:57
10.	"Civil Isolation"	4:22
11.	"In Another Now"	4:35
Total length:		51:03

Special Edition
No.	Title	Length
12.	"Feel" (alternate live version)	4:30
13.	"Silence Speaks" (alternative live version)	5:51
14.	"Hurricane" (alternative live version)	5:21
15.	"Civil Isolation" (demo)	4:26
16.	"Feel" (demo)	4:53
17.	"Fear in Change" (instrumental demo)	3:14
18.	"I Am While She Sleeps"	3:28
19.	"Lost Ideas"	8:12
Total length:		1:30:58

== Personnel ==
Credits adapted from Discogs.

While She Sleeps

- Lawrence "Loz" Taylor – lead vocals
- Sean Long – lead guitar, backing vocals
- Mat Welsh – rhythm guitar, vocals, piano, artwork, illustration
- Aaran McKenzie – bass, backing vocals
- Adam "Sav" Savage – drums, percussion, artwork, illustration

Additional musicians

- Oliver Sykes of Bring Me the Horizon – guest vocals on track 6, "Silence Speaks"
- Marcia Richards of The Skints – additional vocals on track 8, "Hurricane"

Additional personnel

- Carl Bown – production, engineering, mixing, mastering
- While She Sleeps – production
- Phil Gornell – engineering
- Jim Pinder – engineering
- Ste Kerry – mastering
- Dan Jenkins – management
- Giles Smith – photography
- David Bichard – photography

== Charts ==
Chart (2017)	Peak position
Australian Albums (ARIA)	26
Austrian Albums (Ö3 Austria)	16
Belgian Albums (Ultratop Flanders)	31
Belgian Albums (Ultratop Wallonia)	111
German Albums (Offizielle Top 100)	15
Scottish Albums (OCC)	14
Swiss Albums (Schweizer Hitparade)	31
UK Albums (OCC)	8
UK Independent Albums (OCC)	3
UK Rock & Metal Albums (OCC)	1
US Top Hard Rock Albums (Billboard)	20
US Heatseekers Albums (Billboard)	5
