= Amos Eiran =

Former president of the University of Haifa

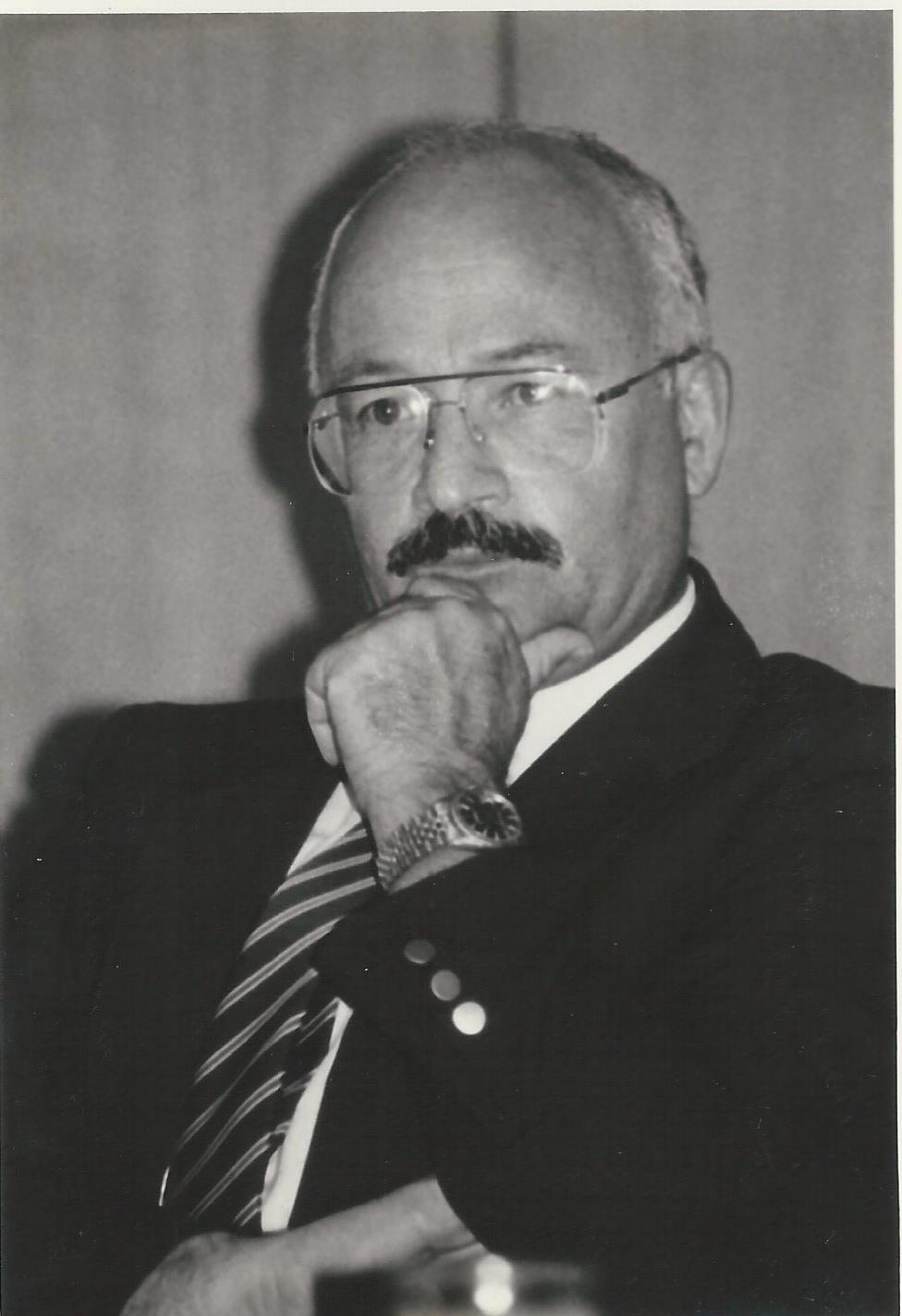
- Born: עמוס ערן
- Known for: President of the University of Haifa (1988-1990 )

Amos Eiran (Hebrew: עמוס ערן) is a former president of the University of Haifa in Israel.

He earned a BA in humanities from American University in Washington, DC, an MA in history from Tel Aviv University, a Diploma in Business Administration from Harvard University, and a Diploma in institutional investments from the Wharton School of the University of Pennsylvania.

== Public service career ==
Eiran was the Director General of the Prime Minister's Office in Israel under Yitzhak Rabin. He also worked as a Counselor at the Israeli Embassy in Washington, DC. Eiran served as the Director General and Chairman of the Board of Mivtahim Pension Funds, Israel's largest pension fund, and a Director on the Boards of Bank Hapoalim and Bank Mizrachi.

From 1988 to 1990 he was President of the University of Haifa in Israel.
