= Danny Amos (footballer, born 1987) =

Israeli professional footballer

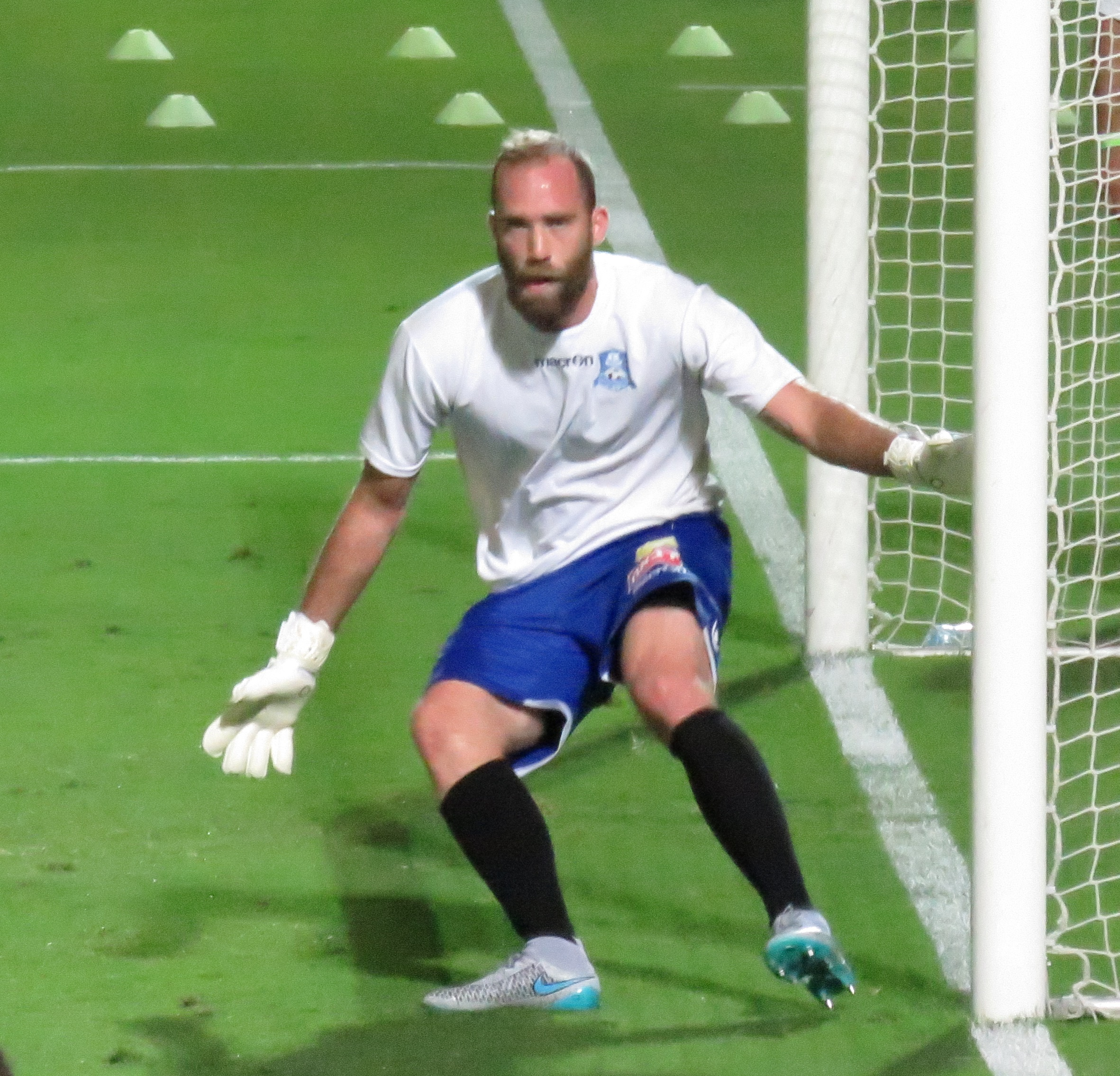
- Amos playing for Hapoel Acre in 2015

Personal information
- Full name: Daniel Amos
- Date of birth: 2 February 1987 (age 39)
- Place of birth: Vanderbijlpark, South Africa
- Height: 1.85 m (6 ft 1 in)
- Position: Goalkeeper

Youth career
- 2001–2006: Ironi Kiryat Shmona

Senior career*
Years	Team	Apps	(Gls)
2006–2013	Ironi Kiryat Shmona	153	(0)
2013–2015	Hapoel Tel Aviv	36	(0)
2015–2016	Hapoel Acre	33	(0)
2016–2017	Maccabi Petah Tikva	34	(0)
2017–2022	Maccabi Netanya	153	(0)
2022–2023	Maccabi Petah Tikva	23	(0)
2023–2024	Sektzia Ness Ziona	16	(0)

International career
2008	Israel U21	1	(0)
- * Club domestic league appearances and goals

Daniel "Danny" Amos (Hebrew: דני עמוס; born 2 February 1987) is an Israeli former professional footballer who played as a goalkeeper.

== Early life ==
He immigrated as a baby to Israel from South Africa, with his English father and his Zimbabwean-born mother. He was raised in kibbutz Kfar Blum.

His older brother Nathan Amos is a notable Israeli rugby union player.

== International career ==
Amos' sole call-up was to the Israel under-21 national team for a friendly against Belarus at Winter Stadium in Ramat Gan on 20 August 2008.

Amos was first called to the senior Israel national team to a friendly versus Ukraine on 22 February 2012. He also remained in several preliminary senior squads during 2012 and 2013, without gaining a full cap.

== Honours ==
=== Club ===
Ironi Kiryat Shmona

- Liga Leumit: 2006/07
- Toto Cup Leumit: 2006/07, 2009
- Israeli Premier League: 2011–12

=== Individual ===
- IFA Footballer of the Year: 2012

== Career statistics ==
As to 1 June 2023

Club performance			League		Cup		League Cup		Continental		Total	
Club	Season	League	Apps	Goals	Apps	Goals	Apps	Goals	Apps	Goals	Apps	Goals
Israel			League		Israel State Cup		Toto Cup		Europe		Total	
Ironi Kiryat Shmona	2006–07	Liga Leumit	5	0	1	0	7	0	0	0	13	0
Ironi Kiryat Shmona	2007–08	Israeli Premier League	8	0	1	0	3	0	0	0	12	0
Ironi Kiryat Shmona	2008–09	Israeli Premier League	33	0	0	0	2	0	3	0	38	0
Ironi Kiryat Shmona	2009–10	Liga Leumit	31	0	1	0	6	0	0	0	38	0
Ironi Kiryat Shmona	2010–11	Israeli Premier League	11	0	2	0	4	0	0	0	17	0
Ironi Kiryat Shmona	2011–12	Israeli Premier League	33	0	2	0	2	0	0	0	37	0
Ironi Kiryat Shmona	2012–13	Israeli Premier League	32	0	3	0	0	0	12	0	47	0
Ironi Kiryat Shmona	Total		153	0	10	0	24	0	15	0	202	0
Hapoel Tel Aviv	2013–14	Israeli Premier League	23	0	1	0	0	0	4	0	28	0
Hapoel Tel Aviv	2014–15	Israeli Premier League	13	0	0	0	4	0	1	0	18	0
Hapoel Tel Aviv	Total		36	0	1	0	4	0	5	0	46	0
Hapoel Acre	2015–16	Israeli Premier League	33	0	1	0	0	0	0	0	34	0
Hapoel Acre	Total		33	0	1	0	0	0	0	0	34	0
Maccabi Petah Tikva	2016–17	Israeli Premier League	34	0	3	0	4	0	0	0	41	0
Maccabi Petah Tikva	Total		34	0	3	0	4	0	0	0	41	0
Maccabi Netanya	2017–18	Israeli Premier League	33	0	0	0	3	0	0	0	36	0
Maccabi Netanya	2018–19	Israeli Premier League	32	0	5	0	4	0	0	0	41	0
Maccabi Netanya	2019–20	Israeli Premier League	30	0	2	0	1	0	0	0	33	0
Maccabi Netanya	2020–21	Israeli Premier League	23	0	1	0	4	0	0	0	28	0
Maccabi Netanya	2021–22	Israeli Premier League	35	0	2	0	4	0	0	0	41	0
Maccabi Netanya	Total		153	0	10	0	16	0	0	0	179	0
Maccabi Petah Tikva	2022–23	Liga Leumit	23	0	4	0	1	0	0	0	28	0
Maccabi Petah Tikva	Total		23	0	4	0	1	0	0	0	28	0
Sektzia Ness Ziona	2023–24	Liga Leumit	16	0	0	0	3	0	0	0	19	0
Sektzia Ness Ziona	Total		16	0	0	0	3	0	0	0	19	0
Career total			432	0	29	0	52	0	20	0	530	0
