= Amos Food =

Chinese confectionery company

Amos Food (Group) Co., Ltd. 阿麦斯食品(集团)股份有限公司
- Trade name: Amos
- Native name: 阿麦斯
- Formerly: Shenzhen Jinduoduo Food Co., Ltd.
- Type: Private
- Industry: Confectionery
- Founded: 2004 (as Shenzhen Jinduoduo Food Co., Ltd.) in Shenzhen, China
- Founder: Amos Ma; Elaine Wu; Steven Ma; Hunter Ye
- Headquarters: No. 32, Taohua Road, Futian Bonded Zone, Shenzhen, Guangdong, China
- Key people: Amos Ma (chairman, president, and CEO); Elaine Wu (vice president and Executive Deputy General Manager); Steven Ma (General Manager of the Production and R&D Center); Hunter Ye (General Manager of the Supply Chain Center)
- Products: Peelerz; 4D
- Brands: Amos Sweets; Biobor
- Revenue: ▲CN¥2.782 billion (US$431.33 million) (2025)
- Net income: ▲CN¥600.021 million (US$93.03 million) (2025)
- Total assets: ▲CN¥2.265 billion (US$351.16 million) (2025)
- Owner: Amos Ma
- Website: https://en.amos-food.com

Amos Food (Group) Co., Ltd. (Chinese: 阿麦斯; pinyin: Āmàisī) is a Chinese sugar confectionery company known for its playful novelty candies founded in 2004. The company focuses on a "Happy and Healthy" product strategy through their creative candy brand Amos Sweets and nutritional candy brand Biobor. It is the largest confectionery company in China and is popular worldwide.

== History ==
Amos was founded by Amos Ma (马恩多) in 1998, specializing in gummy candy. In 2004, he, along with Elaine Wu (伍薇佳), Steven Ma (马红帆), and Hunter Ye (叶海) co-founded the company as Shenzhen Jinduoduo Food Co., Ltd. in Shenzhen, China. The company originally worked in OEM manufacturing and completed its initial accumulation through candy orders from the Middle East and Africa. In 2006, the company's first factory started in Shenzhen. In 2008, the first Amos candy entered Walmart in the United States, entering the North American market.

In 2015, the company established the nutraceutical gummy supplement and candy brand Biobor. In 2018, Biobor launched its first active probiotic gummy and has since become highly popular in China.

In 2024, Amos Ma was inducted into the Candy Hall of Fame, the first non-American to ever be given the honor.

In 2025, Amos experienced significant growth after its products became a viral phenomenon on American social media; its popularity in the North American market eventually surpassed the Chinese market.

On 21 August 2026, the company held the Amos International Candy Festival in Shenzhen. The festival was attended by many leaders from the confectionery and food industries around the world and lasted three days. At the festival, Amos Ma announced the "Amos Treats the World to Sweets" initiative to promote Amos Sweets and support charity and global welfare. He also announced that Amos would partner with the Yao Ming Foundation to debut the "Sweet Ambassadors" Youth Basketball Development Program, to support sports and opportunities for youths in underserved rural communities.
