= Self Hell =

Studio album by While She Sleeps
- Released: 29 March 2024
- Recorded: February–August 2023
- Genre: Metalcore
- Length: 44:55
- Label: Sleeps Brothers; Spinefarm
- Producer: Sean Long; Carl Bown

While She Sleeps chronology
| Sleeps Society (2021) | Self Hell (2024) |

Singles from Self Hell
- 1. "Self Hell" Released: 13 September 2023; 2. "Down" Released: 7 December 2023; 3. "To the Flowers" Released: 15 February 2024; 4. "Leave Me Alone" Released: 21 March 2024; 5. "Rainbows" Released: 15 October 2024

Self Hell is the sixth studio album by English metalcore band While She Sleeps. It was released on 29 March 2024, through the band's independent label Sleeps Brothers, in collaboration with Spinefarm Records. Like their previous album, Sleeps Society (2021), it was produced by Carl Bown and Sean Long, the band's lead guitarist.

== Background and promotion ==
On 13 September 2023, the band released the first single and title track "Self Hell" along with an accompanying music video. That same day, the band announced the album itself and a tentative release date of 15 March. On 7 December, the band unveiled the second single "Down" featuring Alex Taylor of Malevolence.

On 14 February 2024, the band premiered the third single "To the Flowers" and its corresponding music video. On 21 March, one week before the album release, the band released the fourth single "Leave Me Alone".

== Critical reception ==
Professional ratings
Review scores
| Source | Rating |
|---|---|
| Clash | 8/10 |
| Distorted Sound | 9/10 |
| The Guardian | 3/5 stars |
| Kerrang! | 4/5 stars |
| Metal Hammer | 3.5/5 stars |
| Wall of Sound | 8/10 |

Self Hell received generally positive reviews from critics. Clash's Luke Winstanley was positive towards the release stating, "Yet, much like the narrative arc that inspired the record, they've emerged on the other side, still breathing, utilising their pain and each member's very own personal hell to assemble the most confident effort of their career thus far." Distorted Sound scored the album 9 out of 10 and said: "Overall, While She Sleeps have created their magnum-opus. Self Hell is the band at their very best. [...] This is an album that will go on to define While She Sleeps in years to come." Dave Simpson at The Guardian was positive towards the release stating, "Self Hell doesn't always successfully navigate the difficult terrain between pleasing a hardcore following and broadening a sound, but the band certainly aren't standing still."

Rishi Shah of Kerrang! considered the release to be "Staying true to their creative principles, Self Hell marks a band in the form of their lives." Writing for Metal Hammer, Sam Coare calls the album "...a record and statement of our unstable, head-spinning times. It's a levelling up of the Sleeps blueprint, and a work that will undoubtedly see them make similar strides in the live arena, where the album's scope of ambition will surely come further to life." Wall of Sound gave the album a score 8/10 and saying: "Overall, this album is a solid release. If you enjoy metalcore and enjoy While She Sleeps, then you will appreciate what has gone into its construction."

== Track listing ==
All lyrics are written by While She Sleeps; all music is composed by While She Sleeps.

Self Hell track listing
| No. | Title | Length |
|---|---|---|
| 1. | "Peace of Mind" | 1:20 |
| 2. | "Leave Me Alone" | 3:35 |
| 3. | "Rainbows" | 4:22 |
| 4. | "Self Hell" | 4:39 |
| 5. | "Wildfire" | 3:05 |
| 6. | "No Feeling Is Final" (featuring Aether) | 3:13 |
| 7. | "Dopesick" (featuring Fin Power of Stone) | 4:28 |
| 8. | "Down" (featuring Alex Taylor of Malevolence) | 3:54 |
| 9. | "To the Flowers" | 5:03 |
| 10. | "Out of the Blue" | 3:00 |
| 11. | "Enemy Mentality" | 4:13 |
| 12. | "Radical Hatred / Radical Love" | 4:03 |
| Total length: | | 44:55 |

== Personnel ==
While She Sleeps

- Lawrence "Loz" Taylor – lead vocals
- Sean Long – lead guitar, backing vocals, production
- Mat Welsh – rhythm guitar, vocals, piano
- Aaran McKenzie – bass, backing vocals
- Adam "Sav" Savage – drums, percussion

Additional musicians

- Jason "Aether" Taylor – guest instrumentation on track 6, "No Feeling Is Final"
- Fin Power of Stone – guest vocals on track 7, "Dopesick"
- Alex Taylor of Malevolence – guest vocals on track 8, "Down"

Additional personnel

- Carl Bown – production

== Charts ==
Chart performance for Self Hell
| Chart (2024) | Peak position |
|---|---|
| Australian Digital Albums (ARIA) | 22 |
| Austrian Albums (Ö3 Austria) | 40 |
| German Albums (Offizielle Top 100) | 27 |
| Scottish Albums (OCC) | 67 |
| Swiss Albums (Schweizer Hitparade) | 49 |
| UK Albums (OCC) | 51 |
| UK Rock & Metal Albums (OCC) | 2 |
