= Nathan Amos =

Israel international rugby union player (1979)

Nathan Amos נתן עמוס
- Born: Nathan Amos נתן עמוס; 11 August 1979 (age 47) Salisbury Rhodesia
- Height: 6 ft 0 in (1.83 m)
- Weight: 246 lb (112 kg)

Rugby union career
- Position: Prop
Senior career
Years	Team	Apps	(Points)
1997–2002	Upper Galilee RC		
2002–2011	Rainey Old Boys		
2006	Edmonton Irish Canadian	4	(10)
2011–2013	TV Pforzheim		
2013–	ASA Tel Aviv RC		
International career
Years	Team	Apps	(Points)
2000–	Israel	60	
Medal record
Men's rugby union
Representing Israel
Maccabiah Games
Bronze medal – third place	2005 Israel	Team competition

Nathan Amos (Hebrew: נתן עמוס; born August 11, 1979) is an international rugby union player for Israel. Amos is one of the only Israeli rugby players that played his trade abroad and is the most capped player in Israel .

== Playing career ==
=== Northern Ireland ===
Amos played for Rainey Old Boys Rugby Club in Northern Ireland from 2002 to 2011.

=== Germany ===
He moved to play in the Rugby-Bundesliga for TV Pforzheim in the start of the 2011–12 season where Pforzheim finished as runners up.

In January 2013, he returned to Israel to play for ASA Tel Aviv Rugby Club with them he won the Israeli championship in 2015 and 2016.

== International ==
In 2005, Amos scored the winning try for Israel against the United Kingdom at the Maccabiah Games to secure the bronze medal. Amos was a critical part of Israel's promotion from the European Division 3C to 3B in 2009.

== Personal life ==
Nathan's younger brother, Danny, is a professional football player in Israel.
