= Walter Amos =

English footballer

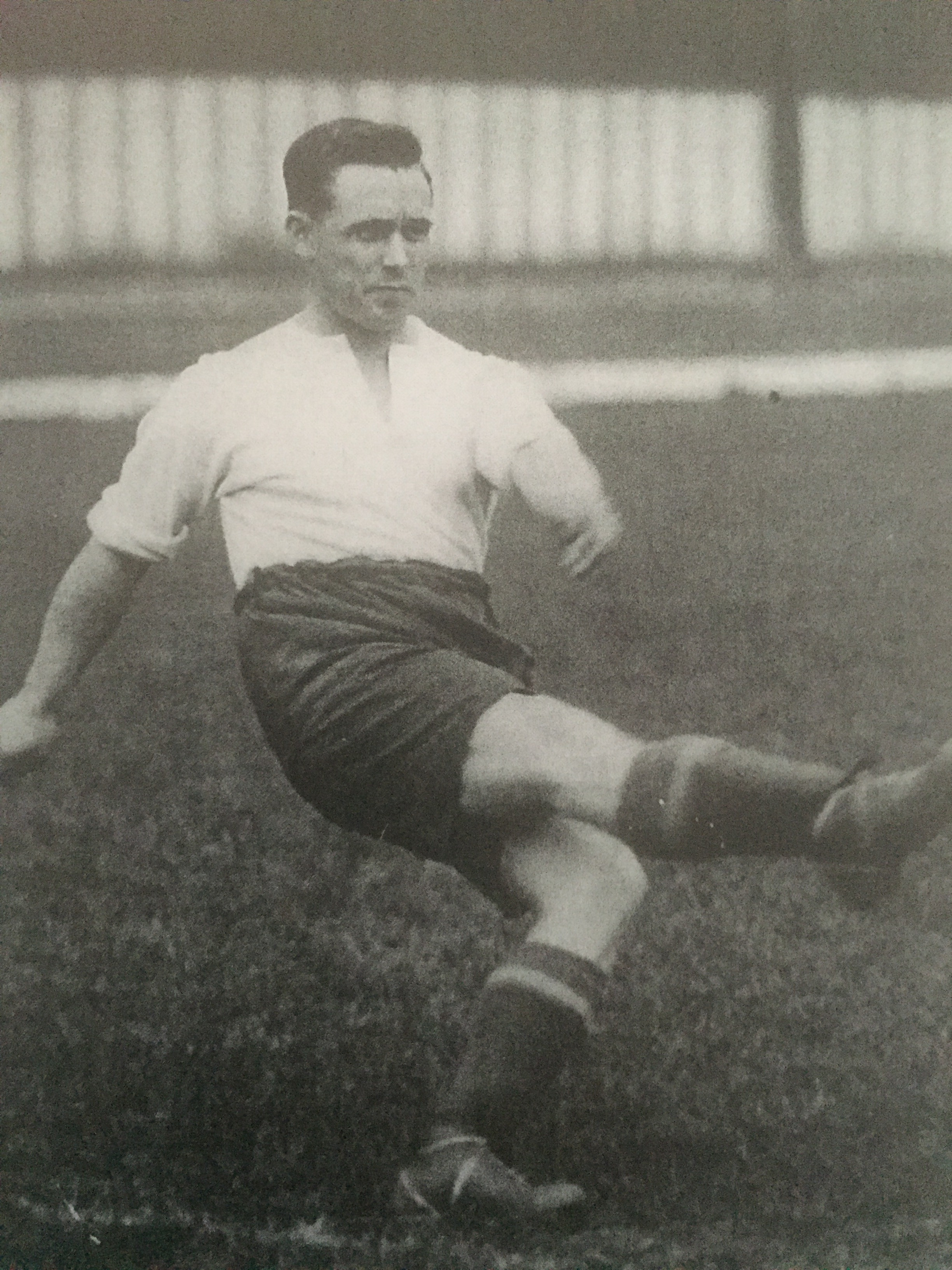

Personal information
- Full name: Walter Robert Amos
- Date of birth: 3 September 1899
- Place of birth: Grimsby, England
- Date of death: 1967 (aged 67–68)
- Place of death: Haslingden, England
- Height: 5 ft 6 in (1.68 m)
- Position: Outside left

Senior career*
Years	Team	Apps	(Gls)
- Worksop Town
1923–1934	Bury	455	(122)
1935	Accrington Stanley	0	(0)
- * Club domestic league appearances and goals

Walter Robert Amos (1899–1967) was a footballer who played in the Football League for Bury. He is Bury's third-highest goalscorer in the Football League with 122.
