= While She Sleeps =

English metalcore band

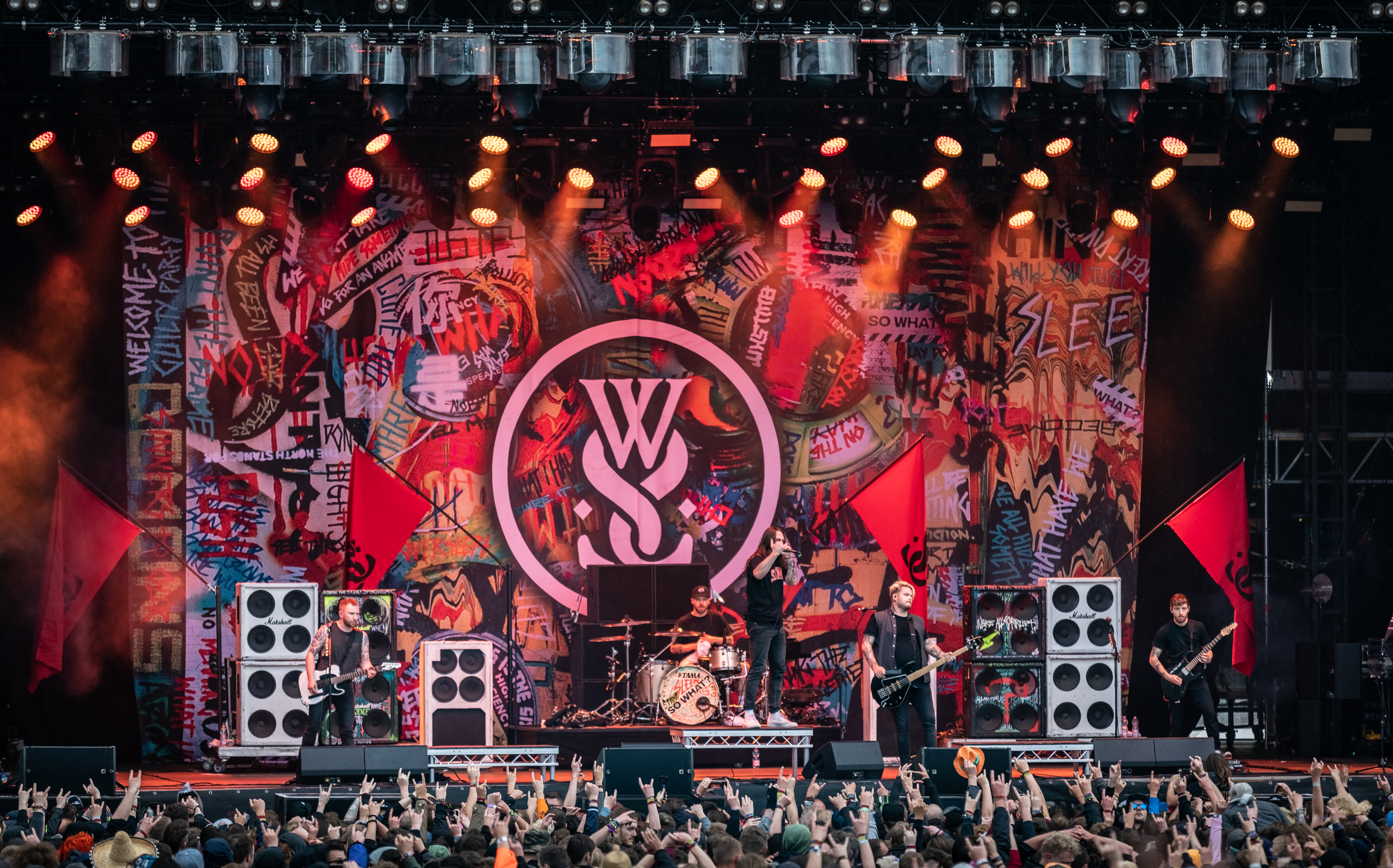
- While She Sleeps performing at Rock am Ring in 2019

Background information
- Origin: Sheffield, South Yorkshire, England
- Genres: Metalcore; melodic hardcore
- Years active: 2006–present
- Labels: Sleeps Brothers; Search and Destroy; Spinefarm; UNFD; Universal Music; Arising Empire; SharpTone; Concord; Razor & Tie; Sony Music; The End; Shock; Good Fight Music; Doom Patrol; Small Town; James
- Members: Sean Long; Aaran McKenzie; Adam "Sav" Savage; Mat Welsh; Lawrence "Loz" Taylor
- Past members: Jordan Widdowson
- Website: whileshesleeps.com

While She Sleeps is an English metalcore band from Sheffield. Formed in 2006, the group consists of vocalist Lawrence Taylor, guitarists Sean Long and Mat Welsh, bassist Aaran McKenzie and drummer Adam Savage. They are currently signed to their own label Sleeps Brothers in the UK and in collaboration with Spinefarm Records in the US and UNFD in Australia. They have released three EPs, And This Is Just the Start, Split and The North Stands for Nothing, and six studio albums, This Is the Six, Brainwashed, You Are We, So What?, Sleeps Society and Self Hell. They received the Best British Newcomer award at the Kerrang! Awards 2012. The group has maintained the same line-up since its formation, with vocalist Taylor joining in 2009 following original vocalist Jordan Widdowson's departure. Despite this, he has still appeared on every release apart from the group's first two EPs.

== History ==
=== Formation, first releases, and The North Stands for Nothing (2006–2011) ===
While She Sleeps was formed in Renishaw, near Sheffield, England, in 2006 by vocalist Jordan Widdowson, drummer Adam Savage, bassist Aaran McKenzie and guitarists Mat Welsh and Sean Long. The group had played together in several bands prior to forming While She Sleeps and are described as being "best mates since school". In 2006, they released their first EP, And This Is Just the Start. This EP, however, was not released on a label. After a handful of live shows, in 2009 the majority of the group decided to focus on the band "full time". In March 2009, the band released a split EP with the band Andwhitestars through James Records limited to 100 copies. After this, vocalist Widdowson decided to leave the band due to work commitments. With the addition of vocalist Lawrence Taylor the band began working on material for their third EP in a home studio. From late 2009 through to 2010 the band toured heavily throughout the UK and eventually in to Europe. With growing public interest, the band finished work on The North Stands for Nothing which was released on 26 July 2010, through Small Town Records. The band held an album launch show on 24 June at The Plug in their hometown and followed its release with extensive touring throughout 2010, including an appearance at Sonisphere Festival. In October, they signed a deal with Good Fight Music to distribute their music in the United States.

Following the release of their mini-album – backed by their extensive touring – the band's popularity continued to increase and interest from media and labels grew. On 15 February 2011, the band recorded a live in session performance at Maida Vale Studios for BBC Radio 1. They also began to work on new material between touring, releasing the non-album single "Be(lie)ve" through Good Fight Music on 15 March 2011. On 4 May, While She Sleeps were invited to open for Bring Me the Horizon in Sheffield at the O2 Academy. In the summer, they performed at several festivals throughout Europe and supported Bring Me the Horizon for two shows in Ireland at the end of August. While She Sleeps were invited to tour the US with Bring Me the Horizon in August through to October. However, While She Sleeps had to cancel their dates in the US, citing problems with immigration. In October, the band went on their first headline tour through the UK and Europe, with support from Bury Tomorrow and Feed the Rhino.

=== This Is the Six (2012–2014) ===
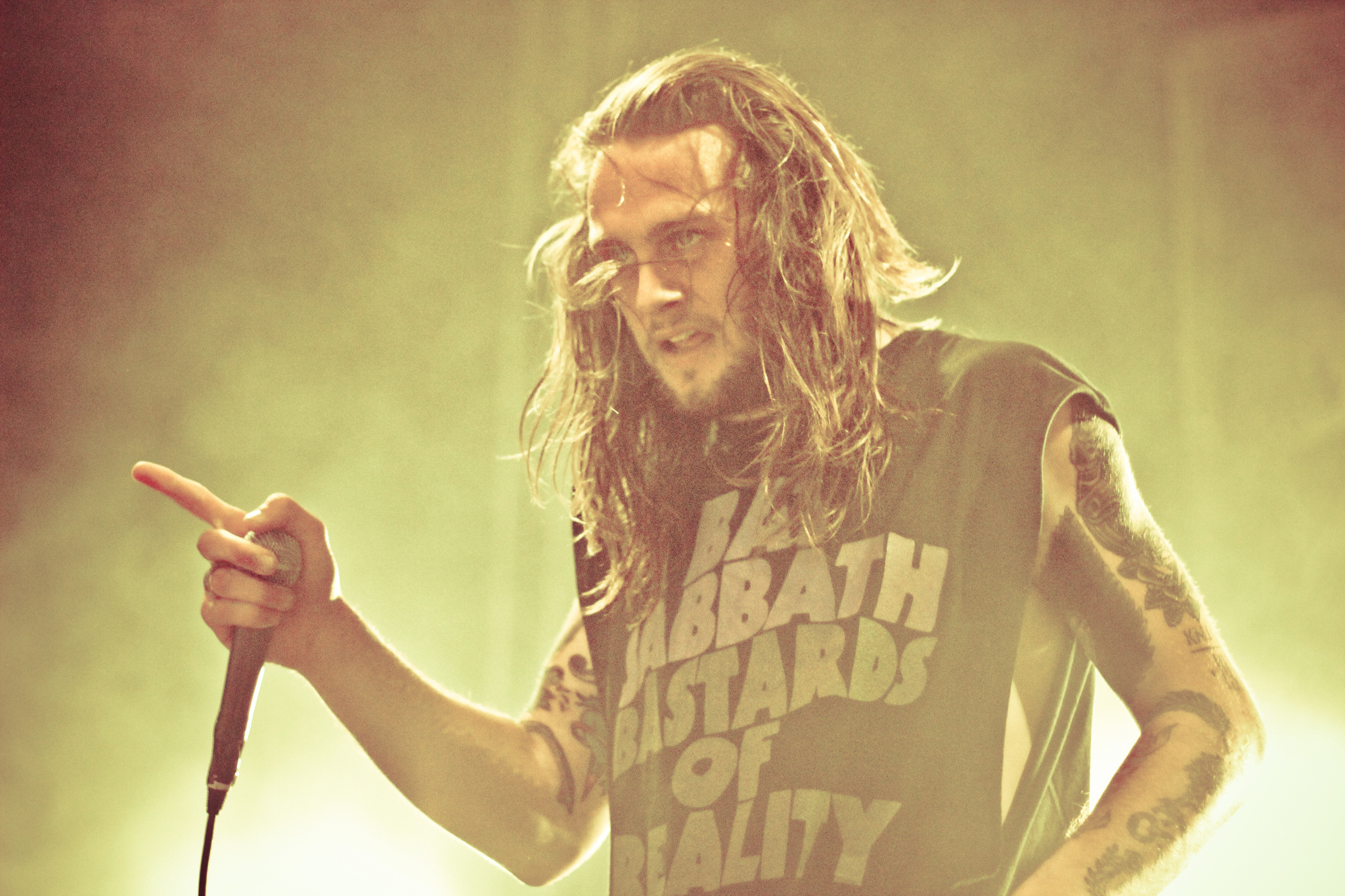
Lawrence Taylor performing with While She Sleeps at Slam Dunk Festival 2012

On 1 November 2011, While She Sleeps began working on their debut album with producer Carl Bown. First working in Chapel Studios in Lincolnshire, England, to record drums before moving to Treehouse Studios in Chesterfield, England, to record the rest of the album. After recording had finished, the band toured the UK in February 2012 as part of the Kerrang! Tour alongside New Found Glory, The Blackout, and Letlive. It was announced on 27 March, that While She Sleeps had signed with Search and Destroy Records to release their début album. On 4 April, Kerrang! magazine revealed that the upcoming album This Is the Six will be released on 6 August 2012 however the release date was later changed to 13 August. The title track "This Is the Six" was released as the first single from the album on 13 May. While She Sleeps are scheduled to appear at festivals and shows throughout the UK and Europe in the summer, including their first appearance at Download Festival. Followed by their first tour of Australia as direct support for House vs Hurricane, in late July and early August. On 7 June 2012, While She Sleeps won an award for Best British Newcomer at the Kerrang! Awards 2012.

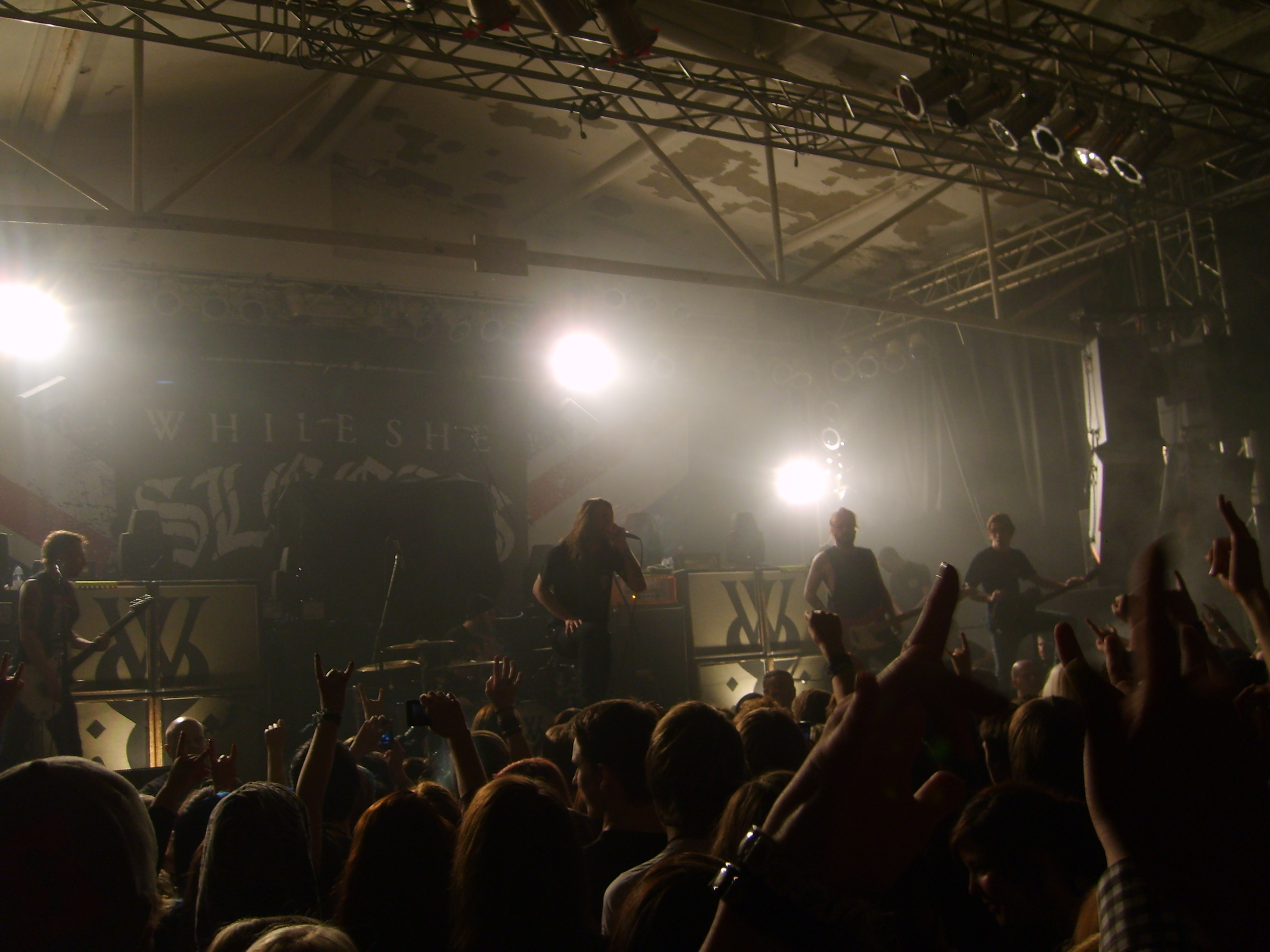
The band performing in Cologne in 2013

Following the success of their debut album, This Is the Six, released 13 August 2012, While She Sleeps embarked on a full 9 date headline UK tour during September with support from Polar, Crossfaith and Bleed from Within. The band then embarked on a European Tour in the Fall, supporting Architects alongside Heights. While She Sleeps then joined Motionless in White and Betraying the Martyrs to support Asking Alexandria in their UK and European Tour. The band also played the Soundwave Festival across Australia during 2013. The band supported Parkway Drive across America and Canada during spring 2013. The band, following this, embarked on a short headline run of the UK when returning from the Parkway Drive tour. While She Sleeps were also confirmed on 4 January 2013 to be playing the entire length of Vans Warped Tour in America and Canada.

=== Taylor's throat surgery and Brainwashed (2014–2016) ===
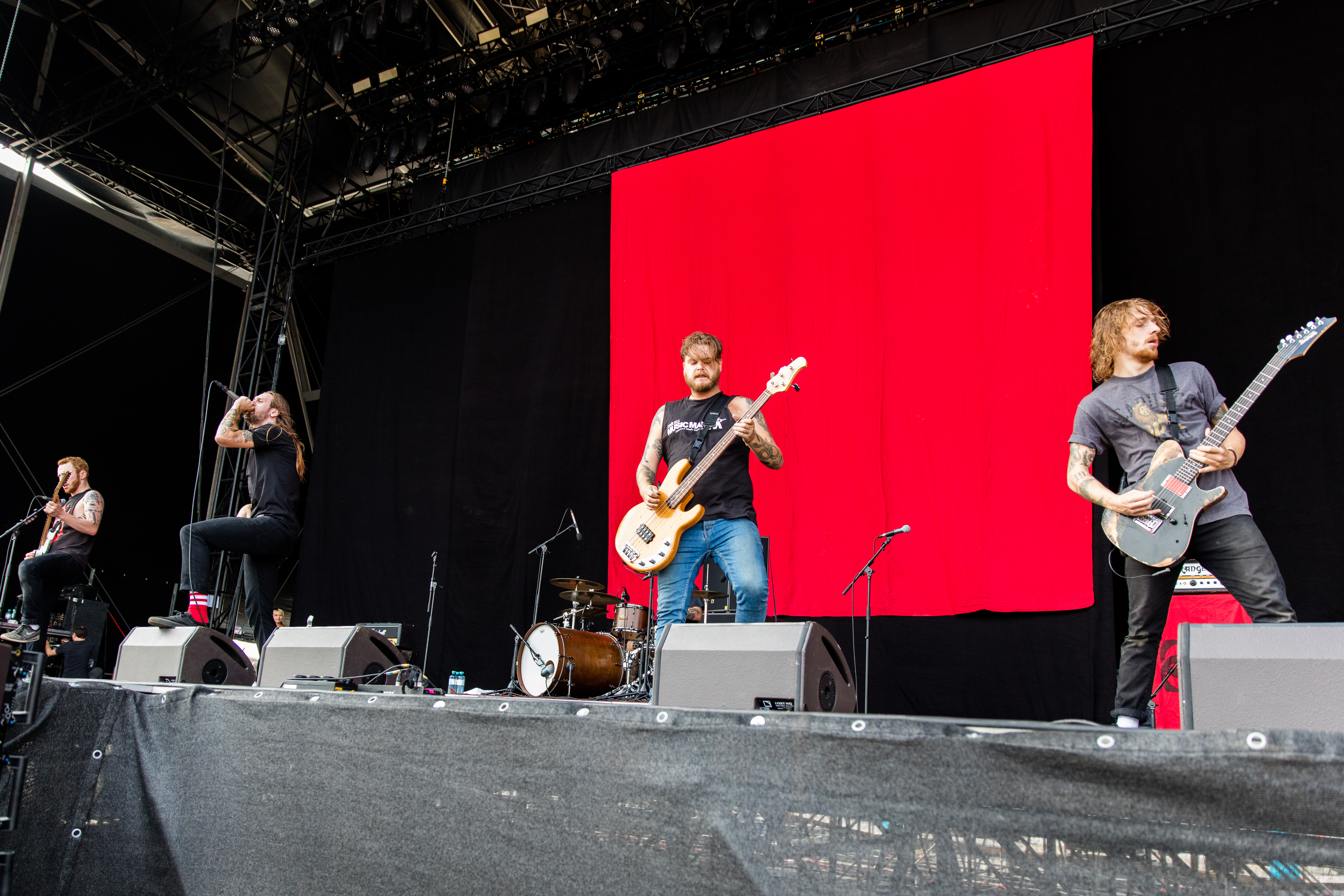
While She Sleeps at Rock'n'Heim 2015

During Warped Tour, they confirmed they had started to write their second full-length studio album. The latter part of 2013 saw vocalist Taylor suffer from vocal problems, leading to the band cancelling shows into 2014 for him to undergo throat surgery and recovery.

While She Sleeps announced a release for their second full-length studio album, Brainwashed on 23 March 2015. To support the album, the band embarked on a co-headline tour with Cancer Bats in April 2015, while also playing 2015's Warped Tour.

=== You Are We (2016–2018) ===
In early 2016, the band mentioned that they had begun writing for their third studio album. On 29 July, they announced that recording for the album had begun in their recently built studio.

On 4 September, they revealed the first single, titled "Civil Isolation", and on 12 September launched pre-orders and a PledgeMusic campaign for the album. Also on 12 September they parted ways with their record label. The second single, "Hurricane", was released on 20 November, alongside an announcement that the album will be titled You Are We and released on 21 April 2017. The same day the band announce their signing to Australian independent label UNFD.

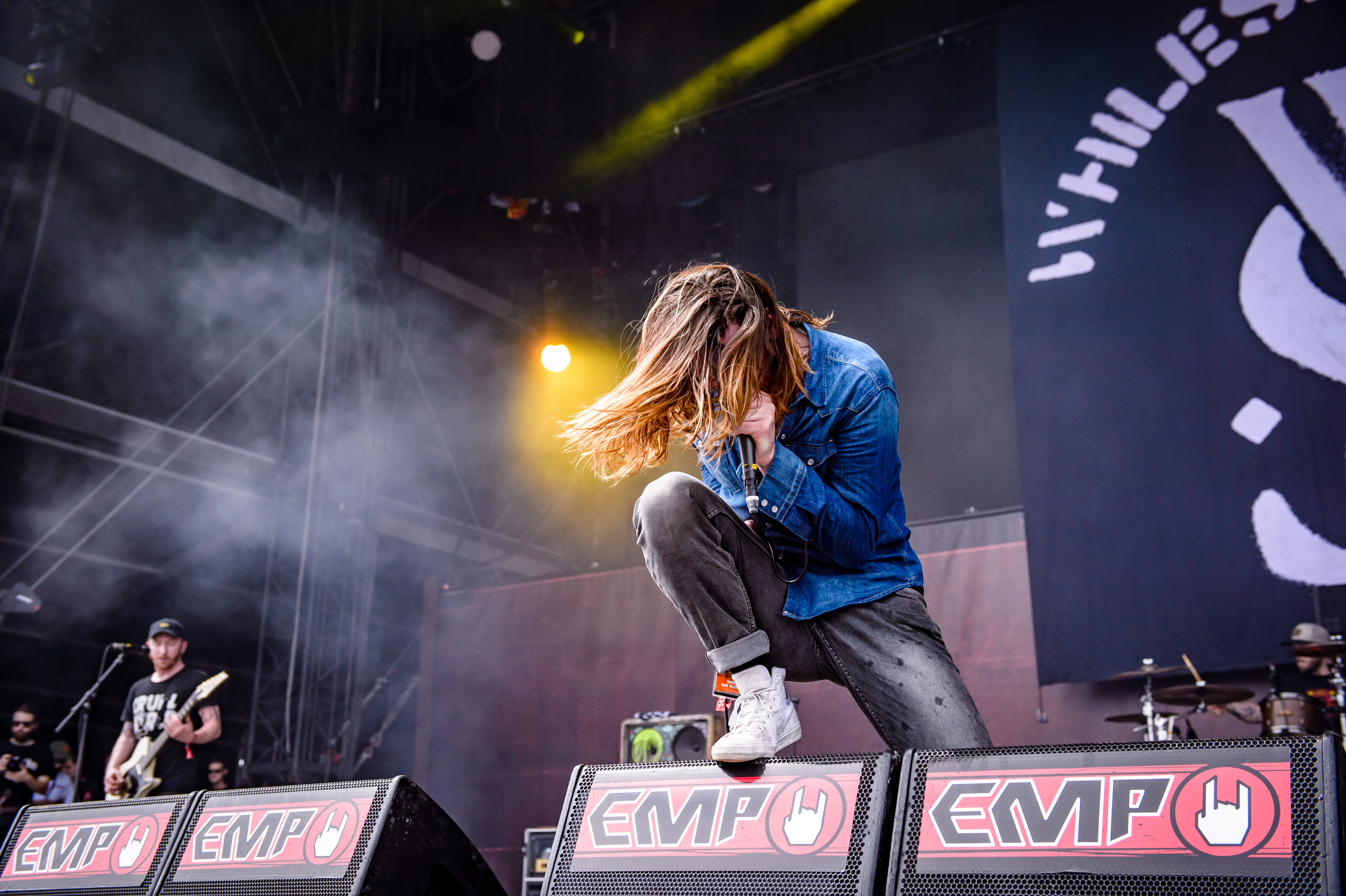
The band performing at Summer Breeze Festival in 2017

On 20 January 2017, the band released the third single and title track "You Are We". On 23 February, they released a song titled "Silence Speaks" featuring Oliver Sykes, vocalist of Bring Me the Horizon. In April 2017, the group embarked on a month long tour of the United Kingdom and Ireland. On 17 April, four days before the album release, the band released the fifth single "Feel". On 2 May 2018, the band announced the deluxe edition of You Are We set for release on 20 July 2018, featuring unheard material, demos and live tracks from their September 2017 stripped down show at St. Pancras Church.

=== So What? (2018–2020) ===
On 7 June 2018, the band confirmed via social media that they were in the process of writing a new album. Production on the record was completed in October 2018. In an interview with Metal Hammer, lead guitarist Sean Long stated "I think people know the name While She Sleeps, but they don't have a real idea of what sort of band we are. That makes me really proud, and we are aiming to surprise people again." On 26 October, the band posted an image of an individual in a white hazmat suit and gas mask across their social media. The figure held a flash drive, which the posts said contained new music from the band, and could be retrieved from these figures at numerous locations in England.

The song on the drive was a snippet of the first single, "Anti-Social", which premiered on 28 October on Daniel P. Carter's BBC Radio 1's Rock Show. On the music video for "Anti-Social", the band announced So What? as the title for their fourth studio album. It is scheduled to be released 1 March 2019 through Sleeps Brothers, their own label, and in collaboration with Spinefarm Records. The band said that they wanted total creative control and so chose to self-release and partner up with a label. UK and European tour dates in February 2019 were announced in support of the album as well as the support acts, Stray from the Path, Trash Boat and Landmvrks. On 21 December, the band released the single "Haunt Me" and its corresponding music video, directed by bassist Aaron Mackenzie. Three weeks later, it was announced that the band would be supporting Architects on the North American leg of their "Holy Hell" headlining tour, along with Thy Art Is Murder.

On 30 January 2019, the band released the third single from the album "The Guilty Party". On 18 February, the band released a behind-the-scenes documentary from filmmaker Roscoe Neil, detailing the album's recording process and some difficulties the band faced leading up to the album's release. On 24 February, five days before album release, the band released the fourth single "Elephant". On 6 December, the band released a new single, "Fakers Plague" and its corresponding music video. The band released it along with a special phone-sized prism that let the viewers watch the video as a transparent image projected from viewers' device.

=== Sleeps Society (2020–2023) ===
On 15 October 2020, the band released the first single and title track "Sleeps Society" along with an accompanying music video. That same day, the band announced that their fifth studio album Sleeps Society would be released on 16 April 2021. They also revealed the album cover and unveiled their new members subscription service called Sleeps Society via the Patreon platform. Through the service, fans can contribute and subscribe with monthly donations to the band, and in turn contributors will have access to exclusive perks such as merchandise, secret shows, early access to tickets, podcasts, play throughs, tips, and more.

On 7 February 2021, the band released the second single "You Are All You Need", which debuted on Daniel P. Carter's BBC Radio 1's Rock Show. At the same time, the band revealed the official track list of the album. Guitarist Sean Long commented about the track: "We somehow managed to inject enough personal inspiration from each member for it to completely embody 'the Sleeps sound' with ease." On 18 March, one month before the album release, the band released the third single "Nervous" featuring Simon Neil of Biffy Clyro and its corresponding music video. On 19 April, the band shared that the album Sleeps Society would not be able to officially chart as they chose to sacrifice this to be able to keep paying their touring crew. On 14 April 2022, the band released the fourth single "Eye to Eye" while also announcing the deluxe edition of the album which was released on 3 June. At the same time, the band officially revealed the album cover and the track list, which included the previously released single "Fakers Plague".

=== Self Hell (2023–present) ===
On 13 September 2023, the band released the first single and title track "Self Hell" along with an accompanying music video. That same day, the band announced that their sixth studio album Self Hell would be released on 29 March 2024. On 7 December, the band unveiled the second single "Down" featuring Alex Taylor of Malevolence. On 14 February 2024, the band premiered the third single "To the Flowers" and its corresponding music video. On 21 March, one week before the album release, the band released the fourth single "Leave Me Alone".

== Musical style and influences ==
While She Sleeps' musical style has often been described as metallic hardcore (hardcore punk-leaning metalcore) by reviewers. Other critics have called them melodic hardcore. They have cited Thrice, Slipknot, Marilyn Manson, Foo Fighters, Rancid, Killswitch Engage, Underoath, Refused, Linkin Park, Comeback Kid, Sick of It All, Trash Talk, Cancer Bats, Gallows, Bring Me the Horizon, Michael Jackson and Alexisonfire as musical influences. The band's sound typically features heavily down-tuned guitars, thick bass tones, screamed vocals, singing and fast-paced drumming – occasionally complemented by melodic guitar tones and piano interludes. When questioned about the progression between their second EP The North Stands for Nothing and their 2012 studio album This Is the Six, guitarist Welsh said that they have not changed their sound drastically, saying "it's super heavy but then it's melodic too".

== Band name ==
In an EMP interview in 2013, the singer Taylor explained that the name of the band originated from a magazine with a story of a woman murdering her husband while he slept, and changed it to "she" instead of "he." Taylor also explained that he likes to view the name as a reference to a vehicle or a ship sunken in the bottom of the sea, as ships and other vehicles are often referred with the feminine pronoun.

== Band members ==
While She Sleeps live at Rock am Ring 2019

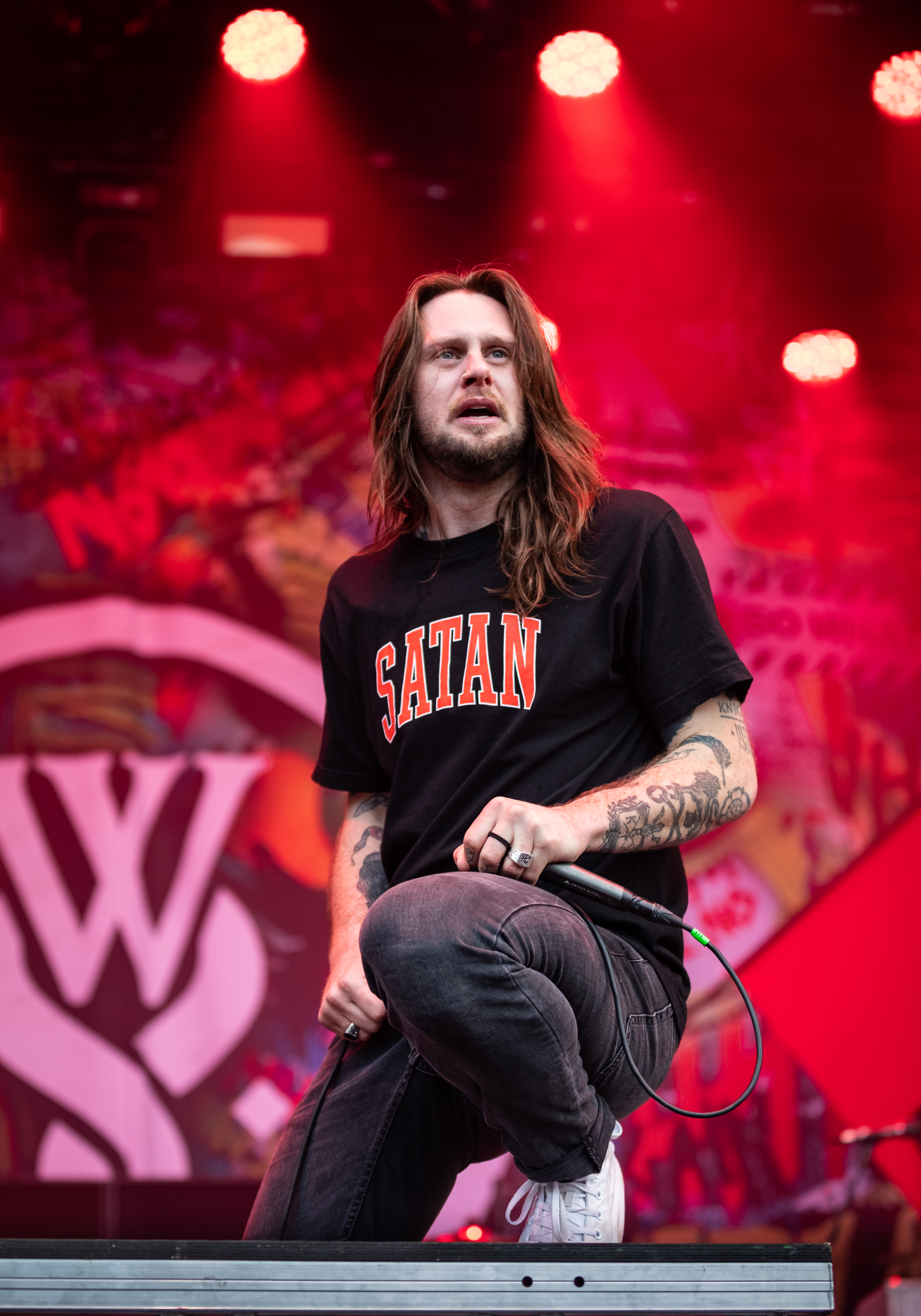
Vocalist Lawrence Taylor

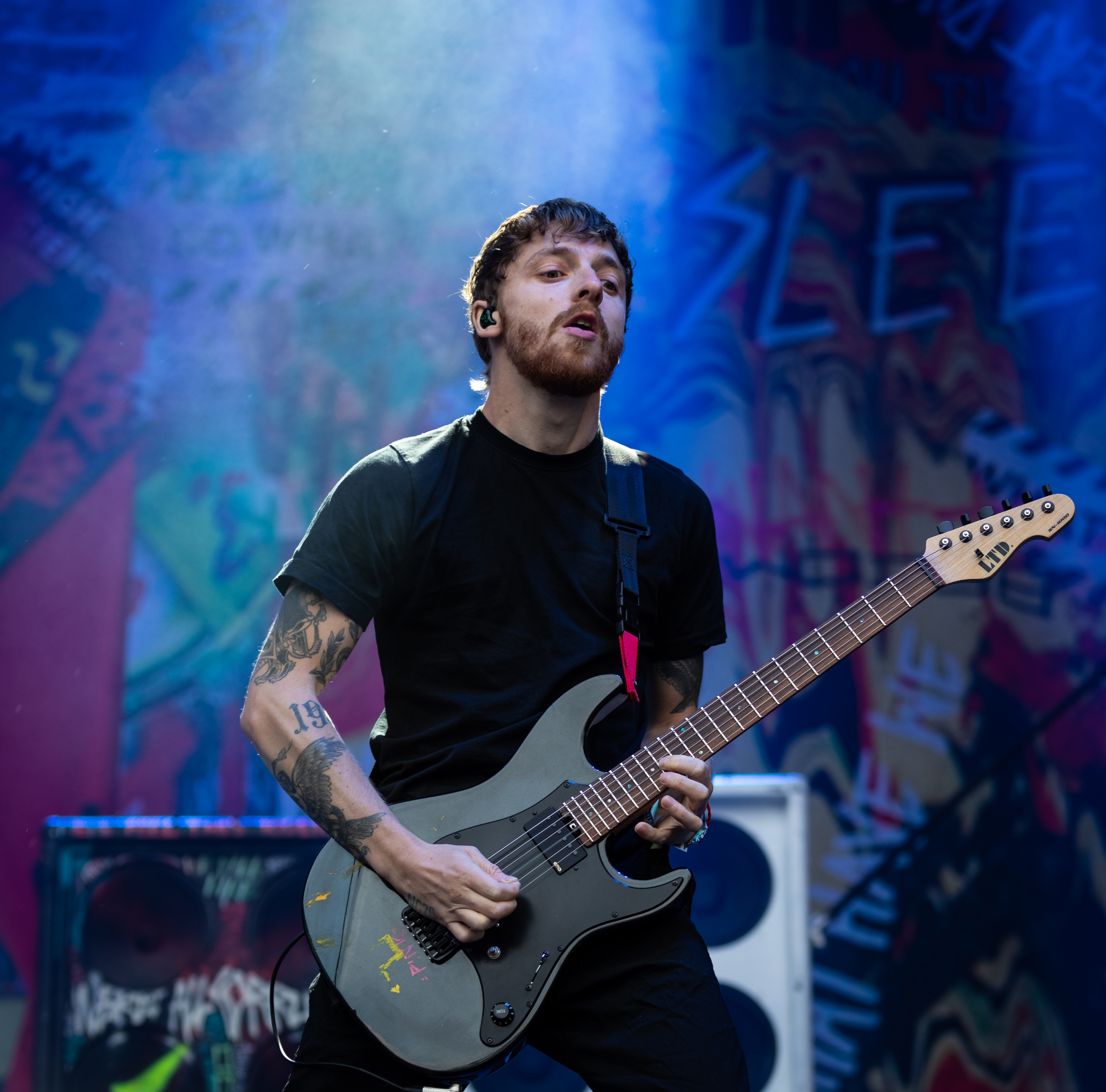
Lead guitarist Sean Long

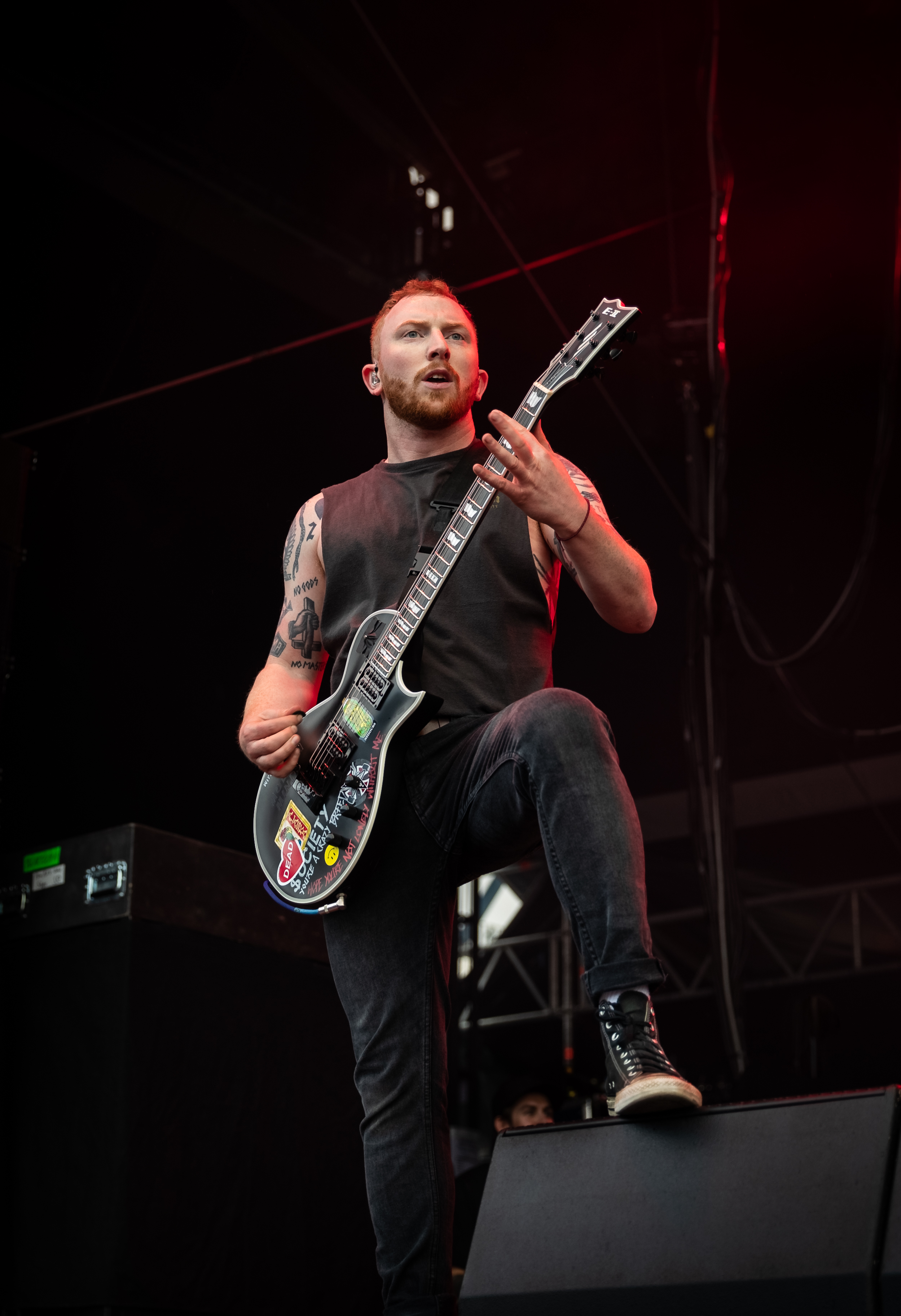
Rhythm guitarist Mat Welsh

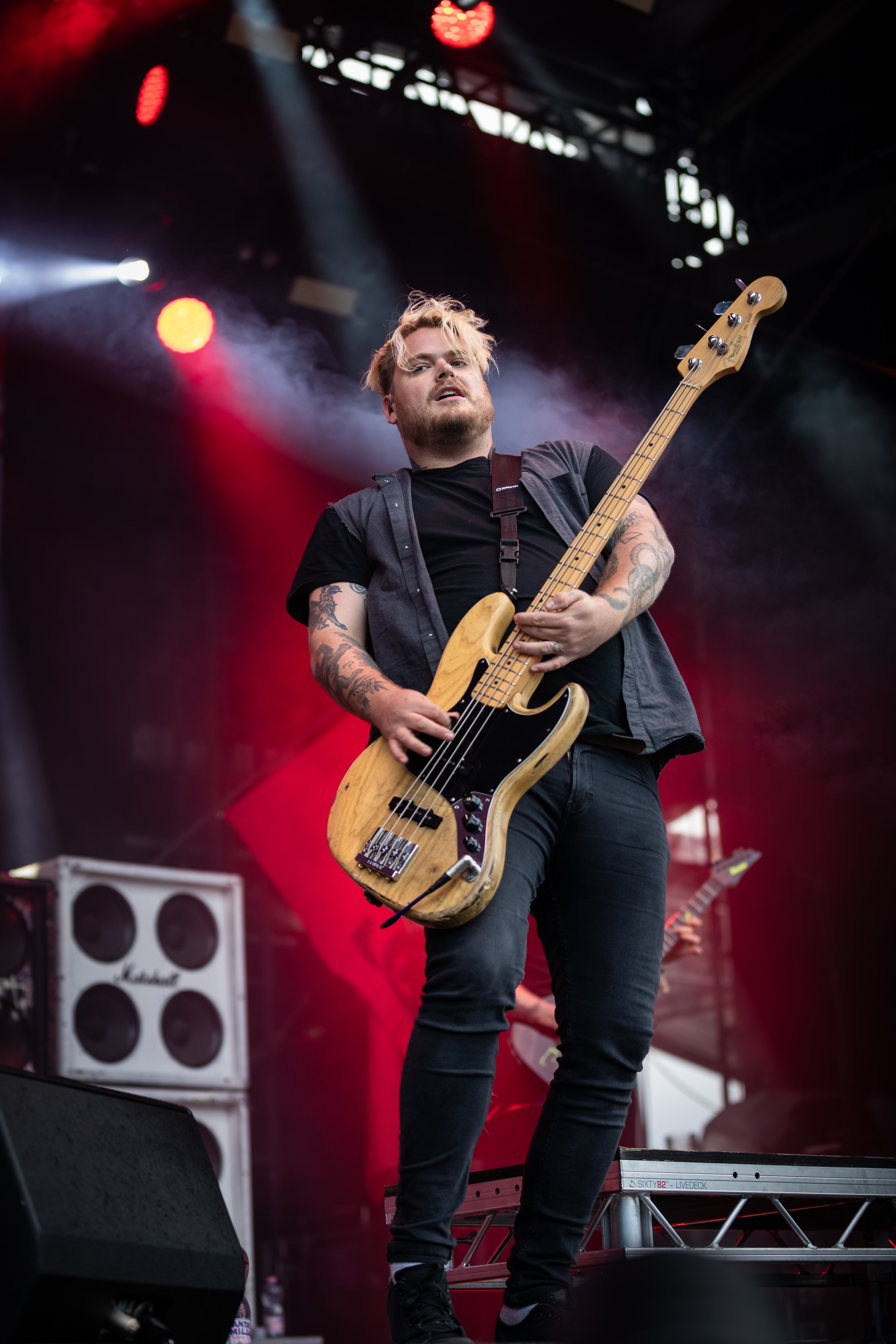
Bassist Aaran McKenzie

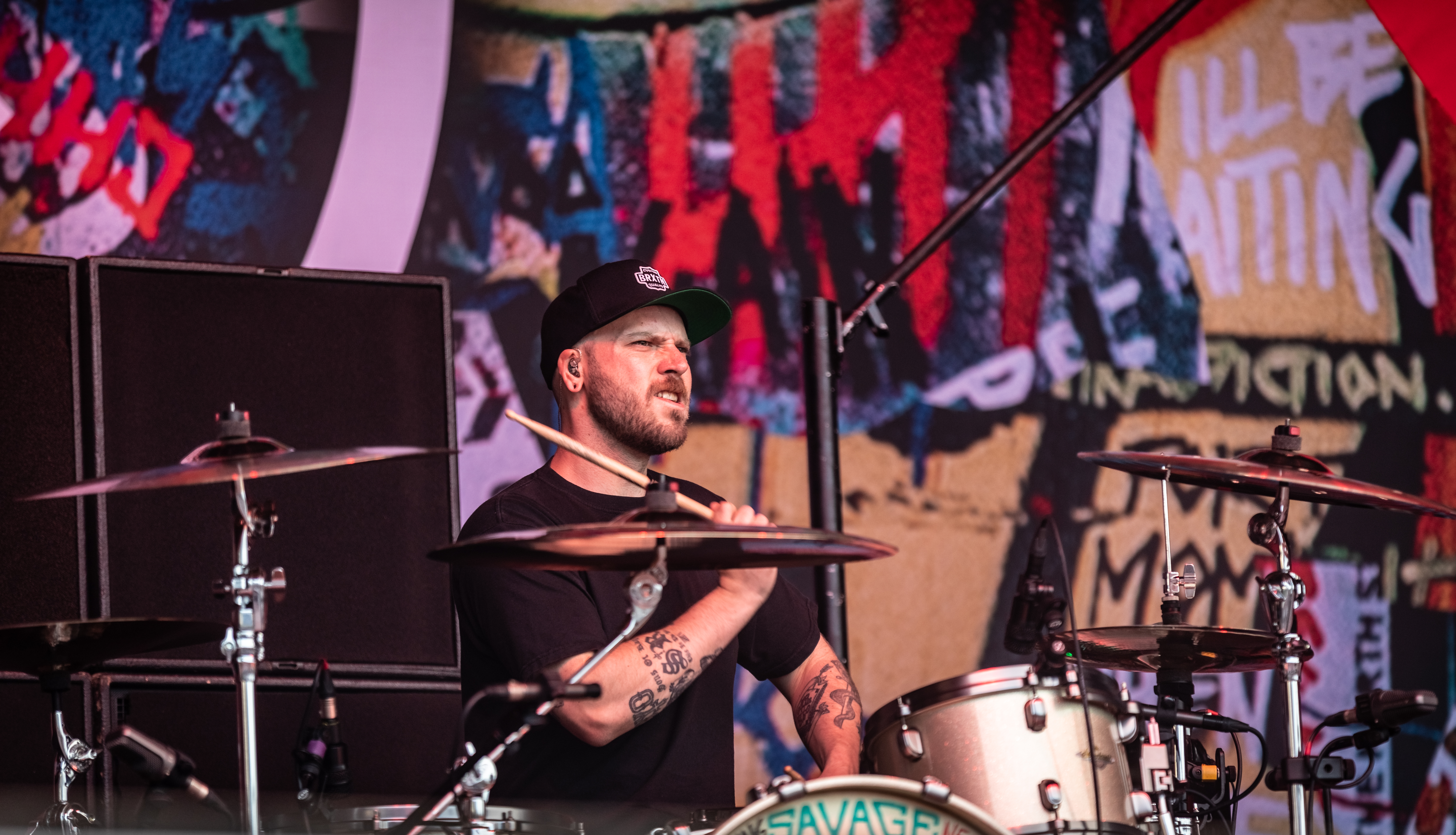
Drummer Adam Savage

Current

- Sean Long – lead guitar, backing vocals (2006–present)
- Aaran McKenzie – bass, backing vocals (2006–present)
- Adam "Sav" Savage – drums, percussion (2006–present)
- Mat Welsh – rhythm guitar, piano, vocals (2006–present)
- Lawrence "Loz" Taylor – lead vocals (2009–present)

Former

- Jordan Widdowson – lead vocals (2006–2009)

== Discography ==
=== Studio albums ===
Title	Details	Peak chart positions							
Title	Details	UK	AUS	AUT	BEL (FL)	GER	SCO	SWI	US Heat.
This Is the Six	Released: 13 August 2012; Label: Search and Destroy, Sony, The End; Format: LP, CD, streaming	27	—	—	—	—	27	—	—
Brainwashed	Released: 23 March 2015; Label: Search and Destroy, Sony, Razor & Tie, Concord; Format: LP, CD, streaming	29	—	—	—	93	35	—	—
You Are We	Released: 21 April 2017; Label: Sleeps Brothers, SharpTone, Arising Empire, UNFD; Format: LP, CD, streaming	8	26	16	31	15	14	31	5
So What?	Released: 1 March 2019; Label: Sleeps Brothers, Search and Destroy, Spinefarm, UNFD, Universal; Format: LP, CD, streaming	21	63	14	130	8	14	22	—
Sleeps Society	Released: 16 April 2021; Label: Sleeps Brothers, Search and Destroy, Spinefarm, Universal; Format: LP, CD, streaming	59	—	11	131	13	44	22	—
Self Hell	Released: 29 March 2024; Label: Sleeps Brothers, Spinefarm; Format: LP, CD, streaming	51	—	40	—	27	67	49	—

=== EPs ===
- And This Is Just the Start (2006)
- Split (2009)
- The North Stands for Nothing (2010)

== Videography ==
=== Music videos ===
Song	Year	Album	Director(s)
"Crows"	2011	The North Stands for Nothing	Tom Welsh
"Be(lie)ve"	2011	The North Stands for Nothing (Deluxe Edition) and This Is the Six	Tom Welsh
"This Is the Six"	2012	This Is the Six	Tom Welsh
"Dead Behind the Eyes"	2012	This Is the Six	GETDELUXE Films
"Seven Hills"	2012	This Is the Six	Tom Welsh
"Our Courage, Our Cancer"	2012	This Is the Six	Stuart Birchall
"Death Toll"	2013	This Is the Six (Deluxe Edition)	Ben Thornley & Paul Burrows
"New World Torture"	2014	Brainwashed	—N/a
"Four Walls"	2014	Brainwashed	Tom Welsh
"Our Legacy"	2015	Brainwashed	Tom Welsh
"Brainwashed"	2015	Brainwashed	—N/a
"Civil Isolation"	2016	You Are We	—N/a
"Hurricane"	2016	You Are We	Tom Welsh
"You Are We"	2017	You Are We	—N/a
"Silence Speaks"	2017	You Are We	Tom Welsh & Taylor Fawcett
"Feel"	2017	You Are We	Aaran McKenzie
"Empire of Silence"	2017	You Are We	Ryan Chang
"Steal the Sun"	2017	You Are We	Ryan Chang & Mat Welsh
"Anti-Social"	2018	So What?	Tom Welsh & Taylor Fawcett
"Haunt Me"	2018	So What?	Aaran McKenzie
"The Guilty Party"	2019	So What?	Tom Welsh & Taylor Fawcett
"Elephant"	2019	So What?	Aaran McKenzie
"I've Seen It All"	2019	So What?	Aaran McKenzie
"Fakers Plague"	2019	Sleeps Society (Deluxe Edition)	—N/a
"Gates of Paradise"	2020	So What?	Aaran McKenzie
"Sleeps Society"	2020	Sleeps Society	—N/a
"You Are All You Need"	2021	Sleeps Society	—N/a
"Nervous"	2021	Sleeps Society	—N/a
"Eye to Eye"	2022	Sleeps Society (Deluxe Edition)	Aaran McKenzie
"Self Hell"	2023	Self Hell	—N/a
"To the Flowers"	2024	Self Hell	While She Sleeps

== Documentary ==
The band released a documentary called 20 Days of Sleeps directed by Tom Welsh.

The band released a documentary called So What? The Documentary directed by Roscoe Neil.

== Awards ==
Kerrang! Awards

Year	Nominee / work	Award	Result
2012	While She Sleeps	Best British Newcomer	Won

Heavy Music Awards

Year	Nominee / work	Award	Result
2018	You Are We	Best Album	Won
