= Ruth Amos =

British entrepreneur and inventor of the StairSteady

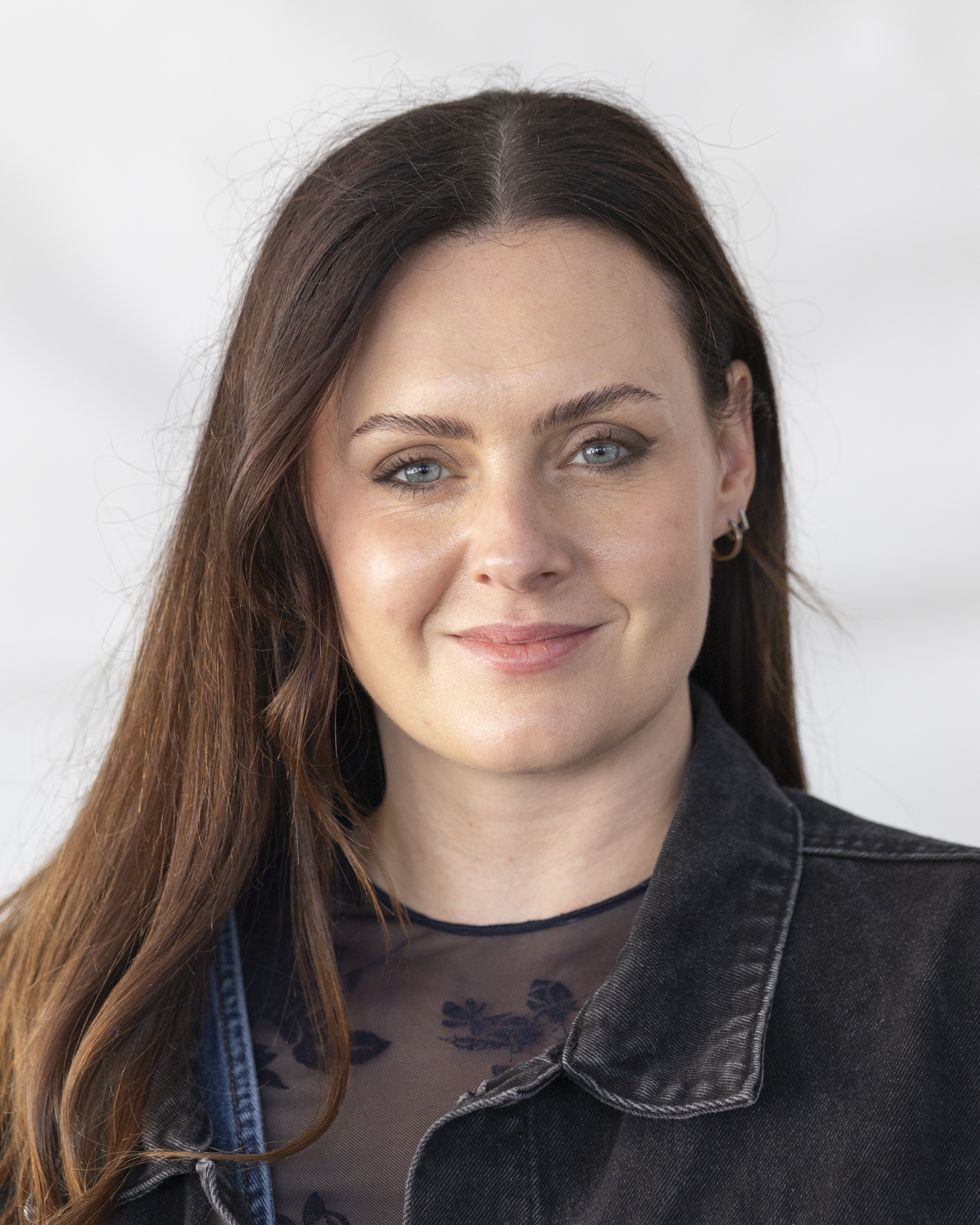
- Amos in 2026
- Born: 13 December 1989 (age 36)
- Education: Eckington School
- Occupations: Owner, StairSteady Ltd
- Website: www.stairsteady.net

Ruth Amos (born 13 December 1989) is a British entrepreneur and inventor of the StairSteady.

The StairSteady is an aid to enable people with limited mobility to use their stairs confidently and safely. Amos designed it as part of a GCSE resistant materials project as a response to her teacher’s challenge to design an aid for people with limited mobility to use their stairs. She was prompted to do this as the father of one of her teachers had recently had a stroke. Her product was launched in April 2008 at Naidex, a national healthcare show, and StairSteady ltd started trading September 2008.

Amos won the 2006 Young Engineer of the Year award in Britain with her idea. She was also picked as the youngest ever of Britain's "Heroines For Hard Times" 35 women under 35 by Management Today, Derbyshire Young Achiever 2006, she was the first ever Women of the Future "YoungStar" award winner, and she was listed on the Yorkshire 42 under 42 in May 2010. The StairSteady won the British Healthcare Trade Association product of the year in 2014 and Amos received the Electronics Weekly Bright Sparks Award in 2018.

She co-founded the YouTube channel Kids Invent Stuff with fellow inventor Shawn Brown. Kids Invent Stuff was recognised as a channel on ‘The Rise’ by Youtube and Colin Furze.
