= This Is the Six =

Studio album by While She Sleeps
- Released: 13 August 2012
- Recorded: 1 November 2011 – February 2012
- Studios: Chapel Studios, South Thoresby, Lincolnshire, England; Treehouse Studios, Chesterfield, Derbyshire; Undisclosed Studio, Wales
- Genre: Metalcore
- Length: 44:32
- Labels: Search and Destroy; Sony Music; The End
- Producer: Carl Bown

While She Sleeps chronology
| The North Stands for Nothing (2010) | This Is the Six (2012) | Brainwashed (2015) |

Singles from This Is the Six
- 1. "This Is the Six" Released: 11 May 2012; 2. "Dead Behind the Eyes" Released: 29 June 2012; 3. "Seven Hills" Released: 6 July 2012

This Is the Six is the debut studio album by English metalcore band While She Sleeps. It was released on 13 August 2012 through Search and Destroy Records. The album was produced by Carl Bown. Intending to create a more refined product over their successful EP, The North Stands for Nothing (2010), the band began preparing the album in late 2010 to early 2011, with recording beginning on 1 November 2011 and concluding in February 2012. "Dead Behind the Eyes" debuted on 3 April 2012 on BBC Radio 1, and a music video was released later that day; the title track "This Is the Six" was teased two weeks later, and was released as the first official single from the album on 13 May 2012. Controversy followed the next day for its debut on a late-morning broadcast of Radio 1 with Fearne Cotton. "Dead Behind the Eyes" became the second official single on 29 June, followed by "Seven Hills", which had debuted on Radio 1 on 25 June and was released as a single on 6 July.

Praised for its consistently heavy mix of hardcore punk and heavy metal and likened to their hometown Sheffield peers Bring Me the Horizon, This Is the Six debuted at No. 27 on the UK Album Chart and Scottish Albums Chart, and spent one week on each of them. The album peaked in the top two of the UK's Rock & Metal Chart.

== Background and recording ==
Work on While She Sleeps' first full-length album began shortly after the release of their third mini-album The North Stands for Nothing. In a video published by the band in October 2010, vocalist Lawrence Taylor spoke of how they'd begun work on new material and that it is "just the beginning of the thinking process". Throughout most of 2010 and 2011 the band toured heavily in UK and Europe, working on new material between tours at their home studio in Sheffield, England. On 15 March 2011, While She Sleeps released the single "Be(lie)ve", originally described as a way of putting out some new material to bridge the gap between albums. It later appeared as the eighth track on the new album. Much of the initial writing for the album was attributed to lead guitarist Sean Long. Bassist Aaran Mackenzie describes him as "the main riff writer" while drummer Adam Savage explains, "[Long] does a lot of pre-pros, then he brings it to the band and we'll have a listen and a jam". In October 2011, the band released a video discussing their plans for the next album, stating that they had written 10 tracks and "found the sound of the record". Despite their preparation, the band said that things could change as they are "not a band that gets a track fully finished before recording it", allowing them the freedom to "still make some final decisions in the studio".

On 1 November 2011, While She Sleeps entered Chapel Studios in Lincolnshire, England to begin recording drums for the album. After all the drums were tracked, the band moved to Treehouse Studios in Chesterfield, England, to record the rest of the album. This was the first time the band had recorded their music in a professional recording studio and worked with a producer. When speaking about working with producer Carl Bown, guitarist Long said that "it's cool having someone we don't really know giving us input" adding that he thinks they need that "outsiders view". He also stated that they changed songs as they went along, with guitarist Welsh commenting that "we're going with a really gut instinct" and trying different ideas on the spot. Recording for the majority of the album ended some time in December, however, some extra piano parts were recorded at an undisclosed studio in Wales in February 2012.

== Composition ==
=== Influences, style and themes ===
Prior to the release of the album, band members promised that the general sound of This Is the Six would be similar to The North Stands for Nothing but "a lot more polished", adding that "the melodic parts you’re used to will be more melodic and the heavy parts heavier". Taylor explained that "[the band] went in to recording without a genre in [their] heads"; instead, they simply wanted to write together without worrying about the result. While discussing the album with BBC Radio 1 DJ Daniel P. Carter, guitarist Long said that "some of the stuff we do on the album you couldn't really do as a straight hardcore band or a straight metal band", concluding that "it kind of clashes in-between". Many critics have described This Is the Six as metalcore. Andrew Neufeld, lead vocalist of the Canadian hardcore punk band Comeback Kid, is featured on the album's opener, "Dead Behind the Eyes".

The album title refers to the close relationship that While She Sleeps have with their fans – 'The Six' are the five members of the band and their fan base. The band also call themselves 'Sleeps' for short and there is 6 letters in that name, as well as referring to their fans as the 'Sleeps Army'. Taylor revealed in an interview that the lyrics on the album follow a general theme about the current state of England. When talking about the track "Love at War", he explained; "that's just about how our forefathers have fought for our country and the respect that we feel like they don't get [from] a lot of people".

== Release and promotion ==
On 3 April 2012, Daniel P. Carter premiered the track "Dead Behind the Eyes" on BBC Radio 1 – subsequently playing it twice in the same show due to high demand. Later that day, While She Sleeps released a music video and free download for the track on the Kerrang! website. On 17 April, Carter premiered the title track "This Is the Six" on his BBC Radio 1 show. Alongside a music video, the track was released as the first single from the album on 13 May 2012. The following day, the single was played by Fearne Cotton and Nick Grimshaw on their respective BBC Radio 1 shows. In contrast to their appearances on Carter's show (which is broadcast between 12:00 am and 2:00 am) this was not the first time While She Sleeps had been played on national radio during the day, as Alex Baker played them on national radio during the day. Their appearance on Cotton's show was met with a mixed reception from her listeners. Bassist Mackenzie said in an interview "it was weird for something that heavy to be played at about 11:30am" and that it "split the country", drummer Savage added that they "kind of liked how much it pissed [some] people off". On 25 June, Carter premiered the track "Seven Hills" on his BBC Radio 1 show, and on 5 July he premiered "Love at War" while sitting in for Zane Lowe's show. This Is the Six was originally scheduled for release on 6 August 2012, however it was postponed and released on 13 August 2012 through Search and Destroy Records.

== Critical reception ==
Professional ratings
Review scores
| Source | Rating |
|---|---|
| AllMusic | 3.5/5 stars |
| BBC | favourable |
| Big Cheese | 4/5 stars |
| DIY | 3.5/5 stars |
| Exclaim! | 7/10 stars |
| Kerrang! | 5/5 stars |
| Metal Hammer | 9/10 stars |
| The Observer | 3/5 stars |
| Rock Sound | 9/10 stars |

This Is the Six received mostly positive reviews and critical acclaim from music critics. Writing for Big Cheese, Nick Mann praised the authenticity of the album's production, lauding "every instrument sounding crisp, clear and powerful" without adding too many aspects, "meaning that the occasional use of piano and pseudo-choral vocals add to, rather than detract from the underlying intensity that drives the record forward." Mann noted the band's metallic intensity was immediately apparent in the first track, "Dead Behind the Eyes", and that this remained consistent throughout the album, further praising "Seven Hills" and "Be(lie)ve" as other standouts. The Guardian's Ally Carnwath recognised the band's ambition to transcend different heavy metal audiences; though it intentionally strayed away from the mainstream with "sludgy, distorted guitars, breakneck drums and larynx-shredding vocals", she opined that the guitar lines on "Seven Hills" and chanted choruses of "Love at War" presented the greatest potential for the record to reach that goal. She also expressed surprise at the "thunderously heavy" title track, "This Is the Six", receiving airplay on Cotton's radio station.

Jon O'Brien of AllMusic noted that although While She Sleeps were largely overshadowed in the British metalcore scene by fellow Sheffield band Bring Me the Horizon, the record sounded promising enough that "they might not be second-best for too much longer." O'Brien especially praised the band's more melodic forays away from their heaviest approach such as "Reunite" and the instrumental "The Chapel", though he also recognised that most of the tracks "are designed to be shouted along with from the rooftops". By contrast, for the BBC, Raziq Rauf opined that the band's talents were best displayed when "[they] dispense with the interludes and go straight down the line with [a] ferocious modern fusion of metal and hardcore," highlighting the Scandinavian metal influences of "Be(lie)ve" and the "decade’s worth of fury" contained within "The Plague of a New Age".

== Track listing ==
All songs written and composed by While She Sleeps.

| No. | Title | Length |
|---|---|---|
| 1. | "Dead Behind the Eyes" (featuring Andrew Neufeld) | 4:04 |
| 2. | "False Freedom" | 3:47 |
| 3. | "Satisfied in Suffering" | 3:13 |
| 4. | "Seven Hills" | 4:20 |
| 5. | "Our Courage, Our Cancer" | 3:34 |
| 6. | "This Is the Six" | 4:44 |
| 7. | "The Chapel" | 2:15 |
| 8. | "Be(lie)ve" (re-recorded version; original version from The North Stands for Nothing) | 3:54 |
| 9. | "Until the Death" | 4:26 |
| 10. | "Love at War" | 4:43 |
| 11. | "The Plague of a New Age" | 4:18 |
| 12. | "Reunite" | 1:14 |
| Total length: | | 44:32 |

iTunes bonus tracks
| No. | Title | Length |
|---|---|---|
| 13. | "Our Courage, Our Cancer" (acoustic) | 3:31 |
| 14. | "False Freedom" (acoustic) | 2:36 |
| 15. | "This Is the Six" (track by track) |

Deluxe Edition bonus tracks
| No. | Title | Length |
|---|---|---|
| 13. | "Death Toll" | 3:55 |
| 14. | "Weathered Man" ("Love at War" alternate version) | 2:51 |
| 15. | "False Freedom" (acoustic) | 2:36 |
| 16. | "Seven Hills" (alternate version; featuring Jenny Staniforth) | 5:00 |
| 17. | "Our Courage, Our Cancer" (acoustic) | 3:31 |
| 18. | "Sickness Over Health" ("Until the Death" alternate version) | 4:01 |
| Total length: | | 66:26 |

== Personnel ==
Credits adapted from Discogs.

While She Sleeps

- Lawrence "Loz" Taylor – lead vocals
- Mat Welsh – rhythm guitar, vocals, piano
- Sean Long – lead guitar, backing vocals
- Aaran McKenzie – bass, backing vocals
- Adam "Sav" Savage – drums, percussion

Additional musicians

- Andrew Neufeld of Comeback Kid – guest vocals on track 1, "Dead Behind the Eyes"

Additional personnel

- Carl Bown – production, mixing
- Martyn Ford – additional production
- Jim Finder – engineering, recording
- Colin Richardson – mixing
- Andy Sneap – mastering
- Craig Jennings and Olly Mitchell – management
- Jon Barmby – design

== Charts ==
| Chart (2012) | Peak position |
|---|---|
| Scottish Albums (Official Charts) | 27 |
| UK Albums (Official Charts) | 27 |
| UK Rock & Metal Albums (Official Charts) | 2 |
