= Brainwashed (While She Sleeps album) =

Studio album by While She Sleeps
- Released: 23 March 2015
- Recorded: 2014
- Genre: Metalcore
- Length: 45:53
- Labels: Search and Destroy; Sony Music; Razor & Tie; Concord
- Producer: Carl Bown

While She Sleeps chronology
This Is the Six (2012)	Brainwashed (2015)	You Are We (2017)

Singles from Brainwashed
- 1. "New World Torture" Released: 27 October 2014; 2. "Four Walls" Released: 26 November 2014; 3. "Trophies of Violence" Released: 15 January 2015; 4. "Our Legacy" Released: 15 March 2015; 5. "Brainwashed" Released: 17 August 2015

Brainwashed is the second studio album by English metalcore band While She Sleeps. It was released on 23 March 2015 through Search and Destroy Records. The album was produced by Carl Bown.

== Release and promotion ==
Four tracks taken from the album were revealed prior to release, each with accompanying videos that were available to download instantly from iTunes. "New World Torture", "Four Walls" (premiered exclusively on Gigwise), "Trophies of Violence" and "Our Legacy". To support the album, the band embarked on a co-headline tour with Cancer Bats in April 2015, while also playing 2015's Warped Tour.

== Critical reception ==
Professional ratings
Review scores
Source	Rating
Dead Press!	8/10 stars
Hit the Floor	4.5/5 stars
Kerrang!	5/5 stars
Metal Hammer	8/10 stars
Rock Sound	8/10 stars

The album received positive reviews from critics. Tony Bliss from Dead Press! rated the album positively calling it: "Brainwashed is a rallying call, harnessing the intense power of all their past personal pressure and recapturing that thrumming, era defining vitality which sees them remain scene kingpins. We can tell that While She Sleeps have come back from the very brink, and they sound all the more unified for it. A more than welcome return."

== Commercial performance ==
The album was included at number 27 on Rock Sound's top 50 releases of 2015 list.

== Track listing ==
Standard CD
No.	Title	Length
1.	"The Divide"	0:52
2.	"New World Torture"	4:40
3.	"Brainwashed"	3:28
4.	"Our Legacy"	4:07
5.	"Four Walls"	5:07
6.	"Torment"	3:48
7.	"Kangaezu Ni"	1:21
8.	"Life in Tension"	3:41
9.	"Trophies of Violence"	5:01
10.	"No Sides, No Enemies"	5:05
11.	"Method in Madness"	3:54
12.	"Modern Minds"	4:49
Total length:		45:53

Deluxe edition
No.	Title	Length
1.	"The Divide"	0:52
2.	"New World Torture"	4:40
3.	"Your Evolution" (bonus track)	4:44
4.	"Brainwashed"	3:28
5.	"We Are Alive at Night" (bonus track)	1:03
6.	"Our Legacy"	4:07
7.	"Four Walls"	5:07
8.	"Torment"	3:48
9.	"Kangaezu Ni"	1:21
10.	"Life in Tension"	3:41
11.	"Trophies of Violence"	5:01
12.	"No Sides, No Enemies"	5:05
13.	"The Woods" (bonus track)	2:29
14.	"Method in Madness"	3:54
15.	"Modern Minds"	4:49
Total length:		54:16

== Personnel ==
Credits adapted from Discogs.

While She Sleeps

- Lawrence "Loz" Taylor – lead vocals
- Sean Long – lead guitar, backing vocals
- Mat Welsh – rhythm guitar, vocals, piano, artwork, design
- Aaran McKenzie – bass, backing vocals
- Adam "Sav" Savage – drums, percussion, artwork, design

Additional personnel

- Carl Bown – production, engineering, mixing
- Jim Pinder – engineering
- Drew Lawson – vocal engineering
- Colin Richardson – mixing
- Ted Jensen – mastering
- Giles Smith and Tom Welsh – photography

== Release history ==
Country	Date	Label	Format
United Kingdom	23 March 2015	Search and Destroy Records	CD
United States	21 April 2015	Razor & Tie	CD
