= Emma Amos =

Emma Amos may refer to:

- Emma Amos (actress) (born 1964), English actress
- Emma Amos (painter) (1937–2020), American painter and printmaker
