= So What? (While She Sleeps album) =

Studio album by While She Sleeps
- Released: 1 March 2019
- Recorded: June–October 2018
- Studio: Six Audio, Sheffield, South Yorkshire, England; Treehouse Studios, Chesterfield, Derbyshire
- Genre: Metalcore; alternative metal
- Length: 48:30
- Label: Sleeps Brothers; Search and Destroy; Spinefarm; UNFD; Universal Music
- Producer: While She Sleeps; Carl Bown

While She Sleeps chronology
You Are We (2017)	So What? (2019)	Sleeps Society (2021)

Singles from So What?
- 1. "Anti-Social" Released: 29 October 2018; 2. "Haunt Me" Released: 21 December 2018; 3. "The Guilty Party" Released: 30 January 2019; 4. "Elephant" Released: 24 February 2019

So What? (stylised in all caps) is the fourth studio album by English metalcore band While She Sleeps. It was released on 1 March 2019, through the band's independent label Sleeps Brothers, in collaboration with Search and Destroy, Spinefarm Records, UNFD, and Universal Music. The album was produced by the band themselves and Carl Bown.

== Background and recording ==
On 7 June 2018, the band confirmed via social media that they were in the process of writing a new album. Production on the record was completed in October 2018. In an interview with Metal Hammer, guitarist Sean Long stated "I think people know the name While She Sleeps, but they don't have a real idea of what sort of band we are. That makes me really proud, and we are aiming to surprise people again."

== Release and promotion ==
On 26 October 2018, the band posted an image of an individual in a white hazmat suit and gas mask across their social media. The figure held a flash drive, which the posts said contained new music from the band, and could be retrieved from these figures at numerous locations in England. The song on the drive was a snippet of the first single, "Anti-Social", which premiered on 28 October on Daniel P. Carter's BBC Radio 1's Rock Show. On the music video for "Anti-Social", the band announced the official title for their fourth studio album and its scheduled release date. The album was released through their own label Sleeps Brothers and in collaboration with Spinefarm Records. The band said that they wanted total creative control and so chose to self-release and partner up with a label. UK and European tour dates in February 2019 were announced in support of the album as well as the support acts, Stray from the Path, Trash Boat and LANDMVRKS. On 21 December, the band released the single "Haunt Me" and its corresponding music video, directed by bassist Aaron Mackenzie. Three weeks later, it was announced that the band would be supporting Architects on the North American leg of their "Holy Hell" headlining tour, along with Thy Art Is Murder.

On 30 January 2019, the band released the third single from the album "The Guilty Party". On 18 February, the band released a behind-the-scenes documentary from filmmaker Roscoe Neil, detailing the album's recording process and some difficulties the band faced leading up to the album's release. On 24 February, five days before album release, the band released the fourth single "Elephant".

== Critical reception ==
Professional ratings
Review scores
Source	Rating
Already Heard	4.5/5 stars
Dead Press!	9/10 stars
Exclaim!	6/10 stars
Kerrang!	4/5 stars
Louder Sound	4/5 stars

So What? has received a generally positive reception for numerous music critics. Several reviews have indicated that the album is a slightly different direction for the band, drifting away from traditional metalcore roots in favor of a more alternative, even electronic, sound. Writing for Louder Sound, Stephen Hill calls the album "easily the most experimental and oddly challenging album the band have ever put together." Paul Travers of Kerrang! also notes the changes, saying "there are plenty of riff-heavy body-slams and fiery, politicised lyrics, but this is a shinier, more melodic, accessible and sonically polished affair than its predecessors." In his review for Exclaim!, Max Morin calls the album a "mixed bag where some ideas work and others don't," and criticizes it for feeling "more like a transparent attempt at marketability than genuine musical vision."

Loudwire named it one of the 50 best metal albums of 2019.

== Track listing ==
All lyrics are written by While She Sleeps; all music is composed by While She Sleeps.

No.	Title	Length
1.	"Anti-Social"	4:14
2.	"I've Seen It All"	4:12
3.	"Inspire"	4:10
4.	"So What?"	4:32
5.	"The Guilty Party"	4:26
6.	"Haunt Me"	4:31
7.	"Elephant"	4:38
8.	"Set You Free"	4:17
9.	"Good Grief"	3:38
10.	"Back of My Mind" (featuring Griffin Dickinson of SHVPES)	4:27
11.	"Gates of Paradise"	5:20
Total length:		48:30

Notes

- All track titles are stylised in capital letters.

== Personnel ==
Credits adapted from AllMusic.

While She Sleeps

- Lawrence "Loz" Taylor – lead vocals
- Sean Long – lead guitar, backing vocals
- Mat Welsh – rhythm guitar, vocals, piano
- Aaran McKenzie – bass, backing vocals
- Adam "Sav" Savage – drums, percussion

Additional musicians

- Griffin Dickinson of SHVPES – additional vocals on track 10, "Back of My Mind"

Additional personnel

- Carl Bown – production, engineering, mixing, mastering
- While She Sleeps – production
- Rhys May – engineering
- Ste Kerry – mastering
- Giles Smith – photography

== Charts ==
Chart (2019)	Peak position
Australian Albums (ARIA)	63
Austrian Albums (Ö3 Austria)	14
Belgian Albums (Ultratop Flanders)	130
Belgian Albums (Ultratop Wallonia)	126
German Albums (Offizielle Top 100)	8
Scottish Albums (OCC)	14
Swiss Albums (Schweizer Hitparade)	22
UK Albums (OCC)	21
