= Heriot discography =

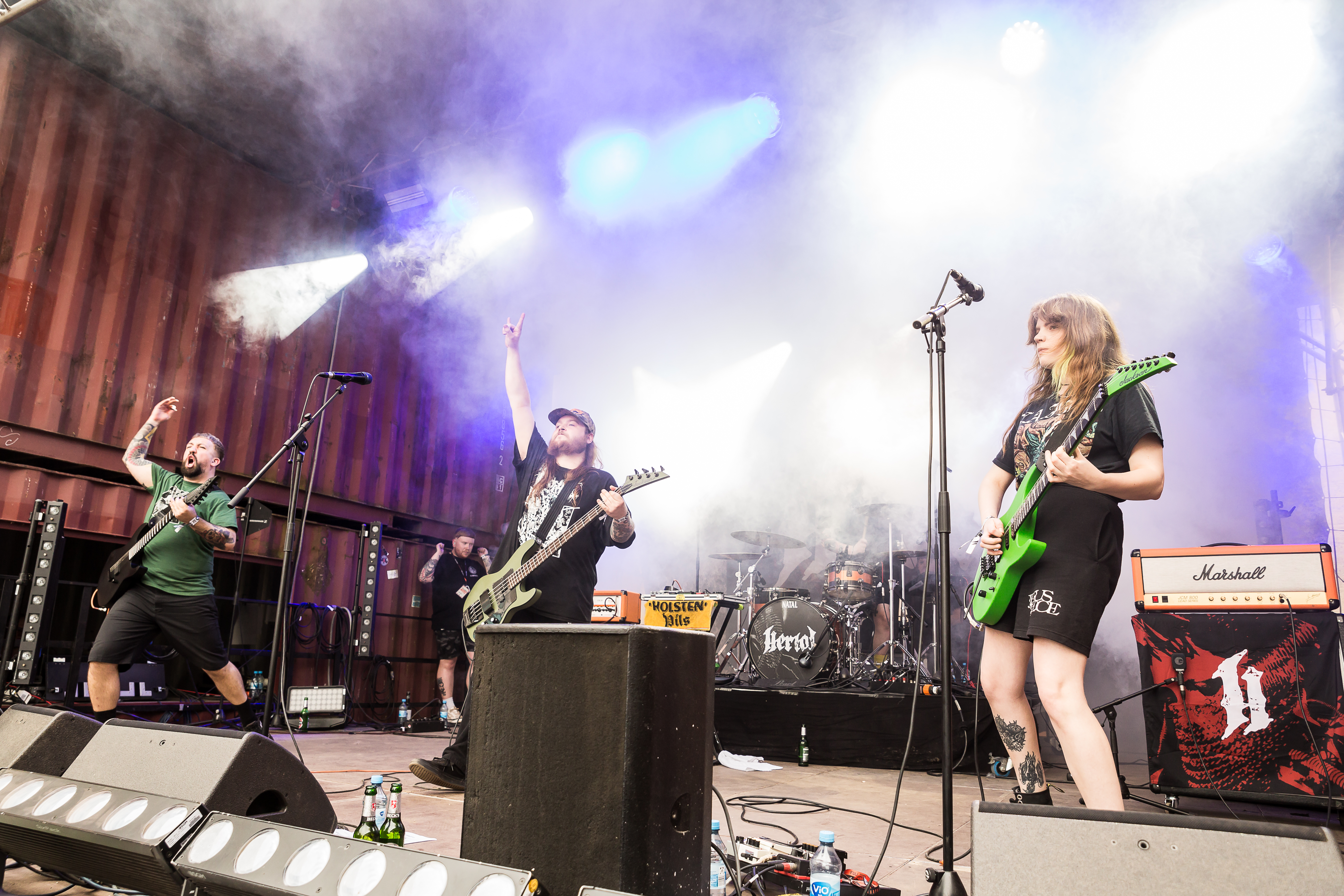
- Heriot in 2023
- Studio albums: 1
- EPs: 3
- Singles: 17
- Music videos: 16
- Splits: 1

British metalcore band Heriot has released one studio album, three EPs, seventeen singles, and sixteen music videos.

== Studio albums ==
List of studio albums, with selected details
Title	Album details	Peak chart positions	
Title	Album details	UK	UK Rock
Devoured by the Mouth of Hell	Released: 27 September 2024; Label: Century Media; Format: CD, CS, LP, DD	— (Note: Although Devoured by the Mouth of Hell did not enter the UK Albums Chart, it reached number 62 on the UK Album Downloads Chart.)	25
"—" denotes a recording that did not chart or was not released in that territory

== Extended plays ==
List of EPs, with selected details
Title	EP details
Violence	Released: January 2015; Label: Slowgod; Format: DD
World Collapse	Released: 28 October 2016; Label: Slowgod; Format: DD
Profound Morality	Released: 29 April 2022; Label: Church Road; Format: CD, CS, LP, DD

== Split releases ==
List of split releases, with selected details
Title	Split details
Heriot / Older	Released: 12 September 2015; Label: Slowgod; Format: CS, DD

== Singles ==
List of singles
Title	Year	Album
"Housefire"	2014	Violence
"China Lake"	2016	World Collapse
"Cleansed Existence"	2020	Non-album single
"Recreant"	2021	Non-album single
"Dispirit"	2021	Non-album single
"Ten Ton Hammer"	2021	Non-album single
"Near Vision / Enter the Flesh"	2021	Profound Morality
"Coalescence"	2022	Profound Morality
"Profound Morality"	2022	Profound Morality
"Profound Morality" (Dislover remix)	2022	Non-album singles
"Demure"	2023	Non-album singles
"Soul Chasm"	2023	Non-album singles
"Siege Lord"	2024	Devoured by the Mouth of Hell
"Foul Void"	2024	Devoured by the Mouth of Hell
"At the Fortress Gate"	2024	Devoured by the Mouth of Hell
"Commander of Pain"	2025	Devoured by the Mouth of Hell (Deluxe Edition)
"Master of Deceit"	2026	Devoured by the Mouth of Hell (Deluxe Edition)

=== As featured artist ===
List of singles as featured artist
Title	Year	Album
"Torx (Heriot Remix)" (original by CLT DRP)	2022	Non-album single
"DC Mini" (Boston Manor ft. Heriot)	2024	Sundiver
"The Path" (Sylosis ft. Heriot)	2024	The Path

== Music videos ==
Year	Song	Director
2015	"Violence"	Jasmine Haakerson
2016	"China Lake"	N/A
2020	"Cleansed Existence"	Harry Steel
2021	"Recreant"	Harry Steel
2021	"Dispirit"	Harry Steel
2021	"Near Vision / Enter the Flesh"	Harry Steel
2022	"Coalescence"	Harry Steel
2022	"Profound Morality"	Harry Steel
2023	"Demure"	Harry Steel
2023	"Soul Chasm"	Harry Steel
2024	"Siege Lord"	Harry Steel
2024	"Foul Void"	Harry Steel
2024	"At the Fortress Gate"	Harry Steel
2024	"Opaline"	Harry Steel
2025	"Commander of Pain"	Harry Steel
2026	"Master of Deceit"	Harry Steel
