= Profound Morality =

EP by Heriot
- Released: 29 April 2022
- Recorded: 2021
- Studios: Heriot's rehearsal space (Bristol); Slow God Audio
- Genre: Metalcore
- Length: 20:17
- Label: Church Road
- Producers: Jake Packer (a.k.a. Slow God Audio)

Heriot chronology
World Collapse (2016)	Profound Morality (2022)	Devoured by the Mouth of Hell (2024)

Singles from Profound Morality
- 1. "Near Vision / Enter the Flesh" Released: 3 December 2021; 2. "Coalescence" Released: 14 January 2022; 3. "Profound Morality" Released: 18 March 2022

Profound Morality is the third extended play by British metalcore band Heriot, released on 29 April 2022 through Church Road Records. It is the band's first release as a quartet, featuring guitarist and vocalist Debbie Gough, who joined in 2019. The band wrote and recorded the bulk of the EP in five days at their rehearsal space in Bristol in April 2021. Whilst primarily categorized as a metalcore release, Profound Morality's sound combines elements from a variety of genres, including extreme metal, hardcore, industrial and noise music. Its lyrics, inspired by the "rhetoric of wealth and class" during the COVID-19 pandemic, focus on accountability, blame, integrity, questioning power, and identifying your morals.

Three singles were released from Profound Morality, alongside music videos directed by Harry Steel. To promote the EP, Heriot performed at several festivals including 2000trees, ArcTanGent, Bloodstock and Download, and embarked on supporting tours in the United Kingdom with Rolo Tomassi, Pupil Slicer, Zeal & Ardor and Boston Manor, throughout 2022. In 2024, Metal Hammer listed it as one of the 50 greatest metal EPs of all time.

== Background and recording ==
Heriot were formed in Swindon in late 2014 by drummer Julian Gage, bassist and vocalist Jake Packer and guitarist Erhan Alman. As a three-piece, the band released two EPs, Violence (2015) and World Collapse (2016). In 2019, they added guitarist Debbie Gough to their lineup. The other members of Heriot had become friends with Gough through her old band, the Birmingham-based Dead Hands, whom they had toured with and supported in the past. After Dead Hands disbanded, Heriot considered recruiting Gough as a second guitarist, though they did not believe she would join. When Gough asked the members of Heriot to form a side project with her, they asked her to join their band instead.

Heriot worked on new material in secret at a rehearsal space in Bristol—a designated halfway point between Gough and the other members of the band, due to the 100-mile gap between them—during the COVID-19 pandemic. The addition of Gough caused a shift in the band's writing and dynamic, and Gage would credit the pandemic with providing a "creative release" that allowed them to reinvent their sound. Gough began to practice both singing and screaming during this time, which the band supported her with. In November 2020, Heriot "relaunched" themselves with the release of the single "Cleansed Existence". (Note: In an interview with RushOnRock, Gage said that Heriot saw their relaunch in 2020 "as a fresh start: the only thing that really stayed is the name." By 2022, the band had disowned and removed their pre-2020 output from streaming services and Bandcamp.) In February 2021, the band were contacted by Church Road Records and they subsequently signed to the label in April of that year. Alman and Gage cited its roster and their shared DIY work ethic, respectively, as factors that led to their signing with the label.

In April 2021, Heriot wrote and recorded the bulk of Profound Morality in five days at their rehearsal space, piecing its tracks together from a folder of riffs and ideas. Recording continued for a few months thereafter. The band opted to record an EP as they did not feel ready to record a full-length album at the time, and because they still wanted the freedom to experiment with their sound. Heriot also recorded some live industrial soundscapes which Packer later organized to make the EP flow continuously without silence. Gough said that Heriot "[wanted] to see how we can mould different soundscapes to be heavy" without relying on riffs; Gage also felt that they helped break up its pacing. The band handed in the EP in October 2021.

== Composition and lyrics ==
"Coalescence"
Ian Cohen of Pitchfork described "Coalescence" as "a self-contained syllabus of everything Heriot [does throughout] Profound Morality: bionic percussion, blast beats, vocals that span blackened, death and goth metal, tempos alternating between sludge and speed."

"Enter the Flesh"
The thrash and death metal-influenced "Enter the Flesh" is a musical throwback to two of Heriot's early influences, Nails and Power Trip.

Profound Morality has been primarily categorized as a metalcore release. The EP's sound combines and blends elements from a variety of genres, including death metal, sludge metal, doom metal, gothic metal, hardcore, post-rock, darkwave, industrial, and noise music. It also features heavy, drop-tuned riffing, tempo shifts, and electronic and atmospheric soundscapes. Blabbermouth.net identified the EP's core as "short, spiky bursts of churning, atonal hardcore", as seen in "Carmine (Fills the Hollow)", "Near Vision" and "Enter the Flesh". "Abattoir", "Abaddon", and "Mutagen"—the latter two which are instrumental interludes—rely more on an industrial and ambient sound. Critics also highlighted the vocal interplay between Packer and Gough, and the contrast between the former's guttural style and the latter's screamed or cleanly sung vocals. Gough cited Billie Eilish and Caro Tanghe (of Oathbreaker) as influences on her singing; BrooklynVegan also compared her vocals to Chelsea Wolfe and Emma Ruth Rundle.

Lyrically, Profound Morality focuses on accountability, blame, integrity, questioning power, and identifying your morals. According to Gough, the EP's general theme "is the fact there's no such thing as purity. Nobody can be absolutely good, [and] nobody can be absolutely bad". Packer said that in contrast to Heriot's earlier singles, its lyrics focus more on "dealing with the situations rather than the situations themselves". In an interview with Stereogum, Gough cited the "rhetoric of wealth and class" during the COVID-19 pandemic as an influence on the EP's lyrics, believing that it uncovered a divide in morality in relation to both factors. Though there are specific topics, Gough and Packer did not want their lyrics to "state the obvious" and instead left them open for listeners to interpret them however they wanted. The title track details "the conflict of humanity in trying to maintain a clear conscience and how our weaknesses make us real". According to Gage, the EP's title reflects humanity's present pushing of moral extremes—both good and bad—to achieve fulfillment, "and the fear of where they'll end up in the future."

== Release and promotion ==
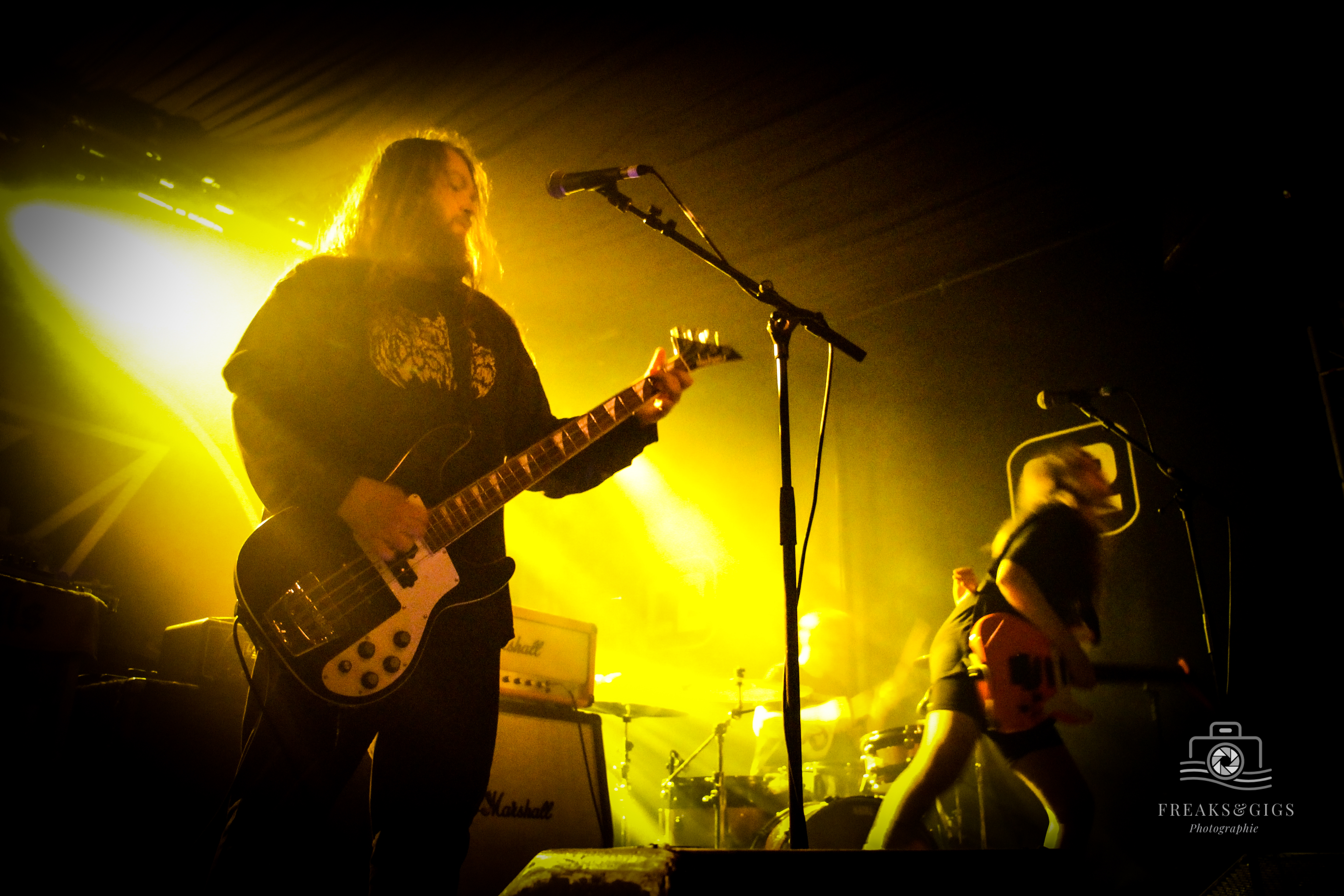
Heriot performing in Brighton in November 2022

On 3 December 2021, Heriot released "Near Vision" and "Enter the Flesh" as a double single. On 14 January 2022, the band announced Profound Morality and released its second single, "Coalescence". The EP's title track was released as its third and final single on 18 March 2022, prior to its release on 29 April 2022 through Church Road Records. Heriot filmed music videos for their singles with director and visual collaborator Harry Steel. Boolin Tunes and Distorted Sound highlighted the videos' "murky orange glow" and their "regular use of motion blur and often choppy visuals to complement [Heriot's] fast-paced songs", respectively. In line with Heriot's use of medieval motifs, the cover of Profound Morality features a chainmail cap; subtle medieval undertones were also incorporated into the band's videos.

Prior to the EP's release, Heriot supported Svalbard on their UK tour in November 2021. The band also opened for Raging Speedhorn at The Dome in London on 10 December 2021. From 16 to 24 February 2022, the band supported Rolo Tomassi and Pupil Slicer. On the last date of the tour, the band learnt that they would be performing at Download Festival in June. The members of Heriot had regularly attended Download since they were young and had booked tickets for that year's festival prior to being confirmed to play there. Though nervous about performing, the band were warmly received, and they ultimately enjoyed the experience of playing there. Between July and September 2022, Heriot performed at five more festivals; 2000trees, Dominion, Pulse of the Maggots, Bloodstock Open Air, and ArcTanGent. In October 2022, the band made their European live debut performing at the Soulcrusher Festival in the Netherlands. Heriot went on tour with Zeal & Ardor in November, but pulled out before its end due to illness. The band later embarked on a mini-tour with Boston Manor from 8 to 10 December 2022.

== Critical reception ==
Professional ratings
Review scores
Source	Rating
Blabbermouth.net	8/10
Distorted Sound	9/10
Kerrang!	4/5
Metal Hammer	7/10 marks
New Noise Magazine	5/5 stars
Pitchfork	7.6/10

In his review for Kerrang!, Dan Slessor felt that Heriot had mastered the "art [of] being truly crushing", highlighting its riffs and Packer and Gough's "dual vocal assault". BrooklynVegan reviewer Andrew Sacher stated that Profound Morality "fits in with the current metalcore revival, but [shows] Heriot are already transcending that", comparing its "unique and inventive" qualities favourably with genre contemporaries Code Orange, Knocked Loose, and Vein.fm. Nicholas Senior of New Noise Magazine called the EP "astounding" and "assured" and felt that it set a new standard for metalcore, which he found particularly impressive given it was the band's debut release.

Though he felt Heriot were still "in a state of development" regarding their lyrics and influences, Ian Cohen of Pitchfork considered the EP a "triumph of concision" that served as "a teaser of [Heriot's] boundless potential—the past, present, and possible future of metalcore." Likewise, Blabbermouth.net's Dom Lawson said that there were "shades of the familiar here and there", but said that it showcased the band with "an inexhaustible supply of great ideas, and gallons of venom in the tank." Kez Whelan of Metal Hammer believed that if Heriot expanded on the "depth to their confrontational sound", they would be "unstoppable".

Profound Morality was ranked as the sixth best metalcore album, and 41st best overall album, of 2022 by Metal Hammer. (Note: Despite being "strictly albums-only", Profound Morality was included on Metal Hammer's end-of-year list for 2022 due to the number of votes it received from the magazine's writers.) Sacher, writing for BrooklynVegan and Invisible Oranges, ranked it as the 26th best punk album and seventh best metalcore album of 2022. Heriot were nominated for the "New Noise Award" at the Kerrang! Awards 2022. The band and Profound Morality were also nominated in the "Best Live Breakthrough Act" and "Best Breakthrough Album" categories at the Heavy Music Awards 2023, but won in neither. In 2024, Metal Hammer listed it as one of the 50 greatest metal EPs of all time, calling it "the moment that Heriot smashed their way into metal's wider consciousness". James Christopher Monger of AllMusic also credited it with establishing "a dedicated fan base [for the band] in the U.K. underground metal scene".

== Track listing ==
All tracks are written by Heriot.

No.	Title	Length
1.	"Abaddon"	2:07
2.	"Coalescence"	3:13
3.	"Carmine (Fills the Hollow)"	1:42
4.	"Near Vision"	1:46
5.	"Mutagen"	2:40
6.	"Enter the Flesh"	2:22
7.	"Abattoir"	2:25
8.	"Profound Morality"	3:59
Total length:		20:17

== Personnel ==
Adapted from liner notes.

Heriot
- Erhan Alman – guitar
- Debbie Gough – guitar, vocals
- Jake Packer – bass, vocals
- Julian Gage – drums

Production
- Jake Packer (a.k.a. Slow God Audio) – production, recording
- George Lever – mixing, mastering

Artwork

- Harry Steel – artwork
- Jake Packer – artwork
