= Zenith (Bleed from Within album) =

Studio album by Bleed from Within
- Released: 4 April 2025
- Recorded: 2024
- Genre: Metalcore, melodic death metal, groove metal
- Length: 47:10
- Label: Nuclear Blast

Bleed from Within chronology
| Shrine (2022) | Zenith (2025) |

Singles from Zenith
- 1. "Hands of Sin" Released: 12 June 2024; 2. "In Place of Your Halo" Released: 4 December 2024; 3. "A Hope in Hell" Released: 21 January 2025; 4. "God Complex" Released: 2 March 2025

Professional ratings
Review scores
| Source | Rating |
|---|---|
| Boolin Tunes | 8.5/10 |
| Distorted Sound | 9/10 |
| Metal Hammer | 4/5 stars |

Zenith is the seventh studio album by Scottish metalcore band Bleed from Within. It was released on 4 April 2025 through Nuclear Blast.

== Promotion and touring ==
Singles were released in advance for "Hands of Sin", "In Place of Your Halo", and "A Hope in Hell", with "In Place of Your Halo" making its live debut two days before its single release.

The band embarked on a European tour to promote the album with After the Burial and Great American Ghost in September and October 2025.

== Track listing ==
All tracks are written by Bleed from Within.

Zenith track listing
| No. | Title | Length |
|---|---|---|
| 1. | "Violent Nature" | 3:55 |
| 2. | "In Place of Your Halo" | 3:43 |
| 3. | "Zenith" | 4:18 |
| 4. | "God Complex" | 4:10 |
| 5. | "A Hope in Hell" | 4:02 |
| 6. | "Dying Sun" | 5:28 |
| 7. | "Immortal Desire" | 4:16 |
| 8. | "Chained to Hate" | 4:03 |
| 9. | "Known by No Name" | 3:52 |
| 10. | "Hands of Sin" | 4:02 |
| 11. | "Edge of Infinity" | 5:22 |
| Total length: | | 47:11 |

== Personnel ==
Bleed from Within

- Scott Kennedy – unclean vocals
- Steven Jones – rhythm guitar, clean vocals
- Craig "Goonzi" Gowans – lead guitar
- Davie Provan – bass
- Ali Richardson – drums, percussion

Additional musicians

- Brann Dailor (Mastodon) – vocals (track 7)
- Josh Middleton (Sylosis) – vocals (track 10)
- Rabea Massaad - guitar solo (track 11)
- Hannah Boulton - backing vocals (track 3,6,9)
- Wes Hauch - guitar solo (track 8)
- Scott Wood - bagpipes (track 2)
- Grant Cassidy - marching snare (track 2)

Production and design

- Adam "Nolly" Getgood – engineering
- Ermin Hamidović – mixing, mastering
- Bill Elis – artwork
- Simon Atkinson – layout

== Charts ==
Chart performance for Zenith
| Chart (2025) | Peak position |
|---|---|
| Belgian Albums (Ultratop Wallonia) | 185 |
| German Albums (Offizielle Top 100) | 68 |
| Scottish Albums (OCC) | 9 |
| Swiss Albums (Schweizer Hitparade) | 47 |
| UK Album Downloads (OCC) | 14 |
| UK Independent Albums (OCC) | 11 |
| UK Rock & Metal Albums (OCC) | 4 |
