= Dormant Heart =

Studio album by Sylosis
- Released: 12 January 2015
- Genre: Thrash metal; progressive metal; melodic death metal; metalcore
- Length: 59:10
- Label: Nuclear Blast
- Producer: Josh Middleton

Sylosis chronology
Monolith (2012)	Dormant Heart (2015)	Cycle of Suffering (2020)

Singles from Dormant Heart
- 1. "Mercy" Released: 15 October 2014

Professional ratings
Review scores
Source	Rating
About.com	4/5 stars
Metal Hammer	7/7 stars
Ultimate Guitar	7.7/10

Dormant Heart is the fourth studio album by British heavy metal band Sylosis. It was released on 12 January 2015 in United Kingdom, 13 January 2015 in North America, and 16 January 2015 in Europe. It is the last album to feature drummer Rob Callard and bassist Carl Parnell.

== Track listing ==
All tracks are written by Sylosis

No.	Title	Length
1.	"Where the Wolves Come to Die"	2:55
2.	"Victims and Pawns"	5:00
3.	"Dormant Heart"	5:14
4.	"To Build a Tomb"	4:21
5.	"Overthrown"	4:08
6.	"Leech"	5:01
7.	"Servitude"	4:02
8.	"Indoctrinated"	4:40
9.	"Harm"	4:55
10.	"Mercy"	4:51
11.	"Callous Souls"	5:01
12.	"Quiescent"	9:02
Total length:		59:10

Bonus tracks
No.	Title	Length
13.	"Pillars Erode"	4:11
14.	"Zero (The Smashing Pumpkins cover)"	2:39
Total length:		66:00

== Personnel ==
Sylosis

- Josh Middleton – lead guitar, lead vocals
- Alex Bailey – rhythm guitar
- Carl Parnell – bass
- Rob Callard – drums

Production and design

- Scott Atkins – engineering, mixing
- Josh Middleton – producer, art concept
- Acle Kahney – mastering
- Bonfire – artwork

== Trivia ==
- Due to time restraints, Rob Callard departed Sylosis before the release of Dormant Heart, and was replaced by Bleed from Within drummer Ali Richardson, who did not contribute to the recording of the album.
