= Devoured by the Mouth of Hell =

2024 studio album by Heriot

Studio album by Heriot
- Released: 25 September 2024
- Recorded: February 2024
- Studio: Crescent Records (Swindon)
- Genre: Metalcore
- Length: 33:58
- Label: Century Media
- Producers: Jake Packer; Josh Middleton

Heriot chronology
Profound Morality (2022)	Devoured by the Mouth of Hell (2024)

Singles from Devoured by the Mouth of Hell
- 1. "Siege Lord" Released: 2 May 2024; 2. "Foul Void" Released: 5 June 2024; 3. "At the Fortress Gate" Released: 14 August 2024

Devoured by the Mouth of Hell is the debut studio album by British metalcore band Heriot, released on 25 September 2024. Heriot began working on the album in late 2022 and wrote an early version of it in March 2023. In November, following various festival performances throughout the year and three shows supporting Architects, they scrapped most of their material and began reworking it with Sylosis frontman Josh Middleton, whom helped the band with their performances, sonic experimentation, and songwriting. Around this time, the band signed to Century Media Records. Heriot recorded the album in February 2024, with Middleton and bassist and vocalist Jake Packer handling production together; Justin Hill of Sikth engineered the album's drum tracks, whilst Will Putney of Fit for an Autopsy and End mixed and mastered it.

Featuring a heavy, atmospheric and claustrophobic sound that combines heavy and melodic elements, Heriot intended Devoured by the Mouth of Hell to expand on the sound and experimentation of their previous release Profound Morality (2022). Lyrically, its songs are themed around the concept of hell and how it fits into one's life. Heriot promoted the album with performances at several European festivals in June 2024, before touring with Sylosis and Fit for an Autopsy in November and December that year. The band embarked on a short headlining tour of the United Kingdom in April 2025 and toured North America for the first time supporting Trivium in October and December that year. A deluxe edition featuring the singles "Commander of Pain" and "Master of Deceit" was released on 13 February 2026.

== Background and recording ==
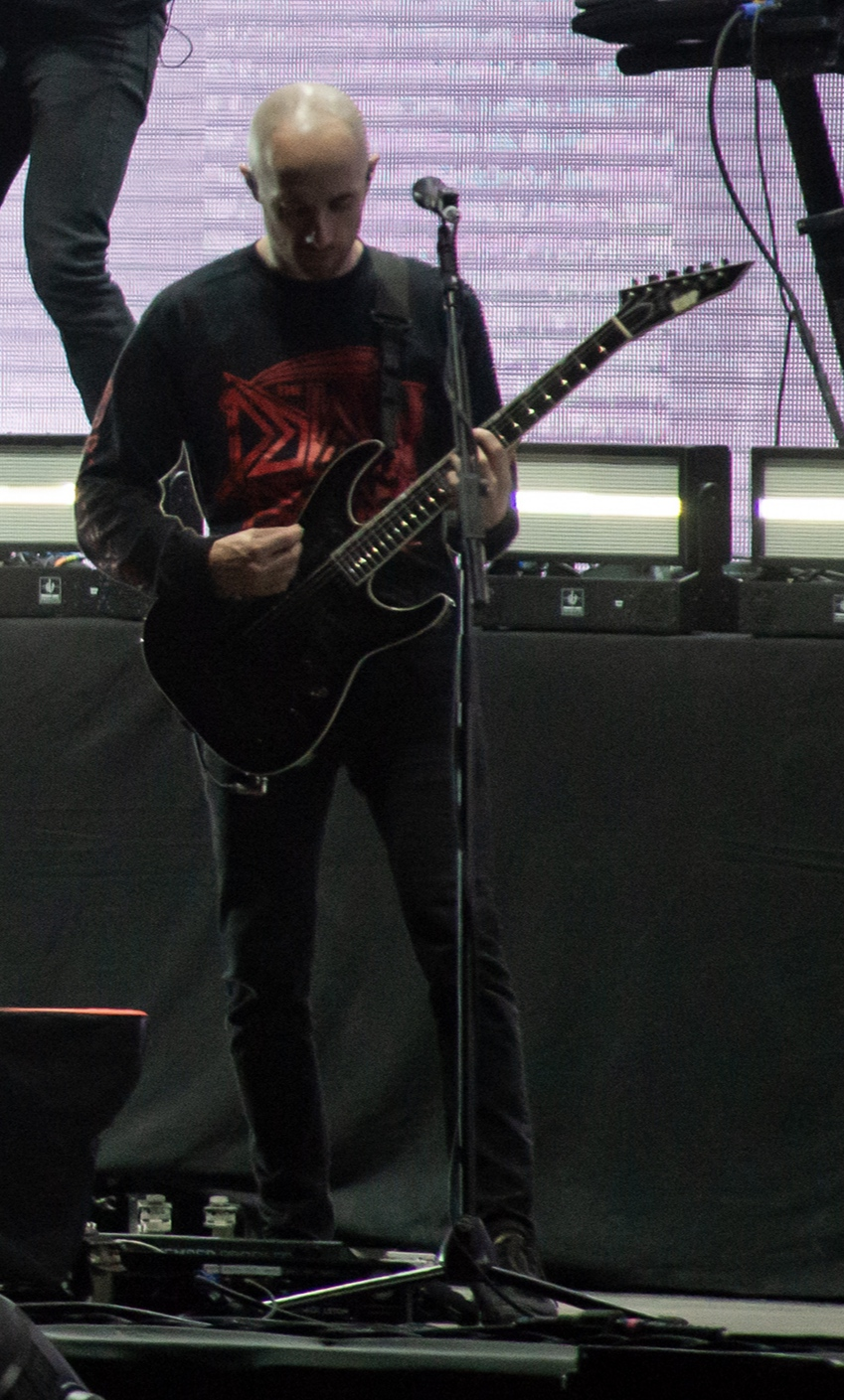
Devoured by the Mouth of Hell was co-produced by Sylosis frontman and former Architects guitarist Josh Middleton (pictured).

In 2022, Heriot released their third extended play, Profound Morality. According to Spencer Hughes of Stereogum, the EP turned Heriot into "one of the [UK's] most hyped heavy exports", and the band's debut album was highly anticipated. (Note: Release hype: Described as anticipated/hyped: Anticipated albums lists:) In late 2022, the band began working on new material. Guitarist Erhan Alman said although Heriot felt pressure to live up to their hype whilst writing the album, it "became secondary to making something that we thought was wicked." According to guitarist and vocalist Debbie Gough, Heriot tried to use the EP's success as "a positive source of encouragement rather than something to worry over". In February 2023, the band released the non-album single "Demure", which they promoted as the start of a "new era".

In March 2023, Heriot wrote the "first iteration" of Devoured by the Mouth of Hell and mid-year they toured Europe and performed at various festivals, including 2000trees, Damnation, Slam Dunk and Standon Calling. They also played three supporting dates with Architects in July and August. Through these performances, Heriot learnt audiences unfamiliar with them did not respond well to Profound Morality's material, which Alman attributed to its "janky" arrangements. Drummer Julian Gage said that the band had not considered how their songs would work in live settings when they conceived the EP, amidst the COVID-19 pandemic.

In November 2023, Heriot revisited their material, and subsequently decided to scrap and rework the bulk of it. Within two days, they had written five new songs, one of which was completed. The same month, the band announced they had signed with Century Media Records and released the non-album single "Soul Chasm". In an interview with Stereogum that month, Alman said Heriot had moved away from writing material for themselves, and were now thinking about how their songs would connect with their audience. Near the end of the writing process, Heriot began working with Sylosis frontman and former Architects guitarist Josh Middleton. Heriot sent Middleton a complete demo version of Devoured by the Mouth of Hell, considered his feedback and reworked their material. According to Alman, Heriot mostly accepted Middleton's advice but did not feel pressured whilst working with him. Gough said Middleton emphasized "how we [needed] to have bits to come back to that will stick with people live" during recording, whilst Alman said he told the band to write riffs that would attract the attention of a bystander if they were performing at a festival.

Heriot finished writing for Devoured by the Mouth of Hell in January 2024 and recorded the album in February that year. Middleton and Jake Packer, the band's bassist and vocalist, co-produced the album, whilst Justin Hill of Sikth helped engineer Gage's drum tracks. Recording sessions were held in Reading, Berkshire, and at Crescent Records Studios in Swindon. It was the first time the members of Heriot had worked in a professional recording studio. Gough and Gage, respectively, credited Middleton and Hill with encouraging Heriot to experiment with different sounds and getting the best performances from them. Alman also credited Middleton with improving his playing technique. Packer spent weeks making notes about the album's tracklist, before reaching an agreed "final iteration" with Alman and Gough. In an interview with Rock Sound, Packer said he hoped "people [would] pick up on the sequencing ... When you listen to it, it sounds like a record, and it should be listened to in that order. Each track makes much more sense as part of the record." Will Putney of Fit for an Autopsy and End mixed and mastered the album in March and April 2024. Heriot discussed working with Putney after Gough worked with End on their 2023 single "Thaw". Gough said Heriot were impressed by Putney's early mixes, and that it "really didn't take long on revisions ... because [he] hit the nail on the head from the word go!".

== Composition ==
=== Music ===
"Siege Lord"
"Siege Lord" was the lead single from Devoured by the Mouth of Hell. According to Gough, the song is one of Heriot's first to feature "a proper chorus".

"Lashed"
Featuring an electronic and industrial sound, "Lashed" draws influence from the works of Sophie and Sara Landry. Gage considered the song to be a "natural progression" from Profound Morality's electronic material.

Devoured By the Mouth of Hell is a metalcore album featuring a heavy, atmospheric and claustrophobic sound. James Hickie of Kerrang! considered the album to be "too broad in scope and dense in execution to be easily characterised". The album incorporates elements of industrial music, slowcore, shoegaze, thrash metal, death metal, blackened metal, doom metal and sludge metal. Critics highlighted the album's combination of melody and heavier elements; Dannii Lievers of Metal Hammer UK described the album as a "work of extremes". Gough's vocals alternate between screaming and clean singing, the latter of which is more-prominent here than on Heriot's previous releases, whilst Packer growls. Matt Young of The Line of Best Fit highlighted the "dual vocal dynamic" between both members as "a key feature of Heriot's sound, giving their music an unsettling, multifaceted edge".

Heriot intended Devoured By the Mouth of Hell to expand on the sound and experimentation of Profound Morality. The band cited artists including Billie Eilish, Korn, Slayer, Slipknot, and Sophie as influences on the album's sound and direction. Gough cited Wand, specifically their second album Golem (2015), as a "huge source of inspiration in aiming to capture depth within our clean sections". Packer cited industrial artists including Justin Broadrick, Scorn, Kahn & Neek, and Kevin Martin (a.k.a. The Bug) as influences on the album's post-production and atmosphere, and the soundtrack to the video game Silent Hill for its ambience.

"Foul Void" and "Siege Lord" rely on heavy riffing; the former song was influenced by 1990s-and-2000s-era metalcore, and was considered by Gough and Packer to be a "blueprint" for the album's direction. "Harm Sequence" and "Sentenced to the Blade" include guitar solos Stereogum considered reminiscent of the works of Dimebag Darrell. On "Opaline" and "Visage", Heriot expand on their shoegaze and electronica influences; both songs also contain elements of ambient music and progressive rock. "Lashed" drew influence from the works of Sophie and Sara Landry, and was considered by Gage to be a "natural progression" from Profound Morality's electronic material.

=== Lyrics ===
Packer and Gough worked together on the lyrics for Devoured By the Mouth of Hell. According to Young, the lyrics explore "themes of existential despair, societal decay, and personal torment". They also incorporate medieval motifs of Packer's influence. According to Gough, the album's tracks revolve around the concept of hell and the ways it applies to one's life. In an interview with Dork, Gough said the phrase "mouth of hell" in the album's title is intended to represent the "overarching idea of being completely consumed by something", though it can also relate to "everyday living, existentialism, poverty, class, [and] internal grief". The lyrics were deliberately vague to allow listeners to form their own views and interpretations. In an interview with PowerMetal.de, Gough also said:

"Hell" is a very interpretable concept. For us, hell is everyday life and scenarios, real places that exist in this world. It's easy to imagine it as an underworld of fire and pain, but I think we see that in our lives and everyone faces a version of it in some form. I think that's a much more terrifying depiction.

"Foul Void" is about inner conflict and uncertainties about faith. "Opaline" concerns "the need to accept that sometimes you must sit with the truth alone, however isolating it may be, until others are ready to understand it". "Siege Lord" is about "the fragility of soul searching"; according to Gough, the song is one of Heriot's first to feature "a proper chorus". Gough said "Solvent Gaze" was intended to be an instrumental track and was named after its sonic and visual feel, with " 'Solvent' stand[ing] for harmful and 'Gaze' for the twisted view that the harmful created". "At the Fortress Gate" is about feeling powerless whilst fighting against a regime and "reflecting on the immense suffering endured by humanity". According to Young, "Mourn" presents "a picture of suffocating inevitability".

== Release and promotion ==
On 2 May 2024, Heriot released "Siege Lord" as the lead single from Devoured by the Mouth of Hell. On 5 June 2024, the band announced the album and released its second single, "Foul Void". Throughout June 2024, Heriot performed at festivals across Europe. After performing at the Rock am Ring and Rock im Park festivals in Germany, the band returned to the UK to perform on the Opus stage of Download Festival, although their set was truncated due to technical issues. At the end of the month, they played at Resurrection Fest in Spain, Jera on Air in the Netherlands, and Hellfest in France. In July, they also performed at the inaugural Bastard Fest in Sheffield, England. On 14 August 2024, the band released "At the Fortress Gate" as the album's third single.

Heriot filmed music videos for their singles with director and visual collaborator Harry Steel. The video for "Siege Lord" was filmed at the Historic Dockyard in Chatham, Kent; because it was the band's first video to be filmed with a budget instead of being self-financed, Gough said that Heriot "wanted to find somewhere that was already a great looking space to really signify the step up for us as a band". The video for "Foul Void" was filmed inside a former-college-turned-property guardianship where Gough lived near Walsall, where Heriot spent six weeks working on Devoured by the Mouth of Hell. The video for "At the Fortress Gate" was filmed during the band's 2024 European festival shows.

Devoured by the Mouth of Hell was first released on compact disc (CD) in Japan by Avalon on 25 September 2024; Century Media released the album worldwide on 27 September 2024. On the day of the album's worldwide release, Heriot released a music video for "Opaline" and performed an "Album Release Show" at The Exchange in Bristol, where they were supported by Cauldron, Urine Mask and Plague Pit. Between 22 November and 21 December 2024, Heriot supported Sylosis and Fit for an Autopsy on their co-headlining tour of Europe. In April 2025, Heriot embarked on a short headlining tour of the United Kingdom, supported by Grove Street and False Reality. Thereafter, the band performed at the 2000trees festival in July and on the main stage of Bloodstock Open Air in August. After previously expressing interest in touring the region, it was announced on 17 June 2025 that Heriot would be touring across North America as support for Trivium between 31 October and 14 December.

On 13 February 2026, Heriot released a deluxe edition of Devoured by the Mouth of Hell, featuring the singles "Commander of Pain" and "Master of Deceit", which the band wrote in July 2025 and recorded in September that year. Both songs were produced by Loathe guitarist Erik Bickerstaffe, and mixed and mastered by Randy LeBoeuf.

== Critical reception ==
Professional ratings
Review scores
Source	Rating
Distorted Sound	9/10
Kerrang!	5/5
The Line of Best Fit	8/10
Metal.de	6/10
Metal Hammer Germany	4.5/7
Metal Hammer UK	4/5 stars
Rock Hard	6.5/10

James Christopher Monger of AllMusic called Devoured by the Mouth of Hell an "assured and diverse" debut. Nick Ruskell of Kerrang! called it a "perfect document of [Heriot's] powers" and praised the band's improved songwriting and atmospherics. Stereogum praised the album as "a bravura display that cements [Heriot] as one of the best young bands in their field". Ox-Fanzine's Anton Kostudis highlighted its "incredibly exciting" mix of styles, and Gough's and Packer's vocal performances. Young of The Line of Best Fit praised Heriot's "willingness to experiment with structure and texture", and the album's lyrics, stating their "ability to weave philosophical depth into their sonic chaos gives the album a sense of weight that extends beyond its sheer brutality".

According to Andrew Sacher of BrooklynVegan, the album successfully balances melody and brutality without compromise; he also highlighted the vocal performances of Packer and Gough. Dannii Lievers of Metal Hammer UK considered the album the "confident work of a far more experienced band" and praised Heriot for "seamlessly sewing together textures and tones and creating full tracks from surprising influences" without being "disjointed". Conversely, Metal.de's reviewer Patrick Olbrich said the album lacks cohesion between its combination of elements. Annika Eichstädt of Metal Hammer Germany felt that the various elements of Heriot's sound did not "[seem] too out of place" and suggested listeners should decide whether to agree with the album's "experimental" classification after listening to "Foul Void". Rock Hard's Ronny Bittner felt that Devoured by the Mouth of Hell's "best moments" mixed Gough's clean vocals and ambient sounds but that its "arrangements often become too arbitrary, causing the songs to drift aimlessly".

Metal Hammer UK rated Devoured by the Mouth of Hell as the second-best metalcore album of 2024, and that year's seventh-best album overall. Kerrang! ranked the album at number fourteen on its list of the 50 best albums of 2024. NME also listed it as one of the year's 20-best debut albums. Heriot and Devoured by the Mouth of Hell were nominated in the "Best UK Artist" and "Best Album" categories at the Heavy Music Awards 2025, but won neither award.

== Track listing ==
All tracks are written by Heriot.

Standard release
No.	Title	Length
1.	"Foul Void"	4:07
2.	"Harm Sequence"	1:49
3.	"Opaline"	3:21
4.	"Siege Lord"	3:25
5.	"Sentenced to the Blade"	2:45
6.	"Solvent Gaze"	2:56
7.	"Lashed"	3:30
8.	"At the Fortress Gate"	3:46
9.	"Visage"	3:44
10.	"Mourn"	4:35
Total length:		33:58

Deluxe edition
No.	Title	Length
11.	"Commander of Pain"	4:45
12.	"Master of Deceit"	4:00
Total length:		42:44

== Personnel ==
Adapted from liner notes and Tidal.

Heriot
- Erhan Alman – guitar
- Debbie Gough – guitar, vocals
- Jake Packer – bass, vocals
- Julian Gage – drums
Production
- Jake Packer – production (1–10)
- Josh Middleton – production, engineering (1–10)
- Erik Bickerstaffe – production, engineering (11–12)
- Will Putney – mixing, mastering (1–10)
- Randy LeBoeuf – mixing, mastering (11–12)
- Justin Hill – engineering (drums) (1–10)

Artwork

- Harry Steel – photography
- Reece Thomas – artwork
- Ross Rickers – layout

== Charts ==
Chart performance for Devoured by the Mouth of Hell
Chart (2024)	Peak position
UK Album Downloads (Official Charts)	62
UK Rock & Metal Albums (Official Charts)	25

== Release history ==
Release history and formats for Devoured by the Mouth of Hell
Region	Date	Format	Label	Catalog #	Ref.
Japan	25 September 2024	CD	Avalon	MICP-11918	
Various	27 September 2024	CD; CS; LP; DD	Century Media	19802804692	
