= Heriot (band) =

British metalcore band

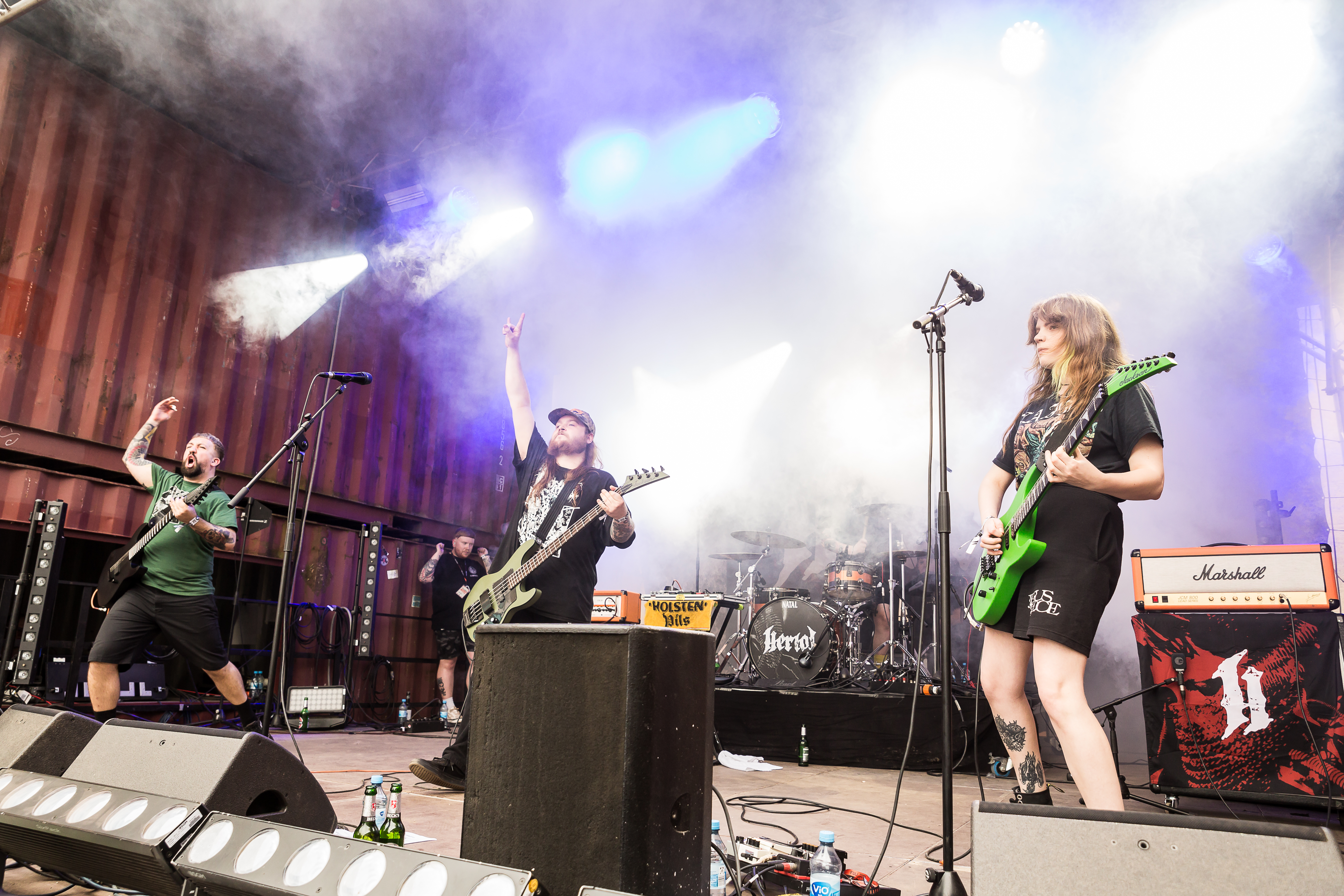
- Heriot performing at the 2023 Full Force festival in Ferropolis, Germany. From left to right: Erhan Alman, Jake Packer, Julian Gage and Debbie Gough.

Background information
- Origin: Swindon, England
- Genres: Metalcore
- Works: Heriot discography
- Years active: 2014–present
- Labels: Slowgod; Church Road; Century Media
- Members: Erhan Alman; Debbie Gough; Jake Packer; Julian Gage
- Website: heriotmetal.com

Heriot are a British metalcore band. The band was formed in Swindon in 2014 by guitarist Erhan Alman, bassist and vocalist Jake Packer and drummer Julian Gage; in 2019, guitarist and vocalist Debbie Gough joined the band. They released their debut album, Devoured by the Mouth of Hell, through Century Media Records on 25 September 2024.

== History ==
=== 2014–2022: Formation and early releases ===
Heriot were originally formed in late 2014 by guitarist Erhan Alman, bassist and vocalist Jake Packer and drummer Julian Gage. All three members met at the same school in Swindon, and discussed forming the band whilst attending the 2000trees festival. Their name, coined by Packer, refers to the Anglo-Saxon-era death duty tax. The band self-released their debut EP, Violence, in January 2015. Heriot gained some notability with their second EP World Collapse, released on 28 October 2016, and from their performance on the New Blood stage at the 2016 Bloodstock Festival. Packer moved to Bristol to attend university at the end of 2016, forcing Heriot into an indefinite hiatus and hurting the band's momentum. The band still occasionally performed shows in 2017 and 2018.

In 2019, Heriot added vocalist and guitarist Debbie Gough (of the Birmingham-based Dead Hands) to their line-up. The addition of Gough caused a shift in the band's writing and dynamic; by the end of the COVID-19 pandemic, they had emerged a completely different-souding band. Heriot's debut single with Gough, "Cleansed Existence", was released on 26 November 2020. Gage said that the band "relaunched" themselves with the single's release: "We [Heriot] see that as a fresh start: the only thing that really stayed is the name". By 2022, Heriot had disowned their early output and removed it from streaming services, although they continued to play the title track from Violence until 2023, as the band did not have enough songs for their setlist at the time.

In February 2021, Heriot were contacted by Church Road Records, with the band announcing their signing to the label in April of that year. On 29 April 2022 Heriot released their third EP, Profound Morality. The band decided against releasing a proper album at the time as they still wanted the freedom to experiment with their sound. According to Stereogum, the EP took the band "from an anonymous part of the glut of metal bands populating UK scenes [...], to one of the country’s most hyped heavy exports." The band's tours in support of the EP were larger than any they had done prior to the COVID-19 pandemic; they performed at several festivals including 2000trees, ArcTanGent, Bloodstock and Download, and embarked on supporting tours in the United Kingdom with Svalbard, Rolo Tomassi, Pupil Slicer, Zeal & Ardor and Boston Manor. According to Metal Hammer, Heriot's touring achievements during 2022 allowed them to "[emerge] confidently as the breakthrough band of the year." In January 2023, the band were featured on NME's "NME 100" list for "essential emerging artists".

=== 2023–present: Devoured by the Mouth of Hell ===
On 14 February 2023, at the tail end of a supporting tour with Rolo Tomassi, Heriot released a new single, "Demure", which they said marked the start of a "new era" for the band. They began writing material for their debut album in March 2023, though work was put on hold to allow the band to tour across Europe during the summer. During that time, they performed at the 2023 editions of the 2000trees, Slam Dunk and Standon Calling festivals.

On 15 November 2023, Heriot released "Soul Chasm", their first single since signing with Century Media Records. On 2 May 2024, they released another single, "Siege Lord". On 5 June 2024, the band announced the release of their debut album, Devoured by the Mouth of Hell, and released "Foul Void" as its second single. The band recorded the album with Sylosis frontman and ex-Architects guitarist Josh Middleton and Will Putney. Throughout June 2024, Heriot performed at the Rock im Park and Rock Am Ring, Download, Resurrection, Jera on Air and Hellfest festivals. In November and December 2024 they supported Sylosis and Fit for an Autopsy on their co-headlining tour of Europe. In April 2025, Heriot embarked on a short headlining tour of the United Kingdom, supported by Grove Street and False Reality. The band toured North America for the first time supporting Trivium between 31 October and 14 December.

== Style and influences ==
Heriot are often described as a metalcore band. Guitar.com described the band as "genre-agnostic", whilst Blabbermouth.net described their Profound Morality EP as "post-everything". The band's sound has been described as featuring and combining elements from a wide variety of metal subgenres, including blackened metal, death metal, gothic metal, doom metal, industrial metal, sludge metal and post-metal, as well as those from non-metal genres including post-rock, hardcore, industrial, noise and ambient music. (Note: Musical styles: "blackened metal": "death metal": "doom metal": "gothic metal": "industrial metal": "sludge metal": "post-metal": "post-rock": "hardcore": "industrial"/"noise": "ambient":) The band's early sound was described as sludge metal, hardcore, and "doomcore".

The band's musical influences include '68, Banks, Billie Eillish, Black Sabbath, Brutus, Cancer Bats, the Chariot, Code Orange, Converge, Deftones, the Dillinger Escape Plan, Employed to Serve, Godflesh, Health, Holding Absence, Knocked Loose, Korn, Kublai Khan, Lamb of God, Loathe, Marmozets, My Ticket Home, Nails, Oathbreaker, Ocean Grove, Power Trip, Primitive Man, Sleep Token, Slipknot, Sophie, Thrown, Tonight Alive, Vein.fm, Wand and Whitechapel.

Gough has said that Heriot is "a very visual band and we work very hard to cement our music as an immersive experience." The band incorporates medieval motifs into their artwork and videos; the cover of Profound Morality features a chainmail cap, and the music videos for its singles also feature medieval elements. Heriot has frequently collaborated with Harry Steel on their videos and artwork; they have called him the band's "unofficial 5th member".

== Band members ==
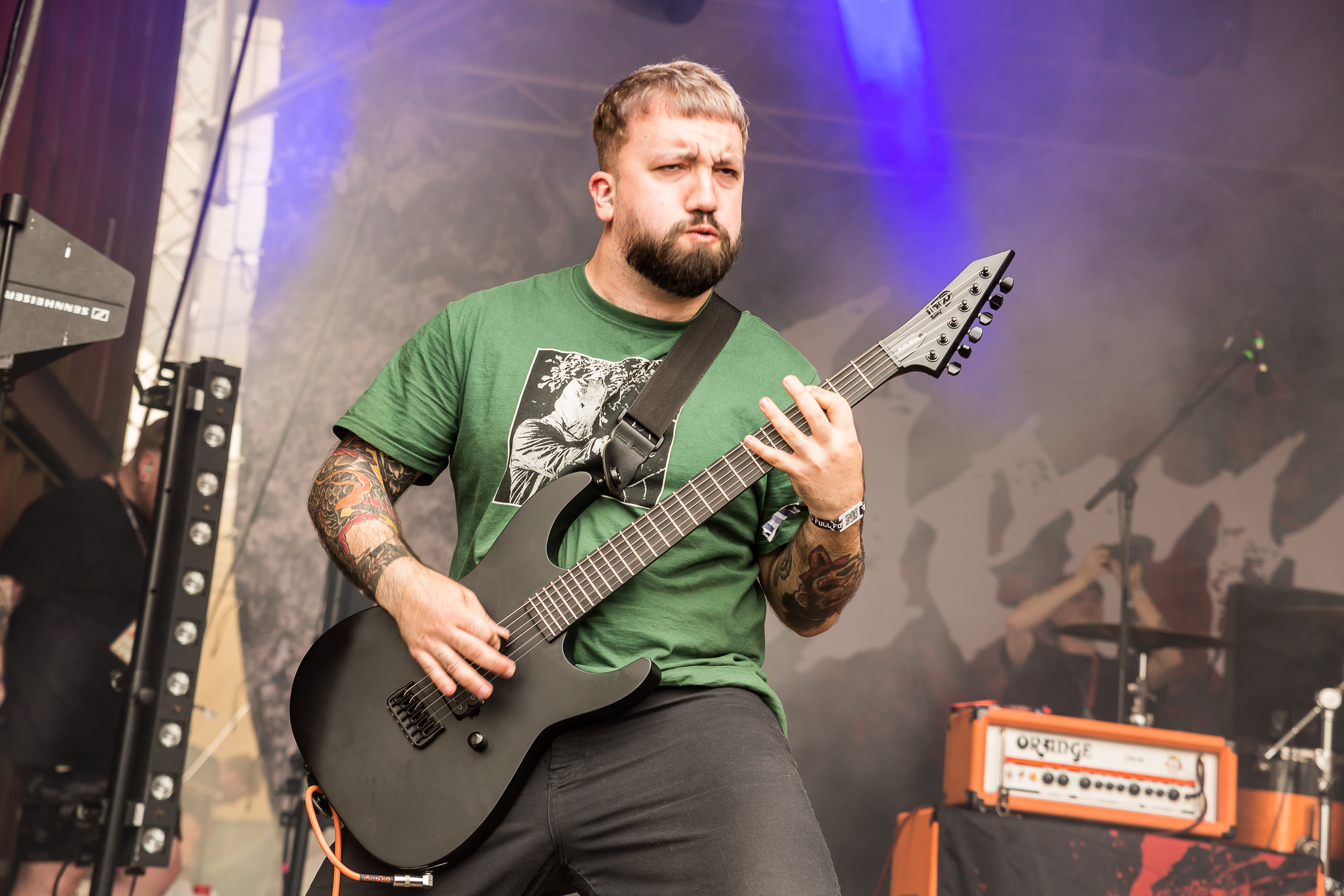
Erhan Alman

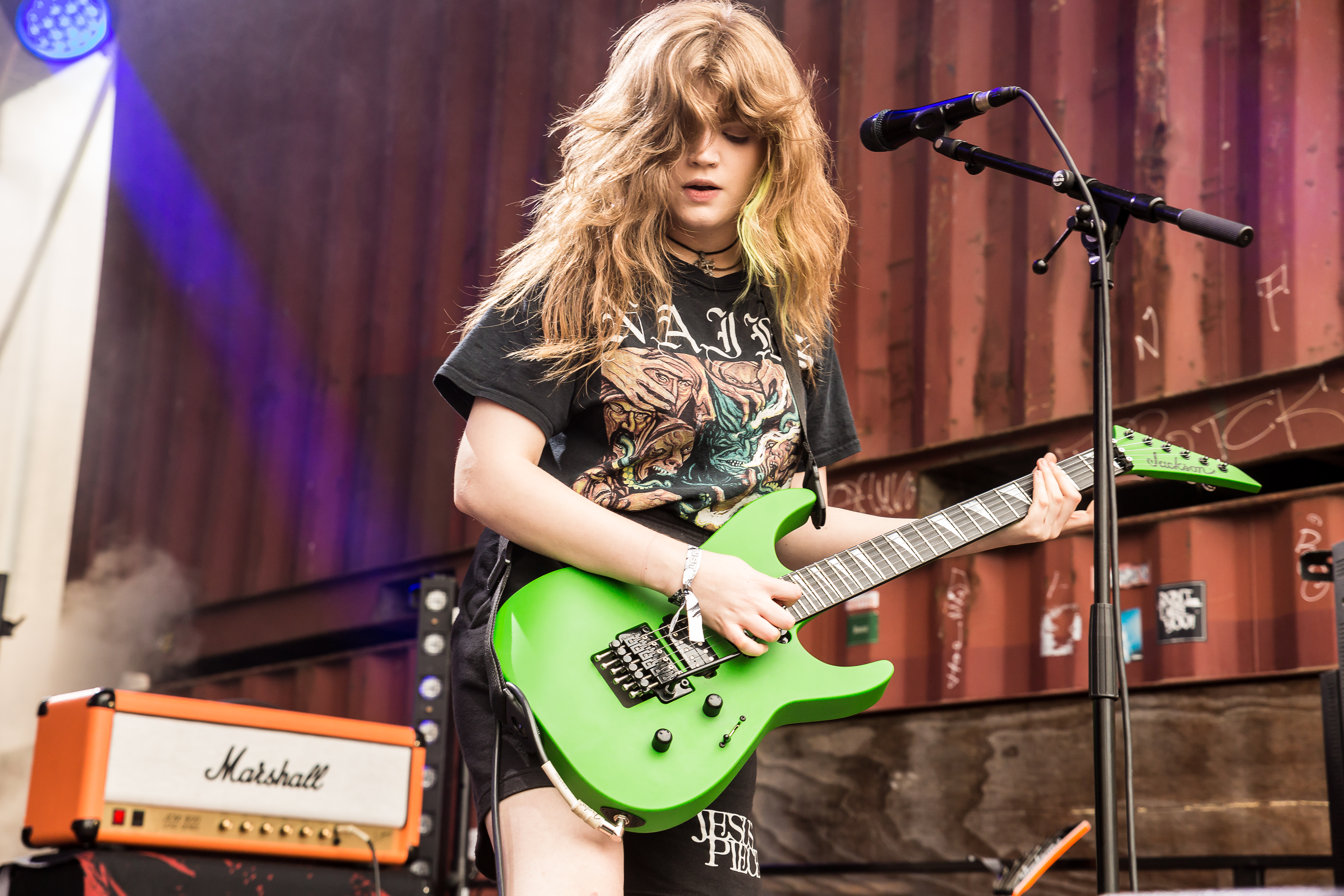
Debbie Gough

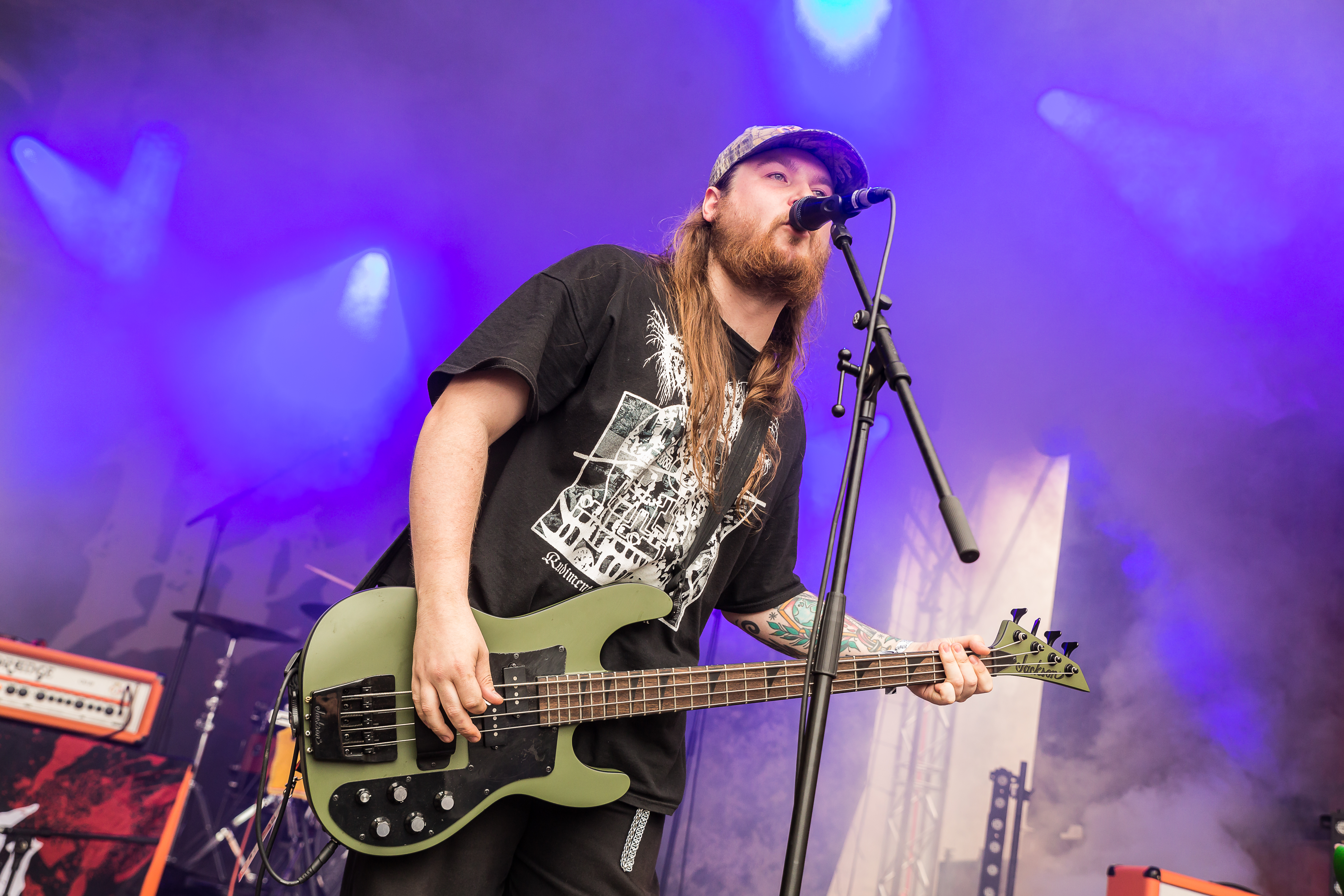
Jake Packer

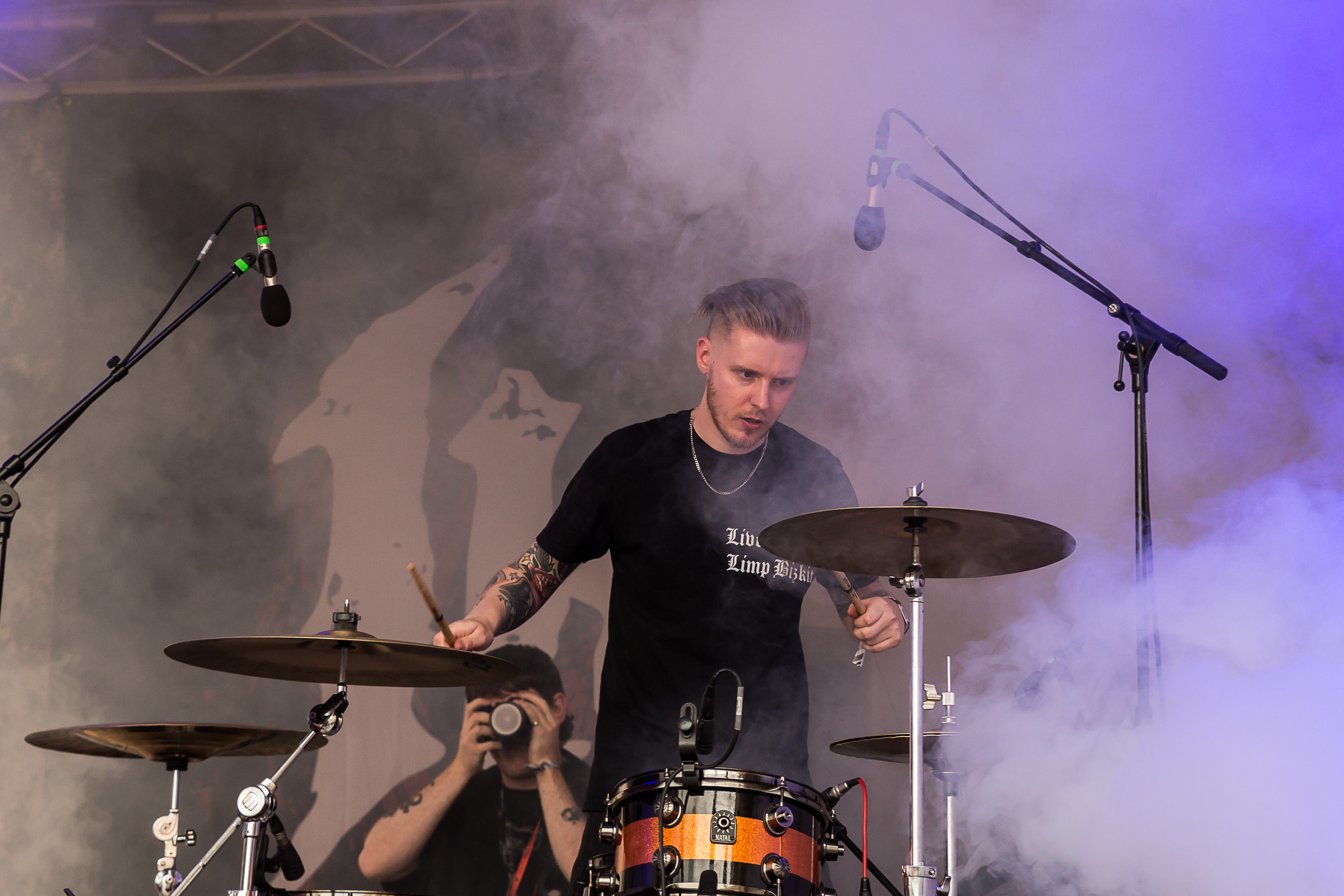
Julian Gage
- Erhan Alman – guitar (2014–present)
- Debbie Gough – guitar, vocals (2019–present)
- Jake Packer – bass, vocals (2014–present)
- Julian Gage – drums (2014–present)

== Awards and nominations ==
Kerrang! Awards
Year	Nominee / work	Award	Result	Ref.
2022	Themselves	New Noise Award	Nominated	

Heavy Music Awards
Year	Nominee / work	Award	Result	Ref.
2022	Themselves	Best UK Breakthrough Band	Nominated	
2023	Profound Morality	Best Breakthrough Album	Nominated	
2023	Themselves	Best Breakthrough Live Artist	Nominated	
2025	Devoured by the Mouth of Hell	Best Album	Nominated	
2025	Themselves	Best UK Artist	Nominated	

== Discography ==
Studio albums

- Devoured by the Mouth of Hell (2024)
