= Cycle of Suffering =

Studio album by Sylosis
- Released: 7 February 2020
- Genre: Thrash metal; progressive metal; melodic death metal; metalcore
- Length: 50:52
- Label: Nuclear Blast
- Producer: Josh Middleton

Sylosis chronology
Dormant Heart (2015)	Cycle of Suffering (2020)	A Sign of Things to Come (2023)

Singles from Cycle of Suffering
- 1. "I Sever" Released: 6 December 2019; 2. "Calcified" Released: 10 January 2020

Professional ratings
Review scores
Source	Rating
Blabbermouth.net	8.5/10
Kerrang	4/5 stars
Metal Hammer	6/7 stars

Cycle of Suffering is the fifth studio album by British heavy metal band Sylosis, released on 7 February 2020 through Nuclear Blast. It is the band's first studio album since their hiatus in 2016, as well as their first to feature Conor Marshall on bass (before switching to rhythm guitar in 2024), and drummer Ali Richardson, replacing Carl Parnell and Rob Callard.

A music video for the song "I Sever", the first single from Cycle of Suffering, was released for streaming on 6 December 2019.

The band is mostly playing in D standard tuning on Cycle of Suffering for the first time since the EPs Casting Shadows and The Supreme Oppressor, instead of E standard tuning on their previous full-length albums, though "Idle Hands" is tuned down to D-flat, their main tuning from their next album A Sign of Things to Come onwards.

== Track listing ==
All tracks are written by Josh Middleton.

No.	Title	Length
1.	"Empty Prophets"	3:03
2.	"I Sever"	5:08
3.	"Cycle of Suffering"	3:32
4.	"Shield"	3:51
5.	"Calcified"	3:55
6.	"Invidia"	4:52
7.	"Idle Hands"	4:40
8.	"Apex of Disdain"	4:26
9.	"Arms Like a Noose"	3:46
10.	"Devils in Their Eyes"	3:26
11.	"Disintegrate"	4:07
12.	"Abandon"	6:06
Total length:		50:52

== Personnel ==
=== Sylosis ===
- Josh Middleton – lead guitar, vocals
- Alex Bailey – rhythm guitar
- Conor Marshall – bass
- Ali Richardson – drums

=== Additional personnel ===
- Josh Middleton – production, mixing, cover art* Ermin Hamidovic – mastering, additional mixing
- Dan Goldsworthy – layout, design

== Charts ==
Sales chart performance for Cycle of Suffering
Chart (2020)	Peak position
German Albums (Offizielle Top 100)	93
Scottish Albums (Official Charts)	28

== See also ==
- List of 2020 albums
