= Edge of the Earth (album) =

Studio album by Sylosis
- Released: 11 March 2011
- Recorded: 2010
- Studio: Grindstone Studios, Reading, England
- Genre: Thrash metal; melodic death metal; progressive metal
- Length: 72:15
- Label: Nuclear Blast
- Producer: Scott Atkins

Sylosis chronology
Conclusion of an Age (2008)	Edge of the Earth (2011)	Monolith (2011)

Professional ratings
Review scores
Source	Rating
Big Cheese	5/5 stars
Blistering.com	8/10 stars
Metal Assault	8/10 stars
Rock Sound	8/10 stars
Thrash Hits	4/5 stars
AllMusic	4/5 stars

Edge of the Earth is the second studio album by British heavy metal band Sylosis, released on 11 March 2011. It is the first release to feature lead guitarist Josh Middleton performing vocals, replacing former lead vocalist Jamie Graham and also first release to feature then-new rhythm guitarist, Alex Bailey. The band released a single, "Empyreal (Part 1)", in January 2011.

== Track listing ==
No.	Title	Length
1.	"Procession"	6:45
2.	"Sands of Time"	5:07
3.	"Empyreal (Part 1)"	4:52
4.	"Empyreal (Part 2)" (Instrumental)	1:07
5.	"A Serpents Tongue"	5:23
6.	"Awakening"	3:59
7.	"Kingdom of Solitude"	5:37
8.	"Where the Sky Ends" (Instrumental)	3:56
9.	"Dystopia"	5:44
10.	"Apparitions"	7:15
11.	"Altered States of Consciousness"	5:31
12.	"Beyond the Resurrected"	5:10
13.	"Eclipsed"	4:46
14.	"From the Edge of the Earth"	7:38

iTunes bonus track
No.	Title	Length
15.	"Earth's Dust"	4:47

== Personnel ==
Sylosis

- Josh Middleton – lead guitar, lead vocals
- Alex Bailey – rhythm guitar
- Carl Parnell – bass
- Rob Callard – drums, percussion

Production and design

- Scott Atkins – producer, engineering, mixing
- Dan Goldsworthy – artwork
