= Conclusion of an Age =

Studio album by Sylosis
- Released: 24 October 2008
- Recorded: 2008
- Studios: Grindstone Studios, Reading, England
- Genres: Thrash metal, melodic death metal
- Length: 59:11
- Label: Nuclear Blast
- Producer: Scott Atkins

Sylosis chronology
The Supreme Oppressor (2007)	Conclusion of an Age (2008)	Edge of the Earth (2011)

Professional ratings
Review scores
Source	Rating
AllMusic	2.5/5 stars
Blabbermouth.net	8/10
Kerrang!	4/5 stars
Play.com	5/5 stars
Rock Sound	8/10 stars

Conclusion of an Age is the debut studio album by British heavy metal band Sylosis. The album was released on 24 October 2008 and was produced and recorded by Scott Atkins at Grindstone Studios. It was also the last release by the band to feature Jamie Graham on vocals.

Although it is not strictly a concept album, there is a theme running throughout the album that relates to the collapse of human civilization and the return of the Earth to its natural state. The band stated in a press release that the album's lyrical theme deals with "the direction in which the planet is heading and the consequences humanity will face. The album covers many areas, but the main concept is the idea of mankind destroying itself through war, self-indulgence, religion etc. and how the earth is being ravaged by humanity to the point of being destroyed... but how the Earth's might will eventually prevail!"

On March 8, 2021, Sylosis announced a vinyl release of Conclusion of an Age and released "Plight of the Soul", a previously unreleased B-side track from the album.

== Track listing ==
No.	Title	Length
1.	"Desolate Seas" (Instrumental)	1:06
2.	"After Lifeless Years"	4:57
3.	"The Blackest Skyline"	4:56
4.	"Transcendence"	4:28
5.	"Reflections Through Fire"	4:30
6.	"Conclusion of an Age"	5:40
7.	"Swallow the World"	5:56
8.	"Teras"	5:20
9.	"Withered"	4:39
10.	"Last Remaining Light"	7:39
11.	"Stained Humanity"	4:30
12.	"Oath of Silence"	5:30

iTunes bonus track
No.	Title	Length
13.	"The Fate of Vultures"	5:12

2021 reissue bonus track
No.	Title	Length
14.	"Plight of the Soul"	3:41

== Personnel ==
- Jamie Graham – vocals
- Josh Middleton – lead guitar, piano
- Carl Parnell – bass
- Rob Callard – drums, percussion

Guest musicians

- Alex Bailey – additional rhythm guitar
- Adam Frakes-Sime – backing vocals (track 5)
- Chris O'Toole – guitar solo (track 10)
