= Shrine (album) =

Studio album by Bleed from Within
- Released: 3 June 2022
- Recorded: 2021
- Studio: Middle Farm Studios (South Devon, England); BFW Headquarter (Glasgow, Scotland); Real World Studios (Wiltshire, England)
- Genre: Metalcore, groove metal, melodic death metal
- Length: 47:47
- Label: Nuclear Blast
- Producer: Jamie Finch

Bleed from Within chronology
Fracture (2020)	Shrine (2022)	Zenith (2025)

Professional ratings
Review scores
Source	Rating
Boolin Tunes	8.5/10
Distorted Sound	8/10
Ghost Cult Magazine	8/10
Metal Hammer	3.5/5 stars
Metal Injection	8/10

Shrine is the sixth studio album by Scottish metalcore band Bleed from Within. It was released on 3 June 2022 through Nuclear Blast. The single "Levitate" was released in advance on 4 March 2022.

== Track listing ==
All tracks are written by Bleed from Within.

Shrine track listing
No.	Title	Length
1.	"I Am Damnation"	4:42
2.	"Sovereign"	3:35
3.	"Levitate"	4:30
4.	"Flesh and Stone"	4:10
5.	"Invisible Enemy"	4:02
6.	"Skye"	0:52
7.	"Stand Down"	4:03
8.	"Death Defined"	4:03
9.	"Shapeshifter"	4:30
10.	"Temple of Lunacy"	4:27
11.	"Killing Time"	4:22
12.	"Paradise"	4:31
Total length:		47:47

Bonus Tracks
No.	Title	Length
13.	"The Will To Resist"	3:36
14.	"Overthrone"	3:38
15.	"Chemical Carnival"	3:40
Total length:		58:41

== Personnel ==
Bleed from Within

- Scott Kennedy – unclean vocals
- Steven Jones – rhythm guitar, clean vocals
- Craig "Goonzi" Gowans – lead guitar
- Davie Provan – bass
- Ali Richardson – drums, percussion

Production and design

- Jamie Finch – production
- Adam "Nolly" Getgood – engineering (drums), mixing
- Steven Jones – engineering (guitars, vocals)
- Mike Kalajian – mastering
- Davie Provan – artwork
- Simon A Visuals – layout

== Charts ==
Chart performance for Shrine
Chart (2022)	Peak position
German Albums (Offizielle Top 100)	85
Swiss Albums (Schweizer Hitparade)	40
