= Uprising (Bleed from Within album) =

Studio album by Bleed from Within
- Released: 25 March 2013
- Recorded: July – November 2012
- Studio: Monnow Valley Studios in Rockfield, Wales
- Genre: Metalcore, groove metal, melodic death metal, deathcore
- Length: 50:16
- Label: Century Media
- Producer: Bleed from Within, Romesh Dodangoda, Adam Getgood, Martyn Ford

Bleed from Within chronology
| Empire (2010) | Uprising (2013) | Era (2018) |

Professional ratings
Review scores
| Source | Rating |
|---|---|
| Metal Hammer | 4.5/5 stars |

Uprising is the third studio album by Scottish metalcore band Bleed from Within, released on 25 March 2013 through Century Media Records. It is the band's first and only record to feature guitarist Martyn Evans, who replaced founding guitarist Dave Lennon in 2011.

== Track listing ==
All lyrics are written by Kennedy and Richardson; all music is composed by Bleed from Within.

| No. | Title | Length |
|---|---|---|
| 1. | "III" | 1:03 |
| 2. | "Colony" | 4:24 |
| 3. | "It Lives in Me" | 4:43 |
| 4. | "Nothing. No One. Nowhere" | 3:41 |
| 5. | "Escape Yourself" | 4:07 |
| 6. | "Strive" | 4:52 |
| 7. | "I Am Oblivion" | 4:29 |
| 8. | "Speechless" (instrumental) | 1:32 |
| 9. | "Our Divide" | 4:30 |
| 10. | "Uprising" | 4:30 |
| 11. | "The War Around Us" (featuring Liam Cormier) | 3:40 |
| 12. | "Leech" | 4:08 |
| 13. | "Devotion" | 4:37 |
| Total length: | | 50:16 |

Limited digipak bonus tracks
| No. | Title | Writer(s) | Length |
|---|---|---|---|
| 14. | "See You in Hell" | | 4:02 |
| 15. | "Blood Brothers" (Papa Roach cover) | Papa Roach | 4:07 |
| Total length: | | | 58:25 |

iTunes Store bonus tracks
| No. | Title | Writer(s) | Length |
|---|---|---|---|
| 14. | "See You in Hell" | | 4:02 |
| 15. | "Blood Brothers" (Papa Roach cover) | Papa Roach | 4:07 |
| 16. | "Let's Play God" | | 5:18 |
| Total length: | | | 63:43 |

== Credits ==
Writing, performance and production credits are adapted from the album liner notes.

=== Personnel ===
==== Bleed from Within ====
- Scott Kennedy – vocals
- Craig "Goonzi" Gowans – guitar
- Martyn Evans – guitar
- Davie Provan – bass
- Ali Richardson – drums

==== Guest musicians ====
- Liam Cormier – vocals on "The War Around Us"

==== Additional musicians ====
- Adam "Nolly" Getgood (Periphery) – guitar solo on "Leech"
- Ben Morgan – backing vocals on "Escape Yourself"

==== Production ====
- Bleed from Within – production
- Romesh Dodangoda – production, drum recording
- Adam "Nolly" Getgood – production, guitar recording
- Martyn "Ginge" Ford – production, vocals recording
- Rob Thomas – engineering (drums only)
- Logan Mader – mixing, mastering

==== Bonus tracks production ====
- Craig "Goonzi" Gowans – production, recording
- Adam "Nolly" Getgood – mixing

==== Artwork and design ====
- Thomas Bates – artwork, layout
- Tom Barnes – photography

=== Studios ===
- Monnow Valley Studios, Monmouth, UK – drum recording
- Getgood Studios, Bath, UK – guitar recording
- Nott-In-Pill Studios, Newport, UK – vocals recording
- 12 Inch Audio – recording (bonus tracks only)

== Charts ==
| Chart | Peak position |
|---|---|
| UK Albums (OCC) | 200 |
| UK Rock & Metal Albums (OCC) | 13 |
