= Monolith (Sylosis album) =

Studio album by Sylosis
- Released: 8 October 2012
- Recorded: 2011–2012
- Studio: Monnow Valley Studio, Wales
- Genre: Thrash metal; melodic death metal; progressive metal
- Length: 71:12
- Label: Nuclear Blast
- Producer: Romesh Dodangoda

Sylosis chronology
Edge of the Earth (2011)	Monolith (2012)	Dormant Heart (2015)

Singles from Monolith
- 1. "Born Anew" Released: 7 August 2012; 2. "A Dying Vine" Released: 7 August 2012

Monolith is the third studio album by British heavy metal band Sylosis. It was released on 5 October 2012, in Europe and 9 October 2012, in North America.

== Background ==
On 31 March 2012, Sylosis released a teaser on YouTube simply entitled Sylosis III which featured clips of the band performing in a studio. Later, it was revealed that Sylosis had indeed started work on their third studio album just over a year after the release of Edge of the Earth. Sylosis continued to tease the release of the new album by posting another video on YouTube, it was revealed in the video that the band were recording the new album at the Monnow Valley Studio in Rockfield, Monmouthshire, Wales.

== Release and promotion ==
On 7 August 2012, Sylosis provided free download of "A Dying Vine" via their website, and their song 'Born Anew' was first played on "Rock Show with Daniel P Carter" on Radio 1. As of 2 October 2012, the album was streamed on MetalSucks in its entirety. As part of the promotion of the album and to celebrate its release, Sylosis played a hometown show in Reading, UK on 7 October where fans could purchase a copy of the album a day prior to its official release as well as perform a few of the songs from the new album live. On 3 December, the music video for "Fear the World" was released.

== Reception ==
Professional ratings
Review scores
Source	Rating
AllMusic	4/5 stars
Blistering	9/10 stars
Kerrang!	4/5 stars
Metal Hammer	8/10 stars
Rock n Reel	4.5/5 stars
Terrorizer	5/5 stars

The album has received very positive reviews from music critics. A review from MetalSucks stated that "A little more than halfway through “Out from Below,” the opening track from Sylosis’ Monolith, the band breaks out what must be one of the best Metallica riffs that Metallica never wrote; then, just twenty seconds later, the band suddenly-but-seamlessly transitions into what might actually be the best Metallica riff that Metallica never wrote. Fans of thrash that feels traditionalist, but not retro, will find themselves completely unable to turn Monolith off from that point forward; the album has now sunk its hooks into your skin like a Cenobite, and you are just going to have to hang there and go with it."

== Track listing ==
All tracks are written by Sylosis

No.	Title	Length
1.	"Out from Below"	6:58
2.	"Fear the World"	5:20
3.	"What Dwells Within"	5:02
4.	"Behind the Sun"	5:01
5.	"The River"	5:33
6.	"Monolith"	5:02
7.	"Paradox"	6:08
8.	"A Dying Vine"	5:56
9.	"All Is Not Well"	4:29
10.	"Born Anew"	3:48
11.	"Enshrined" (includes 10-minute silence from 4:56 to 14:56 and hidden track)	19:16
Total length:		71:12

== Personnel ==
Sylosis

- Josh Middleton – lead guitar, lead vocals, keyboards
- Alex Bailey – rhythm guitar, piano
- Carl Parnell – bass
- Rob Callard – drums, percussion

Production and design

- Romesh Dodangoda – producer, engineering, mixing
- Josh Middleton – co-producer, art concept
- Jens Bogren – mastering
- Dan Goldsworthy – artwork
- Tom Barnes – photography
