= The New Flesh =

Studio album by Sylosis
- Released: 20 February 2026
- Genre: Thrash metal; groove metal; progressive metal; melodic death metal; melodic metalcore
- Length: 47:45
- Label: Nuclear Blast
- Producer: Josh Middleton

Sylosis chronology
A Sign of Things to Come (2023)	The New Flesh (2026)

Singles from The New Flesh
- 1. "The New Flesh" Released: 26 November 2025; 2. "Erased" Released: 7 January 2026; 3. "Lacerations" Released: 4 February 2026; 4. "Spared from the Guillotine" Released: 20 February 2026

Professional ratings
Review scores
Source	Rating
Distorted Sound	8/10
Kerrang!	4/5

The New Flesh is the seventh studio album by British heavy metal band Sylosis, released on 20 February 2026 through Nuclear Blast. It is the first album in which Conor Marshall plays rhythm guitar instead of bass, and the first with bassist Ben Thomas.

Singles and music videos for several tracks were released ahead of the album's premiere; the title track, "Erased", "Lacerations", and "Spared from the Guillotine" (on the day of the album's release).

== Track listing ==
All tracks are written by Josh Middleton.

The New Flesh track listing
No.	Title	Length
1.	"Beneath the Surface"	4:12
2.	"Erased"	4:47
3.	"All Glory, No Valour"	3:13
4.	"Lacerations"	4:51
5.	"Mirror Mirror"	3:38
6.	"Spared from the Guillotine"	3:55
7.	"Adorn My Throne"	4:18
8.	"The New Flesh"	4:05
9.	"Everywhere at Once"	5:26
10.	"Circle of Swords"	3:54
11.	"Seeds in the River"	5:26
Total length:		47:45

== Personnel ==
=== Sylosis ===
- Josh Middleton – lead guitar, vocals
- Conor Marshall – rhythm guitar
- Ben Thomas – bass guitar
- Ali Richardson – drums

=== Additional personnel ===
- Scott Atkins – engineering
- Josh Middleton – production, mixing
- Adam "Nolly" Getgood – mastering
- Snakehed – artwork, layout

== Charts ==
Chart performance for The New Flesh
Chart (2026)	Peak position
Swiss Albums (Schweizer Hitparade)	85
