= Era (Bleed from Within album) =

Studio album by Bleed from Within
- Released: 6 April 2018
- Recorded: 2017
- Studio: Middle Farm Studios (South Devon, England); BFW Headquarter (Glasgow, Scotland)
- Genre: Metalcore, groove metal, melodic death metal
- Length: 46:34
- Label: Century Media
- Producer: Adam Getgood

Bleed from Within chronology
Uprising (2013)	Era (2018)	Fracture (2020)

Professional ratings
Review scores
Source	Rating
Already Heard	4/5
Distorted Sound	8/10
MMH Radio	4/5 stars
Rock Sins	8/10 stars
Soundscape	10/10

Era is the fourth studio album by Scottish metalcore band Bleed from Within, released on 6 April 2018 through Century Media Records. It is the band's first record to feature guitarist Steven "Snev" Jones, who replaced Martyn Evans in 2017.

== Track listing ==
All lyrics are written by Kennedy and Richardson; all music is composed by Bleed from Within.

No.	Title	Length
1.	"Clarity"	4:31
2.	"Crown of Misery"	3:24
3.	"Cast Down"	4:02
4.	"Afterlife"	4:28
5.	"Shiver"	5:07
6.	"Bed of Snakes" (featuring Adam Getgood)	4:15
7.	"I Am Oblivion, Pt. II"	3:58
8.	"Alone in the Sun"	4:16
9.	"Gatekeeper"	3:40
10.	"Ruina"	4:08
11.	"Alive"	4:45
Total length:		46:34

Limited digipak bonus tracks
No.	Title	Length
12.	"State Decay"	4:38
13.	"Drag You to the Ground"	3:48
Total length:		55:00

== Credits ==
=== Personnel ===
==== Bleed from Within ====
- Scott Kennedy – unclean vocals
- Craig Gowans – guitar
- Steven Jones – guitar, clean vocals
- Davie Provan – bass
- Ali Richardson – drums

==== Guest musicians ====
- Adam "Nolly" Getgood (Periphery) – guitar solo on "Bed of Snakes"

==== Production ====
- Adam "Nolly" Getgood – production, drum recording, mixing
- Sebastian Sendon – engineering
- Steven Jones – engineering
- Ermin Hamidović – mastering

==== Artwork and design ====
- Davie Provan – artwork
- Sam Bailey – layout
- Thomas Bates – layout
- David Ruff – photography

=== Studios ===
- Middle Farm Studios, South Devon, UK – drum recording
- BFW Headquarter, Glasgow, Scotland – guitars and vocals recording

== Charts ==
Chart (2018)	Peak position
Scottish Albums (OCC)	42
