= Fracture (Bleed from Within album) =

Studio album by Bleed from Within
- Released: 29 May 2020
- Recorded: August 2019 – January 2020
- Studio: Middle Farm Studios (South Devon, England); BFW Headquarter (Glasgow, Scotland)
- Genre: Metalcore, groove metal, melodic death metal
- Length: 42:10
- Label: Century Media
- Producer: Bleed from Within

Bleed from Within chronology
Era (2018)	Fracture (2020)	Shrine (2022)

Professional ratings
Review scores
Source	Rating
Kerrang!	4/5 stars
Metal Hammer	4/5 stars

Fracture is the fifth studio album by Scottish metalcore band Bleed from Within. It was released on 29 May 2020 through Century Media Records. Metal Hammer named it as the 40th best metal album of 2020.

== Track listing ==
All tracks are written by Bleed from Within.

Fracture track listing
No.	Title	Length
1.	"The End of All We Know"	4:12
2.	"Pathfinder"	4:19
3.	"Into Nothing"	4:42
4.	"Fall Away"	3:30
5.	"Fracture"	3:52
6.	"Night Crossing"	4:03
7.	"For All to See"	4:29
8.	"Ascend"	4:10
9.	"Utopia"	4:39
10.	"A Depth That No One Dares"	4:14
Total length:		42:10

== Personnel ==
Bleed from Within

- Scott Kennedy – unclean vocals
- Ali Richardson – drums, percussion
- Craig "Goonzi" Gowans – lead guitar
- Davie Provan – bass
- Steven Jones – rhythm guitar, clean vocals

Additional musician

- Matt Heafy – guitar solo (track 6)

Production and design

- Bleed from Within – production
- Adam "Nolly" Getgood – engineering (drums), mixing
- Steven Jones – engineering (guitars, vocals)
- Ermin Hamidovic – mastering
- Davie Provan – artwork
- Simon A Visuals – layout

== Charts ==
Chart performance for Fracture
Chart (2020)	Peak position
German Albums (Offizielle Top 100)	61
Scottish Albums (OCC)	6
Swiss Albums (Schweizer Hitparade)	35
