= A Sign of Things to Come =

Studio album by Sylosis
- Released: 8 September 2023
- Genres: Thrash metal, melodic death metal, metalcore, progressive metal
- Length: 43:15
- Label: Nuclear Blast
- Producers: Josh Middleton; Scott Atkins

Sylosis chronology
Cycle of Suffering (2020)	A Sign of Things to Come (2023)	The New Flesh (2026)

Singles from A Sign of Things to Come
- 1. "Deadwood" Released: 16 March 2023; 2. "Poison for the Lost" Released: 1 June 2023; 3. "A Sign of Things to Come" Released: 20 July 2023; 4. "Descent" Released: 9 September 2023

Professional ratings
Review scores
Source	Rating
Distorted Sound	9/10
Kerrang!	4/5
Loud and Proud	55/100

A Sign of Things to Come is the sixth studio album by British heavy metal band Sylosis, released on 8 September 2023 through Nuclear Blast. It was the last to feature rhythm guitarist Alex Bailey before his departure in 2024.

Singles and music videos for several tracks were released ahead of the album's premiere; "Deadwood", "Poison for the Lost", "A Sign of Things to Come", and "Descent" (one day after the album's release).

"Deadwood" also has a live video released on 17 May, 2023. "Poison for the Lost", as frontman Josh Middleton stated, "was the last song to be written for the album. It quickly became apparent that this was going to be one of the biggest, most anthemic songs on the record."

== Track listing ==
All tracks are written by Josh Middleton.

A Sign of Things to Come track listing
No.	Title	Length
1.	"Deadwood"	4:24
2.	"A Sign of Things to Come"	4:32
3.	"Pariahs"	3:51
4.	"Poison for the Lost"	4:19
5.	"Descent"	4:16
6.	"Absent"	3:55
7.	"Eye for an Eye"	4:12
8.	"Judas"	4:26
9.	"Thorns"	4:14
10.	"A Godless Throne"	5:06
Total length:		43:15

== Personnel ==
=== Sylosis ===
- Josh Middleton – lead guitar, vocals
- Alex Bailey – rhythm guitar
- Conor Marshall – bass
- Ali Richardson – drums

=== Additional personnel ===
- Scott Atkins – production
- Josh Middleton – production, mixing
- Ermin Hamidovic – mastering

== Charts ==
Chart performance for A Sign of Things to Come
Chart (2023)	Peak position
Scottish Albums (Official Charts)	23
Swiss Albums (Schweizer Hitparade)	93
UK Album Downloads (Official Charts)	31
UK Independent Albums (Official Charts)	11
UK Rock & Metal Albums (Official Charts)	2
