= Pupil Slicer =

British mathcore band

- Origin: London, England
- Genres: Mathcore, grindcore, mathgrind
- Years active: 2016–present
- Label: Prosthetic Records
- Members: Kate Davies; Josh Andrews; Luke Booth; Ollie Miles
- Past members: Luke Fabian; Alex Brown; Frank Muir (studio)
- Website: pupilslicer.com

Pupil Slicer (stylised in all caps) are a British mathcore band from London, currently signed to Prosthetic Records.

== History ==
Pupil Slicer formed after Kate Davies, (Note: Davies uses they/them pronouns.) having discovered heavy music while at university in London, posted in an online forum for musicians, where they met drummer Josh Andrews. Davies and Andrews were involved in multiple projects together before Pupil Slicer, including a black metal band. Luke Fabian later joined them as bassist, filling a position for a gig at short notice. Andrews and Fabian introduced Davies to bands such as Botch, The Dillinger Escape Plan and Code Orange, which would go on to become major influences for Pupil Slicer.

Davies began writing Pupil Slicer's first full-length album, Mirrors, in 2018. After the band's original vocalist left a short while into the project, Davies took over vocals. Mirrors was released in 2021, after the band signed with Prosthetic Records in 2020, and was described as containing elements of powerviolence, mathcore and grind. Pupil Slicer supported a tour with Rolo Tomassi and Heriot in 2022, as well as performing at ArcTanGent Festival and Bloodstock.

Pupil Slicer released their second album, Blossom, in 2023. Within this album, Davies was inspired by narratives in the video games Final Fantasy XIV: Endwalker and Outer Wilds, as well as the Nine Inch Nails concept album The Downward Spiral. The album was produced by Lewis Johns, who had previously worked with Svalbard and Rolo Tomassi. It has been described as containing elements of black metal, groove metal and metalcore. Pupil Slicer performed at Download Festival for the first time in 2023.

In November 2023, Pupil Slicer announced Luke Fabian's departure from the band, along with their live guitarist Alex Brown. The band stated "We have mutually agreed that working together professionally is something we can no longer continue with. However we would like to thank Luke for his unparalleled skills and contribution on the bass and vocals. It also wouldn’t feel right to not highlight his massive contributions and work behind the scenes in Pupil Slicer, of which we are eternally grateful.".

In early 2025, Pupil Slicer announced two new singles, "Heather" and "Black Scrawl", written alongside new bassist and backing vocalist Luke Booth.

== Discography ==
=== Studio albums ===
- Mirrors (2021)
- Blossom (2023)
- Fleshwork (2025)

=== EPs ===
- PUPIL SLICER (2017)
- Death Goals/PUPIL SLICER (2017)
- Sense Offender/PUPIL SLICER (2017)

=== Singles ===
- L'appel du Vide (featuring Carson Pace) (2020)
- Collective Unconscious (2021)
- Thermal Runaway (featuring Cara Drolshagen) (2022)
