= Bleed from Within =

Scottish metalcore band

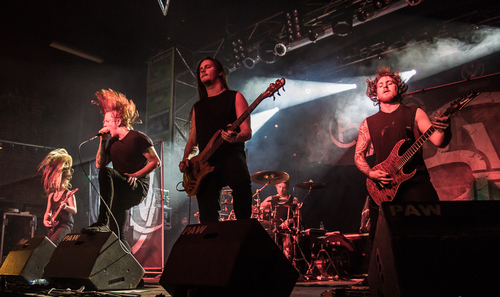
- Bleed from Within live in Nuremberg in 2013. From left to right: Craig Gowans, Scott Kennedy, Davie Provan, Ali Richardson (background) and Martyn Evans.

Background information
- Origin: Glasgow, Scotland
- Genres: Metalcore; melodic death metal; groove metal; deathcore (early)
- Years active: 2005–present
- Labels: Nuclear Blast; Century Media; Rising
- Members: Scott Kennedy; Ali Richardson; Craig Gowans; Davie Provan; Steven Jones
- Past members: Dave Lennon; Scott McCreadie; Martyn Evans
- Website: bleedfromwithin.com

Bleed from Within are a Scottish metalcore band from Glasgow, formed in 2005. The band's current lineup consists of lead vocalist Scott Kennedy, drummer Ali Richardson, bassist Davie Provan, lead guitarist Craig Gowans, and rhythm guitarist, clean vocalist Steven Jones. The band has released seven studio albums and three EPs, with their latest Zenith released in 2025 through Nuclear Blast.

== History ==
=== Formation, Humanity, and Empire (2005–2011) ===
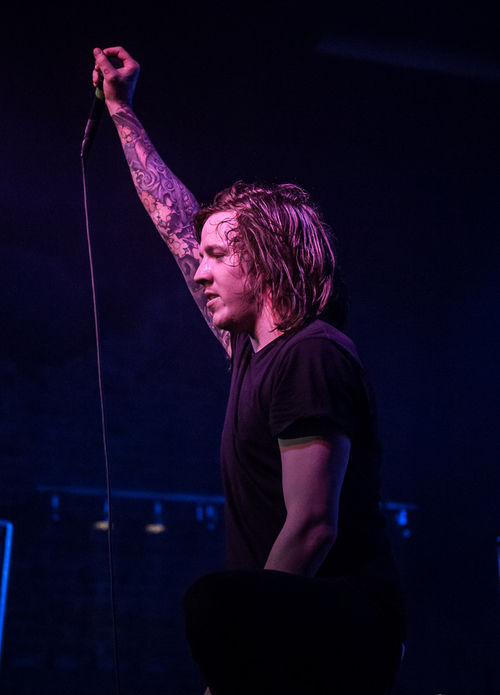
Vocalist Scott Kennedy in Nuremberg in 2013

The band formed in Glasgow where they initially met at a youth club where they would cover Lamb of God songs. In July 2009, the band released their debut album Humanity on Rising Records, described as 'DIY deathcore'. The first tour that garnered them large scale exposure was in 2010 when they supported Sylosis and While She Sleeps on the Metal Hammer Razor Tour. Early in their career, Bleed from Within also toured with Soilwork, All that Remains, After the Burial, Suicide Silence, Caliban and Rise to Remain. In May 2010 they released the album Empire, again on Rising Records. It has been described as having 'more emphasis on the groove metal and melodeath aspects' although both albums have since been removed from streaming services.

=== Uprising (2012–2016) ===
In August 2012, the band signed to Century Media Records. Their talks with the label started when they were approached after their performance at the 2011 Graspop festival in Belgium, where they were called up as a replacement. The band confirmed that they were working with producers Romesh Dodangoda and Adam “Nolly” Getgood while Logan Mader would mix their third album. Between September and November 2012, the band supported While She Sleeps across the UK and co-headlined a tour around Europe with Bury Tomorrow. They supported Miss May I on their UK tour in November/December, before starting their studio sessions.

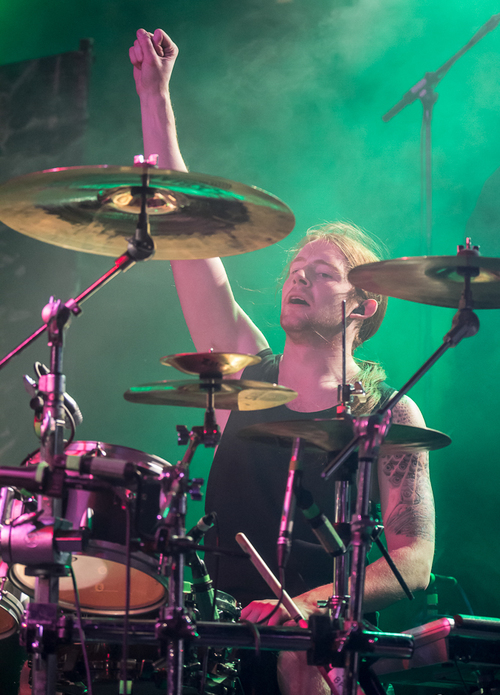
Drummer Ali Richardson in Nuremberg in 2013

In March 2013, the band completed their first tour of the year, supporting Testament in mainland Europe. Singer Scott Kennedy commented on the difficulty of performing to Testament's crowd citing the older average age of the audience and their lack of familiarity with Bleed from Within's music, but also stated that he felt the band had won over the crowd eventually. On 25 March 2013, Bleed from Within's third studio album Uprising was released on Century Media. Kennedy, when commenting on the album, said that "While it's angry, it's still positive. It's about looking to the light and realising that you're the only person who can make a difference in your life." The drums and vocals were recorded with producer Romesh Dodangoda and guitars and bass with Adam Getgood of Periphery. Uprising spawned two music videos; one for the album's lead single "It Lives in Me" and another for the title track. The album was later made available as a stream prior to its release. It also charted in the United Kingdom at number 13 on the UK Rock Chart. Critically, the album was well received and praised for its improved production and improved songwriting but was also criticised for offering very little in the way of innovation. To promote the album, the band embarked on a headlining tour of the UK.

In June 2013, Bleed from Within supported Megadeth on their four date tour of the United Kingdom. The band stated their excitement about the opportunity to support Megadeth, with Kennedy commenting "As a metal band, to go and support any of the Big 4 is something I never, ever though would happen". Their performances with Megadeth were met with widespread critical acclaim despite reports of ambivalent crowd reactions with English music journalist Malcolm Dome commenting that "You have to feel sorry for Bleed From Within [...] [they] get no more than polite attention from the crowd, and they deserve more". Later in the month, the band was awarded British publication Metal Hammer's Golden Gods Awards for 'Best New Band'.

In November 2013, Bleed from Within were one of four acts alongside Amon Amarth, Hell and Carcass for Metal Hammer's Defenders of the Faith IV tour.

In April 2014, the band announced they had launched an Indiegogo campaign to help crowdfund a 4-track EP, which would act as a bridge between Uprising and their fourth full-length album.

=== Lineup changes and Era (2017–2019) ===
In 2017 it was announced that Steven Jones would join the band as a new guitarist and the addition of clean vocals, replacing Martyn Evans. It was later announced in December that Bleed from Within had finished working on a new studio album set for release in early 2018 and that the first single would be released in January 2018.

The band's fourth album Era was released on 6 April 2018. The first single from the album, "Alive", was released on 19 January 2018.

=== Fracture (2020–2021) ===
On 29 November 2019, the band released a new single "The End of All We Know" and also confirmed that the band was working on a new album, which was later titled Fracture and released on 29 May 2020. Matt Heafy from Trivium performs a guest solo on "Night Crossing" from Fracture.

On 12 November 2021, the band released a new single titled "I Am Damnation" and announced that they had signed to metal heavyweight label, Nuclear Blast Records, joining the worldwide family.

=== Shrine and Zenith (2022–present) ===
On 3 March 2022, Bleed From Within announced that their sixth studio album Shrine was set to be released on 3 June 2022 through Nuclear Blast Records, and released the album's second single "Levitate". The album's third single "Stand Down" was released on 14 April, followed by the fourth single "Flesh and Stone" on 12 May.

Their new album Zenith was released on 4 April 2025 through Nuclear Blast. Singles were released in advance for "Hands of Sin", "In Place of Your Halo", and "A Hope in Hell", with "In Place of Your Halo" making its live debut two days before its single release. The band embarked on a European tour to promote the album with After the Burial and Great American Ghost in September and October 2025.

The band will tour in the spring of 2026 with Sylosis, Great American Ghost and Life Cycles as support.

== Musical style ==
Bleed from Within's general musical style has been stated by critics to be a blend of metalcore, melodic death metal and groove metal. They started out as deathcore in their earlier material, and their new album Zenith marked a comeback to the "melodic side of Bleed From Within's origins in" the genre. Their stylistic features are their use of "deep heavy breakdowns", growling vocals and groove infused riffs. Metal Hammer magazine's online editor Merlin Alderslade summarised Bleed from Within's style saying they are "power and groove-laden muscle that modern metal is able to produce".

Their first two albums, Humanity and Empire have been described as "bruising yet melodic" and their debut album Humanity was considered "straight-up deathcore" as it came out. Their third album Uprising has been described "parts Lamb of God, parts Black Crown-era Suicide Silence and parts Pantera" and Metal Hammer writer Merlin Alderslade believes the band should be compared to Lamb of God and Machine Head rather than the deathcore style of Suicide Silence and early Bring Me the Horizon. The album's typical song structure features sinister guitar riffs to open a song which transitions into "epic metal melodies".

Across the group's discography, it has been noted that Kennedy's vocal style has shifted from the typical deathcore scream/growl vocals of their early releases to a strict throaty growl on more recent albums, with guitarist Steven Jones adding in clean vocals, which has been said to bring more clearness to the lyrics.

== Band members ==
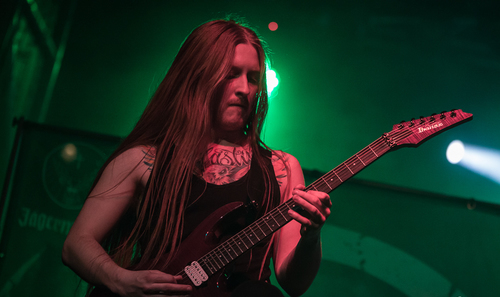
Craig Gowans switched from bass to lead guitar in 2009.

Current

- Scott Kennedy – lead vocals (2005–present)
- Ali Richardson – drums (2005–present)
- Craig "Goonzi" Gowans – lead guitar (2009–present); bass (2005–2009)
- Davie Provan – bass (2009–present)
- Steven "Snev" Jones – rhythm guitar, clean vocals (2017–present)

Former

- Scott McCreadie – lead guitar (2005–2009)
- Dave Lennon – rhythm guitar (2005–2011)
- Martyn Evans – rhythm guitar (2011–2017)

Timeline

== Discography ==
Studio albums

- Humanity (2009)
- Empire (2010)
- Uprising (2013)
- Era (2018)
- Fracture (2020)
- Shrine (2022)
- Zenith (2025)

Live albums

- Viral Hysteria (2021)

EPs

- In the Eyes of the Forgotten (2006)
- Welcome to the Plague Year (2007)
- Death Walk (2014)

== Music videos ==
- "Servants of Divinity"
- "The Healing"
- "Last of Our Kind"
- "It Lives in Me"
- "Uprising"
- "Silence Them All"
- "Alive"
- "Afterlife"
- "Crown of Misery"
- "Cast Down"
- "The End of All We Know"
- "Into Nothing"
- "Night Crossing"
- "Fracture"
- "I Am Damnation"
- "Levitate"
- "Stand Down"
- "Flesh and Stone"
- "Killing Time"
- "Hands of Sin"
- "In Place of Your Halo"
- "A Hope in Hell"
- "God Complex"

== Accolades ==
Metal Hammer Golden Gods Awards

Year	Nominee / work	Award	Result
2013	Bleed from Within	Best New Band	Won
