= 2000trees =

Music festival in Gloucestershire, England

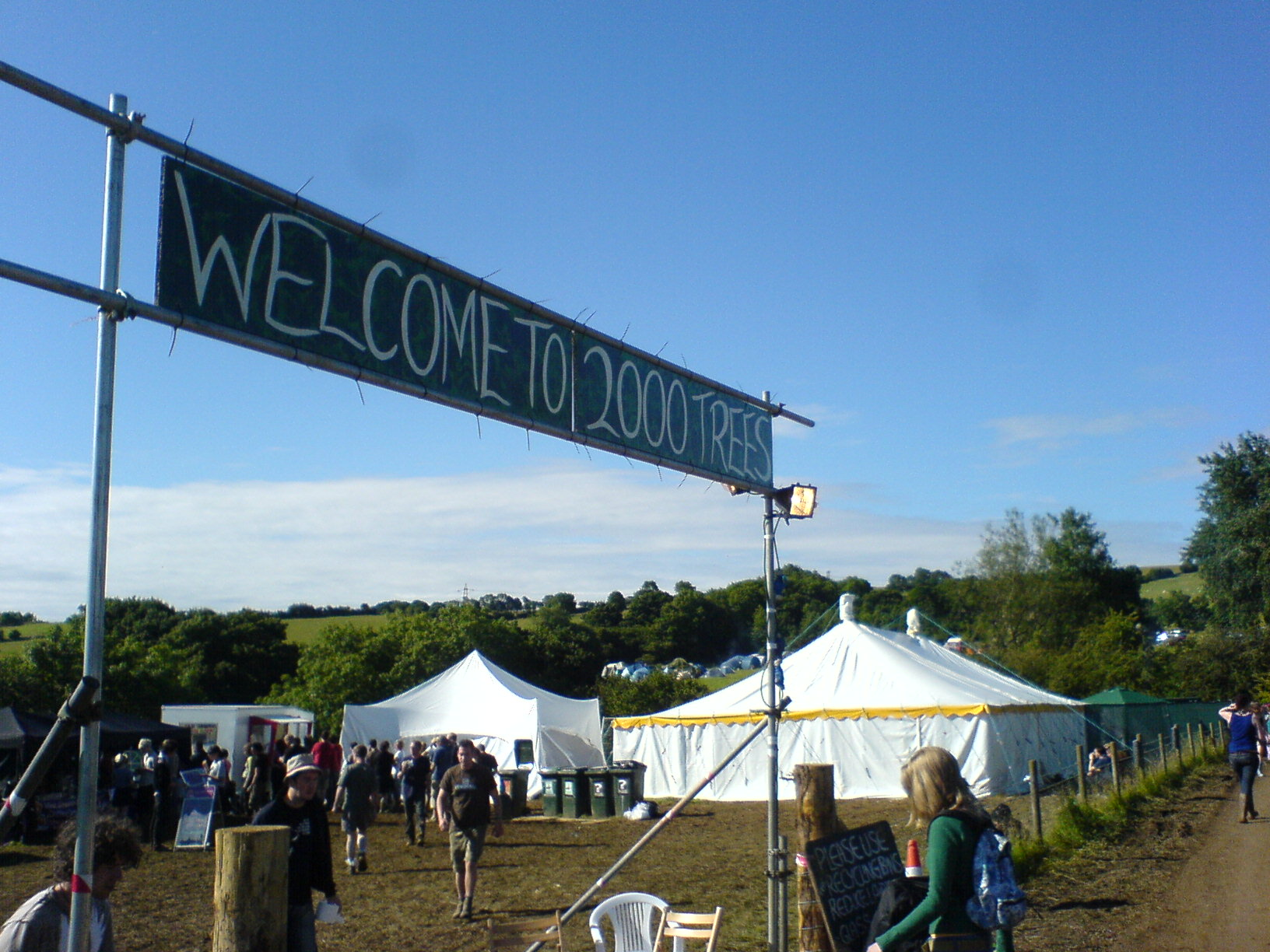
- Entrance to the 2008 festival
- Genre: Punk rock, alternative rock, indie rock, electronic
- Locations: Upcote Farm, Withington
- Years active: 2007–present
- Website: 2000trees.co.uk

2000trees is an independent rock music festival held over three days at Upcote Farm, Withington, near Cheltenham in Gloucestershire, with a focus on upcoming and underground acts. It won the Grass Roots Festival Award at the UK Festival Awards 2010, 2013 and 2017 and the Best Medium-Sized UK Festival in 2018.

== History ==
2000trees was started by six friends in 2007, focusing on providing an alternative to large mainstream rock festivals. The festival focuses on rock and indie music and is run as an independent business, with the core organiser team only paying themselves salaries if the festival makes a profit. It has a cap of 15,000 attendees, to keep the "unique 2000Trees vibe" of a small festival with a close-knit atmosphere.

The first edition of the festival featured performances from Frank Turner, InMe, Brigade, and Devil Sold His Soul.

The festival was cancelled in 2020 and 2021 due to complications relating to the COVID-19 pandemic. In 2021, issues including international travel restrictions preventing acts from entering the United Kingdom, and the government not providing insurance to the live events industry in the event of cancellation, prevented the running of the festival.

== Lineups ==
Year	Dates	Headliners
2007	13-14 July	Frank Turner, InMe, Brigade, and Devil Sold His Soul
2008	11-12 July	The Eighties Matchbox B-Line Disaster, Art Brut and The Duke Spirit
2009	17-18 July	British Sea Power, Fightstar and The King Blues
2010	16-17 July	Frank Turner and The Subways
2011	14-16 July	Dan le Sac Vs Scroobius Pip, Frightened Rabbit, The King Blues and Los Campesinos!
2012	12-14 July	Guillemots, 65daysofstatic and The Futureheads
2013	11-13 July	Frank Turner, Stornoway and Mystery Jets
2014	10-12 July	Band of Skulls and Frightened Rabbit
2015	9-11 July	Deaf Havana and Alkaline Trio
2016	7-9 July	Refused and Twin Atlantic
2017	6-8 July	Slaves, Nothing but Thieves and Mallory Knox
2018	12-14 July	At the Drive-In, Twin Atlantic and Enter Shikari
2019	11-13 July	Frank Turner and the Sleeping Souls, You Me at Six and Deaf Havana
2020	Cancelled	Jimmy Eat World, AFI and Thrice were due to headline before the festival was cancelled due to the COVID-19 pandemic
2021	Cancelled	Jimmy Eat World and Thrice were due to headline before the festival was cancelled due to the COVID-19 pandemic
2022	6-9 July	Jimmy Eat World, Turnstile, Thrice, and Idles
2023	5-8 July	Soft Play, Bullet for My Valentine and Frank Carter and the Rattlesnakes
2024	10-13 July	The Gaslight Anthem, The Chats and Don Broco
2025	09-12 July	PVRIS, Kneecap, Coheed and Cambria, Taking Back Sunday and Alexisonfire
2026	8-11 July	Alkaline Trio replaced by Don Broco due to illness, Funeral For a Friend and Neck Deep
