= Sylosis =

British heavy metal band

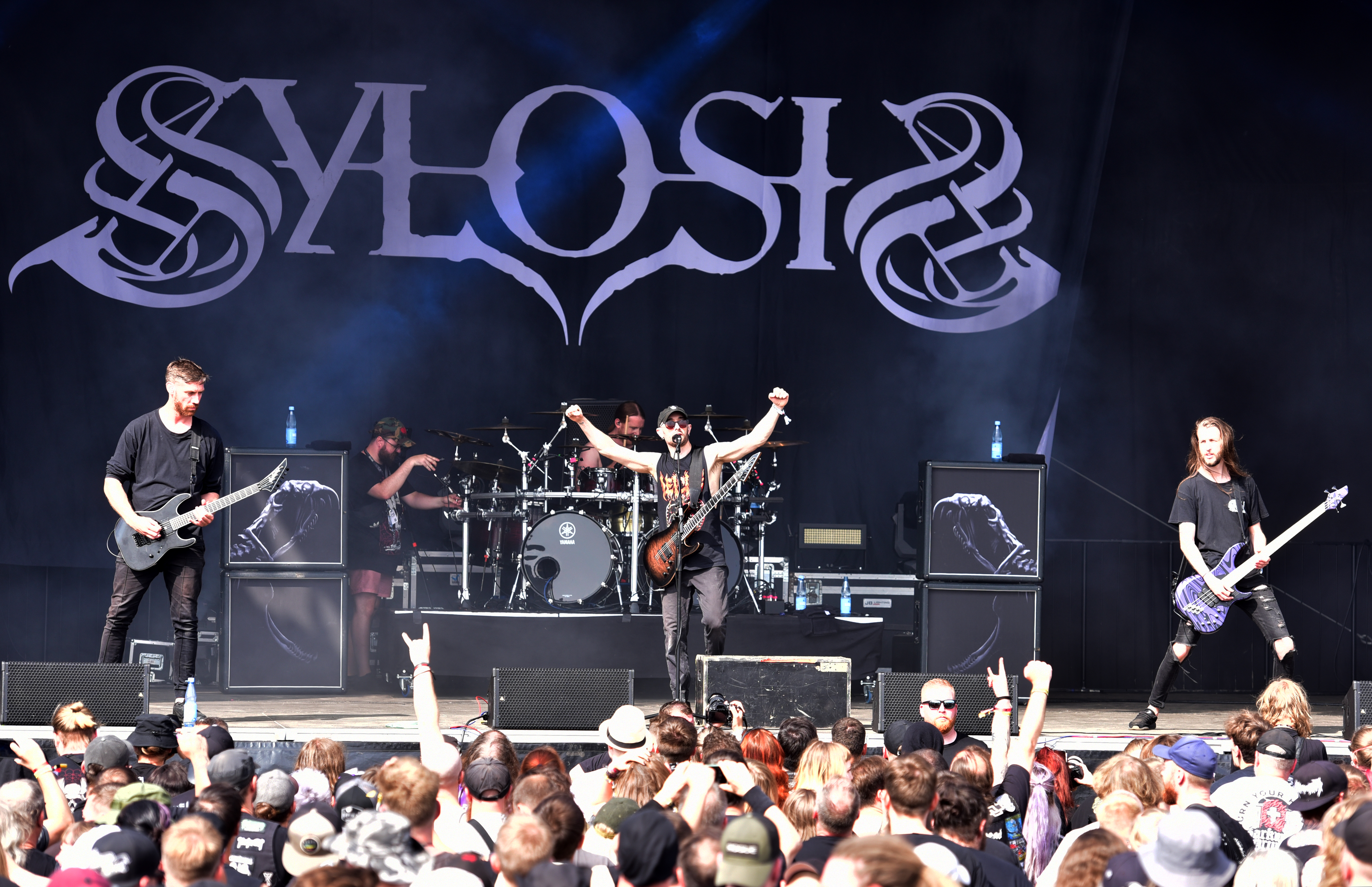
- Sylosis at Reload Festival 2024

Background information
- Origin: Reading, Berkshire, England
- Genres: Thrash metal; progressive metal; melodic death metal; metalcore
- Years active: 2000–2016, 2019–present
- Label: Nuclear Blast
- Members: Josh Middleton; Ali Richardson; Conor Marshall; Ben Thomas
- Past members: Carl Parnell; Jamie Graham; Dave Anderson; Ben Hollyer; Dan Peirce; Glen Chamberlain; Richard Zananiri; Josh Bracken; Gurneet Ahluwalia; Rob Callard; Chris Steele; Jay Colios-Terry; Alex Bailey

Sylosis are a British heavy metal band formed in Reading, Berkshire, in 2000. Signed to Nuclear Blast Records, the band has released seven studio albums, a live album, two EPs and twelve music videos. Their latest album, The New Flesh, was released on February 20, 2026.

The band has had multiple line-up changes. Josh Middleton is the sole consistent member. He has been the band's lead guitarist on every album and the lead vocalist since their second studio album, Edge of the Earth.

== History ==
=== Formation and Conclusion of an Age (2000–2009) ===
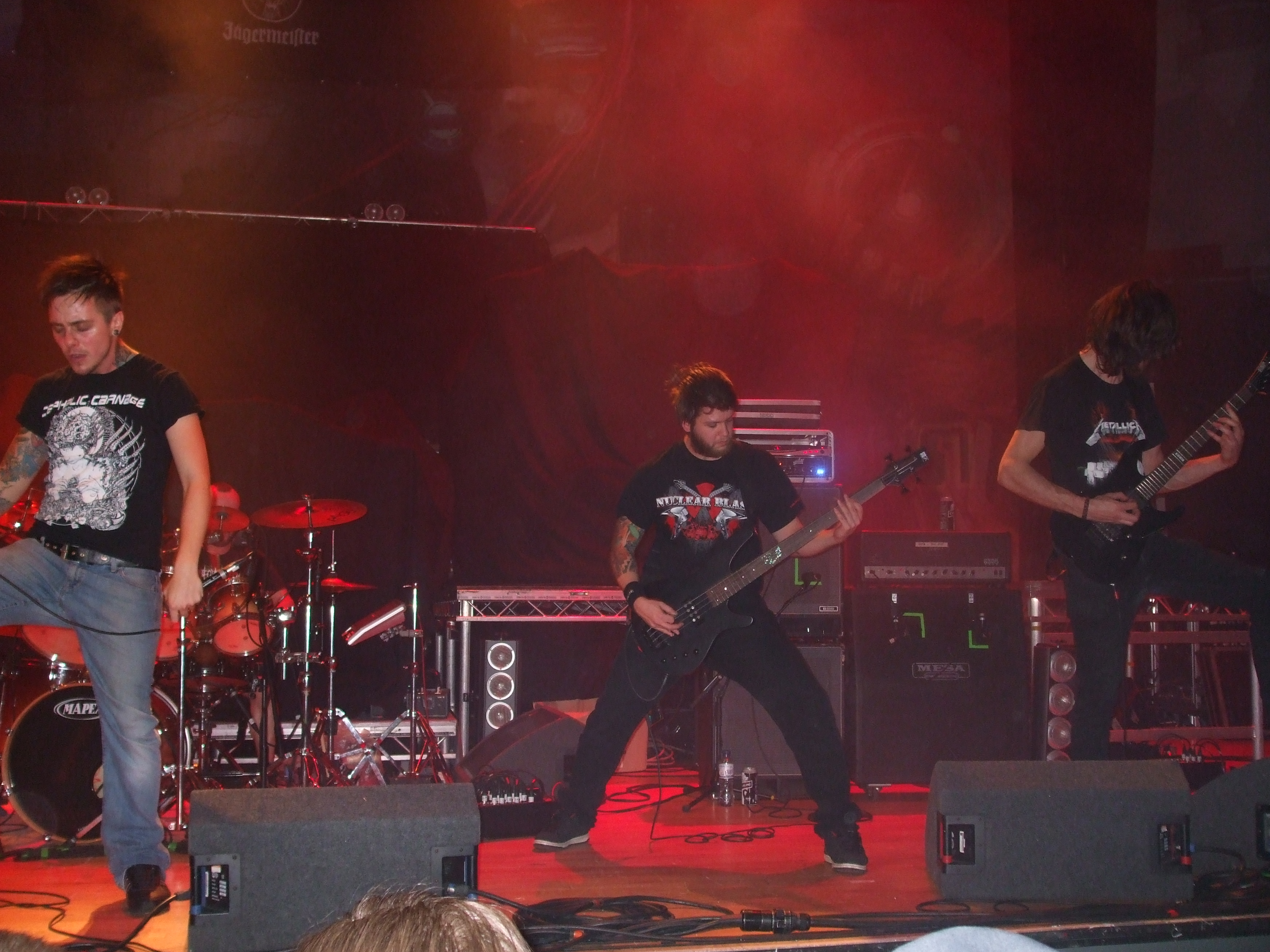
Sylosis performing in 2009

Sylosis was formed in 2000 by guitarist Josh Middleton and bassist Carl Parnell, who began playing extreme metal with friends from school. Sylosis released a couple of EPs; 2006's Casting Shadows and 2007's The Supreme Oppressor in the UK on small indie label In at the Deep End Records. In December 2007, Sylosis signed with Nuclear Blast Records, and they released their debut album, Conclusion of an Age, in October 2008.

Middleton remarked on the style of Conclusion of an Age, "The foundation of our sound is old school Bay Area thrash. We don't downtune and we don't play breakdowns. We do like to incorporate lots of different metal styles and textures into our music. We like make all of our songs really epic. We like progressive stuff, brutal stuff and melodic stuff." After recording their debut studio album, guitarist Gurneet Ahluwalia was replaced with ex-Viatrophy guitarist Alex Bailey in time for an early 2009 European tour with The Black Dahlia Murder, Cephalic Carnage and Psycroptic.

Sylosis were an opening act on the third stage at Download Festival in Castle Donington, along with appearances at the New England Metal and Hardcore Festival, and an opening slot on the Bohemia stage at Sonisphere Festival. A UK headline tour was announced for October/November 2009, but was cancelled when the band were offered an opening slot on the DragonForce UK tour in November/December 2009.

=== Edge of the Earth, Monolith, and RV Accident (2010–2013) ===
Sylosis replaced Rise to Remain during the UK leg of As I Lay Dying's European tour in 2010. Sylosis entered the studio in 2010 to record their second full-length studio album, Edge of the Earth, released in March 2011. They recorded a third studio album, Monolith, with Romesh Dodangoda in Wales at Monnow Valley Studio. Monolith was released on 5 October 2012 in Germany, 8 October 2012 in UK & Europe, 9 October 2012 in USA, and 10 October 2012 in Japan via Nuclear Blast Records. Since January 2013, the band have headlined a UK tour as well featuring on the Soundwave Festival in Australia. They toured with Hellyeah, In Flames and headliner Lamb of God in late 2012. The band had a main supporting role on a tour with Killswitch Engage in Europe during April and May 2013. Sylosis were announced as the opening band for the Trivium and DevilDriver North American co-headline tour with After the Burial as another supporting band. The tour was scheduled for October and November.

On 25 September, the members of Sylosis were in an RV accident, the injuries from which resulted in the withdrawal of their shows supporting Trivium and DevilDriver.

=== Dormant Heart, departure of Rob Callard, and hiatus (2014–2016) ===
After the members of Sylosis recovered from their injuries, they toured the UK and Europe as main support to DevilDriver with Bleed from Within. On this tour, Sylosis drummer Rob Callard was unable to play due to other commitments. Ali Richardson, drummer of Bleed From Within, filled in for the remainder of the tour.

In late September 2014, Rob Callard left Sylosis after nine years. His replacement was announced to be Ali Richardson. Richardson's relationship with Sylosis started on the DevilDriver tour earlier in the year.

At the start of October 2014, Sylosis announced their fourth album, Dormant Heart, released on 12 January 2015 through Nuclear Blast Records.

During the second half of May 2015, Sylosis toured Europe with Wovenwar. They played at several festivals over the summer, such as Graspop Metal Meeting and Hellfest, among others.

In October 2016, Sylosis announced a hiatus, as Middleton filled in for British metalcore band Architects on guitar due to the passing of their guitarist, Tom Searle, a friend of Middleton's. After 11 months, Middleton joined Architects as an official member, stating he would still remain in Sylosis.

=== Return and Cycle of Suffering (2019–2022) ===
In a March 2019 interview, Middleton confirmed that the band remained a going concern, and that he intended to release a new Sylosis album in 2019. On 5 December 2019, Nuclear Blast revealed the pre-order for an apparent new record titled Cycle of Suffering, to be released on 14 February 2020. A day later, the band returned from hiatus and confirmed that a new album would be released on 7 February 2020. This was followed by the first single and music video from the album, "I Sever". This was accompanied by the news that bassist Carl Parnell had left the band and been replaced with Conor Marshall.

To promote the album, the band supported Trivium on their "A Light or a Distant Mirror" live concert that was held at Full Sail University and streamed online. The concert did not have a live audience due to the COVID-19 pandemic.

On 11 December 2020, Sylosis released the single "Worship Decay".

On 8 March 2021, Sylosis announced a vinyl release of Conclusion of an Age and released "Plight of the Soul", a previously unreleased B-side track from the album.

On 3 December 2021, Sylosis released the single "Immovable Stone", and Middleton stated a new album would be released early 2022. On 9 August 2022, Sylosis released the single "Heavy is the Crown", the first of a trilogy of singles to be released in 2022.

=== A Sign of Things To Come, The Path & New Flesh (2022–present) ===
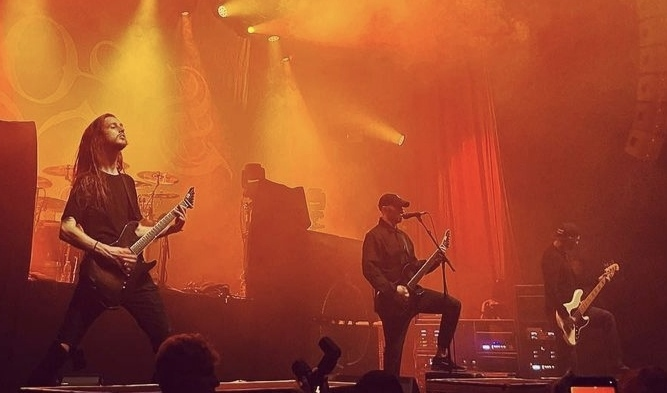
Sylosis performing in Manchester, 2023

On 16 March 2023, Sylosis released the single and music video "Deadwood". On 1 June, they announced their sixth studio album, A Sign of Things to Come, along with the single and music video "Poison for the Lost." The title track from the album and an accompanying music video were released on 20 July. The album was released on 8 September 2023, along with the music video for "Descent." On 16 January 2024, the band released the music video for the song "Absent."

On 3 October 2024, Sylosis surprise-released the EP The Path, along with the video for the title track, which features Debbie Gough of Heriot. One week later, the band announced the departure of guitarist Alex Bailey, with former live guitarist Ben Thomas replacing him. Thomas later moved to bass, with Conor Marshall taking on rhythm guitar.

The band supported Fit for an Autopsy in the fall in the United States and Europe. They headlined a tour of Australia in early 2025, with support from AngelMaker.

Sylosis released their seventh album, The New Flesh, on 20 February 2026.

== Band members ==
=== Current ===
- Josh Middleton – lead guitar (2000–present), vocals (2010–present)
- Ali Richardson – drums (2014–present)
- Conor Marshall – rhythm guitar (2024–present, live 2023), bass (2019–2024)
- Ben Thomas – bass (2024–present, live 2023)

=== Former ===
- Glen Chamberlain – vocals (2000–2003)
- Dave Anderson - vocals (2003–2005)
- Jay Colios-Terry – drums (2000–2005)
- Ben Hollyer – vocals (2005–2007)
- Gurneet Ahluwalia – rhythm guitar (2000–2007)
- Chris Steele – drums (2006–2007)
- Richard Zananiri – rhythm guitar (2005–2009)
- Jamie Graham – vocals (2007–2010)
- Josh Bracken – vocals (2006)
- Rob Callard – drums (2005–2006, 2007–2014)
- Carl Parnell – bass (2000–2019)
- Alex Bailey – rhythm guitar (2008–2024)

=== Touring ===
- Gurneet Ahluwalia – rhythm guitar (2012)
- Brandon Ellis – rhythm guitar (2011)
- Travis Regnier – drums (2024; substitute for Ali Richardson)

== Discography ==
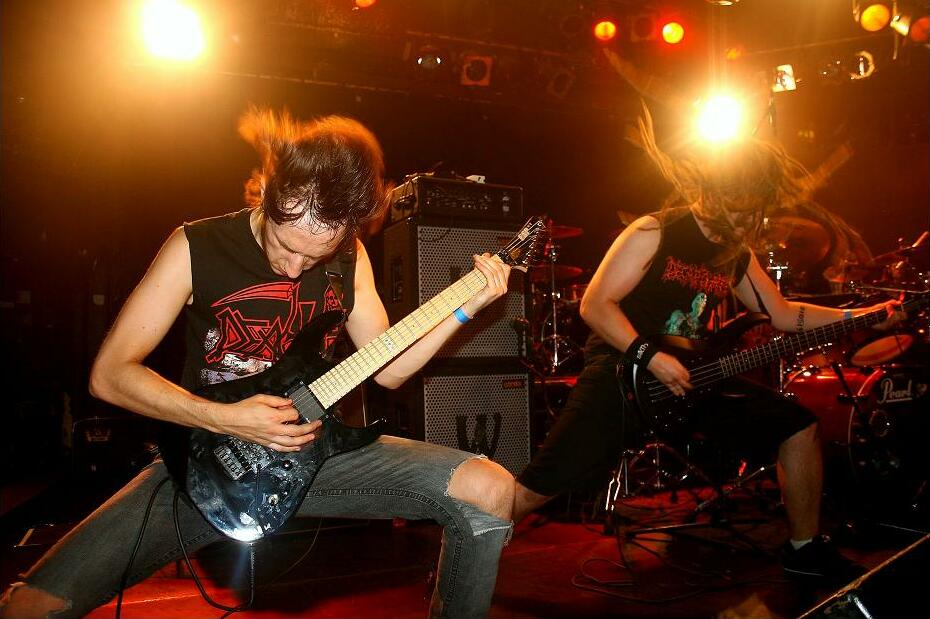
Sylosis performing in 2007

=== Studio albums ===
- Conclusion of an Age (Nuclear Blast, 2008)
- Edge of the Earth (Nuclear Blast, 2011)
- Monolith (Nuclear Blast, 2012)
- Dormant Heart (Nuclear Blast, 2015)
- Cycle of Suffering (Nuclear Blast, 2020)
- A Sign of Things to Come (Nuclear Blast, 2023)
- The New Flesh (Nuclear Blast, 2026)

=== EPs ===
- Casting Shadows (In at the Deep End, 2006)
- The Supreme Oppressor (In at the Deep End, 2007)
- The Path (Nuclear Blast, 2024)

=== Live albums ===
- Sylosis Live at High Voltage (2011)
- Sylosis Live At: Lite Up Studios (2020)

=== Singles ===
- "Strength Beyond Strength" (Pantera cover, 2009)
- "Slings and Arrows" (2012)
- "Mercy" (2014)
- "Different Masks on the Same Face" (2016)
- "I Sever" (2019)
- "Calcified" (2020)
- "Worship Decay" (2020)
- "Immovable Stone" (2021)
- "Heavy Is the Crown" (2022)
- "Deadwood" (2023)
- "Poison for the Lost" (2023)
- "A Sign of Things to Come" (2023)
- "Descent" (2023)
- "Absent" (2024)
- "The New Flesh" (2025)
- "Erased" (2026)
- "Lacerations" (2026)

=== Music videos ===
- "Teras" (2008)
- "After Lifeless Years" (2009)
- "Empyreal" (2011)
- "A Serpent's Tongue" (2011)
- "Fear the World" (2012)
- "All Is Not Well" (2013)
- "Mercy" (2014)
- "Leech" (2015)
- "Servitude" (2015)
- "I Sever" (2019)
- "Calcified" (2020)
- "Cycle of Suffering" (2020)
- "Worship Decay" (2020)
- "Immovable Stone" (2021)
- "Heavy Is the Crown" (2022)
- "Deadwood" (2023)
- "Poison for the Lost" (2023)
- "A Sign of Things to Come" (2023)
- "Descent" (2023)
- "Absent" (2024)
- "The Path" (2024)
- "Soured Ground" (2025)
- "The New Flesh" (2025)
- "Erased" (2026)
- "Lacerations" (2026)
- "Spared From The Guillotine" (2026)
