= Zeal & Ardor discography =

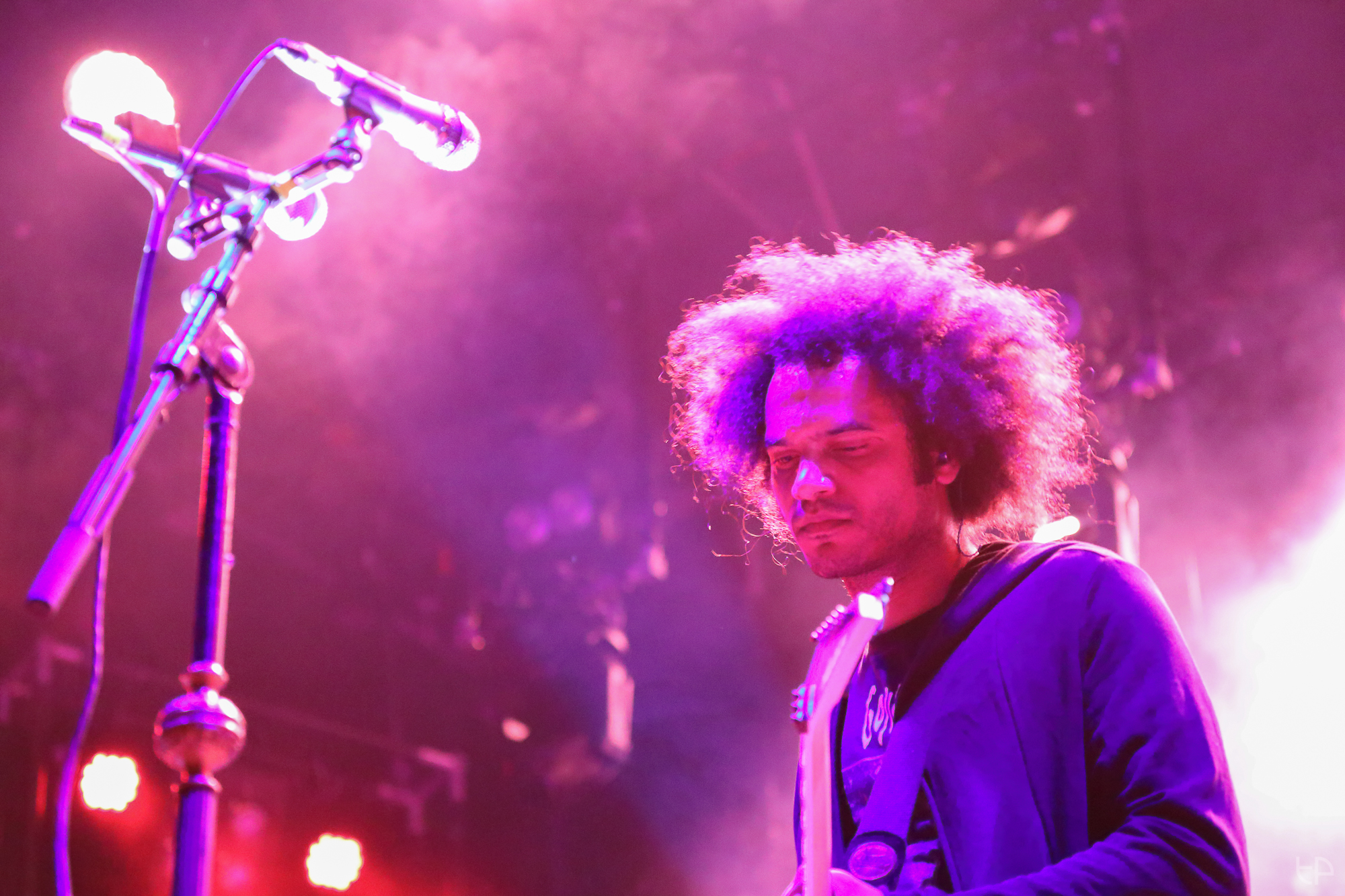
- Zeal & Ardor leader Manuel Gagneux
- Studio albums: 4
- EPs: 1
- Live albums: 2
- Singles: 18
- B-sides: 6

This is the complete discography of Swiss black metal band Zeal & Ardor. They have released three albums, two live albums, one EP, six B-sides and 15 singles.

== Albums ==
=== Studio albums ===
Year	Title	Peak chart positions						
Year	Title	SWI	AUT	BEL	GER	UK Rock	US Ind.	US Heat.
2016	Devil Is Fine	17	—	—	—	—	—	—
2018	Stranger Fruit	2	30	112	27	15	24	3
2022	Zeal & Ardor	5	—	—	27	—	—	—
2024	Greif	6	30	44	31	—	—	—
"—" denotes a recording that did not chart or was not released in that territory.

=== Demo albums ===
- Zeal and Ardor (2014)

=== Live albums ===
- Live in Montreux (2018)
- Live in London (2019)

=== EPs ===
- Wake of a Nation (2020)

== Singles ==
- "Devil Is Fine" (2016)
- "Come On Down" (2017)
- "Gravedigger's Chant (2018)
- "Waste" (2018)
- "Built On Ashes" (2018)
- "You Ain't Coming Back" (2018)
- "I Can't Breathe" (2020)
- "Vigil" (2020)
- "Tuskegee" (2020)
- "Trust No One" (2020)
- "Wake of a Nation" (2020)
- "Run" (2021)
- "Erase" (2021)
- "Bow" (2021)
- "Götterdämmerung" (2021)
- "Golden Liar" (2021)
- "Church Burns" (2022)
- "Firewake" (2022)
- "To My Ilk" (2024)
- "Clawing Out" (2024)
- "Fend You Off" (2024)
- "Hide in Shade" (2024)

== Other appearances ==
- "Baphomet" (2017) - 2017 Adult Swim Singles Program
- "Last Coat of Paint" - The Needle Drop LP (2019)
- "We Can't Be Found (Live 2018)" - Live At Wacken 2018: 29 Years Louder Than Hell (2019)
- "Footsteps at the Pond (Zeal & Ardor remix)" - on Panorama Remixed by La Dispute (2019)
- "Run (GEIZ version)" (2021)
- "Calloway" - Apple Music's Juneteenth 2021 Freedom Songs (2021)
