= Blood in the River =

Blood in the River may refer to:

- "Blood in the River", song by Econoline Crush from the album Affliction, 1995
- "Blood in the River", song by Zeal & Ardor from the album Devil Is Fine, 2016
- "Blood in the River", song by Flobots from the album Noenemies, 2017

== See also ==
- Blood River (disambiguation)
- River of Blood (disambiguation)
