= Stranger Fruit =

Studio album by Zeal & Ardor
- Released: 8 June 2018
- Genres: Avant-garde metal; black metal; soul
- Length: 47:52
- Label: MVKA
- Producers: Zebo Adam, Manuel Gagneux

Zeal & Ardor chronology
Devil Is Fine (2016)	Stranger Fruit (2018)	Live in London (2019)

Zeal & Ardor studio album chronology
Devil Is Fine (2016)	Stranger Fruit (2018)	Zeal & Ardor (2022)

Singles from Stranger Fruit
- 1. "Gravedigger's Chant" Released: 29 March 2018; 2. "Waste" Released: 27 April 2018; 3. "Built On Ashes" Released: 25 May 2018; 4. "You Ain't Coming Back" Released: 7 September 2018

Alternate cover

Stranger Fruit is the second studio album by avant-garde metal band Zeal & Ardor. It was released on 8 June 2018, through MVKA records. It is Zeal & Ardor's first release as a full band, previous releases were entirely composed by singer Manuel Gagneux, although Stranger Fruit only features drummer Marco Von Allmen from the full band alongside Gagneux.

Expanding on the post-black metal and soul sound of their previous album, it was preceded by the singles "Gravedigger's Chant", "Waste" and "Built on Ashes". The album was released to critical acclaim, charting on several international charts, including nearly topping the Swiss album charts at number two. It was placed on year-end lists for several publications, including Decibel, The A.V. Club, Consequence of Sound and Loudwire.

== Background ==
Manuel Gagneux announced the release of the album on 29 March 2018. The first single "Gravedigger's Chant" was released the same day. A second single, "Waste", was released on 27 April 2018. The third and final single "Built On Ashes", was released on 25 May. The title of the album is a reference to "Strange Fruit" by Billie Holiday, a song about racism and lynching of African Americans. Two music videos (directed by Samuel Morris & Manuel Sieber) were released, for "Intro" and "Gravedigger's Chant". Musically, the album is considered a continuation of the previous album Devil Is Fine.

Gagneux described the album title in an interview,

It's kind of a continuation of the thoughts of strange fruit, of people hanging, and, by extension, of people being shot or dying. It's not that happy of an idea, all in all. But that's kind of the times we live in."

Gagneux drew inspiration from non-metal artists such as Tom Waits, A Clockwork Orange composer Wendy Carlos and French composer Erik Satie during the writing of the album. Additionally, he listened to the field recordings of Alan Lomax. The album features references to Goetia, Yoruba, as well as obscure occult literature and history.

The album is produced by Gagneux and Zebo Adam, mixed by Kurt Ballou, and mastered by Alan Douches.

== Album artwork ==
The front cover features a green Granny Smith apple almost entirely obscured by the band's logo and a purple foreground. Each single features the apple in various states of disrepair; bruised ("Gravedigger's Chant"), chopped in half ("Waste" and "Built on Ashes"), and with bites taken out of it ("You Ain't Coming Back"). The photographs of the apple were taken by drummer Marco Von Allmen.

About the album's artwork, Gagneux stated "We thought way too long about it, and then just thought, 'What's a fruit?'. We just bought an apple and figured we needed to mess it up as a reference to The Beatles album and the forbidden fruit and also the poem from Billie Holiday."

== Music and lyrics ==
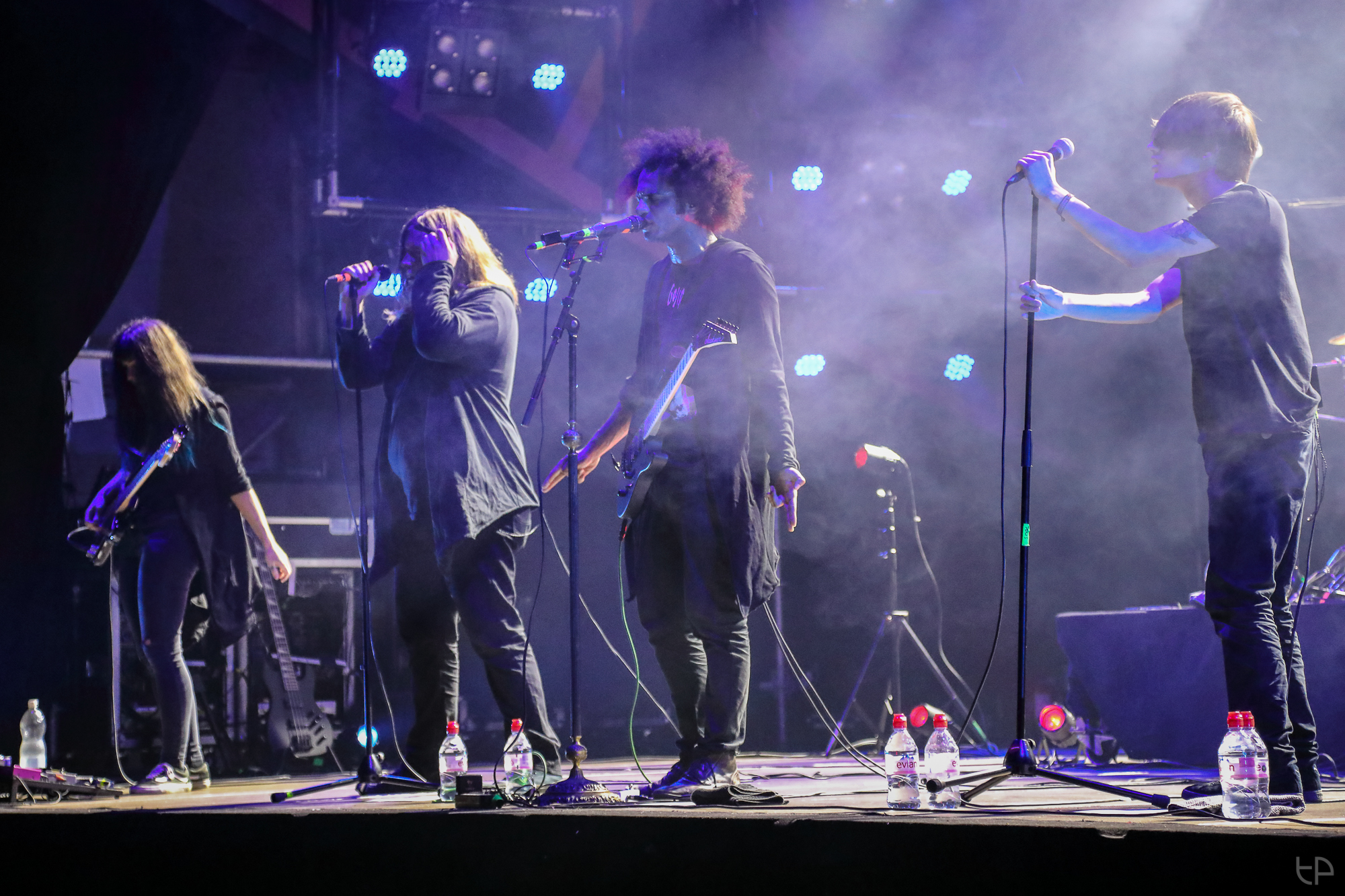
Zeal & Ardor expanded to a full band after recording the previous album.

The first track, "Intro", is a short track which Gagneux states "establishes a mood for the album to follow." "Gravedigger's Chant" features the lyrics "Bring the dead down low, Bring the dead body down to the graveyard, son. You can't run, you can't hide.", alongside piano and gospel-style vocals. Gagneux described the song, stating "The gravedigger's chant is the song sung by the people who lay your body to rest. These people don't care where you were, but they know what you did and who loved you. All they know is what lies before them. So they sing this song, since you can no longer breathe a note." He also stated the song was released as the lead single because "it's really not a metal song.. it's not typically what you would expect." "Servants", described as more melodic than other tracks, and featuring tremolo guitar is about "either a slave revolution" or a "message to the American Middle class".

"Don't You Dare" was first released in February 2017, and was performed live before being included on Stranger Fruit. Gagneux described the song as saying "The idea of something so horrible that merely looking at it will end you is fascinating to me.. Don't You Dare thematically plays with biblical demons as well as Lovecraftian elements that lend themselves well to this idea." He described the song as "portraying a different kind of character", calling it "commanding". "Fire of Motion" features an Aleister Crowley sample. "The Hermit" is one of four instrumental tracks on the album (alongside "The Fool", "Solve" and "Coagula"), which serve as "breathers for your ears before the heavy parts". "Row Row" is stated to have more soul elements, with Gagneux comparing it to Motown music, as well as saying it's the "turning point in the story" of the album. Loudwire described the song as the most blues based song by the band. "Ship on Fire" features occult chanting and is considered the 'second chapter' of "Row Row".

"Waste"
Sample of "Waste" from Stranger Fruit. The song demonstrates the band's mixture of soul and gospel with black metal.

"Waste" is a purposely contradictory song, using the Millennial whoop (a simplistic style used in many pop songs) in contrast to what Gagneux called "The darkest song on the album", fully incorporating the gospel and soul elements into black metal. The song features "crackling production, hellish screams, and out-of-nowhere blastbeats". "You Ain't Coming Back" was created with the intent of having a hard-hitting song without the extreme metal. Gagneux used guitar string dissonance to help achieve the effect. The song was released (alongside an instrumental version) as a single in September 2018. "We Can't Be Found" was the song that was worked on the longest, being described as "a bunch of riffs and beats we managed to amalgamate into something cohesive." "Stranger Fruit" was written with the intent of making a song difficult to listen to because of the lyrical narrative of the song. "Built On Ashes" references Strange Fruit, with the lyrics "like a strange fruit out of season, You are bound to die alone, And you will swing free in the breeze then." The song was written as a "bittersweet ending" to the album, as a way to summarize the entire album.

== Critical reception ==
Professional ratings
Aggregate scores
Source	Rating
Metacritic	77/100
Review scores
Source	Rating
The A.V. Club	A−
Exclaim!	3.5/5 stars
Loudwire	Positive
Allmusic	4/5 stars
Kerrang!	Positive
Metal Hammer	4.5/5 stars
Metal Storm	9.5/10
The National Student	5/5 stars
Pitchfork	7.3/10
Ultimate Guitar	4.5/5 stars

Stranger Fruit received positive reviews. Loudwire praised the album, stating "The talent and vision Manuel Gagneux possesses is rarer than the strangest fruit, and it would be a crime to sleep on this magnificent piece of art. Stranger Fruit is Album of the Year material and will surely be celebrated as the record which solidified Zeal & Ardor as irrefutably significant". Metal Hammer gave the album a 4.5 out of 5, stating "Working your way through the 16 tracks, you are confronted with a lot that is going on, as the album constantly walks a tightrope between brute force and sensitivity, from blastbeats to chorals to piano parts. But you never feel lost in this eclecticism, because the essence of what Manuel does is crystal clear."

Echoes and Dust also gave a positive review, stating "Stranger Fruit then is an album that bridges a gap between genre and meaning, and by extension between past and present. But it's an album that is focused, using the theme as a catalyst whilst never letting it take precedence over catchy and powerful song writing." The National Student, in a 5 out of 5 review, stated "This is modern metal's Terminator 2; its Empire Strikes Back; its Dark Knight – a sequel so well-executed that it surprisingly but undeniably leaves a fantastic original in its dust. Exclaim! compared the album favorably to the works of Deafheaven, also stating it was "unlike anything else you've ever heard." Kerrang! named it their album of the week upon release, stating "Stranger Fruit sounds like only half a step forward, stranger in some places, but familiar in others. That is not to take away from the eye-bulging intensity on display here, though... Stranger Fruit is a singularly raging proposition, and one that is still worthy of the Luciferian seal that adorns its cover."

Dansende Beren gave the album 4.5 out of 5 stars, stating "We do not like to mention the word masterpiece, but other than this, Stranger Fruit is almost impossible to describe. The record is so catchy and haunting that we can hardly get enough of it." Metal Insider stated "Stranger Fruit shattered these expectations. Zeal & Ardor has created 13 songs that flawlessly integrate the band's doleful disposition and phonic soul with instrumental ferocity". It Djents gave the album a positive review, stating "the band's sophomore effort is anything but a slump, showing that there's a lot more to explore at the intersection of soul and Satan... You will likely not hear another album so satisfyingly contradictory, anachronistically pleasing, or aesthetically challenging this year, or at least one done this well." In a 9/10 review, Kill Your Stereo stated "With 'Stranger Fruit', Zeal & Ardor are unlike any other band making waves through black metal, blues and other underground music circles of late. With this sublime second LP, they've summoned up a magical, morose, macabre and, for the most part, a masterful sound – a stunning sequel in every sense. This is undeniably Zeal & Ardor proving to the world that they weren't just some flash-in-the-pan act back in 2016, but rather, something truly special to behold."

Loudwire included the album in its June 2018 column of the Best Metal Albums of 2018 So Far. Metal Hammer also included it on their list of 50 Best Metal Albums of 2018 So Far, and it placed 5th on the Reader's Poll of the same subject. Revolver placed the album on its list of the "25 best albums of 2018 so far", as did The AV Club.

=== Accolades ===
Publication	Accolade	Rank	Ref.
Decibel	Decibel's Top 40 Albums of 2018	33	
Bandcamp Daily	The Best Albums of 2018	47	
Revolver	Revolver's Top 30 Albums of 2018	6	
The A.V. Club	A.V. Club's 10 Best Metal Albums of 2018	–	
Loudwire	Loudwire's 30 Best Metal Albums of 2018	4	
Consequence of Sound	Top 25 Metal + Hard Rock Albums of 2018	11	
Loudwire	30 Best Metal songs of 2018	11 ("Ship on Fire")	
Upset Magazine	The Best of 2018	50	
All Things Loud	Top 10 Albums of the year	9	
Metal Insider	Joe Koza's Top 10 Metal Albums of 2018	1	
Metal Injection	Metal Injection Writers' Collective Top 20 Albums of 2018	4	
MondoSonoro	Best albums of 2018	20	
Yahoo! Entertainment	Jon Wiederhorn's Top 10 albums of 2018	1	
WMMR.com	Sara's 20 Favorite Rock + Metal Albums of 2018	–	

== Commercial performance ==
Upon release, the album charted on several international charts. It debuted on the US Billboard Independent album charts at 24, the Billboard Heatseekers chart at 3, the UK Rock and Metal charts at 15, the German album charts at 27, the Flemish charts at 112, the Swiss charts at 2, and the Austrian charts at 30.

== Track listing ==
Credits adapted from the album's liner notes.

All tracks are written by Manuel Gagneux. "Fire of Motion" features samples of speeches by Aleister Crowley, "Don't You Dare" features samples of speeches by Anton Lavey.

No.	Title	Length
1.	"Intro"	2:14
2.	"Gravedigger's Chant"	3:11
3.	"Servants"	3:30
4.	"Don't You Dare"	3:29
5.	"Fire of Motion"	2:28
6.	"The Hermit (instrumental)"	2:42
7.	"Row Row"	3:06
8.	"Ship on Fire"	3:33
9.	"Waste"	3:19
10.	"You Ain't Coming Back"	3:19
11.	"The Fool (instrumental)"	2:25
12.	"We Can't Be Found"	3:32
13.	"Stranger Fruit"	3:29
14.	"Solve (instrumental)"	1:22
15.	"Coagula"	1:38
16.	"Built on Ashes"	4:35
Total length:		47:52

== Personnel ==
Credits adapted from the album's liner notes.

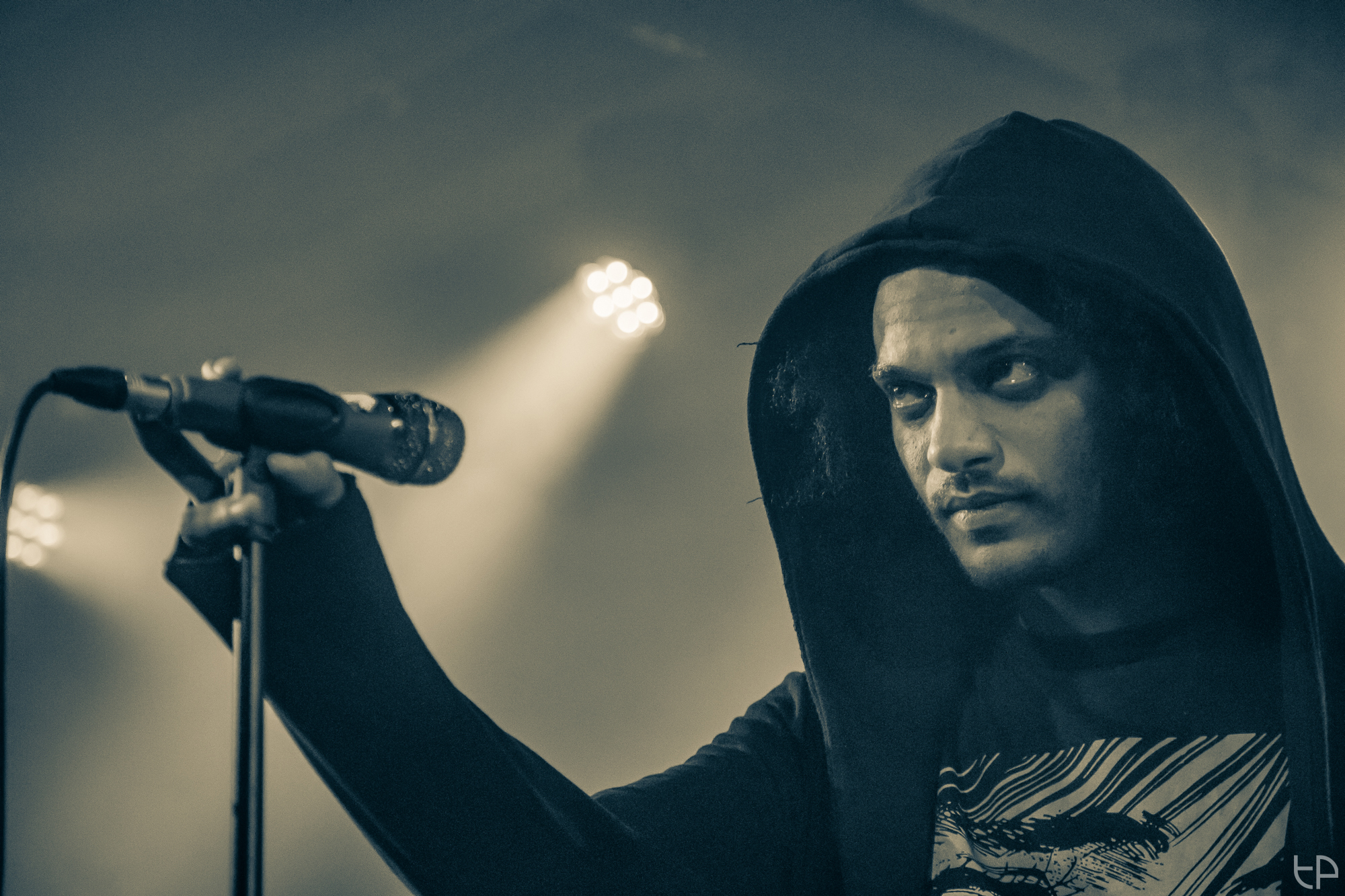
Manuel Gagneux was the main creative force behind the album, writing every song and playing every instrument except for drums.

Zeal & Ardor

- Manuel Gagneux – lead vocals, backing vocals, lead guitar, rhythm guitar, bass guitar, synthesizer, samples, programming, production, art design
- Marco Von Allmen – drums (all tracks except 6, 11, and 14), cover photography, artwork

Production

- Zebo Adam – production
- Kurt Ballou – mixing
- Alan Douches – mastering
- Noé Herrmann – art design

== Charts ==
Chart (2018)	Peak position
Austrian Albums (Ö3 Austria)	30
Belgian Albums (Ultratop Flanders)	112
German Albums (Offizielle Top 100)	27
Swiss Albums (Schweizer Hitparade)	2
UK Rock & Metal Albums (Official Charts)	15
US Heatseekers Albums (Billboard)	3
US Independent Albums (Billboard)	24
