= River of Blood =

River of Blood or Rivers of Blood may refer to:

== Arts, media, gaming ==
- Rivers of Blood, a 2009 true crime book by Robert Scott
- The Punisher: River of Blood, a collected edition of The Punisher War Zone #31-36
- "River of Blood", chapter eight of Stop Susan Williams, Cliffhangers
- Paka (River of Blood), a 2021 Indian drama film
- River of Blood, an adventure module in the Greyhawk campaign setting for Dungeons & Dragons
- Rivers of Blood Katana, a weapon in the 2022 video game Elden Ring
- River of Blood (2024), a 2024 Danish horror film

== Speeches ==
- Rivers of Blood speech by Enoch Powell in 1968
- "Rivers of Blood" speech by Saif Gaddafi in 2011; see LSE–Gaddafi affair

== Other ==
- Plagues of Egypt, in the Book of Exodus, describes the Nile becoming a river of blood
- Phlegethon, a river in Greek mythology, later adapted by Dante's Inferno
- River of Blood, an event during the Battle of Ullais in 633
- Mzilikazi (1790–1868), Southern African king whose name means "the great river of blood"
- A historical marker at Trump National Golf Club Washington, D.C. asserts that the deaths of "many" soldiers at a certain spot on the Potomac River during the American Civil War caused the water to become known as "The River of Blood."

== See also ==
- Blood in the River (disambiguation)
- Blood River (disambiguation)
- Kuruthipunal (disambiguation), translated from Tamil as "river of blood"
