= Blood River (disambiguation) =

Blood River is a river in South Africa.

Blood River may also refer to:

- Blood River (2009 film), a psychological thriller film
- Blood River (1991 film), an American TV film
- Blood River (TV series), 2025 Chinese television series
- Battle of Blood River, a battle on the bank of the river in 1838
- Blood River: A Journey to Africa's Broken Heart, a 2007 book by Tim Butcher
- "Blood Rivers", song by Glass Beach from The First Glass Beach Album

== See also ==
- Blood in the River (disambiguation)
- River of Blood (disambiguation)
