= Kuruthipunal =

Kuruthipunal (lit. 'River of Blood' in Tamil) may refer to:

- Kuruthipunal (novel), a novel by Indian writer Indira Parthasarathy
- Kuruthipunal (film), a 1995 Indian film by P. C. Sreeram

== See also ==
- River of Blood (disambiguation)
