= Wake of a Nation =

EP by Zeal & Ardor
- Released: 23 October 2020
- Recorded: 2020
- Genre: Avant-garde metal, black metal
- Length: 17:03
- Label: MVKA

Zeal & Ardor chronology
Live in London (2019)	Wake of a Nation (2020)	Zeal & Ardor (2022)

Singles from Wake of a Nation
- 1. "I Can't Breathe / Vigil" Released: 4 September 2020; 2. "Tuskegee" Released: 26 September 2020; 3. "Trust No One" Released: 11 October 2020; 4. "Wake of a Nation" Released: 19 October 2020

Professional ratings
Review scores
Source	Rating
Album Der Woche	7.9/10
The Circle Pit	9/10
Noizze	9/10
Rock Sins	9/10

Wake of a Nation is the first extended play by avant-garde metal band Zeal & Ardor.

== Background ==
Vocalist Manuel Gagneux wrote the songs in direct response to the murder of George Floyd earlier in 2020. Gagneux explained the EP in the announcement:

‘Wake Of A Nation‘’s intent and context should be obvious. I like to revel in ambiguity and in room for interpretation. This is not the case here. These 6 songs are a knee jerk reaction to what has happened to my fellow people in the last months. Originally I was set to record an album scheduled to come out next year. As these songs were written due to the horrendous events that instilled them I decided to release them as soon as possible. Using the rich heritage and culture as a part of my musical identity it felt like cowardice to sit by and continue with my routine as if nothing happened. This record is for Michael Brown, Eric Garner, George Floyd and the countless untold and nameless killed. It is for the brave souls willing to take a stand and ready to risk their own wellbeing so that others may have theirs intact.

== Artwork ==
The album artwork features two police batons in the shape of an inverted cross.

== Composition ==
The album features elements of Black metal, soul, blackgaze, gothic rock, electronica, post-rock, and post-dubstep.

"Vigil" is a soul styled piano-driven track, featuring the lyrics "“I can’t breathe, it’s a cellphone, please don’t shoot". "Tuskegee" is about the Tuskegee Syphilis Study and is a black metal styled track. "At The Seams" features piano and has been described as post-rock.

"I Can't Breathe", named after the dying words of Eric Garner, is an interlude that samples sounds from protests, news reports, and cellphone footage of black Americans being killed, over a "ominously bluesy" instrumental. "Trust No One" has been described as having "dynamic shifting between subdued passages and exuberant explosions" as the song changes between clean and unclean vocals. The vocals on the song have been compared to those of blackgaze band Deafheaven. "Wake of a Nation" features chanting of "dies irae", Latin for "Day of Wrath".

== Track listing ==
All tracks are written by Manuel Gagneux.

No.	Title	Length
1.	"Vigil"	3:10
2.	"Tuskegee"	3:48
3.	"At The Seams"	3:09
4.	"I Can't Breathe"	1:17
5.	"Trust No One"	3:07
6.	"Wake Of A Nation"	2:31
Total length:		19:02

== Personnel ==
Zeal & Ardor

- Manuel Gagneux - vocals, guitars, keyboards, art design
- Marco von Allmen - drums
- Marc Obrist - recording production

Production

- Will Putney - mixing, mastering
- Noé Herrmann - art design
