= Live in London (Zeal & Ardor album) =

2019 live album by Zeal & Ardor

Live album by Zeal & Ardor
- Released: 22 March 2019
- Recorded: 2 December 2018
- Genre: Black metal
- Length: 79:27
- Label: MVKA

Zeal & Ardor chronology
Stranger Fruit (2018)	Live in London (2019)	Wake of a Nation (2020)

Professional ratings
Review scores
Source	Rating
Already Heard	4/5 stars
Bring The Noise UK	2/5 stars
Distorted Sound	4/5 stars
Ghost Cult Magazine	4.5/5 stars
Outburn Online	5/5 stars
Rock Sins	4.5/5 stars

Live in London is the first live release by avant-garde metal band Zeal & Ardor. Released 22 March 2019, the performance captured was from a 2 December 2018 show at Electric Ballroom in London. The live album features three non-album tracks performed by the band as part of their setlist. Vocalist Manuel Gagneux stated of the album "Since we're really proud of our performance, we are releasing the entire show consisting of our entire catalogue of songs." Gagneux also stated the reason for the live album was to capture the live shows that were "more energetic and way more aggressive" than the recorded material.

"Baphomet", previously only available on the 2017 Adult Swim singles series, was released as a promotional single on 9 February 2019.

== Track listing ==
All tracks are written by Manuel Gagneux

No.	Title	Length
1.	"Sacrilegium I"	2:10
2.	"In Ashes"	3:43
3.	"Servants"	3:37
4.	"Come On Down"	3:27
5.	"Blood In The River"	3:47
6.	"Row Row"	3:36
7.	"You Ain't Coming Back"	3:28
8.	"We Never Fall"	3:58
9.	"Waste"	3:29
10.	"Fire Of Motion"	2:39
11.	"Hold Your Head Low"	4:55
12.	"Ship On Fire"	4:13
13.	"Stranger Fruit"	3:43
14.	"Cut Me"	2:58
15.	"Coagula"	1:46
16.	"Gravedigger's Chant"	3:26
17.	"Children's Summon"	3:15
18.	"Built On Ashes"	4:35
19.	"We Can't Be Found"	5:23
20.	"Don't You Dare"	4:12
21.	"Devil Is Fine"	3:53
22.	"Baphomet"	3:14
Total length:		79:27

== Personnel ==
Zeal & Ardor

- Manuel Gagneux – lead vocals and guitars, art design
- Tiziano Volante – guitars
- Marco von Allmen – drums, photography
- Marc Obrist – backing vocals, live production
- Denis Wagner – backing vocals
- Mia Rafaela Dieu – bass

Production

- Zebo Adam – production
- Kurt Ballou – mixing
- Alan Douches – mastering
- Noé Herrmann – art design
