= The National Student =

- Type: Online magazine with print supplements
- Format: Online magazine
- Owner(s): Defender Newspapers / Big Choice Group
- Editor: James Thornhill; Camille Dupont; Lucy Miller
- Founded: 2002
- Ceased publication: August 2019
- Country: United Kingdom
- Website: www.thenationalstudent.com

The National Student was a national print and online magazine for higher education students in the United Kingdom. It was launched as a print newspaper and online publication in 2002 by James Thornhill. A trial issue appeared in 2003, with the first full edition of 100,000 copies being published in February 2004.

In 2010, The National Student became part of Big Choice Group where James Thornhill remained as editor in chief until his departure in 2017. The publication was then edited by Camille Dupont, with Lucy Miller as editor-at-large, supported by a team of section editors.

Stories were produced by unpaid students or young graduates with a salaried editorial team for each section. There were two editors for each section, the editor-in-chief and an assistant editor. These editors worked together to manage a team of student writers who were based at universities all around the UK. The largest section was Student News, which was edited by Teuta Hoxha and Hannah Crofts.

The National Student Magazine was first launched as a culture supplement to the main newspaper in 2006, and returned as a termly supplement of The National Student in 2016. It was distributed on university campuses around the UK each September and April, with a travel-focused edition in January.

The website and magazine closed in 2019.
