= Zeal & Ardor =

Swiss avant-garde metal band

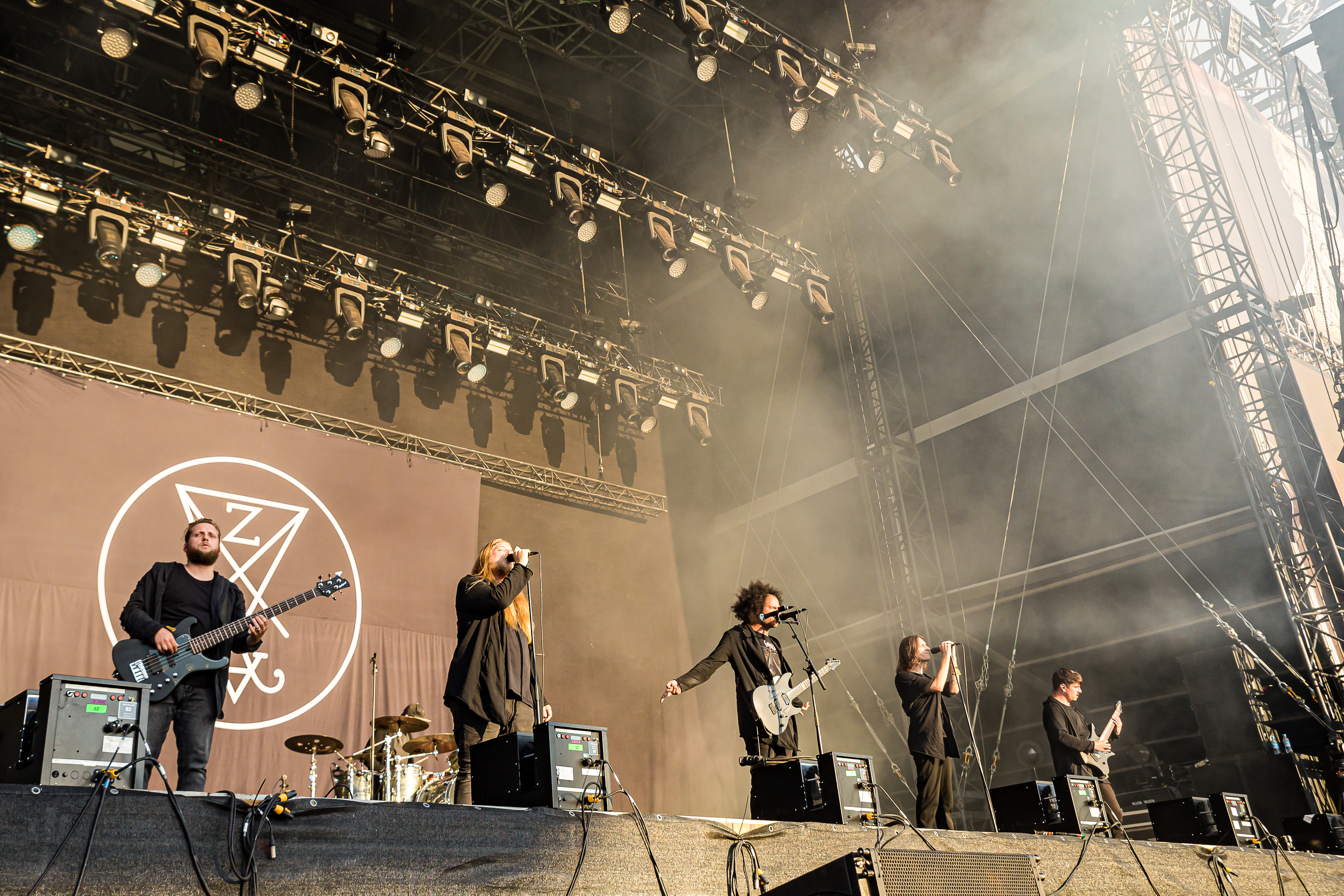
- Zeal & Ardor in 2022

Background information
- Origin: Basel, Switzerland / New York City
- Genres: Avant-garde metal; black metal; neo-soul
- Years active: 2013–present
- Labels: MVKA, Radicalis, Sub Pop
- Members: Manuel Gagneux; Denis Wagner; Marc Obrist; Tiziano Volante; Marco von Allmen; Lukas Kurmann
- Past members: Mia Rafaela Dieu
- Website: www.zealandardor.com

Zeal & Ardor is a Swiss avant-garde metal band started and led by Manuel Gagneux, a Swiss-American musician who had previously created a chamber pop project called Birdmask. Formed in 2013, the band mixes sounds of African-American spirituals with black metal.

Initially a solo project, the band signed with MVKA Records in 2016 and expanded to a full lineup, with Gagneux on vocals and guitar, backing vocalists Denis Wagner and Marc Obrist, guitarist Tiziano Volante, bassist Mia Rafaela Dieu, drummer Marco Von Allmen. Dieu was later replaced by Lukas Kurmann. Zeal & Ardor have released the albums Devil Is Fine (2016), Stranger Fruit (2018), Zeal & Ardor (2022), and Greif (2024), as well as a demo album Zeal and Ardor (2014). In 2020, they released their first EP, Wake of a Nation.

== History ==
=== Background ===
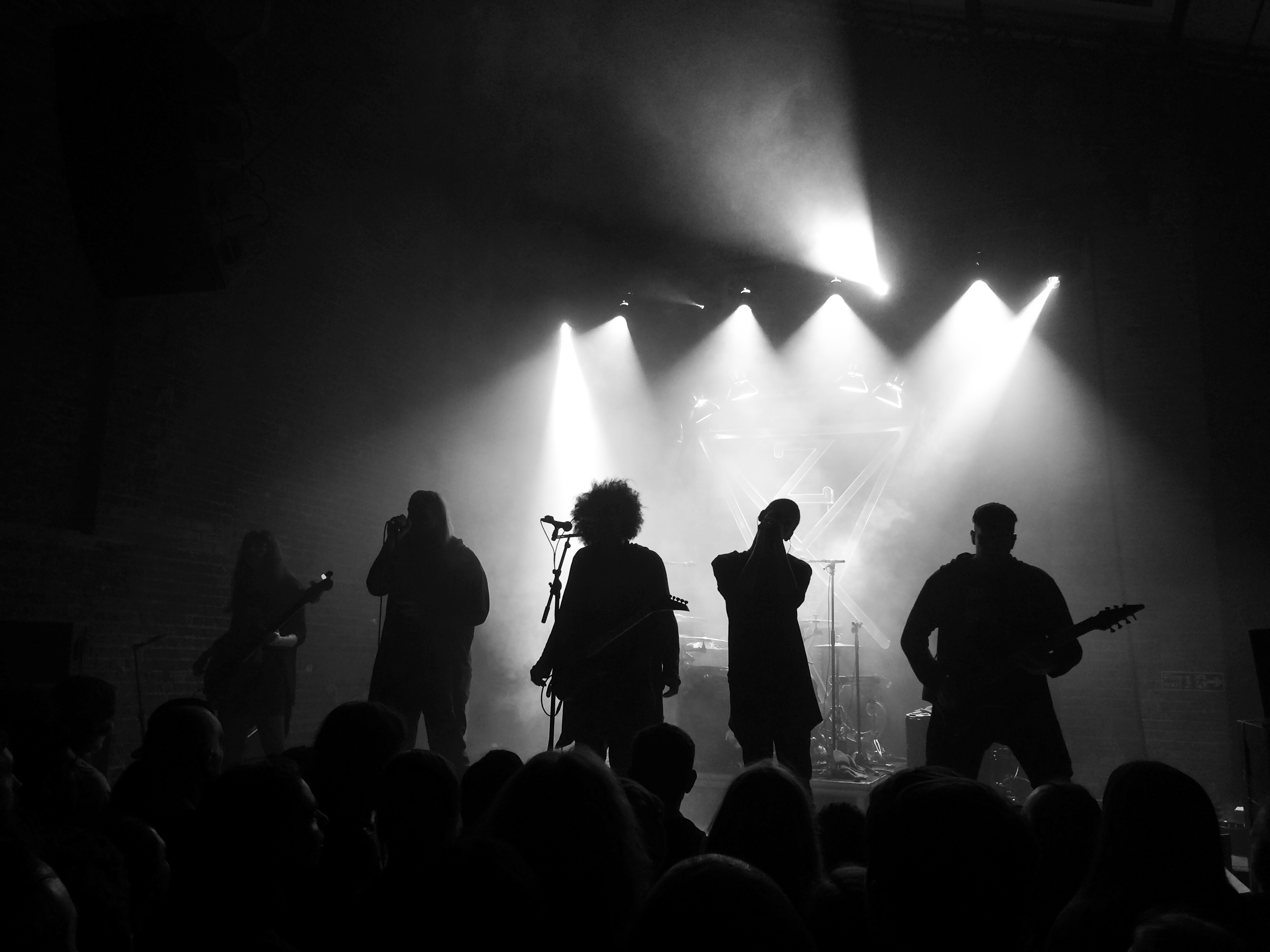
Zeal & Ardor in June 2018

Gagneux was born in Basel, Switzerland, in 1989 to an African American mother and a Swiss father. Both of Gagneux's parents were musicians, and he learned piano at an early age. Growing up, he frequently listened to grindcore and technical and melodic death metal artists. As a teenager, he was in a Crossover band named Hellalujah. After moving to New York City in 2012, Gagneux started Birdmask, a chamber pop project. (Note: Since starting Zeal & Ardor, Gagneux still occasionally releases music as Birdmask, as well as electronic project GEIZ.)

Gagneux posted his Birdmask music to 4chan "to get feedback because they're brutally honest and don't give a shit about you". He would ask users for two musical genres to combine and create a song in half an hour as an experiment to expand his creativity. One of these users suggested that he fuse "black metal", while another suggested "nigger music"; in response, he started Zeal & Ardor, which features elements of both black metal and slave songs. Other genres suggested included "Afro Djent, Nashville Power Electronics and Industrial Grunge". Gagneux later stated the band came from the question of "what if American slaves had embraced Satan instead of Jesus?".

=== Self-titled release and Devil Is Fine (2014–2016) ===
The project's first release was a work in progress of a song called "A Spiritual", released on SoundCloud on December 13, 2013. Gagneux self-released the demo album Zeal and Ardor to Bandcamp in June 2014.

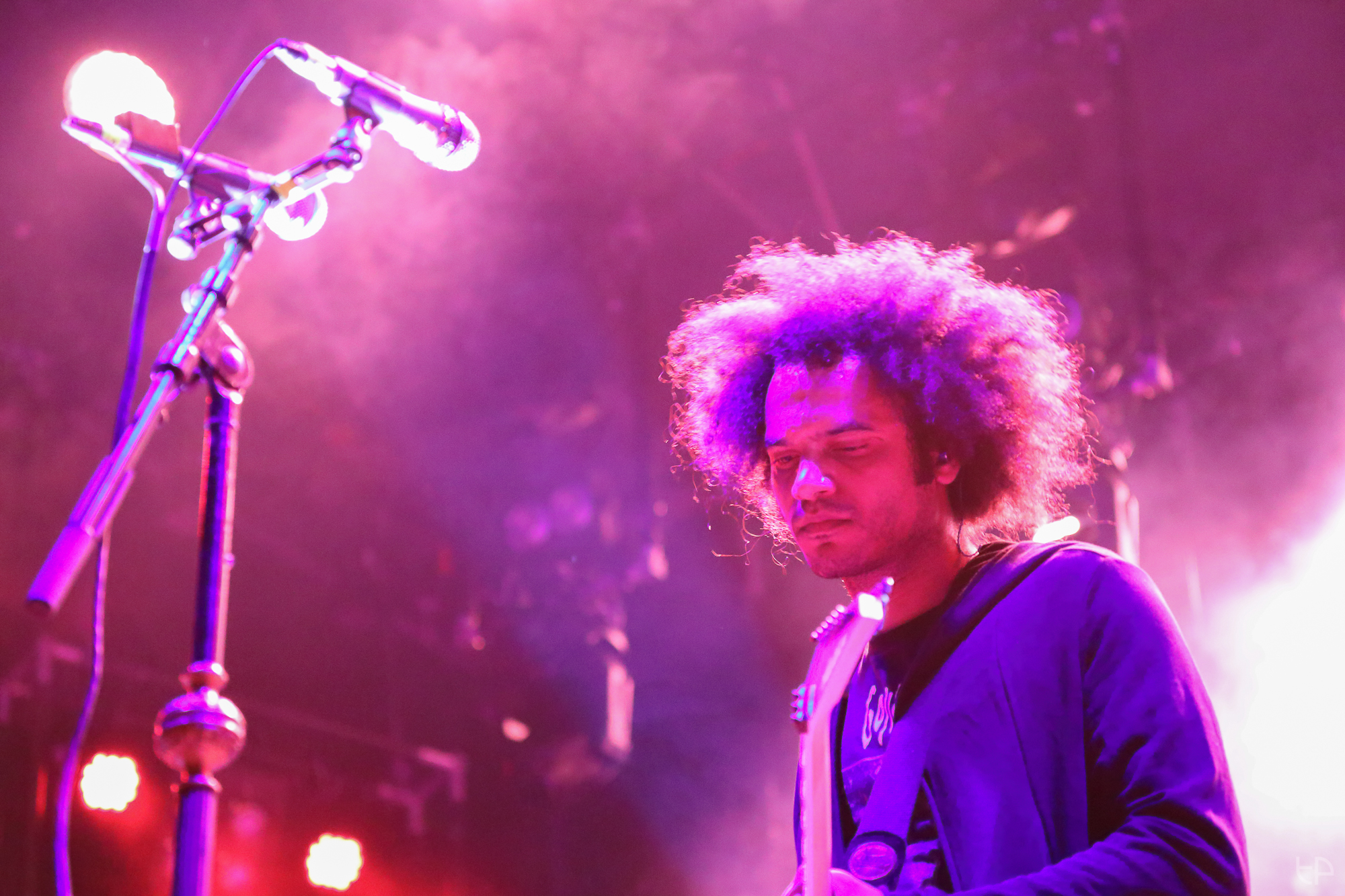
Vocalist and guitarist Manuel Gagneux

The project's official debut album, Devil Is Fine, was first released on Bandcamp on April 15, 2016. Gagneux wrote and recorded the album himself. In November 2016, the band was featured in an article written by Bandcamp about black experimental metal. In June 2016, Rolling Stone featured Devil Is Fine as one of the "Best Metal Records of 2016 So Far".

On November 11, 2016, Gagneux announced his signing with the UK-based record company MVKA. The lead single, "Devil Is Fine", had a music video released on December 15, 2016. A second single, "Come On Down", was released on January 16, 2017. MKVA re-released Devil Is Fine on February 24, 2017. It charted at 17 on the Swiss Hitparade charts.

=== Expansion to full band and Stranger Fruit (2017–2019) ===
In 2017, the project became a full-fledged band with the addition of backing vocalists Denis Wagner and Marc Obrist, guitarist Tiziano Volante, bassist Mia Rafaela Dieu, and drummer Marco Von Allmen. Gagneux formed the full band after promoter Walter Hoeijmakers asked him to play at the Roadburn Festival. They opened for Prophets of Rage for two shows in London and Germany in 2017.

Zeal & Ardor offered a unique merchandise deal during their 2018 shows, and fans could get free merchandise if they branded the band's logo on their skin. Eight people took up the offer, with Gagneux saying, "The intent was that no one would ever do it. Because that's the whole thing: you don't want this brand. If you do, you're just an idiot who is following, not thinking for yourself. If they want to underline my statement, that's fine with me. But eight people is enough. If they don't get the symbolism, let's not encourage them.."

The next album, Stranger Fruit, was released on June 8, 2018. It was preceded by the singles "Gravedigger's Chant", "Waste", and "Built On Ashes".

In June 2018, the band's song "Devil Is Fine" from Devil Is Fine was featured in a trailer for the upcoming video game The Division 2. In February 2019, the band announced "Live in London", a live album released on March 22.

=== Wake of a Nation and Zeal & Ardor (2020–2023) ===
In September and October 2020, the band released five of the six songs from their first EP, Wake of a Nation, which was announced alongside the first two singles for release on October 23 of the same year. Gagneux wrote the songs in direct response to the murder of George Floyd earlier in 2020. Gagneux explained the EP in the announcement:

"Wake Of A Nation"'s intent and context should be obvious. I like to revel in ambiguity and in room for interpretation. This is not the case here. These 6 songs are a knee jerk reaction to what has happened to my fellow people in the last months. Originally I was set to record an album scheduled to come out next year. As these songs were written due to the horrendous events that instilled them I decided to release them as soon as possible. Using the rich heritage and culture as a part of my musical identity it felt like cowardice to sit by and continue with my routine as if nothing happened. This record is for Michael Brown, Eric Garner, George Floyd and the countless untold and nameless killed. It is for the brave souls willing to take a stand and ready to risk their own wellbeing so that others may have theirs intact.

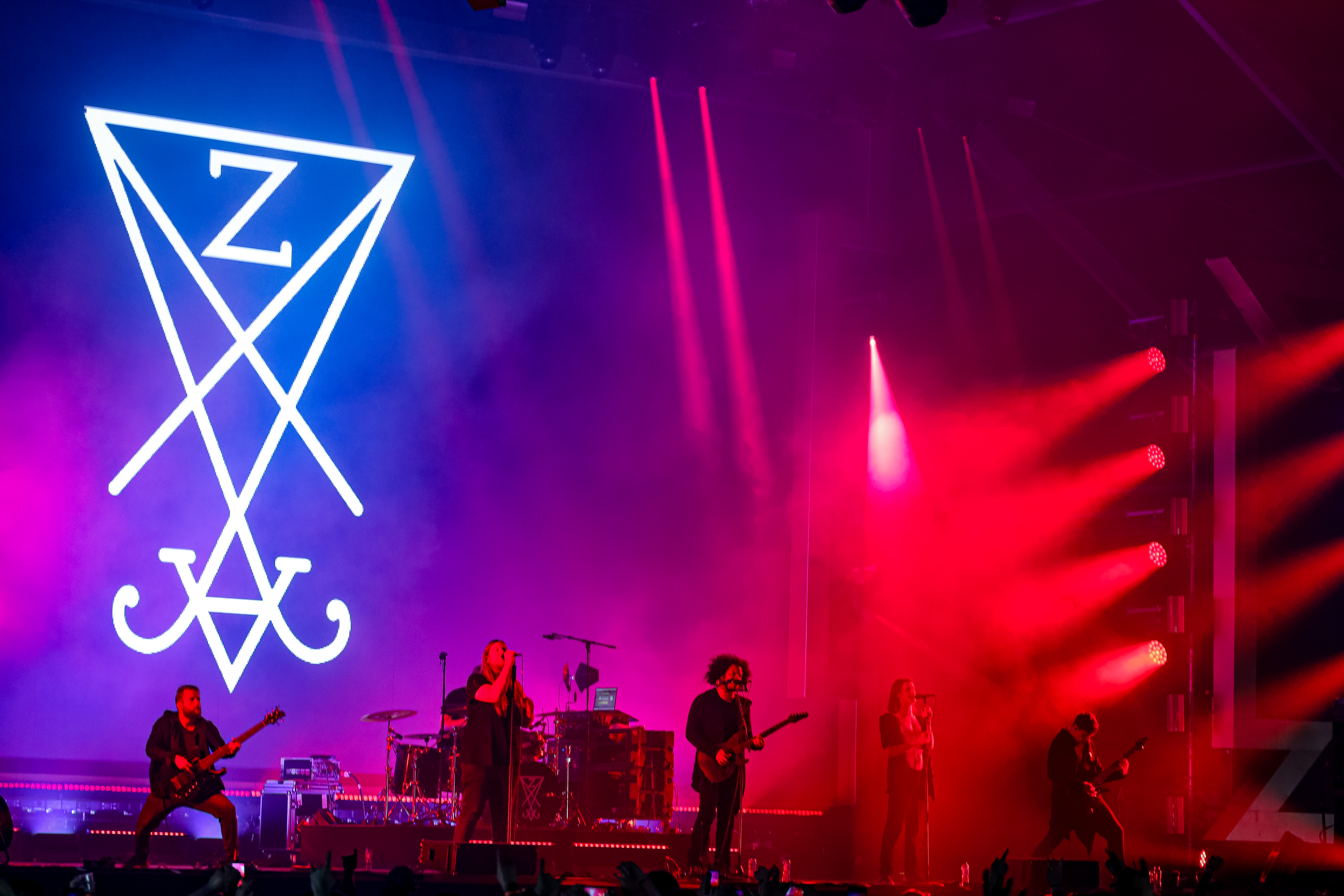
Zeal & Ardor in June 2022 at Graspop Metal Meeting

On May 25, 2021, the group released "Run", the first single off their upcoming self-titled third studio album. A second single, "Erase", was released on July 23. On September 1, 2021, a third single, "Bow", was released. A fourth single, "Götterdämmerung", was released on October 15. The song is sung mainly in German and described by Gagneux as "our most bare-bones song yet. No gimmicks, no frills, no distractions, just rage." The self-titled album was released on February 11, 2022. On November 6, they performed a livestream concert from Museum Tinguely in Switzerland. A fifth single, "Golden Liar", was released on December 1.

=== Greif (2024-present) ===
The band's fourth album Greif was announced on April 22, 2024. The first single "to my ilk" was released alongside the release date of August 23. The album will be their first recorded as a full band. The second single "Clawing Out" was released on May 24. The third single "Fend You Off" was released on June 22.

== Tours and festival appearances ==
In June 2018, the band announced a North American tour with Astronoid's support and a solo European tour. In 2019, they toured in support of Baroness and Deafheaven. During the later part of the 2019 tour, bassist Mia Rafaela Dieu missed several shows due to gastroparesis caused by Ehlers–Danlos syndrome. She was replaced by Lukas Kurmann. 2021 saw the band commence tour opening for Opeth and Mastodon. The band toured alongside Meshuggah in Europe in late 2021 and early 2022 before embarking on their headline tour through the UK and Europe in late 2022.

Zeal & Ardor have performed at many festivals, including the 2018 Montreux Jazz Festival. Download Festival, Lowlands, by:Larm, Musilac Music Festival, Primavera Sound, Wacken Open Air, Hellfest, Graspop Metal Meeting, Le Guess Who?, Copenhell, Eurosonic Noorderslag, Devilstone Open Air, and Reading and Leeds Festivals, among others.

== Musical style and influences ==
"Waste"
Sample of "Waste" from Stranger Fruit. The song demonstrates the band's mixture of soul and gospel with black metal.

Devil Is Fine features elements of soul, black metal, Delta Blues, folk, gospel as well as jazz and lo-fi influences. Several instrumental tracks feature electronic and drum and bass features. The band frequently utilizes tremolo guitar and blast beats.

Stranger Fruit retains many elements of the first album, including Avant-garde metal, post-black metal and aspects of Motown music and blues. Zeal & Ardor retains many elements of the previous albums including industrial metal and blackgaze influences.

The band is influenced by artists such as Mayhem, Burzum, Darkthrone, Wendy Carlos, Tom Waits, Golem, Portishead, Naglfar, and Iron Maiden, as well as nu-metal bands such as Deftones and Limp Bizkit, who Gagneux states are his "guilty pleasures". Gagneux also lists writers Philip K. Dick and Octavia Butler as influences on his music.

== Band members ==
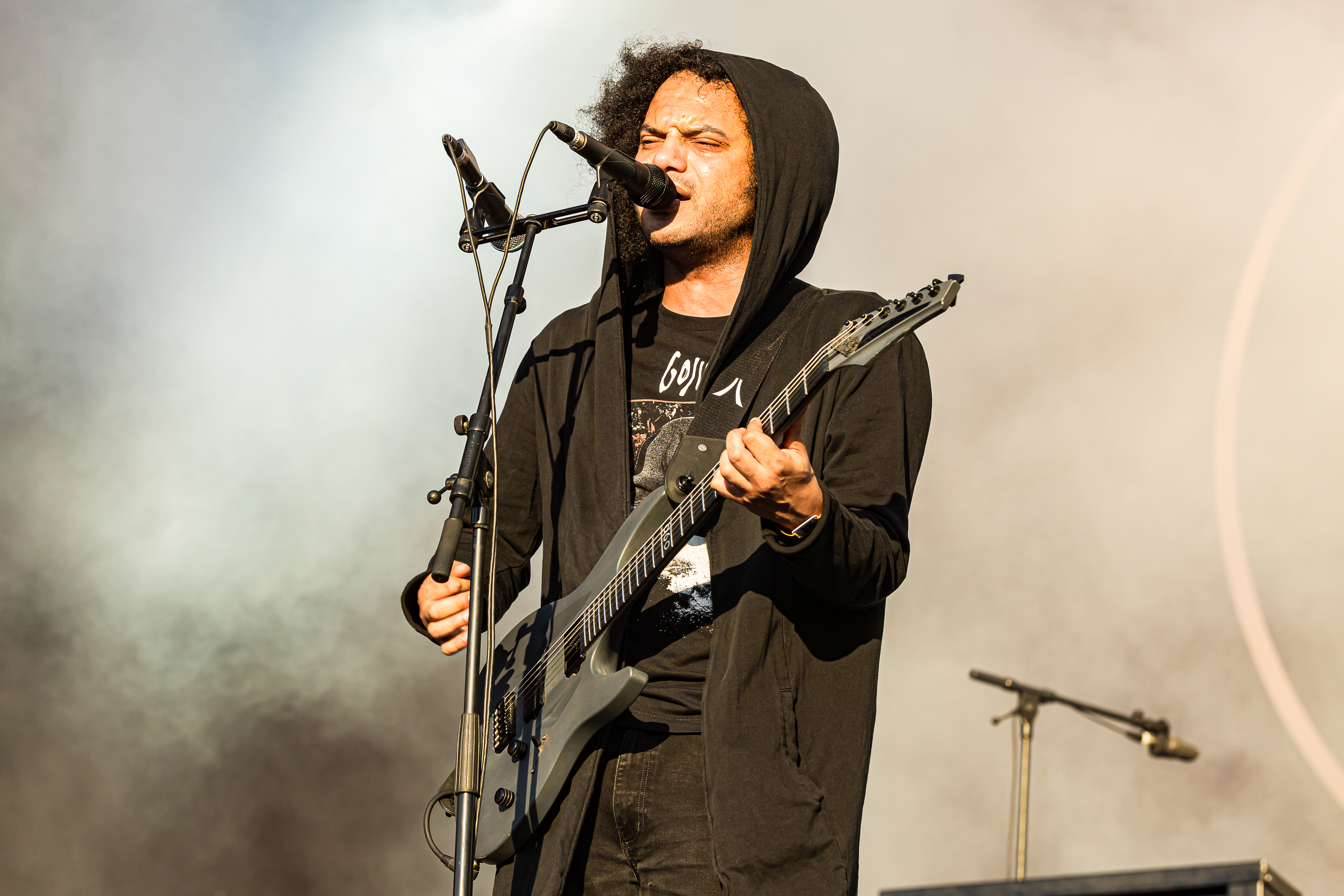
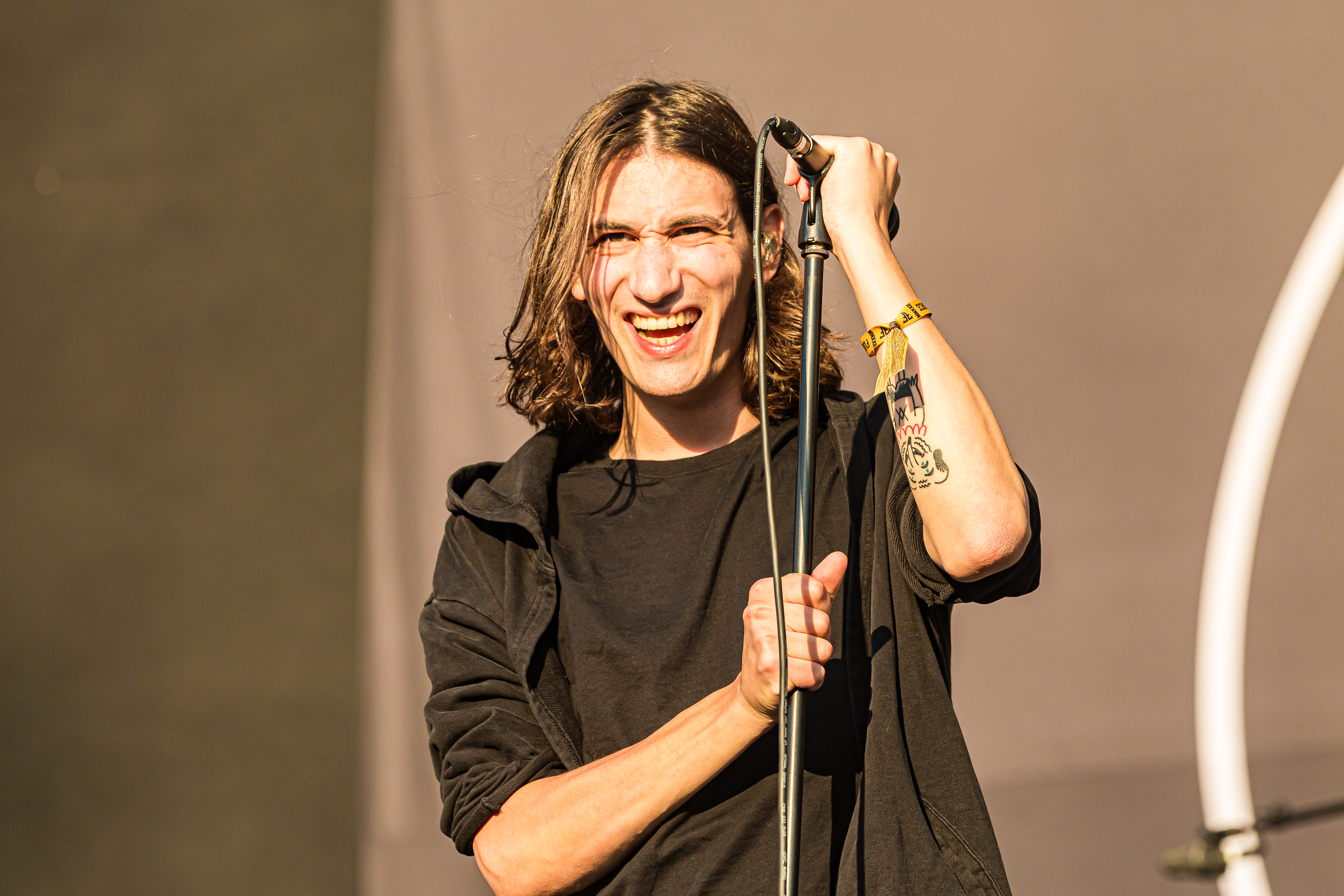
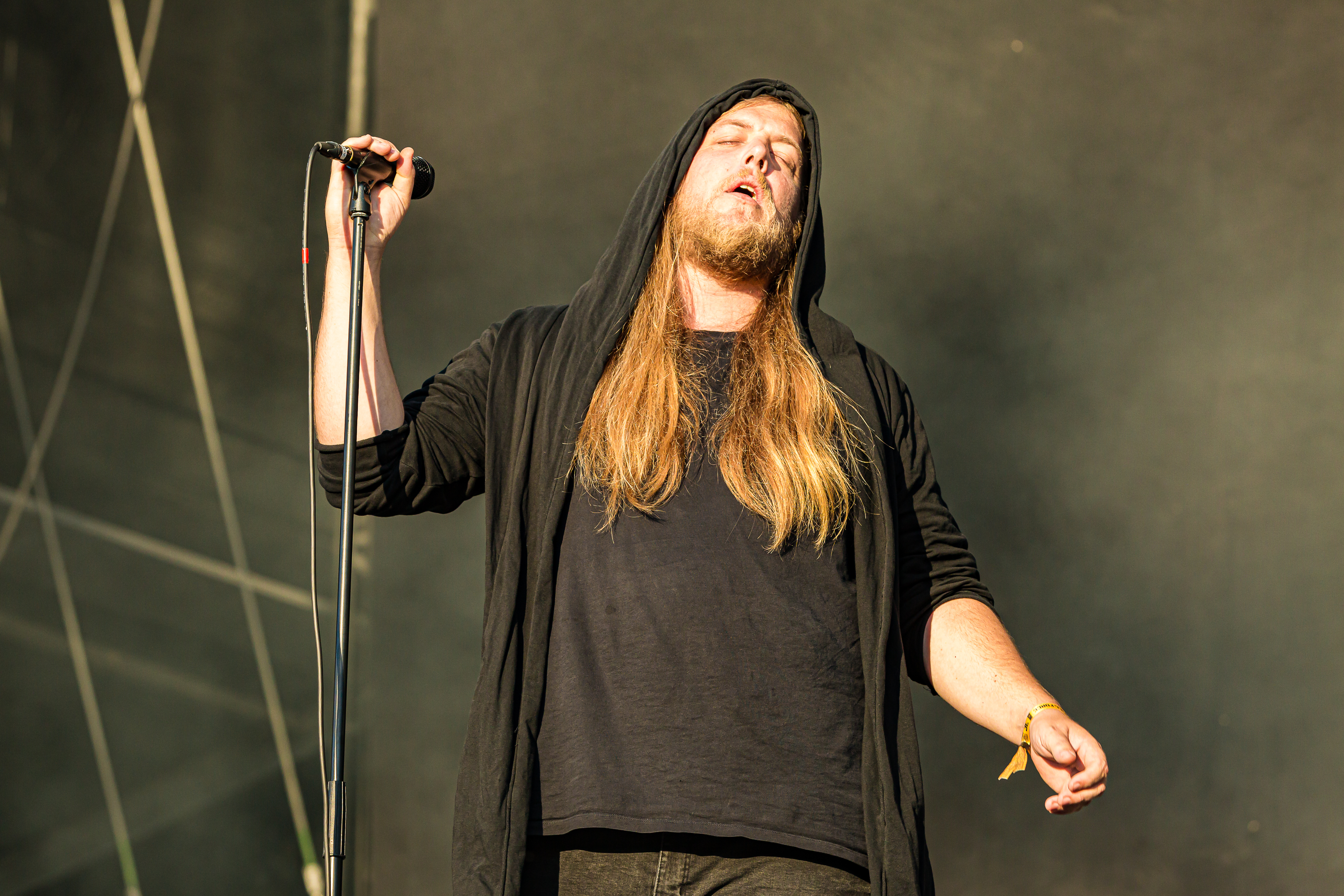
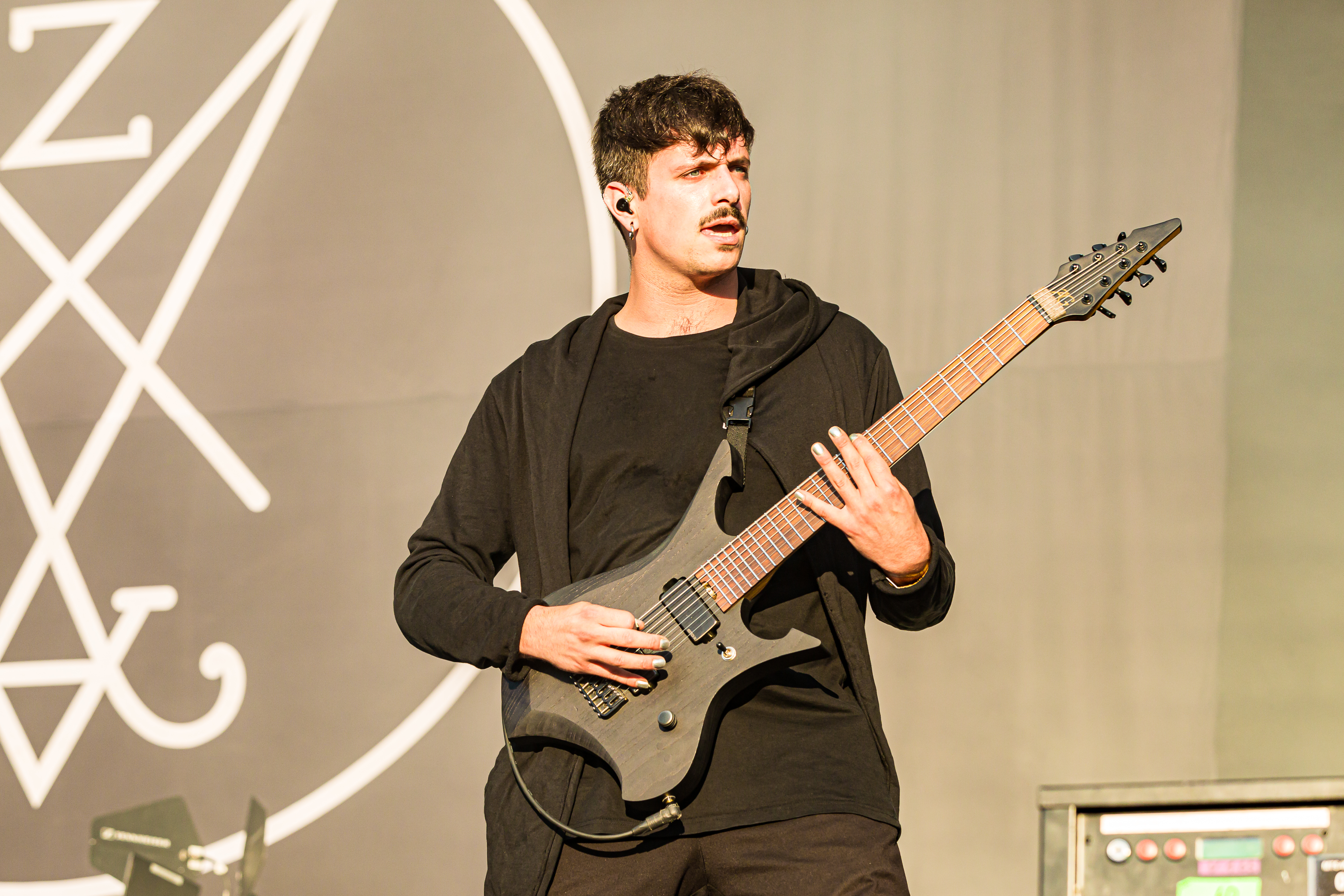
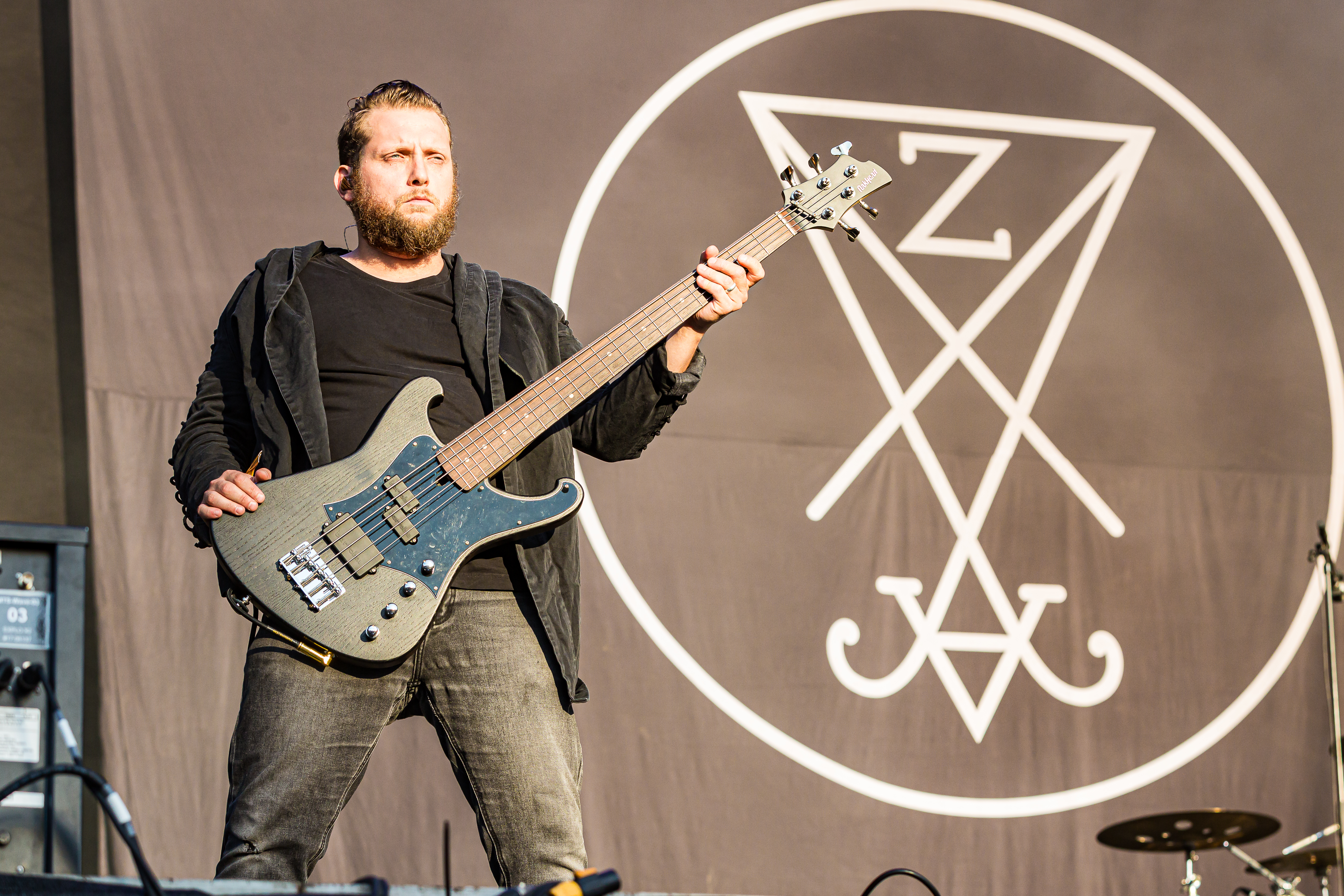
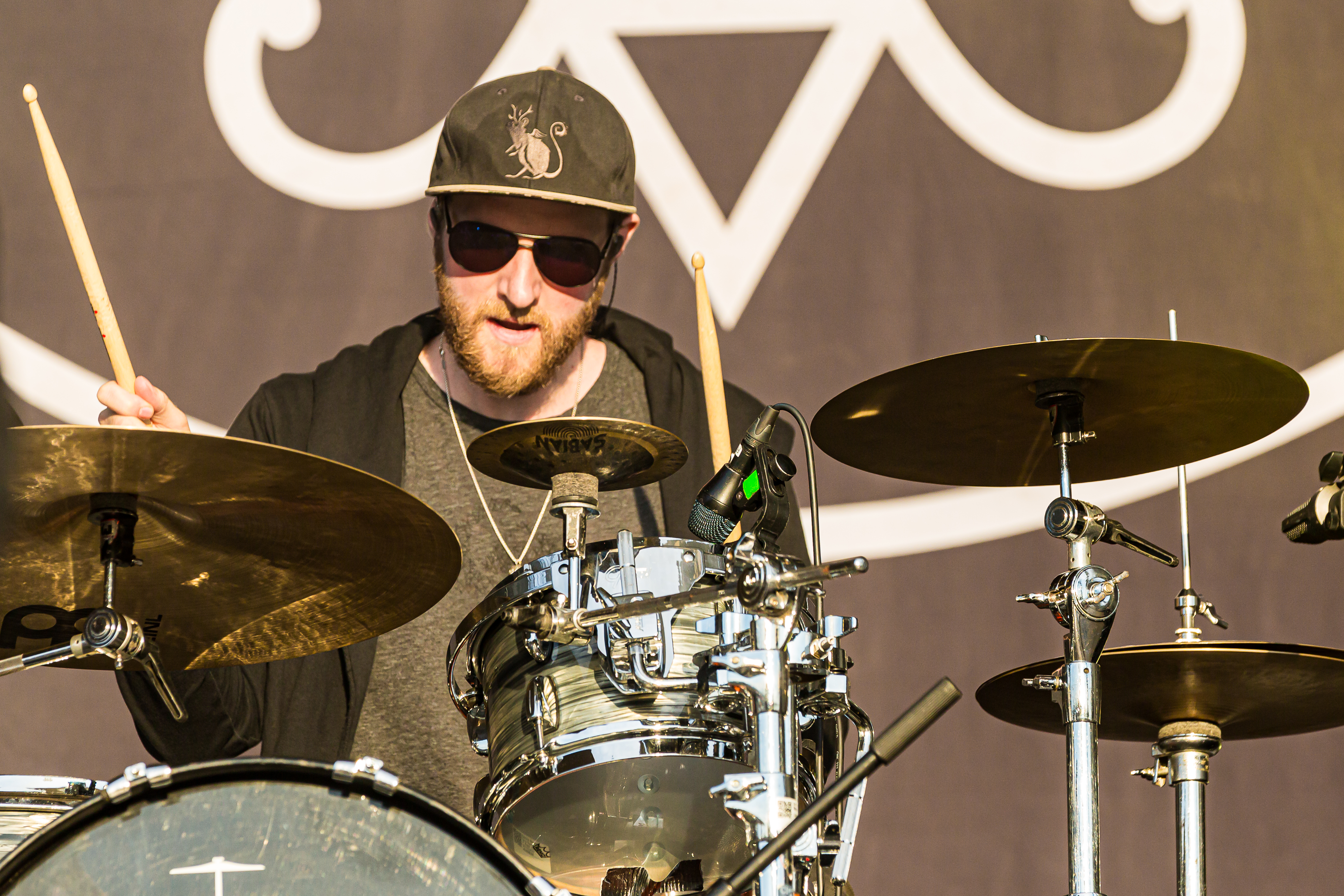
(from left to right) Gagneux, Wagner, Obrist, Volante, Kurmann, Von Allmen - Zeal & Ardor in 2022

Current members

- Manuel Gagneux – lead vocals, guitars, keyboards, synthesizer, programming (2013–present)
- Denis Wagner – backing vocals (2017–present)
- Marc Obrist – backing vocals, production (2017–present)
- Tiziano Volante – rhythm guitar, lead guitar (2017–present)
- Lukas Kurmann – bass (2019–present)
- Marco Von Allmen – drums (2017–present)

Former members

- Mia Rafaela Dieu – bass (2017–2019)

== Timeline ==
-Most Zeal & Ardor releases feature Von Allmen on drums with Gagneux performing every other instrument, until 2024's Greif which was written and recorded as a full band.

== Discography ==
- Devil Is Fine (2016)
- Stranger Fruit (2018)
- Zeal & Ardor (2022)
- Greif (2024)

== Awards and nominations ==
Year	Award	Category	Nominee	Result
2017	Basler Pop-Preis	Basler Pop-Preis, Jury	Zeal & Ardor	Won
2017	Heavy Music Awards	Best Breakthrough Band	Zeal & Ardor	Nominated
2017	Loudwire Music Awards	Best New Artist	Zeal & Ardor	Nominated
2017	Metal Hammer Golden Gods Awards	Best New Band	Zeal & Ardor	Nominated
2018	Swiss Music Awards	Best Live Act	Zeal & Ardor	Nominated
2018	AIM Independent Music Awards	International Breakthrough of the Year	Zeal & Ardor	Nominated
2020	Basler Pop-Preis	Basler Pop-Preis, Jury	Zeal & Ardor	Won
2024	Swiss Music Prize	Music	Zeal & Ardor	Won
