= Greif (album) =

Studio album by Zeal & Ardor
- Released: 23 August 2024
- Genre: Black metal, avant-garde metal
- Length: 42:29
- Label: Redacted
- Producer: Manuel Gagneux

Zeal & Ardor chronology
Zeal & Ardor (2022)	Greif (2024)

Singles from Zeal & Ardor
- 1. "To My Ilk" Released: 22 April 2024; 2. "Clawing Out" Released: 24 May 2024; 3. "Fend You Off" Released: 21 June 2024; 4. "Hide in Shade" Released: 19 July 2024

Greif is the fourth studio album by avant-garde metal band Zeal & Ardor, released on 23 August 2024. It is the first album they recorded as full band.

== Background ==
While Zeal & Ardor began as a one-man project by Manuel Gagneux, Greif is the first album to be written and recorded by a full band, while expanding beyond the act's "black metal meets spirituals" roots. Reviewers also noted the album's experimentation with styles ranging from funk to alternative rock to classic rock.

The album's title was inspired by a carnival creature called Der Vogel Greif that Gagneux observed in his hometown of Basel, Switzerland. Gagneux decided to include the full Zeal & Ardor live band in the album's creation in return for their years of service while touring behind the group's previous albums.

== Critical reception ==
Professional ratings
Review scores
Source	Rating
Distorted Sound	9/10
Kerrang!	4/5 stars
Metal Hammer	4.5/5 stars
Metal Storm	5.8/10
Blabbermouth	7.5/10
Wall of Sound	9.5/10
Metal Injection	6/10

The album received generally positive reviews, but with some reservations when compared to previous Zeal & Ardor albums. Kerrang! noted that the album is less heavy and aggressive than the band's previous works, though "it goes further and deeper than anything Zeal & Ardor have done before." Blabbermouth called the album "Diverse, daring and occasionally wasteful with its charms."

Distorted Sound concluded that "While you won’t find as much raw savagery" as on the band's previous album, "you will continue to experience the brilliant level of craftmanship [sic] which has been so ridiculously consistent through Zeal & Ardor's catalogue." Metal Hammer praised the album as "the sound of a band seeking to reinvent themselves and innovate beyond their roots," but noted that "by expanding their remit, the laser focus of the previous records is naturally lost."

A reviewer for Metal Storm also praised the album's attempts to expand on the band's previous sounds, but concluded that Greif suffers from "an excessive level of lethargy to the record, a lack of especially engaging and likeable songs, and a few too many moments that are likely to miss the mark." Metal Injection showed appreciation for the album's experimental mix of styles within the band's avant-garde metal roots, but concluded that "the song composure and the hallmark passion of Zeal & Ardor just didn't come together on this release."

== Track listing ==
All tracks are written by Manuel Gagneux.

No.	Title	Length
1.	"The Bird, the Lion, and the Wildkin"	1:33
2.	"Fend You Off"	3:52
3.	"Kilonova"	4:07
4.	"Are You the Only One Now?"	4:26
5.	"Go Home My Friend"	1:56
6.	"Clawing Out"	3:42
7.	"Disease"	4:34
8.	"369"	0:55
9.	"Thrill"	2:27
10.	"une ville vide"	2:04
11.	"Sugarcoat"	2:58
12.	"Solace"	3:52
13.	"Hide in Shade"	3:38
14.	"To My Ilk"	2:25
Total length:		42:29

== Personnel ==
- Manuel Gagneux – lead vocals, backing vocals, lead guitar, rhythm guitar, bass, synthesizer, programming
- Marco Von Allmen – drums
- Denis Wagner – backing vocals
- Marc Obrist – backing vocals
- Tiziano Volante – rhythm guitar, lead guitar
- Lukas Kurmann – bass
