= Devil Is Fine =

Studio album by Zeal & Ardor
- Released: April 15, 2016 (original); February 24, 2017 (re-release)
- Genres: Avant-garde metal; melodic death metal; black metal
- Length: 24:37
- Labels: Self-released (original); MVKA, Reflections Records (2017)
- Producer: Manuel Gagneux

Zeal & Ardor chronology
Devil Is Fine (2016)	Stranger Fruit (2018)

Singles from Devil Is Fine
- 1. "Devil Is Fine" Released: November 17, 2016; 2. "Come On Down" Released: January 16, 2017

Devil Is Fine is the debut studio album by Swiss avant-garde metal musician Manuel Gagneux, under his alias Zeal & Ardor. Initially released independently in April 2016, it was re-released by MVKA records on March 27, 2017. The album received critical acclaim, and was included on many publications' year-end best of lists. A remastered version was released in 2026 called "Devil Is Fine X".

== Background ==
Gagneux started Zeal & Ardor in response to two messages left to him on 4chan by two different users. One of these users suggested that he fuse "black metal", while another suggested "nigger music"; in response, he started Zeal & Ardor, which features elements of both black metal and African-American spirituals. Gagneux later stated the band came from the question of "what if American slaves had embraced Satan instead of Jesus?". The album is a follow-up to Zeal & Ardor's 2014 self-released demo album Zeal and Ardor.

Devil Is Fine was first released on Bandcamp in 2016 and re-released by MVKA on February 24, 2017. Gagneux wrote and recorded the album himself. Gagneux was also inspired by Gestalt theoretical psychotherapy. Gagneux used a loud and clipping sound level to get a Lo-Fi retro quality to the recording.

Gagneux recorded the album on his laptop, using "a simple microphone". He plays all the instruments, and programmed the drums. "I only used bad equipment, but that was also an advantage" he said of the lo-fi recording methods.

A limited edition vinyl box set was released, featuring the album, stickers, a T-shirt, a pendant, pins and a poster, packaged in a wooden box. Limited white vinyl editions were also available. Both releases were handled through Reflections Records.

The song "Devil Is Fine" was used in a trailer for the second season of WGN's Underground, as well as in the first gameplay trailer for Tom Clancy's The Division 2.

== Album art ==
The album art, designed by Gagneux and Noé Herrmann, features a photograph of Robert Smalls, a slave who freed himself and 17 other slaves during the American Civil War by commandeering a Confederate transport ship. Superimposed over the image of Smalls is The Sigil of Lucifer, sometimes referred to as the Seal of Satan.

Gagneux described his reason behind the cover in a 2018 interview,

There's the embracing of the self and the ego, and being at peace with the fact that you have needs and wants, and the pursuit of those to a degree where you get as close to fulfilling yourself without stepping on other people's toes... That's why I chose Robert Smalls for the cover of the first album. He was very determined about what he wanted – freed himself, freed others, stole a ship, became a politician. It's pretty extreme.

== Song information ==
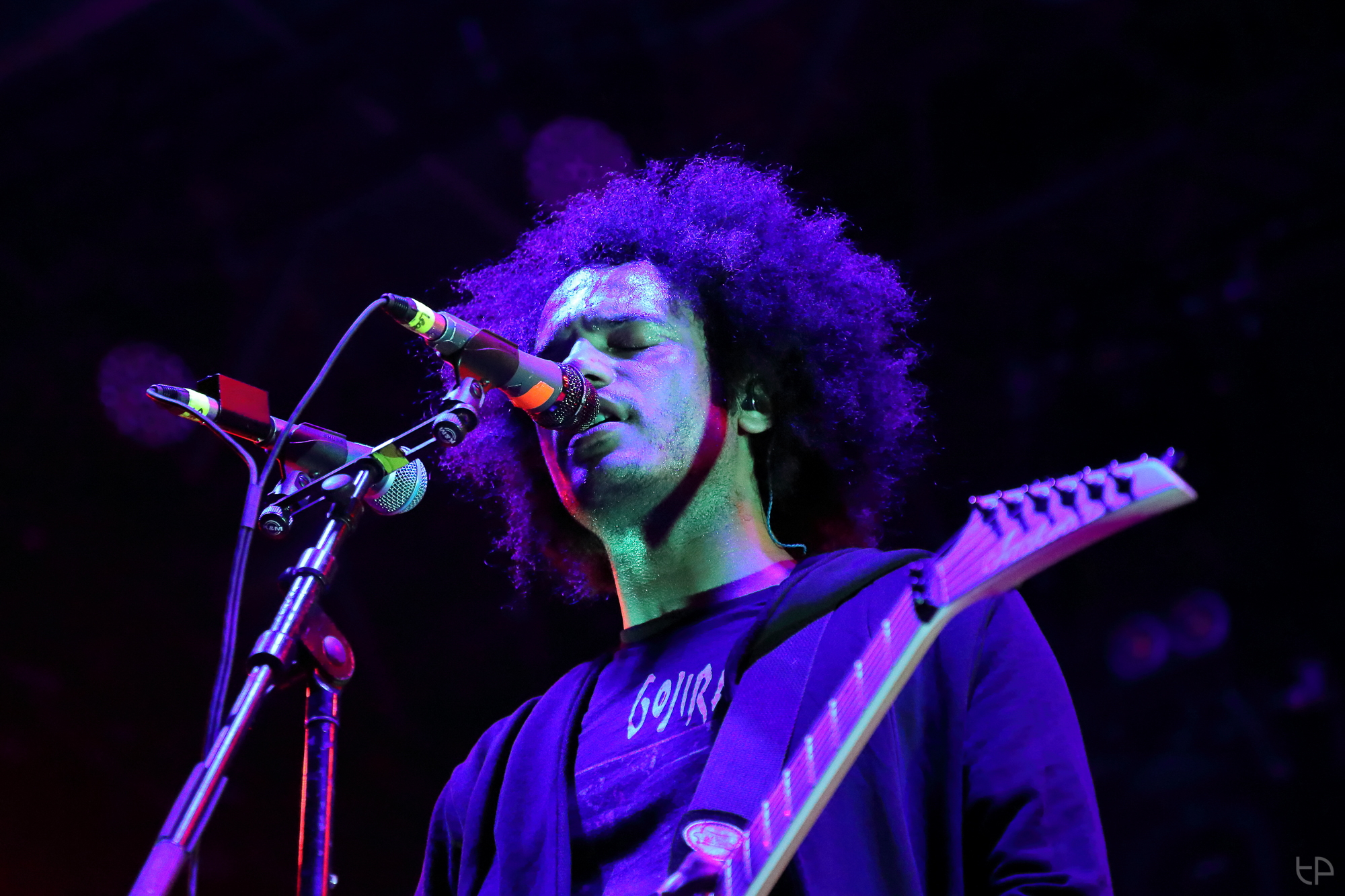
Manuel Gagneux composed and performed the album in its entirety.

"Devil Is Fine" features the lyrics "little one gotta heed my warning, devil is fine" and features the sound of clanking chains. The vocals are similar to the Delta blues style. "In Ashes" is described as "(blending) righteous hollering with blastbeats". "Come On Down" features tremolo guitar playing, and is described as having folk and gospel influences merged with black metal. "Children's Summon" features a refrain referencing the previous track, and lyrics about "going home to the flames".

"Blood in the River" features layered vocals and a lo-fi sound to emulate slaves singing. It features lyrics including "A good god is a dark one, a good god is the one that brings the fire." "What is a Killer Like You Gonna Do Here?" is described as having a "jazzy, vamping beat." It features lyrics that "both threatens and questions violence" and a slap bass sound.

The three "Sacrilegium" tracks on the album serve as interludes. "Sacrilegium I" is an electronic and drum and bass influenced track, "Sacrilegium II" and "Sacrilegium III" feature the sound of a music box and xylophone alongside synthesizers.

== Critical reception and commercial performance ==
Professional ratings
Review scores
Source	Rating
Already Heard	4.5/5 stars
Invicta Magazine	3/10
It Djents	6/10
Louder Sound	3.5/5 stars
Metal Storm	9.5/10
New Noise magazine	4/5 stars
The Soundboard	4/10
Spin	7/10
Stormbringer	4.5/5 stars
Uncivil Revolt	9/10

At release, Devil Is Fine received mostly positive reviews. Later on it received more critical acclaim, being placed on several publication's best of lists at the end of the year. Noisey ranked the album 6th on their top 100 albums of 2016 list. Metal Insider ranked the album 6th on their top 10 metal albums of 2016. Loudwire placed the album 6th on its ranking on the 25 best Metal Albums of 2017. Metal Hammer placed the album 5th on their top 100 albums of 2017 list.

Rolling Stone listed it as one of the best metal records (so far) of 2017 in a June review, stating "Arguably, nothing released this year is as strange, inscrutable or wonderful than Devil is Fine... Gagneux folds field recordings and soul samples, obsidian guitars and music box melodies, blastbeats and legitimate bass drops into a wild-eyed chimera. It is admittedly imperfect and unreasonable, with the genres sometimes spliced so haphazardly that the stitches show. It suggests, though, a dream world of infinite possibilities." Unwinnable named the album their metal album of the year in 2017.

In 2022, Metal Hammer described the album, stating “we’d heard nothing like it: centuries-old slave chants blasphemed by black metal tremolo, bubbling electronica, dusty blues, Gothenburg melodies, and baroque Nick Cave-iness.”

Before being re-released on a label, the album sold over 1000 copies on Bandcamp by the end of 2016.

The album charted #17 on the Swiss Hitparade charts.

=== Accolades ===
Publication	Accolade	Rank	Ref.
Noisey	Top 100 Albums of 2016	6	
Metal Insider	Top 10 Metal Albums of 2016	6	
Loudwire	Top 25 Metal Albums of 2017	6	
Metal Hammer	Top 100 Albums of 2017	5	
Unwinnable	Best Metal Albums of 2017	1	
Metal Assault	The Best Metal Albums of 2017	19	
Treble Zine	Top 66.6 Metal Albums of the Millennium	66.6	
Spin	25 Best Metal Songs of 2017: "Come On Down"	20	
CVLT Nation	Albums of the Year 2016	10	
WSOU Radio	Top 15 Metal Albums of 2017	15	
Kerrang!	Saw Law's top 10 Albums of 2017	1	
FreqsTV	Top 10 Albums of 2017	5	
The Haystack	Top 50 Metal Albums of 2017	6	
Medium	Nick Heisenberg's Favorite albums of 2017	2	

== Track listing ==
All tracks are written by Manuel Gagneux.

Devil Is Fine
No.	Title	Length
1.	"Devil Is Fine"	3:13
2.	"In Ashes"	2:39
3.	"Sacrilegium I"	2:00
4.	"Come on Down"	3:20
5.	"Children's Summon"	3:09
6.	"Sacrilegium II"	2:21
7.	"Blood in the River"	3:33
8.	"What Is a Killer Like You Gonna Do Here?"	2:15
9.	"Sacrilegium III"	2:44
Total length:		24:37

Devil Is Fine X bonus tracks
No.	Title	Length
1.	"Death of a Billion"	2:25
2.	"Intermezzo II"	1:37
3.	"Bellator Halli Rha"	2:56
4.	"The Lesser Key"	2:29
5.	"A Spiritual"	2:39

== Personnel ==
Zeal & Ardor

- Manuel Gagneux - lead vocals, backing vocals, lead guitar, rhythm guitar, bass, drum programming, samples, production, art design

Production

- Noé Herrmann - art design

== Chart performance ==
Chart (2017)	Peak position
Swiss Albums (Schweizer Hitparade)	17
