= Zeal & Ardor (album) =

Studio album by Zeal & Ardor
- Released: 11 February 2022
- Genre: Black metal, industrial metal, blackgaze
- Length: 43:57
- Label: MVKA
- Producer: Manuel Gagneux

Zeal & Ardor chronology
Wake of a Nation (2020)	Zeal & Ardor (2022)	Greif (2024)

Singles from Zeal & Ardor
- 1. "Run" Released: 25 May 2021; 2. "Erase" Released: 23 July 2021; 3. "Bow" Released: 1 September 2021; 4. "Götterdämmerung" Released: 15 October 2021; 5. "Golden Liar" Released: 1 December 2021; 6. "Church Burns" Released: 20 January 2022

Zeal & Ardor is the third studio album by avant-garde metal artist Zeal & Ardor, released on 11 February 2022.

== Track information ==
Lead singer Manuel Gagneux described the album, stating:

— Lyrically, it's a continuation of the alternate history narrative we have going on—what if American slaves had turned to Satan instead of God?—Where Devil Is Fine was about life in captivity and Stranger Fruit was about the escape this record is about the many things that come after. Being on the run, clandestine ruminations and grand plan."

Gagneux describes the opening track, "Zeal & Ardor" as "start(ing) with a broody synthesizer and then one element after the other comes in. By the end, you should be in the Zeal & Ardor world." Lead single "Run" is described as "non-stop aggressive" and features a music video described as "disturbing" set in a psychiatric hospital, Gagneux described the video stating "Garrick Lauterbach, who directed it and I share a fascination with deep dreams and AI. Being able to weave it into a narrative of mental diaspora was an incredible treat." "Death to the Holy" has elements of blues & a piano, features a "metalcore type breakdown" and "evil synthziers", with Gagneux describing it as "the most Zeal & Ardor song on the record."

"Emersion" features elements of post-rock and a contrasting "relax(ing) hip hop beat" alongside black metal. "Golden Liar" is described by Gagneux as "a slow burn. Rather than using harsh tones to convey heaviness, it uses lyrics and atmosphere to convey weight. It's both smoke and fire." The song's atmospheric elements were inspired by Ennio Morricone. A music video was released, directed by Max Carlo Kohal. "Erase" was created with the intention to "confuse you in the most pleasant way possible". The song features elements of progressive rock.

"Bow" features elements of soul music, Gagneux described it as "tak[ing] out established musical themes and plac[ing] them into a completely different background. It's an amalgam of things bestowing bad luck demanding you to join it." Inspired by industrial and electronic music, the track was written to be "awe-inspiring" and "grandiose". "Feed the Machine" was inspired by Ministry, and originally featured programmed drums that drummer Marco Von Allmen stated were too fast to be able to perform before they were slowed down. "I Caught You" has nu-metal influences, particularly Deftones. "Church Burns" features "the most potentially controversial lyrics of the album... in the most pop-adjacent song we have." Gagneux described the breakdown as inspired by ZZ Top.

"Götterdämmerung", named after a movement in a Richard Wagner opera, is sung mostly in German and described by Gagneux as "our most bare bones song yet. No gimmicks, no frills, no distractions, just rage." Further explaining, Gagneux stated "Wagner was heavily used by not-so-great people in the '30s and '40s in Germany. So I wanted to reappropriate and reclaim Wagner, even though he himself was a huge dick, too—but dude wrote brilliant music." "Hold Your Head Low" is an older song that had been played live dating back to 2017, with influences from Opeth. "J-M-B" features jazz chords put to metal, and stands for "Jazz Metal Blues". Closing track "A-H-I-L" is an atmospheric somber track, with Gagneux stating "it's like that hopeless, drab rainy day in Norway, like 'my father just got killed by a pack of wolves' kind of vibe. I just wanted to try and emulate that with synthesizers, as far removed from actual black metal as possible.

== Critical reception ==
Professional ratings
Review scores
Source	Rating
Distorted Sound	9/10
Heavy Mag	positive
Kerrang!	4/5 stars
The Line of Best Fit	7/10
Metal Hammer	4.5/5 stars
Metal Storm	7.8/10
Soundsphere	4/5 stars
Blabbermouth	8/10
Wall of Sound	7/10
ToiletOvHell	4.5/5 stars

The album received positive critical reviews. Kerrang! stated "Industrial rhythms, gently plucked guitars and synthy soundscapes may haunt these realms, but the blood and fire reverberating through history's dark corridors remains. Indeed, there are moments on this self-titled third album which find Zeal & Ardor at their heaviest-hitting yet, even as their musical singularity boasts definite crossover appeal." Writing for The Line of Best Fit, John Amen gave the album a 7/10 rating and concluded, "Zeal & Ardor continue to assert their versatility, though the expression of unadulterated rage – toward earthly life, perhaps toward existence itself – has become their primary mission. They've committed to a fertile template, even if it's a fairly well-trampled one."

=== Accolades ===
Publication	List	Rank
Metal Hammer	The Best Metal Albums of 2022 So Far	–

== Track listing ==
All tracks are written by Manuel Gagneux.

No.	Title	Length
1.	"Zeal & Ardor"	1:58
2.	"Run"	3:16
3.	"Death to the Holy"	3:07
4.	"Emersion"	3:34
5.	"Golden Liar"	3:43
6.	"Erase"	4:01
7.	"Bow"	2:13
8.	"Feed the Machine"	2:39
9.	"I Caught You"	4:07
10.	"Church Burns"	3:03
11.	"Götterdämmerung"	3:03
12.	"Hold Your Head Low"	4:43
13.	"J-M-B (Jazz, Metal, Blues)"	1:54
14.	"A-H-I-L (All Hope Is Lost)"	2:36
Total length:		43:57

== Personnel ==
Credits adapted from the album's liner notes.

Zeal & Ardor

- Manuel Gagneux – lead vocals, backing vocals, lead guitar, rhythm guitar, bass guitar, synthesizer, samples, programming, production, art design
- Marco Von Allmen – drums, photography
- Marc Obrist – recording production

Additional personnel

- Will Putney – mixing, mastering
- Noé Herrmann – art design
- Nico Charon – illustrations

== Charts ==
Chart performance for Zeal & Ardor
Chart (2022)	Peak position
Belgian Albums (Ultratop Wallonia)	171
German Albums (Offizielle Top 100)	27
Scottish Albums (OCC)	51
Swiss Albums (Schweizer Hitparade)	5
UK Independent Albums (OCC)	15
UK Rock & Metal Albums (OCC)	3
