= ArcTanGent Festival =

Annual British rock festival

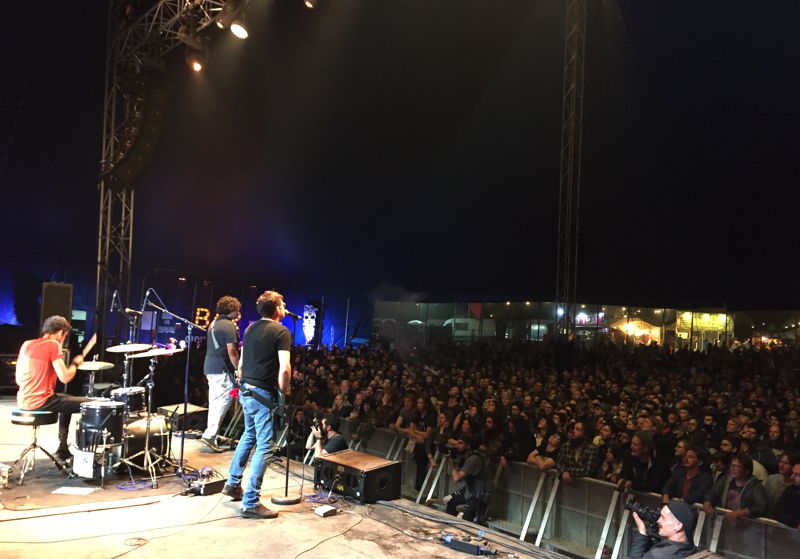
- Genre: Math rock; post rock; progressive metal; alternative rock; technical metal; experimental music
- Dates: August
- Locations: Compton Martin, near Bristol, Somerset, England (2013-2026). Moreton-in-Marsh, Gloucestershire, England (2027-)
- Years active: 2013–present
- Website: arctangent.co.uk

ArcTanGent Festival (also known as ATG) is a three-day British rock festival held annually since 2013. The festival specialises in experimental rock, metal, prog, math rock, post rock, post-metal, hardcore, and electronic music. It was hosted at Fernhill Farm near Bristol, Somerset until 2026, moving to Todenham Manor Farm in Gloucestershire for 2027 onwards. The festival is named after the Earthtone9 album arc'tan'gent (2000).

Previous performers include Primus, Chelsea Wolfe, Heilung, Mogwai, Meshuggah, Devin Townsend, Explosions in the Sky, Coheed & Cambria, Opeth, Glassjaw, Godspeed You! Black Emperor, Sleep Token, Polyphia, Converge, Karnivool, Animals As Leaders, Shellac, American Football, TesseracT, The Dillinger Escape Plan, Russian Circles, Wardruna, Electric Wizard, Carpenter Brut, Igorrr, Alcest, Cult of Luna, Battles, Public Service Broadcasting, Empire State Bastard, Deafheaven, And So I Watch You from Afar, 65daysofstatic and Fuck Buttons.

The festival features four stages, silent disco after the live performances have finished, a selection of bars and food vendors, and weekend camping and VIP options.

== 2013 ==
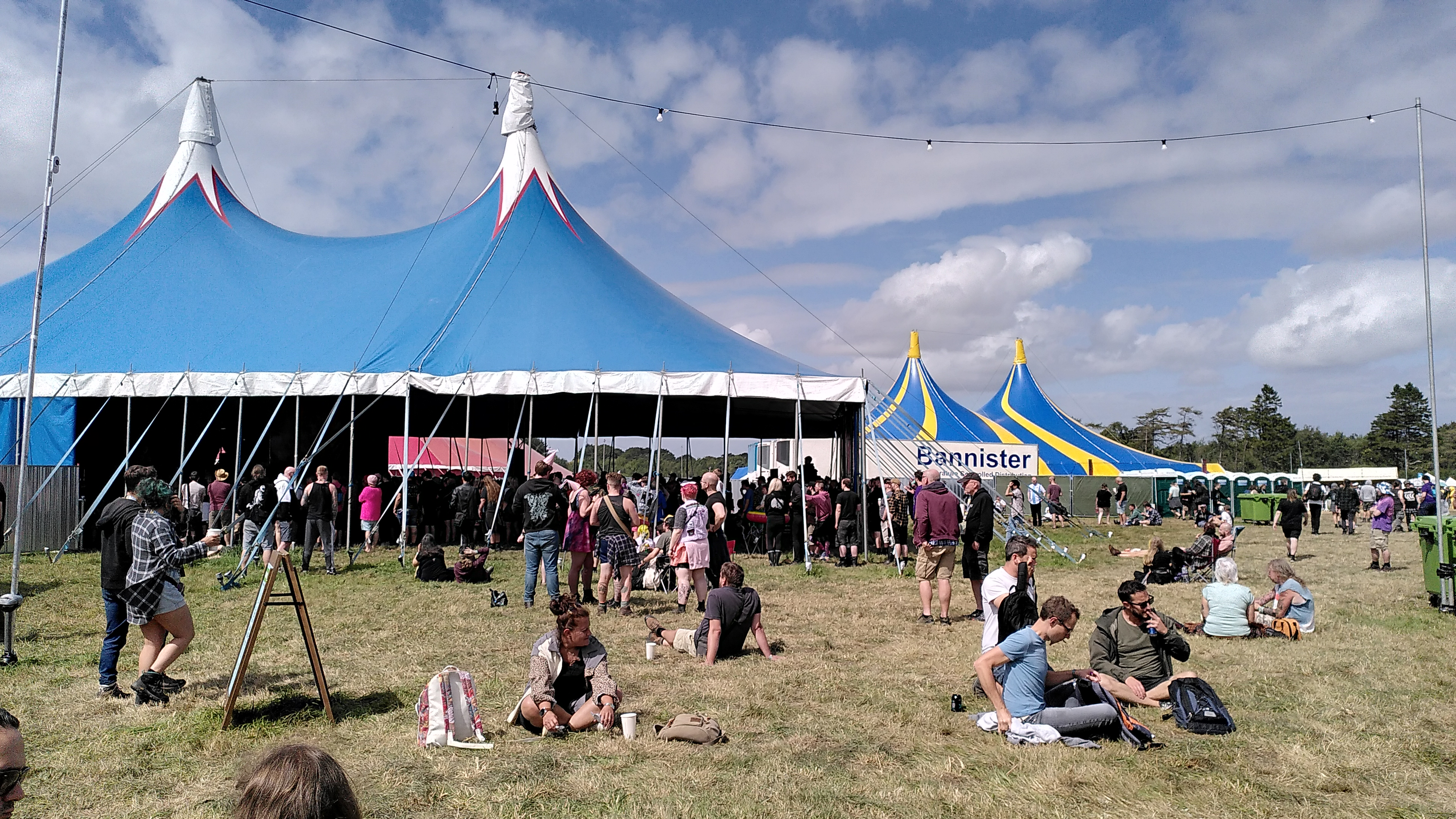
ArcTanGent 2022.

The 2013 edition of the festival was the first to be held. It has since returned annually, albeit now one week earlier each year.

The Yohkai stage was curated by Damnation Festival on the Friday.

Thursday 29 August
Yohkai

Maybeshewill
Amplifier
Talons
Pohl
Falling Stacks
Flights
Memory of Elephants

Friday 30 August
Arc	Yohkai	Bixler	PX3
65daysofstatic Future of the Left; Rolo Tomassi; Maybeshewill; Zun Zun Egui; Yndi Halda; Thought Forms; BLKSTRS; Baby Godzilla; The Naturals	Earthtone9; Dragged into Sunlight; Bossk; Devil Sold His Soul; Winterfylleth; Humanfly; Manatees; Astrohenge	Public Service Broadcasting; Brontide; That Fucking Tank; The Physics House Band; You Slut! Anthroprophh / Big Naturals; Spectres; Poly-Math	Damien Schneider; RiceBeats; Fairhorns; Charlie Barnes; Deej Dharwal; SJ Esau; Vostok; Joe Garcia

Saturday 31 August
Arc	Yohkai	Bixler	PX3
Fuck Buttons; And So I Watch You from Afar; Three Trapped Tigers; Islet; TTNG; Vessels; The Pirate Ship Quintet; Delta Sleep; Anta	Bo Ningen; Tall Ships; Johnny Foreigner; Among Brothers; The St Pierre Snake Invasion; Axes; Scarlet Racal & The Trainwreck	Turbowolf; Arcane Roots; Nordic Giants; Castrovalva; Fat Goth; Cleft; Hysterical Injury; Oliver Wilde	Non Classical DJs; Tom Beef (+The Mother Beef); Howard James Kenny; Giant Swan; The Dagger Brothers; Oxygen Thief; Theo

== 2014 ==
The PX3 stage was relocated from the campsite to the main arena for the 2014 edition and every year since.

Thursday 28 August
Yohkai

And So I Watch You from Afar
Three Trapped Tigers
TTNG
The Physics House Band
Baby Godzilla
Nordic Giants
The St Pierre Snake Invasion
Theo

Friday 29 August
Arc	Yohkai	Bixler	PX3
Russian Circles; This Will Destroy You; Crippled Black Phoenix; EF; Human Pyramids; Diagonal; Rumour Cubes; Monsters Build Mean Robots; Alpha Male Tea Party	Maybeshewill; Tera Melos; Enemies; Purson; Bats; Lost in the Riots; We Are Knuckle Dragger; Suffer Like G Did	Tellison; El Ten Eleven; 100 Onces; Memory of Elephants; Olympians; Big Joan; Flies Are Spies from Hell	Cleft; Charlie Barnes; Iran Iran; Sleep Beggar; Super Squarecloud; Howard James Kenny

Saturday 30 August
Arc	Yohkai	Bixler	PX3
Mono; God Is an Astronaut; Tall Ships; Jamie Lenman; Mutiny on the Bounty; Blueneck; Goonies Never Say Die; Luo; The Winchester Club	Lite; Year of No Light; Mylets; Fen; Hark; Alarmist; Charlie Barnes; Astrohenge	I Like Trains; Tangled Hair; Gunning for Tamar; AK/DK; Codes in the Clouds; No Spill Blood; Adding Machines; Samoans	Shiver; The Broken Oak Duet; Bear Makes Ninja; Karhide; Waking Aida; Wicket

== 2015 ==
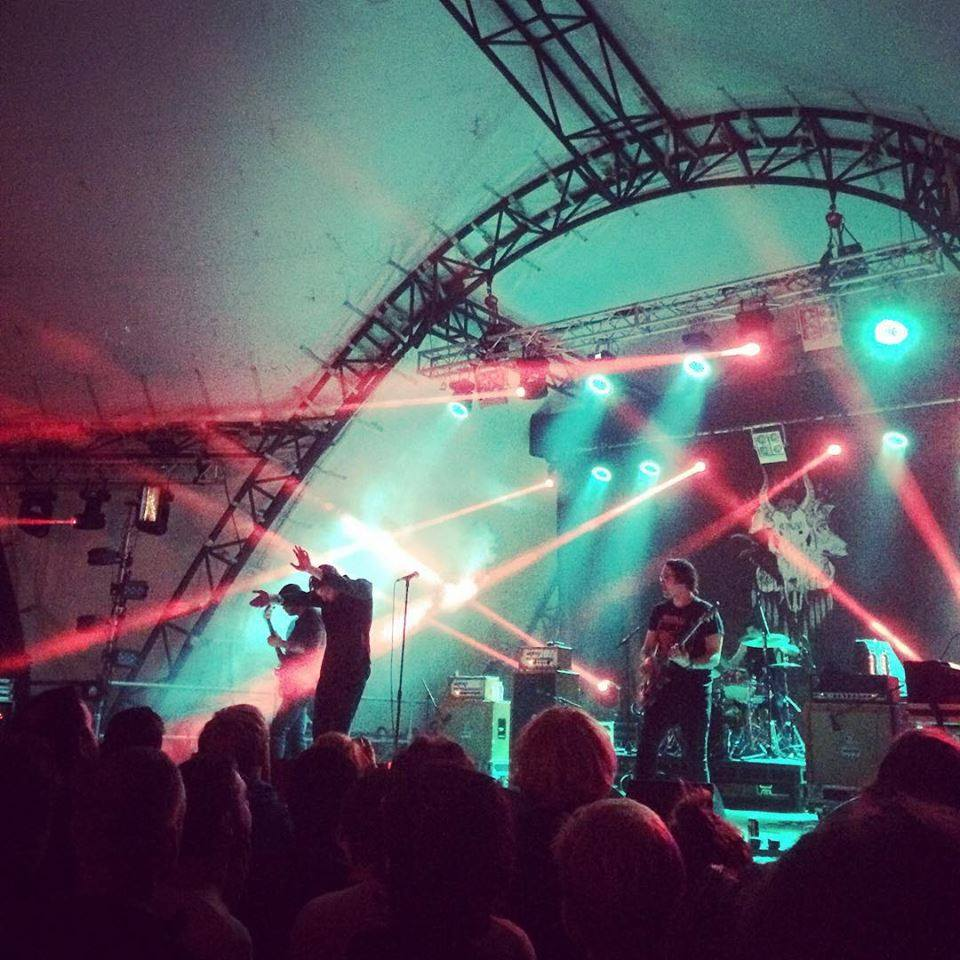
Deafheaven headlining the Arc stage in 2015

Where the 2013–14 editions were held on the last weekend in August, the 2015 edition moved a week earlier in August where it has remained since.

The 2015 edition was the first time the PX3 stage hosted performances on all three days of the festival, with the Thursday PX3 program curated by BBC Introducing. This edition of the festival also included a Sargent House takeover, with several of their artists performing including Deafheaven, Emma Ruth Rundle, Marriages, Helms Alee and Mylets.

Cult of Luna were originally scheduled to perform on the Arc stage before Deafheaven, however they instead headlined the Yohkai stage after flight delays.

Thursday 20 August
Yohkai

65daysofstatic
Lite
Mutiny on the Bounty
Mylets
AK/DK
Cleft
Alpha Male Tea Party

Friday 21 August
Arc	Yohkai	Bixler	PX3
The Dillinger Escape Plan; The Fall of Troy; Maybeshewill; Joan of Arc; That Fucking Tank; Body Hound; Trojan Horse; Tacoma Narrows Bridge Disaster	Vennart; Chon; Rolo Tomassi; Her Name Is Calla; 11Paranoias; The Fierce and the Dead; Quadrupede	Blanck Mass; Helms Alee; Delta Sleep; PSOTY; Valerian Swing; We Never Learned to Live; Cousin	Emma Ruth Rundle; Patchwork Natives; Sonance; Obe; Ohhms; Pocket Apocalypse; Downard; Juffage

Saturday 22 August
Arc	Yohkai	Bixler	PX3
Deafheaven; Deerhoof pg.lost Talons; Axes; Black Peaks; 100 Onces	Cult of Luna; Marriages; British Theatre; Young Legionnaire; Prosperina; Latitudes; USA Nails	Toundra; The Algorithm; Tangled Hair; Lone Wolf; Gum Takes Tooth; Flood of Red; Poly-Math	Vessels; Alright the Captain; Vasa; IEPI; Vodun; Crows an Wra; Lambhorn; Eschar; Steve Strong

== 2016 ==
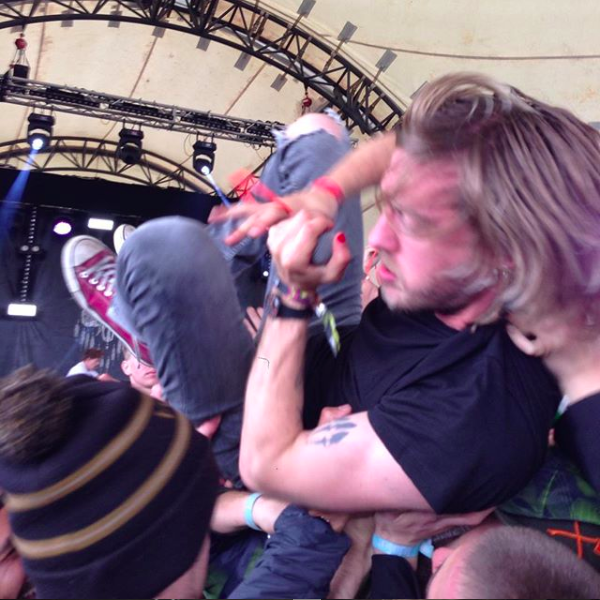
Pieter-Paul Devos of Raketkanon, performing at ArcTanGent 2016

The Bixler stage was relocated from the campsite to the main arena for the 2016 edition and every year since. All four stages are now situated in the main arena.

Cleft performed their final ever show at the 2016 edition of the festival. The set was recorded and the movie posthumously screened across seven UK shows in December 2018 as part of One More Tour: In Memory of Dan Wild-Beesley.

Thursday 18 August
Yohkai	PX3
Mono; Three Trapped Tigers; TTNG; Rolo Tomassi; Talons; Memory of Elephants; Body Hound	Axes; Quadrupede; Delta Sleep; Alarmist; Samoans; Poly-Math; Anta

Friday 19 August
Arc	Yohkai	Bixler	PX3
Godspeed You! Black Emperor toe La Dispute; Arcane Roots; MNHM; Vasudeva	Nordic Giants; Animals as Leaders; Agent Fresco; Knifeworld; Tiny Fingers; Intervals; Viva Belgrado	Monuments; Cleft; Heck; Gulfer; Fall of Messiah; The Brackish; Sleep Kit	Plini; Svalbard; Falls; A Werewolf! Floral; Eugene Quell; Adam Betts; Super Goliath

Saturday 20 August
Arc	Yohkai	Bixler	PX3
American Football; And So I Watch You from Afar; Caspian mewithoutYou; Errors; Raketkanon; Exassens; Lets Talk Daggers	Meet Me in St. Louis; Yndi Halda; Mutoid Man; Black Peaks; Totorro; Dialects; Envoys	Gallops; Enemies; ZEUS! Owen; Town Portal; VLMV; Bearded Youth Quest	Foes; Weddings; Landscapes; Cheap Jazz; Classically Handsome Brutes; Space Blood; Kusanagi; Chiyoda Ku; Skyhitch

== 2017 ==
Thursday 17 August
Yohkai	PX3
Russian Circles; Future of the Left; Tall Ships; Totorro; Gallops; Town Portal; Bearded Youth Quest	Nordic Giants; Heck; Vasudeva; USA Nails; Fall of Messiah; Chiyoda Ku; Waking Aida

Friday 18 August
Arc	Yohkai	Bixler	PX3
Converge; God Is an Astronaut; TTNG; Listener; Stearica; Alpha Male Tea Party; Hikes; Right Hand Left Hand	Leprous; The Number Twelve Looks Like You; Bossk; Thought Forms; Wot Gorilla? Hemelbestormer; You Break, You Buy; Gilmore Trail	Ho99o9; The Evil Usses; Hark; Ohhms; Living Body; ItoldyouIwouldeatyou; Madilan	worriedaboutsatan Vola; Frontierer; A-Tota-So; Nitkowski; Lice; Britney; Hoggs Bison

Saturday 19 August
Arc	Yohkai	Bixler	PX3
Explosions in the Sky; TesseracT; Boris sleepmakeswaves The Physics House Band; Spectres; Toska; HCBP	SikTh tricot Devil Sold His Soul; Lost in Kiev; Jardín de la Croix; Future Horizons; Boss Keloid	Jambinai; Defeater; Brutus; Gug; Pijn; He Was Eaten By Owls; Real Terms	The St Pierre Snake Invasion; Employed to Serve; Landscapes; Shitwife; Death Pedals; Halo Tora; Irk; Poisonous Birds

== 2018 ==
The 2018 event was the first year in which the Arc stage featured bands performing on all three days.

The Thursday Yohkai and PX3 lineups were curated in part by Big Scary Monsters vs Holy Roar respectively.

Gallops were the first band to play a live set as part of the silent disco, performing fully electric on the Thursday night.

Chiyoda Ku replaced Mugstar on the Yohkai stage. Jo Quail joined Takaakira 'Taka' Goto for the Behind The Shadow Drops performance.

The festival marked Giraffes? Giraffes! first ever performance outside of North America since their formation in 2001.

Thursday 16 August
Arc	Yohkai	PX3
And So I Watch You from Afar; Pianos Become the Teeth; Foxing; People Like Milk Products	La Dispute; Jamie Lenman; Rolo Tomassi; Delta Sleep; Ohhms; Alpha Male Tea Party; Boss Keloid	Tangled Hair; Bossk; Pijn & Conjurer; Svalbard; Gulfer; Body Hound; Cassels

Friday 17 August
Arc	Yohkai	Bixler	PX3
Glassjaw; Anathema; Pelican; Vennart; Talons; Poly-Math; Space Blood; Seven Colour Drive	Leprous; Zeal & Ardor; Tides from Nebula; Chiyoda Ku; Astralia; Orchards; Blanket	Tides of Man; Strobes; Halo Tora; Conjurer; Bearfoot Beware; God Mother; Modern Rituals	Behind the Shadow Drops; Blueneck; Black Futures; Jo Quail; Mr Marcaille; Wren; Codices; Natalie Evans

Saturday 18 August
Arc	Yohkai	Bixler	PX3
Shellac of North America; Alcest; Myrkur; Giraffes? Giraffes! Plini; Jean Jean; Hey Colossus; Trigger Thumb	Arcane Roots; Mouse on the Keys; Black Peaks; Telepathy; Bad Sign; La Jungle; Only Echoes Remain	Pigs Pigs Pigs Pigs Pigs Pigs Pigs; Part Chimp; Gug; Arcane Roots (Electronic); Vasquez; Ilenkus; Death and the Penguin	Scalping; Toska; The Guru Guru; Coldbones; Møl; VLMV; Sœur; The Big Massive Orchestra

== 2019 ==
On 6 September 2018 Meshuggah was announced as the first headliner.

The 2019 event featured an expanded site footprint and an additional campsite, albeit the layout remained largely unchanged. There was also the introduction of the Bar Stage, located in the centre of the site.

Friday night once again featured live sets as part of the silent disco, including The Algorithm and GosT. There were also silent disco sets from John Stanier and Effigy across the weekend.

The main stage was opened by The Beft; a Tribute to Dan Wild-Beesley of Cleft and featured guest musicians including Mike Vennart. Black Peaks set featured Jamie Lenman on vocals due to the absence of the band's singer Will Gardner. And So I Watch You From Afar performed their debut album in full for an unannounced special guest slot on the Arc stage.

Thursday 15 August
Arc	Yohkai	Bixler	PX3	Bar Room
Coheed & Cambria; Carpenter Brut; Zeal & Ardor; Nordic Giants; Bossk; The Beft	Daughters; Polyphia; Covet; Pigs Pigs Pigs Pigs Pigs Pigs Pigs; Cocaine Piss; Floral	AK/DK; Raketkanon; Møl; Bats; Mammoth Weed Wizard Bastard; Cultdreams	Memory of Elephants; Pijn; Lost in the Riots; Conjurer; Yvette Young; Ithaca; Big Lad	Sleep Beggar; Theo; Kuro; Pave; Haunt the Woods

Friday 16 August
Arc	Yohkai	Bixler	PX3	Bar Room
Battles; Russian Circles; 65daysofstatic The Ocean; Thank You Scientist; Standards; Good Game; A. A. Williams	TTNG; Black Peaks; Toska; The Algorithm; Puerto Austral; Slow Crush; We Never Learned To Live	Frontierer; Zu; Sleep Token; Birds In Row; All The Best Tapes; Dags! CLT DRP	Brutus; Colossal Squid; Palm Reader; Sithu Aye; Too Piste; Rad Pitt; Cattle; Hexcut	Steve Strong; Sœur; No Violet; Charlie Barnes; VLMV; Seven Colour Drive; Øgïvęš

Saturday 17 August
Arc	Yohkai	Bixler	PX3	Bar Room
Meshuggah; Cult of Luna; And So I Watch You From Afar; Three Trapped Tigers; The Physics House Band; Matt Calvert; The St Pierre Snake Invasion; DJ Perro	Caspian; Gnod; The Contortionist; Invalids; Curse These Metal Hands; Kaguu; Wild Cat Strike	Employed to Serve; Car Bomb; Elephant Gym; Azusa; Aiming For Enrike; Gender Roles; Øgïvęš Big Band	Doblecapa; Voronoi; Letters From The Colony; Puppy; LLNN; AMNT; Midas Fall; Sugar Horse	Kinlaw + Franco Franco a-tota-so Oxygen Thief; Howard James Kenny; Twin Siblings; Qarlaq; Torsten Jensen

== 2020–21 cancellations due to COVID-19 ==
On 5 May 2020, ArcTanGent was cancelled due to the COVID-19 pandemic. On 21 May 2021, ArcTanGent was cancelled again due to the COVID-19 pandemic, citing the lack of a government insurance scheme to cover COVID-19-related cancellations of music festivals (especially due to increasing spread of Lineage B.1.617 in the UK amid its lifting of restrictions).

== 2022 ==
ArcTanGent returned after two years of cancellations, with the festival taking place over 16–20 August 2022. The headliners were Cult of Luna, TesseracT and Opeth. The site had a new layout, with the Elephant in the Bar Room stage significantly larger than 2019, which hosted the Wednesday night line-up curated by Effigy, followed by a full line-up across all five stages across the weekend:

Wednesday 17 August
Elephant in the Bar Room

The St Pierre Snake Invasion
Sugar Horse
Memory of Elephants
Mother Vulture
Luo
Modern Rituals
Mutant Thoughts
Olanza
The Road
My Octopus Mind
Lightning Sharks

Thursday 18 August
Arc	Yohkai	Bixler	PX3	Elephant in the Bar Room
Cult of Luna; Amenra; Perturbator; Delta Sleep; A.A. Williams; DVNE; Pijn; Bonnacons of Doom	Maybeshewill; Alcest; Intronaut; Puppy; Blodet; Vasa; The Hyena Kill	Mclusky; Bossk; Imperial Triumphant; Ogives Big Band; Bicurious; Skin Failure; Fes	We Never Learned To Live; Boss Keloid; Outlander; Cryptic Shift; Peach; Bear; Graywave; Traps	Bolt Ruin; Natalie Evans; Lakes; Coldbones; Worriedaboutsatan; Skemer; Qariaq; Podcast: The Long Drive Home

Friday 19 August
Arc	Yohkai	Bixler	PX3	Elephant in the Bar Room
Tesseract; Mono; Caspian; Oranssi Pazuzu; Covet; Mol; Hippotraktor; Five the Heirophant	Zeal & Ardor; Jamie Lenman; Alpha Male Tea Party; Slow Crush; Astrosaur; Odradek; Heisa	Scalping; Rivers of Nihil; BRUIT ≤ God Alone; El Moono; Still; Ni Maitres	Palm Reader; Stake; Arabrot; Blanket; Tuskar; Binge; Rubbing; Last Hyena	Paranoid Void; Straight Girl; Zetra; Jakub Zytecki; Stosszahn; Let's Swim, Get Swimming; Pollyanna Holland-Wing; Podcast: ArtScare

Saturday 20 August
Arc	Yohkai	Bixler	PX3	Elephant in the Bar Room
Opeth; TWDY; The Armed; Devil Sold His Soul; Conjurer; Kokomo; Jo Quail; Seims	Leprous; Lightning Bolt; Emma Ruth Rundle; Frontierer; The Hirsch Effekt; Tots; Thumpermonkey	Godflesh; Pallbearer; Elephant Tree; Famyne; Sergeant Thunderhoof; Ithaca; Garganjua	Her Name Is Calla; Pupil Slicer; Wheel; Mass of the Fermenting Dregs; Castrovalva; My Own Private Alaska; Heriot; Respire; Dead Bird	Miet; Beige Palace; Axiom; Catbamboo; Wavey; Vogons; Stanlaey; Podcast: The Riot Act

== 2023 ==
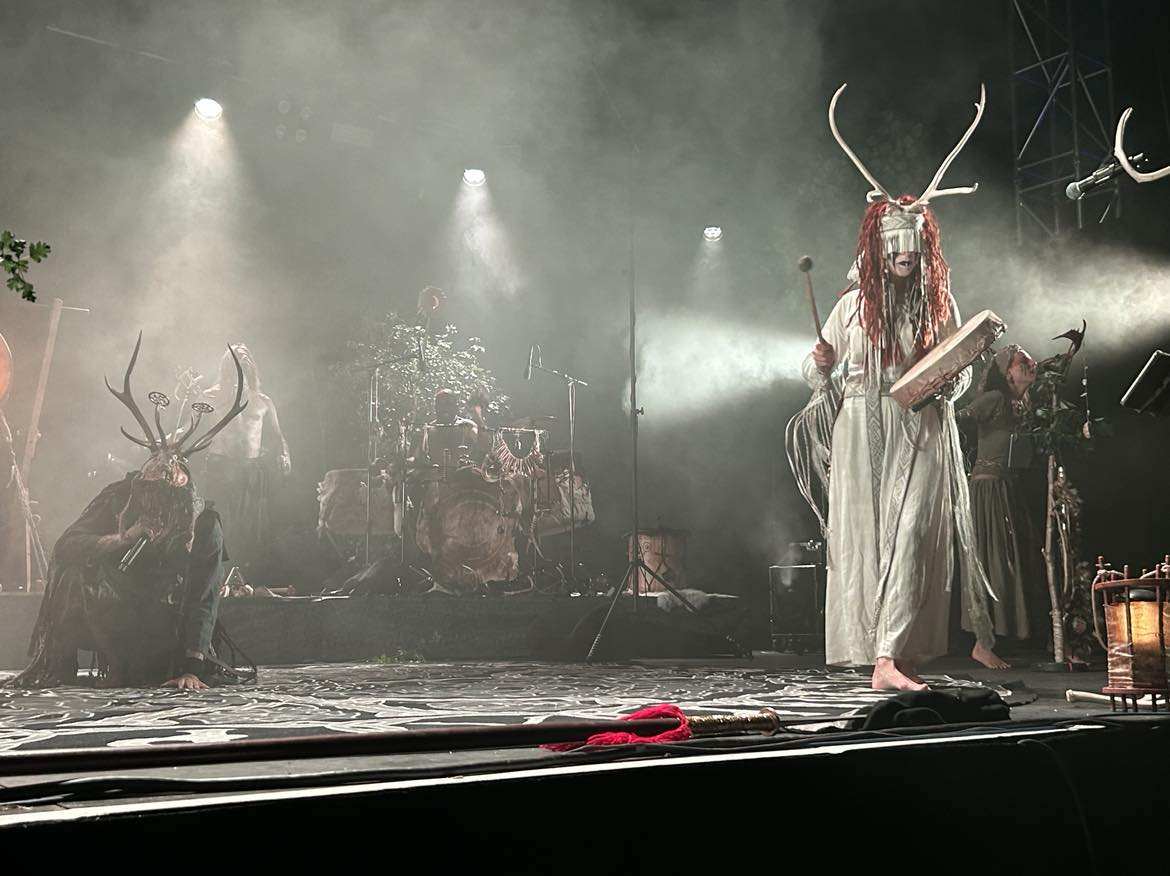
Heilung headlining ArcTanGent 2023

ArcTanGent 2023 was headlined by Converge, Heilung and Devin Townsend, and took place on 16–19 August 2023. Deafheaven's set was playing their 2013 album Sunbather in full. The Ocean also performed a surprise Silent Disco set. The full line-up was:

Wednesday 16 August
Bixler

Straight Girl
Scalping
Conjurer
DVNE
Pupil Slicer
Hippotraktor
Skin Failure
Bicurious
Five the Heirophant
Ogives Big Band

Thursday 17 August
Main	Yohkai	Bixler	PX3	Elephant
Converge; Russian Circles; Empire State Bastard; Cave In; Wiegedood; Chinese Football; Mountain Caller; Barrens	Pigs Pigs Pigs Pigs Pigs Pigs Pigs; Brutus; Chat Pile; Svalbard; Butch Kassidy; Pothamus; Chalk Hands	Yourcodenameis:milo; Elder; The Guru Guru; Hypno5e; Wallowing; Burial Clouds; Din of Celestial Birds	Sugar Horse; ~~I Built the Sky~~; Other Half; Birds in Row; Hammok; False Hope for the Savage; Attan; Mt. Yonder; Grief Ritual	Ramkot a-tota-so Parachute for Gordo; Poisonous Birds; Mission Creep; Los Sara Fontan; Apidae; Podcast: 101 Part Time Jobs Podcast: Hell Bent for Metal

Friday 18 August
Main	Yohkai	Bixler	PX3	Elephant
Heilung; Swans; And So I Watch You From Afar; Jaga Jazzist; Holy Fawn; Caligula's Horse; Curse These Metal Hands; Wess Meets West	SikTh; The Ocean; Liturgy; The St Pierre Snake Invasion '68; Joliette; Witch Sorrow	Enslaved; Bell Witch; Petbrick; Ashenspire blanket Spurv; Haast	LLNN; Death Goals; Helpless; Spook the Horses; Dawn Ray'd; Mother Vulture; Norman Westberg; Silverburn; Hidden Mothers	CLT DRP; HAAL; Project Mishram; Pruillip; Host Body; Lys Morke; Lack the Low; Podcast: 3 is the Magic Number; Podcast: Fecking Bahamas

Saturday 19 August
Main	Yohkai	Bixler	PX3	Elephant
Devin Townsend; Igorrr; Deafheaven; Rolo Tomassi; Vola; GGGOLDDD; Psychonaut; The Most	Haken; The Fall of Troy; The World Is a Beautiful Place & I Am No Longer Afraid to Die; Standards; La Bestia de Gevaudan; Briqueville; A Burial at Sea	Loathe; Health; The Callous Daoboys; Domkraft; Grub Nap; Bones of Minerva; Copse	Ohhms; Abraham (band)|Abraham; Aiming for Enrike; The K. Cobra the Impaler; Bear (band)|Bear; Land Wars; Naut	Tokky Horror; ~~Every Hell~~; Playgrounded; Fakeyourdeath; Thought Forms; Cultdreams; Lawi Anywar; Podcast: Damnation Vs. Podcast: Mark and Me

== 2024 ==
On 6 November 2023, ArcTanGent announced the first wave of bands for the 2024 festival, their 10th birthday bash. The festival took place 14–17 August 2024, featuring a final farewell show from Three Trapped Tigers and a Wednesday headlining set voted for by fans from And So I Watch You From Afar. On 16 November ATG announced Meshuggah as the Friday night headliner, alongside Animals as Leaders. On 25 January ATG announced "pretty much ALL the bands for ATG #10", adding another 50+ bands to the lineup including the Thursday headliner Explosions in the Sky and Saturday's headliner Mogwai. On 27 February the organisers announced the final 23 bands for this year's lineup.

On 19 April the festival released the stage times and clashfinder for this year's lineup. Clown Core was originally scheduled to play on the Thursday but had to drop out due to health issues, and were replaced with Spiritualized.

Wednesday 14 August
Yokhai

And So I Watch You From Afar
Bossk
LLNN
Curse These Metal Hands
Psychonaut
Cobra the Impaler
Din of Celestial Birds
Hidden Mothers
Host Body

Thursday 15 August
Main	Yokhai	Bixler	PX3	Elephant
Explosions in the Sky; Spiritualized; Baroness; Julie Christmas; Bo Ningen; Healthyliving; AVKRVST itoldyouiwouldeatyou	Amenra; Red Fang; Conan; Wyatt E. Earthside; Underdark; Pleiades	Textures; Kalandra; Cats and Cats and Cats; URNE; The Sad Season unpeople Kulk	John Cxnnor; Author & Punisher; Kaonashi; Squid Pisser; Filth Is Eternal; Hundred Year Old Man; Oddism; Seneca	Tokky Horror; Nailbreaker; Skemer; Doodsekader; Sun Spot; Gloom Index; A-Sun Amissa

Friday 16 August
Main	Yokhai	Bixler	PX3	Elephant
Meshuggah; Animals as Leaders; Ihsahn; Three Trapped Tigers; Year of No Light; The Omnific; Zetra i Häxa	Plini; Delta Sleep; Night Verses; Outrun The Sunlight; Shy, Low; BLACK$HAPE; Asymetric Universe	Show Me the Body; Sigh; Orchards; Maruja; Iress; The Sun's Journey Through The Night; Modern Technology	Komfortrasuchen; Blood Command; Frail Body; Glassing; Every Hell; Fange; Bipolar Architecture; HAAL	Teeth of the Sea; Yard; Madmess; Benefits; Yomi Ship; Sans Froid; CAHILL//COSTELLO

Saturday 17 August
Main	Yokhai	Bixler	PX3	Elephant
Mogwai; Electric Wizard; And So I Watch You From Afar; SCALER; Bossk; Hexvessel; BRIQUEVILLE; Anta	Caspian; Brontide; Imperial Triumphant; Silver Moth; VOWER; Sunnata; FORT	Slift earthtone9 The Psychotic Monks; KEN Mode; WuW; Haus Horo; Codex Serafini	MSPAINT; Gallops; Sâver; Nadir; Ànteros; Love Sex Machine; Cassus; Torpor	COLOSSAL SQUID; Thot; Iskandr; PEACH; Thank; Quade; Maebe

== 2025 ==
The 2025 festival was headlined by Godspeed You! Black Emperor, Karnivool, TesseracT and Wardruna. The Wednesday lineup was expanded from previous years with bands playing across two stages, with Wardruna headlining on the main stage, while the festival's fifth stage Elephant was nixed this year. Ithaca played their final ever show at ArcTanGent, while Maybeshewill and Rolo Tomassi's sets both celebrated their 20th anniversary as bands. Both Between the Buried and Me and We Lost the Sea played two sets on separate days, one playing an album in full (Colors and Departure Songs, respectively) and one of other material. Anciients were originally announced for the festival but later dropped out, replaced by Dimscûa.

Wednesday 13 August
Main	Yokhai	PX3
Wardruna	Slift; Kalandra; Year of No Light; Healthyliving; Hundred Year Old Man; Sans Froid	Teeth of the Sea; Colossal Squid; Underdark; God Alone; Thank

Thursday 14 August
Main	Yokhai	Bixler	PX3
Godspeed You! Black Emperor; Leprous; Melvins; The Fall of Troy (playing Doppelgänger in full); We Lost the Sea; REZN; Drongo; Lost in Kiev	Arab Strap; Kylesa; Pelican; Lowen; Pothamus; Ni; The Sad Season; YARD ‡	Sungazer; Tangled Hair vianova snooze Horrendous; Maud the Moth; The Grey	Battlesnake; Tayne street grease Meryl Streek; The Gorge; As Living Arrows; Lemondaze; Codespeaker

Friday 15 August
Main	Yokhai	Bixler	PX3
Karnivool; Mew; Green Lung envy Emma Ruth Rundle; Car Bomb; Ithaca; Overhead, The Albatross	Maybeshewill; Between the Buried and Me (playing Colors in full); Future of the Left; Alpha Male Tea Party; Dimscûa; Giant Walker; YOSHIZAWA; Nordic Giants ‡ Walpurgis ‡	Frontierer; We Lost the Sea (playing Departure Songs in full) delving Coilguns; Heave Blood & Die; Papangu; Mt. Onsra	Gost; VOWER meth. Sure; EYES palmeras negras Hexcut; Chalk Hands

Saturday 16 August
Main	Yokhai	Bixler	PX3
TesseracT; Clown Core; Rolo Tomassi; Between the Buried and Me; Sleepytime Gorilla Museum; The Callous Daoboys; A Swarm of the Sun; Sugar Horse	God Is An Astronaut; Adebisi Shank; Unprocessed; DVNE; Bipolar Architechture; Lo! Love Rarely; John Cxnnor ‡	Mclusky; Ahab; Inter Arma; OMO; Royal Sorrow; Sometime in February; Wren	Vessels; Kayo Dot; Vincent Vocoder Voice; Waldo's Gift; Boneflower; Burner; Swamp Coffin; Indifferent Engine; 2 Promoters, 1 Pod

‡ live silent disco set

== 2026 ==
The 2026 festival took place from 19 to 22 August 2026 at Fernhill Farm in Somerset. It was the final edition to be held at Fernhill Farm before the festival's planned move to Todenham Manor Farm in Gloucestershire in 2027. The headliners were announced on 26 November 2025: Primus, Chelsea Wolfe, and Cult of Luna & Julie Christmas performing Mariner in full for its 10th anniversary. The Wednesday lineup again features bands who played the 2025 edition of the festival, with SikTh headlining. On 29 January the festival announced another 46 bands for the lineup. On 26 February the final 16 bands were announced, including Cardiacs playing the main stage on the Wednesday, the first ever UK show for The Tony Danza Tapdance Extravaganza, and a reunion performance from Youthmovies.

Múr, SOM, HUGGING, and NYOS were all originally announced for the lineup, later replaced by Lili Refrain, KULK, Din of Celestial Birds and Reclus.É respectively.

On 1 July the organisers announced that 2026 would be the final year at Fernhill Farm, later announcing the new site of Todenham Manor Farm, near Moreton-in-Marsh, Gloucestershire for the 2027 festival onwards.

Wednesday 19 August
Yokhai	PX3
SikTh; Cardiacs; Svalbard; Lost in Kyiv; Overhead, The Albatross; Chalk Hands; Swamp Coffin; God Alone ‡	Alpha Male Tea Party; Papangu; Dimscûa; Sans Froid; Giant Walker; The Grey

Thursday 20 August
Main	Yokhai	Bixler	PX3
Chelsea Wolfe; Igorrr; Alcest; Nordic Giants; Psychonaut; OTAY:ONII; Iskandr; IAN	Maruja; The Tony Danza Tapdance Extravaganza; Agent Fresco; Ronker; Zeta; KLÄMP; L.O.E. Bruise Blood ‡	MØL; Scorpion Milk; Michael Cera Palin; Benthos; Pil & Bue; HAAL; Terminals	Zu; Shearling; XO Armor; FLOATING; Bucket; Matador; Witchsorrow; Sleemo

Friday 21 August
Main	Yokhai	Bixler	PX3
Primus; Perturbator; Arcane Roots; Mass of the Fermenting Dregs; Conjurer; Zatokrev moksha The Sad Season	Napalm Death; Nothing; Heck; The Intersphere; ZAHN; Ringlets; Señor Pink; Amplifier ‡	BRUIT ≤ Youthmovies; KULK; Barrens; You Win Again Gravity; No Violet; Wildernesses	Scaler; Witch Fever; Lili Refrain; Believe in Nothing; Night Swimming; Civil Service; Blessings; WORN OUT

Saturday 22 August
Main	Yokhai	Bixler	PX3
Cult of Luna & Julie Christmas (playing Mariner in full); Eivør; Chat Pile; Oathbreaker; Jo Quail & the Crossbones Ensemble; Gösta Berlings Saga; Kathryn Joseph; Sara Zozaya	High on Fire; TTNG; Jamie Lenman itoldyouiwouldeatyou Din of Celestial Birds; Reclus.É; PREYRS; 2 Promoters, 1 Pod; Battlesnake ‡	A.A. Williams; Humanfly; Darkher; SKLOSS lowheaven Tanzana; Erotic Secrets of Pompeii	MASTER BOOT RECORD; Pupil Slicer; Town Portal; Hang Linton; Leeched; Forlorn; Meatdripper; Pleb

‡ live silent disco set

== 2027 ==
The 2027 festival is due to take place on 18–21 August 2027 at its new home of Todenham Manor Farm in Moreton-in-Marsh, Gloucestershire, UK. The festival organisers announced the first 43 bands on the lineup on 30 September 2026, including two of the headliners: Blood Incantation and Neurosis. Blood Incantation's set will include their album Absolute Elsewhere in full, while The Ocean and If These Trees Could Talk's sets were both confirmed as 2027 UK exclusive performances. The Wildhearts will play a special prog set, and Employed to Serve will play a 10th anniversary set of their album The Warmth of a Dying Sun.

On 4 November a further 19 bands were announced for the 2027 lineup, including Wednesday co-headliners Russian Circles and Brutus. Future of the Left will play a 20th anniversary set of their debut album Curses. Messa, who were included in the first announcement, were confirmed to no longer be playing.

Wednesday 18 August
Stage TBA

Russian Circles
Brutus
MØL
Conjurer
Zatokrev
WORN OUT
Ronker
IAN
Psychonaut
Din of Celestial Birds
L.O.E.

Thursday 19 August
Main	Stage TBA
Blood Incantation	The Ocean; Lowen; If These Trees Could Talk; Employed to Serve; Earthside; Smote; Million Moons; Thank; Urzah; Remote Viewing; Hippotraktor hubris. Kong

Friday 20 August
Stage TBA

Slift
Sadness
Múr
SubRosa
Future of the Left
Catholics
Machukha
Other Half
cowboyy
Concrete Ships
Details
Mountainscape
Speedial
a-tota-so
Cold Night for Alligators
Death Goals & Tunic

Saturday 21 August
Main	Stage TBA
Neurosis	Elder; The Wildhearts; Holy Fawn; Crown Lands; Faetooth; Crash of Rhinos; Long Distance Runner; Sans Froid; Victor Villarreal; A Forest of Stars; Drearleader; Every Hell; Pancho; TRAVO; Earth Moves; Ihlo; Lancing Hand paper hats Bloed

== Awards ==
During 2013–2014, the festival was shortlisted for several awards including, Best New Festival, Best Grassroots Festival and Best Small Festival at the UK Festival Awards as well as Best Independent Music Festival at the AIM Awards.

In 2013, the festival won the award for Best Toilets at the UK Festival Awards. In 2016, the festival was shortlisted for Best Headline Performance of the Year for American Football and Line Up of the Year at the UK Festival Awards. In 2018, the festival won the award for Best Small Festival at the UK Festival Awards.

== Annual warm-up ==
The festival has hosted an official annual warm-up party each year in Bristol, England in collaboration with promoters Effigy, ForFans ofBands and ArtScare. The event takes place in May each year and has featured mainstays and favourites of the festival including Gallops, The Physics House Band, Cleft, Talons, Toska, Alpha Male Tea Party, Memory of Elephants, Chiyoda Ku, Sœur and Jo Quail
