= List of blackgaze artists =

This list should only include notable bands with existing Wikipedia articles. Do not add bands if they do not have a Wikipedia entry.

For the main article, please see Blackgaze.

- Alcest
- Amesoeurs
- Asunojokei
- Bosse-de-Nage
- Deafheaven
- Fen
- Heretoir
- Infant Island
- Holy Fawn
- Lantlôs
- Møl
- Myrkur
- Seaweed Mustache
- Sylvaine
- Oathbreaker
- Vaura
- White Ward
- Suldusk
- Sadness
