= El Moono =

British rock band

- Origin: Brighton, England
- Genres: Rock; Heavy Metal; Post-hardcore; Alternative rock; Progressive rock; Experimental rock; alternative metal
- Years active: 2016-present
- Label: Lockjaw Records
- Members: Zac Jackson; Jamie Haas; Harry Logan; Chris Cartwright
- Website: elmoono.com

El Moono is an English rock/metal band formed in 2016 in Brighton, England. The group was founded by guitarist/vocalist Zac Jackson, guitarist Jamie Haas & bassist Harry Logan while they were studying at university. Drummer Chris Cartwright joined in 2019, completing the band's lineup.

The band combine alt-metal and post-hardcore influences, utilising unusual time signatures, guitar riffs and heavy screaming melodies in their music, along with shoegaze and post-rock inspired textures, within song structures reminiscent progressive rock. The band are outspoken in their support of mental health awareness and LGBTQ rights. Frontperson Zac Jackson said: "I wear a dress onstage. It’s ridiculous that so many people have an opinion on it and want to comment on someone else’s appearance."

In 2022, El Moono released mini-album Temple Corrupted, which was followed by their official full-length debut album The Waking Sun on 10th May 2024.

== History ==
=== Early years and Tides (2016–2020) ===
Zac Jackson and Jamie Haas met at BIMM University, Brighton in 2015, and the pair began to write music together. Zac’s friend from his hometown of St Albans, Hertfordshire, Harry Logan moved to the city in 2016 and joined the pair, writing their early singles with drummer Alfie Webber, a friend of Haas’ from their hometown of Alton, Hampshire.

The band's first EP, Tides, was released in 2018, alongside touring around the UK, radio play by Alex Baker at Kerrang! Radio, and a feature in Kerrang! magazine.

Chris Cartwright joined the band in 2019 as their drummer.

El Moono were included on independent label Small Pond’s Emerging project, including their new track "Thanks for Nothing", their first written with Cartwright. The song marks the first time the band worked with longtime producer Sam Coveney.

=== Temple Corrupted (2021–2022) ===
During the 2020 COVID-19 lockdown, the band started to demo new songs from home, sending files back and forth to each other. They entered The Old Chapel Studio in October 2020 with producer Sam Coveney, tracking over the course of 5 days.

The record attracted the attention of independent label Lockjaw Records, and the band signed to the label in early 2021

The first single from Temple Corrupted, "Forced to Smile", was released in July 2021, followed by "White Gold" (written about the George Floyd murder and the 2020 Black Lives Matter movement) and "Final Execution". The full seven-track album was released in February 2022 to critical acclaim.

While marketed as a concept EP, Temple Corrupted explores themes of human self-destruction, depression, and how the global political landscape of the early 2020s affects the mental health of the individual.

The band embarked on an extensive tour of the UK, including slots at RADAR festival, Arctangent Festival, and Burn it Down Festival.

=== The Waking Sun (2023–present) ===
Writing for The Waking Sun began in 2022, after renewed confidence following the bands appearance at Arctangent festival. The band spent the autumn demoing extensively, concentrating more on melody and more conventional song structures, while retaining their already developed heavy sound with use of odd time signatures.

El Moono reconvened with producer Sam Coveney in January 2023 at Middle Farm Studios.

The band took a break from the studio to hit the road with The St Pierre Snake Invasion on their Galore tour, and played shows with fellow Brightoners Intechnicolour and Black Peaks offshoot band Skin Failure, before heading back into the studio in their hometown of Brighton to record overdubs for the album, including a feature with Congratulations' Leah Stanhope.

The first single from The Waking Sun was titled "Chains", a track the band had been playing live since 2018. It was released in October 2023 alongside a music video directed by Kieran Gallop.

The album was officially announced alongside second single "The First Man on Mars" in January 2024 and saw extensive radio play on Kerrang! Radio, and was also featured on the Kerrang! website.

The next single, "The Charm", saw the band embrace a more traditional song structure and melodies.

"Haunting" was released in March 2024 with pre-orders for the album on vinyl and CD, alongside the announcement of an 11-date headline tour in support of the album in May/June 2024. The band had further support from Metal Hammer magazine, citing "Haunting" as their top single of that week.

El Moono also shared news that The Waking Sun would be released in Dolby Atmos spacial 360 audio, mixed by Sam Coveney, and launched at a special listening event at Dolby HQ in London on 8 May 2024. The album was released to critical acclaim on 10 May, alongside a stripped-down acoustic performance at Banquet Records on the day of release.

The band toured the album around the UK from June 2024, including sold out headline shows in Brighton on 31st May and London on 1st June, and an appearance at Arctangent Festival for the festival's 10th anniversary. The band opened for Author and Punisher on their UK tour, and appeared at various smaller festivals in the UK. On Halloween, the band performed a surprise tribute gig to Deftones to a sold-out hometown audience.

The 2024 Waking Sun tour concluded with two shows performing The Waking Sun in full on 13 and 14 December in the band's hometown of Brighton and Kingston upon Thames. The band were named in Metal Hammer's hottest new metal bands of 2024.

== Members ==
- Zac Jackson - Lead vocals, guitar (2016-present)
- Jamie Haas - Guitars, backing vocals (2016-present)
- Harry Logan - Bass guitar (2016-present)
- Chris Cartwright - Drums (2019-present)

== Discography ==
- Temple Corrupted (2022)
- The Waking Sun (2024)
