= We Lost the Sea =

Australian post-rock band

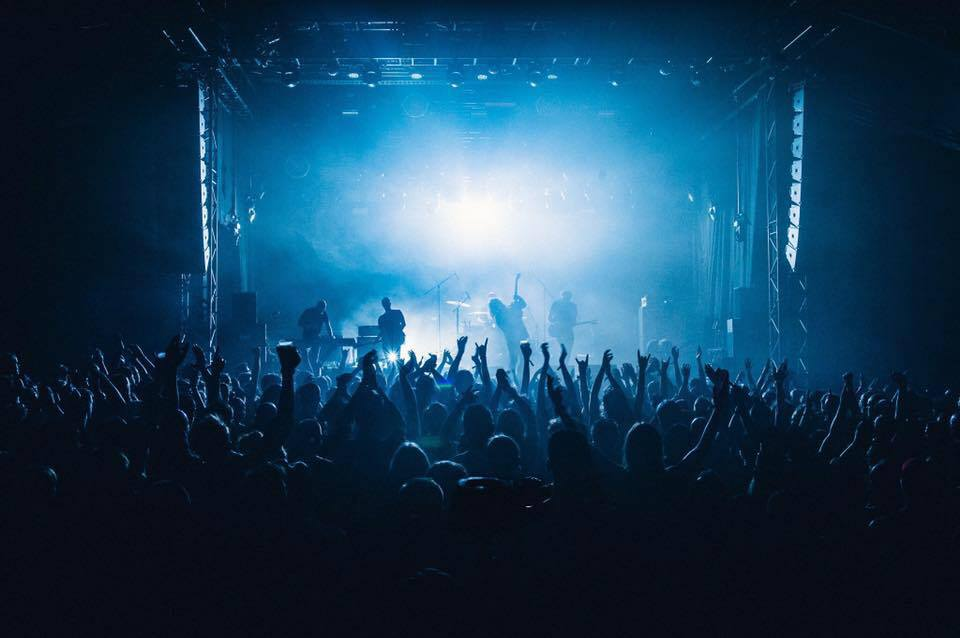
- We Lost the Sea playing Dunk! Festival 2017

Background information
- Origin: Sydney, New South Wales, Australia
- Genres: Post-rock; post-metal
- Years active: 2007–present
- Labels: Bird's Robe (AUS); Dunk! (BEL); Translation Loss (USA)
- Members: Mark Owen; Matt Harvey; Kieran Elliott; Mathew Kelly; Carl Whitbread; Alasdair Belling
- Past members: Chris Torpy; Nathaniel D'Ugo; Brendon Warner; Grant Warner; Bradley Garnam; Jared Ryan
- Website: welostthesea.com

We Lost the Sea are an instrumental post-rock band from Sydney, Australia, formed by friends from multiple bands that had dissolved in 2007 from the outer west Sydney suburb of Campbelltown. The current lineup consists of Mark Owen, Matt Harvey, Mathew Kelly, Kieran Elliott, Alasdair Belling, and Carl Whitbread.

The band's third studio album, Departure Songs, gained them widespread acclaim within the post-rock and metal scenes around the world. They have reached notable success internationally for their live performances. The band is currently signed to the Australian independent label Bird's Robe Records, which is distributed through MGM in Australia and independently worldwide.

== History ==
=== Early years, Crimea ===
The band was formed when Mark Owen approached Nathaniel D'Ugo to start a band with him after Nathaniel's former band Omeratá had broken up. From here they called upon friends Chris Torpy on vocals and the twin brothers Grant and Brendon Warner on guitar from another local band Sound The Mute to join. The idea was to create a huge and heavy sounding project that would act like a collaborative of musicians. The band's member line up has changed many times, at one point consisting of nine members. The band's name doesn't have a specific meaning. The early members wanted a name that creates an enigmatic feeling, evokes emotion and leaves interpretation up to the listener. The group often incorporates themes into their albums such as loss, grief and hope, space exploration, war and stories from history.

They released their first record, entitled Crimea, engineered and mixed by Magnus Lindberg of Cult of Luna in February 2009 at Sing Sing studios in Melbourne, Australia. This was released only on CD and independently by the band the following year. This record was inspired by poems written about the Crimean War and famous heroic figures such as Florence Nightingale.

=== The Quietest Place on Earth ===
In 2010 the band went into the studio to record their second album The Quietest Place on Earth. Complications and member changes delayed the release of this record until 2012 when Grant Warner and Brad Garnam left the band and Matt Harvey (former member of Omeratá) joined on guitars after receiving a last minute call from vocalist Chris Torpy, who asked him to come to a rehearsal. A short time after the band joined with Bird's Robe Records.

The record was received well and was followed up with a handful of highly successful local shows including their sold out album launch and supporting American post-metal band Rosetta where the band debuted the new line up and songs. Lochlan Watt from Triple J and Dave Drayton from FBi Radio both mentioned the band in the best of 2012 in Drum Media's writers poll.

On 2 March 2013, vocalist Chris Torpy died by suicide, after which the band took a short break. Their first show without Chris took place on 21 March 2013 at the Annandale Hotel, opening for This Will Destroy You.

On 26 April 2014, We Lost the Sea held a tribute and benefit show to raise awareness and money for suicide prevention and education surrounding depression and anxiety in association with Beyondblue Australia.

=== Departure Songs ===
In 2015, the band recorded and released their third LP Departure Songs initially through Bird's Robe Records and Art As Catharsis Records in Australia. It was later released in Europe through Dunk!Records and in North America through Translation Loss Records. This record is their first all-instrumental album and was a slight shift away from their old dynamic. Heavily affected by the loss of Chris, Departure Songs is a concept album inspired by failed, yet epic and honourable individual journeys or events throughout history where people have done extraordinary things for the greater good of those around them, and the progress of the human race itself. Each song has its own story and is a soundtrack to that story with its own piece of art to illustrate the journeys within the songs.

The artwork, made by guitarist Matt Harvey, helped wrap the theme of this record together with the music and found acclaim on its own merit with an article in Digital Arts Magazine (UK) and reaching over 42,000 views on Behance.

Departure Songs was received and reached critical acclaim all over the world in the regarded post-rock scene and even breaking out of the boundaries to reach different audiences everywhere.

Their song "A Gallant Gentleman", the main single from the album, featuring a Sydney girls school choir, has been featured on video projects, student films, and promotion for media brands and football clubs. It featured on the soundtrack for Ricky Gervais' show After Life released on Netflix in 2019. It also was featured on the soundtrack for Museum of Innocence, a Turkish drama series released on Netflix in 2026, based on the book with the same name written by Orhan Pamuk.

The penultimate track on the album, "Challenger – Part 1: Flight" has been used for interpretive dance routines and over documentaries. One album stream on YouTube had more than 4.6 million views in June 2020.

In 2023, writer Andrew McMillen of The Australian included the album in a list of albums that he considers "flawless" from recent decades. He wrote:

After losing its singer to suicide, this Sydney band opted to press on, and struck gold with a set of wordless songs – alternately delicate and crushingly heavy, showcasing light and shade – that was inspired by stories of lives lived and lost for the betterment of the human race.

=== Triumph and Disaster ===
In October 2019, the band released their fourth studio album, Triumph and Disaster.

=== A Single Flower ===
On 4 July 2025, the band released their fifth studio album, A Single Flower.

== Tours ==
The album Departure Songs generated enough buzz for the band to pursue extensive national tours of Australia. They were also invited to support post-rock and post-metal bands Baroness, Maybeshewill, This Will Destroy You, Caspian, Pelican, Earth, Jakob (NZ) and Japan's Mono and Boris on their Australian visits. Even being offered the support for Finnish cello-metal band Apocalyptica on their Australian tour.

=== First Australian headline tour ===
The band embarked on a nine date tour of Australia over the course of June and July 2016. The tour finished at a sold-out show at the Oxford Art Factory in Sydney where they played with the VOX youth choir from Sydney Philharmonia Choir.

=== Last Dive Tour ===
In January 2017, the band did a three-date east coast headline run to celebrate the end of the Departure Songs album cycle in Australia before heading to Europe. It also signified the last shows guitarist Brendon Warner would play with the band after deciding to leave to focus on studies. The Sydney Morning Herald listed the Sydney show at the Newtown Social Club as top 5 gig of the week next to artists like Nick Cave, PJ Harvey and Refused. Both the Sydney and Melbourne shows sold out.

=== 2017 European Tour ===
In May 2017, the band embarked on their first ever overseas tour to Europe with their debut show at the Belgian post-rock festival Dunk! This was followed by 16 shows around the continent playing some shows to sold-out crowds such as A38 in Budapest and WERK-2 in Leipzig and ending with a huge sold-out show in Paris. Carl Whitbread (Lo!, Omeratá) came on board as their touring guitarist for this tour. The tour also included Sydney post-rock/prog bands Meniscus and Dumbsaint.

=== TQPOE five-year anniversary tour ===
In December 2017 the group decided to tour in celebration of their second album The Quietest Place on Earth's fifth anniversary. They felt that it was underrepresented when it was released and Chris had died so soon after its official release that there was only a handful of shows played during that time. Joining them to fill in on vocals for this tour was Jarrod Krafczyk (The Amenta, Omeratá) and former guitarist Brendon Warner filled in on third guitar. This tour also included a last minute support addition from Rosetta who were in Australia touring with sleepmakeswaves at the time.

This tour is also when the band started working with Australian music booking agents Select Touring.

=== 2018 China tour ===
On 22 March 2018 the band embarked on a 10 show tour of China managed by the touring company New Noise. This was their first tour to Asia and they played in front of their biggest headline crowd to date at Shenzhen B10 Live, concluding with a show at This Town Needs (formerly Hidden Agenda) in Hong Kong. One of the first shows after it re-opened after UK band This Town Needs Guns had issues with immigration the previous year.

=== 2019 Australia & China tours ===
Following the release of their fourth album, the band conducted headline tours of Australia and China once again.

=== 2022-2023 UK/EU tour ===
After two years of cancellations due to the pandemic, the band returned to the UK and Europe in late 2022 and mid-2023, performing at a series of festivals including Damnation Festival, Gloomaar Festival, Dunk Festival and headlining shows across the UK, Belgium, Germany, Spain, France, Romania & Poland. This tour marked the last live performances featuring Nathaniel D'Ugo as drummer.

=== 2025 USA, UK, China, Australian tour ===
In support of 'A Single Flower' the band embarked on their first headlining USA tour, including Post Festival, Audiotree Live and with support duties from Swiss band hubris. They also performed at ArcTanGent Festival, CAN Festival & headlined their biggest ever hometown show at Sydney's Manning Bar in November.

=== 2026 USA, UK/EU tour ===
The band toured extensively through the UK in 2026, with the UK shows promoted by '2 Promoters 1 Pod' and featuring 800+ attending their headline show at London's Electric Ballroom, 1200+ at Dunk Festival Belgium and 500+ at Prospect Building in Bristol. Support acts were Overhead, The Albatross (UK/EU) and Dimscûa (UK only).

== Band members ==
=== Current ===
- Mark Owen – guitar (2007–present)
- Kieran Elliott – bass (2009–present)
- Mathew Kelly – piano, keyboards (2009–present)
- Matt Harvey – guitar (2012–present)
- Carl Whitbread – guitar (2017–present)
- Alasdair Belling – drums (2023–present)

=== Past ===
- Nathaniel D'Ugo – drums (2007–2023)
- Jared Ryan – bass (2007–2009)
- Bradley Garnam – guitar (2007–2012)
- Chris Torpy – vocals, samples (2007–2013; died 2013)
- Grant Warner – guitar (2008–2012)
- Brendon Warner – guitar (2008–2016)

== Discography ==
=== Albums ===
List of albums, with selected chart positions
Title	Album details	Peak chart positions
Title	Album details	AUS
Crimea	Released: July 2010; Label: We Lost the Sea; Format: CD, digital, LP (2014)	—
The Quietest Place on Earth	Released: December 2012; Label: We Lost the Sea; Format: CD, digital, 2×LP	—
Departure Songs	Released: September 2015; Label: Bird's Robe Records / Art As Catharsis Records; Format: CD, digital, 2×LP	—
Live at Dunk!Fest 2017	Released: March 2019; Label: Dunk!Records / Bird's Robe Records; Format: CD, digital, 2×LP; note: Live album	—
Triumph & Disaster	Released: October 2019; Label: Bird's Robe Records; Format: CD, 2×LP	41
A Single Flower	Released: July 2025; Label: Bird's Robe Records; Format: CD, 2×LP	83
