= Conjurer (band) =

British metal band

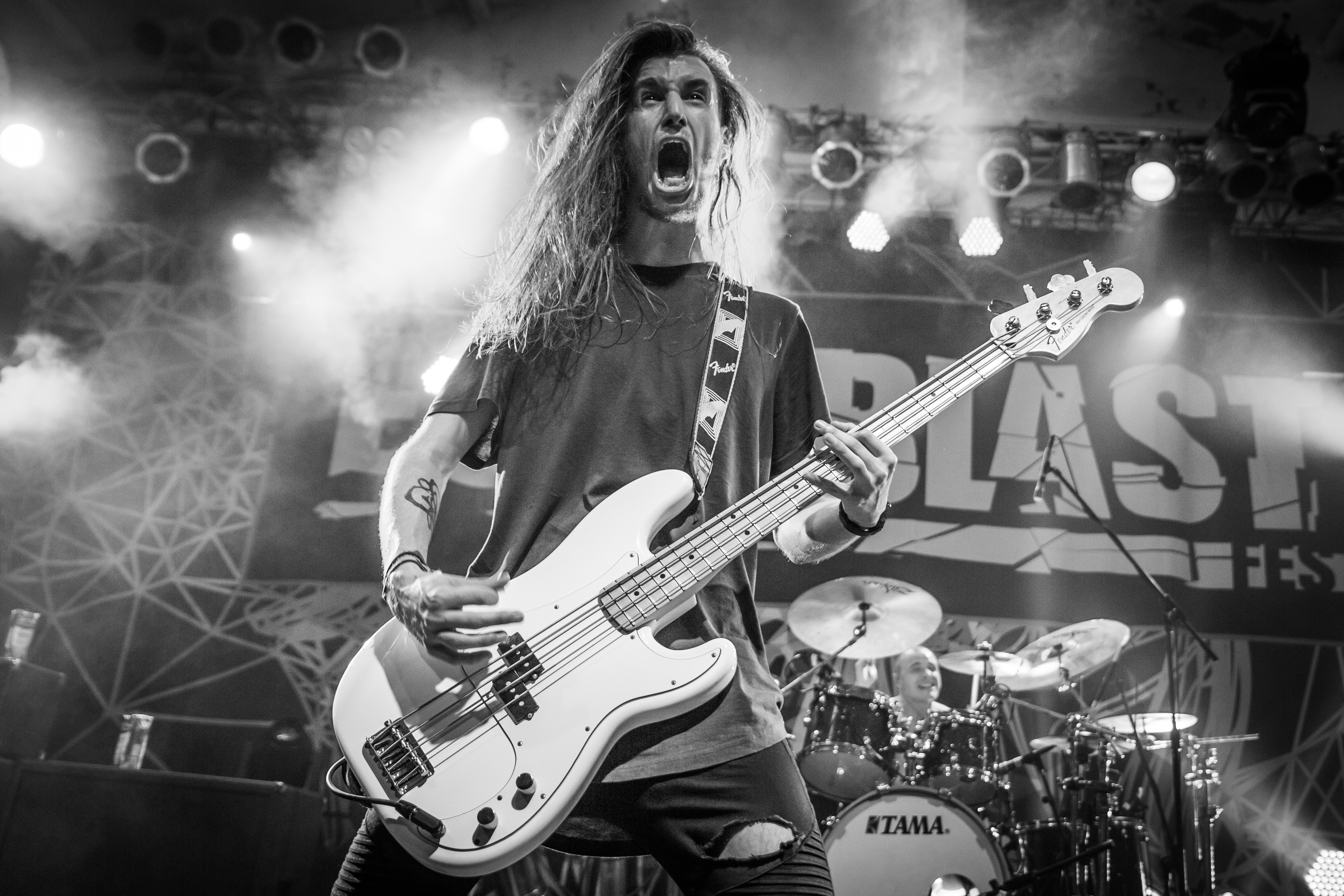
- Conjurer performing at Euroblast Festival, 2018

Background information
- Origin: Rugby, Warwickshire, England
- Genres: Sludge metal; post-metal; doom metal
- Years active: 2014–present
- Label: Nuclear Blast
- Members: Brady Deeprose; Conor Marshall; Dani Nightingale; Noah See
- Website: www.conjureruk.com

Conjurer are an English sludge metal/post-metal band from Rugby, Warwickshire. They are currently signed to Nuclear Blast Records.

== History ==
Conjurer were formed in 2014 by Brady Deeprose and Dani Nightingale, with Andy Price and Jan Krause completing the lineup; with the latter previously playing keyboards for British death-doom band Esoteric. The group built their following though frequent live performances. Deeprose cited Rugby's central location within the UK as helping the band reach a variety of venues.

In 2016, Conjurer released their first EP, "I" via Holy Roar Records. Around this time, they also performed at both Bloodstock and Damnation heavy metal festivals. The band released their first full-length album, Mire, in 2018, stating influences such as Gojira and The Black Dahlia Murder. Bassist Andy Price left the band just after Mire was recorded, to be replaced by Conor Marshall.

2018 also saw festival performances at ArcTanGent and 2000Trees, and a tour supporting fellow British Doom Metal band Conan.

In 2019 the band signed with Nuclear Blast. Conjurer released three new pieces of material in 2019; namely:

1. "Conjurer on Audiotree Live", a live recording of the band playing 5 of their previously released songs in one of Audiotree's well-known live recording sessions;
2. "Curse These Metal Hands", a collaborative effort with British post-rock band Pijn;
3. "Conjurer x Palm Reader", a split with fellow British band Palm Reader, consisting of each band covering two songs from other well-known metal and rock bands. Conjurer provide the A-side of the record, covering "Vermillion" by Slipknot, as well as "Blood and Thunder" by Mastodon.

2019 also saw the band's appearance at Download Festival, along with their first ever tour of the United States supporting Rivers of Nihil, and a further North American tour supporting Voivod.; as well as returning spots at both ArcTanGent and 2000trees music festivals.

In 2021, Conjurer played at the Download Pilot, a 2-day, 10,000-person capacity event which acted as part of the second phase of the British government's event research programme during the COVID-19 pandemic.

Conjurer also played Bloodstock Open Air and Damnation Festival in 2021. Drummer Jan Krause left the band following performing at these festivals for reasons of mental health, though would still feature on 2022's "Páthos", having performed drums, keys, and samples. Jan was replaced on drums by Noah See.

Conjurer released their second full-length album, "Páthos", in 2022. Paul Travers of Kerrang! declared Conjurer to be "one of the finest metal bands out there right now" based on this album. They performed at Hellfest, Radar Festival and once again ArcTanGent in summer 2022, supporting End on a European tour. Shortly thereafter, Conjurer also supported Carcass on their 2023 "Bloody Blighty" UK tour along with Unto Others. The band are currently set to play a 6-date tour of small music venues with British Alternative rock group Unpeople. The "United by Music" tour is one of many by the same name organised by the Music Venue Trust and funded by the UK National Lottery. The band were put forward for this tour by Kerrang! magazine, whose awards event is a charity partner of the Music Venue Trust.

== Curse These Metal Hands ==
"Curse These Metal Hands" is a collaborative project featuring members of Conjurer and Pijn. Originally formed for a one-off performance at ArcTanGent Festival in 2018, the project released their titular, four-track EP in 2019. The project has since performed at ArcTanGent in 2019 and 2023. "Curse These Metal Hands" is named after a quote from the British sitcom Peep Show, namely one of Jeremy Usbourne and Super Hans's musical projects.

== Musical style ==
Conjurer's music has been described as "non-specific" in terms of subgenre, with sludge metal, doom metal and post-metal elements frequently noted.

== Members ==
Current members

- Brady Deeprose – guitars, vocals (2014–present)
- Dani Nightingale – guitars, vocals (2014–present)
- Conor Marshall – bass (2017–present)
- Noah See – drums (2022–present)

Former members

- Andy Price – bass (2014–2017)
- Jan Krause – drums (2014–2021)

Timeline

== Discography ==
=== Studio albums ===
- Mire (2018)
- Pathos (2022)
- Unself (2025)

=== Live album ===
- Conjurer on Audiotree Live (2019) (digital release only)

EP

- I (2016)

Collaborations

- Curse These Metal Hands (2019) (with Pijn)
- Conjurer x Palm Reader (2019)

=== Singles ===
- "It Dwells" (2022)
- "Rot" (2022)
- "Cracks in the Pyre" (2022)
- "Hang Them In Your Head" (2025)
- "Let Us Live" (2025)
- "All Apart" (2025)
