= Alpha Male Tea Party =

British math rock band

- Origin: Liverpool, England
- Genres: Math rock; ambient; instrumental rock; experimental rock; progressive rock
- Years active: 2009–present
- Labels: Big Scary Monsters; Superstar Destroyer; Shipshaped Recordings
- Members: Tom Peters; Ben Griffiths; Greg Chapman
- Past members: Daniel Leadbetter; Pedro Ribeiro
- Website: alphamaleteaparty.co.uk

Alpha Male Tea Party are a British math rock band from Liverpool, England, formed in September 2009. The band currently consists of Tom Peters (vocals, guitar), Ben Griffiths (bass, vocals), and Greg Chapman (drums).

== History ==
Alpha Male Tea Party began as an "escape from the drudgery of full time employment" for Tom Peters, who began putting together demos for math rock songs on the music program Logic and advertised for band members on Gumtree. The earliest incarnation of the band was called Safe In A Shell. Many singers were auditioned, but none were deemed a fit for the band.

Debut album 'AMTP' and early shows featured Peters along with bassist Daniel Leadbetter and drummer Pedro Ribeiro. Greg Chapman was recruited to play drums in January 2012, the day after his last project had disintegrated. From the recording of second album 'Droids' onwards, the lineup consisted of Peters, Chapman, and bassist Ben Griffiths, whom Peters had never seen play bass but was recruited on the basis of being "a funny man".

Their third full-length album Health was released in June 2017 through Big Scary Monsters, and was produced by Tom Peters and Dan Wild-Beesley of the former Manchester band Cleft, a close friend of the band. Wild-Beesley worked through a period of ill health while producing the record, which influenced its "darker" sound.

Infinity Stare was recorded during the COVID-19 lockdown of May-June 2020 at Trapdoor Studios, a recording facility in Liverpool owned by Tom Peters. Released via Big Scary Monsters one day after its announcement in December 2020, after the death of Wild-Beesley. The grief of his passing strongly influenced the album, and led to a creative block for the band until the COVID-19 pandemic allowed them to focus more strongly on their work.

Fifth album Reptilian Brain was released through Big Scary Monsters in October 2025 after a break from touring and performing after the previous album. Recorded at Middle Farm Studios and Trapdoor Studios, it marked a significant change from previous work in that vocals were used throughout.

Alpha Male Tea Party played at ArcTanGent Festival in Bristol in 2014, 2015, 2017, 2018, 2025, and 2026. In 2019, the band played a set as 'The Beft - A Tribute to Dan Wild-Beesley´ featuring Mike Vennart formerly of Oceansize and John Simm, former drummer of Cleft. The set consisted of a 15 minute Cleft medley and an original piece written for the occasion featuring a guitar orchestra consisting of 20 guitarists. They were scheduled to play at the 2020 festival before it was cancelled, and were on the line up for 2021, which was rolled over into the 2022 edition after it was cancelled.

== Discography ==
Studio albums

- AMTP (2012)
- Droids (2014)
- Health (2017)
- Infinity Stare (2020)
- Reptilian Brain (2025)

EPs

- Real Ale and Model Rail: The Lonely Man's Guide To Not Committing Suicide (2013)
