= Lowen (band) =

English heavy metal band from London

- Origin: London, England
- Genres: Progressive metal; doom metal; oriental metal
- Years active: 2017–present
- Label: Church Road Records
- Members: Nina Saeidi; Shem Lucas; Cal Constantine

Lowen are an English heavy metal band formed in 2017 by Nina Saeidi and Shem Lucas. The daughter of refugees of the Iranian Revolution in England, Saeidi wished to start an act that would allow her to perform metal with Middle Eastern elements.

The duo was formed after meeting at an Akercocke show and they have released one EP and two albums, the latest being Do Not Go to War With the Demons of Mazandaran (2024).

== History ==
The band was formed in 2017 by Nina Saeidi (lead vocals, folk instruments, lyrics; born to parents who fled the Iranian Revolution) and Shem Lucas (guitars, bass) after they met at an Akercocke show. The name Lowen is partially inspired by the Lion Hunt of Ashurbanipal and constitutes "a bastardisation of the Germanic word for lion", according to Saeidi. The name also symbolizes a balance between the East and the West, with the lion symbolizing chaos and power to the former, and pride to the latter.

With drummer Louis Suckling, they debuted in July 2018 as a trio with the album A Crypt in the Stars, which was recorded in just 12 hours, except for some overdubs added later, and released independently with Saeidi handling most of the non-musical work, as well. It was almost entirely written over the course of 9 months of jam sessions, drawing inspiration from Mesopotamia and the Ziggurat of Ur.

In 2021, they released the EP Unceasing Lamentations, consisting of acoustic folk improvisations. It was originally performed for a live stream in Brighton and then sent to Magnus Lindberg of Cult of Luna for mastering.

Their second album, Do Not Go to War With the Demons of Mazandaran, was released on 4 October 2024 via Church Road Records featuring Cal Constantine on drums. It is inspired by Div-e Sepid of the Shahnameh, its title taken from one of the poem's chapters, while also alluding to contemporary matters such as the Woman, Life, Freedom movement. Among its tracks, there is "Corruption on Earth", which is named after the legal term used by the Iranian government against political prisoners sentenced to death. The album was promoted by the singles "Najang Bah Divhayeh Mazandaran" (the native equivalent to the album title), released on 3 May 2024; and "The Seed That Dreamed of Its Own Creation", released on 5 July, coinciding with the album announcement.

In March 2025, they were announced as a supporting act for Zakk Wylde's Zakk Sabbath's European tour. They also performed at Download Festival and ArcTanGent Festival.

In August 2025, Saeidi said the band were writing their third album, which would include samples of Israel bombs dropped in Iran in June 2025.

== Musical style ==
Lowen perform a blend of progressive, doom, death and stoner metal with Middle Eastern music. The duo consulted musicologists to discuss their approach, including Richard Dumbrill, who warned them that playing microtonal music on Western instruments "couldn't be done"; after studying folk music from Egypt, Turkey and Iran, Shem Lucas managed to recreate microtones using quarter-tone bends, pre-bends and slurred phrasing, seeing a connection between the rhythmic nature of Middle Eastern folk music and how guitars are sometimes used for percussion in brutal death metal. Sammy Urwin and Justine Jones of Employed to Serve (owners of Lowen's label Church Road Records) defined them as "world prog".

Nina Saeidi sings in English, Persian, Akkadian and Sumerian and is influenced by traditional and contemporary Iranian music, employing the Tahrir technique. Lowen's lyrics draw inspiration from ancient mythology, science fiction and fantasy. Saeidi discovered heavy metal as a teenager and was influenced by Akercocke and System of a Down, whose incorporation of music from their native Armenia inspired her to follow a similar path. She was initially the band's bassist and didn't even consider singing, but Shem Lucas encouraged her to do it after listening to her guide vocals.

Lucas is influenced by Mike Scheidt of YOB and Tom G Warrior of Celtic Frost, citing the latter's Monotheist as a particular favorite. He says Lowen's sound incorporates maqam, Iranian folk music and North African music and frequently explores time signatures other than 4/4.

== Discography ==
=== Studio albums ===
- A Crypt in the Stars (2018)
- Do Not Go to War With the Demons of Mazandaran (2024)

=== EPs ===
- Unceasing Lamentations (2021)

=== Singles ===
- "Najang Bah Divhayeh Mazandaran" (2024)
- "The Seed That Dreamed of Its Own Creation" (2024)

== Members ==
=== Current members ===
- Nina Saeidi – lead vocals, folk instruments (including: santur, daf, shruti box) (2017–present)
- Shem Lucas — guitars, bass (2017–present)
- Cal Constantine – drums (2022–present)

=== Session members ===
- Louis Suckling – drums 2018
