= Her Name Is Calla =

English post-rock band

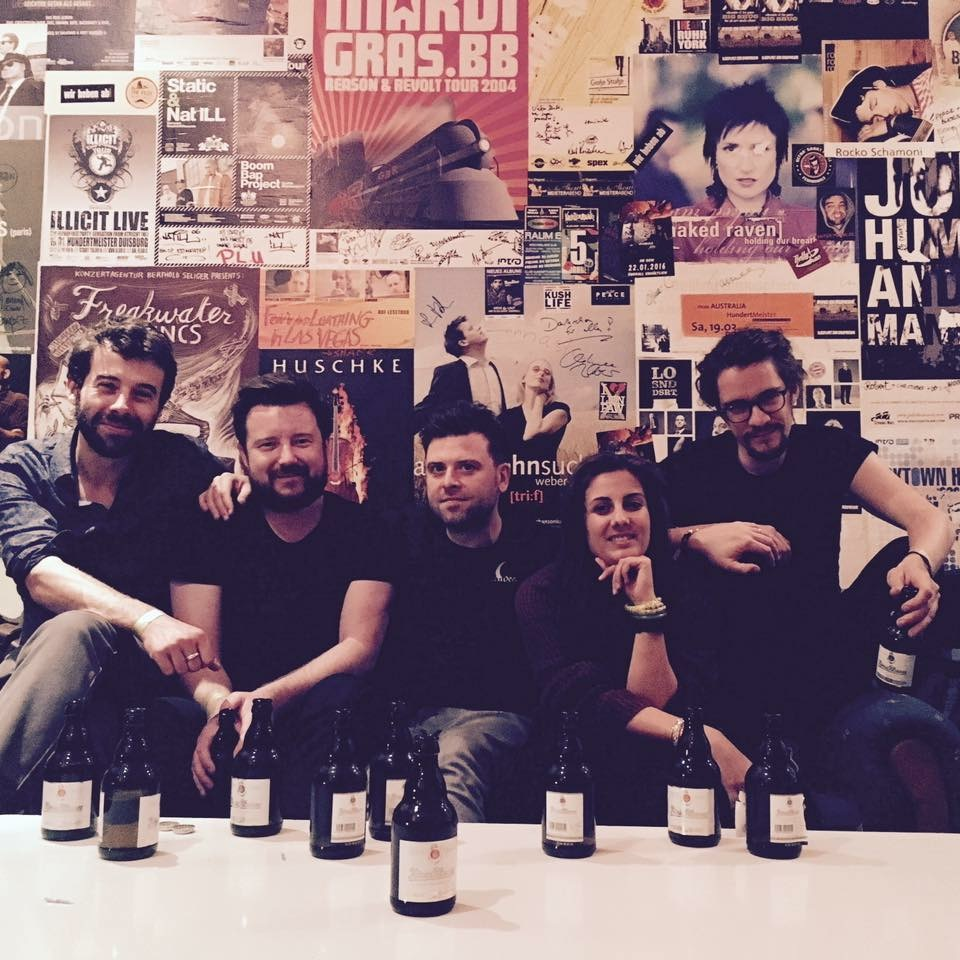
- At Platzhirsch, Germany, 2017

Background information
- Origin: Leicester/Leeds, England, United Kingdom
- Genres: Post-rock
- Years active: 2004–2019, 2022
- Label: Function
- Past members: Thom Corah; Anja Madhvani; Tom Morris; Adam Weikert; Tiernan Welch; Andrew Coles; Sophie Barnes; Scott Everett; Michael Love; John Helps; Sophie Green

Her Name Is Calla were an English post-rock band based in the English cities of Leicester and Leeds, England.

== History ==
After playing live throughout the United Kingdom to much critical acclaim, touring with iLiKETRAiNS and The Twilight Sad, Cult of Luna, Maybeshewill and Sólstafir, they released their debut album, The Heritage, in 2008, which was also positively acclaimed, and was followed by a well-received headlining tour. The album lasts over 50 minutes, despite only containing six tracks.

In February 2009, they announced their arrival on the German label, Denovali Records. Denovali re-released The Heritage on vinyl in late 2009.

The band released The Quiet Lamb, containing 12 tracks and lasting over 75 minutes, on 8 November 2010. NME gave it a score of 8/10, describing it as "massive, pastorally apocalyptic music". The Quiet Lamb is ranked the 12th best Post-rock album of all time in a poll of fans and reviewers with a critic's score of 83.

In 2014 after a turbulent hiatus, the band returned with their reflective third studio album, Navigator, which was supported by two UK tours and two European tours and single Ragman Roll. While the response to the Navigator was viewed positively by critics, it lacked the wider appeal witnessed with its predecessor.

In 2015, celebrating a decade of the playing together, the band released a short documentary entitled A Wave of Endorphins; a title inspired by the popular track "Pour More Oil" which appeared on The Quiet Lamb.

Lead vocalist Tom Morris has released music as a solo artist under the name T E Morris, as does multi-instrumentalist Adam Weikert as 'Weikie'.

In January 2019, the band announced break up and the final show took place on 4 May in London. Their final album, Animal Choir was released the same day to critical acclaim.

During ArcTanGent Festival 2022 near Bristol, the band played a one off reunion show on Saturday, 20 August.

== Discography ==
=== Studio albums ===
- The Heritage (2008)
- The Quiet Lamb (2010)
- Navigator (2014)
- A Wave Of Endorphins OST (2015)
- Animal Choir (2019)

=== EPs ===
- Long Grass (2010)
- Live at Denovali Swingfest 2010 (2010)
- Maw (2011)
- The Dead Rift (2018)

=== Singles ===
- "Swan" (2018)
- "Kaleidoscoping" 7" split with Deadwall (500 copies) Come play with me (2016)
- "Ragman roll" (2012)
- "A Moment of Clarity" (2007)
- "Condor and River" (2007)
- "Hideous Box" (2006)
- "The White and the Skin" (2005)

=== Demos ===
- Blueprints: Augustus, Will You Build Again? (2004)
- The Cracked Wooden Hands of the Master Craftsman (2004)
- Paraplegia (2004)

=== Splits ===
- Maybeshewill / Her Name is Calla (2008)

=== Other ===
- A Blood Promise DVD/CD (300 copies) Gizeh Records (2009)

== Band members ==
- Thom Corah - Synthesizer, Keyboards, Trombone
- Anja Madhvani - Violin, Vocals, Keyboards
- Tom Morris - Vocals, Guitar, Keyboards, Banjo
- Adam Weikert - Drums, Banjo, Keyboards, Mandolin, Double Bass, Theremin, Vocals
- Tiernan Welch - Bass, Vocals

== See also ==
- List of post-rock bands
