= Overhead, The Albatross =

Irish post-rock band

- Origin: Dublin
- Genres: Post-rock
- Years active: 2009–present
- Labels: Nice Weather For Airstrikes
- Members: Vinny Casey; Stevie Darragh; Luke Daly; David Prendergast
- Past members: Joe Panama * Ben Garrett
- Website: overheadthealbatross.bandcamp.com

Overhead, The Albatross is an Irish post-rock band from Dublin.

== Career ==
Overhead, The Albatross was founded in 2009; their name derives from a line in Pink Floyd's song "Echoes": "Overhead the albatross / Hangs motionless upon the air / And deep beneath the rolling waves / In labyrinths of coral caves / An echo of a distant time / Comes willowing across the sand / And everything is green and submarine."

They have played at Electric Picnic, Castlepalooza, Indiependence, Hard Working Class Heroes, ArcTanGent, Stendhal, Vantastival and Camden Crawl.

Their debut album was mostly instrumental, with vocals from The King's Hospital Choir and Straffan Lads Choir, and instrumentation from members of the RTÉ National Symphony Orchestra. Most of it was recorded in Písek, Czech Republic, in 2012–13. Released in 2016, Learning to Growl was nominated for the Choice Music Prize.

Bassist Joe Panama left the group in 2016.

Drummer Ben Garrett left the group in 2024 before the release of their second album "I Leave You This", which was voted "Best Post-rock Album 2024 by Where Post Rock Dwells. They signed to Nice Weather For Airstrikes in 2024. Ben Wanders, from Limerick Ireland currently plays drums for the group now.

== Personnel ==
- Vinny Casey (guitar)
- Stevie Darragh (guitar and bass guitar)
- Ben Wanders (drums)
- Luke Daly (vocals, guitar)
- David Prendergast (piano, synths, vocals)

== Discography ==
EPs

- Lads With Sticks (2011)
- Mr Dog (2011)

Albums

- Learning to Growl (2016)
- I Leave You This (2024)
