= Stendhal Festival =

Festival in Limavady, Northern Ireland

Stendhal Festival, originally formed in 2008 by Ross Parkhill & John Cartwright, was a festival to showcase local music across 3 days in Limavady, Northern Ireland. Bands such as And So I Watch You From Afar, Overhead, The Albatross have played.

The festival reformed as Stendhal Festival of Art in 2011 by the founders Ross Parkhill, John Cartwright and Colm O'Donnell, as a platform for local artists to perform alongside acts such as Turin Brakes at Ballymully Cottage Farm in Limavady. The festival was named after Stendhal syndrome.

Attendance numbers of the festival have increased year on year, with the festival winning Best Small Festival in 2013–2015, Best Family Friendly Festival 2014 in Ireland and nominated for the UK Festival Awards in 2016. The festival is built and run by volunteers from the local area.

Now in its 15th year it continues to showcase Irish artists and grass roots musicians alongside global acts.
