= Gallops (band) =

Welsh band

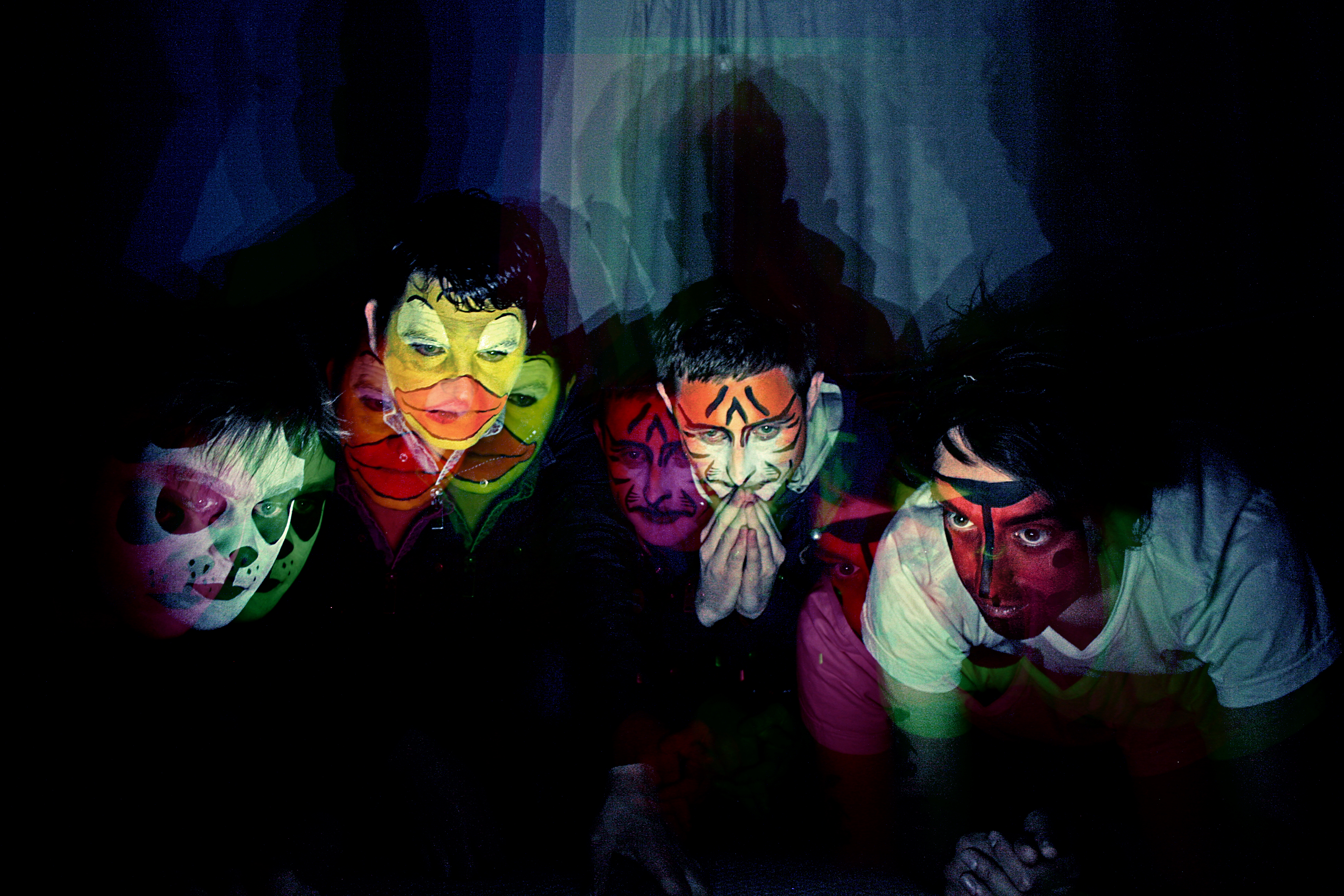
- Gallops 2016

Background information
- Origin: Wrexham, Wales
- Genres: Experimental rock, Electronica, Noise rock, Math rock
- Years active: 2007–2013 2016–present
- Labels: Blood and Biscuits
- Members: Mark Huckridge; Liam Edwards; Brad Whyte
- Past members: Paul Maurice; Dave Morait
- Website: www.gallops.bandcamp.com

Gallops are a British experimental rock and electronica band from Wrexham, Wales, that formed in 2007. They split-up in 2013 and reformed in 2016.

== History ==
Groups formed in late 2007. Their first demo was home recorded and titled "Crutches"; this gained the attention of BBC Introducing in the UK within a couple of months of the band forming. In 2009 an early recorded version of their track "Lasers" appeared on Huw Stephens Music Sounds Better with Huw Vol. 1 compilation released via Wichita Recordings.

In 2010, the band headlined the BBC Introducing stage at Reading and Leeds Festivals In the same year they released a self-titled EP/7" double A-side and their track "Miami Spider" was used in an O2 television commercial in Germany.

In 2011, Gallops toured extensively and performed well-received showcases at South by Southwest in Austin and The Great Escape Festival in Brighton. As well as supporting Deerhunter, Battles, Maps and Atlases and 65daysofstatic at shows in Europe. In April 2012 they performed at Kaikoo Popwave festival in Tokyo alongside OOIOO, Envy and Melt-Banana before their headline tour of China in July.

Their debut album Yours Sincerely, Dr. Hardcore was released on 10 December 2012 on Blood and Biscuits records.

On 28 April 2016, Gallops announced they were reforming. They also announced a live date at Arctangent 2017 and the recording of a second album. Fans are still eagerly waiting for their 3rd album after an excruciating 3-year wait.

== Band members ==
- Mark Huckridge – guitar, electronics, keyboards, percussion (2007–)
- Liam Edwards – drums (2015–)
- Brad Whyte – guitar, keyboards (2007–)

== Discography ==
Studio albums

- Yours Sincerely, Dr. Hardcore (2012)
- Bronze Mystic.. (2017)

EPs

- S/T (2010)

Singles

- "Joust" / "Eukodol" (2011)
- "Darkjewel" (2016)
- "Crystal Trap" (2017)
