= Battlesnake =

Australian heavy metal band

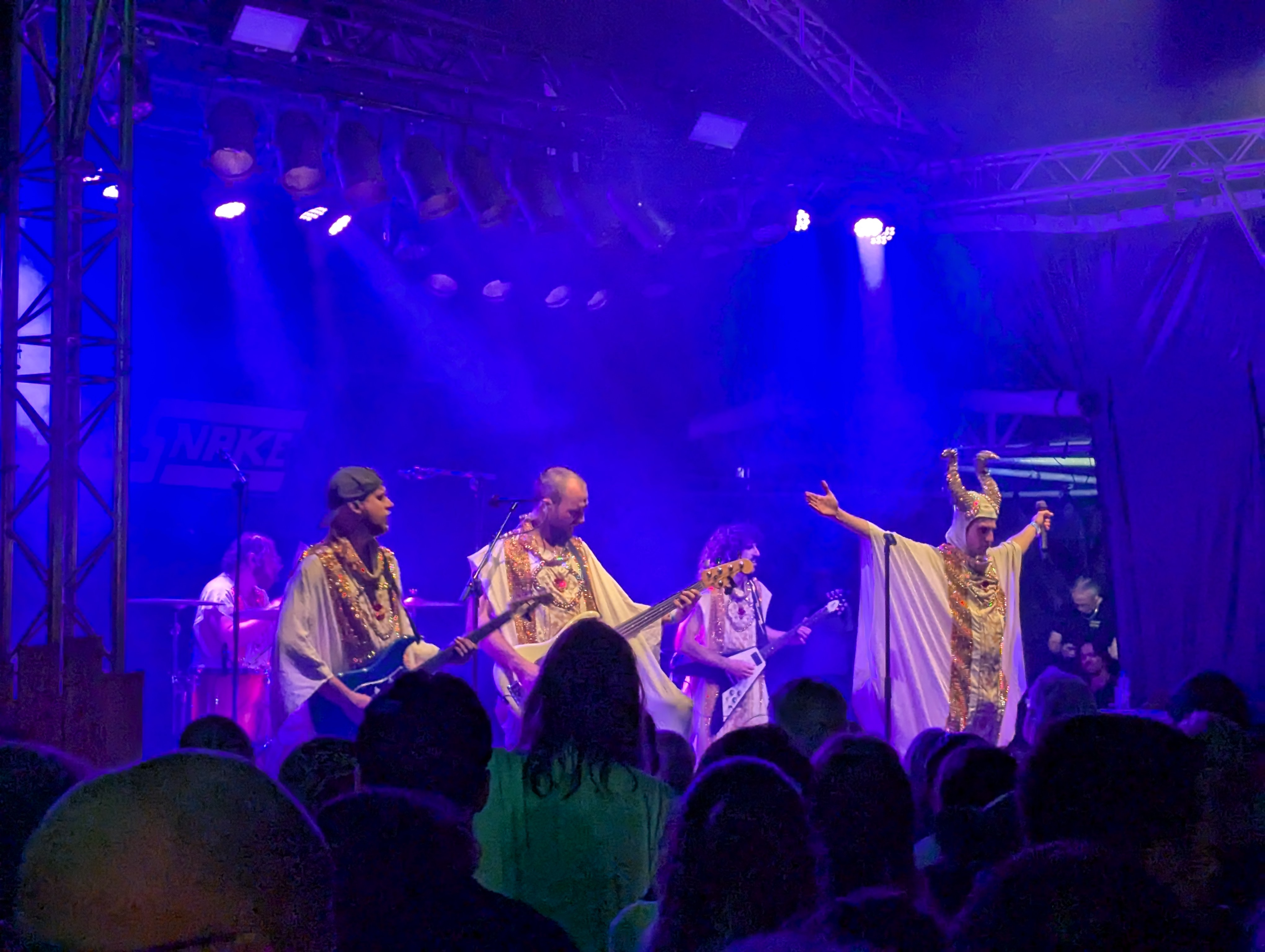
- Battlesnake at the Valkhof Festival 2025

Background information
- Origin: Sydney, New South Wales, Australia
- Genres: Heavy metal
- Years active: 2017–present
- Members: Ben Frank; Billy O'key; Daniel Willington; Elliott Hitchcock; Nick Zammitt; Sam Frank
- Website: www.battlesnake.com.au

Battlesnake is an Australian heavy metal band from Sydney, formed in 2017. The band consists of vocalist and guitarist Sam Frank, guitarists Ben Frank and Daniel Willington, drummer Nick Zammit, bassist Elliott Hitchcock, and keytarist Billy O'key. Guitarist and vocalist Paul Mason who was a founding member, departed the band in late 2024.

Their debut EP Myths and Legends from Gorbag's Domain was released on 14 December 2020. They released their first full-length album, self-titled Battlesnake, in May 2023, followed by The Rise and Demise of the Motorsteeple in June 2024.

== History ==
=== 2017–2021: Early years ===
Battlesnake was formed in 2017, inspired by the desire to create a three guitar rock band. The band released their first single, "Nightmare King", on 27 June 2019, followed by "The Atomic Plough" on 12 July 2019 and "Thunder Scud" on 20 March 2020. On 14 December 2020 they released their debut EP Myths and Legends from Gorbag's Domain.

=== 2022–2024: Debut album Battlesnake ===
In February 2022, Battlesnake worked with Xbox ANZ to promote the launch of Total War: Warhammer III, releasing a cover and music video for the song "Death is Like The Winter Chill". In August 2022 the band supported KISS at the End of the Road World Tour in Sydney, Australia. Battlesnake released their debut studio album, self-titled Battlesnake, in May 2023. Later that year they joined The Smashing Pumpkins and Jane's Addiction as a supporting act for the Australian leg of The World Is A Vampire tour.

=== 2024–present: International tours and The Rise and Demise of the Motorsteeple ===
Battlesnake went on their first international tour, playing several shows across the United Kingdom, Belgium and the Netherlands, in May 2024. In June 2024 the band released their second studio album, The Rise and Demise of the Motorsteeple, which they had recorded over 10 days. They embarked on their second international headline tour across Germany and the UK in September 2024. While on tour as a supporting act with New Zealand band Shihad, Battlesnake released the single "The Fathers Of Iron Flesh" on 13 February 2025. On 17 February 2025, Battlesnake announced that their third international tour, The Year Of The Snake, would commence in June 2025 with shows in the UK, Czech Republic, Germany, Denmark, Netherlands, Finland and Switzerland.

== Musical style ==
Battlesnake’s music draws on fantasy and sci-fi themes and incorporates elements of hard and progressive rock and metal. Their lyrics frequently feature frequently feature wizards, dragons and other fantasy subjects, often presented humorously and with references to classic heavy metal. Their live performances incorporate theatrical staging and elaborate costumes.

Influences include bands such as Queen, King Gizzard & the Lizard Wizard, Judas Priest and AC/DC. The band have also described The Lord of the Rings, Mad Max and Dune as sources of inspiration.

== Discography ==
=== Albums ===
List of albums, with selected details
Title	Details
Dawn of the Exultants and the Hunt for the Shepherd	Released: June 2025; Label: Community Music (CM055); Format: LP, digital

=== Extended plays ===
List of EPs, with selected details
Title	Details
Myths and Legends from Gorbag's Domain	Released: 2020; Label: Balrog Records; Format: LP, digital
Battlesnake	Released: 2023; Label: Balrog Records; Format: LP, digital
The Rise and Demise of the Motorsteeple	Released: June 2024; Label: Format: LP, digital
Dawn Of The Exultants And The Hunt For The Shepherd	Released: June 2025; Label: Format: LP, digital

== Awards and nominations ==
=== AIR Awards ===
The Australian Independent Record Awards (commonly known informally as AIR Awards) is an annual awards night to recognise, promote and celebrate the success of Australia's Independent Music sector.

Year	Nominee / work	Award	Result	Ref.
2026	Dawn of the Exultants and the Hunt for the Shepherd	Best Independent Heavy Album or EP	Nominated	
