= Teeth of the Sea =

British psychedelic rock band

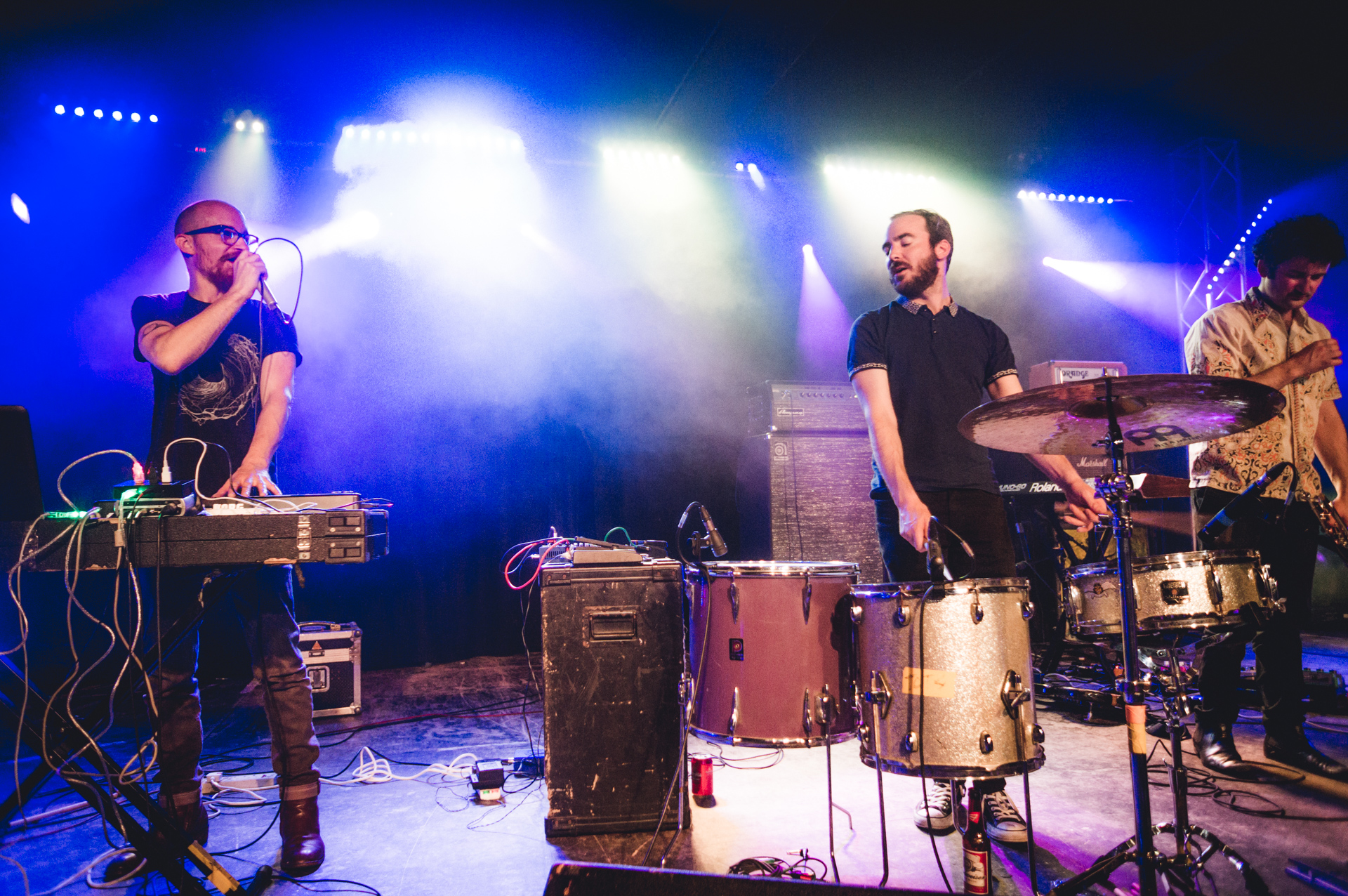
- Teeth of the Sea at Rockaway Beach in 2015

Background information
- Origin: London, England
- Genres: Psychedelic rock; post-rock
- Years active: 2006–present
- Label: Rocket Recordings
- Members: Sam Barton; Mike Bourne; Jimmy Martin
- Past members: John Hirst; Darren Strickland; Mat Colegate

Teeth of the Sea is a British psychedelic experimental rock band. The original members of the band were Sam Barton, Mike Bourne, John Hirst, Jimmy Martin and Darren Strickland.

"Orphaned by the Ocean" was the band's first release in 2009 by which point Darren Strickland had left. Subsequently John Hirst left the band and was replaced by Mat Colegate who appears on their second album "Your Mercury" a year later.

In 2011 they supported Sea Power. Since 2017 they have been a trio with the departure of Colegate. Later work has seen a move to more drone and ambient styles. They have performed live soundtracks at the Science Museum, London and played records and presented on BBC Radio 6 Music.

== Band line-up ==
Current members

- Sam Barton
- Mike Bourne
- Jimmy Martin

Former members

- John Hirst
- Darren Strickland
- Mat Colegate

== Discography ==
- Orphaned by the Ocean (2009)
- Your Mercury (2010)
- Master (2013)
- A Field in England: Re-Imagined (2014)
- Highly Deadly Black Tarantula (2015)
- Wraith (2019)
- Hive (2023)
