= Enemies (band) =

Irish post-rock band

- Origin: Wicklow, Ireland
- Genres: Post-rock, math rock, emo
- Years active: 2007–2016, 2022-present
- Labels: Heavyweight Records (EU), Stiff Slack (JP), Machu Picchu (JP), WhiteNoise (HK), Topshelf (US)
- Members: Lewis Jackson; Mark O’Brien; Eoin Whitfield; Oisin Trench
- Past members: Micheál Quinn
- Website: www.enemiesmusic.com

Enemies are an Irish post-rock band from Wicklow, Ireland.

== History ==
Enemies formed in the summer of 2007. They released their debut EP titled Alpha Waves in 2009 via Machu Picchu Industrias.

In 2010, Enemies released their first studio album titled We've Been Talking via The Richter Collective and Slick Stack.

In 2013, Enemies released their second studio album titled Embark, Embrace via Topshelf Records and Heavyweight Records.

In August 2015, Enemies released a song titled "Play Fire" from their upcoming third studio album.

On 28 September 2016, the band announced the release of their third album, Valuables. The album, released on 9 December of that year, and was their last. The band released a statement declaring the end of the band following their final album.

On 26 July 2022, they reunited.

== Band members ==
Current members

- Lewis Jackson
- Mark O’Brien
- Eoin Whitfield
- Oisin Trench

Former members

- Micheál Quinn

== Discography ==
Studio albums

- We've Been Talking (2010, The Richter Collective, Stiff Slack)
- Embark, Embrace (2013, Heavyweight, Topshelf)
- Valuables (2016, Heavyweight, Topshelf)

EPs

- Alpha Waves (2008, Popular Records, Machu Picchu Industrias)
