= Classically Handsome Brutes =

British mathcore band

- Origin: Leeds, England
- Genres: Mathcore; noise rock; math rock; hardcore punk
- Years active: 2012–2020
- Label: Till Deaf do us Party
- Members: Harry Reynolds; Will Cook; Jack Scarlott

Classically Handsome Brutes was a British mathcore trio from Leeds, formed in 2012 by Harry Reynolds, Will Cook and Jack Scarlott.

== Musical style ==
The band's musical style has been described as math rock, mathcore, noise rock, and hardcore punk by critics.

== Members ==
- Harry Reynolds – guitar, vocals (2012–2020)
- Jack Scarlott – bass, vocals (2012–2020)
- Will Cook – drums, Percussion, vocals (2012–2020)

== Discography ==
=== Albums ===
Title	Album details	Type
Prolegomena	Release: 2015; Label: Self-released	EP
Classically Handsome Brutes	Release: 2020; Label: Self-released	EP

=== Singles ===
Title	Details
They Spoke In Cryptics	Released: 2012; Label: Self-Released
"Nice Things"	Released: 2015; Label: Self-Released
"GABBLERATCHET"	Released: 2016; Label: Till Deaf Do Us Party
"Baron Von Sharon"	Released: 2016; Label: Till Deaf Do Us Party

=== Music videos ===
Title	Year	Director
Nice Things	2015	Sam Price
GABBLERATCHET	2016	John Figler
Baron Von Sharon	2016	Harry Reynolds
