= Itoldyouiwouldeatyou =

itoldyouiwouldeatyou
- Origin: London, England, United Kingdom
- Genres: Midwest emo, math rock, punk rock, post-rock, post-hardcore
- Years active: 2014–present
- Label: Alcopop!
- Members: Joey Ashworth; Ollie Greville; Maeve Westall; Connor Freeman; Will Herman
- Past members: Zac; Remy; Lewis; Luke; Josh See; Alexei Berrow

itoldyouiwouldeatyou is a UK based indie-punk band.

== Background ==
In 2019, they compiled features with Master Peace, TeenSlasher91 & Worstworldproblem. These collaborations contributed to their creation of K.O.#1. The band started when lead singer, Joey Ashworth, decided they wanted to start a musical group that represented people they wanted to be like at college. Ashworth chose the name because they "thought it was funny to make ambient music but make it sound like a powerviolence band."

Their composition has fluctuated in recent years.

Their debut album was "Oh Dearism".

Ashworth sings on every song on the album. The album was released with Alcopop! Records and Failure By Design. The Alternative gave them a "Good" album review in November 2018. By 2020, it had already racked up hundreds of thousands of plays on streaming platforms.

They have appeared in the Handmade Festival in 2019 and hosted a special showcase at the Great Escape.

On 28th November 2025, the band released "We were Having Such a Nice Day", a five track EP, as the first part in the rollout of unreleased music created in the six years since their first album.
