= Heck (band) =

British rock band

- Also known as: Baby Godzilla (2009–2015)
- Origin: Nottingham, England
- Genres: Hardcore punk; heavy metal; mathcore
- Years active: 2009–2017, 2022, 2026
- Labels: Npag Industries, I'm Not From London, Origin Records
- Past members: Joe Rawson; Jonny Hall; Paul Shelley; Matt Reynolds; Tom Marsh
- Website: abandcalledheck.com

Heck are a British rock band formed in Nottingham, England, in 2009 under the name Baby Godzilla. The name was changed after a lawsuit from the Japanese film company, Toho, which owns the copyright to the name Godzilla. The band split up in August 2017, announcing a final show scheduled for 17 August.

On 5 July 2022 the bands social media channels were updated and a performance announced at 2000 Trees Festival on 8 July 2022.

== Musical style ==
Heck's musical style has been described as mathcore, punk thrash, thrash metal, punk rock heavy metal, thrashcore, hardcore punk, progressive metal, punk metal, stadium rock, groove metal and borderline grindcore. It has been compared to Iggy Pop, Napalm Death, The Dillinger Escape Plan, Future of the Left, Gallows, Pulled Apart by Horses and The Chariot.

== Members ==
=== Final line-up ===
- Jonny Hall – vocals, rhythm guitar (2011–2017, 2022, 2026)
- Matt Reynolds – vocals, lead guitar (2009–2017, 2022, 2026)
- Paul Shelley – backing vocals, bass guitar (2009–2017, 2022, 2026)
- Tom Marsh – drums (2009–2017, 2022, 2026)

=== Past members ===
- Joe Rawson – vocals, rhythm guitar (2009–2011)

== Discography ==
Title	Album details	Type
NPAG	Released: 2010; Label: Origin Records; Moniker: Baby Godzilla	EP
Oche	Released: 2012; Label: I'm Not From London; Moniker: Baby Godzilla	LP
Knockout Machine	Released: 2013; Label: Origin Records; Moniker: Baby Godzilla	EP
Instructions	Released: 2016; Label: Npag Industries; Moniker: HECK	LP

=== Music videos ===
Title	Year	Director
"At the Oche"	2011	David Louis Lankester
"Powerboat Disaster"	2012	David Louis Lankester
"A Good Idea Realised"	2013	David Louis Lankester
"Trogloraptor"	2013	–
"Don't Touch That Dial"	2013	David Louis Lankester
"Pig"	2013	David Louis Lankester
"The Great Hardcore Swindle"	2014	David Louis Lankester
"The Breakers"	2015	Dan Sturgess
"Brain"	2015	–
"Good As Dead"	2016	David Louis Lankester
"Mope"	2016	Dan Sturgess
