= God Mother =

Swedish band

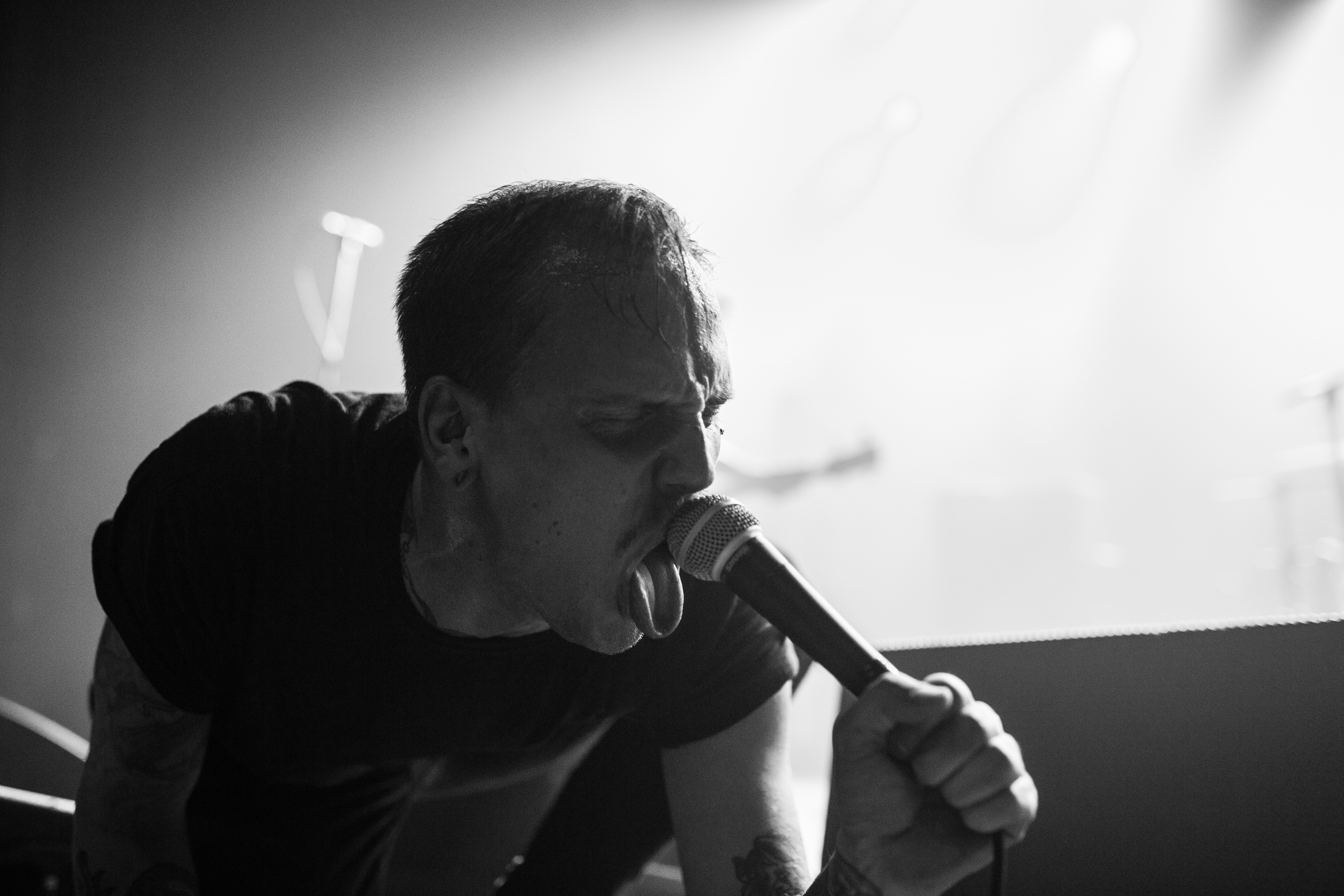
God Mother during the tour with The Dillinger Escape Plan, Brussels, 2017.

God Mother is a Swedish hardcore band formed in Stockholm in 2012.

== History ==
God Mother was founded 2012 by Michael Dahlström (drums), Daniel Noring (bass) and Jonatan Lindgren (guitar). The group wanted to start a band with the focus on intensity and aggression with influences from hardcore, grindcore, metal and sludge. Their first EP, Imitation, released in 2013, had lead vocals by Dahlström. Later that year the band hired Sebastian Campbell to sing and they released the single "Inga Budskap Kvar." Jonatan Lindgren chose to leave the band in 2015 and was replaced by Max Lindström on guitar.

The band toured extensively in 2014. God Mother became one of the first Swedish hardcore bands to play in Guatemala and Nicaragua.

In 2015, they released their first album, Maktbehov, to widespread critical acclaim. They followed up the record by touring in Sweden, Central Europe and South Africa.

In 2016, they released a split 7-inch vinyl EP with Britons band Artemis on WOOAAARGH Records, SmithsFoodGroup, and Dingleberry Records. They also headlined a tour in South Africa and did a small tour with Cult Leader in Sweden.

God Mother supported The Dillinger Escape Plan on their two Sweden dates in February. Ben Weinman invited them shortly after to play the Party Smasher Showcase at South by Southwest in Austin, Texas. The show marked the band's American debut. Party Smasher Inc announced in July that they had signed the band. The band toured with The Dillinger Escape Plan during their last tour in Europe and the United States. They also played at the Brutal Assault festival.

== Members ==
=== Current ===
- Daniel Noring – bass (2012–present)
- Michael Dahlström – drums (2012–present), vocals (2012–2013)
- Max Lindström - guitar (2015–present)
- Sebastian Campbell - vocals (2013–present)

=== Previous ===
- Jonatan Lindgren – guitar (2012–2015)

== Discography ==
Album

- Maktbehov (2015)
- Vilseledd (2017)

EP

- Imitation (2013)
- Split EP with Artemis (2016)
- Obeveklig (2022)

Singles

- Inga Budskap Kvar (2013)
- Blodfors (2015)
