= Nordic Giants =

English instrumental post-rock duo

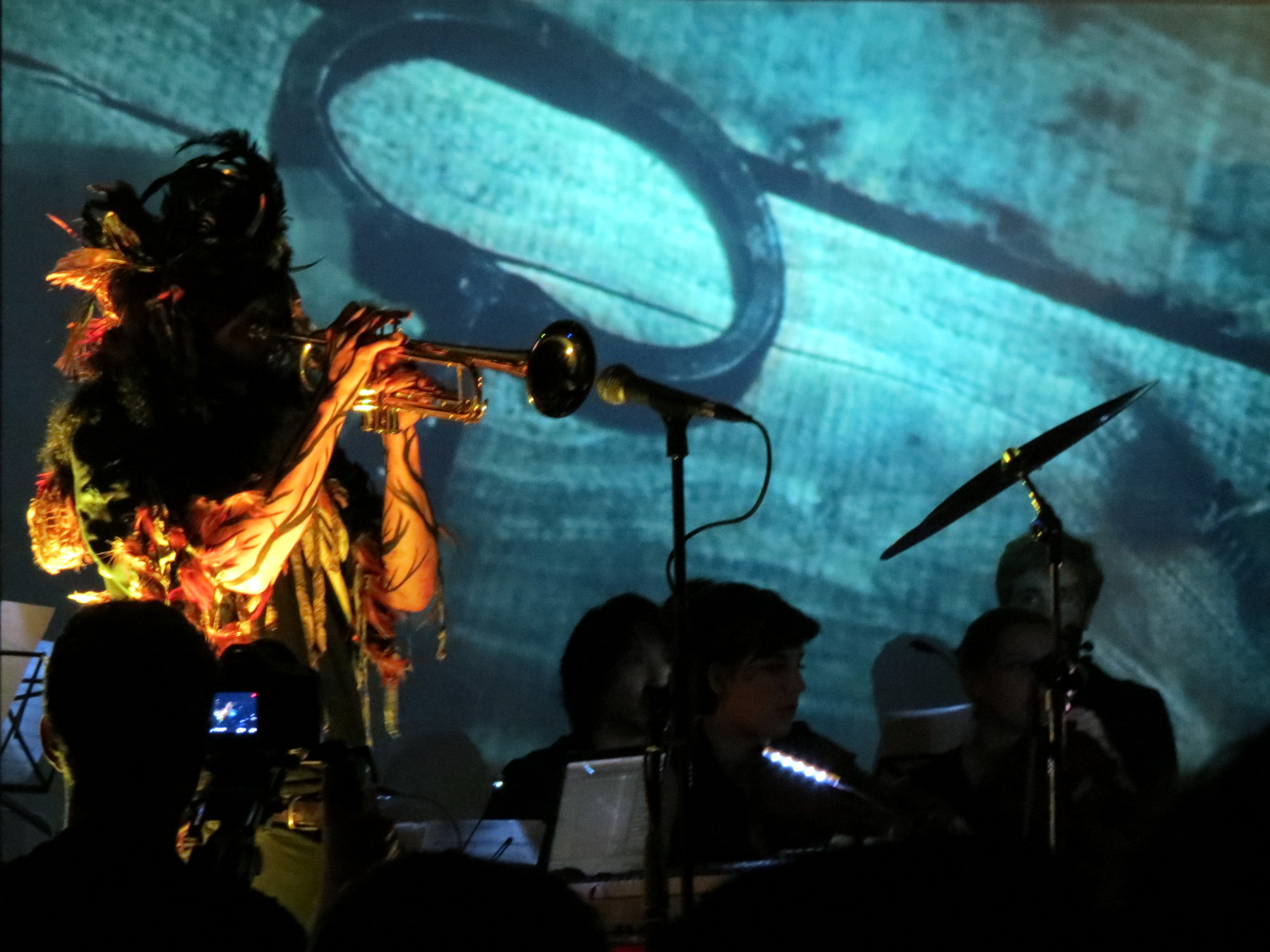

Background information
- Origin: England
- Genres: Post-rock, ambient, instrumental rock
- Years active: 2010–present
- Label: Kscope
- Members: Loki; Rôka
- Website: nordicgiants.co.uk

Nordic Giants are an instrumental post-rock duo from England who include prominent cinematic aspects into the performances and videos. The band released three EPs and a single on their own label before signing to Kscope in 2014. Since then they have released one compilation and two studio albums which featured a number of guest vocalists. The band have toured internationally.

== Biography ==
The duo formed at the start of the 2010s. In October 2010 they self-released their debut EP A Tree As Old As Me that featured vocals by Jake Reid and Cate Ferris, who also featured on the single "Shine" released two years later. In October 2013 the band put out a double EP entitled Build Seas and Dismantle Suns, which was re-released on vinyl a year later. In September 2014, the duo signed with Kscope Records. They released the single "Rapture" featuring vocalist Beth Cannon in January 2015.

On 27 April 2015 the band released their first full-length album, A Séance Of Dark Delusion, which featured vocal contributions from Beth Cannon, Nadine Wild-Palmer, the band Saturday Sun and regular contributor Freyja. The band presented films for all the songs of the album that was preceded by the song "Rapture" featuring Beth Cannon.

On 20 October 2017 the band released their second full-length album Amplify Human Vibration. The album functions as a soundtrack to a short documentary film of the same name. The inspiration and intent of the film and music is "an impassioned plea to humankind to focus on the positive aspects of our existence... to bring light to the positive changes that people are making, to explore the kindness and drive of humanity."

The duo's live performance involves wearing masks and the use of cinematic projections that accompany their instrumental pieces. On occasion the singer Freyja has joined them on stage. Much of their material includes soundtracks for film, like for instance ‘Last Breath’ by David Jackson. The band have played a number of European festivals and toured with Sólstafir, God Is An Astronaut, 65daysofstatic and Public Service Broadcasting.

== Discography ==
=== Studio albums ===
- A Séance of Dark Delusions (Kscope, 2015)
- Amplify Human Vibration (Kscope, 2017)
- Symbiosis (self-released, 2022)
- Under Celestial Alignments (self released, 2026)

=== EPs ===
- A Tree as Old as Me (self-released, 2010)
- Build Seas (self-released, 2013)
- Dismantle Suns (self-released, 2013)

=== Singles ===
- "Speed the Crows Nest" (self-released, 2013)
- "Shine" (self-released, 2012)
- "Rapture" Ft. Beth Cannon (self-released, 2015)

=== Compilations ===
- Build Seas, Dismantle Suns (Kscope, 2014)
