= The Physics House Band =

Band formed in Brighton, UK

- Origin: Brighton, England
- Genres: Progressive rock, experimental rock, psychedelia
- Years active: 2012–present
- Labels: Blood and Biscuits, Small Pond
- Members: Samuel Organ; Dave Morgan; Miles Spilsbury; Cameron Dawson
- Past members: Adam Znaidi

The Physics House Band are an English band formed in Brighton, England, in 2012. They have released three studio albums, including a live album consisting of previously recorded songs, and two EPs.

== History ==
Formed in 2012, the band comprised multi-instrumentalists Sam Organ and Adam Znaidi and drummer Dave Morgan, who met while studying at University in Brighton, and were initially members of a five-piece band. They initially gained a following from their video for "Titan" on YouTube. The band's debut album, Horizons/Rapture, was released in 2013. Comedian Stewart Lee, in a Sunday Times review of Horizons/Rapture wrote: "This youthful Brighton trio’s debut offers ugly-beautiful instrumental progressive rock that ageing King Crimson fans think no-one can play anymore."

The band's second album, Mercury Fountain, was released in 2017. The title of this album references an Alexander Calder sculpture of the same name that Znaidi saw in Madrid. The album was described in The Independent as "a cataclysmic, cyclical odyssey that spirals in and out of kaleidoscopic pockets, serene ambience and frenetic, apoplectic wig-outs".

In 2018 Saxophonist/multi-instrumentalist Miles Spilsbury joined the group.

On 9 March 2021 the band released a statement saying Adam Znaidi had stepped way from the band the previous year.

The band released a third album Incident on 3rd on 3 December 2021.

The group have toured and performed shows with Alt-J, Jaga Jazzist, Deerhoof, LITE, 65daysofstatic, Three Trapped Tigers, Mono, Omar Rodriguez-Lopez.

The band's music has been described as "psychedelic experimental rock", "psych-rock", and "psychedelic, experimental math-rock". Paul Lister, writing for The Guardian, described them as a "perfect storm of rock, prog, psych, cosmic, tech metal and jazz fusion", stating that the band members played "about 33 instruments" between them.

== Band members ==
- Samuel Organ - Guitars, synthesizers (2012-present)
- Dave Morgan - Drums (2012-present)
- Miles Spilsbury - Saxophone, synthesizers (2012-present)
- Cameron Dawson - Bass (2024-present)

== Past band members ==
- Adam Znaidi - Bass, Guitars, synthesizers (2012-2020)

== Discography ==
Studio albums

- Mercury Fountain (2017, Small Pond Recordings)
- METROPOLIS (May 2019, Unearthly Vision) (Live Album)
- Incident On 3rd (December 2021, Unearthly Vision)

EPs

- Horizons/Rapture (2013, Blood & Biscuits Records)
- Death Sequence (2019, Unearthly Vision)
- METROPOLIS Bootlegs (2020, Unearthly Vision)

Remix albums

- Horizons / Rapture: Remixed (2014, Blood & Biscuits Records / KLDSCP Records)
