= Chinese Football =

Chinese rock band

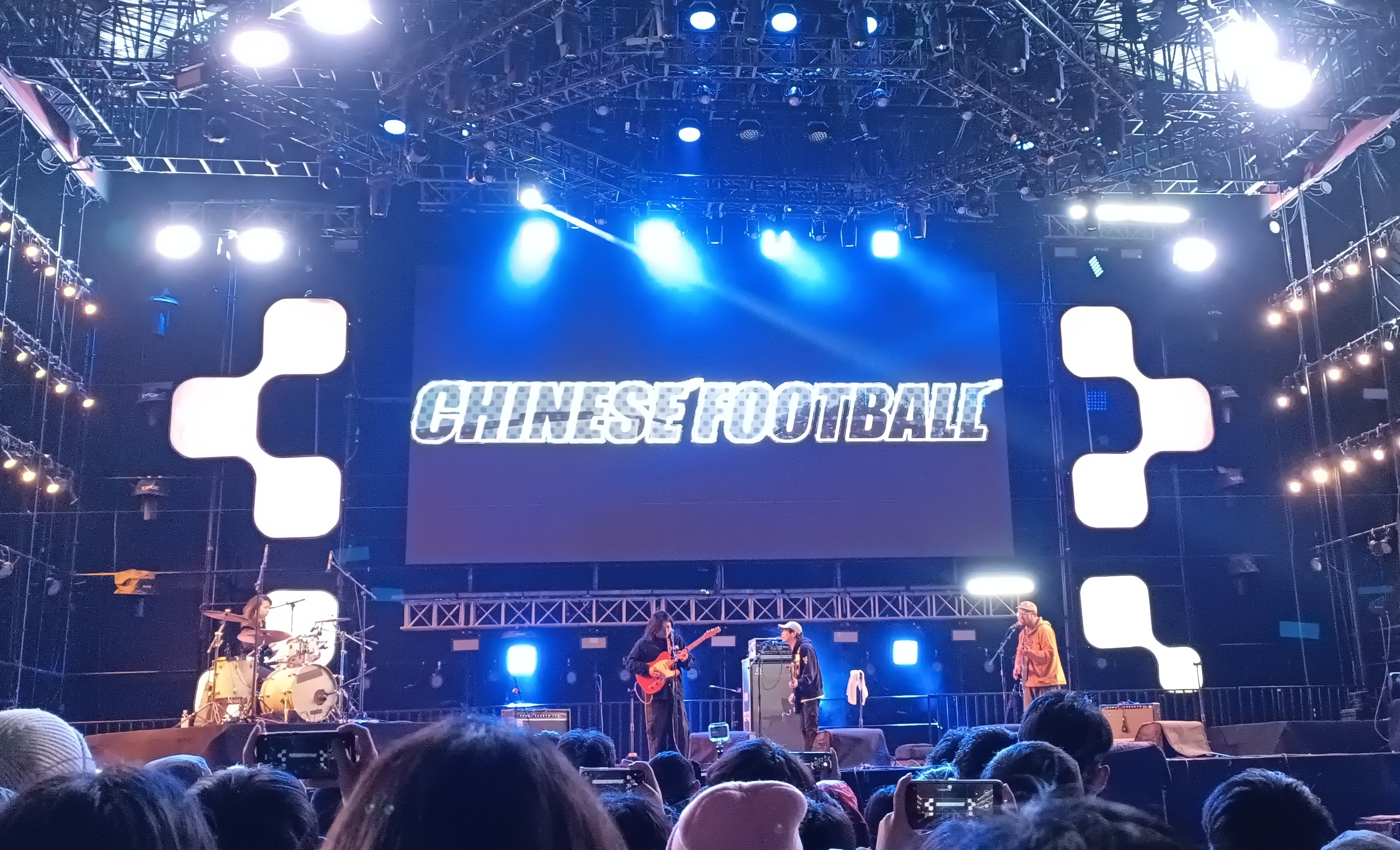

Background information
- Origin: Wuhan, China
- Genres: Chinese rock, indie rock, math rock, Midwest emo
- Years active: 2011–present
- Labels: Wild Records
- Members: Xu Bo; Wang Bo; Li Lixing; Zheng Zili
- Website: Chinese Football on Bandcamp

Chinese Football is a Chinese indie rock and math rock band. It was founded in 2011, in Wuhan, China. The band self publishes their music under Xu Bo's own Wild Records label.

Chinese Football is one of the few indie bands in China to get an international audience. Its style has been described as both math rock and midwest emo.

== Musical style ==
Chinese Football is influenced by pop punk, j-pop, math rock, and midwest emo, with melodies primarily drawing from math rock as well as electronic elements inspired by j-pop. Lead guitarist Xu Bo listed bands Envy, Toe, The Get Up Kids, Jimmy Eat World, The Sea and Cake, and Yo La Tengo as influences, as well as the album 我去两千年 (I Went to 2000) by Pu Shu. Although their name often prompts comparison with American Football, both bands noted that their style was quite divergent, with American Football using more dream pop elements and Chinese Football having more elements of pop punk and math rock.

Describing the lyrical themes of his music, Xu has stated "The lyrics are all about my personal perceptions. confusion, contradiction, frustration… As a small, more or less incompetent person."

== History ==
Chinese Football was founded by Xu Bo and Wang Bo after meeting online via a bulletin board system in 2011, both of them having just left other bands. Xu named the band after the fellow emo-math rock band American Football, although the band is not well known in China (Xu noted that Chinese fans wondered if they played football).

Chinese Football released their first album in 2015, the self titled Chinese Football.

The band is known for their album covers, which feature anime versions of the band members drawn by a friend of Xu Bo under the pseudonym Space Layout.

The band created a trilogy of EPs themed around video games, called the Game trilogy. The first one was called Here Comes a New Challenger, the second was Continue?, and the third was Win & Lose. The album had a meta theme about Xu Bo's desire to become a famous rockstar.

Continue? was released in 2019, and there were two music videos for the songs "Continue" and "Electronic Girl". The album's music was recorded in their hometown in Wuhan.

In 2019, the band opened for its inspiration American Football during their world tour in the cities of Beijing, Shanghai, and Hong Kong.

In summer 2021, the band started recording their first full length album since 2015, titled Win & Lose. They started a tour to promote the album around China in October 2021, although restrictions due to the COVID-19 pandemic in China caused delays. While the album was originally meant to be released that fall, Xu Bo delayed it to 2022 due to "not being completely satisfied" with the album at the time. Win & Lose had a mixed reception in China, with its more pop sound leading to fans dubbing the band "traitors". However, the album sold well, reaching the top of the math rock section of Bandcamp.

In June 2024, Chinese Football announced their first tour in North America, which they scheduled for October of the year.

== Discography ==
- Chinese Football EP (2015)
- Chinese Football (2015)
- Here Comes a New Challenger! (2017)
- Continue? (2019)
- Win & Lose (2022)

== Band members ==
- Xu Bo – guitar & vocals
- Li Lixing – bass & vocals
- Wang Bo – guitar
- Zheng Zili – drums
