= Møl =

Danish blackgaze band

- Origin: Aarhus, Denmark
- Genre: Blackgaze
- Years active: 2013–present
- Label: Nuclear Blast
- Members: Kim Song Sternkopf; Nicolai Hansen; Holger Rumph-Frost; Ken Klejs; Sigurd Kehlet
- Past members: Steffen Rasmussen; Johan Klejs; Frederik Lippert

Møl, stylized as MØL, is a Danish blackgaze band from Aarhus formed in 2013. The band consists of vocalist Kim Song Sternkopf, guitarists Nicolai Hansen and Sigurd Kehlet, bassist Holger Rumph-Frost, and drummer Ken Klejs.

In 2014, the band released a self-titled demo EP on the Russian underground label Cvlminis, a subsidiary of Rigorism Production. Another EP, II, followed in November 2015. After signing a record deal with Holy Roar Records, the band released their debut album, Jord, in April 2018, which was released in the United States by Deathwish Inc.

On 23 July 2021, the group released a new single, "Photophobic," along with a music video and announced that they had signed with Nuclear Blast. They also revealed that their second album, Diorama, would be released on November 5 of the same year.

On 1 January 2025, it was announced that Sigurd Kehlet, who had been playing guitar live since August 2019, would become a full band member.

Their third studio album, Dreamcrush, was released on 30 January 2026, also via Nuclear Blast. The singles "Garland", "Young" and "Crush" were released on 16 October 2025, 20 November 2025 and 12 January 2026, respectively, in preparation for the album.

== Band Members ==
=== Current Members ===
- Ken Lund Klejs - drums, percussion (2013-present)
- Nicolai Hansen - guitar (2013-present)
- Holger Rumph-Frost - bass (2016-present)
- Kim Song Sternkopf - vocals (2016-present)
- Sigurd Kehlet - guitar (2025-present, touring 2019-2025)

=== Former Members ===
- Johan Klejs - bass (2013-2016)
- Steffen Rasmussen - vocals (2013-2016)
- Frederik Lippert - guitar (2013-2024)

== Discography ==
=== Albums ===
- Jord (2018)
- Diorama (2021)
- Dreamcrush (2026)

=== EPs & Demos ===
- Møl (2014)
- II (2015)
