= Damián Antón Ojeda =

American musician

Damián Antón-Ojeda
- Also known as: Thét Älëf Nönvéhhklëth detna hacëntera Trha, Jôdhrhä dës Khatës, Dlhâvênklëth fëhlätharan ôdlhënamsaran Ebnan, Damián Jadësh Yyven, Elisa
- Born: July 31, 1997 (age 29)
- Origin: Oak Park, Illinois
- Genres: Blackgaze; black metal; atmospheric black metal; screamo; emocore; post rock; noise rock; melodic death metal (early); trance metal (early); electrogrind (early); depressive suicidal black metal
- Years active: 2008-present

Damián Antón-Ojeda (born July 31, 1997) is a Mexican-American singer and multi-instrumentalist based in Baltimore, Maryland. He has performed under thirty seven projects, the most known being black metal-adjacent Sadness, Trhä, a mainly raw black metal project, and Life, which is described as a fusion of screamo, post hardcore and atmospheric black metal.

Ojeda often writes in his own conlangs, such as HaΩaj, Jeuth Ryãvûln, Kada£, Thëhht Dehël'hjän, and Luclürh which he describes as 'deeply rooted in his own person and emotions' and primarily uses for Trhä.

Ojeda began experimenting with music at the age of eleven, in 2008, which he recently released on a compilation album called "unused music" in 2022. By 2012 he had begun publishing his music under various YouTube channels associated with each corresponding project. Ojeda also briefly had a trance metal project called Alephace. While living in Oak Park, Illinois, Ojeda was also a member of bands Born an Abomination and Kaskaskia, both formed with Tony Hicks, the former lasting from 2012 to 2018, Damian's first prominent musical project or band, and the latter lasting from 2018 to 2024. The band's sound combined depressive black metal with melodic death metal and metalcore. He also briefly had a cybergrind project called Refisteuriv in 2012.

== Discography ==
The discography of Ojeda consists of the many solo projects and bands he has been in or has worked on.

=== Sadness ===
- 2014: Close, Fading Days Away…, To Despair of…
- 2015: …and Longing Are the Endless Waves, Distances…, Greyness of a Young Despondency, Distances..., The Rain that Falls Alone, Wounded Solitude
- 2016: Acjétêc, Such a Short Time…, Somewhere Along Our Memory, To have ever had, Mariposa, Demo 11, Tundra, Rose / Lavender, An Open Letter/Sadness (Split)
- 2017: Otro, Leave, Imperfect (Split), Sun into water
- 2018: Rain
- 2019: Circle of Veins, I Want to Be There, Sounds Of Melancholy (Split)
- 2020: Atna, Alluring the Distant Eye, Hiraeth (Split), Holding
- 2021: Agnosia (Split) Rain Chamber, Ataraxy (Split), motionless, watching you, April Sunset, _____
- 2022: Sadness/Unreqvited (Split), old songs 2015, Tortuga, I, within the lightseam, old songs 2014, our time is here, kiss in october, daydream flowers (Split)
- 2023: sadness // for her... (Split), springgarden (Split), sadness // abriction (Split), old songs 2013, cherish (Split), summerset streetlights (Split), Remembering distant stars (Split), Secret Green (Split), Sadness / Vulning (Split), springnight moment (Split), Resplendence (Split), while you're still (Split)
- 2024: the most beautiful girl in the world, your perfect hands and my repeated words, I Want to Make Something as Beautiful as You, I Love You, Burning As The First Light (Split)
- 2025: Magogaio/Sadness (Split), that lasts forever (Split), Lux (Split), shimmer
- 2026: spring 2025, sunset blush

=== Trhä ===
- 2020: Nvenlanëg, novej qalhnjënno
- 2021: lhum jolhduc, Endlhëtonëg, edënohhdlha hálgra tu majtranlh'ha / ga nëcëcta mon idlhi, inagape
- 2022: tálcunnana dëhajma tun dejl bënatsë abcul’han dlhenic ëlh inagat, jahadlhë adrhasha indauzglën nu dlhevusao ibajngra nava líeshtamhan ëf novejhan conetc danëctc qin, ëf tu dlhicadëtrhënna bë ablhundrhaba judjenan alhëtangrasë shidandlhamësë inqom, mã Héshiva õn dahh Khata trhândlha vand ëfd datnen Aghen Ecíës drhãtdlhan savd, vat gëlénva!!!, endlhëdëhaj qáshmëna ëlh vim innivte
- 2023: Die Macht Der Feenflamme (Split), Eliante // Trhä (Split), Starcave Nebula // Trhä (Split), Sankaku // Trhä (Split), abcu (Split), Trhä // Μνήμα (Split), lhum'adsejja', im ëmat gan líeshtam namvajno, rhejde qhaominvac tla aglhaonamëc, §ºanΩë aglivajsamë cá nëlh¶iha i eddana pi¶e, alëce iΩic, nêbamducel cánsë ulan da gunej, enΩëcunna edëno£sa qud∫ë∫, av◊ëlajnt◊ë£ hinnem nihre, zäckar / novaj ilan (Split), Trhä // Sunset (Split)
- 2024: nêbamΩejn, ∫um'ad∂ejja cavvaj, di najb tu natálja ibajnma ëct / lämèàen'th (Split), faj den EnΩëtonëghappan nvona Tóvarba dëhajnva ëfpalte∫ eh yënáº£les §anënbe cetmac eh den léhams selb'ºe nêbam'o∫nëb ◊u∫an d‡éf§
- 2025: ∫um'ad∂ejja ∫ervaj, ducel ëf ∂acet'asde§ den alëcaáhabna ë∫ igatenamëc. ja sjaboj. ja qá§mëna. ëmat'alsob nimëde eh enΩëcunnab nipi¶e, di nido jad - ◊untwan law¶ur dëhajt◊ejn - a∫ëtana lín bë, Trhä & Midoran (Split), lact’eben, Barbelith/Trhä (Split), tahaccet ga qëcha com ibajn
- 2026: din cëppehen lëvatsë ë∫ nu debu£ gjërima, ∫um'ad∂ejja o§tovaj, Trhä / Keys to the Astral Gates and Mystic Doors (Split)

=== Life ===
- 2017: demo
- 2018: demo two
- 2020: demo three, demo four
- 2021: coma garden, demo five
- 2025: demo six, ...and still it flutters, my heart the dreaming memory, parking lot (mineral cover), demo seven, demo eight, demo nine, drifting in the moonlight. it became even louder than before, we won't say a word until tomorrow, demo ten, demo eleven, demo twelve, body shirt / life (Split)
- 2026: september 2025 (demo thirteen), rerecordings, I.L.Y (Split), limer

=== Comforting ===
- 2019: I was in room 1024, ENDGARDEN, i'm a failure, legfield
- 2020: Separation, Tantrum
- 2021: s/t I
- 2022: Comforting//CØL (Split), Espièglerie/Comforting (Split), Untitled

=== Born an Abomination ===
- 2012: Suicide Garner
- 2013: Winter Depression, Eve of Mourning, Sorrow Within These Walls..., Seasonal Depression, Nostalgia
- 2014: Spilled Into This Disgrace Of World (Split)
- 2015: Meadow
- 2016: Fires in the night hour...
- 2022: 2013

=== Kaskaskia ===
- 2019: Winter tresses
- 2021: Fleecian Winter Majesty
- 2023: Autumnal Fleecian Spirit

=== Ser ===
- 2013: Loving..., Eria, Her sole departure, Ebnele, Lánima, Like a Higanbana to the Elegy
- 2018: In Fade of Memories..., Âvééchrhûlein aun Ryánlhem, Elope and Forgotten

=== Liminal Dream ===
- 2016: Drifting, A Train in Desolation
- 2021: Luna (demo), Untitled
- 2022: Mind, Unreleased demo 2016

=== left alone... ===
- 2015: Demo, Einsam und Verloren, Home find me...., ... as the birds still fly..., With her in winter autumn
- 2016: Empty moment, With black branches.. scars and wounds, the painful memories...

=== i will always remember ===
- 2016: I'm sorry
- 2017: Demo

=== letterstoyou ===
- 2025: and crying impulse, feral growth at the side of mystery, letterstoyou, lunar memory scars
- 2026: ...maybe someday became today, moonlight, a promise, treasure, forward memory

=== Evocative Atmosphere ===
- 2013: When a Broken Crow Looks Back on its Path in Hope to Fly Again

=== rpg'97 ===
- 2022: Demo Otoño '22
- 2023: Demo Invierno '23, In the Chasm House of Flies
- 2025: Vol III

=== youreyesinmine ===
- 2025: s\t

=== East Avenue ===
- 2018: Algorhythm

=== A Nightlit Poesy ===
- 2013: Waiting, Brittle Structure

=== home is in your arms ===
- 2024: home is in your arms, home is in your arms, _
- 2025: home is in your arms // nostalgique (Split), _, _, _, _
- 2026: home is in your arms

=== pitfallsatthirdlaw ===
- 2026: Demo

=== Midwinter Sunset ===
- 2026: Midwinter Sunset 1, Midwinter Sunset 2

== Personal life ==
Ojeda once used the name Elisa in their private life, which led early Sadness releases to be credited that way; they stopped using it in November 2014.
