= Holy Fawn =

American rock band

- Origin: Phoenix, Arizona
- Genres: Blackgaze; shoegaze; post-black metal; post-rock
- Years active: 2015–present
- Labels: Triple Crown; Wax Bodega
- Members: Ryan Osterman; Evan Phelps; Alexander Rieth
- Past members: Austin Reinholz
- Website: holyfawn.com

Holy Fawn is an American rock band from Phoenix, Arizona. The band currently consists of guitarist and vocalist Ryan Osterman, guitarist Evan Phelps, and bassist Alexander Rieth, who was part of the lineup until 2023 before returning in 2025. Drummer Austin Reinholz was a member until 2025. They have released two full-length studio albums and two extended plays.

== History ==
Holy Fawn guitarist and vocalist Ryan Osterman began as a musician with the self-described "ghost folk" band Owl & Penny. He left the band as part of a larger movement away from folk music and formed Holy Fawn in Phoenix, Arizona, with bassist Alexander Rieth, guitarist Evan Phelps, and drummer Austin Reinholz. Rieth and Reinholz lived together and invited Osterman and Phelps to their home for a jam session. Osterman recorded their practices, which became the demos for the band's debut extended play (EP), Realms. Realms was released on December 18, 2015. Before forming Holy Fawn, Osterman played guitar with alternative rock band The Maine, while Rieth played in A Distant Calm.

Holy Fawn self-released their debut studio album, Death Spells, on September 14, 2018. In March 2019, Holy Fawn signed with Triple Crown Records, with whom they re-released Death Spells. As part of the re-recording announcement, Holy Fawn also released an official music video for "Dark Stone", one of the tracks on Death Spells.

On January 17, 2020, Holy Fawn released a surprise three-song EP titled The Black Moon. Shortly after the EP's release, Holy Fawn began a North American tour with Drug Church and mewithoutYou as support for Thrice, who were promoting the 15th anniversary of their album Vheissu.

In February and March 2022, Holy Fawn embarked on a North American tour with Midwife as support for Deafheaven. On March 18, 2022, in the middle of that tour, Holy Fawn released the single "Death Is A Relief" via Wax Bodega. The song announcement was accompanied by a music video directed by P. J. Koelbel. "Death Is A Relief" was later revealed to be the lead single off of the band's second LP, Dimensional Bleed, to be released September 9, 2022, via Wax Bodega. The second single from the album, also titled "Dimensional Bleed", was released on July 12. While still rooted in black metal and sludge metal, Dimensional Bleed also incorporated elements of electronic music.

On May 28, 2025, Holy Fawn released a new single, "Beneath a Lightless Star", continuing their exploration of blending atmospheric shoegaze with the heaviness of black metal.

== Musical style ==
Holy Fawn has been described as blackgaze, doomgaze, shoegaze, post-black metal, and post-rock. Osterman acts as the primary songwriter, whose lyrics frequently reference nature imagery. The name of the band is meant to evoke "the sacredness of nature and the presence of psychic connections/extradimensional realms outside of us and within us". They have been compared to Deafheaven and Envy, while taking influences from acts like Slowdive, Band of Horses, Manchester Orchestra, and Deftones.

== Band members ==
=== Current members ===
- Ryan Osterman – guitar, vocals
- Evan Phelps – guitar
- Alexander Rieth – bass (2015–2023, 2025-present)

=== Former members ===
- Austin Reinholz – drums (2015-2025)

== Discography ==
Studio albums

- Death Spells (2018)
- Dimensional Bleed (2022)

EPs

- Realms (2015)
- Whelmed Records Holiday Split Vol. 1 with Gauntly (2016)
- The Black Moon (2020)

Singles

- "Dim" (2016)
- "Reykur" (2016)
- "Arrows" (2017)
- "Drag Me Into The Woods" (2018)
- "hf:/LHPN/seer/REF2.alt" (2020)
- "The Maze" (2020)
- "Death Is a Relief" (2022)
- "Dimensional Bleed" (2022)
- "Void of Light" (2022)
- "Glóandi" (2023)
- "Beneath A Lightless Star" (2025)
