= Radar Festival =

Music festival held annually in Croatia since 2007

Radar Festival is a music festival held annually in Croatia since 2007.

== 2007 festival ==
The festival was held in the Siget neighbourhood of Zagreb, headlined by Kaiser Chiefs, Queens of the Stone Age and Placebo. The groups Howling Bells, Anavrin and Overflow also performed.

== 2008 festival ==
The second edition of the festival was held in Varaždin. Bob Dylan, Manic Street Preachers, Majke, Drago Mlinarec and Vlado Kreslin performed for the festival at Stadion Varteks.

== 2009 festival ==
The third edition was held in Varaždin, with Santana, Solomon Burke, Joe Jackson, Eric Burdon and The Animals, Zoran Predin & Lačni Franc, Voodoo Lizards and Bernard Fowler (as their special guest) performing.
