= Black Peaks =

British rock band

- Also known as: Shrine (2012–2014)
- Origin: Brighton, England
- Genres: Progressive rock; post-rock; heavy metal
- Years active: 2012–2021
- Labels: Rise; RED Music
- Members: Will Gardner; Joe Gosney; Dave Larkin; Liam Kearley
- Past members: Andrew Gosden
- Website: blackpeaks.com

Black Peaks were an English rock band from Brighton.

== History ==
The band formed in 2012, initially under the name Shrine, and released a debut self-released EP Closer to the Sun in 2014.

After a run of UK and European festivals and tours, the band signed to RED Music for the release of their debut album Statues in 2016.

The album was well received, and singles 'Glass Built Castles' and 'Saviour' brought the band support from Zane Lowe, Daniel P. Carter and daytime airplay on BBC Radio 1.

This increased profile resulted in a busy touring schedule across 2016-2017, including dates supporting Deftones, System of a Down, The Dillinger Escape Plan, Prophets of Rage and Mastodon.

Towards the end of 2017, the band announced that they had parted ways with bassist Andrew Gosden, replaced with new member Dave Larkin, and were at the time in the studio recording their second album, titled All That Divides. All That Divides was released in October 2018.

In January 2019, Black Peaks supported UK group Enter Shikari on their second leg of the Stop the Clocks tour.

On 26 July 2021, the band announced that they have decided to break up, citing that they "have reached a point where we don't feel we can continue in a way that is healthy for us."

== Musical style ==
Black Peaks have been described as progressive rock, hardcore punk, heavy metal, math rock, post-rock, alternative rock and sludge metal and have been compared to the likes of Mastodon, Oceansize, System of a Down, Muse, Tool and The Dillinger Escape Plan.

== Members ==
- Will Gardner – lead vocals (2013–2021)
- Joe Gosney – guitars, vocals (2012–2021)
- Dave Larkin – bass guitar (2017–2021)
- Liam Kearley – drums (2012–2021)

== Past members ==
- Andrew Gosden – bass guitar (2012–2017)

== Discography ==
Title	Album details	Type
Closer to the Sun	Released: 2014; Label: Self-Released; Moniker: Shrine	EP
Statues	Released: 2016; Label: RED Music	LP
All That Divides	Released: 2018; Label: Rise Records	LP
