= Svalbard discography =

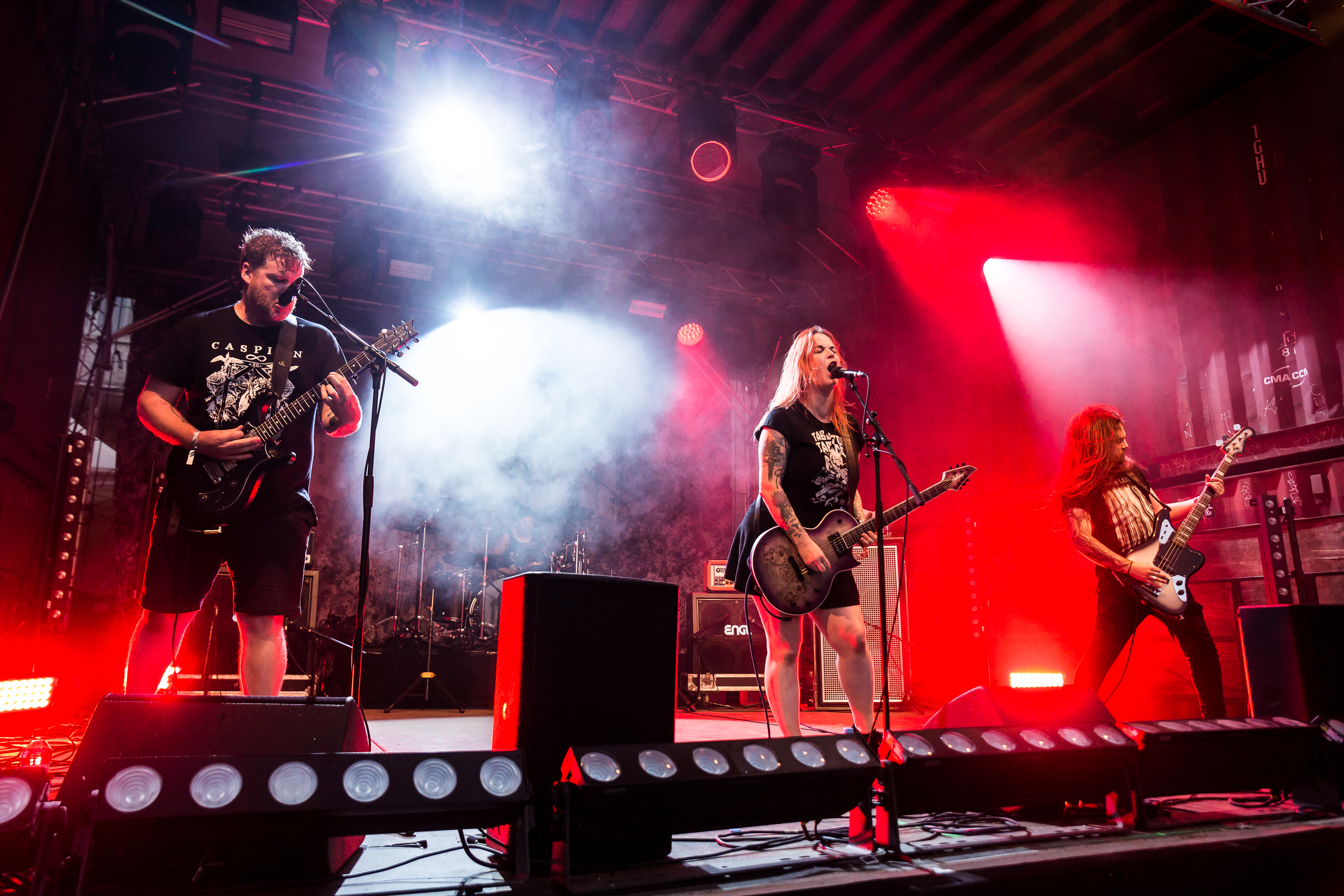
- Svalbard in 2023
- Studio albums: 4
- EPs: 6
- Compilation albums: 1
- Singles: 12
- Music videos: 14

The British post-hardcore band Svalbard released four studio albums, one compilation album, six extended plays (EPs), twelve singles and fourteen music videos. The band were formed in Bristol in 2011 by co-lead vocalists and guitarists Serena Cherry and Liam Phelan with drummer Mark Lilley, and joined by bassist Matt Francis since 2020. Svalbard self-released their eponymous debut in May 2012, followed by the Gone Tomorrow EP in February 2013. Their third extended play, Flightless Birds, was released in October of that year through Tangled Talk Records. Svalbard developed a relationship with fellow post-hardcore band Pariso after touring together in 2013, leading to the release of a split EP in 2014 and their signing to Holy Roar Records, owned by Pariso guitarist Alex Fitzpatrick, in January 2015. The following month, Holy Roar released Discography 2012–2014, compiling all of the band's recorded output up to that point.

Svalbard released their first and second studio albums, One Day All This Will End (2015) and It's Hard to Have Hope (2018), through Holy Roar. In September 2020, after Fitzpatrick was accused of sexual misconduct, Svalbard split from the label and signed to Church Road Records a week prior to the release of their third album When I Die, Will I Get Better? The album brought Svalbard to the attention of Nuclear Blast Records, who signed the band in June 2022 and reissued their back catalogue. Svalbard's fourth and final album, The Weight of the Mask (2023), was their only release to chart in the United Kingdom. The band's final single, "If We Could Still Be Saved", was released in November 2025.

== Albums ==
=== Studio albums ===
List of studio albums, with selected details and chart positions
Title	Album details	Peak chart positions		
Title	Album details	UK Ind.	UK Rock	SCO
One Day All This Will End	Released: 25 September 2015; Label: Holy Roar; Format: CD, LP	—	—	—
It's Hard to Have Hope	Released: 25 May 2018; Label: Holy Roar; Format: CD, LP	—	—	—
When I Die, Will I Get Better?	Released: 25 September 2020; Label: Church Road; Format: CD, LP	—	—	—
The Weight of the Mask	Released: 6 October 2023; Label: Nuclear Blast; Format: CD, LP	29	9	79
"—" denotes a recording that did not chart or was not released in that territory

=== Compilation albums ===
List of compilation albums, with selected details
Title	Album details
Discography 2012–2014	Released: February 2015; Label: Holy Roar; Format: CD, 2×LP

== Extended plays ==
List of EPs, with selected details
Title	EP details
Svalbard	Released: May 2012; Label: Self-released; Format: 7" vinyl
Gone Tomorrow	Released: February 2013; Label: Self-released; Format: 10" vinyl
Flightless Birds	Released: 7 October 2013; Label: Tangled Talk; Format: 7" vinyl
Cover Buzz (with Pariso, Let It Die, Mine)	Released: 14 October 2013; Label: Dog Knights, Enjoyment, Tangled Talk, Cult Culture, Moshtache; Format: 7" vinyl
Pariso / Svalbard	Released: 7 July 2014; Label: Holy Roar, Tangled Talk; Format: LP
Svalbard / The Tidal Sleep	Released: January 2017; Label: Holy Roar, This Charming Man; Format: 7" vinyl

== Singles ==
List of singles
Title	Year	Album	Ref.
"Ripped Apart"	2014	Pariso / Svalbard	
"Disparity"	2015	One Day All This Will End	
"Open the Cages"	2016	Svalbard / The Tidal Sleep	
"Unpaid Intern"	2018	It's Hard to Have Hope	
"Revenge Porn"	2018	It's Hard to Have Hope	
"For the Sake of the Breed"	2018	It's Hard to Have Hope	
"Open Wound"	2020	When I Die, Will I Get Better?	
"Listen to Someone"	2020	When I Die, Will I Get Better?	
"Eternal Spirits"	2023	The Weight of the Mask	
"Faking It"	2023	The Weight of the Mask	
"How to Swim Down"	2023	The Weight of the Mask	
"If We Could Still Be Saved"	2025	Non-album single	

== Music videos ==
List of music videos, with directors, showing year released along with albums
Title	Year	Director	Album	Ref.
"Flightless Birds"	2013	N/A	Flightless Birds	
"Disparity"	2015	Liam Phelan	One Day All This Will End	
"Expect Equal Respect"	2016	N/A	One Day All This Will End	
"Open the Cages"	2016	Liam Phelan	Svalbard / The Tidal Sleep	
"Unpaid Intern"	2018	Liam Phelan	It's Hard to Have Hope	
"For the Sake of the Breed"	2018	Zak Pinchin	It's Hard to Have Hope	
"Open Wound"	2020	N/A	When I Die, Will I Get Better?	
"Listen to Someone"	2020	N/A	When I Die, Will I Get Better?	
"Silent Restraint"	2021	N/A	When I Die, Will I Get Better?	
"Eternal Spirits"	2023	Fraser West	The Weight of the Mask	
"Faking It"	2023	David Gregory	The Weight of the Mask	
"How to Swim Down"	2023	Boy Tillkens	The Weight of the Mask	
"To Wilt Beneath the Weight"	2024	Fraser West	The Weight of the Mask	
"If We Could Still Be Saved"	2025	David Gregory	Non-album single	
