= Greater Than Death =

Studio album by Inhuman Nature
- Released: 25 April 2025
- Studio: The Stationhouse, Leeds, UK
- Genre: Death metal; thrash metal
- Length: 36:53
- Label: Church Road

Inhuman Nature chronology
Inhuman Nature (2019)	Greater Than Death (2025)

Singles from Greater Than Death
- 1. "Possessed to Die" Released: 4 February 2025

Greater Than Death is the second studio album by London-based thrash metal group Inhuman Nature. It was released on 25 April 2025, via Church Road in cassette, vinyl, CD and digital formats.

== Background ==
The album was recorded in Leeds at the Stationhouse studio by James Atkinson. It was mastered by Brad Boatright. Chris Barling of the group commented, "This album is straight-up anthemic violence—fast, relentless, and built for the pit," calling it their "most feral, punishing record yet." "Possessed to Die" was released as a single on 4 February 2025.

== Reception ==
Professional ratings
Review scores
Source	Rating
Distorted	8/10
Kerrang!	4/5

Olly Thomas of Kerrang! described the album as "a riot of violence which eschews slick production or Metallica-chasing choruses in favour of a return to the gritty power of the genre's '80s salad days," noting its "walloping reaffirmation of a genre that refuses to die."

Writing for Distorted, Ellis Heasley referred to it as "a classic, ripping thrash record" that "absolutely nails it and it's basically between this and the recent Doomsday LP for thrash album of the year so far."

== Track listing ==
Greater Than Death track listing
No.	Title	Length
1.	"From the Shadows"	1:38
2.	"Dawn of Inhuman Man"	2:54
3.	"Possessed to Die"	3:53
4.	"Servants of Annihilation"	3:17
5.	"Fortress of Delusion"	5:58
6.	"Lines in the Sand II"	3:54
7.	"Greater Than Death"	4:50
8.	"Mad Man's Cage"	5:05
9.	"The Maze of Eternity"	1:48
10.	"Dead and Buried"	3:36
Total length:		36:53
