= One Day All This Will End =

Studio album by Svalbard
- Released: 25 September 2015
- Recorded: March–April 2015
- Studio: The Ranch Production House (Southampton)
- Genres: Post-hardcore; melodic hardcore
- Length: 33:51
- Label: Holy Roar
- Producer: Lewis Johns

Svalbard chronology
Discography 2012–2014 (2015)	One Day All This Will End (2015)	It's Hard to Have Hope (2018)

Singles from One Day All This Will End
- 1. "Disparity" Released: 31 July 2015

One Day All This Will End is the debut studio album by the British post-hardcore band Svalbard, released on 25 September 2015 through Holy Roar Records. Recorded between March and April 2015 at the Ranch Production House in Southampton with producer Lewis Johns, the album draws influences from post-rock, crust punk and black metal. Its lyrics discuss topics such as regret, sexism, online identity and social media.

Upon its release, One Day All This Will End was well received by critics and quickly sold out its first pressing. To promote the album, Svalbard released music videos for "Disparity" and "Expect Equal Respect" and embarked on tours of Europe and the United Kingdom, alongside performances at the 2016 ArcTanGent and Damnation festivals.

== Background and recording ==
Svalbard began writing material for their debut album at their practice space in early 2014. Lead guitarist and vocalist Serena Cherry wrote all of the lyrics for One Day All This Will End herself, whilst its music was collaboratively worked on between her, guitarist and co-lead vocalist Liam Phelan and drummer Mark Lilley as the band did not have a bassist at the time. Cherry said that the songs on One Day All This Will End went through a "really arduous, meticulous" structuring process in an attempt to "find the best way [...] to give a riff the most impact". Songs were discarded if the band were unable to unanimously agree on them or if they were too "clunky", a process that led the band to discard 75% of their material and sometimes led to conflict between members.

In January 2015, Svalbard were signed to Holy Roar Records by label head Alex Fitzpatrick. The band had previously toured and recorded a split release (in 2014) with Fitzpatrick's band, Pariso. Afterwards, the band recorded One Day All This Will End "in bite-size chunks" between March and April 2015 at The Ranch Production House with producer Lewis Johns, whom produced the Pariso / Svalbard split. In a 2016 interview with Metal Recusants, Cherry described the recording process as "a really comfortable experience" and said that Johns had a better idea of how to capture Svalbard's reverb-heavy sound in the studio due to his previous experience working with the band. The album was mastered by Brad Boatright at Audiosiege Mastering in May 2015.

== Composition ==
One Day All This Will End is a post-hardcore and melodic hardcore album that draws influence from post-rock, crust punk and black metal. Nik Young of Metal Hammer described the album as "angry but reflective, aggressive but also soothing". It features atmospheric, melodic and intense compositions, heavy use of reverb effects, vocal interplay, and clean-sounding production.

Cherry described "Perspective" as an "[attempt] to debunk the myth that you need to appear to be upset to appear to have conviction". "Disparity" draws upon Erving Goffman's ideas about impression management to discuss the gap between "the self within and the preferred self", in reality and on social media. "The Vanishing Point" is about Svalbard's ex-bandmembers, and the disappointment stemming from the band's numerous line-up changes. "Expect Equal Respect" discusses sexism in music, and how the term "female-fronted" reduces musicians to the novelty of their gender instead of focusing on or judging them for their abilities. The song was written as a reaction to an question from an email interview with a blog, asking Cherry if she thought that Svalbard's status as a "female fronted" band in the hardcore scene was "a hindrance or a setback".

According to Cherry, "Unrequited" is about "weakness and regret", and "the kind of words where you never know if they would have been better left unsaid". "The Damage Done" discusses the "genome lag" between humanity's primitive instincts and ever-progressing lifestyles. The song was originally written and recorded for Svalbard's eponymous debut EP in 2012; the band decided to re-record the song as it was a fixture of the band's live setlists and because they felt its themes were still relevant. "Unnatural Light" presents social media as an "opium of the people" in reference to the ideas of Karl Marx; Cherry believed it provided an illusion of action against injustices in the world. The album's final track, "Lily", is a post-rock instrumental named after a cat Cherry rescued from abandonment.

The album's title is derived from a lyric at the end of "Perspective". In an interview with Upset, Cherry said that the album's title was "not a negative statement; it’s an appreciative statement of awareness. [...] It’s a little reminder that there’s worse out there, so appreciate where you are now and what you’ve got. It’s about the good and the bad equally having a shelf life."

== Release and promotion ==
On 13 July 2015, Svalbard announced the release of One Day All This Will End. On 31 July, they released a music video for "Disparity". On 27 August 2015, the band premiered "Unnatural Light" exclusively through the website of Terrorizer. The album was released through Holy Roar Records on 25 September 2015. The album's release was handled by Halo of Flies Records in the United States, and by Through Love Records in Germany. The album's first pressing through Holy Roar (limited to 1000 CDs and 495 vinyl LPs) sold out within days of its release. In April 2022, it was reissued through Church Road Records. In June 2022, Nuclear Blast Records acquired the worldwide rights to the album after Svalbard signed to the label.

In early March 2015, Svalbard toured the United Kingdom supporting Funeral for a Friend; in May, they toured Europe with We Never Learned to Live, before performing at the Temples Festival in Bristol. After playing a one-off show with Celeste in August, Svalbard performed various weekend shows across the United Kingdom from September to December 2015. On 5 February 2016, Svalbard released a music video for "Expect Equal Respect". From 20 May to 2 June 2016, the band toured Europe with Meek Is Murder. The band performed at the ArcTanGent festival in August 2016, and on the Terrorizer stage of the Damnation Festival in Leeds in November.

== Critical reception ==
Professional ratings
Review scores
Source	Rating
Dead Press!	9/10
Drowned in Sound	7/10
Metal.de	7/10
Metal Hammer	3.5/5 stars
Ox-Fanzine	4/5 stars
Rock Sound	8/10
Terrorizer	9/10
Upset	4/5 stars

One Day All This Will End was well received by critics. Mischa Pearlmann of Rock Sound said the album represented melodic hardcore "at its finest". Drowned in Sound's Benjamin Bland commented that although Svalbard's post-hardcore sound was "archetypal", the album's production and musical "nods to the purely visceral nature of hardcore at its best" separated the band from many of their stylistic contemporaries. Nik Young of Metal Hammer similarly praised its cohesive sound and Svalbard's ability to "morph opposing styles together to craft something fresh" without "being gratingly artistic".

Kez Whelan of Terrorizer highlighted Svalbard's improved songwriting and dynamics alongside its "thought-provoking lyrics", the latter which he felt "[added] an extra-dimension to what is undoubtedly one of the finest hardcore records of the year". Martin Schmidt of Ox-Fanzine praised its "consistent and always entertaining" blend of genres and ability to "to touch and equally destroy and build with its emotional power." Metal.de reviewer Herr Møller also praised the album's "emotional" and "haunting" delivery, particularly in regards to its vocals, but found its later tracks weak.

One Day All This Will End placed at number 45 on Metal Hammer's year-end list of the 50 best albums of 2015.

== Track listing ==
All lyrics are written by Serena Cherry; all music is composed by Svalbard.

No.	Title	Length
1.	"Perspective"	5:06
2.	"Disparity"	4:30
3.	"The Vanishing Point"	4:01
4.	"Expect Equal Respect"	4:03
5.	"Unrequited"	4:28
6.	"The Damage Done"	4:02
7.	"Unnatural Light"	4:17
8.	"Lily"	3:21
Total length:		33:51

== Personnel ==
Adapted from liner notes.

Svalbard
- Serena Cherry – lead guitar, vocals
- Liam Phelan – rhythm guitar, bass, vocals
- Tony James – bass (credited but did not perform)
- Mark Lilley – drums
Production
- Lewis Johns – production, mixing
- Brad Boatright – mastering

Artwork

- Serena Cherry – artwork
- Alex Heffernan – layout
