= Cardio-Vascular =

EP by Youves
- Released: 4 May 2009
- Genre: Dance-punk; New Rave
- Length: 23:46
- Label: Holy Roar Records
- Producer: Nick Kinnish

Cardio-Vascular is an EP by British dance-punk band Youves. It was released in the spring of 2009 through Holy Roar Records. The album features mostly newly written material which was written between 2008 and 2009 as the band was going through a member and name change; this being their first release under the name 'Youves'. The album has been released on compact disc and digital download.

It was rated two and a half stars by NME, which stated, "it’s too samey and derivative to be anything other than a blast from the dance-punk past."

== Track listing ==
1. Fully Erect Serve and Protect
2. Aladdins Rave
3. Bigorexic
4. Another Djemba Djemba
5. Superstitious
6. My High Horse Is a Penny Farthing
7. On Probation

== Personnel ==
- Stephen Broadley - Lead Vocals
- Alex Wiezak - Guitar and Backing Vocals
- Michael King - Guitar and Backing Vocals
- Luke Neale - Bass guitar
- Paul Wechter - Drums
