= When I Die, Will I Get Better? =

Studio album by Svalbard
- Released: 25 September 2020
- Recorded: February 2020
- Studio: The Ranch Production House (Southampton)
- Genre: Post-hardcore; post-metal
- Length: 38:41
- Label: Church Road
- Producer: Lewis Johns

Svalbard chronology
It's Hard to Have Hope (2018)	When I Die, Will I Get Better? (2020)	The Weight of the Mask (2023)

Singles from When I Die, Will I Get Better?
- 1. "Open Wound" Released: 7 July 2020; 2. "Listen to Someone" Released: 13 August 2020

When I Die, Will I Get Better? is the third studio album by British post-hardcore band Svalbard, released on 25 September 2020. Recorded in February 2020 with long-time producer Lewis Johns, the album incorporates more of a shoegaze-influenced sound in contrast to Svalbard's previous album It's Hard to Have Hope (2018), as well as more clean singing, vocal harmonies, and complex instrumental parts. Lyrically, it discusses themes of mental health, with a focus on depression, alongside feministic topics including domestic abuse, online sexism and objectification. It was Svalbard's only album with bassist Alex Heffernan.

Originally intended for release through Holy Roar Records, When I Die, Will I Get Better? was ultimately released through Church Road Records after Svalbard severed ties with Holy Roar less than three weeks before its release, when several women accused the label's founder of rape and sexual misconduct. It received positive reviews from critics upon release, and was named one of the best albums of 2020 by BrooklynVegan, Decibel, Kerrang! and Metal Hammer. Most of Svalbard's scheduled tour dates during 2020 were cancelled due to the COVID-19 pandemic; in 2021 and 2022, the band embarked on several tours of Europe and the United Kingdom in support of the album.

== Music, writing and recording ==
Primarily described as a post-hardcore and post-metal album, When I Die, Will I Get Better? has also been described as post-rock, black metal and shoegaze. Expanding on their previous album It's Hard to Have Hope (2018), it features more of an shoegaze-influenced sound that was inspired by, and drew comparisons to, Alcest. Svalbard's lead guitarist/vocalist Serena Cherry said that the band's "heavy parts are heavier and the soft parts are softer" on the album, and that it features more complex guitar leads and percussion. The album has also been noted for its greater focus on clean singing (alongside screamed vocals), and vocal harmonies between Cherry and rhythm guitarist and co-lead vocalist Liam Phelan.

Svalbard wrote most of the album's material over the course of several months in 2019. "Silent Restraint", the first song written for the album, dates back to 2018. As with the band's previous albums, Svalbard collaboratively worked on its music before adding lyrics to their songs. Phelan noted that he and Cherry were "at opposite ends of the spectrum" during the album's writing process; whilst Phelan had met his new romantic partner, Cherry struggled with a major bout of depression, an eating disorder, and her escape from an abusive relationship. Phelan felt that this led to a "complete juxtaposition" between the tone of his riffs and Cherry's lyrics on the album. Once the band finished writing, Svalbard recorded the album in February 2020 with long-time producer Lewis Johns at The Ranch Production House in Southampton.

"Open Wound" details an abusive relationship and the conflicting emotions that the abused may feel. "Click Bait" was written as a response to a 2019 article by Metal Hammer, titled "Metal's most interesting voices are all female – and it's about time", which Cherry criticized for being misleading, using women as rage-bait, and for not interviewing any women. (Note: According to Metal Hammer, the "Metal’s most interesting voices..." article received over 1,300 comments on Facebook within two weeks of its publication, most of which were described as "sadly negative, ignorant or merely [confirming of] why that article needed to be written in the first place." The magazine would later publish a follow-up to the article, featuring Cherry and Ithaca vocalist Djamila Boden Azzouz, to respond to its "most problematic comments". Cherry said that the response article also received negative comments online, but praised Metal Hammer for giving her and Azzouz a platform to call out negativity and sexism towards women in metal.) "Listen to Someone" is a plea for people to take more action and fully listen to those suffering from depression and mental illnesses, instead of telling them to just "speak to someone" else. "Silent Restraint" is about "being stuck and isolated" from people by depression. "What Was She Wearing" targets media outlets "who use their platform to insult women based on their clothing choices", whilst "The Currency Of Beauty" criticizes the values online dating sites promote. Phelan said that both he and Cherry wrote their parts for "Pearlescent", originally intended as an instrumental track, as odes to their romantic partners. Cherry additionally described the song as representing "the light at the end of the tunnel [of depression]".

== Title and artwork ==
The album's title is derived from a children's book of the same name that Cherry found at the Viktor Wynds Museum of Curiosities in London. Cherry associated the album's title with her struggles with depression, as well as people believing that will be forgiven for their sins after their death and the hope that "when sexism, racism, transphobia and homophobia die, we will get better as a society". The album's cover art (drawn by Steve Kingscote) features a deer, representing its feminist aspects and women's fears of being "preyed upon".

== Release ==
When I Die, Will I Get Better? was initially announced for release through Holy Roar Records. On 7 September 2020, less than three weeks before its release date, several women accused the label's founder, Alex Fitzpatrick, of rape and sexual misconduct (allegations which he has denied). Svalbard, along with all of the label's employees and bands, immediately severed ties with the label in response. Cherry, who had experienced sexual harassment in the past, found the allegations distressing. In 2022, she told Stereoboard: "I genuinely contemplated quitting music when the allegations broke. It broke my heart to think that there are people who have worked closely with Svalbard and know we are a feminist band, loud and proud, and are capable of committing such abuse to women. It felt so incredibly two-faced; I felt fooled."

Svalbard considered delaying the album's release after leaving Holy Roar, but decided to release it on its planned release date of 25 September 2020 through Church Road Records. The label, originally founded as a mail-order distributor by Employed to Serve members Justine Jones and Sammy Urwin (the former also an ex-Holy Roar manager), converted itself into a proper record label in order to release the album alongside albums by Palm Reader, Respire and Wowod that were also intended for release through Holy Roar prior to its closure. After reclaiming existing copies of the album from stores, Svalbard and Church Road covered the Holy Roar logo with stickers featuring the Church Road Records' logo. The album's US release was handled by Translation Loss Records, and in Japan by Tokyo Jupiter Records. A portion of the album's initial sales through Church Road were donated to Rape Crisis England and Wales.

== Promotion and touring ==
Svalbard initially promoted When I Die, Will I Get Better? with the release of two music videos for "Open Wound" and "Listen to Someone", on 7 July 2020 and 13 August 2020, respectively. A third video, for "Silent Restraint", was released on 19 March 2021. Svalbard were due to perform 70 to 75 shows before the album's release, including a performance at the Roskilde Festival in Denmark, but these tour dates were either cancelled or rescheduled to 2021 due to the onset of the COVID-19 pandemic in March 2020. Cherry would subsequently find the album's release "unceremonious":

The week we released [When I Die, Will I Get Better?] I said to the guys in [Svalbard], 'Something is missing' because we didn't have that big album-release show that we usually have. [...] You need to see the audience react but, in this instance, you can't go and sit in people's bedrooms and watch them as they listen to your music! So for a month it just didn't feel as if we'd released an album at all because the only feedback we had was social media. That had a level of detachment to it.

On 11 December 2020, Svalbard played their last show with bassist Alex Heffernan, who wanted to concentrate on a career in graphic design, at the Kerrang! K! Pit in London. He was replaced by Matt Francis. It would not be until June 2021 when Svalbard began playing shows again, when they toured Europe as a supporting act for The Ocean. In August 2021, the band played on the main stage of the Bloodstock Open Air festival. On 6 November 2021, Svalbard performed When I Die, Will I Get Better? in its entirety at the Damnation Festival in Leeds, before they embarked on a headlining tour of the United Kingdom supported by Heriot and CLT DRP between 20 November and 18 December 2021. In March 2022, Svalbard embarked on another tour of the United Kingdom with Underdark, Mountain Caller and Monolithian. The band then played various dates across Europe between July and October 2022.

== Critical reception ==
Professional ratings
Review scores
Source	Rating
Decibel	8/10
Distorted Sound	9/10
DIY	3/5 stars
Kerrang!	4/5
Metal Hammer	4.5/5 stars
Metal Storm	8.0/10
New Noise Magazine	4/5 stars
Ox-Fanzine	4.5/5 stars
Rock Hard	7/10
Sputnikmusic	4.5/5

When I Die, Will I Get Better? received mostly positive reviews from critics. The music distribution website Bandcamp listed it as the "Album of the Day" on 30 September 2020. BrooklynVegan reviewer Andrew Sacher called it "an album that's powerful in every sense of the word, and a massive leap from anything in [Svalbard's] already-great catalog." Shawn Macomber of Decibel said that Svalbard had successfully broken away from the "stock and buoyed" sound of their previous albums, noting its "more fully evolved and expanded sense of grandeur and transcendence" and improved vocal interplay between Cherry and Phelan. Matt Mills of Metal Hammer affirmed the album as "the most important British metal record of 2020", stating that its egalitarian themes resonated with "the strife faced by the current generation".

Christoph Lampert of Ox-Fanzine compared Svalbard's "idiosyncratic mix of post-hardcore with shoegaze and metal elements" on the album with Oathbreaker, but said that "this comparison is inevitably doomed to failure, because Svalbard simply have the more intensive songs at the start." Lampert additionally described every song on the album "a masterpiece." Luke Morton of Kerrang! compared its shoegaze textures and "crystalline instrumentation" favourably with the Rolo Tomassi album Time Will Die And Love Will Bury It (2018). Rock Hard's Felix Mescoli said that Svalbard's "greatest achievement" on the album was their dynamic and polished song structures. Conversely, Martin Toussaint of DIY criticized the "overly cohesive" nature of its songs such as "The Currency of Beauty" and "Pearlescent".

=== Accolades ===
When I Die, Will I Get Better? on year-end lists
Publication	List	Rank	Ref.
BrooklynVegan	Top 55 Albums of 2020	44	
Decibel	Top 40 Albums of 2020	35	
Kerrang!	The 50 greatest albums of 2020	8	
Metal Hammer	The 50 best metal albums of 2020	5	
The Quietus	The Best Heavy Metal of 2020	16	

== Track listing ==
All lyrics are written by Serena Cherry; all music is composed by Svalbard.

Standard release
No.	Title	Length
1.	"Open Wound"	5:36
2.	"Click Bait"	5:46
3.	"Throw Your Heart Away"	4:04
4.	"Listen to Someone"	5:10
5.	"Silent Restraint"	4:08
6.	"What Was She Wearing?"	4:43
7.	"The Currency of Beauty"	5:47
8.	"Pearlescent"	3:27
Total length:		38:41

Japanese limited edition
No.	Title	Length
9.	"Listen to Someone" (instrumental)	5:10
10.	"Pearlescent" (instrumental)	3:27
Total length:		47:18

== Personnel ==
Adapted from liner notes.

Svalbard
- Serena Cherry – vocals, guitars
- Liam Phelan – vocals, guitars, rhodes piano
- Alex Heffernan – bass
- Mark Lilley – drums

Additional personnel

- Tim Birkbeck – additional vocals (2)
Production
- Lewis Johns – producer, engineering, mastering

Artwork

- Steven Kingscote – illustration
- Alex Heffernan – design and layout
