= It's Hard to Have Hope =

Studio album by Svalbard
- Released: 25 May 2018
- Recorded: September 2017
- Studio: The Ranch Production House (Southampton)
- Genres: Post-hardcore; post-metal
- Length: 37:37
- Label: Holy Roar
- Producer: Lewis Johns

Svalbard chronology
One Day All This Will End (2015)	It's Hard to Have Hope (2018)	When I Die, Will I Get Better? (2020)

Singles from It's Hard to Have Hope
- 1. "Unpaid Intern" Released: 28 February 2018; 2. "Revenge Porn" Released: 9 April 2018; 3. "For the Sake of the Breed" Released: 2 May 2018

It's Hard to Have Hope is the second studio album by British post-hardcore band Svalbard, released on 25 May 2018 by Holy Roar Records. The album was recorded in September 2017 at The Ranch Production House in Southampton with producer Lewis Johns. Primarily displaying a post-hardcore and post-metal sound, it expands on the heaviness and melodic tendencies of their debut album One Day All This Will End (2015). Its lyrics address various social and political topics including unpaid internships, revenge porn, feminism, abortion, animal welfare, sexual assault and long-term illness. It was Svalbard's only album with bassist Adam Parrish.

It's Hard to Have Hope received generally positive reviews from critics, who praised its messages and musical growth. The album was listed as one of 2018's best albums by Decibel, Kerrang! and Vice. Throughout 2018 and 2019, Svalbard supported its release with tours of the United Kingdom and Europe, as well as their first-ever tour of Japan.

== Background and recording ==
Following the release of their debut album One Day All This Will End (2015), Svalbard went through a period of internal turmoil, marked by the departure of their bassist and the end of Serena Cherry and Liam Phelan's romantic relationship of seven years; both members would also go through their own long-term health struggles. As a result of this turmoil, Svalbard approached the writing of It's Hard to Have Hope as if it was going to be their final album, giving them the chance to be "creatively fearless" with their compositions and lyrics. The band worked together on its music first, with Cherry writing its lyrics later on. They would regroup in September 2017 to record the album at The Ranch Production House in Southampton with producer Lewis Johns. It was mastered by Brad Boatright at Audiosiege Mastering in January 2018.

== Composition and lyrics ==
=== Overview ===
It's Hard to Have Hope has been described as post-hardcore and post-metal. It has also been described as featuring elements of black metal, shoegaze, post-rock and melodic hardcore. According to Kerrang!, the album's songs are established on a foundation composed of "surging riffs and a sense of constant forward momentum that's as infused with the spirit of punk rock as it is the thunderous power of metal". Expanding on the heavy and melodic tendencies of One Day All This Will End, they feature fast drumbeats, melodic, tremolo-heavy guitar lines and a balance of clean singing and screamed vocals.

The album's lyrics cover a variety of social and political topics. Cherry wrote the lyrics in a direct and confrontational manner, lacking any metaphoric and poetic ambiguity, "so a six-year-old could read the words and know exactly what I'm talking about and where I stand on [the] issues [addressed]". Cherry credited her experience writing for Terrorizer around the time of album's writing for inspiring its direct tone, to draw a contrast against to the "obscured" and "vague" lyrics of the bands she interviewed for the magazine. She also credited journalist Caitlin Moran for "[inspiring] me to be much more open and direct about being a feminist [...] Through reading her work, I felt encouraged not to hold back my thoughts and feelings, and to put them into songs."

In a 2018 interview with Blocland, Cherry described her approach of writing the album's lyrics:

Whatever pissed me off that day, I wrote about it [...] Once I adopted this approach of just essentially focusing on one target per song then venting all my rage towards it, the lyrics came so quickly and naturally this time. I find I can't really switch off my socio-political side, so it felt like the lyrical content was just bubbling away inside me, waiting to be released! It was an extremely cathartic process, as I didn't really sit there refining my words or trying to write something that sounds mysterious.

=== Songs ===
"Unpaid Intern" rallies against the "backwards, classist agenda of unpaid internships" and the exclusion of the working class from higher-skilled jobs, "not because you don't have the appropriate skills, but because you are poor". In an interview with Astral Noize, Cherry said that whilst none of Svalbard's members had been unpaid interns themselves, she had been forced to turn down several companies offering them in the past. "Revenge Porn" addresses the culture of blaming the victims of revenge porn and the shortcomings of UK laws in holding perpetrators accountable. "Feminazi?!" is a response to those who use the pejorative term feminazi to vilify feminism. It was inspired by a YouTube comment left on the video for Svalbard's song "Expect Equal Respect". "Pro-Life?" covers the pro-life movement against abortion, which Cherry saw as "something that criminalises doctors, and to me, it doesn't even seem to be about saving lives – it seems to be about patriarchy and oppressing women."

"For the Sake of the Breed" criticizes the breeding of brachycephalic dogs for fashion, whilst other mongrels are abandoned in homeless shelters. "How Do We Stop It?" is an autobiographical account of Cherry's experience of being sexually assaulted at the Wacken Open Air festival when she was 18 years old. Having not talked about the experience publicly, she was inspired to after reading an article about Architects frontman Sam Carter, who stopped the band's performance at Lowlands in August 2017 to call out sexual harassment. Cherry said that Svalbard would never perform the song live "because it still makes me feel so vulnerable". "Try Not to Die Until You're Dead", the only "personal song" on the album, is about Cherry's health struggles after contracting a parasitic bug that left her stomach organs permanently damaged, and "suddenly having to fight very hard to keep on living, and feeling pathetically grateful for any morsel of support you receive when your life takes a turn for the worse". The song's title is a reference to the Japanese manga series Hunter × Hunter. Similar to "Lily" on One Day All This Will End, the instrumental track "Iorek" ends It's Hard to Have Hope with "straight-up, shimmering shoegaze", according to Kerrang!. Cherry said that the song is "a final reminder that hope is always worth the fight in the end."

== Title and artwork ==
It's Hard to Have Hope was named after a lyric in "Try Not to Die Until You're Dead". Cherry said that the lyric refers to her health struggles in the original context of the song, but that she and the other members of Svalbard also felt that it "surmised both the personal and the political outlook of the band". The title was chosen after the band rejected one proposed by Cherry that was deemed to be too obvious in its feminist messaging.

The album's cover artwork was drawn by Steve Kingscote, whom Svalbard discovered after he drew its members as dogs whilst they were working at their practice space. It was stylistically inspired by Kentaro Miura's manga series Berserk, which Cherry was reading around the time of the album's writing, specifically his "dark and expressive" drawings of trees: "I wanted something similar for our artwork, to represent that same feeling of darkness and despair closing in." She noted, however, that the circle in the center of the cover "represents the unyielding hope at the center of everything."

== Release and promotion ==
It's Hard to Have Hope was originally released through Holy Roar Records on 25 May 2018. The album was released in the United States through Translation Loss Records, an independent label run by an employee of Relapse Records (with whom Svalbard were originally in talks with about releasing the album in the US). It also became Svalbard's first album to be released in Japan, through Tokyo Jupiter Records. Cherry considered the band's signing with the label "a complete stroke of luck", as they had been considering touring Japan when the label contacted them. In June 2022, Nuclear Blast Records acquired the worldwide rights to the album after Svalbard signed to the label.

Svalbard supported Holy Roar labelmates OHHMS at a few shows in the United Kingdom in May 2018. A more extensive tour of the United Kingdom and Europe would follow, including a performance at the 2018 ArcTanGent Festival. They also supported La Dispute on some of their tour dates in August 2018. In early 2019, bassist Adam Parrish left Svalbard and was replaced by Alex Heffernan, formerly of Pariso (who Svalbard recorded a split album with back in 2014). Although Heffernan had previously declined an offer to join the band a few years prior, he would express interest in doing so shortly before Parrish's departure. Afterwards, Svalbard performed at the 2019 Roadburn Festival as part of a Holy Roar Records showcase, before embarking on their first-ever tour of Japan in May 2019 with The Tidal Sleep. Between 26 October and 1 November 2019, the band toured Europe again, this time supporting Victims.

== Critical reception ==
Professional ratings
Review scores
Source	Rating
Dead Press!	8/10
Decibel	7/10
Distorted Sound	10/10
Kerrang!	4/5 stars
Metal Hammer	4/5 stars
Terrorizer	8.5/10

It's Hard to Have Hope received generally positive reviews from critics. Louise Brown of The Quietus called it a "powerful, poignant and critical" album for metal fans in 2018 that "should not be ignored". Invisible Oranges head editor Ian Cory praised its "stirring [musical] conviction" and bluntness of its message, concluding: "you couldn't ask for a better record to have in your corner when stepping into the ring with the world's bullshit." Britt Meißner of Ox-Fanzine similarly found that Svalbard's "passion and tears" was what made the album "special".

Selecting it as their "Album of the Week", Olly Thomas of Kerrang! described the album as "the sound of a band fulfilling their potential, while maturing in unexpected ways" whilst remaining "utterly triumphant in the way its sonics snag your heart as its message engages your brain". Likewise, Metal Hammer's Luke Morton said that Svalbard "have become masters of the build, allowing the music to expand and blossom into something more". In a mixed-to-positive review from Decibel, Shane Mehling praised Svalbard's ability to mix melodic hardcore and post-rock together but noted that the album's songs "[seemed] constructed to fill both genre columns whether it's necessary or not", making the album "diluted and somewhat predictable" at points with its use of formula.

=== Accolades ===
It's Hard to Have Hope on year-end lists
Publication	List	Rank	Ref.
Decibel	Top 40 Albums of 2018	29	
Kerrang!	The 50 Albums That Shook 2018	15	
The Quietus	The 20 Best Metal Albums of 2018	10	
Vice	The 100 Best Albums of 2018	40	

== Track listing ==
All lyrics are written by Serena Cherry; all music is composed by Svalbard.

Standard release
No.	Title	Length
1.	"Unpaid Intern"	4:02
2.	"Revenge Porn"	6:15
3.	"Feminazi?!"	4:19
4.	"Pro-Life?"	4:44
5.	"For the Sake of the Breed"	4:18
6.	"How Do We Stop It?"	5:38
7.	"Try Not to Die Until You're Dead"	6:02
8.	"Iorek"	2:16
Total length:		37:37

Japanese limited edition
No.	Title	Length
9.	"Open the Cages"	3:57
Total length:		41:34

== Personnel ==
Personnel per liner notes.

Svalbard
- Serena Cherry – lead guitar, vocals
- Liam Phelan – rhythm guitar, vocals
- Adam Parrish – bass
- Mark Lilley – drums
Production
- Lewis Johns – production, mixing, engineering
- Dom Wright – additional engineering
- Brad Boatright – mastering

Artwork

- Steven Kingscote – artwork
- Liam Phelan – layout
- Alex Heffernan – layout
