= Slow Crush =

Belgian shoegaze band

- Origin: Leuven, Belgium
- Genres: Shoegaze; noise pop
- Years active: 2017–present
- Labels: Flood; White Russian; Dingleberry; Holy Roar; Church Road; Quiet Panic; Pure Noise
- Members: Isa Holliday; Jelle Ronsmans; Frederik Meeuwis; Nic Placklé
- Past members: Steven Cammaerts; Jan Jouck; Jeroen Jullet
- Website: slowcrush.org

Slow Crush are a Belgian shoegaze band from Leuven.

== History ==
Slow Crush was formed in 2017 in Leuven, Belgium, by vocalist/bassist Isa Holliday, guitarists Jelle Ronsmans and Jan Jouck, and drummer Steve Cammaerts. The band's debut EP, Ease, was released on 18 May 2017.

In March 2018, Slow Crush signed with Holy Roar Records. The band's debut album, Aurora, was released on 23 September 2018. In 2019, Jouck and Cammaerts both left the band due to personal commitments and health issues, respectively. Jeroen Jullet and Frederik Meeuwis replaced both members. In October 2019, Holy Roar released a deluxe edition of Ease.

In March 2020, Slow Crush released a 7" single featuring the songs "Reel" and "Pale Skin". In September 2020, Slow Crush severed ties with Holy Roar after the label's founder was accused of rape and sexual misconduct. In January 2021, the band signed with Church Road Records, who released their second album, Hush, on 22 October 2021.

In September 2024, the band signed with Pure Noise Records. The band released their third studio album, Thirst, on 29 August 2025.

In fall 2025, the band toured in the United States with slowcore band Flooding. Along with Bay Area band Pure Hex and "fairy-doom" metal band Faetooth.

== Discography ==
Studio albums

List of studio albums, with selected details
Title	Album details
Aurora	Released: September 28, 2018; Label: Holy Roar, Quiet Panic; Format: CD, LP, DD
Hush	Released: 22 October 2021; Label: Church Road, Quiet Panic; Format: CD, LP, DD
Thirst	Released: 29 August 2025; Label: Pure Noise; Format: CD, LP, DD

EPs

List of EPs, with selected details
Title	EP details
Ease	Released: 18 May 2017; Format: CD, DD
Ease (Deluxe Edition)	Released: 25 October 2019; Format: CD, LP, DD

== Band members ==
Current members

- Isa Holliday – vocals, bass (2017–present)
- Jelle Ronsmans – guitar (2017–present)
- Nic Placklé – guitar (2022–present)
- Frederik Meeuwis – drums (2019–present)

Former members

- Jan Jouck – guitar (2017–2019)
- Steven Cammaerts – drums (2017–2019)
- Jeroen Jullet – guitar (2020–2022)
- George Lennon - guitar (2019-2020)
