= Wallowing (band) =

British sci-fi metal band

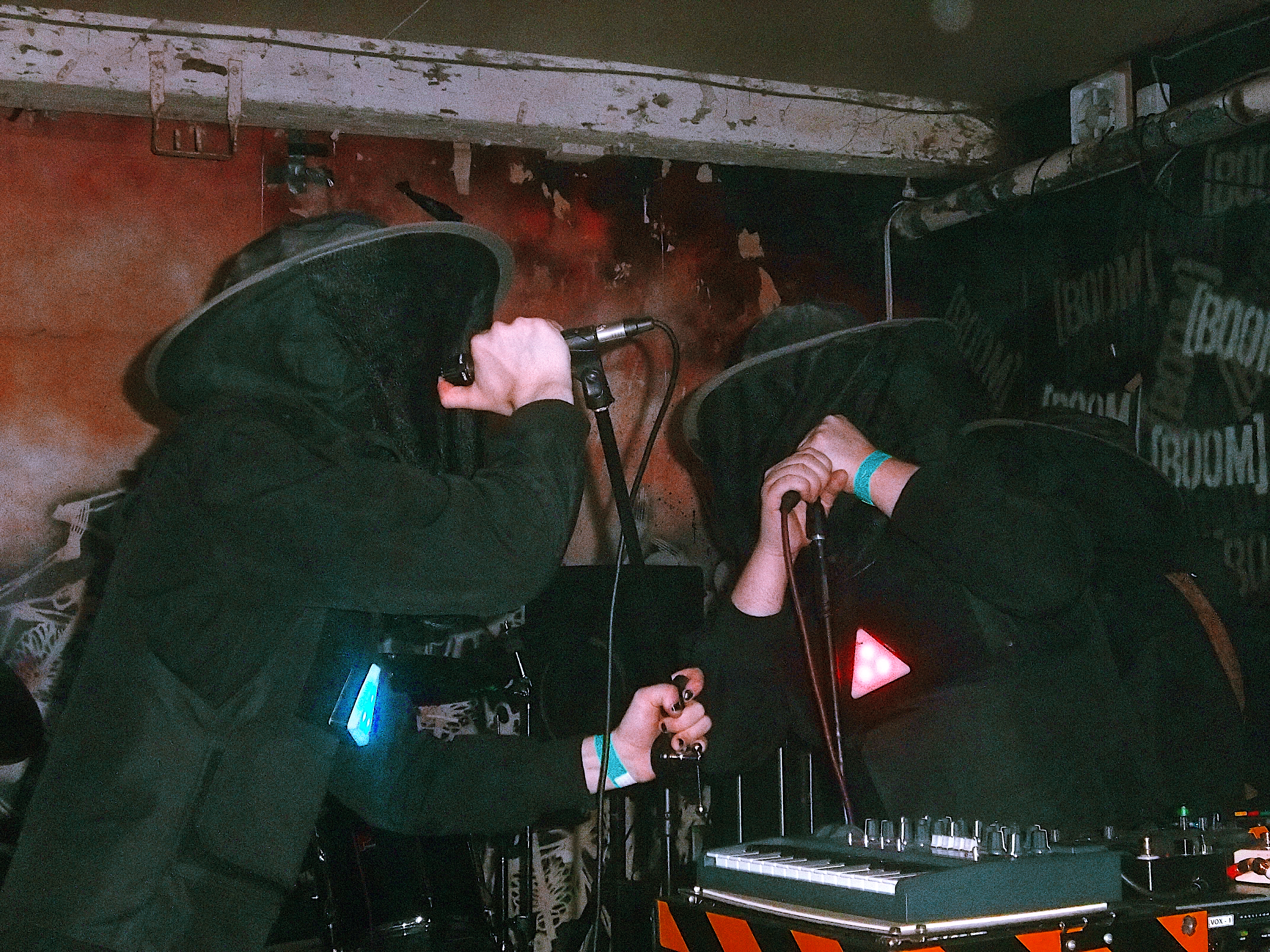
- Wallowing performing live in 2022

Background information
- Origin: Brighton, England
- Genre: Sludge metal
- Years active: 2015–present
- Labels: Church Road; Sludgelord Records; Black Voodoo Records; Surviving Sounds; Trepanation Records; Gutless Productions
- Members: Tom Harrison; Rauiri Boyden; Maxim Taite-Ellis; Mark Roberts; Jon Wingrove
- Past members: Zak Duffield
- Website: www.planetloss.com

Wallowing are a metal band from Brighton, UK. The band formed in 2015, with their debut show being at the Cardiff Psych & Noise Festival 2018. They released their first album Planet Loss through Sludgelord Records and Black Voodoo Records in September 2019.

== History ==
=== 2015–2019: Formation and Planet Loss ===
Wallowing was formed in Brighton in 2015 by Tom Harrison, Rauiri Boyden, Zak Duffield, Mark Roberts and Jon Wingrove. All members had played in other bands prior to its formation; Tom Harrison said that from the start the band was "intended to have an obscure and out-there sound". It was originally intended to be a one-man studio project by Tom, but ended up becoming a full band, with Tom Harrison saying "the more I worked at the music the more it dawned on me that if I wanted this sound as big as possible I would have to have more people involved to really do it justice".

The band's first album, Planet Loss was recorded by Wayne Adams at Bear Bites Horse studio in London and was released through Sludgelord Records and Black Voodoo Records in 2019. A lot of the foundation and the concept of Planet Loss was already completed by Tom Harrison before other members joined, with some ideas for the project starting in 2015, and the rest of the band joining later.

A graphic novella depicting the story of the album was created by artist Luke Oram, and was sold individually as well as alongside the record. A short run of action figures based on the album and graphic novel was also produced. Vice described Planet Loss as a "punishing slab of distortion and despair".

Planet Loss was re-released on CD by Surviving Sounds and Trepanation Records, and on tape in Asia via Gutless Productions.

The band began performing in costume in 2018, and although originally this was intended to be a one off, it became a permanent fixture of their performances.

=== 2020-2022: Four Way Split ===
Wallowing released a live single IV: Hail Creation (Live at S.O.A.N) with proceeds donated to the NHS during the COVID-19 pandemic.

The band wrote and recorded two tracks for a split LP with 3 other bands: Slabdragger, Vixen Maw and Thin. It was released in 2021 by Sludgelord Records and Black Voodoo Records. Due to the COVID-19 pandemic, the band took a DIY recording approach and recorded these tracks without playing them together as a band.

In 2022, vocalist Zak Duffield left the band and was replaced by Maxim Taite-Ellis.

=== 2023-2024: Earth Reaper, Church Road Records, Waterstones ===
Wallowing released their second album, Earth Reaper in April 2023, through Church Road Records. Earth Reaper was recorded at No Studio by Joe Clayton. Kerrang gave the album 4 out of 5, and described Wallowing as "a difficult band to get your head around". Lambgoat described the album as "cataclysmic, every bit as ruinous as you would expect from the name". Metal Hammer described it as a "space opera soundtrack scored by fans of prog, grind and doom metal".

Wallowing's stage outfits have evolved to be more complete with hoods and body packs, saying in reference to this "We're constantly striving to be bigger, better and more ridiculous". Starting in 2023, Wallowing began doing interviews using only their initials to identify themselves.

In 2023, Wallowing became the first metal band to play a show in a Waterstones bookshop, saying "It would be silly to turn down such a ridiculous offer."

Wallowing performed at ArcTanGent Festival 2023, and toured in support of Earth Reaper, including supporting bands such as Frozen Soul and Conan.

In May 2024, Wallowing released the single Restless Dusk I: The Anamnesis Hymn, which is a continuation of the comic book series of the same name by Luke Oram. A remastered re-release of Planet Loss was released in August 2024, which features this single as a bonus track.

== Band members ==
- Tom Harrison (2015–present)
- Rauiri Boyden (2015–present)
- Maxim Taite-Ellis (2022–present)
- Mark Roberts (2015–present)
- Jon Wingrove (2015–present)

Past members

- Zak Duffield (2015–2022)

== Discography ==
Studio albums

Title	Details
Planet Loss	Released: 13 September 2019; Label: Sludgelord Records, Black Voodoo, Trepanation Records, Surviving Sounds, Gutless Productions; Format: CD, LP, DD, Cassette
Earth Reaper	Released: 28 April 2023; Label: Church Road Records; Format: CD, LP, DD, Cassette
Planet Loss (remastered)	Released: 24 August 2024; Label: Church Road Records; Format: CD, LP, DD, Cassette

EPs

Title	Details
Four Way Split	Released: 24 July 2020; Label: Sludgelord Records; Format: LP, DD; Featuring Slabdragger, Vixen Maw, Thin

Singles

Title	Details
IV: Hail Creation (Live at S.O.A.N)	Released: 10 April 2020; Format: DD; Label: Sludgelord Records
Flesh And Steel	Released: 3 Feb 2023; Label: Church Road Records; Format: DD
Cries Of Estima	Released: 31 March 2023; Label: Church Road Records; Format: DD
Restless Dusk I: The Anamnesis Hymn	Released: 1 May 2024; Format: DD
