= Object 1 =

EP by Flooding
- Released: July 11, 2025
- Genre: Slowcore
- Length: 17:08
- Label: self-released

Flooding chronology
Silhouette Machine (2023)	Object 1 (2025)

Singles from Object 1
- 1. "your silence is my favorite song" Released: 6 May 2025; 2. "depictions of the female body" Released: 20 June 2025

Object 1 (stylized as object 1) is an EP by the American slowcore band Flooding. It was released on July 11, 2025.

== Background and recording ==
Speaking of why the release was an EP Rose Brown said "it felt right to make it a more condensed work. It felt so different from what we'd been doing that I kind of wanted it to be an endcap or a starting-off point for future things." It was created to be a less personal release lyrically compared to the previous record. With the song "Your Silence Is My Favorite Song" in particular being somewhat sarcastic. Brown said of it "It's fun to pretend to be a piece of shit male rock idol for 4 minutes."

== Critical reception ==
In a 7.8/10 review, The Daily Music Report said the release "shows a band sharpening its focus without losing its edge." Flood Magazine added they are "blending genres with the same crafty complexity heard in their lyrics." Crucial Rhythm claimed that the EP let a "new kind of clarity through—both melodically and thematically" compared to the harsher Silhouette Machine. S.L.R. Magazine said the band infused a "pop-forward songwriting into their sound" for this release.

Professional ratings
Review scores
Source	Rating
The Daily Music Report	7.8/10

== Track listing ==
All tracks are written by Rose Brown except "object 1" written by Flooding.

No.	Title	Length
1.	"Complete Detail"	4:53
2.	"Your Silence Is My Favorite Song"	4:29
3.	"Depictions of the Female Body"	4:25
4.	"Object 1"	3:19
Total length:		17:08

== Personnel ==
- Rose Brown – Vocals and Guitar
- Zach Cunningham – Drums
- Cole Billings – Bass
