= Noctule (band) =

British black metal project

Background information
- Origin: Bristol, England
- Genre: Black metal
- Years active: 2020–present
- Label: Church Road
- Spinoff of: Svalbard
- Members: Serena Cherry
- Website: noctule.bandcamp.com

Noctule is a British musical project founded by Serena Cherry, best known as the lead guitarist and co-lead vocalist of Svalbard, in 2020. Launched as a personal creative outlet amidst the COVID-19 pandemic lockdowns, Cherry considered the project to be a return to her roots as a black metal solo artist, prior to forming Svalbard in 2011, with its video game-inspired lyrics contrasting with the aforementioned band's heavy subject matters.

The project's debut album, Wretched Abyss (2021), is musically and lyrically themed around the 2011 video game The Elder Scrolls V: Skyrim, whilst its second album, Extinguish Thy Flame (2026), is themed around the 2022 video game Elden Ring.

== History ==
=== Early history and Wretched Abyss (2020–2022) ===
When she was 16 years old, Serena Cherry purchased a four-track recorder, a Jackson guitar and a Boss DR-110 Dr. Rhythm drum machine and began writing black metal songs, releasing three EPs under a moniker. A few years later, she hired a live band which opened for Gallhammer and Nachtmystium, though it eventually fell apart and she returned to working on music on her own. Cherry later formed the post-hardcore band Svalbard with Liam Phelan and Mark Lilley in 2011. Cherry said that her black metal element "never stopped but it simmered down" whilst in the band, and that she "always found I had way more [blackended] ideas than I could cram into a Svalbard album"; some of the riffs that would be used with Noctule were originally written for Svalbard but deemed unfit for the band's sound.

I have always associated Skyrim with black metal. The snowy mountain settings, the morbid themes, the Norse mythology backbone – it just goes hand in hand for me.

— Serena Cherry

In 2020, after losing her job and the cancellation of Svalbard's tours for that year due to the COVID-19 pandemic and its associated lockdowns, Cherry began playing The Elder Scrolls V: Skyrim (2011) and returned to writing black metal music. She soon became inspired by the game and its accompanying soundtrack and decided to theme her music around them. "I wrote three songs instrumentally, just for fun", Cherry told NME in 2021, "Then I thought 'Oh, I might write one song about my favourite weapon…' And then, 'maybe I should write about my favourite dungeon' ... And it snowballed from there! It felt like such a natural pairing that it would have been mad not to just run with it." Cherry named her project "Noctule" after the bat of the same name, feeling that the name "[sounded] quite black metal".

Cherry wrote Noctule's debut album, Wretched Abyss, in under a year's time, and she produced and recorded it with co-producer Matt Francis, who mixed, mastered, and contributed some riffs to the album. Cherry played every instrument on the album, and taught herself how to program drums (instead of using drum loops) and use Logic Pro during its production. The album and its title track are named after Hermaeus Mora, one of Skyrim's Daedric Princes, and its lyrics further reference certain dungeons, storylines and items in the game. Cherry said that she wanted to distance herself from the heavy and often personal subject matters she wrote about in Svalbard's songs, and as such made "a really deliberate choice to go, 'I'm not going to talk about anything to do with me on this record.' The only emotion on the album is how much I love the dungeons in Skyrim."

Cherry had not planned on releasing Noctule's music publicly, but was prompted to by Sammy Urwin of Church Road Records. Wretched Abyss was released on 28 May 2021 to generally positive reviews from critics, who praised its songwriting and melodic qualities. Metal Hammer listed the album as one of the top 10 black metal albums of 2021. The positive reception to the album online led to Noctule receiving offers to play gigs, prompting Cherry to recruit a live band for the project, featuring Francis on guitar and Rhys Griffiths, formerly of Extreme Noise Terror, on drums. Noctule played its first show on 7 May 2022 in Camden, England, on the Underworld Stage of the 2022 Incineration Fest. In August 2022, the band played at Church Road Records' 5th Birthday Bash at the Black Heart in London. Noctule was put "on hold" following these performances as Cherry returned to her normal job and touring, leaving her with no time to write black metal, and because she found Noctule's performances too expensive and time-consuming for her to make into a regular occurrence.

=== Extinguish Thy Flame (2023–present) ===
Cherry had already begun planning Noctule's second album prior to the release of Wretched Abyss. She initially indicated that it would be a "choral black metal" album themed to Sovngarde, Skyrim's in-game afterlife. In a 2023 interview with Decibel, Cherry said that "exploring my passion for games by writing songs about them is definitely what Noctule is about now", and that the project's next album would now be about a different game. By February 2024, Cherry was working on the album; in a May 2025 Metal Hammer Q&A, she revealed that she had spent time working on it in the studio with Urwin.

Noctule's second album, Extinguish Thy Flame, was released on 25 September 2026. Written in between Svalbard's tours from 2023 to 2025, the album blends black metal with melodic death metal, and is themed around the 2022 video game Elden Ring. Cherry intended the album to be more ambitious than Wretched Abyss and showcase her capabilities as a musician. Each of the album's songs are inspired by Cherry's favourite bosses from Elden Ring, some of whose lore she found paralleled her personal life. The album received positive reviews from critics.

== Discography ==
Studio albums

Title	Details
Wretched Abyss	Released: 28 May 2021; Label: Church Road; Format: CD, LP, DD
Extinguish Thy Flame	Released: 25 September 2026; Label: Self-released; Format: LP, DD

Singles

Title	Year	Album
"Wretched Abyss"	2021	Wretched Abyss
"Labyrintian"	2021	Wretched Abyss
"Evenaar"	2021	Wretched Abyss
"Lord of Blood"	2026	Extinguish Thy Flame
"Goddess of Rot"	2026	Extinguish Thy Flame
