= Youves =

British dance-punk band

- Origin: Nuneaton, England
- Genres: Dance-punk, post-punk revival
- Years active: 2003–present
- Label: Holy Roar Records
- Members: Stephen Broadley; Michael King; Paul Wechter; Alex Wiezak; Luke Neale
- Past members: Jordan Daniel; Adam Mallabone; Jon McGovern; Craig Thornicroft
- Website: Youves - MySpace

Youves are an English dance-punk quintet from Nuneaton, formed in 2003. The band consists of lead vocalist Stephen Broadley, guitarists Michael King and Alex Wiezak, bassist Luke Neale and drummer Paul Wechter. The band's sound is an energetic mixture of punk, dance and new wave, which is characterized by an emphasis on percussion with polyrhythmic qualities and a quirky sometimes described as 'violent' but simplistic duel between guitars with a danceable edge.

In 2009, the band released their mini-album Cardio-Vascular which has been received with widespread acclaim from many notable publications.

== History ==
The band formed in 2003 as a hardcore punk band named 'The Tragic Vision' which consisted of Stephen Broadley, Michael King, Alex Wiezak, Jordan Daniel and Adam Mallabone. The band soon played many basement shows and house parties until less than a year later Jordan and Adam left the band. Soon after they recruited bassist Luke Neale and Drummer Jon McGovern. Developing their hardcore punk sound with many danceable qualities and soon becoming a fully fledged band they began gigging under name 'Mirror!Mirror!' in 2004. After a few months of relentless touring with bands such as Klaxons and Blood Red Shoes they released a split 7-inch record with Rolo Tomassi on Speedowax records.

The band then went on a break which lasted a year and during this time Jon McGovern had left the band which led to the recruitment of Craig Thornicroft to play drums. During this time they abandoned their hardcore punk sound and replaced it with a more dance-oriented sound which holds the intensity of hardcore punk which they possessed in previous projects. The band released the single "Wolfgang Bang", which remains in their setlist. Soon they signed a deal with Holy Roar Records to release a seven track mini-album but decided to not work under the name 'Mirror!Mirror!' and changed their name to 'Youves'. While writing new material and touring non-stop through the UK and Europe they released their mini-album Cardio-Vascular in the spring of 2009 to positive reviews from the NME and Rock Sound and the single and music video "Aladdins Rave" was released with moderate rotation which also led to the band enjoying a considerable amount of press.

The band are currently writing and recording their debut full-length album, working with former drummer Craig Thornicroft.

== Musical style ==
The band's Sound has been described by Rock Sound as "Unpretentious, Inventive and Infectious Dance-Punk Played with Style". The Fly described their sound as "Gang Of Four attacking The Rapture with a rusty breadknife-like guitar, awkward disco and lashings of cow bell". Artrocker also compared the band to The Rapture and Radio 4.

== Discography ==
=== As Mirror!Mirror! ===
- 4 track Cassette (Stop Scratching Records) - 2007
- split 7-inch w/ Rolo Tomassi (Speedo Wax Records) - 2008
- "Wolfgang Bang" / "Silicone Eyes" 7-inch Single (Tough Love Records) - 2008

=== As Youves ===
- Cardio-Vascular / Digital E.P (Holy Roar Records) - 2009

== Current members ==
- Stephen Broadley - Lead Vocals
- Alex Wiezak - Guitar and Backing Vocals
- Michael King - Guitar and Backing Vocals
- Luke Neale - Bass guitar
- Paul Wechter - Drums

== Former members ==
- Jon McGovern - Drums
- Craig Thornicroft -Drums
- Jordan Daniel - Bass
