= Underdark (band) =

British black metal band

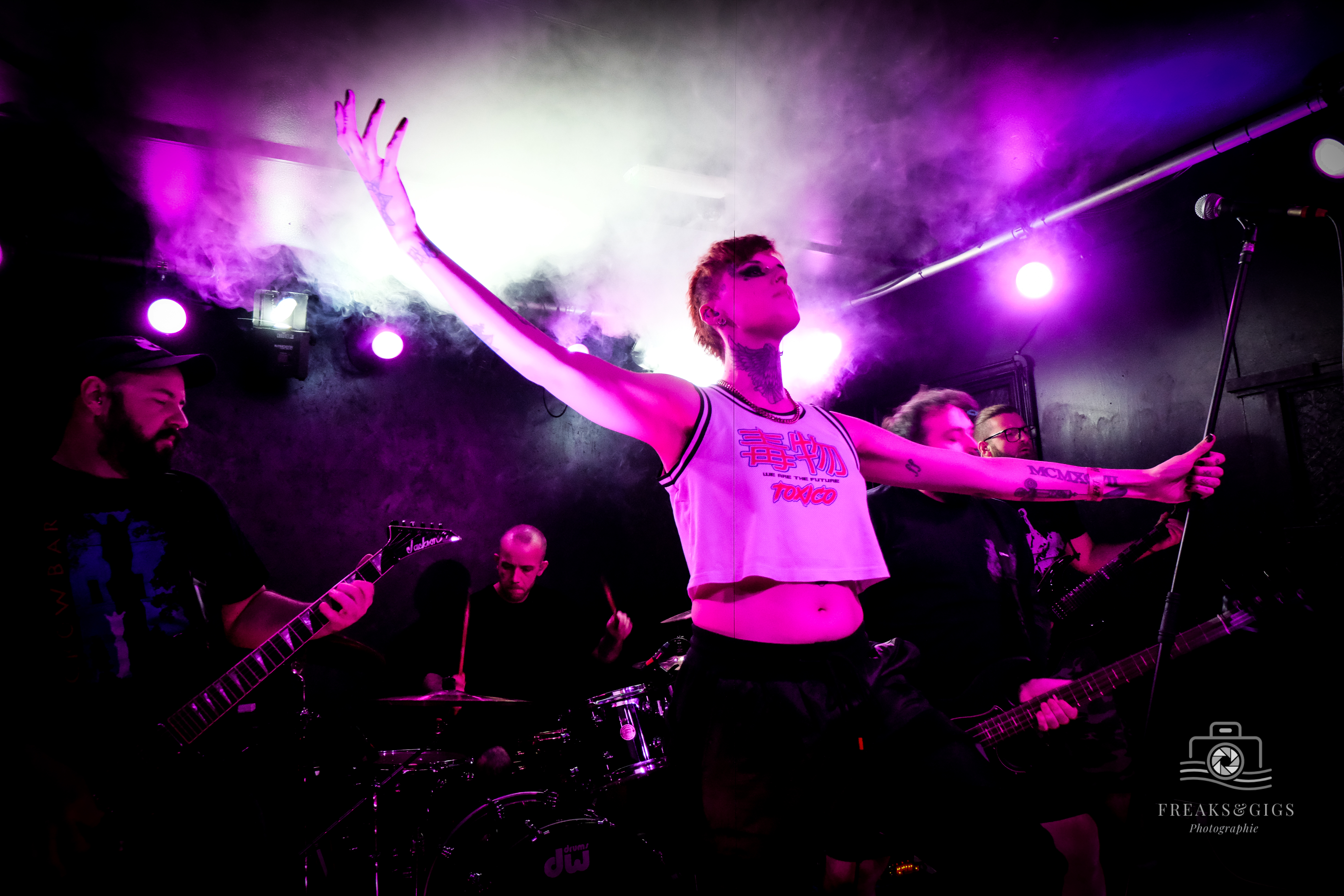
- Underdark in London in 2022

Background information
- Origin: Nottingham, England
- Genres: Black metal; post-metal; post-black metal
- Years active: 2015–present
- Labels: Adorno; Church Road; Red Nebula; Slime Citadel; Surviving Sounds; Third-I-Rex; Through Love; Tridroid
- Members: Abi Vasquez; Adam Kinson; Ollie Jones; Neil Sutherland; Dan Blackmore
- Past members: Max Speelman; Dan Hallam; Stephen Waterfield

Underdark are a British black metal band from Nottingham, England, formed in 2015 by guitarists Ollie Jones and Adam Kinson and former drummer Dan Hallam. Their current lineup consists of Jones, Kinson, bassist Neil Sutherland, vocalist Abi Vasquez and drummer Dan Blackmore. The band's sound has been categorized under the "post-black metal" label and incorporates elements of blackgaze, screamo, and post-hardcore. Its members' anti-fascist beliefs, held since the band's inception, have led to Underdark being associated with the "anti-fascist black metal" and Red and Anarchist Black Metal (RABM) movements, although they do not consider themselves to be a political band.

Underdark released their debut extended play, Mourning Cloak (2016), with original vocalist Max Speelman. Speelman quit the band and was replaced by Vasquez in 2019, shortly after the recording of its debut album, Our Bodies Burned Bright on Re-Entry (2021). In 2023, the band signed to Church Road Records and released its second album Managed Decline. Their third album, O Come Forth Annihilation, was released on 6 November 2026.

== History ==
=== 2015–2018: Formation and early releases ===
Underdark were formed in 2015 when guitarists Ollie Jones and Adam Kinson (of Statutes) approached drummer Dan Hallam (of Castaway) about the possibility of starting a black metal band "similar to Deafheaven with scream influences such as Envy". The members all came from "hardcore or hardcore-adjacent" musical backgrounds; Hallam had little-to-no experience with black metal prior to joining the band. They then recruited vocalist Max Speelman, whom they had seen perform live once, before recruiting bassist Stephen Waterfield. The band takes its name from the Funeral Diner album The Underdark (2005).

Hallam said that Underdark's music started off as "purely Deafheaven and Envy worship", and that they gradually began incorporating post-rock and post-metal-influenced textures into their songwriting to make it "grander". In 2016, the band self-released their debut extended play (EP), Mourning Cloak, which was later distributed through the DIY record labels Adorno, Slime Citadel, Third-I-Rex and Sell Your Soul. Underdark toured heavily throughout 2017, playing shows with Dawn Ray’d, Hundred Year Old Man, The Infernal Sea and Crimson Throne and touring with Nihility and Coltsblood. In early 2018, they released a split 7-inch single with Antre, which entered the top-selling black metal chart on Bandcamp. Underdark embarked on their first European tour in July 2018, before playing on the "New Blood" stage of the Bloodstock Open Air festival in August.

=== 2019–2022: Our Bodies Burned Bright on Re-Entry ===
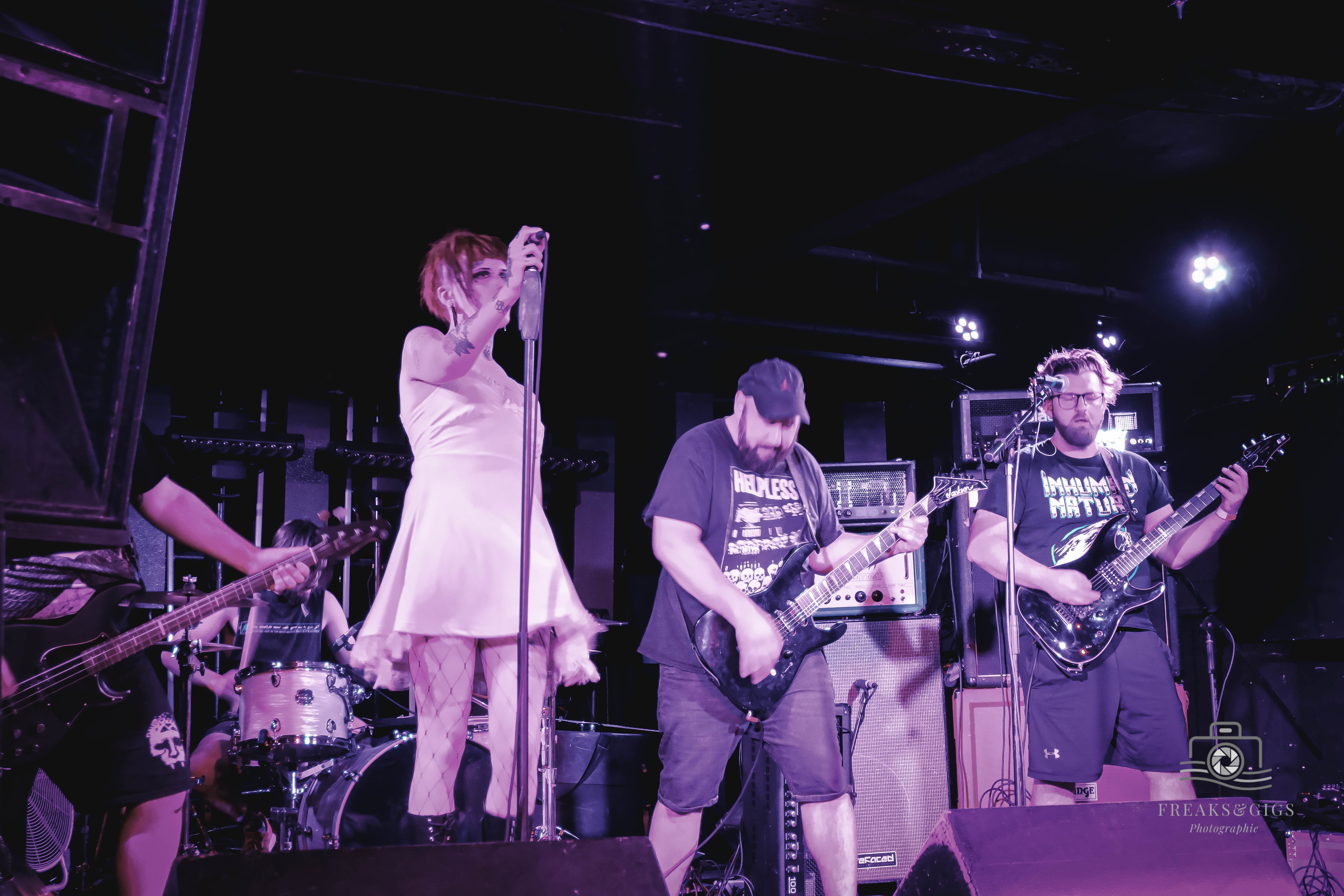
Underdark performing in 2022

Underdark began writing their debut album, Our Bodies Burned Bright on Re-Entry, in 2018. It was initially planned as an extended play but was expanded into an album over the course of a year. Shortly after the band recorded the album in January 2019, Speelman quit Underdark due to "conflicting ideals", according to Hallam. The band were "gutted" by his exit and briefly considered breaking up, but decided against it and began searching for a new vocalist. In June 2019, they recruited Abi Vasquez, formerly of Yuri. Vasquez first met most of Underdark's members whilst she was working as a booking agent in Leicester; Hallam had also played shows with Yuri when he was in an emo band. Underdark announced the addition of Vasquez to their line-up in September 2019, hours before her first performance with the band. Vasquez recorded new vocal tracks with her own lyrics for Our Bodies Burned Bright on Re-Entry over its already completed instrumental tracks, after which it was remixed and remastered.

Although Underdark had finished Our Bodies Burned Bright on Re-Entry by March 2020, they were forced to delay its release due to the COVID-19 pandemic. On 30 October 2020, the band released a limited edition cassette single, featuring a cover version of the Cure's "Plainsong" and a re-recording of Mourning Cloak track "With Bruised and Bloodied Feet", as a way of introducing Vasquez and the direction of their forthcoming debut album to the public. It was released through Surviving Sounds in Europe and Red Nebula in North America, and limited to 50 copies per label. Our Bodies Burned Bright on Re-Entry was finally released on 30 July 2021, and was distributed by three record labels; Surviving Sounds in the United Kingdom, Through Love in Europe and Tridroid in North America. The album received positive reviews from critics. Underdark embarked on a small tour of the United Kingdom following its release, and played one-off shows opening for Dawn Ray'd and Conan. In March 2022, Underdark and Mountain Caller supported Svalbard on select dates of their UK tour for that month. The band were due to perform at Cult of Luna's Beyond the Redshift Festival in London that same month, but it was postponed.

=== 2023–present: Managed Decline and O Come Forth Annihilation ===
Underdark began working on new material at the end of the COVID-19 pandemic, and had finished writing half of their second album, Managed Decline by July 2021. Towards the end of writing, Hallam left Underdark and was replaced by Dan Blackmore. In the winter of 2022, the band recorded the album with producer Joe Clayton at Nø Studio in Manchester. Managed Decline is a concept album, detailing the long-term effects of Thatcherite neo-liberalism on a post-industrial town in the Midlands across three generations. Jones said that the events detailed in its lyrics were based on "an amalgamation of accounts" from people Vasquez interviewed about their experiences in post-industrial towns.

On 5 July 2023, Underdark announced they had signed to Church Road Records and released a cover version of Massive Attack's "Unfinished Sympathy". Managed Decline was released on 24 November 2023, and received similar acclaim to their debut. Metal Hammer named it one of the best black metal albums of 2023. Around the time of its release, Underdark embarked on a short tour supporting Cruelty. The band performed at the ArcTanGent and Core. festivals in August 2024; their performance at ArcTanGent was their first with bassist Neil Sutherland. In November, they performed at the Damnation Festival. In December 2024, Our Bodies Burned Bright on Re-Entry was reissued through Church Road, which Underdark promoted with the release of a live music video for "Coyotes". On 6 November 2026, the band released their third album, O Come Forth Annihilation.

== Musical style and influences ==
Underdark have been described as black metal, post-metal, and "post-black metal". Their sound also incorporates elements of blackgaze, screamo, and post-hardcore. The band's musical influences include Alcest, City of Caterpillar, Dawn Ray'd, Deafheaven, Deftones, Envy, Mogwai, This Will Destroy You, Cradle of Filth and Weakling. According to Jones, the members of Underdark do not consider genre when writing music and instead try to "write what we want to hear". Although the band are influenced by black metal's aesthetics, Jones does not consider Underdark to be black metal "necessarily" due to its diverse range of influences.

Vasquez's lyrics are based in reality, "whether it's personal or something that affects people on a wider scale". She prefers to write songs as a longform narrative, and the lengthy nature of Underdark's songs allows her to discuss and research her topics in depth. Jones said that Vasquez's lyrics are heavily influenced by J.R. Hayes (Pig Destroyer) and Patrick Kindlon (Self Defense Family and Drug Church). The writing of Our Bodies Burned Bright On Re-Entry was more "fragmented" and personal than her previous output, addressing the attempted suicide of one of her close friends, her struggles with drug addiction, the Mexico–United States border, the Grenfell Tower fire and her fears of burnout. When writing lyrics for the album, she was listening to Dessa, Sadistik and 070 Shake. She cited Kendrick Lamar as an influence on her storytelling on Managed Decline.

== Political views ==
Since their inception, the members of Underdark have held anti-fascist beliefs and have been associated with the "anti-fascist black metal" movement against National Socialist Black Metal (NSBM), which emerged in the mid-2010s. They have also been associated with the Red and Anarchist Black Metal (RABM) movement. Despite this, Underdark do not consider themselves to be a political band. Vazquez has described herself as "more of a storyteller than an orator", though said that the band does not reject the RABM label. She believes that the best way of combatting NSBM is to play better music than NSBM bands. In a 2021 interview with Metalhead, Vasquez further stated:

[Y]ou can't live and die by your message alone, that's a good way of being a flash in the pan [...] If you're very right and progressive, that's all well and good—but if your riffs sound like shit, there's not going to be many people listening to your message.

== Band members ==
Current members

- Abi Vasquez - vocals (2019–present)
- Adam Kinson - guitar (2015–present)
- Ollie Jones - guitar (2015–present)
- Neil Sutherland - bass (2024–present)
- Dan Blackmore - drums (2022–present)

Past members

- Max Speelman - vocals (2015–2019)
- Dan Hallam - drums (2015–2022)
- Stephen Waterfield - bass (2015–2024)

Timeline

== Discography ==
=== Studio albums ===
List of studio albums, with selected details
Title	Album details
Our Bodies Burned Bright on Re-Entry	Released: 30 July 2021; Label: Surviving Sounds (UK), Through Love (EU), Tridroid (NA); Format: CD, LP, digital download
Managed Decline	Released: 24 November 2023; Label: Church Road; Format: CD, cassette, LP, digital download
O Come Forth Annihilation	Released: 6 November 2026; Label: Church Road; Format: CD, LP, digital download

=== Extended plays ===
List of EPs, with selected details
Title	EP details
Mourning Cloak	Released: 26 March 2016; Label: Adorno, Slime Citadel, Sell Your Soul, Third I Rex; Format: CD, cassette, LP, digital download
Plainsong / With Bruised & Bloodied Feet	Released: 30 October 2020; Label: Surviving Sounds/Red Nebula; Format: Cassette, digital download

=== Split releases ===
List of split releases, with selected details
Title	Split details
Underdark / Antre	Released: 12 February 2018; Label: Callous, FHED, Grandad; Format: 7-inch, digital download

=== Singles ===
List of singles
Title	Year	Album
"Coyotes"	2021	Our Bodies Burned Bright On Re-Entry
"With Ashen Hands Around Our Throats"	2021	Our Bodies Burned Bright On Re-Entry
"Unfinished Sympathy"	2023	Non-album single
"Enterprise (1st November 2004)"	2023	Managed Decline
"Matrimony (27th December 1997)"	2023	Managed Decline
"Non Linear Warfare"	2026	O Come Forth Annihilation
"Death of a Toolmaker"	2026	O Come Forth Annihilation
