= Flooding (band) =

American rock band

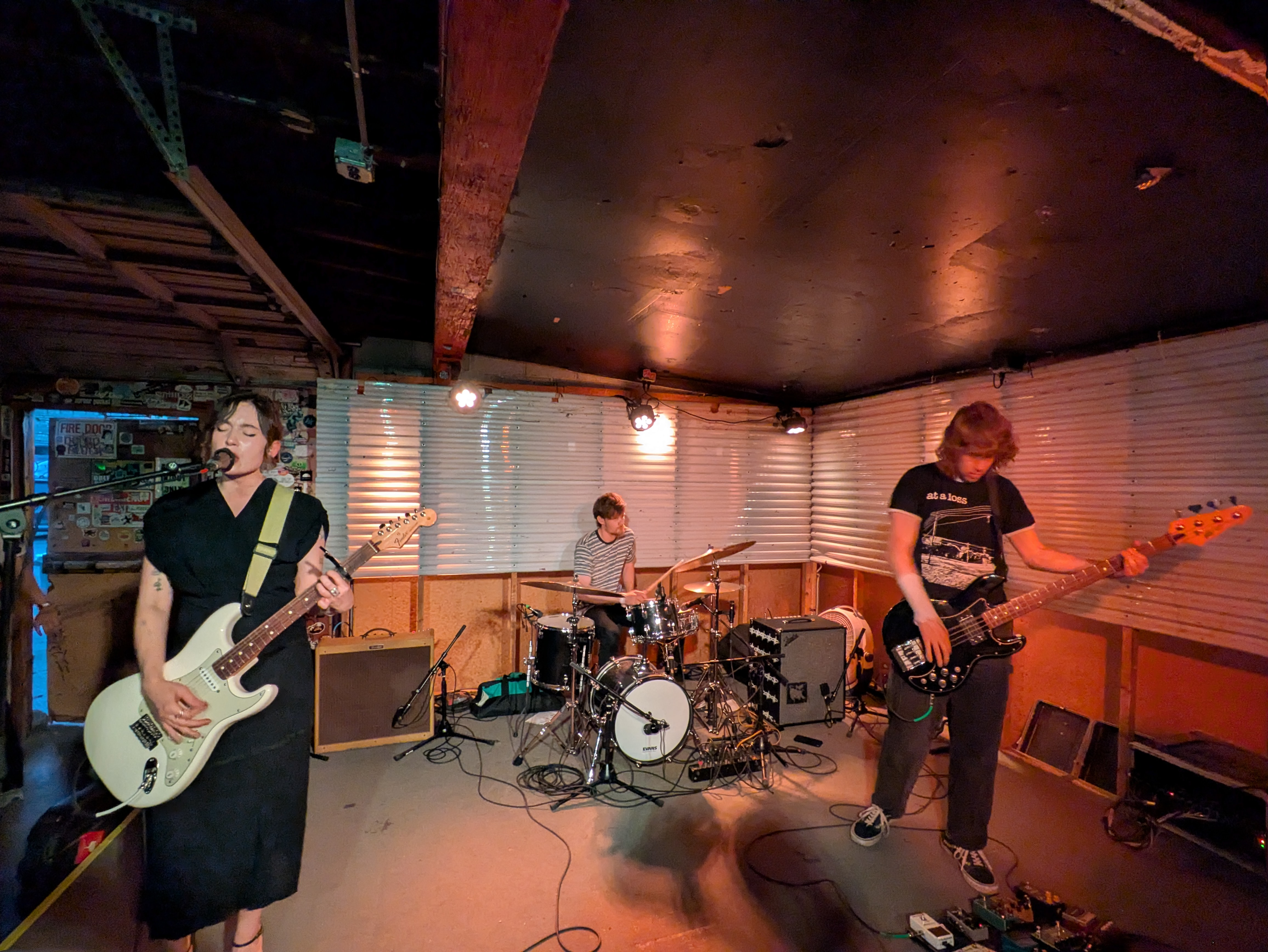
- Flooding Live in Salt Lake City 2026 at Kilby Court

Background information
- Origin: Lawrence, Kansas, U.S.
- Genres: Slowcore, shoegaze
- Years active: 2020–present
- Spinoffs: Guest Service, Granule
- Members: Rose Brown; Cole Billings; Zach Cunningham

Flooding is an American rock band from Lawrence, Kansas. They have released 2 full-length albums, and 2 EPs.

== History ==
Flooding began in Lawrence, Kansas in the early 2020s. Cole and Zach knew each other in high school and had jammed together. At university Rose asked Cole to start a band. Rose had been releasing solo music under the name Window Seat, but wanted to write "darker" songs for a 3-piece act. Rose had written the songs for their debut in spring 2020 then brought them to the band in early 2021 where they swiftly recorded, scrapped, re-recorded them. They released their self-titled debut album on August 29, 2021. Touring the album revamped the creativity within the songs and spawned some minor improvisation. On October 25, 2021, they announced they had signed to Kansas City record label Manor Records.

They have stated that the name Flooding came from a psychiatric phobia therapy of the same name where a patient is exposed to large amounts of their given fear in hopes of overcoming it.

They started playing new songs live having grown tired of the debut album and wanting to let their sound "develop".

In 2023 they contributed the song "This Will All Burn" to the 3-Way Split EP with Abandoncy and Nightosphere.

On September 29, 2023, they released their second album Silhouette Machine. Jeff Terich of Treble Magazine described the album as "louder", "sinister", "scathing", and as "an object of beauty and coarse aberration". They toured the West coast in late 2023 and when asked of their favorite shows they said Kilby Court in Salt Lake City, Utah was the best "vibe wise"

In 2025 they toured with the band Cryogeyser in the spring. In the fall they toured with Slow Crush and Teethe.

On July 11, 2025, they released their EP Object 1. Ahead of the EP they released "your silence is my favorite song" as a single on May 6 2025 as well as "depictions of the female body". The EP was "endcap or a starting-off point for future things" from Rose's perspective. It was described as "leaning into a pop structure, without losing their bite." Discussing the lyrics from the song "your silence is my favorite song" Rose said they are "like holding a mirror up to losers who think they run the world". The Aux Magazine said the new EP "builds on the emotional and sonic groundwork" of their first two albums. Regarding how performing live has changed their sound Brown said they realized if she wanted to enjoy performing and have fun they would need to stop writing "sad slow songs" and focus more on "faster and sassy songs".

In 2026 they toured the U.K. and Europe for the first time as well as the United States and Canada again. While on the tour they were deeply inspired by U.K. band Tummyache

Rose releases solo music under the name Window Seat. Cole and Zach have released the album DEAD END with another band named Guest Service.

== Music style ==
They have been described as slowcore, shoegaze, noise rock, post-hardcore and post-punk with a "cathartic" sound. They have been described as "‘80-era Sonic Youth" mixed with later post-punk developments. Patrick McNamera of Oh My Rockness named their sound as "darkly cinematic" and listed their Genre as Slowcore, Shoegaze, and Screamo. Henry Sheridan of KCOU (University of Missouri radio station) said their music "merges ethereal and entrancing vocals and melodies with blasts of fuzz and noise". Loud Women in a review added "the trio embraces the duality of hard and soft."

Rose Brown is the primary songwriter and typically comes to the band with mostly finished songs to polish and perform as a 3-piece. When asked about their thoughts of ever adding a 4th member to the band Rose said in 2024 they had thought about it so she can focus on the vocals more, but that it wasn't necessary for now.

They have listed Coco & Clair Clair, Sonic Youth, Blind Girls, PJ Harvey, Daïtro, Harvey Milk, The B-52s, Swans, Sleep, Helvetia, Wednesday, Hole, Cherry Glazerr, Code Orange, Abandoncy, Nightosphere, and Love, Claire as some of their favorite bands/ influences.

== Members ==
- Rose Brown – guitar and vocals
- Cole Billings – bass and backing vocals
- Zach Cunningham - drums

== Discography ==
=== Studio albums ===
- Flooding (2021)
- Silhouette Machine (2023)

=== Extended plays ===
- 3-Way Split (2023) (with Abandoncy and Nightosphere)
- object 1 (2025)
