= Employed to Serve =

British metalcore band

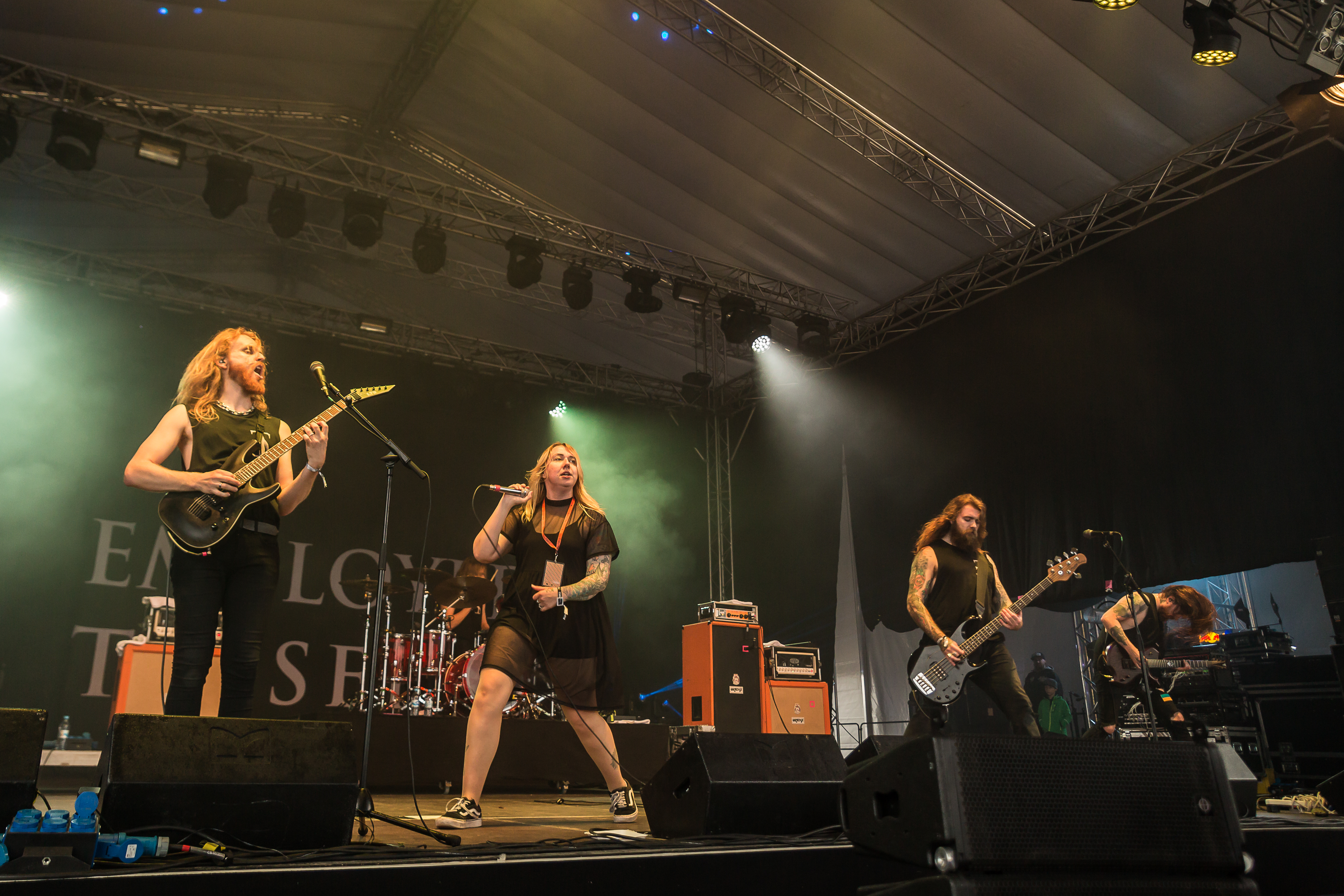
- Employed to Serve at With Full Force 2023

Background information
- Origin: Woking, England
- Genres: Metalcore; mathcore; hardcore punk
- Years active: 2011–present
- Labels: Puzzle; Holy Roar; Spinefarm
- Members: Justine Jones; Sammy Urwin; David Porter; Nathan Pryor; Casey McHale
- Website: employedtoserve.com

Employed to Serve is a British metalcore band from Woking, England.

== History ==
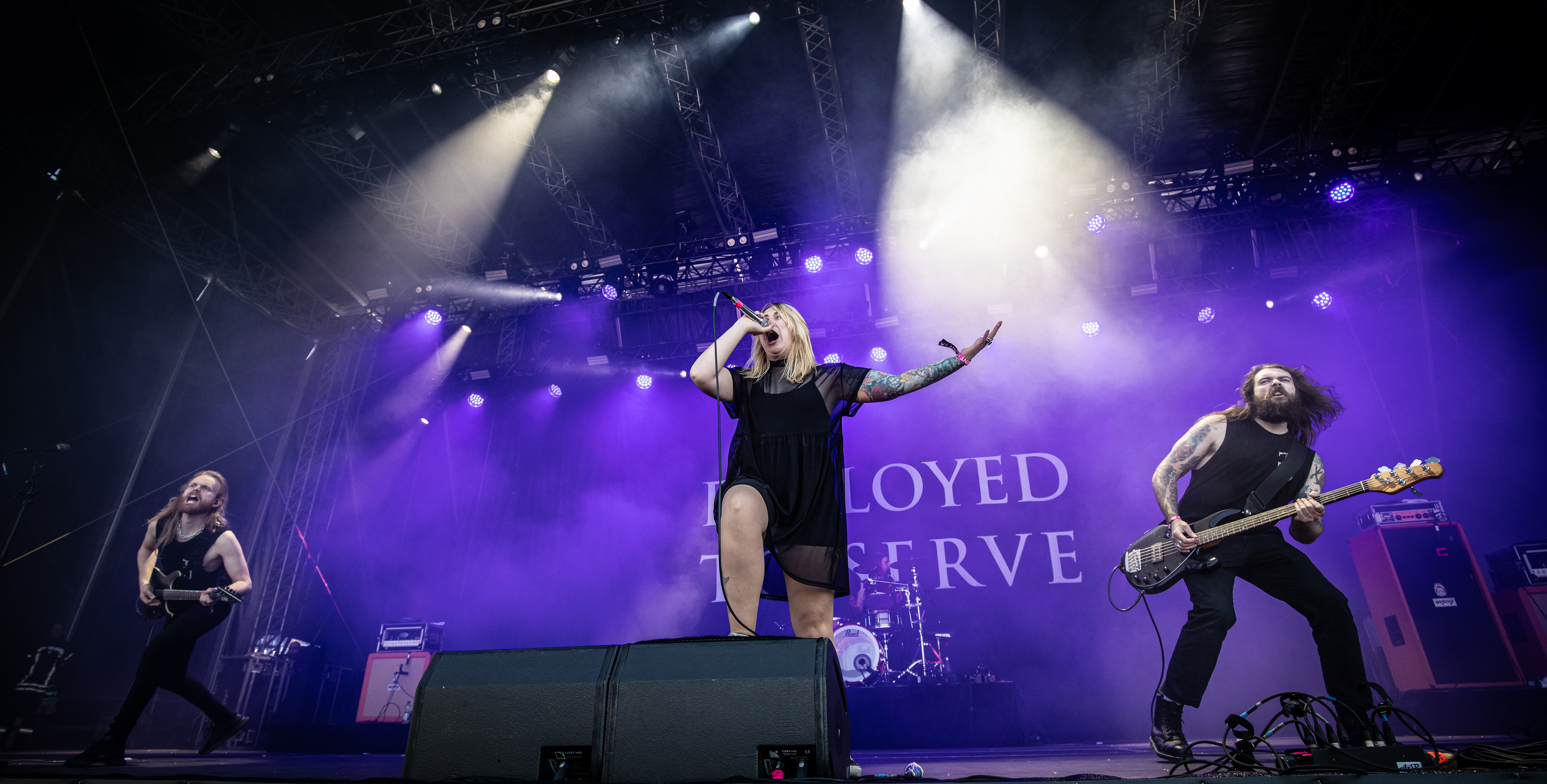
Employed to Serve live at Rock am Ring 2023

Employed to Serve was formed in 2011 by current members Justine Jones and Sammy Urwin. In July 2020, several members of Employed to Serve and Renounced released an EP as the side project Glorious.

Their album Conquering was elected by Loudwire as the 41st best rock/metal album of 2021. The track "Exist" was elected by the same publication as the 6th best metal song of the same year.

On 22 January 2025 the band released Atonement, the first single from the group's upcoming album, Fallen Star. The track featured guest vocalist Will Ramos.

== Musical style ==
The group's sound has been described as a mixture of metalcore, mathcore, hardcore punk, post-hardcore and death metal, among other genres. Their earliest work was influenced by Bastions, Svalbard and Palm Reader. The band cited Machine Head, Testament and Exodus as influences on Conquering, their fourth full-length release.

== Members ==
- Justine Jones – vocals
- Sammy Urwin – guitar, vocals
- David Porter – guitar
- Nathan Pryor – bass
- Casey McHale – drums

== Discography ==
=== Studio albums ===
Title	Album details
Greyer Than You Remember	Released: 25 May 2015; Label: Holy Roar; Format: CD, LP
The Warmth of a Dying Sun	Released: 19 May 2017; Label: Holy Roar; Format: CD, LP
Eternal Forward Motion	Released: 10 May 2019; Label: Spinefarm; Format: CD, LP
Conquering	Released: 17 September 2021; Label: Spinefarm; Format: CD, LP
Fallen Star	Release: 25 April 2025; Label: Spinefarm; Format: CD, LP

=== Extended plays ===
Year	Album	Label
2012	Long Time Dead	Puzzle Records
2013	Counting Crows	Puzzle Records
2014	Change Nothing Regret Everything	Holy Roar Records
