= The Weight of the Mask =

Studio album by Svalbard
- Released: 6 October 2023
- Recorded: February 2023
- Studio: The Ranch Production House (Southampton)
- Genres: Post-hardcore; post-metal
- Length: 44:16
- Label: Nuclear Blast
- Producer: Lewis Johns

Svalbard chronology
When I Die, Will I Get Better? (2020)	The Weight of the Mask (2023)

Singles from The Weight of the Mask
- 1. "Eternal Spirits" Released: 27 February 2023; 2. "Faking It" Released: 12 July 2023; 3. "How to Swim Down" Released: 15 August 2023

The Weight of the Mask is the fourth and final studio album by British post-hardcore band Svalbard, released on 6 October 2023 through Nuclear Blast Records. It is the band's only album with bassist Matt Francis. After initial writing sessions were hindered by the COVID-19 pandemic, Svalbard began working on new material in April 2021, before recording the album in February 2023 with long-time producer Lewis Johns at The Ranch Production House in Southampton. Developing from the style of its predecessor When I Die, Will I Get Better? (2020), the album saw the band experiment with its sound, production, and instrumentation. Lyrically, it eschews the social and political themes of its previous albums, with a focus on mental health, anxiety, depression, and love.

The Weight of the Mask debuted and peaked number 29 on the UK Independent Albums Chart and received praise for its songwriting, emotional lyrics and themes; Bandcamp Daily, Blabbermouth.net and Kerrang! considered it to be Svalbard's best album. The band supported the album with numerous festival appearances and headlining tours of Europe, Australia and Japan, alongside supporting tours with Cult of Luna, Enslaved and Alcest.

== Background and recording ==
Svalbard began writing material for The Weight of the Mask soon after the recording of their third album, When I Die, Will I Get Better?, in early 2020. Writing was initially hindered due to the COVID-19 pandemic, which prevented Svalbard from working on material in person, and co-lead vocalist and lead guitarist Serena Cherry said that it "took a while [for the band] to find each other again". Guitarist and co-lead vocalist Liam Phelan stated that the pandemic nevertheless gave the band a creative push, helping bring out more of an emotional edge to Cherry's lyrics and his music. On 24 April 2021, the band announced that they had started writing their fourth album. Svalbard worked on material at their practice space in Bristol; although half of the band's members were split between there and London, they arranged to meet up on weekends instead of "[emailing] each other riffs".

In June 2022, Svalbard were signed to Nuclear Blast Records. Cherry said that the label approached them following the success of When I Die, Will I Get Better?, and that their "vision for working with us seemed to really fit with what we wanted to do". She described the signing as a "dream come true" for her, as most of the bands she was inspired by (including Nightwish, her favourite band) had released albums through the label. At the same time, Svalbard grew concerned that their material would be not be "good enough" for Nuclear Blast and live up to the acclaim of When I Die, Will I Get Better?. The band subsequently began to approach its songwriting more analytically than before, scrapping six songs worth—approximately half—of their material in the process.

In February 2023, Svalbard recorded The Weight of the Mask with long-time producer Lewis Johns at The Ranch Production House in Southampton. Cherry stated that "When you've worked with a producer for so many years, you feel so comfortable fully expressing yourself in the studio", and that Johns provided her with "a safe space" to express her emotions, both musically and lyrically. She provided Johns with Insomnium's Anno 1696 (2023) to use as a production reference during recording, citing its "clarity with the guitars [as] a huge benchmark for me".

== Composition and lyrics ==
=== Overview ===
Musically, The Weight of the Mask has been primarily described as post-hardcore and post-metal. Reviewers also highlighted elements from black metal, melodic death metal, power metal, metalcore, post-rock and blackgaze across the album. Metal Hammer UK described the album as "simultaneously the prettiest and bleakest Svalbard have sounded to date". The album retains the genre-combining style of When I Die, Will I Get Better?, whilst featuring more polished and modern-sounding production than its predecessor. BrooklynVegan felt that the album's "glossy" production added a "sleek exterior to [its] aggression and darkness." Cherry said that the album features more technical guitar parts, segments forgoing reverb effects, and synth pads, which Svalbard began using on their previous album. The album also incorporates violins on tracks such as "Defiance" and "How to Swim Down", performed by Phelan. In an interview with Kerrang!, Cherry said she was inspired to incorporate violins after seeing Phelan perform with his other band Morrow, and compared their use to My Dying Bride. Svalbard had previously attempted incorporate violins into When I Die, Will I Get Better?, but found they "didn't sound right" for the album.

According to Bandcamp Daily, The Weight of the Mask is "the first Svalbard album that’s thematically focused entirely inward". Its lyrics focus on themes of mental health, anxiety, depression and love, eschewing the social and political themes of their previous albums. In an interview with Distorted Sound, Cherry said that where When I Die, Will I Get Better? represented "the light at the end of the tunnel", The Weight of the Mask was "the tunnel at the end of the light". The album's lyrics are presented in a direct and blunt manner, and do not use metaphors. Cherry believed that using this approach allowed for Svalbard's lyrics to better connect with people and make them feel less alone. She attributed its lack of political lyrics to her exhaustion with the contemporary political situation in the United Kingdom, and the fact she was "so consumed by [her] internal darkness" around the time of the album's writing.

=== Songs ===
"Faking It" is about the problems that forced positivity can have on those who suffer from depression, who "can feel guilted into putting on a happy mask". "Eternal Spirits" was written as a tribute to deceased musicians within the metal community; the song was specifically dedicated to Joey Jordison, former drummer of Slipknot, who died in 2021. Cherry described "November" as "sort-of anti-Christmas song – it's for everyone else out there who finds that time of year hard, when every other Christmas song is talking about how magical this time of year is." The song features spoken word elements inspired by the Saturnus song "For Your Demons". Titled after the 2003 album of the same name by Antimatter, "Lights Out" details the struggle of reaching out "when you’re falling apart". The song was originally written for When I Die, Will I Get Better? in 2019, but left off as Svalbard were unable to "piece it together effectively".

"How to Swim Down" is about unrequited love; Cherry wrote the song from the perspective of a World of Warcraft healer to "illustrate this point, of selflessly pouring your energy into someone from a distance". The song also drew influence from "Misty's Song", from the Pokémon anime compilation album Pokémon 2.B.A. Master (1999). Originally intended to be an instrumental bonus track, Johns helped Svalbard develop the song by encouraging them to add more instrumental and vocal layers; it is also the band's first to feature solely clean vocals. "Be My Tomb" is about "lovelessness and loneliness". Cherry was inspired to write the song after listening to "Empty Rooms" by Gary Moore. "Pillar in the Sand" is about "something that outlasts everything else - when something has the same magical feeling every time you come back to it". For Cherry, this was Fright Nights at Thorpe Park, which she has visited since she was a teenager; she had previously helped compose music for the event's Creek Freak Massacre maze in 2019. "To Wilt Beneath the Weight" is about the stresses associated with being a touring musician, and being honest about "the dark reality of your demons".

== Release and promotion ==
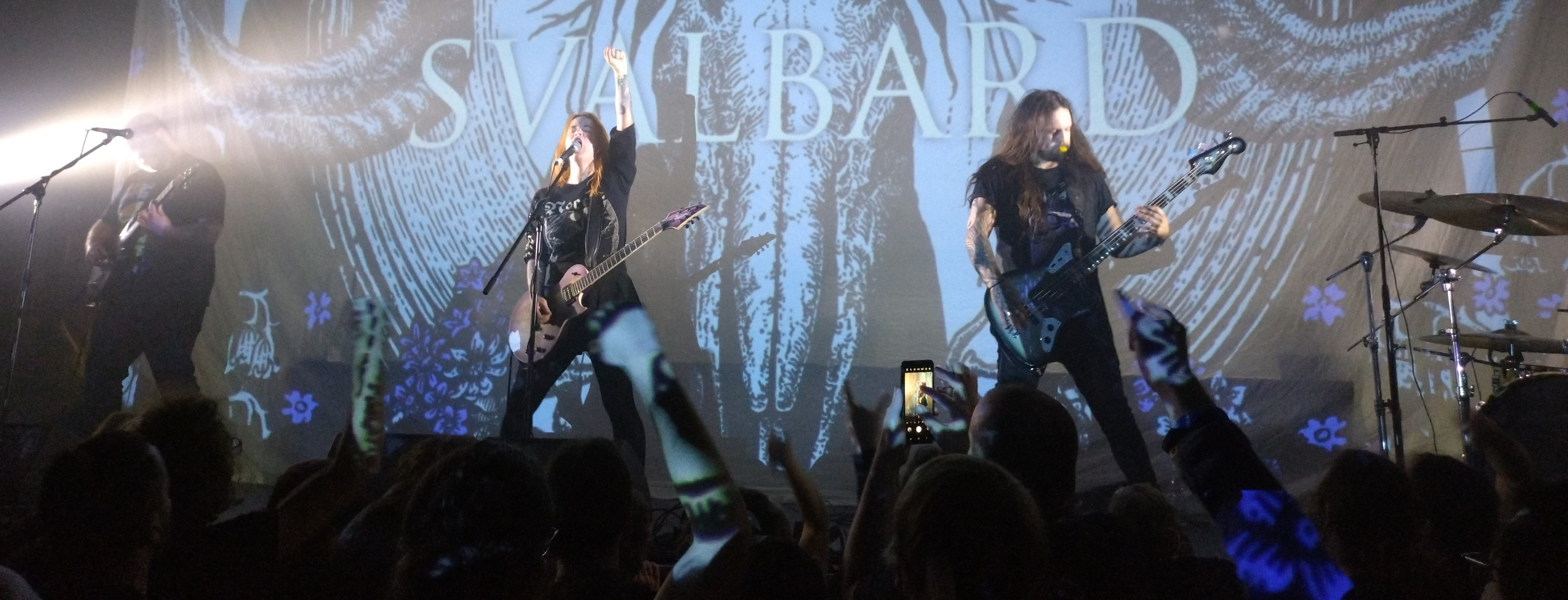
Svalbard performing in Prague in November 2024

Svalbard "unofficially" began the promotional cycle for The Weight of the Mask with the release of the album's lead single, "Eternal Spirits", on 27 February 2023. After the single's release, the band joined Cult of Luna for a tour of Europe from 17 March to 31 March 2023. Svalbard then played at several European festivals between May and August 2023, including Hellfest, 2000trees, and ArcTanGent. On 12 July 2023, Svalbard announced the release of The Weight of the Mask and released "Faking It" as the album's second single. Its music video was inspired by "Everybody's Fool" by Evanescence. On 15 August 2023, "How to Swim Down" was released as the third single, coupled with an animated music video directed by Boy Tillkens and storyboarded by Cherry. The album was released on 6 October 2023, and debuted at number 29 on the UK Independent Albums Chart and number 79 on the Scottish Albums Chart.

Following the album's release, Svalbard embarked on a second tour of Europe between 14 October and 21 October 2023. On 31 January 2024, the band released a live music video for "To Wilt Beneath the Weight", filmed at the 2023 Beyond the Redshift Festival at the O2 Forum in London. Between 6 March and 24 March 2024, Svalbard and Wayfarer supported Enslaved on their first European club tour since 2018. Between 18 May and 20 May 2024, Svalbard toured Japan with Kokeshi, before embarking on their first tour of Australia between 23 May and 26 May 2024, supported by RUN. From 13 November to 14 December 2024, Svalbard and Doodeskader opened for Alcest on the European leg of their Les Chants de l'Aurore tour.

== Critical reception ==
Professional ratings
Review scores
Source	Rating
Blabbermouth.net	8.5/10
Dork	4/5 stars
Kerrang!	5/5
Metal.de	9/10
Metal Hammer UK	4.5/5 stars
Metal Hammer Germany	5/7
Outburn	7/10
Ox-Fanzine	5/5 stars
Rock Hard	7.5/10
Sputnikmusic	4.5/5

Kerrang!'s Emma Wilkes called The Weight of the Mask Svalbard's "masterpiece" and praised its emotional weight and directness. Spencer Hughes of Bandcamp Daily similarly viewed the album as Svalbard's best, calling it "a moving account of battling through the lowest depths of depression [...] and proof that Svalbard is an established, reliable force in the metal scene." Ox-Fanzine's Roman Eisner praised its "clearly formulated" lyrics and well-illustrated portrayal of depression, as well as its variety. Blabbermouth.net's Dom Lawson said that the album "rocks with a vigor and vitality that could never be anything but uplifting" and considered it to be Svalbard's best album "by far".

Lothar Gerber of Metal Hammer Germany highlighted the album's "numerous guitar melodies and emotional harmonies" while singling out Matt Francis for his performance on bass. Danni Leivers of Metal Hammer UK said that its balance of heaviness and vulnerability showcased the extent of Svalbard's songwriting developments from When I Die, Will I Get Better?, stating: "The album hangs together cohesively and purposefully, an exercise of extremes that never offers answers, but that stands as a stunning monument to the human experience." Thomas Mahnke of Metal.de felt that its "well thought out" songwriting should "open [Svalbard] up to a new audience without alienating older listeners." Steve Loftin of Dork found that the band's overt confidence and diversity "[gave] armament to [its] hefty subject matter", and claimed that it boosted their status as "one of Britain’s great new heavy bands [...] one-hundred fold".

The Weight of the Mask was ranked at number 12 on Kerrang!'s list of the "50 best albums of 2023", and at number 6 on Metal Hammer's equivalent list. Metal.de named it the best post-rock/metal album of 2023. The album won the award for "Best Metalgaze Album" at the 2023 Metal Storm Awards, while its cover (by Hestor Aspland) was nominated in the "Best Album Artwork" category at the Heavy Music Awards 2024.

== Track listing ==
All lyrics are written by Serena Cherry; all music is composed by Svalbard.

No.	Title	Length
1.	"Faking It"	5:28
2.	"Eternal Spirits"	3:35
3.	"Defiance"	5:52
4.	"November"	4:56
5.	"Lights Out"	5:28
6.	"How to Swim Down"	4:05
7.	"Be My Tomb"	4:55
8.	"Pillar in the Sand"	4:18
9.	"To Wilt Beneath the Weight"	5:39
Total length:		44:16

Notes

- String arrangements by Liam Phelan, Lewis Johns and Olive.

== Personnel ==
Personnel per liner notes and Nuclear Blast.

Svalbard
- Serena Cherry – lead guitar, co-lead vocals
- Liam Phelan – rhythm guitar, violin, co-lead vocals
- Matt Francis – bass
- Mark Lilley – drums
Production
- Lewis Johns – production, mixing, engineering
- Grant Berry – mastering
- Matt Janke – assistant engineer
- Kel Pinchin – editing
- Sebastien Sendon – editing

Artwork

- Hestor Aspland – artwork
- Lee O'Connor – layout

== Charts ==
Chart performance for The Weight of the Mask
Chart (2023)	Peak position
Scottish Albums (Official Charts)	79
UK Album Downloads (Official Charts)	91
UK Independent Albums (Official Charts)	29
UK Rock & Metal Albums (Official Charts)	9

== Release history ==
Release history for The Weight of the Mask
Region	Date	Format	Label	Catalog #
Various	6 October 2023	CD; LP; DD	Nuclear Blast	NBR7034-1 (LP) NBR7034-2 (CD)
Brazil	26 October 2023	CD	Shinigami	NBSR300
Japan	3 November 2023	CD	Ward	GQCS-91397
