= Svalbard (band) =

British post-hardcore band

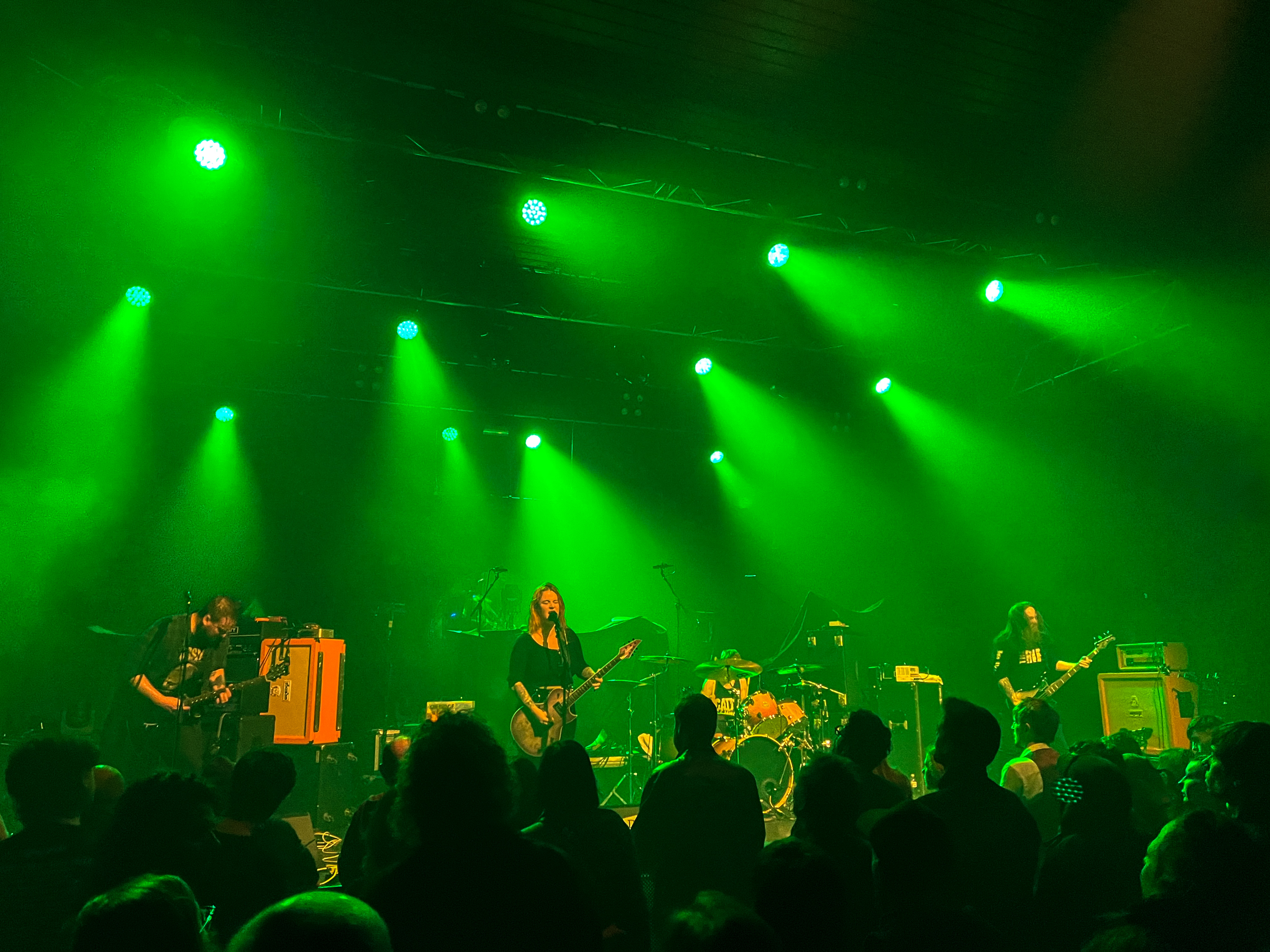
- Svalbard in Lausanne, Switzerland in 2023. From left to right: Liam Phelan, Serena Cherry, Mark Lilley and Matt Francis.

Background information
- Origin: Bristol, England
- Genres: Post-hardcore; post-metal
- Works: Svalbard discography
- Years active: 2011–2026
- Labels: Tangled Talk; Holy Roar; Through Love; Halo of Flies; Translation Loss; Tokyo Jupiter; Church Road; Nuclear Blast
- Spinoffs: Noctule
- Spinoff of: More Than Life, Burning Skies
- Past members: Serena Cherry; Mark Lilley; Liam Phelan; Matt Francis; Mike Thompson; Ben Thomas; Christian Prince; Tony James; Adam Parrish; Alex Heffernan
- Website: svalbard.bandcamp.com
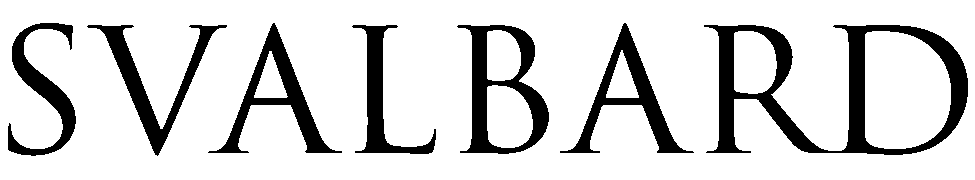

Svalbard were a British post-hardcore band from Bristol, England. The band was formed in 2011 by co-lead vocalists and guitarists Serena Cherry and Liam Phelan with drummer Mark Lilley; their longest-serving bassist, Matt Francis, joined in 2020. Primarily exhibiting a post-hardcore and post-metal sound, the band's style features elements of black metal, crust punk, post-rock and shoegaze.

Following the release of early material compiled on the compilation album Discography 2012–2014 (2015), Svalbard were signed to Holy Roar Records in January 2015. They released two albums, One Day All This Will End (2015) and It's Hard to Have Hope (2018), before parting ways with Holy Roar and moving to Church Road Records three weeks before the release of When I Die, Will I Get Better? (2020), due to sexual misconduct allegations against the label's founder. The band moved to Nuclear Blast Records for the release of their fourth and final album, The Weight of the Mask (2023). Citing creative and financial factors, Svalbard announced their disbandment in May 2025; following a series of farewell tours, the band performed their final show at ArcTanGent in August 2026.

== History ==
=== 2011–2013: Formation and early releases ===
Svalbard was formed in Bristol in 2011 by guitarists Serena Cherry and Liam Phelan and drummer Mark Lilley. Cherry and Phelan first met each other in Bath, Somerset, whilst Cherry was touring with her "weird post-rock solo project". They later met and recruited Lilley after hearing him play at a rehearsal studio, forming the core of the band. The band took their name from Philip Pullman's His Dark Materials trilogy, where the archipelago of Svalbard serves as a fictional setting (especially in Northern Lights). Cherry also said of the band's name:

Svalbard [...] is locked in a constant state of change – it is either freezing over in winter, or melting in summer. It never stays the same for long; I feel this is symbolic of the ways in which all art is never “in the moment” but in a state of either becoming, or reflecting upon, what it is going to be next.

Cherry, Phelan and Lilley would hold Svalbard's line-up constant throughout their early releases, and over the course of several line-up changes (particularly in regards to bassists). Svalbard recorded their eponymous debut EP in 2012 as a five-piece featuring bassist Ben Thomas and vocalist Mike Thompson, with neither Cherry nor Phelan wanting to handle vocal duties. However, when both members left the band shortly after it was recorded, they decided to split lead vocal duties between themselves. In 2013, the band recorded two EPs with bassist Christian Prince, Gone Tomorrow and Flightless Birds, whilst also contributing a cover of "This Is the End" by Victims to the four-way collaborative EP Cover Buzz (2013) with Pariso, MINE and Let It Die.

=== 2014–2019: One Day All This Will End and It's Hard to Have Hope ===
Svalbard began writing material for their debut album at their practice space in early 2014. Most of the album was written whilst the band were "in between bassists". During this time, Svalbard worked on a collaborative/split EP with Pariso, released on 7 July 2014. Pariso's guitarist, Alex Fitzpatrick, would subsequently sign Svalbard to his independent label, Holy Roar Records, in January 2015. Shortly after signing with the label, Svalbard released the compilation album Discography 2012-2014, featuring all of their recorded output up until that point. It was remastered by Brad Boatright and reissued in October 2016. Svalbard's debut album, One Day All This Will End, was released on 25 September 2015. Through Love handled the release in Germany and Halo of Flies in the US. Well-received by critics, the album's first pressing through Holy Roar sold out within the first week of its release. Music videos (created by Phelan) were released for the tracks "Disparity" and "Expect Equal Respect", the latter advocating for the acceptance of women within extreme music without treating them as anomalies. A split EP with The Tidal Sleep featuring one new song from each band followed on 15 January 2017; a music video (also filmed and edited by Phelan) for Svalbard's side of the split, "Open the Cages", was released on 12 November 2016.

Svalbard entered a period of turmoil following touring in support of One Day All This Will End due to the long-term illnesses of Cherry and Phelan and the departure of their bassist. After recruiting bassist Adam Parrish, the band regrouped to record their second album It's Hard to Have Hope in September 2017. Expanding on the heavier and melodic tendencies of One Day All This Will End, the album was noted for its social and political themes, covering unpaid internships, revenge porn, feminism, abortion, animal welfare, sexual assault and long-term illness. Following the album's release on 25 May 2018, Svalbard embarked on tours of Europe and the United Kingdom, which included a performance at the 2018 ArcTanGent Festival and supporting dates with OHHMS and La Dispute. In early 2019, Parrish left Svalbard and was replaced by Alex Heffernan. Heffernan had briefly filled in on bass for Svalbard in 2016; although he declined an offer to join the band back then, he would express interest in doing so shortly before Parrish left the band. Afterwards, Svalbard performed at the 2019 Roadburn Festival as part of a Holy Roar Records showcase, before embarking on their first ever tour of Japan with The Tidal Sleep in May 2019.

=== 2020–2024: Label changes, When I Die, Will I Get Better? and The Weight of the Mask ===
In early July 2020, Svalbard announced their third studio album When I Die, Will I Get Better? for a mid-September release through Holy Roar. Three weeks before the album's planned release, the band severed their ties and associations with Holy Roar due to the recent sexual misconduct allegations against its founder Alex Fitzpatrick. The band subsequently signed with Church Road Records and would release the album with them on September 25, as well as arrange refunds for people who preordered the album through Holy Roar. Metal Hammer named it as the 5th best metal album of 2020. On 11 December 2020, Svalbard played their last show with Heffernan, who wanted to concentrate on a career in graphic design, at the Kerrang! K! Pit in London. He was replaced by Matt Francis.

On 28 June 2022, Svalbard signed to Nuclear Blast Records. As part of their signing to the label, Nuclear Blast acquired the rights to the band's albums released through Holy Roar. They released their fourth album, The Weight of the Mask, on 6 October 2023.

=== 2025–2026: Disbandment and farewell tours ===
On 28 May 2025, the band announced they would be disbanding in 2026 following some farewell tours and shows, starting with a UK tour in November 2025. In a statement to Metal Hammer, Cherry said that the split was amicable between Svalbard's members and cited the band's desire to avoid a creative slump and financial factors. On 17 November 2025, the band released their final single, "If We Could Still Be Saved". In May 2026, Svalbard embarked on their final European tour and performed only ever North American concert at the Prepare the Ground festival in Toronto, Canada; in an interview with Heavy Stories, Cherry said that visa costs and customs issues had made it impossible for them to tour the continent. The band performed their final show at ArcTanGent on 19 August 2026.

== Musical style and influences ==
Svalbard's sound has been primarily been described as post-hardcore and post-metal, as well as screamo, hardcore punk, crust punk, D-beat, melodic hardcore, black metal, "blackened hardcore" and post-rock. (Note: Musical styles: "post-hardcore": "post-metal": "screamo": "hardcore punk": "D-beat/crust punk": "melodic hardcore": "black metal": "blackened hardcore": "post-rock":) Whilst Svalbard's output has consistently displayed elements of post-rock, crust punk and black metal, their later albums since It's Hard to Have Hope have been noted for introducing more metal, atmospheric and shoegaze elements. The members of Svalbard have cited bands including Alcest, Cattle Decapitation, Converge, Efterklang, Explosions in the Sky, Fuck the Facts, Helmet, Keep of Kalessin, Mew, Mogwai, Mono, My Dying Bride, Nasum, Emma Ruth Rundle, Slipknot and This Will Destroy You as musical influences. Cherry has also cited the soundtracks to The Elder Scrolls V: Skyrim and the Kingdom Hearts and Final Fantasy series as influences on her guitar leads for the band.

From 2014 onwards, all of Svalbard's recorded output was produced by Lewis Johns at the Ranch Production House in Southampton. In a 2023 interview with Echoes and Dust, Cherry called Johns "the fifth member of Svalbard", praising his ability to "[draw] the best out of [the band] musically".

== Band members ==
Svalbard at Full Force 2023

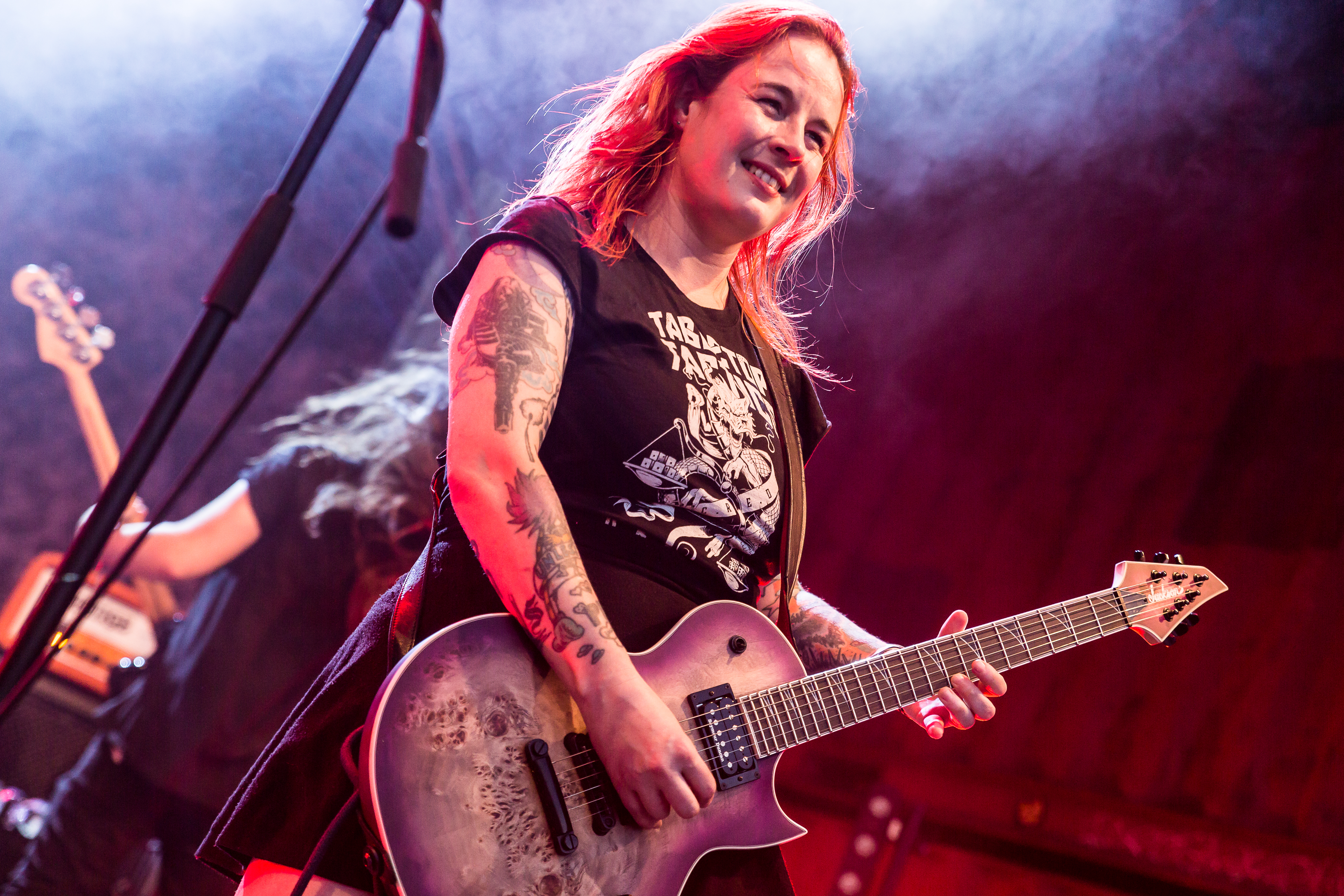
Serena Cherry

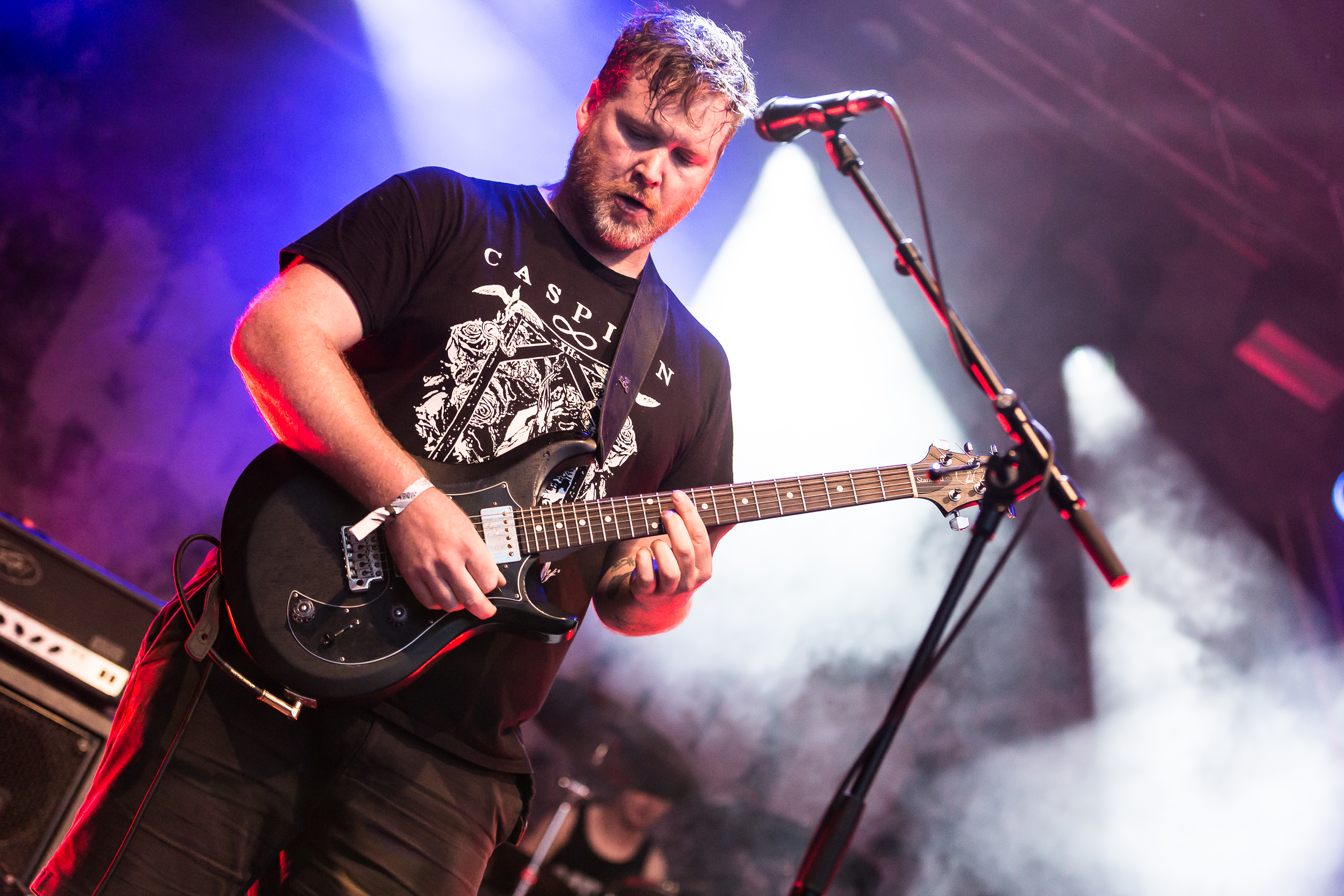
Liam Phelan

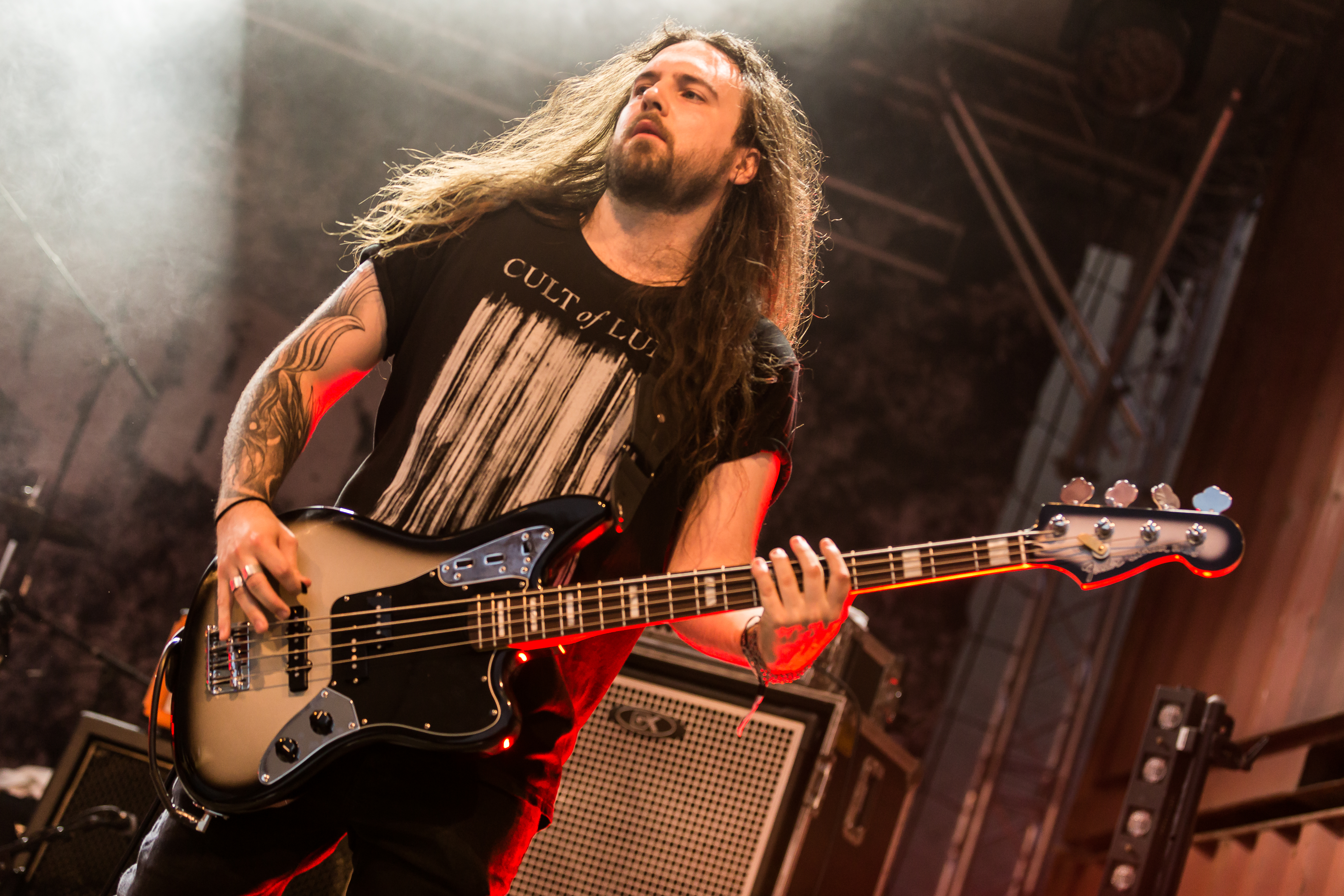
Matt Francis

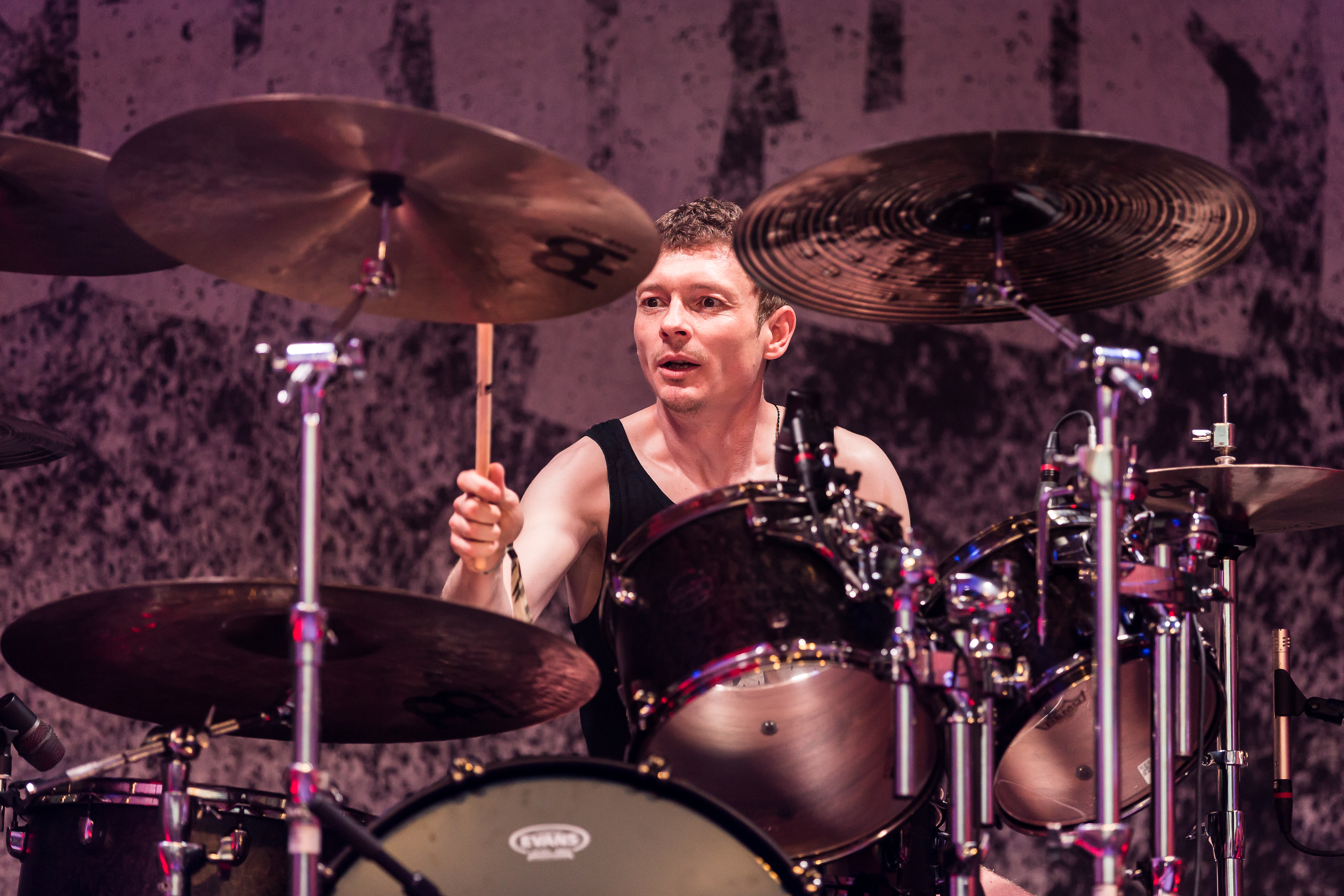
Mark Lilley

Final lineup

- Serena Cherry – lead guitar (2011–2026), co-lead vocals (2013–2026), backing vocals (2012)
- Liam Phelan – rhythm guitar, violin (2011–2026), co-lead vocals (2013–2026)
- Matt Francis – bass (2020–2026)
- Mark Lilley – drums (2011–2026)

Former

- Mike Thompson – lead vocals (2012)
- Ben Thomas – bass (2012)
- Christian Prince – bass (2013–2014)
- Tony James – bass (2015–2016)
- Adam Parrish – bass (2017–2019)
- Alex Heffernan – bass (2019–2020), touring bassist (2016)

Timeline

== Awards and nominations ==
Kerrang! Awards
Year	Nominee / work	Award	Result	Ref.
2019	Themselves	Best British Breakthrough Act	Nominated	

Metal Storm Awards
Year	Nominee / work	Award	Result	Ref.
2023	The Weight of the Mask	Best Metalgaze Album	Won	

Heavy Music Awards
Year	Nominee / work	Award	Result	Ref.
2024	The Weight of the Mask	Best Album Artwork	Nominated	

== Discography ==
Studio albums

- One Day All This Will End (2015)
- It's Hard to Have Hope (2018)
- When I Die, Will I Get Better? (2020)
- The Weight of the Mask (2023)
