= Church Road Records =

British independent record label

- "From the extreme to the serene"
- Founded: 2017; 9 years ago
- Founder: Sammy Urwin
- Genre: Heavy metal; extreme metal; hardcore punk; shoegaze
- Country of origin: United Kingdom
- Location: Woking, England
- Official website: churchroadrecords.com

Church Road Records is a British independent record label, founded in 2017. It is co-run by Sammy Urwin and Justine Jones, both of Employed to Serve. Originally founded as a mail-order distribution label, it was established as a proper record label in September 2020.

== History ==
Church Road Records was originally founded in 2017 by Employed to Serve guitarist and vocalist Sammy Urwin. Taking its name from a street in Employed to Serve's hometown of Woking, the label originally existed primarily as a mail-order distributor stocking releases Urwin personally curated, and from labels including Revelation Records and Deathwish Inc. Church Road's record label arm mainly served as a means for Urwin to print small runs of albums by his friend's bands. The label's first release was the 2018 debut album of Urwin's grindcore side project Motormouth.

On 7 September 2020, several women accused Alex Fitzpatrick, the founder of Holy Roar Records (whom Employed to Serve had been signed to previously), of rape and sexual misconduct, which Fitzpatrick has denied. This resulted in all of Holy Roar's staff and bands immediately severing ties with the label. Within a few days of its closure, Urwin and Justine Jones (also of Employed to Serve, and a former manager at Holy Roar) converted Church Road Records into a proper record label in order to release several albums that were imminently due for release through Holy Roar, including Svalbard's When I Die, Will I Get Better?, Palm Reader's Sleepless and Respire's Black Line. As the record sleeves for these albums had already been printed, Jones ordered 3,000 stickers featuring a logo for Church Road Records that she and Urwin (with the assistance of Urwin's mum and sister as well as Svalbard members Serena Cherry and Liam Phelan) used to cover up the Holy Roar logo. Church Road also acquired the digital rights to the albums via TuneCore. When I Die, Will I Get Better?, Sleepless and Black Line all proved to be critical and commercial successes for the label, with the albums ending up on several critics' end-of-year lists and receiving multiple pressings months after they were first released. By September 2021, Church Road Records had a roster of 20 bands.

On 6 August 2022, Church Road Records celebrated its 5th birthday with a showcase at The Black Heart in London, with performances from Candescent A.D., Burner, Graywave, Noctule and Tuskar.

== Organisation ==
In a 2021 interview with Kerrang!, Jones said that she and Urwin set up Church Road Records "because we feel there’s a huge gap in the UK scene for labels like ours – labels that help grassroots bands rise so they can play academy-sized venues. A lot of the bigger labels aren’t really interested in small club bands because of the time and money that has to go into them. Our size of label is perfect for that." The label's mail order service was initially run from a bedroom in Jones' and Urwin's house, but was later outsourced to Awesome Merch "because we had boxes everywhere and it was basically a fire hazard", Jones said.

Church Road also runs a monthly subscription club for their releases (in both digital and physical formats), an idea that Jones previously established whilst working for Holy Roar. Jones said that the subscription club allowed her to not worry as much about the sales of Church Road's artists, and felt that it also gave unknown artists free publicity.

== Artists ==
Current

- Burner
- Inhuman Nature
- Lowen
- Still in Love
- Underdark
- Wallowing
- Wren

Alumni

- Celestial Sanctuary
- Heriot
- Noctule
- Palm Reader
- Slow Crush
- Svalbard
- Zetra
