= Brad Boatright =

Bradley Boatright
- Origin: Portland, Oregon
- Genres: Punk; heavy metal
- Occupations: Songwriter; musician; engineer; producer; former service writer at MotoCorsa
- Instrument: Guitar
- Years active: 1997–present
- Labels: Jade Tree; Southern Lord Records; Havoc Records; Moshpit Tragedy
- Website: audiosiegepdx.com

Bradley Boatright (born 1976) is a musician, record producer, and mastering engineer based in Portland, Oregon. He is known as a guitarist and vocalist in From Ashes Rise and The Cooters in addition to being a mastering engineer at Audiosiege, credited on recordings by Off!, American Standards, Sleep, Noothgrush, Pierced Arrows, and other artists.

On December 25, 2011, he launched his own recording label, Audiosiege Media, a division of Moshpit Tragedy Records. Audiosiege releases often feature production from his studio in Portland.

== Discography (as musician) ==
=== With The Cooters ===
- S/T 7-inch EP Assault With Intent To Free (1994)
- Grisham's Army(1995)
- Invasion of The Cooters (1996)
- The Moon Will Rise Again (1998)

=== With From Ashes Rise (guitar/vocals) ===
- Fragments of a Fallen Sky 7-inch EP Clean Plate Records (1997)
- Life And Death 7-inch EP Partners in Crime Records (1998)
- Concrete And Steel LP Feral Ward Records (2000)
- Silence LP Feral Ward Records (2001)
- Split LP with Victims Havoc Records (2002)
- Nightmares LP Jade Tree Records (2003)
- Live Hell LP Jade Tree Records (2010)

=== With Lebanon (vocals/guitar) ===
- Overdose/Overload 7-inch Single Southern Lord Records (2009)

=== With Warcry (guitar) ===
- Harvest of Death 7-inch EP Feral Ward Records (2002)
- Maniacs on Pedestals LP Feral Ward Records (2004)
- Deprogram LP Feral Ward Records (2006)

=== With World Burns to Death (guitar) ===
- The Sucking of the Missile Cock... LP Hardcore Holocaust Records (2002)
- No Dawn Comes ... Night Without End 7-inch EP Prank Records (2003)
- Art of self-destruction 7-inch EP Hardcore Holocaust Records (2003)

=== With No Parade (guitar/vocals) ===
- Nightsticks And Justice EP Partners in Crime Records (2000)
- Ceaseless Fire LP Partners in Crime Records (2001)

=== With Deathreat (bass) ===
- The Severing of the Last Barred Window LP Partners in Crime Records (1999)
- Consider It War LP Partners in Crime Records (2001)
- Double Death Blow- Split 7-inch with D.S.B. Mangrove Records (2001)
