= Holy Roar Records =

British independent record label

- Founded: January 2006; 20 years ago
- Founder: Alex Fitzpatrick; Ellen Godwin
- Defunct: 30 March 2021; 5 years ago
- Status: Defunct
- Genre: Hardcore punk, punk rock, extreme metal, experimental rock
- Country of origin: United Kingdom
- Location: London, England
- Official website: www.holyroarrecords.com

Holy Roar Records was an independent record label run by Alex Fitzpatrick. The label began in January 2006 and put out its first release, the Phoenix Bodies album, Raise the Bullshit Flag in June 2006. Fitzpatrick originally joked that the name was derived from a vision he had while using the hallucinogen LSD. According to Fitzpatrick, the name “Holy Roar” was derived from a Torche song with the same title.

== History ==
Holy Roar Records was formed at the beginning of 2006, when Alex Fitzpatrick moved to London. After previously trialling “the communion” with friends in Birmingham during his university days, he and his girlfriend at the time, Ellen Godwin decided to start up a record label. Utilising a loan, they released and promoted Rolo Tomassi (their first “proper” EP), Phoenix Bodies (a grind/punk crossover band) and a split between the bands, Kayo Dot and Bloody Panda. In 2007, Holy Roar Records released records by Gallows, Chronicles of Adam West (tech-metal) and Chariots (screamo). The label was still a hobby at this point, but Fitzpatrick decided to throw in his day job and take the label on as a priority.

Holy Roar Records curated a stage at Offset Festival (2014), hosted a stage at Incubate Festival (2014), partnered with Shock Records, partnered with ArcTanGent Festival (2015) and curated a stage at The Great Escape Festival in 2016.

Holy Roar Records had over 150 releases and nominations by Metal Hammer Golden Gods Awards for “Best Independent Label” and the AIM Independent Music Awards for "Best Small Label" in 2016. The label continued growing and releasing records successfully until it's closure in late 2020. A few days after Holy Roar's closure, Sammy Urwin and Justine Jones of Employed to Serve, (who were signed to Holy Roar before moving to Spinefarm Records in 2019) set up Church Road Records in order to release several albums that were supposed to be released through the label, including Svalbard's When I Die, Will I Get Better?, Palm Reader's Sleepless and Respire's Black Line. Holy Roar was officially dissolved on 30 March 2021.

== Other activities ==
Since April 2015, Holy Roar Records has been producing podcasts hosted by Mario John Gambardella featuring different guests and their perspectives on the UK music scene.

Since 2010, Holy Roar Records has been a member of Pink Mist, a London-based promoter and label collective alongside Big Scary Monsters and Blood & Biscuits. The idea behind this collective was to create an alliance whereby resources were pooled in order to promote their bands to a wider audience. Their first release was a pink and white 12" vinyl limited to 300 copies and released in April 2011 on Record Store Day, "Hello Pink Mist". It consisted of 12 exclusive tracks (4 from each label) in which Holy Roar Records contributed tracks from run, WALK!, Hang the Bastard, Grazes and Bastions. Later that year, Tangled Talk joined the collective to complete the current line-up.

In 2012, they released a download-only free compilation "Hello Pink Mist Volume 2" to coincide with the launch of their new website and in this same year, they were nominated for the Association of Independent Music Awards for "Best Small Label". In 2013, Pink Mist announced a pop-up shop in Boxpark, East London where they sold records and had in-store sessions and in 2014 they collaborated with Relentless (drink) to set up another pop-up shop at No.5 Denmark Street featuring live performances. Pink Mist was also listed in The Guardian's "The 10 British Record Labels Defining the Sound of 2014".

In 2015, Holy Roar Records launched a new sister label, Truthseeker Music, headed up by Holy Roar intern Alex Leat.

== Artists ==
- Apologies, I Have None
- Bastions
- Bloody Panda
- Bongripper
- Bossk
- Brontide
- Brutality Will Prevail
- Coliseum
- Conan
- Dananananaykroyd
- Devil Sold His Soul
- Down I Go
- Employed to Serve
- Full of Hell
- Gallows
- The Ghost of a Thousand
- Ithaca
- Kayo Dot
- Kerouac
- Make Do and Mend
- Narrow Head
- Portrayal of Guilt
- Pulled Apart By Horses
- Rolo Tomassi
- Strife
- Svalbard
- Talons
- This is Hell
- Touché Amoré
- THROES
- Trash Talk
- Will Haven
- Young Legionnaire
- Youves
