= Mallory Knox discography =

- Studio albums: 3
- EPs: 3
- Singles: 10
- Music videos: 12
- Other songs: 1

This is the discography of British rock band Mallory Knox. They currently have released three studio albums, three EPs and ten singles.

== Studio albums ==
List of studio albums
Title	Album details	Peak chart positions
Title	Album details	UK
Signals	Release: 21 January 2013; Label: A Wolf at Your Door (WYD043); Formats: CD, DL, LP	33
Asymmetry	Release: 24 October 2014; Label: Search and Destroy, Epic (88843094262); Formats: CD, DL, LP	16
Wired	Release: 10 March 2017; Label: RCA (88985388032); Formats: CD, DL, LP	18
Mallory Knox	Release: 16 August 2019; Label: A Wolf At Your Door Records; Formats: CD, DL, LP	

== Extended plays ==
List of extended plays
Title	Album details
Pilot	Release: 4 July 2011; Label: A Wolf at Your Door; Formats: CD, DL
Pilot Acoustic	Release: 13 July 2012; Label: A Wolf at Your Door; Formats: DL
Unwired	Release: 5 May 2017; Label: Sony Music Entertainment; Formats: DL

== Singles ==
Title	Year	Album
"Death Rattle"	2012	Signals
"Wake Up"	2012	Signals
"Lighthouse"	2013	Signals
"Ghost in the Mirror"	2014	Asymmetry
"Shout at the Moon"	2014	Asymmetry
"Giving It Up"	2016	Wired
"Lucky Me"	2017	Wired
"Better Off Without You"	2017	Wired
"Yellow"	2017	Non-album single
"Sugar"	2017	Non-album single
"Black Holes"	2018	Non-album single
"White Lies"	2019	Mallory Knox
"Guts"	2019	Mallory Knox
"Livewire"	2019	Mallory Knox
"Wherever"	2019	Mallory Knox

=== Other songs ===
Title	Year	Album
"Try" (P!nk cover)	2013	BBC Radio 1's Live Lounge 2013

=== As featured artist ===
Title	Year	Album	Artist
"Sperenza" (feat. Mallory Knox)	2012	Your Love	Tu Amore
"Maybe" (feat. Mikey Chapman & Sam Douglas)	2013	Almost There	Heart in Hand

== Music videos ==
Title	Year	Album	Director	Type	Link
"Oceans"	2011	Pilot EP	Chris Stockings^{A}^{A}	Performance	
"Resuscitate"	2011	Pilot EP	Chris Stockings^{A}^{A}	Performance	
"Hello" (ver. 1)	2012	Signals	Michael Dickinson^{A}	Live footage	
"Resuscitate" (acoustic)	2012	Pilot Acoustic EP	Unknown	Performance	
"Oceans" (acoustic)	2012	Pilot Acoustic EP	Unknown	Performance	
"Keeping Secrets" (acoustic)	2012	Pilot Acoustic EP	Unknown	Performance	
"Death Rattle"	2012	Signals	Chris Stockings^{A}	Narrative	
"Wake Up"	2012	Signals	Daniel Broadley^{A}^{A}	Narrative	
"Lighthouse"	2013	Signals	Daniel Broadley^{A}^{A}	Narrative	
"Beggars"	2013	Signals	Love Vis-Art^{A}	Narrative	
"Hello" (ver. 2)	2013	Signals	Daniel Broadley^{A}	Performance	
"Ghost In The Mirror"	2014	Asymmetry	Seymour Milton	Narrative	
"Shout At the Moon"	2014	Asymmetry	Daniel Broadley	Performance	
"When Are We Waking Up?"	2014	Asymmetry	Tim Fox	Performance	
"Getaway"	2015	Asymmetry	Adriano Giotti	Narrative	
"Heart & Desire"	2015	Asymmetry	Alex Taylor	Narrative	
"Black Holes"	2018	Mallory Knox	Zak Pinchin	Performance	
"White Lies"	2019	Mallory Knox	Unknown	Narrative	
"Livewire"	2019	Mallory Knox	Unknown	Narrative	

=== As featured artist ===
Title	Year	Artist	Director	Type	Link
"Speranza"	2013	Tu Amore	Phil Berridge^{A}	Performance	

== Notes ==
- ^A=Are referenced in the video link.
