= Ithaca discography =

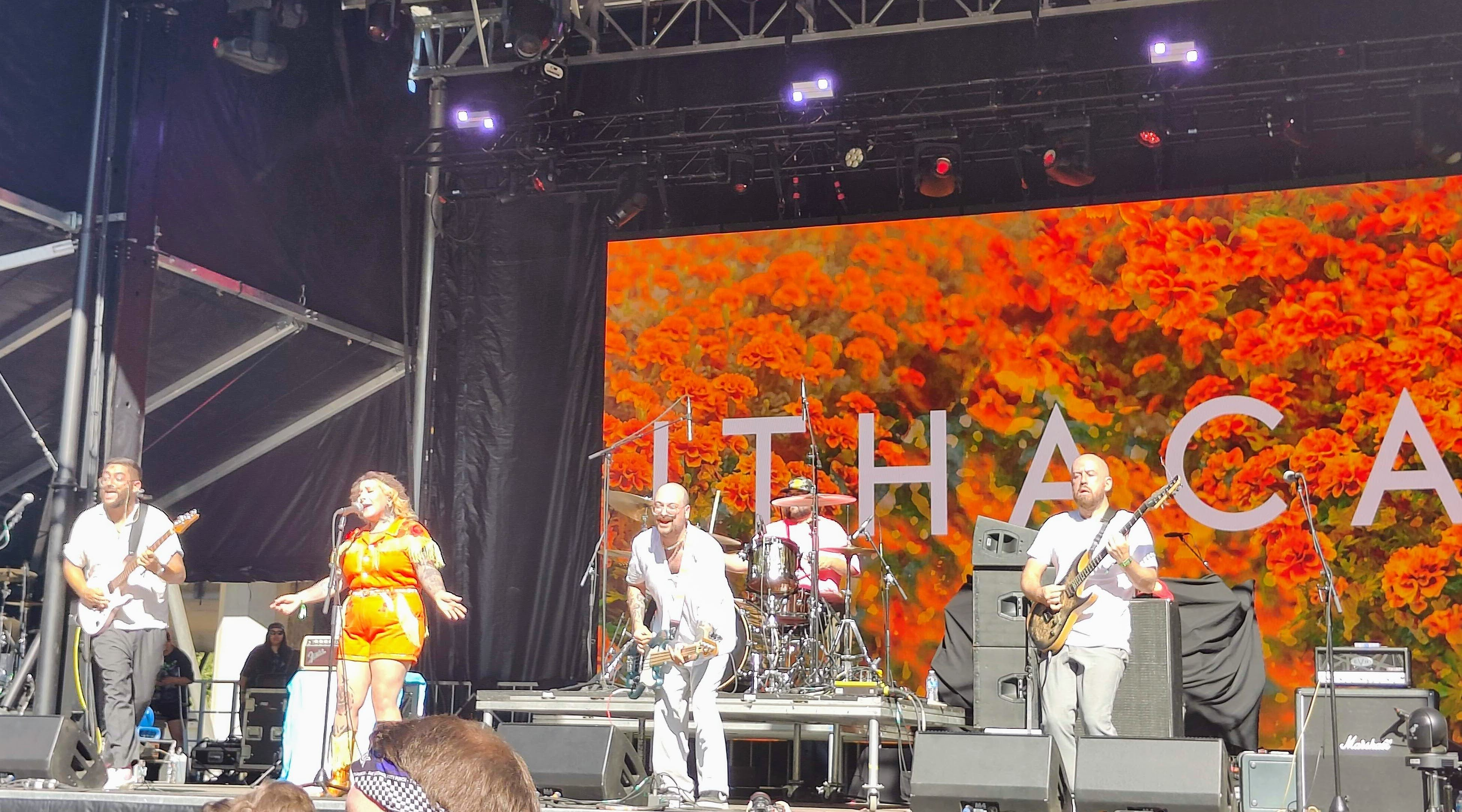
- Ithaca performing at the 2023 Aftershock Festival
- Studio albums: 2
- EPs: 2
- Singles: 10
- Music videos: 7

The British metalcore band Ithaca released two studio albums, two extended plays (EPs), ten singles and seven music videos. The band were formed in London in 2012. Their final lineup consisted of vocalist Djamila Boden Azzouz, guitarists Sam Chetan-Welsh and Will Sweet, bassist Dom Moss and drummer James Lewis. In 2014, Ithaca self-released their debut extended play, Narrow the Way. The following year, the band released their second EP, Trespassers, through Church of Fuck and Soaked in Torment Records. Ithaca recorded their debut album The Language of Injury in 2017. Founding bassist Drew Haycock left the band following its completion. Due to "various reasons", it would not see a release until 2019, through Holy Roar Records.

In September 2020, Ithaca left Holy Roar after the label's founder was accused of sexual misconduct. In October, they released a cover of "Hold Fast Hope" by Thrice for a compilation organised by the 2000trees festival. In May 2021, Ithaca signed to Hassle Records and reissued The Language of Injury through the label. The band's second and final album, They Fear Us (2022), was their first and only album to chart in the United Kingdom, debuting at number 46 on the UK Independent Albums Chart. In 2025, Ithaca released their final single and disbanded after performing at the ArcTanGent festival in August.

== Studio albums ==
List of studio albums, with selected chart positions
Title	Album details	Peak chart positions	
Title	Album details	UK	UK Ind.
The Language of Injury	Released: 1 February 2019; Label: Holy Roar; Format: CD, LP	—	—
They Fear Us	Released: 29 July 2022; Label: Hassle; Format: CD, LP	— (Note: Although They Fear Us did not enter the UK Albums Chart, it reached number 52 on the UK Album Downloads Chart.)	46
"—" denotes a recording that did not chart or was not released in that territory

== Extended plays ==
List of extended plays
Title	EP details
Narrow the Way	Released: 1 March 2014; Label: Self-released; Format: Digital download
Trespassers	Released: 17 July 2015; Label: Church of Fuck, Soaked in Torment; Format: 7" vinyl, digital download

== Singles ==
List of singles, showing associated albums
Title	Year	Album	Ref.
"Narrow the Way"	2014	Narrow the Way	
"The Language of Injury"	2018	The Language of Injury	
"Slow Negative Order"	2018	The Language of Injury	
"Impulse Crush"	2019	The Language of Injury	
"Hold Fast Hope"	2020	Vhiessu - A 2000trees Tribute	
"They Fear Us"	2022	They Fear Us	
"In the Way"	2022	They Fear Us	
"Camera Eats First"	2022	They Fear Us	
"The Future Says Thank You"	2022	They Fear Us	
"Ithaca"	2025	Non-album single	

== Music videos ==
List of music videos, with directors, along with albums
Title	Year	Director(s)	Album	Ref.
"Otherworldly"	2015	Nathan Aspell and Drew Haycock	Trespassers	
"The Language of Injury"	2018	N/A	The Language of Injury	
"Impulse Crush"	2019	Paul Cooke	The Language of Injury	
"Hold Fast Hope"	2020	N/A	Vhiessu - A 2000trees Tribute	
"They Fear Us"	2022	Paul Cooke	They Fear Us	
"Camera Eats First"	2022	Paul Cooke	They Fear Us	
"Fluorescent"	2023	Paul Cooke	They Fear Us	
