= Cutting Our Teeth =

Studio album by We Are the Ocean
- Released: February 1, 2010
- Recorded: Summer 2009 at Salad Days Studio, Baltimore, MD
- Genre: Post-hardcore, alternative rock
- Length: 31:29; 1:14:45 (Deluxe edition)
- Label: Hassle
- Producer: Brian McTernan

We Are the Ocean chronology
| Look Alive (2009) | Cutting Our Teeth (2010) | Go Now and Live (2011) |

Singles from Cutting Our Teeth
- 1. "These Days, I Have Nothing" Released: 1 February 2010; 2. "All of This Has to End" Released: 26 July 2010; 3. "Lucky Ones" Released: 8 September 2010

Professional ratings
Review scores
| Source | Rating |
|---|---|
| Rock Sound | 9/10 stars |
| Sputnikmusic | 5.0/5 |

Cutting Our Teeth is the debut studio album by English post-hardcore band We Are the Ocean, after releasing two EPs. Promotional videos have been made for the songs "These Days, I Have Nothing" and "Look Alive". A video for "All of This Has to End" was recently made and has been highly requested on the Scuzz and Kerrang! music channels. It features noticeably change in Dan Brown's vocal style from the self-titled EP. "Cutting Our Teeth" was re-issued with a bonus disc including 4 previously unreleased songs and 9 previously released songs from the band's two previous EPs.

The deluxe edition CD featured four new songs produced by Jason Wilson at Stakeout Studios, in addition to the previously sold out 2008 mini-album.

Although the title track does not appear on the regular edition of the album, it was released before the album on the Look Alive EP, and was included in the album's deluxe edition bonus disc.

== Track listing ==
Original CD
| No. | Title | Length |
|---|---|---|
| 1. | "Look Alive" | 3:01 |
| 2. | "Our Days Are Numbered" | 2:27 |
| 3. | "All of This Has to End" | 3:24 |
| 4. | "Confessions" | 3:40 |
| 5. | "These Days, I Have Nothing" | 2:54 |
| 6. | "Don't Take Chances" | 2:55 |
| 7. | "(I'll Grab You by the) Neck of the Woods" | 3:53 |
| 8. | "Are You Proud of Me Now?" | 2:34 |
| 9. | "I Could Have Been So Much More" | 2:50 |
| 10. | "This Is Called My Home" | 3:46 |
| Total length: | | 31:29 |

Deluxe edition bonus disc
| No. | Title | Length |
|---|---|---|
| 1. | "Get Out While You Can" | 3:29 |
| 2. | "Lucky Ones" | 3:22 |
| 3. | "Waiting" | 4:13 |
| 4. | "Playing My Heart" | 3:12 |
| 5. | "Cutting Our Teeth" (from Look Alive EP) | 2:03 |
| 6. | "Drag Me Down" (from Look Alive EP) | 2:46 |
| 7. | "Don't Be Careless" (from We Are the Ocean EP) | 3:08 |
| 8. | "Nothing Good Has Happened Yet" (from We Are the Ocean EP) | 3:39 |
| 9. | "Welcome to My Broken Home" (from We Are the Ocean EP) | 2:30 |
| 10. | "Ready for the Fall" (from We Are the Ocean EP) | 4:56 |
| 11. | "(I've Never Felt This) God Damn Good" (from We Are the Ocean EP) | 3:18 |
| 12. | "Days" (from We Are the Ocean EP) | 3:03 |
| 13. | "Save Me! Said the Saviour" (from We Are the Ocean EP) | 3:31 |
| Total length: | | 43:16 |

== Personnel ==
- Dan Brown – unclean vocals
- Liam Cromby – clean vocals, rhythm guitar
- Alfie Scully – lead guitar
- Jack Spence – bass guitar
- Tom Whittaker – drums
