= Maybe Today, Maybe Tomorrow =

Studio album by We Are the Ocean
- Released: 17 September 2012
- Genres: Alternative rock, melodic hardcore, pop punk, alternative metal
- Length: 34:35
- Label: Hassle
- Producer: Pete Miles

We Are the Ocean chronology
Go Now and Live (2011)	Maybe Today, Maybe Tomorrow (2012)	Ark (2015)

Singles from Maybe Today, Maybe Tomorrow
- 1. "Bleed" Released: 5 June 2012; 2. "The Road (Run For Miles)" Released: 13 August 2012; 3. "Young Heart" Released: 2012; 4. "Machine" Released: 17 April 2013; 5. "Chin Up, Son" Released: 5 September 2013

Maybe Today, Maybe Tomorrow is the third full-length album by English rock band We Are the Ocean. It was released on 17 September 2012 through Hassle Records in the United Kingdom and through SideOneDummy the next day, 18 September in the United States. The album is the first from the band without their original lead vocalist Dan Brown, who left the prior to the album's release. The music featured on the album is seen as being a massive jump since the last album, Go Now and Live, marking the beginning of their decline from hardcore, to a more fluid alternative rock sound.

== Background ==
On 5 June 2012 it was announced by the band that during the recording of the third album the band had started to struggle with differing creative opinions. With this announcement Dan Brown, the band's lead vocalist who was known for his screaming role in the band officially left the band saying he would become the band's manager. A day after this announcement Dan Brown himself issued a statement saying: "I have been managing the band for the past two years and I've come to the realisation that, quite frankly, I'm better at managing a band than I am at being in a band, so it's time for me to attack that head first." However, a press release from British publication Rock Sound showed that Dan Brown had actually recorded all of his vocals for the new album and that he was in fact kicked out of the band abruptly. The band also refusing to allow him to join them on their leg on the American Warped Tour, considered by Brown as his dream. The band made their first live performance without Brown at Download Festival on Sunday, June 10 on the Zippo Encore Stage.

== Release and promotion ==
With the announcement of the line up change on 5 June 2012 the band released the first single from the album, "Bleed". The song was uploaded to their YouTube to stream as well as made a free download. BBC Radio 1 DJ Zane Lowe said the song is "Easlily the best thing the band have ever done." The second single "The Road" was streamed exclusively through Revolver magazine's website on 6 August 2012. Two days prior to the single's stream, the band released a video of the making of the music video for "The Road". The song was made Q magazine's "Track of the Day". On 30 August the band debuted a third track, "Golden Gate", as promotion for the album by making it available to stream on YouTube, but was released exclusively through German website Stage Load.

Leading up to the release of the album the band planned a seven-date tour of Germany between 5 and 15 September 2012. As part of the ongoing promotion for the album the band supported Lostprophets on their British tour in November.

"The Road" was featured in the soundtrack for the 2012 revival of Need for Speed: Most Wanted.

== Reception ==
Professional ratings
Aggregate scores
Source	Rating
Metacritic	68/100
Review scores
Source	Rating
Alternative Press	2.5/5 stars
BBC	(Favourable)
NME	(7/10)
Sputnikmusic	4/5 stars
This Is Fake DIY	(7/10)
Thrash Hits	5/6 stars

Upon its release Maybe Today, Maybe Tomorrow received mostly positive reviews from music critics. At Metacritic, which assigns a normalised rating out of 100 to reviews from mainstream critics, the album received an average score of 68, based on 7 reviews, which indicates "generally favorable reviews".

== Track listing ==
All tracks are written by We Are the Ocean and Dan Brown. Lyrics by Dan Brown and Liam Cromby. Except "Pass Me By", lyrics by Alfie Scully.

Original CD
No.	Title	Length
1.	"Stanford Rivers"	1:13
2.	"Bleed"	2:49
3.	"Young Heart"	3:47
4.	"Story of a Modern Child"	3:07
5.	"Machine"	3:39
6.	"The Road"	3:41
7.	"Golden Gate"	5:35
8.	"Maybe Today, Maybe Tomorrow"	3:40
9.	"Pass Me By"	3:42
10.	"Chin Up, Son"	3:22
Total length:		34:35

iTunes bonus track
No.	Title	Length
11.	"One of Those Days"	3:29

== Personnel ==
We Are the Ocean

- Liam Cromby – lead vocals, rhythm guitar
- Alfie Scully – lead guitar, vocals; lead vocals on track 9
- Jack Spence – bass guitar, backing vocals
- Tom Whittaker – drums, percussion, backing vocals

== Release history ==
Country	Date	Label	Format	Source
United Kingdom	17 September 2012	Hassle Records	CD; Vinyl record	
United States	18 September 2012	SideOneDummy	CD; Vinyl record	
