= The Hope List =

Studio album by Lonely the Brave
- Released: 22 January 2021
- Length: 38:28
- Label: Easy Life
- Producer: Jack Bennett

Lonely the Brave chronology
Things Will Matter (2016)	The Hope List (2021)	What We Do to Feel (2023)

The Hope List is the third studio album by English alternative rock band Lonely the Brave. It was released on 22 January 2021, through Easy Life Records.

== Critical reception ==
Professional ratings
Aggregate scores
Source	Rating
AnyDecentMusic?	7.2/10
Metacritic	76/100
Review scores
Source	Rating
Classic Rock	4.5/5 stars
DIY	3.5/5 stars
Gigwise	9/10
Kerrang!	4/5 stars
The Line of Best Fit	7/10
NME	3/5 stars
Upset	4/5 stars

The Hope List was met with "generally favorable" reviews from critics. At Metacritic, which assigns a weighted average rating out of 100 to reviews from mainstream publications, this release received an average score of 76 based on 5 reviews. AnyDecentMusic? gave the release a 7.2 out of 10 based on 6 reviews.

Philip Wilding at Classic Rock said: "LTB's woes have been rewarded with something remarkable: their best record yet." Writing for DIY, Sarah Jamieson explained: "Backed up by powerful guitars and soaring vocals, their brand of intense but atmospheric rock feels rejuvenating."

At Gigwise, Mark McConville said: "The Hope List is an expansive chronicle, spearheading truths and dislodging mediocrity. Every song is monumental and there’s a thread running through them all. The Hope List delivers rage and sorrow in equal measure, and it is a monumental release for the Cambridge band." Writing for The Line of Best Fit, Steven Loftin wrote: "Stepping inside The Hope List feels like setting foot on a wide open field, where clouds mar the sunlight, but a warmth still radiates all around. A gentle wind flurries, blowing all around while the horizon feels endless." Dillan Eastoe from Upset Magazine explained: "Recorded at weekends when day jobs and family life permitted, 'The Hope List' finds the band surging back and sounding invigorated by the hardships they've overcome to get here."

== Tour ==
The band was scheduled for a UK tour in April 2021, but got pushed for October 2021 due to the COVID-19 pandemic.

== Track listing ==
The Hope List track listing
No.	Title	Length
1.	"Bound"	3:36
2.	"Distant Light"	3:40
3.	"Bright Eyes"	2:57
4.	"Chasing Knives"	3:55
5.	"The Hope List"	3:52
6.	"Keeper"	3:34
7.	"(Untitled)"	0:59
8.	"Something I Said"	4:13
9.	"Open Door"	3:48
10.	"Your Heavy Heart"	3:44
11.	"The Harrow"	4:17
Total length:		38:28

== Personnel ==
Lonely the Brave

- Jack Bennett – performance, production, mixing
- Andrew Bushen – performance
- Gavin Edgeley – performance
- Ross Smithwick – performance
- Mark Trotter – performance

Additional contributor

- Robin Schmidt – mastering

== Charts ==
Chart performance for The Hope List
Chart (2021)	Peak position
Scottish Albums (OCC)	21
UK Albums (OCC)	73
UK Independent Albums (OCC)	3
UK Rock & Metal Albums (OCC)	3
