= The Day's War =

Studio album by Lonely the Brave
- Released: 2014
- Genre: Alternative rock
- Label: Hassle, Columbia
- Producer: Mark Williams

Lonely the Brave chronology
Backroads (2013)	The Day's War (2014)	Things Will Matter (2016)

Singles from The Day's War
- 1. "Backroads" Released: 30 June 2014; 2. "Trick of the Light" Released: 2014; 3. "The Blue, The Green" Released: 9 October 2014

Professional ratings
Aggregate scores
Source	Rating
Metacritic	70/100
Review scores
Source	Rating
The Guardian	3/5 stars
NME	8/10

The Day's War is the debut studio album by British alternative rock band Lonely the Brave. It was released in 2014 and reissued with additional tracks – as The Day's War Victory Edition – in 2015 through Hassle Records and Columbia Records.

According to Metacritic, it has received generally favorable reviews from critics.

== Track listing ==
No.	Title	Length
1.	"Intro"	0:51
2.	"Trick of the Light"	3:38
3.	"Backroads"	4:06
4.	"Islands"	2:59
5.	"Dinosaurs"	3:31
6.	"Deserter"	3:18
7.	"Untitled"	1:12
8.	"Kings of the Mountain"	4:20
9.	"Victory Line"	3:54
10.	"Black Saucers"	3:35
11.	"The Blue, The Green"	4:36
12.	"The Day's War"	1:09
13.	"Call of Horses"	5:33
14.	"Outro"	0:39

Victory Edition bonus disc
No.	Title	Length
1.	"Control"	3:29
2.	"Oceana"	2:09
3.	"River, River"	3:32
4.	"Science"	4:23
5.	"Backroads (Redux)"	4:16
6.	"Black Saucers (Redux)"	4:32
7.	"Deserter (Redux)"	4:28
8.	"Islands (Redux)"	3:44
9.	"Trick of the Light" (Live from Angel Studios)	3:38
10.	"Call of Horses" (Live from Angel Studios)	5:29
11.	"Streets of Philadelphia" (Live from Angel Studios)	3:48
12.	"All Is Full of Love" (Live from Angel Studios)	9:22

== Charts ==
Chart (2014)	Peak position
UK Albums (OCC)	14
