= Ark (We Are the Ocean album) =

2015 studio album by We Are the Ocean

ARK

Studio album by We Are the Ocean
- Released: 11 May 2015
- Recorded: 2014
- Genre: Alternative rock, hard rock
- Length: 44:02
- Label: Hassle
- Producer: Peter Miles

We Are the Ocean chronology
Maybe Today, Maybe Tomorrow (2012)	ARK (2015)

Singles from ARK
- 1. "ARK" Released: 7 October 2014; 2. "Do It Together" Released: 18 February 2015; 3. "Holy Fire" Released: 16 April 2015; 4. "Good For You" Released: 2015

ARK is the fourth and final studio album by English rock band We Are The Ocean. It was released on 11 May 2015 in the United Kingdom. The album spawned three singles: "Ark", "Do It Together", and "Holy Fire".

== Background ==
Recorded in the summer of 2014, the band got new management on board, after the release of their last studio album, Maybe Today, Maybe Tomorrow, released in 2012. This is the first album to be written solely by the new line up, without any help from previous vocalist Dan Brown, who put work into their last release. This album marks the full departure from their original post-hardcore and pop punk sound, in favour of a more indie rock tone.

== Track listing ==
All tracks are written by We Are the Ocean. Lyrics by Liam Cromby

Original CD
No.	Title	Length
1.	"ARK"	4:13
2.	"I Wanna Be"	2:38
3.	"Good For You"	4:27
4.	"Do It Together"	3:12
5.	"Shere Khan"	3:45
6.	"Hope You're Well"	3:46
7.	"Letter To Michael"	2:23
8.	"Holy Fire"	4:40
9.	"Wild"	3:20
10.	"There's Nothing Wrong"	3:31
11.	"The Midnight Law"	3:08
12.	"Remember To Remember Them"	4:49
Total length:		44:02

iTunes bonus track
No.	Title	Length
13.	"The Great Unknown"	3:16
Total length:		47:18

== Reception ==
ARK received mixed to positive reviews from critics. drownedinsound.com gave it an 8/10 praising non-stop rock n' roll flow, quoting "Each [track] is chock full of energy, watertight and detailed rhythm section work, and pummeling into a state of death by melody and counter-melody."

Bring The Noise also gave the album a strong 8/10 review, they said "With one swift move, We Are The Ocean had evolved from a gritty post-hardcore outfit to a tightly wound alternative rock group that are capable of punching out a twelve song album that is the physical embodiment of everything that is good about modern alternative rock."

Alreadyheard.com gave a more mixed review saying the album is powerful but they aren't sure who on We Are The Ocean's new sound, saying "At times 'Ark’ is modern and at others classy, but it's also raw and polished. Sure variation is a good thing to have but once you're finished with 'Ark’, you're left confused as to who or what We Are The Ocean are now."

Mosh gave it a far more negative 2.5/5 stars quoting inconsistency in the album's sound.

== Personnel ==
- Liam Cromby – lead vocals, rhythm guitar
- Alfie Scully – lead guitar, vocals
- Jack Spence – bass guitar, backing vocals
- Tom Whittaker – drums, percussion, backing vocals
