= Go Now and Live =

Album by We Are the Ocean

Studio album by We Are the Ocean
- Released: 25 April 2011
- Recorded: 6 December 2010–7 January 2011
- Genre: Post-hardcore, alternative rock, melodic hardcore, pop punk, alternative metal
- Length: 33:19
- Label: Hassle
- Producer: Pete Miles

We Are the Ocean chronology
Cutting Our Teeth (2010)	Go Now and Live (2011)	Maybe Today, Maybe Tomorrow (2012)

Singles from Go Now And Live
- 1. "What It Feels Like" Released: 9 February 2011; 2. "The Waiting Room" Released: 21 March 2011; 3. "Runaway" Released: 21 June 2011; 4. "Overtime Is A Crime" Released: 3 October 2011

Go Now and Live is the second full-length studio album by English post-hardcore band We Are the Ocean, released on 25 April 2011. The album was produced by Pete Miles (The King Blues, Canterbury) and released through Hassle Records.

The release again saw a slight change in the band's sound, with unclean vocalist Dan Brown providing additional clean vocals. This was also the last studio alum to feature Brown, departing the band in 2012.

Two singles were released prior to the release of the album: "What It Feels Like" on 4 January 2011, and "The Waiting Room" on 18 April 2011. The music video for "What It Feels Like" premiered on 8 February 2011, while the music video for "The Waiting Room" premiered on 21 March 2011. Runaway was the third single to be released.

== Reception ==
Professional ratings
Aggregate scores
Source	Rating
Metacritic	59/100
Review scores
Source	Rating
Blare Magazine	3.5/5 stars
AllMusic	3.5/5 stars
BBC Music	(favourable)
Sputnikmusic	3/5 stars
Rock Sound	9/10 stars

Go Now and Live has received mixed to positive reviews from music critics upon its release. At Metacritic, which assigns a normalized rating out of 100 to reviews from mainstream critics, the album received an average score of 59, based on 5 reviews, which indicates "mixed or average reviews".

== Track listing ==
Original CD
No.	Title	Length
1.	"Trouble Is Temporary, Time Is Tonic"	2:44
2.	"What It Feels Like"	3:02
3.	"The Waiting Room"	3:34
4.	"Run Away"	3:45
5.	"Trials and Tribulations"	3:19
6.	"Overtime is a Crime"	3:09
7.	"Godspeed"	2:53
8.	"Now and Then"	3:59
9.	"Follow What You Need"	3:15
10.	"Before I Die"	3:39

iTunes bonus track
No.	Title	Length
11.	"Distances"	3:16

Deluxe edition bonus disc: Live and Unplugged at Shepherds Bush Empire
No.	Title	Length
1.	"What It Feels Like" (Acoustic)	3:57
2.	"These Days, I Have Nothing" (Acoustic)	3:37
3.	"Playing My Heart" (Acoustic)	3:50
4.	"Run Away" (Acoustic)	4:14
5.	"Trials and Tribulations" (Acoustic)	3:34
6.	"This Is Called My Home" (Acoustic)	4:41
7.	"Overtime Is a Crime" (Acoustic)	3:51
8.	"Now and Then" (Acoustic)	4:37
9.	"Confessions" (Acoustic)	4:58
10.	"Nothing Good Has Happened Yet" (Acoustic)	5:34
11.	"The Waiting Room" (Acoustic)	5:00

== Charts ==
Chart	Position
UK Album Chart	45
UK Rock Album Chart	3
UK Album Download Chart	40
UK Independent Album Chart	5

== Personnel ==
We Are The Ocean

- Dan Brown – vocals
- Liam Cromby – vocals, rhythm guitar
- Alfie Scully – lead guitar
- Jack Spence – bass guitar
- Tom Whittaker – drums, percussion

Additional personnel

- Pete Miles - producer
