= Things Will Matter =

Studio album by Lonely the Brave
- Released: 20 May 2016
- Recorded: September–December 2015
- Genre: Alternative rock
- Label: Hassle, RCA

Lonely the Brave chronology
The Day's War (2014)	Things Will Matter (2016)	Diamond Days (2017)

Singles from Things Will Matter
- 1. "Black Mire" Released: 31 January 2016

Things Will Matter is the second studio album by English alternative rock band, Lonely the Brave. The album was released through Hassle Records and distributed through RCA Records on 20 May 2016.

== Background ==
Lonely the Brave first announced the album in February 2016, about three months prior to its release. The album was recorded in late 2015.

== Musical style, writing, composition ==
The band described the album as "doing something different with most bands", as far as band collaboration was concerned. The described themselves as minimally stressed while putting together the album.

== Touring ==
Lonely the Brave embarked on a two legged tour in late 2016 and early 2017 with Tall Ships in 2016 and Mallory Knox in 2017 to promote the album.

== Critical reception ==
Things Will Matter
Aggregate scores
Source	Rating
Metacritic	81/100
Review scores
Source	Rating
The 405	7/10
Drowned in Sound	7/10
Kerrang!	4/5 stars
Q	
Rock Sound	8/10

Things Will Matter has received critical acclaim. According to Metacritic, the album has an average score of 81, based on five reviews. The consensus of critics was that the album contained epic themes, and powerful instrumentation. David McLaughlin of Rock Sound gave the album four out of five stars commenting that Lonely the Brave "pulled another rabbit from the hat." In a positive review, the Kerrang! staff described the album "continues to make bold strides into the unknown." The staff also gave the album four stars out of five.

== Track listing ==
No.	Title	Length
1.	"Wait in the Car"	3:41
2.	"Black Mire"	4:12
3.	"What If You Fall In"	5:15
4.	"Rattlesnakes"	3:28
5.	"Diamond Days"	3:48
6.	"Play Dead"	4:49
7.	"Dust & Bones"	3:34
8.	"Radar"	2:54
9.	"Tank Wave"	4:20
10.	"Strange Like I"	3:04
11.	"Boxes"	3:16
12.	"Jaws of Hell"	7:43

== Charts ==
Chart (2016)	Peak position
UK Albums (OCC)	35
