= Mallory Knox =

English alternative rock band

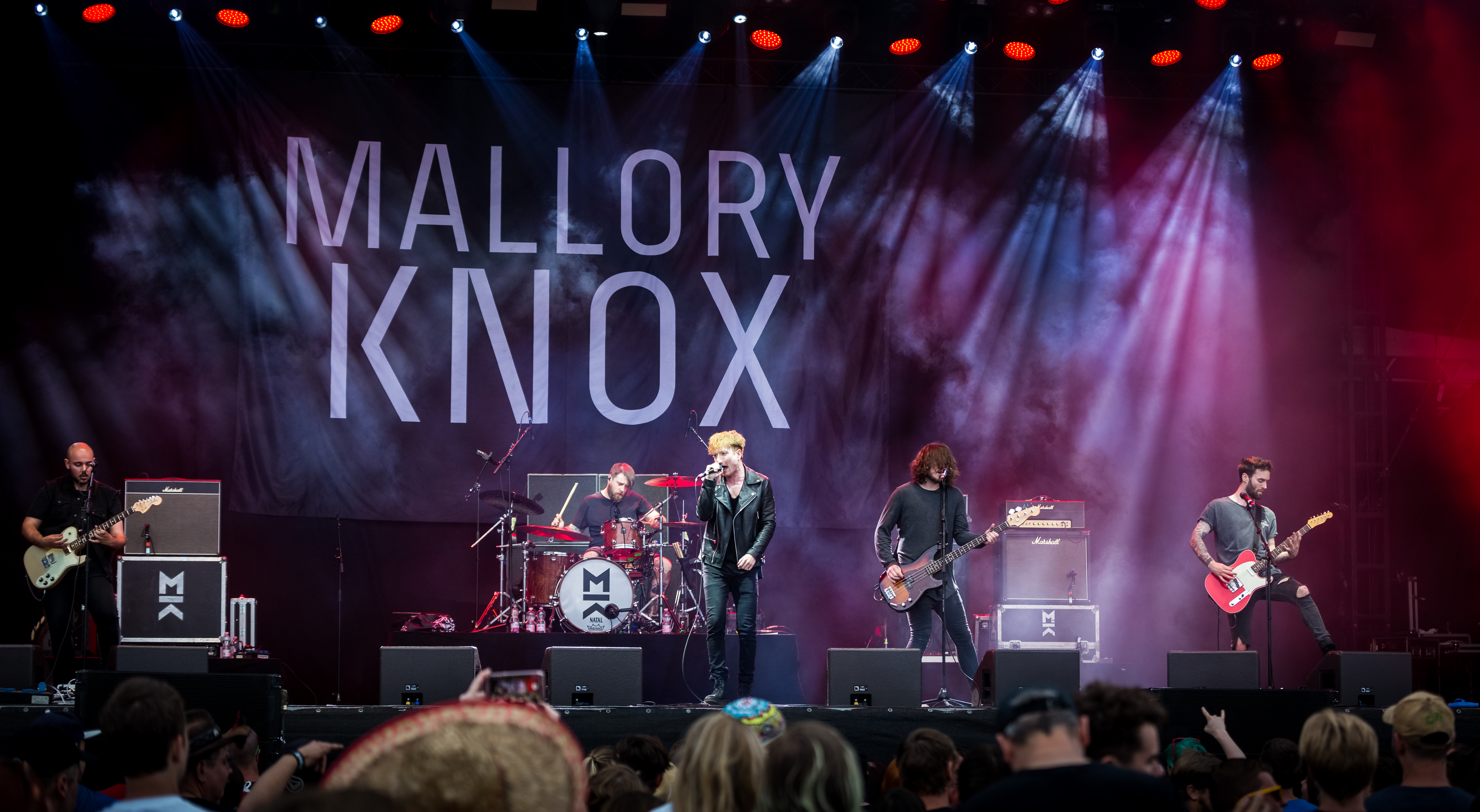
- Mallory Knox performing at Rock am Ring 2017.

Background information
- Origin: Cambridge, Cambridgeshire, England, United Kingdom
- Genres: Alternative rock, post-hardcore
- Years active: 2009–2019, 2024-
- Labels: A Wolf at Your Door, Search & Destroy, Epic, RCA
- Members: Mikey Chapman; James Gillett; Dave Rawling
- Past members: Sam Douglas; Joe Savins
- Website: www.malloryknox.com

Mallory Knox are an English alternative rock band from Cambridge. In 2013, they released their debut album, Signals, which reached #33 in the UK album charts. Their second album, Asymmetry, was released on 27 October 2014 and reached #16 on UK Album Chart. They later released their third album, Wired, on 10 March 2017. Their fourth record, Mallory Knox, was released on 16 August 2019, after which they announced a farewell tour.

On 24 December 2023, Slam Dunk announced that Mallory Knox would return for an exclusive set at their 2024 North and South festival dates, with all five original members returning.

== History ==
=== 2009–2012: Formation, early releases and signing with A Wolf at Your Door Records ===
The band was formed in August 2009 by lead guitarist Joe Savins and drummer Dave Rawling, who were joined by vocalist Mikey Chapman, bassist Sam Douglas and rhythm guitarist James Gillett, completing the band's lineup. All members had previously been in different local bands. The band has stated their name originates from a character from the film Natural Born Killers, saying "We wanted a character name, preferably someone with a dark edge and dark side and we were going to go for Dorian Gray but at the time there was a cheesy Hollywood movie coming out of Dorian Gray so we went for Mallory because of that.".

After approximately 3 months of songwriting, the band started to play local shows in Cambridge around November 2009. They went on to record their debut EP Pilot at Studio Glasseye with the help of producer Dan Lancaster (We Are The Ocean, Lower Than Atlantis). The band was signed to A Wolf At Your Door Records and released the EP as a free download on 4 July 2011.

The band later played across the UK on their first tour with Never Means Maybe, as well as being endorsed by Rockstar energy drink. The release of their first music video "Oceans" peaked as high as number 2 in the most requested Scuzz chart. A number of tours were then announced for the first quarter of 2012.

=== 2012–2014: Signals ===
The band played at Download Festival in June 2012, then through November and December, the band supported rock band Canterbury in the UK. Throughout 2012 the band released a series of singles through a A Wolf At Your Door (including "Death Rattle", "Wake Up", "Lighthouse", "Beggars" and "Hello") and on 21 January 2013, the band released their first album, Signals. It reached No. 33 in the UK album charts. Mallory Knox on went to support Don Broco on their Priorities Tour from February 2013 to early April. The band later went on a UK headline tour in April to promote their debut album.

During the Kerrang! Awards 2013, Mallory Knox where nominated for Best British Newcomer but lost to Lower Than Atlantis. The band played at Slam Dunk Festival in May 2013. They then played on the opening stage at the Reading and Leeds Festivals in August. On 7 October 2013, a deluxe version of Signals was released, featuring five extra tracks. Mallory Knox also supported Biffy Clyro on 28 October in Guildford as part of the Samsung Galaxy Studio live shows.

Starting on 9 November 2013, the band embarked on a headline tour across Britain, supported by the bands Blitz Kids and Crooks. In December the same year, it was announced that the band will be touring with post-hardcore band A Day to Remember, along the likes of Every Time I Die and The Story So Far in the UK in February 2014.

=== 2014–2016: Asymmetry ===
In an issue of Rocksound magazine, the band stated that they had written 16 songs, but are going to commit to 10 or 11 of them to their new album and also stated that the album could be released as early as spring in the same year. In April the band performed at Slam Dunk Festival, and would later perform at 2014's Reading and Leeds Festival in August. On 30 June 2014, details of the band's second studio album, Asymmetry, were released. The track list, initial release date of 13 October 2014 and preorder details were revealed, ahead of its first track "QOD II" which was revealed on BBC Radio 1 a few days later. The expected release date was later changed to 27 October. In November, the band toured the UK in support of the new album, culminating in two sold out nights at London's Electric Ballroom.

Early in 2015, the band toured America for the first time, supporting Pierce The Veil and Sleeping With Sirens on the second leg of the World Tour. The five-piece returned to the UK in March to headline the 2015 edition of Takedown Festival at Southampton University. In May, they announced that their second album, Asymmetry, would become available in the United States in June. Mallory Knox played the In New Music We Trust Stage at BBC Radio 1's Big Weekend on 23 May.

During the summer of 2015, Mallory Knox played every date of the Vans Warped Tour, and announced a homecoming UK headline tour for September with support from Set It Off and The Xcerts, including the band's biggest ever headline show at London's Roundhouse. On 20 January 2016, Mallory Knox were announced for Slam Dunk Festival.

=== 2016–2018: Wired ===
At the beginning of 2016, Mallory Knox started recording a new album.

On 2 November 2016, the band revealed details of the new record, Wired. On the same day, they premiered "Giving It Up", the first single, and on 9 November, a music video for the song was released.

On 13 January 2017, "Lucky Me" was announced as second single, followed by "Better Off Without You" on 20 January.

Wired was released on 10 March 2017 through RCA Records. Shortly after, the band started a headline UK tour with Lonely the Brave and Fatherson.

On 12 May 2017, Mallory Knox released a cover of Coldplay’s song, "Yellow", in collaboration with mental health charity CALM (Campaign Against Living Miserably). The track is part of the campaign Torch Songs, that aims to celebrate music as powerful tool in the fight for mental health.

On 5 August 2017, the band premiered a new single, "Sugar", ahead of their appearances at Reading and Leeds Festivals.

=== 2018–2019: Mallory Knox and farewell tour ===
On 14 February 2018, lead vocalist Mikey Chapman left the group and has since started a new band called Black Sky Research. The remaining members of Mallory Knox released a statement announcing that bassist Sam Douglas, after singing co-lead with Chapman, would take on sole lead vocal duties.

On 19 February 2018, Mallory Knox premiered a new song, "Black Holes", and revealed that they started working on a new record.

On 15 May 2019, they announced the release of a self-titled album, and premiered a new single, "White Lies". On 10 June, the band released a second single, "Guts", followed by the song "Livewire" on 15 July. A fifth single, "Wherever", was announced on 12 August.

The new record, Mallory Knox, was released on 16 August 2019, through A Wolf At Your Door Records. On the same day, the band began a headline tour across the UK.

On 9 September 2019, the band released a statement, in which they confirmed that they will be breaking up after finishing their forthcoming headline UK tour.

=== 2023–present: Reunion ===
On 24 December 2023, Slam Dunk announced an exclusive Mallory Knox reunion set at their respective 2024 Slam Dunk North and South festivals, including the return of original vocalist Mikey Chapman for the first time since his departure in 2018. They have since announced the 'Asymmetry Anniversary UK tour' taking place 13–20 October 2024. They released “Afterglow”, their first single in 9 years, in 2026. This is also their first single with Mikey Chapman back on lead vocals, ever since Sam Douglas’ departure.

== Members ==
- Mikey Chapman – lead vocals (2009–2018, 2024–present)
- Sam Douglas – bass guitar (2009–2019, 2024–2026), co-lead vocals (2009–2018, 2024–2026), lead vocals (2018–2019)
- James Gillett – rhythm guitar, backing vocals (2009–2019, 2024–present)
- Joe Savins – lead guitar, backing vocals (2009–2019, 2024–2026)
- Dave Rawling – drums (2009–2019, 2024–present)

== Discography ==
Studio albums

- Signals (2013)
- Asymmetry (2014)
- Wired (2017)
- Mallory Knox (2019)
