= Ithaca (band) =

British metalcore band

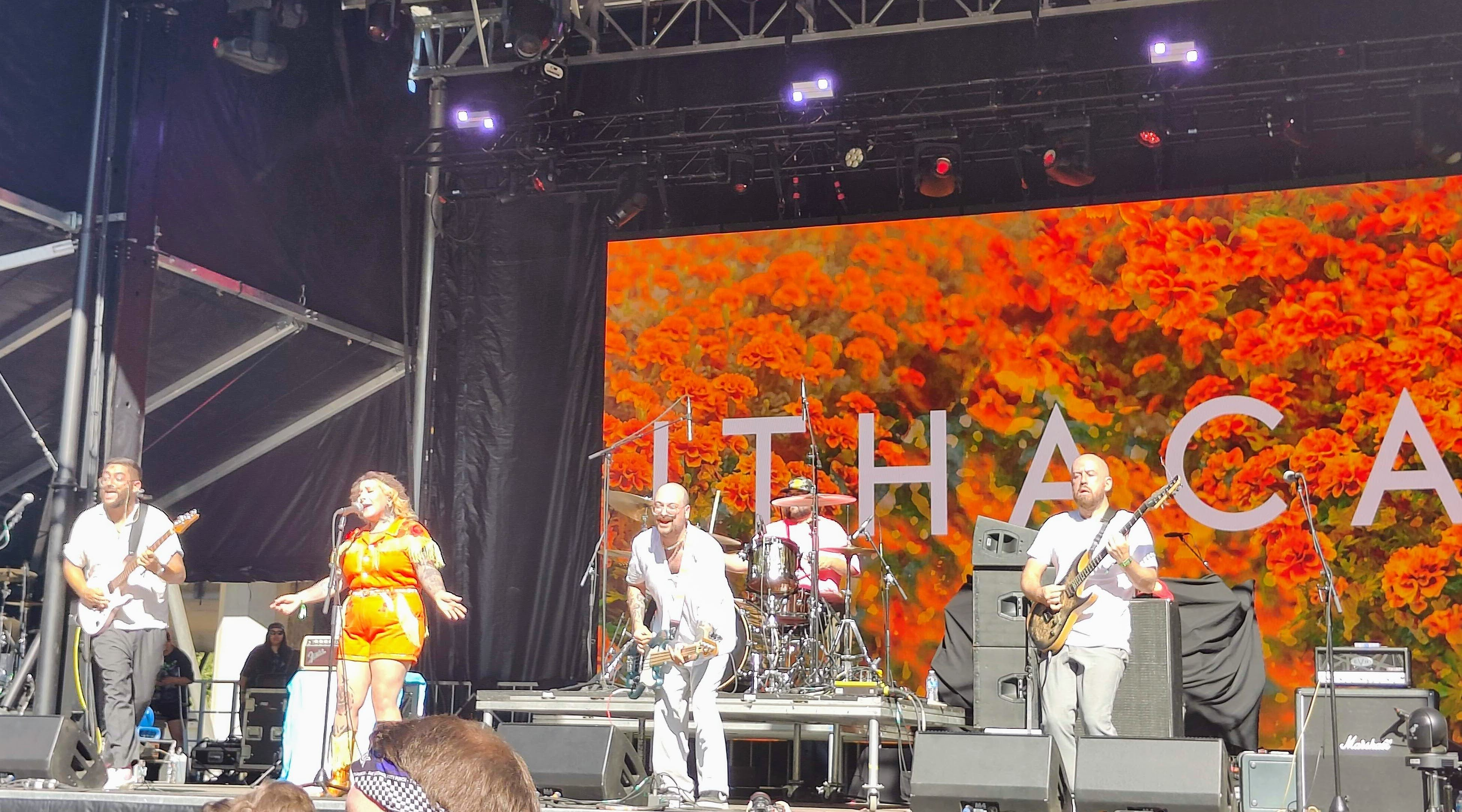
- Ithaca performing at the 2023 Aftershock Festival

Background information
- Origin: London, United Kingdom
- Genres: Metalcore; post-hardcore
- Works: Ithaca discography
- Years active: 2012–2025
- Labels: Church of Fuck; Soaked in Torment; Holy Roar; Hassle
- Spinoffs: Moksha
- Past members: Djamila Boden Azzouz; Sam Chetan-Welsh; Will Sweet; Dom Moss; James Lewis; Drew Haycock; Red Sismey
- Website: theyfearus.com

Ithaca were a British metalcore band, formed in London in 2012. Their final lineup consisted of vocalist Djamila Boden Azzouz, guitarists Sam Chetan-Welsh and Will Sweet, bassist Dom Moss and drummer James Lewis; bassists Drew Haycock and Red Sismey are former members of the band. Emerging from the London hardcore scene, Ithaca were known their diverse and emotionally charged and intense musical style. Outside of their music, Ithaca were known for their focus on social issues, emphasizing values such as community and diversity.

Following the release of two extended plays, Ithaca recorded its debut album The Language of Injury in 2017, amidst a period of turmoil. Due to "various reasons", it would not see a release until February 2019, through Holy Roar Records. In 2020, the band left Holy Roar after the label's founder was accused of sexual misconduct and signed to Hassle Records the following year. The band's second and final album, They Fear Us (2022), received critical acclaim, earning the band nominations for "Best Production" and "Best Single" (for its title track) at the Heavy Music Awards 2023. In October 2024, the band announced their plans to disband and release one final single; their final performance took place at the ArcTanGent Festival in August 2025.

== History ==
=== 2012–2015: Formation and EPs ===
Ithaca were formed in London in late 2012 by guitarists Sam Chetan-Welsh and Will Sweet and drummer James Lewis, whom had known each other since school. Vocalist Djmala Boden Azzouz, whom had recently moved to London after dropping out of a degree doing musical theatre at the University of Leeds, joined the band after she responded to an advertisement posted by Chetan-Welsh on the website Join My Band. At Ithaca's first rehearsal in December 2012, she impressed the band by improvising Limp Bizkit's "Break Stuff" over a song the rest of the band had written. The band performed their first show as part of an all-day event at the New Cross Inn in London.

In 2014, Ithaca released its debut extended play (EP) Narrow the Way, and contributed to the Church of Fuck compilation album False Metal Eternal. The following year, they released their second EP, Trespassers. The band spent their early years playing shows with a mixture of grindcore, death metal, black metal and hardcore bands—something which Azzouz attributed to their lack of identity at the time—and also embarked on tours with Employed to Serve and Venom Prison. At the same time, Ithaca were frequently subject to bigotry and negativity from promoters, audiences and bands they played with. In a 2023 interview with Kerrang!, Azzouz stated that she felt the need to be "hyper-aggressive" at their shows in order to prove herself to audiences during this period: "A lot of that anger was directed at [them]. [...] A lot of the people in those audiences weren’t very nice to me, for years, so I felt like I had to push back."

=== 2016–2020: The Language of Injury ===
Ithaca began working on its debut album, The Language of Injury, in 2016. In July, the band took a break from writing to embark on a short UK tour. In April 2017, the band recorded the album in five to six days with producer Joe Clayton at Nø Studio in Manchester. Azzouz stated that the album was "written and recorded during a time of immense pain and suffering" for its members. She wrote its lyrics amidst the collapse of a toxic relationship. During recording, Chetan-Welsh struggled with the grief of his mother's death, which occurred shortly beforehand. "That album was an immediate emotional reaction to some deep pain that we were feeling", he told Kerrang! in 2022: "It felt like throwing up, basically." Following its completion, bassist Drew Haycock was replaced by Red Sismey. In August 2017, the band toured the United Kingdom with Let It Die. Owing to "various reasons", the album would not see a release for almost two years; "it came out much later that we wanted", Chetan-Welsh said.

The Language of Injury was released on 1 February 2019 through Holy Roar Records. The band had wanted to release the Trespassers EP through the label, but were unable to due to timing issues, according to Azzouz. The album received critical praise, and was listed as one of the year's best albums by Kerrang!, Metal Hammer and Revolver. Following the album's release, the band performed a mixture of headlining and supporting shows across the United Kingdom in March and April 2019, followed by a co-headlining tour with Leeched between 28 May and 2 June. In August, the band performed at the ArcTanGent festival. In November, they toured the UK again supporting Jamie Lenman. Between February and March 2020, Ithaca toured Europe supporting Big Thief.

In September 2020, Alex Fitzpatrick, the founder of Holy Roar, was accused of sexual misconduct. Ithaca were one of the first bands on the label to respond publicly to the allegations, and they—along with the rest of the label's staff and roster—severed ties in response. The following month, Ithaca released a cover of Thrice's "Hold Fast Hope" as part of a compilation covering the latter band's fourth album Vhiessu (2005), organized by the 2000trees festival. All proceeds from the single's sales were donated to Rape Crisis England & Wales.

=== 2021–2024: They Fear Us ===
In May 2021, Ithaca signed with Hassle Records and reissued The Language of Injury through the label. In January 2022, the band began teasing their second album, They Fear Us. Due to the COVID-19 pandemic, the band collaborated on the album's material online, before spending a month at The Ranch Production House recording the album with producer Lewis Johns. The album was released on 29 July 2022 to critical acclaim, and was one of the year's "most lauded [metal] albums", according to The Guardian's Matt Mills. Kerrang! and Metal Hammer ranked it as the second and third best album of 2022, with the latter selecting it as the year's best metalcore album. In addition, the album and its title track received respective nominations for "Best Production" and "Best Single" at the Heavy Music Awards 2023.

Following the cancellation of a European tour supporting MØL in February 2022, Ithaca were due to perform at that year's 2000trees festival, but dropped out due to Azouzz's visa issues following her move to Berlin with her husband. In August 2022, Ithaca embarked on a short headlining tour of the United Kingdom; they were supported by Pupil Slicer on all but two dates. After performing at the ArcTanGent festival, the band embarked on a tour of Europe with Respire. In March 2023, Ithaca, Get the Shot and Thrown embarked on the Merciless Destruction Tour of Europe. The planned first show of the tour, which was due to take place at Die Stadtmitte in Karlsruhe, Germany on 10 March, was cancelled due to a hostage situation at a nearby pharmacy. In July 2023, Ithaca performed on the main stage of 2000trees. Between 23 September and 7 October 2023, the band embarked on its first and only tour of the United States, the Y'All Fear Us Tour, which included dates performing at the Louder Than Life and Aftershock festivals. On 25 November 2023, Ithaca held a special performance at The Dome in London, billed "A Very Special Evening with Ithaca", performing They Fear Us in its entirety. The band were due to perform at Download Festival in June 2024, but withdrew as part of a boycott against the festival's association with Barclays and their ties to Israel.

=== 2025: Disbandment ===
There's been no falling out or creative differences, in fact we're closer than ever, we're just no longer able to balance our life responsibilities with giving you the standard of art that you deserve, and feel like we've fulfilled more than our wildest dreams could have imagined in terms of where this band would take us.

— Ithaca on their disbandment, 2024

On 30 October 2024, Ithaca announced they would be disbanding in 2025, after performing a final show, "The Cremation Party", at the O2 Academy Islington on 8 February. In addition to the concert, the band announced plans to release one final single. In a 2025 interview with Metal Hammer, Azzouz said that Ithaca could not afford to invest more time into making a new record and "reach the next step up". In an interview with Stereoboard, she also stated that there "was a huge risk [Ithaca] would create something not up to par" if they forced themselves to make another album, and said that their disbandment was not "about taking something away from people, it’s about stopping something shitty happening".

Ithaca were supported by Forlorn and Knife Bride at "The Cremation Party". During the concert, the band reunited with Haycock for a performance of "Ashes" and debuted their new song live. On 13 February, the band announced they would be playing one more final show on 15 August at the ArcTanGent Festival. On 20 May 2025, Ithaca released their final single, "Ithaca". In 2026, Chetan-Welsh launched a new project, Moksha, which made its live festival debut at ArcTanGent in August of that year.

== Musical style and influences ==
Ithaca have been described as a metalcore, metallic hardcore, and post-hardcore band. Their debut album, The Language of Injury, featured melodic hardcore and screamo elements, alongside influences from post-metal, noise rock, doom metal, crust punk and black metal. On They Fear Us, Ithaca expanded beyond their previous album's hardcore style into a sound one critic described as "far beyond a genre designation", with influences from blackgaze, industrial metal, mathcore, power pop, new wave, shoegaze, djent, disco, gospel, jazz, 70's prog music and 90's R&B.

Ithaca's influences included the Dillinger Escape Plan, Meshuggah, the Chariot, Rolo Tomassi, Rivers of Nihil, Every Time I Die, and the Ghost of a Thousand. Chetan-Welsh cited Lamb of God, Killswitch Engage, Led Zeppelin and Pink Floyd as additional influences; he also credited his father with introducing him to Lauryn Hill, Django Reinhardt, and classical music. Azzouz cited riot grrrl, Kittie and Jack Off Jill as formative influences. The aesthetics of They Fear Us were informed by its members' Arab and Indian cultural heritages, alongside camp, "70s retro" art, and queer art and fashion.

In addition to their music, Ithaca were known for their focus on social issues, emphasizing values such as community and diversity. In a 2019 interview with V13 Media, Azzouz stated that the band were advocates against tolerance of sexism, racism, homophobia, transphobia, sexual assault and abuse, and "shitty people doing shitty things that ruin it for everyone else". In a 2023 interview with Metal Hammer, Azzouz stated that Ithaca had faced "a lot of pushback" for their views, and she had been the target of doxxing and online harassment. In the band's early days, Ithaca were subject to death threats from Nazis after Azzouz wore a t-shirt stating "Stop supporting racist bands" at one of their shows.

== Band members ==
Final lineup

- Djamila Boden Azzouz – lead vocals (2012–2025)
- Sam Chetan-Welsh – guitar (2012–2025)
- Will Sweet – guitar (2012–2025)
- Dom Moss – bass guitar (2020–2025)
- James Lewis – drums (2012–2025)

Past members

- Drew Haycock – bass guitar (2013–2017, 2025)
- Red Sismey – bass guitar (2017–2020)

Timeline

== Awards and nominations ==
Heavy Music Awards
| Year | Nominee / work | Award | Result | Ref. |
|---|---|---|---|---|
| 2020 | Themselves | Best UK Breakthrough Band | Nominated | |
| 2023 | They Fear Us | Best Production | Nominated | |
| 2023 | "They Fear Us" | Best Single | Nominated | |

== Discography ==
Studio albums

- The Language of Injury (2019)
- They Fear Us (2022)
