= The Language of Injury =

2019 debut studio album by Ithaca

Studio album by Ithaca
- Released: 1 February 2019
- Recorded: May 2017
- Studio: Nø (Manchester)
- Genres: Metalcore; mathcore; melodic hardcore; post-hardcore; post-metal; screamo
- Length: 30:59
- Label: Holy Roar

Ithaca chronology
Trespassers (2015)	The Language of Injury (2019)	They Fear Us (2022)

Singles from The Language of Injury
- 1. "The Language of Injury" Released: 29 October 2018; 2. "Slow Negative Order" Released: 1 December 2018; 3. "Impulse Crush" Released: 14 January 2019

The Language of Injury is the debut studio album by the British metalcore band Ithaca, released on 1 February 2019. The band began working on the album in 2016 and recorded it with Joe Clayton at Nø Studio in Manchester in May 2017, amidst a period of personal turmoil for its members. It is a metalcore, mathcore, melodic hardcore, post-hardcore, post-metal, and screamo album whose songs are thematically based around communication or lack thereof.

After almost two years of delays, The Language of Injury was released through Holy Roar Records to critical praise. It was listed as one of the best albums of 2019 by Kerrang!, Metal Hammer and Revolver. To promote the album, Ithaca toured the United Kingdom and Europe as both a headliner and supporting act and performed at the 2019 edition of the ArcTanGent festival.

== Background and recording ==
Ithaca began working on The Language of Injury in 2016. "New Covenant" was the first song written for the album. According to vocalist Djamila Boden Azzouz, the band wrote and recorded the album "during a time of immense pain and suffering", particularly for her and guitarist Sam Chetan-Welsh. "Basically everything that could go wrong, went wrong [...] All that really big transitional life stuff chose to happen in that space of time", she told Kerrang! in 2019. Azzouz wrote most of the album's lyrics whilst staying in a village outside of Brighton, at the end of a toxic relationship. In an interview with Astral Noize, Azzouz said that she hoped to self reflect whilst staying there, but instead suffered a mental breakdown and was eventually picked up and driven back to London by a friend. Personal issues, alongside the band's perfectionism, protracted their writing process.

Ithaca recorded The Language of Injury in the span of nine days with Joe Clayton at Nø Studio in Manchester in May 2017. Chetan-Welsh's mother died a month before recording commenced, following a year-long battle with a brain tumour; he subsequently "[tried] to use [recording] as a focus point" to get through his grief. Following its completion, Ithaca delayed the album due to their personal struggles, and bassist Drew Haycock was replaced by Red Sismey.

== Composition and lyrics ==
The Language of Injury has been described as metalcore, mathcore, melodic hardcore, post-hardcore, post-metal, and screamo. Critics also highlighted elements from noise rock, doom metal, crust punk and black metal. Eli Enis of Kerrang! described the album as both hardcore-identified yet "vast and genreless". It displays a dissonant, suspenseful sound, employing technical guitar riffs and breakdowns. According to Zoe Camp of Bandcamp Daily, it features "winding, amorphous arrangements" that quickly change between "blissful, shoegaze-y respite" and "hell". Kim Kelly of Pitchfork found the album both dynamic and unpredictable and viewed its "soft-to-loud, pretty-to-harsh" setups—seen notably on "Gilt" and "Better Abuse"—typical of "melodic metalcore". The album's title track features progressive metal time signature changes, whilst "Secretspace" and "Gilt" place "shimmering post-rock chords atop muscular, syncopated grooves". Camp compared the "blackened, proggy post-metal" of "Clsr." and "Slow Negative Order" to Deafheaven and the Ocean. Azzouz uses screamed vocals and clean singing; vocal harmonies also appear throughout the album's tracks.

Thematically, the album is based around communication or lack thereof. Although she and Ithaca did not go into writing with a particular concept in mind, Azzouz felt that the album represented a "snapshot" of her life and the emotions she was feeling at the time. "New Covenant" is "letting go of the past and starting again". "Impulse Crush" is about realising "you wasted years trying to help someone who doesn't want to help themselves, and that they've damaged you in the process". "Secretspace" is about Azzouz looking back at her own memories she cherishes, stating that she realised they were "ultimately a lie". "Slow Negative Order" is about "rebirth and revenge". Inspired by the collaborative Cult of Luna and Julie Christmas album Mariner (2016) and Kate Bush, it was the first Ithaca song where Azzouz used clean singing. Following the instrumental interlude "(No Translation)", the album's title track discusses the value of words. "Clsr." concerns the aftermath of betrayal, whilst "Gilt" is about "mutual destruction". "Better Abuse" is about being unable to remove oneself from the source of their suffering. Azzouz said that Ithaca "didn't want [the album] to finish on a high note or a resolution or happy ending," citing the absence of it.

== Release and promotion ==
The Language of Injury would not see a release for almost two years. Chetan-Welsh said that for "various reasons", it "came out much later that [Ithaca] wanted [it to]". On 29 October 2018, the band announced the album and released its title track as its lead single. After premiering the song on Decibel three days prior, they released "Slow Negative Order" as the second single on 1 December 2018. On 14 January 2019, the band premiered a music video for the third and final single, "Impulse Crush", through Kerrang!.

The Language of Injury was released through Holy Roar Records on 1 February 2019. Ithaca celebrated the album's release with a concert at the Old Blue Last in London, where they performed to a crowd of 150 people. The band were supported by Nihility and Calligram, and Justine Jones of Employed to Serve joined them onstage during their performances of "Ashes" and "Youth vs Wisdom". In March and April 2019, the band performed a mixture of headlining and supporting shows across the United Kingdom, before embarking on a co-headlining tour with Leeched between 28 May and 2 June. In August 2019, Ithaca performed at the ArcTanGent festival. In November, they toured the UK again supporting Jamie Lenman. In February and March 2020, Ithaca toured Europe as support for Big Thief. The band were in Copenhagen when Denmark enacted lockdown measures against the COVID-19 pandemic, forcing them to cancel the remaining dates and return to the United Kingdom.

== Critical reception ==
Professional ratings
Review scores
Source	Rating
Dead Press!	9/10
Distorted Sound	9/10
Kerrang!	4/5 stars
Metal Hammer Germany	6/7
Metal Hammer UK	9/10 marks
Ondarock	7/10
Ox-Fanzine	2.5/5 stars
Pitchfork	7.0/10

The Language of Injury was released to critical praise. Matt Mills of Metal Hammer hailed the album as "an unmitigated triumph" that "already feels destined to go down as one of 2019's most promising debuts". Similarly, Andrew Sacher of BrooklynVegan considered it "one of the finest 2019 debuts of its kind" for its mix of "nostalgia for the turn of the millennium and a strong embrace of the present". Bandcamp Daily selected it as their "Album of the Day" on 30 January 2019, with Camp calling it "a gorgeous, gargantuan record that flips hardcore sentimentalism on its head—not for the sake of novelty, but of necessity."

Ondarock's Alessandro Mattedi highlighted the album's "technical and explosive riffing" and the performances of Haycock and drummer James Lewis, but found Azzouz "almost intangible" and "muffled" by its poor mixing and production. Kelly, who viewed Azzouz's vocals to be one of Ithaca's "strongest assets", similarly felt that the production allowed her to get "unintentionally buried under the sound and the fury". Although he felt that the band had "one or two ideas" and "an enormously varied singer", Julius Lench of Ox-Fanzine found the album "dull" and criticized its overuse of breakdowns.

The Language of Injury appeared on the end-of-year albums lists for 2019 by Kerrang!, Metal Hammer and Revolver, whom respectively ranked it at number 49, number 37 and number 20. Kez Whelan of The Quietus ranked the album at number 13 on his list of the "Top Metal Albums Of 2019", whilst Consequence listed it as one of the year's "Top 10 Underground Metal Albums".

== Track listing ==
All tracks are written by Ithaca.

No.	Title	Length
1.	"New Covenant"	2:59
2.	"Impulse Crush"	3:10
3.	"Secretspace"	2:46
4.	"Slow Negative Order"	2:47
5.	"(No Translation)"	2:01
6.	"The Language of Injury"	3:18
7.	"Clsr."	3:43
8.	"Youth vs Wisdom"	1:44
9.	"Gilt"	3:03
10.	"Better Abuse"	5:25
Total length:		30:59

== Personnel ==
Adapted from liner notes.

Ithaca
- Djamila Boden Azzouz – lead vocals
- Sam Chetan-Welsh – guitar and backing vocals
- Will Street – guitar
- Drew Haycock – bass guitar
- James Lewis – drums

Additional musicians

- Susie Wederburn – trumpet (10)
- Amy Squire – violin (10)
Production
- Joe Clayton – recording, mixing (at Nø Studio)
- Brad Boatright – mastering (at Audiosiege)

Artwork

- Kathryn Lewis – artwork, layout

== Release history ==
Release history and formats for The Language of Injury
Region	Date	Format	Label	Catalog #	Ref.
Various	1 February 2019	CD; LP; DD	Holy Roar	HRR276	
Various	May 2021	LP	Hassle	HOFF372LP	
