= Pilot (Mallory Knox EP) =

EP by Mallory Knox
- Released: 4 July 2011
- Recorded: 2011 at Studio Glasseye
- Genres: Alternative rock, post-hardcore
- Length: 21:13
- Label: A Wolf at Your Door
- Producer: Dan Lancaster

Mallory Knox chronology
Pilot (2011)	Signals (2013)

Pilot is the début EP released and produced by the British alternative rock band Mallory Knox.

== Release ==
After approximately 3 months of writing songs, the band started to play local shows in Cambridge around November. They later recorded this EP at Studio Glasseye with the help of producer Dan Lancaster (We Are The Ocean, Lower Than Atlantis). The band released the EP on 14 July after gaining more exposure by getting as many people as they could to listen to their songs.

== Critical reception ==
Professional ratings
Review scores
Source	Rating
Alter The Press!	4/5
Kerrang!	KKKK
Ourzone Magazine	9/10
Rock Sound	8/10

This EP was met with mostly positive reviews, although not many due to the minor popularity of the band at the time of release. Alter The Press! stated that the most striking aspect was Chapmans vocals used throughout the album, stating that "His sultry voice serves as a guide on ‘Oceans’ and never wavers into the more common paper-thin falsetto territory that often sells best.", the review also consistently states that the EP is of the Pop rock genre, however unlike other bands, the band did not tire it out.

Ourzone Magazine called Mallory Knox "...the UK's next alt rock kings." rather than pop rock. The review continued to say that the EP had a diverse range of moods and settings, and also that it was inconsistent however this did not effect the EP negatively.

== Track listing ==
No.	Title	Length
1.	"Oceans" (^{α})	4:36
2.	"Resuscitate"	3:34
3.	"Promises"	4:14
4.	"Keeping Secrets"	4:03
5.	"Q.O.D."	4:46
Total length:		21:13

^α= These tracks were re-issued on the deluxe edition of Signals.

== Personnel ==
- Mikey Chapman – lead vocals
- Sam Douglas – vocals, bass guitar
- Joe Savins – lead guitar, backing vocals
- James Gillett – rhythm guitar
- Dave Rawling – drums
