= They Fear Us =

Studio album by Ithaca
- Released: 29 July 2022
- Studio: The Ranch Production House (Southampton)
- Genre: Metalcore
- Length: 35:04
- Label: Hassle
- Producer: Lewis Johns

Ithaca chronology
The Language of Injury (2019)	They Fear Us (2022)

Singles from They Fear Us
- 1. "They Fear Us" Released: 4 February 2022; 2. "In the Way" Released: 5 April 2022; 3. "Camera Eats First" Released: 31 May 2022; 4. "The Future Says Thank You" Released: 21 July 2022

Alternate vinyl cover

They Fear Us is the second and final studio album by the British metalcore band Ithaca, released on 29 July 2022 by Hassle Records. Recorded at The Ranch Production House with producer Lewis Johns, Ithaca aimed to experiment with the sound of metalcore, drawing inspiration and incorporating elements from a diverse range of genres. Its lyrics are centred on themes of "divine feminine power", empowerment, revenge, trauma, and healing. Ithaca utilised aesthetics unconventional for the metal genre in the album's cover artwork, press photos and music videos.

They Fear Us received critical acclaim for its songwriting, progression, and vocalist Djamila Boden Azzouz's performance. The album appeared on several year-end lists and earned Ithaca nominations in the "Best Production" and "Best Single" (for the title track) categories at the Heavy Music Awards 2023. The band toured the United Kingdom, Europe and the United States in support of the album. In November 2023, they performed the album in its entirety at The Dome in London.

== Background and recording ==
In February 2019, Ithaca released its debut album, The Language of Injury, through Holy Roar Records. The band were touring Denmark when the country enacted lockdown measures against the COVID-19 pandemic, forcing them to return to the United Kingdom, which enacted its own lockdown restrictions weeks later. Their efforts to work on new material, which had just commenced, were subsequently stalled. During the pandemic, vocalist Djamila Boden Azzouz's mother became seriously ill and the members of Ithaca dealt with grief, mental health issues, and internal conflict. Guitarist Sam Chetan-Welsh credited the pandemic with helping its members self-reflect and work on their mental health—he was able to work through his past trauma dating back to the recording of The Language of Injury—and take more creative risks. Bassist Dom Moss said that Azzouz's lyrics became less introspective and vicious as the pandemic receded. In addition, Ithaca left Holy Roar after its founder was accused of sexual misconduct in September 2020 and subsequently signed to Hassle Records.

They Fear Us was largely written organically and online; Azzouz felt the latter lent urgency to their few in-person meetups. Chetan-Welsh, who handled most of the writing, taught himself how to record demos during the pandemic and worked on programming drum loops and synth parts. In an interview with The Midlands Rocks, he stated that he would usually bring the band a riff or basic song structure based around a pattern by drummer James Lewis, who would also write around his riffs. The band would then build around what he had brought, with Azzouz providing feedback about song structures with her vocals. Azzouz credited Chetan-Welsh with coming up with some of the album's "more creative and out-there ideas".

Once writing was completed, Ithaca recorded They Fear Us at The Ranch Production House in Southampton with producer Lewis Johns. The extended recording window compared to the nine days they had for their previous album The Language of Injury allowed the band to experiment. Ithaca used both programmed and live synthesisers, including a Yamaha DX7 and a Fender Rhodes; Azzouz credited Johns with writing many of the album's synthesiser parts. Johns also wrote a horn arrangement for "You Should Have Gone Back". Chetan-Welsh said that Hassle "didn't ask any questions" during recording and "more or less" thanked the band when they turned the album in.

== Composition and lyrics ==
They Fear Us is a metalcore album. Ox-Fanzine's Rodney Fuchs and MetalSucks' Mandy Scythe underlined difficulties in categorizing its genre, with the former considering it "far beyond [...] designation". Chetan-Welsh described the album as "prog-hardcore". Its tracks have been described as incorporating elements from alternative rock, blackgaze, industrial metal, mathcore, new wave, nu metal, power pop, and shoegaze. Azzouz stated that Ithaca wanted to experiment with the sound of metalcore without "carbon copying" it, and pay tribute to bands that inspired them. The members of Ithaca's interests in djent, gospel, disco, and 1990s R&B ballads served as additional influences, alongside artists including Deftones, Prince, Van Halen, and Talking Heads. Chetan-Welsh drew influence from 1970s prog music and jazz, which he began listening to during the pandemic. Azzouz uses more clean singing than on Ithaca's previous album, having embraced it during recording after years of avoiding it by approaching it "the same way I look at screaming and using my voice as an instrument."

The lyrics of They Fear Us are centred on themes of "divine feminine power", empowerment, revenge, trauma, and healing. They also deal with "male power structures", self-discovery, and self-reflection. The album differed from The Language of Injury as Azzouz's lyrics were directed towards others rather than herself. Chetan-Welsh said it was structured to be mostly dark before becoming more optimistic towards the end as he believed nihilism was clichéd in metal music, and wanted to show that trauma could be healed from. In an interview with Boolin Tunes, Chetan-Welsh summarized the album's concept: "If you seek [healing from trauma], you'll have the internal infrastructure to be able to stand in this power and that is an act of rebellion to the structure of male power." Azzouz stated that They Fear Us took its name from the album being more empowering than The Language of Injury, and that "they" referred to those who undervalued or hurt others.

"In the Way" was intended a "revenge fantasy", while "The Future Says Thank You" was written about leaving a toxic environment. The latter's keyboards were intended to evoke "a specific John Carpenter/Goblin/giallo movie sound" according to Lewis, who also said that the song's call-and-response guitars and "ending off-snare" were both accidental. "They Fear Us" was written about finding and reclaiming power, and incorporates a dhol-like drum break and a field recording by Chetan-Welsh at his mother's funeral in India, of a priest leading a Ganga Aarti ceremony, a ritual to Mother Ganga. "Camera Eats First" is about self-hatred, understanding the causes behind it, and the dangers of basing one's self-perception on how others see them. The song was written after a drumbeat previously used by Lewis to warm his feet up, and featured explosion noises added during recording.

"Cremation Party" was written bassline first and subsequently completed on a digital audio workstation by Lewis and guitarist Will Sweet. "Number Five" was intended as a homage to Kittie, while "Fluorescent" was written about Azzouz's mother's illness. "You Should Have Gone Back" starts off as progressive metal before becoming post-hardcore. The last track, "Hold, Be Held" featuring guest vocalist and friend of the band Yansé Cooper, marks a drastic departure from the rest of the album and is a pop ballad about healing, honesty, and embracing trauma. Influenced by gospel and shoegaze, Chetan-Welsh deliberately wrote the song in the style of producers Jimmy Jam and Terry Lewis to evoke and match its themes of nostalgia and sentimentality.

== Release and promotion ==
Ithaca released a teaser video for They Fear Us in December 2021, and announced the album in February 2022. The latter was accompanied by the release of the title track, and followed later that month by a music video directed by Paul Cooke. Subsequent singles "In the Way" and "Camera Eats First" were released in April and May, the latter accompanied by a music video; a fourth single, "The Future Says Thank You", was released in July. The album was released on 29 July 2022 and promoted by a short headlining tour of the United Kingdom, on which they were supported by Pupil Slicer on all but two dates. The band released a music video for "Fluorescent" starring British comedian Ed Gamble on 1 June 2023. Between 23 September and 7 October 2023, they embarked on the Y'all Fear Us Tour, their first tour of the United States. They then performed They Fear Us in its entirety at The Dome in London, with additional instrumentation and vocalists on 25 November.

Inspired by the Talking Heads concert film Stop Making Sense, Ithaca utilised aesthetics unconventional for the metal genre in the album's artwork and music videos, drawn from its members' Arab and Indian cultural heritages, camp, "70s retro", Pre-Raphaelite art, and queer art and fashion. The album's look was intended to cause disruption and inspire people from different cultures in heavy music. Tying in with its themes of "divine feminine power", the album's cover presents Azzouz as a queen, seated on a throne in an orange dress with a crown, surrounded by her male bandmates in white and grey attire. This visual was featured throughout the album's press photos and music videos. Chetan-Welsh said that the rest of the band were intended as a "defensive line" behind Azzouz so that she could not be challenged. He further highlighted that, by being close, holding hands and touching each other, they were communicating their own femininity and intimacy. The video for the title track drew inspiration from the cover art and song and references experimental cinema, religious iconography, and pre-Raphaelite paintings.

== Critical reception ==
Professional ratings
Review scores
Source	Rating
Distorted Sound	9/10
Kerrang!	5/5
Metal Hammer	4.5/5 stars
New Noise Magazine	4/5 stars
Ox-Fanzine	4/5 stars
Pitchfork	7.4/10
Rock Hard	5.5/10
Sputnikmusic	3.5/5

They Fear Us received critical acclaim. Emma Wilkes of Kerrang! praised the album's stylistic diversity and heaviness. Elliot Leaver of Metal Hammer praised Azzouz's performance and its song structures. Fuchs, Andrew Sacher of BrooklynVegan, and Antonio Poscic of PopMatters felt that the album transcended the metalcore framework of The Language of Injury into a more stylistically varied sound, with Poscic opining that the album made "disparate styles flow elegantly into one another". Nat Lacuna of New Noise Magazine called it a "radical statement piece", while Patrick Lyons of Pitchfork highlighted the progression of Ithaca's songwriting and Azzouz's vocals from The Language of Injury. Sputnikmusic's Mitch Worden praised Azzouz's improved vocals and range, though felt the "streamlined" nature of the album's production divested its songs of their staying power and grit. Andreas Schiffman of Rock Hard felt that whilst the album displayed a few "genuinely impressive stylistic flourishes", it looked "rather bland" when compared with recent releases by Jinjer, Rolo Tomassi, and Venom Prison.

Kerrang! and Metal Hammer ranked it as the second and third best album of 2022, with the latter selecting it as the year's best metalcore album, while Addison Herron-Wheeler of New Noise Magazine ranked it first in her list of the best "Metal and Heavy Punk" releases of 2022 and PopMatters ranked it as the sixth-best metal album of the year. Sacher, in BrooklynVegan and Invisible Oranges, respectively ranked They Fear Us as the 24th best punk album and the 6th best metalcore album of 2022. MetalSucks and Rock Sound also included it in their end-of-year album lists. At the Heavy Music Awards 2023, They Fear Us and its title track received respective nominations for "Best Production" and "Best Single", although they won neither award.

== Track listing ==
All tracks are written by Ithaca.

No.	Title	Length
1.	"In the Way"	3:22
2.	"The Future Says Thank You"	3:38
3.	"They Fear Us"	4:10
4.	"Camera Eats First"	4:53
5.	"Cremation Party"	2:07
6.	"Number Five"	2:47
7.	"Fluorescent"	3:40
8.	"You Should Have Gone Back"	5:48
9.	"Hold, Be Held" (feat. Yansé Cooper)	4:34
Total length:		35:04

== Personnel ==
Adapted from liner notes.

Ithaca
- Djamila Boden Azzouz – lead vocals
- Sam Chetan-Welsh – guitar
- Will Sweet – guitar
- Dom Moss – bass guitar
- James Lewis – drums

Additional musicians

- Yansé Cooper – vocals (on "Hold, Be Held")
- Susie Wedderburn – brass
- Hannah Ashman – woodwind and keyboard
- Calum Muir – keyboard
- Lewis Johns – keyboard and programming
Production
- Lewis Johns – production and mixing (at The Ranch Production House)
- Grant Berry – mastering (at Fader Mastering)
- Simon Small – additional vocal recordings (at Tunnel of Reverb)

Artwork

- Martin "gingerdope" Wisniewska – photography
- Kathryn Lewis – artwork and layout

== Charts ==
Chart performance for They Fear Us
Chart (2022)	Peak position
UK Album Downloads (Official Charts)	52
UK Independent Albums (Official Charts)	46
