= Wired (Mallory Knox album) =

Studio album by Mallory Knox
- Released: 10 March 2017
- Studio: VADA Studios
- Length: 41:01
- Label: RCA
- Producer: Dan Austin

Mallory Knox chronology
Asymmetry (2014)	Wired (2017)	Mallory Knox (2019)

Singles from Wired
- 1. "Giving It Up" Released: 2 November 2016; 2. "Lucky Me" Released: 13 January 2017; 3. "Better Off Without You" Released: 20 January 2017; 4. "California" Released: 5 May 2017

Wired is the third studio album by the British rock band Mallory Knox. It was released on 10 March 2017 and is the last album to feature Mikey Chapman on lead vocals.

== Background and composition ==
Prior to joining the 2015 edition of Warped Tour in America, bassist Sam Douglas began to feel stressed. Initially, he presumed it to be burnout; however, upon visiting a doctor, he was prescribed anti-depressants. They made Douglas feel sick, and when Mallory Knox was on Warped Tour, he was "miserable. I didn't want to talk to anyone." The rest of the band was aware of Douglas' mental state, and subsequently held meetings in an attempt to, as vocalist Mikey Chapman describes, "try as a group to help him through."

Following the end of a UK tour in October 2015, the band began writing for Wired. The group initially had only one or two ideas. Douglas explained: "We can't write on the road, we need a rehearsal room ... [It] was daunting because it can take a couple of months to see what direction we're going in." Chapman mentioned that they were under a lot of stress and "were feeling a bit adrift." The band subsequently wrote "Giving It Up" in an hour and a half. The song gave the group "confidence and the vision to see what the record would become."

== Production ==
Recording took place at VADA Studios, on an estate near Birmingham with producer Dan Austin. On working with Austin, drummer Dave Rawling said: "He had so many great ideas on how to do things, and you can only hear by listening to this album like what he really does bring to the table." According to Douglas, the group wanted "something raw and live-sounding ... as if we’ve stood in front of them and played the songs to them." Instead of recording one instrument per week, the group opted to record the songs one-by-one, something that guitarist Joe Savins considered "the most influential thing we've ever done in terms of recording."

Their previous album Asymmetry was recorded by doing drums, then bass, then guitars, then vocals, taking nearly three months to accomplish. Whereas for Wired, the song-by-song approach only took a month to do. The producer had guitarist James Gillett play the songs in their entirety five times over and utilised the best take. In September 2016, Chapman revealed that the group were "starting to get mixes and stuff back now."

== Music and lyrics ==
"In so many ways people are closer than ever before because of our online connectivity; we're wired together, and yet we're also so much more distant disconnected."

— Mikey Chapman, discussing the album's title, 2016

Chapman referred to Asymmetry as "almost a diagonal sidestep" from their debut Signals, whereas Wired "really feels like what we really wanted to do with that record ... tak[ing] an intentional step forward." Douglas said that a number of songs deal with anxieties and love, and the "way these are perceived online through our social media connections." According to Douglas, "Giving It Up" is about the "frustration of giving everything to something you're passionate about & truly believe in, only to have other people step in who don’t share the same passion as you and hinder your progress." The lyrics to "California" were inspired during a drive through Florida while on Warped Tour in 2015. According to Chapman, it was from his point-of-view talking to Douglas: "It was me going, 'Look I know you have this perspective right now, and it's hard to pull yourself out, but if you could for five minutes, you'd see this wonderful situation around you.'"

Discussing the album's title-track, Douglas said that when people are going through a "bad phase, go online and see their mates having the time of their lives. Your life feels a bit worse." The aftermath of Douglas' Warped Tour experience was detailed in the tracks "For You" and "Better Off Without You". Douglas described "For You" as a love song for his girlfriend "without going, 'I love you ...' It's more, 'I know I'm a bit fucked up ... but I'm determined to make it better.'" With "Better Off Without You", which also talked about anti-depressant citalopram, Douglas described it as: "For something so personal it all felt very impersonal. Sometimes the biggest part is the realisation that you are fucked up." According to Chapman, "Lucky Me" is about "desire, and the fulfilment of that desire ... Sometimes you just gotta write a song about sex." Referring to "Saviour", Chapman said: "We as a global society require a revolution of the mind in order to take a step out of our dark past and into a future based on scientific fact, technological advancement and positive social progression." Douglas considered "Mother" "a really heartfelt piece of music but in a really up lifting way."

== Release ==
Professional ratings
Review scores
Source	Rating
Kerrang!	4/5
Rock Sound	7/10

On 2 November 2016, Wired was announced for release, and the album's artwork and track listing was revealed. On the same day, "Giving It Up" was released as a single. On 9 November, a music video was released for "Giving It Up". According to Chapman, the video centres on being addicted to technology and "the fact it brings people much closer together and yet so much further away at the same time." On 16 December, a lyric video was released for "Lucky Me", which was released as a single on 13 January 2017. On 20 January, "Better Off Without You" was released as a single. A week later, a music video was released for the song. "Saviour" was made available for streaming on 2 March. Wired was released on 10 March through RCA Records. In March and April, the band went on a headlining tour of the UK with support from Lonely the Brave and Fatherson. As part of Record Store Day 2017, the group released a 7" vinyl consisting of "Wired" and a demo, "89".

== Track listing ==
1. "Giving It Up" – 3:09
2. "California" – 3:51
3. "Wired" – 4:24
4. "For You" – 4:00
5. "Midnight" – 3:11
6. "Better Off Without You" – 2:56
7. "Falling in Love" – 4:53
8. "Lucky Me" – 3:21
9. "Saviour" – 3:44
10. "Come Back Around" – 3:32
11. "Mother" – 4:00

== Personnel ==
Personnel per booklet.

Mallory Knox

- Mikey Chapman – lead vocals; backing vocals (tracks 4 and 7), percussion (track 4)
- Sam Douglas – bass guitar; backing vocals (tracks 1, 3, 4, 7, 8 and 10), lead vocals (tracks 2–5, 7, 10 and 11), keys (tracks 2, 10 and 11), piano (track 5)
- James Gillett – rhythm guitar (tracks 1, 3, 4, 6, 9 and 11), lead guitar (tracks 1–3 and 5–10), keys (track 2), percussion (tracks 3 and 8)
- Joe Savins – lead guitar (tracks 1, 3, 4, 6, 9 and 11), rhythm guitar (tracks 1–3 and 5–10)
- Dave Rawling – drums; percussion (tracks 3, 4, 6, 9 and 11)

Additional musicians

- Mallory Knox – backing vocals (tracks 2, 6 and 9), chorus vocals (track 11)
- Gethin Pearson – programming
- Dan Austin – additional programming

Production

- Dan Austin – producer, mixing, engineer
- Gethin Pearson – additional production, additional engineering
- Liam Farrell – assistant
- Matt Colton – mastering

== Charts ==
Chart (2017)	Peak position
Scottish Albums (Official Charts)	25
UK Albums (Official Charts)	18
UK Rock & Metal Albums (Official Charts)	1
