= Mallory Knox (album) =

Studio album by Mallory Knox
- Released: 16 August 2019
- Label: A Wolf At Your Door Records

Mallory Knox chronology
Wired (2017)	Mallory Knox (2019)	Afterglow (2027)

Singles from Mallory Knox
- 1. "Black Holes" Released: 19 February 2018; 2. "White Lies" Released: 15 May 2019; 3. "Guts" Released: 10 June 2019; 4. "Livewire" Released: 15 July 2019; 5. "Wherever" Released: 12 August 2019

Mallory Knox is the fourth studio album by the British rock band Mallory Knox. It was released on 16 August 2019, through A Wolf At Your Door Records, and is the only album to feature bassist Sam Douglas on lead vocals.

== Background ==
On 14 February 2018, lead vocalist Mike Chapman left the group, and they decided to not replace him with a new singer, saying that "2018 marks a brand new chapter for the band and we’re excited to be continuing Mallory Knox with Sam taking the lead on vocals".

The group also hinted at the release of a new record: "We’ve been working hard behind the scenes writing and recording new music. We are very keen for you to hear it and you won’t be waiting long".

On 19 February 2018, Mallory Knox premiered "Black Holes", the first track as a four-piece.

On 15 May 2019, they announced the release of a new album, and revealed a new single, "White Lies". Sam Douglas stated that “the album was recorded over four different sessions & ‘White Lies’ was the last song we wrote for the record. I feel like it’s the song I’ve always wanted to write & collectively we’re all very proud of it.”

He described the record as “a carefree, no strings attached record where we have done everything completely our way. If we were to stop right now, this is the album that I would show people that best represents us.”

On 10 June, the band released a second single, "Guts", followed by the song "Livewire" on 15 July.

On 12 August, Mallory Knox premiered a fifth single, "Wherever".

== Critical reception ==
Professional ratings
Review scores
Source	Rating
3 Songs & Out	5/5 stars
DEAD PRESS!	9/10 stars
Kerrang!	KK
Muzik Speaks	3.5/5
NARC. Magazine	4/5
The Soundboard	7/10

Mallory Knox is a "riff-heavy, stripped back and very much garage rock" album, with "true-to-form riffs and power packed melodies that they have always been known for, but with a new twist".

It has received mixed reviews: critics appreciate the brave choice of the band to continue with Sam Douglas on vocals, determining a new direction for Mallory Knox. At the same time, the album is perceived as a test stand for Douglas and his capabilities as new frontman, as he "doesn’t quite have the power behind his voice that he might have liked and even one track that feels like his vocal is lacking in energy".

This album represents a significant shift in the career of Mallory Knox, who have been capable of reinventing themselves and are establishing a new sound, filled with darker and rougher melodies compared to their older releases.

== Track listing ==
No.	Title	Length
1.	"Psycho Killer"	03:59
2.	"White Lies"	03:07
3.	"The World I Know"	04:04
4.	"Livewire"	03:12
5.	"Wherever"	04:08
6.	"Freaks"	03:54
7.	"Fine Lines"	03:37
8.	"Black Holes"	03:27
9.	"4"	02:54
10.	"Radio"	02:57
11.	"Heartbreak Lover"	04:07
12.	"Guts"	02:18
Total length:		41:00

== Personnel ==
- Sam Douglas – lead vocals, bass guitar
- James Gillett – rhythm guitar, backing vocals
- Joe Savins – lead guitar, backing vocals
- Dave Rawling – drums
