= Signals (Mallory Knox album) =

Studio album by Mallory Knox
- Released: 21 January 2013
- Recorded: January 2012
- Genres: Alternative rock, pop rock
- Length: 41:05
- Label: A Wolf at Your Door
- Producer: Daniel Lancaster

Mallory Knox chronology
Pilot (2011)	Signals (2013)	Asymmetry (2014)

Singles from Signals
- 1. "Death Rattle" Released: 8 August 2012; 2. "Wake Up" Released: 21 October 2012; 3. "Lighthouse" Released: 2 January 2013; 4. "Beggars" Released: 12 March 2013; 5. "Hello" Released: 2 June 2013

Signals is the debut album by the British rock band Mallory Knox. The album was released on 21 January 2013.

== Background ==
Mallory Knox formed in September 2009. After two months, drummer Dave Rawling, bassist Sam Douglas, and guitarist Joe Savins invited guitarist James Gillett and vocalist Mikey Chapman to a practice session. The group hit it off instantly, as Chapman explains, "Everyone was on the same page; we were all there for the right reasons". All of the members had previously played in locals band prior to Mallory Knox.

Looking back in 2017, Douglas said the group wrote Signals "in the way we did because we were 19 and didn't have much to say." "Creeper" was written during a period when Chapman was growing sick of what was on TV. According to Chapman, "I was watching the House of Commons and seeing them talk over one another and talk shit and just being completely pathetic and pointless and wasting time. It just really wound me up."

The band recorded Signals in three weeks in January 2012. Drums were tracked in a day and a half.

== Release ==
The album was recorded a year before its release. The band waited after the album's recording to gain some radio and press behind the album to back it up so as when it was released it would gain further promotion. A year elapsed before the band decided to release Signals on 21 January 2013 through A Wolf at Your Door. Following this, all of the band members quit their day jobs to focus on Mallory Knox as a full-time project. A deluxe edition was released on 7 October. The bonus tracks that came from the deluxe editions consisted of new tracks and also a re-release of Oceans, previously recorded on their début EP Pilot. For the release of the deluxe edition, the band embarked on a headlining tour across the UK, along with band Blitz Kids and The Crooks as supporting bands. The band performed as part of Warped Tour Australia in November and December.

== Reception ==
Professional ratings
Review scores
Source	Rating
AbsolutePunk	(85%)
Ourzone Magazine	9/10

Signals was met with positive reviews by reviewers. AbsolutePunk stated that the songs from the album were worthy of going on the radio, especially for the likes of the singles released from the album itself.

Ourzone Magazine explained that the album contained a mix of hyper and gentle songs, and that the band fitted into the trend of rock verging on mainstream styling. For this album, Ourzone placed the band at the top 25 bands to watch out for of 2013.

Signals was included on Rock Sound's "50 Best Albums of 2013" list at number 22.

== Track listing ==
No.	Title	Length
1.	"Beggars"	3:40
2.	"Lighthouse"	4:00
3.	"Death Rattle"	3:45
4.	"Wolves"	3:14
5.	"1949"	4:05
6.	"Wake Up"	3:56
7.	"Hello"	3:28
8.	"Misdemeanour"	2:44
9.	"Bury Your Head"	2:48
10.	"Signals"	4:25
11.	"Creeper"	4:41
Total length:		41:05

Deluxe edition bonus tracks
No.	Title	Length
12.	"Maps"	3:04
13.	"Lights"	3:56
14.	"Oceans"	4:36
15.	"Resuscitate" (acoustic)	4:10
16.	"Lighthouse" (live in Cambridge)	5:23
Total length:		1:02:14

== Personnel ==
Mallory Knox

- Mikey Chapman – lead vocals
- Sam Douglas – vocals, bass guitar
- James Gillett – rhythm guitar, backing vocals
- Joe Savins – lead guitar, backing vocals
- Dave Rawling – drums

Production

- Dan Lancaster – producer, mixer

Artwork

- Craig Lister – art direction and design
- David Kai Piper – photography

== Charts ==
Chart (2013)	Peak position
UK Albums Chart	33
