= Asymmetry (Mallory Knox album) =

Studio album by Mallory Knox
- Released: 27 October 2014
- Recorded: January–April 2014
- Studios: Moles Studio, Bath
- Genre: Alternative rock
- Length: 48:01
- Labels: Search and Destroy, Epic
- Producer: Gil Norton

Mallory Knox chronology
Signals (2013)	Asymmetry (2014)	Wired (2017)

Singles from Asymmetry
- 1. "Ghost in the Mirror" Released: 30 June 2014; 2. "Shout at the Moon" Released: 26 October 2014; 3. "When Are We Waking Up?" Released: 12 December 2014; 4. "Getaway" Released: 17 March 2015; 5. "Heart & Desire" Released: 26 May 2015

Asymmetry is the second album by British rock band Mallory Knox. It was released on 27 October 2014 via Search and Destroy and Epic Records and was produced by Gil Norton. It is the band's first release after departing from A Wolf at Your Door Records.

Asymmetry charted at no. 16 in the UK album charts in the first week of sales. Like their debut album, it was released to very high positive reviews from music critics.

== Background and composition ==
[W]e've been through lots personally, deteriorating relationships, keeping up friendships, how hard that can be when you're away. So to me, the title says we're still the same people, but our circumstances are completely different.

— Sam Douglas, on the album's title, 2014

The band signed to a major label and received "all the ability that gives you when it comes to writing and recording", according to vocalist Mikey Chapman. Despite having waited a year before releasing Signals, the group did not write any new material. When the band began writing new compositions they were stuck writing unsatisfactory material for a few months. Eventually, the group "got into this rhythm", according to bassist Sam Douglas and wrote the album in a month. A few parts that did not make it on to Signals was used for Asymmetry. Half of the lyrics were written by Douglas, and the other half by Chapman. Douglas mentioned that the lyrics were about "love and loss", while Chapman said the lyrics were "a lot more direct this time." Looking back in 2017, Douglas said "we'd broken up with girlfriends, so we had love songs to get out."

The band wanted to write an album that they would listen to if they were another band. "Ghost in the Mirror" is about feeling haunted by someone's presence when they're not really there. "Getaway" is about the complications of a relationship. "Dying to Survive" is Chapman venting his frustration towards the difference in treating different people. "Shout at the Moon" is "about that period between being awake and sleep". "Fire" tells a story of when your home and safe haven is taken away from you with "When Are We Waking Up" continuing from that stating that you still have the power to change things and you should never lose hope. "She Took Him to the Lake" expresses a range of emotions in general. It was originally made of two separate songs, "She Took Him" and "To the Lake". "Heart & Desire" is a personal song to Chapman and tells a story about a person he moved away from but despite the sadness he is grateful for the times together. "Heart & Desire" was easier to write compared to the other songs, according to Chapman. "Lonely Hours" is about forgiving and forgetting for your own sanity. "The Remedy" expresses the time where you give into emotions and urges. "Dare You" is another personal experience of Chapman's when he wrote the song during a time when he felt destroyed.

== Recording ==
On 6 January 2014 Mallory Knox began pre-production at Moles Studio in Bath, Somerset with producer Gil Norton. The group were initially nervous working with Norton. While doing pre-production on "Ghost in the Mirror", Norton was strident about a particular section of the song, which made Chapman realised he "need[ed] to speak my mind here and hope it doesn't fall to pieces". The band planned to be in the studio for over a month. The studio burnt down, forcing the band to move to another studio. The group soon "ran out of time there", according to Chapman, resulting in them moving to another studio. The band tracked drums in two weeks, then proceeded to work on bass, guitars and vocals. The group spent nearly three months in the studio, eventually leaving in April. In the Rock Sound magazine, the band stated that they had written 16 songs, but are going to commit to 10 or 11 of them for the follow-up to their previous album, Signals (2013). They also stated that the album could be released as early as spring in the same year.

== Release ==
The band's second album was officially announced in late June 2014 on their social media outlets, revealing the album's artwork, its title Asymmetry. The first song heard off the album, titled "QOD II", was streamed on BBC Radio 1 with Zane Lowe in early June. After it was played on the radio it was made available of the band's official YouTube channel. The first single released was "Ghost in the Mirror" on 30 June along with the announcement of the album's other details, also revealing that "QOD II" is in fact a bonus track of the deluxe edition of the album. In the following month the official music video for the single was also released, along with pre-orders also made available of which when you pre-ordered you would gain the single. According to Chapman, the band wanted the video to have a "dark, moody feel" to match the song. The third song to be released of the album was "Shout At the Moon" on 10 September and was also accompanied by a music video. The song itself is intended to be released as the second single off the album on 26 October, a day before the release of the album itself. The album was initially planned for release on 13 October through Search and Destroy and Epic Records. It was delayed to 27 October.

The band is set to headline in a UK tour throughout November along with support acts Frank Iero, Fort Hope and Moose Blood. Due to popular demand this tour was extended by adding another date to their London show. Asked where the concept for the "Heart & Desire" video came from, Chapman replied that the band "love the whole space [setting]! Movies set in space are the most captivating because there's always a chance of something going wrong."

== Reception ==
Rob Sayce of Rock Sound wrote that the album "picks up exactly where ‘Signals’ left off." He remarked the album was full of "ingenious vocal interplay and moments of genuine audacity". He concluded with saying the collection of songs "place [the band] on the top tier of British rock".

The album was included at number 39 on Rock Sound's "Top 50 Albums of the Year" list. The album was included at number 16 on Kerrang!'s "The Top 50 Rock Albums Of 2014" list.

== Track listing ==
All tracks are written by Mallory Knox

No.	Title	Length
1.	"Ghost in the Mirror"	3:48
2.	"Getaway"	3:36
3.	"Dying to Survive"	4:24
4.	"Shout at the Moon"	3:27
5.	"Fire"	3:54
6.	"When Are We Waking Up?"	3:47
7.	"She Took Him to the Lake"	7:20
8.	"Heart & Desire"	4:19
9.	"Lonely Hours"	5:00
10.	"The Remedy"	3:36
11.	"Dare You"	4:58

Deluxe edition bonus tracks
No.	Title	Length
12.	"Piece of My Heart"	3:24
13.	"Glimmer"	2:50
14.	"QOD II"	4:04

== Personnel ==
Mallory Knox

- Mikey Chapman – lead vocals
- Sam Douglas – vocals, bass guitar
- James Gillett – rhythm guitar, backing vocals
- Joe Savins – lead guitar, backing vocals
- Dave Rawling – drums

== Chart positions ==
Chart (2013)	Peak position
UK Albums Chart	16
