= Lonely the Brave =

English alternative rock band from Cambridge

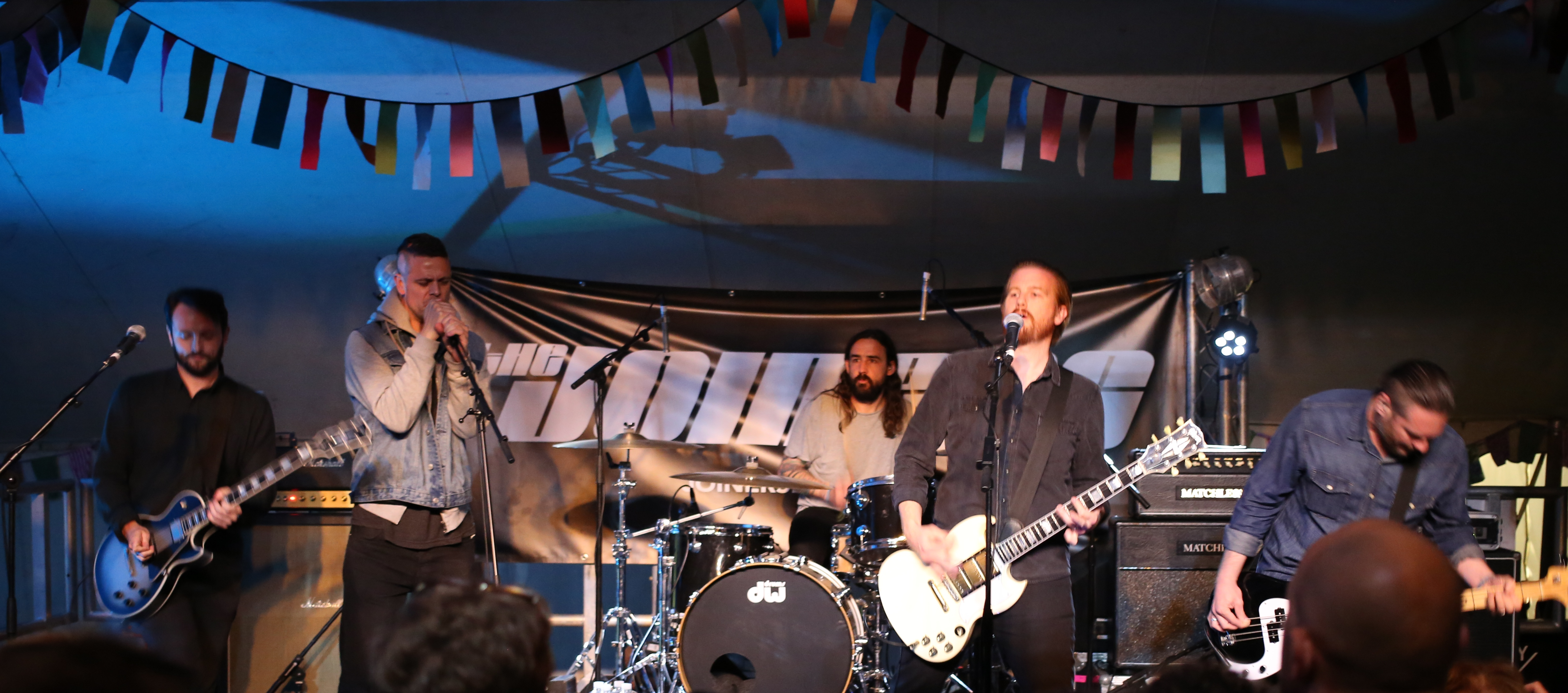
- Lonely the Brave performing on the uncommon people stage at Common People Southampton 2016

Background information
- Origin: Cambridge, England
- Genres: Alternative rock, post-hardcore
- Years active: 2008–present
- Labels: Hassle, Columbia, RCA, Easy Life
- Members: Andrew Bushen; Gavin Edgeley; David Jakes; Ross Smithwick; Mark Trotter
- Past members: Jack Bennett; Joel Mason
- Website: www.lonelythebrave.com

Lonely the Brave are an English alternative rock band from Cambridge, England. They formed in 2008. The members comprise Mark Trotter (lead guitar), Gavin Edgeley (drums), Andrew Bushen (bass), and Ross Smithwick (rhythm guitar). Smithwick joined in 2014. The band are inspired by an eclectic mix, including Bruce Springsteen, Pearl Jam and Deftones. One journalist remarked that this culminates in "Biffy Clyro-shaped stadium rock".

== History ==
Lonely the Brave formed in Cambridge, England, in 2008 after the individual band members prior local bands had disbanded. They already knew one another through Cambridge's local music scene.

Around 2010, they released their self-funded EP, Backroads, and began building a following through live shows. In 2013, they signed to Hassle Records and began preparing their debut album.

=== The Day's War and Things Will Matter ===
Their debut album, The Day’s War, was released on 16 September 2014 and reached the UK Top 20. It was originally scheduled for 2 June 2014, but the release was delayed after the band signed an international deal with Columbia Records.

In early 2014 Ross Smithwick joined as a second guitarist. Joel Mason had briefly filled the additional guitar role before leaving to pursue solo projects.

They recorded and released their second album, Things Will Matter, in 2016 through Hassle Records.

After signing to Columbia Records, the band were dropped by the label while preparing their follow-up. That frustration found its way into the music. Trotter said there was an element of “OK, f*** it” in the record, and that listeners could hear their anger in certain tracks.

In a 2016 interview with Varsity, Trotter explained that the band had changed considerably as people and musicians. Two members had become fathers, and they were more experienced in the music industry. Smithwick's arrival also altered the songwriting process. Some songs dated back to shortly after the first album had been completed, while others were finished just before recording. His contributions helped push the music in new directions. The result was a record that retained the band's huge choruses and atmospheric guitars but had a heavier, more layered sound.

The Redux version: In 2017, they reworked the album with more electronic textures and alternative arrangements.

=== David Jakes Departure ===
On 11 March 2018 the band announced, in a heartfelt email to fans, that David Jakes would be leaving for mental health reasons. David included a letter to fans within the statement;

"I’m writing this with the news that I’ve decided to call it a day with Lonely The Brave.

I’m afraid the problems I’ve been having, with touring and playing live, have made things really difficult concerning my mental health side of things. Sorry I couldn’t push on through it.

To the LTB boys… Thank you for the amazing time I had with you.All the best with the band going forward.Thank you Wez, James and Mease.

Most of all thank you to everyone I saw at the gigs and spent their money on the music I was part of. It meant so much!"

In his new Kerrang! interview, published on 27 October 2026, Trotter reflected on the years leading up to Jakes's departure: “Looking back on that period now, we were all pretty f***ed.” He explained that Dave had been the one brave enough to recognise that things weren't working for him and step away. Trotter said he had nothing but respect for that decision.

=== The Hope List & What We Do We Feel ===
In August 2018, Jack Bennett joined the band to fill his lead vocal role. In April 2020 the band released their first material with Bennett on Easy Life Records: the single “Bound” was premiered on BBC Radio 1.

Their third album, The Hope List, was released on 22 January 2021 and reached the number 73 in the UK charts. After Jakes left in 2018, the band spent roughly two years finding their feet with Bennett before releasing the album. The album was made in spare time around jobs and family commitments. Some members were NHS key workers during the COVID-19 pandemic.

Their second and final album with Jack Bennett, What We Do We Feel, was released on 10 November 2023. By this point, the band were more comfortable with Bennett and increasingly willing to push beyond their established sound.

=== Reunion ===
Bennett said on 24 January 2026 that he is no longer with the band. The band announced on 20 July 2026 on their Instagram page that David Jakes had rejoined the band as lead singer, and they would start touring in November 2026.

The band released their new single ‘So Nearly’, in October 2026, their first with original singer Dave Jakes in over 10 years. They also announced a full UK tour follow next year.

== Members ==
Current

- Andrew Bushen – bass guitar (2008–present)
- Gavin Edgeley – drums/backing vocals (2008–present)
- David Jakes – lead vocals (2008–2018, 2026–present)
- Mark Trotter – lead guitar/backing vocals (2008–present)
- Ross Smithwick – rhythm guitar/backing vocals (2014–present)

Former

- Jack Bennett – lead vocals (2018–2026)
- Joel Mason – rhythm guitar (2013–2014)

== Discography ==
=== Studio albums ===
Year	Title	Peak chart positions	Label
Year	Title	UK	Label
2014	The Day's War	14	Hassle
2016	Things Will Matter	35	Hassle
2021	The Hope List	73	Easy Life
2023	What We Do to Feel	—	Easy Life

=== Extended plays ===
Year	Title	Label
2008	For an Exit Light	self released
2010	Backroads	self released
2014	Backroads	Hassle Records
2014	Live at Angel Studios	Hassle Records
2015	Call of Horses	Hassle Records
2015	split with frnkiero andthe cellabration	Hassle Records
2016	Dust & Bones	Hassle Records
2017	Diamond Days	Hassle Records
2023	Long Way	Easy Life Records

== Music videos ==
Title	Year	Director
"Backroads"	2014	Greg Davenport
"Trick of the Light"	2014	A Nice Idea Every Day
"Victory Line"	2014	Jeff Le Bars
"The Blue, The Green"	2014	Greg Davenport
"Black Mire"	2016	Jordan Martins
"Radar"	2016	Lewis Cater
"What If You Fall In"	2016	Adriano Vessichelli
"Rattlesnakes"	2016	Rogier Hendriks
"Control"	2016	Joe Brady
"Dust & Bones"	2016	Ben Pollard
"Jaws of Hell"	2016	Johannes de Jong
"Bound"	2020	Zak Pinchin
