= We Are the Ocean =

English rock band

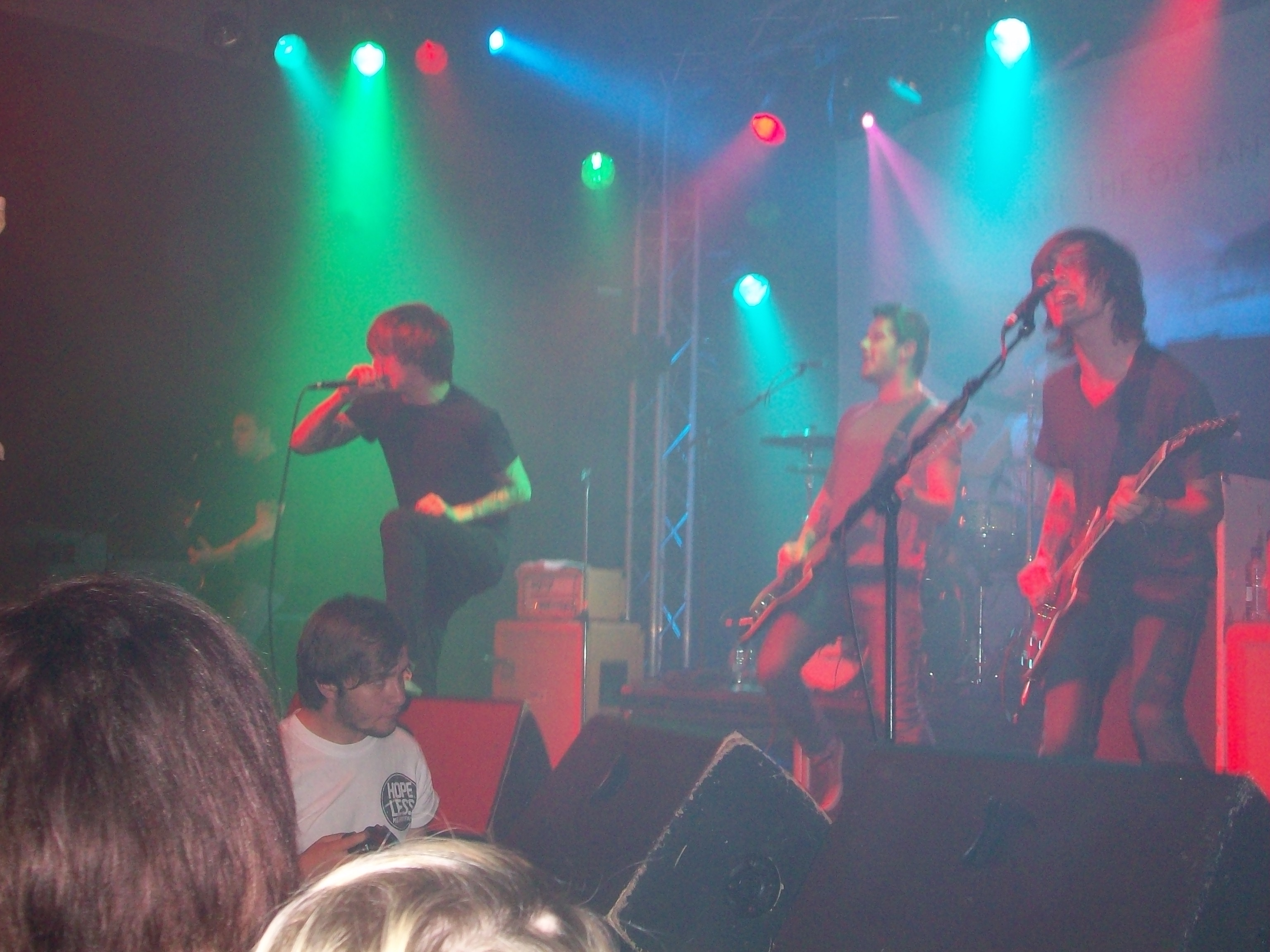
- We Are the Ocean performing at the Guildhall Arts Centre in Gloucester in August 2011

Background information
- Origin: Loughton, Essex, England
- Genres: Alternative rock; pop punk; indie rock; post-hardcore
- Years active: 2007–2017, 2022
- Labels: Hassle, SideOneDummy
- Members: Liam Cromby; Alfie Scully; Jack Spence; Tom Whittaker
- Past members: Dan Brown

We Are the Ocean is an English rock band originating from Loughton, Essex. The band's line-up includes Liam Cromby (lead vocals, guitar), Jack Spence (bass), Alfie Scully (guitar), and Tom Whittaker (drums). The band have released four albums since forming in 2007: Cutting Our Teeth in 2010, Go Now and Live in 2011, Maybe Today, Maybe Tomorrow in 2012, and Ark in 2015.

== History ==
=== Formation and self-titled debut EP (2007–2008) ===
Following the dissolution of Dan Brown and Jack Spence’s previous band, the pair began playing with local friends Liam Cromby, Rickie Bloom, and Tom Whittaker in 2007 under the name Dead But Still Dreaming. Shortly after, they rebranded as We Are the Ocean, and replaced Bloom with Alfie Scully. The band gained attention through online promotion via MySpace, which led to their nomination for the Kerrang! Best British Newcomer award in 2008. That same year, they independently released their debut self-titled EP, ‘We Are the Ocean.’

=== Cutting Our Teeth and subsequent touring (2008–2010) ===
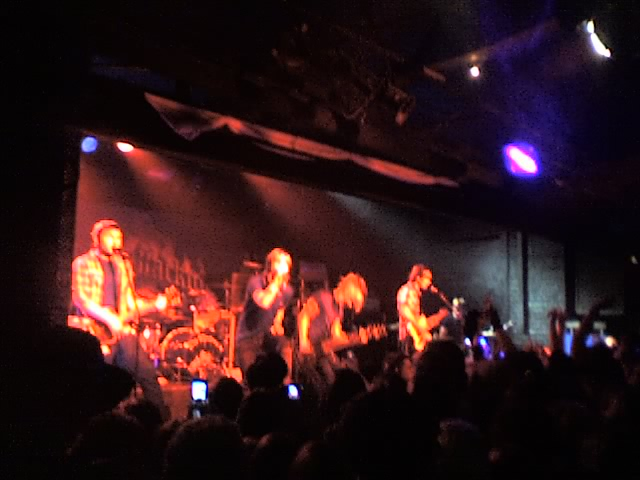
We Are the Ocean performing at Sheffield Leadmill, October 2008.

We Are the Ocean started writing material for their debut album, Cutting Our Teeth, around December 2008. The album was produced by Brian McTernan at Salad Days Studio in Baltimore, Maryland, USA. The album was due to be released in Summer 2009 but, for unknown reasons, was delayed a number of times before its eventual release on 1 February 2010. The band re-released Cutting Our Teeth in October 2010 as a deluxe edition with a second disc, featuring their limited-edition debut EP and four unheard tracks, which received positive feedback from critics.

The band has toured in various countries, including the UK, Europe, the US, and Australia, and participated in major festivals like Reading and Leeds Festival, Download Festival, and The Bamboozle in New Jersey, USA.

=== Departure of Dan Brown and Maybe Today, Maybe Tomorrow (2011–2013) ===
The band recorded their second album, Go Now and Live, with Pete Miles. The album's singles "What It Feels Like," "The Waiting Room," and "Runaway" were all playlisted on Radio 1. The album reached number 45 in the charts in its first week. On 1 March 2012, the band announced that they would be entering the studio in May to record their third full-length album. On 5 June 2012, it was announced on their Facebook page that the band had parted ways with frontman Dan Brown, who would instead be pursuing a career as a band manager. Cromby became the primary vocalist. Their third studio album Maybe Today, Maybe Tomorrow was released in the UK on 17 September 2012.

=== Ark and disbandment (2014–2017) ===
Under new management, the band recorded their fourth album, ARK, in the summer of 2014 and released a teaser single at the end of the year. They recorded a BBC Live Lounge session and played an acoustic version of the track along with a cover of London Grammar's 'Hey Now,' which led to BMG/Infectious signing the band. ARK was released on 11 May 2015, with the band touring in support of it shortly after. In early 2016, the band was dropped by their label for undisclosed reasons. On 18 January 2017, We Are the Ocean announced their disbandment and a farewell tour through Europe in February and March.

=== Reunion (2022) ===
"Our friendship inside and out of We Are The Ocean has always remained strong. The last 2 years have really put life into a new perspective, so we thought we owed it to ourselves and our fans to come together and do what we love to do best. In the rehearsal studio we found the energy was still there - it honestly felt better than ever - and that’s why we’ve decided to get back on stage together; to connect, share and celebrate We Are The Ocean"

— We Are the Ocean on Facebook

On 15 July 2022, the band issued a statement on Facebook about their reunion. They announced their first live show in five years, on 15 October in London's Omeara Venue.

== Band members ==
Current members

- Liam Cromby – lead vocals, rhythm guitar, piano (2007–2017, 2022)
- Alfie Scully – lead guitar (2007–2017, 2022), vocals (2012–2017, 2022)
- Jack Spence – bass, backing vocals (2007–2017, 2022)
- Tom Whittaker – drums, percussion (2007–2017, 2022)

Former members

- Dan Brown – lead vocals (2007–2012)

Timeline

== Discography ==
=== Studio albums ===
Title	Album details	Peak chart positions			
Title	Album details	UK	UK Indie	UK Rock	UK Digital
Cutting Our Teeth	Released: 1 February 2010; Format: CD, digital download; Label: Hassle Records	143	—	—	—
Go Now and Live	Released: 22 April 2011; Format: CD, digital download; Label: Hassle Records	45	5	3	40
Maybe Today, Maybe Tomorrow	Release Date: 17 September 2012; Format: CD, digital download; Label: Hassle Records	59	—	—	—
ARK	Release Date: 11 May 2015; Format: CD, digital download; Label: Hassle Records	73	13	4	—

=== Extended plays ===
List of albums
Title	Album details
We Are the Ocean	Released: 4 August 2008; Label: Hassle; Format: CD, digital download
Look Alive	Released: 16 November 2009; Label: Hassle; Format: CD, digital download

=== Singles ===
List of singles, with selected chart positions and certifications
Title	Year	Peak chart positions		Release
Title	Year	UK	SVK	Release
"Nothing Good Has Happened Yet"	2008	—	—	We Are the Ocean
"God Damn Good"	2009	—	—	We Are the Ocean
"Look Alive"	2010	—	—	Cutting Our Teeth
"These Days, I Have Nothing"	2010	—	—	Cutting Our Teeth
"All of This Has to End"	2010	—	—	Cutting Our Teeth
"Lucky Ones"	2010	—	—	Cutting Our Teeth
"What It Feels Like"	2011	—	70	Go Now and Live
"The Waiting Room"	2011	—	22	Go Now and Live
"Runaway"	2011	—	45	Go Now and Live
"Overtime Is a Crime"	2011	—	—	Go Now and Live
"Bleed"	2012	—	—	Maybe Today, Maybe Tomorrow
"The Road (Run for Miles)"	2012	—	—	Maybe Today, Maybe Tomorrow
"Now and Then (Acoustic)"	2021	—	—	Non-album single

=== Music videos ===
- "Save Me! Said the Saviour" (2007)
- "Nothing Good Has Happened Yet" (2008)
- "Welcome to My Broken Home"
- "Look Alive" (2009)
- "All of This Has to End" (2010)
- "These Days I Have Nothing" (2010)
- "Lucky Ones" (2010)
- "Waiting Room" (2011)
- "Runaway" (2011)
- "What It Feels Like" (2011)
- "Overtime Is a Crime" (2011)
- "The Road" (2012)
- "Young Heart" (2012)
- "Machine" (17 April 2013)
- "Chin Up, Son" (5 September 2013)
- "Holy Fire" (2015)
- "Do It Together" (2015)
- "Good For You" (2015)
- "Hey Now" (2015)
- "The Pretender (Foo Fighters cover)" (2015)
