= Hassle Records =

British record label

- Founded: 2005
- Founder: Chris Baker
- Distributor: PIAS
- Genre: Alternative rock, hardcore punk, punk rock, heavy metal
- Country of origin: United Kingdom
- Location: London
- Official website: hasslerecords.com

Hassle Records is an independent record label that was created by Chris Baker in the year 2005.

== Artists ==
Current

- Petrol Girls
- Under the Influence
- August Burns Red
- Cancer Bats
- The James Cleaver Quintet
- The Get Up Kids
- Juliette and the Licks
- Mirrortalk
- Pagan
- Thousand Foot Krutch
- Turbowolf
- The Used
- Casey
- Brutus
- Swedish Death Candy (Acid Rock from London/Seoul/Bari)
- Phoxjaw

Former

- Alexisonfire (United Kingdom only)
- Attack! Attack!
- Blitz Kids
- Canterbury
- Four Year Strong
- Ithaca
- Juliette Lewis
- Lonely the Brave
- Senses Fail
- Rolo Tomassi (Now on Destination Moon)
- Trash Talk
- We Are the Ocean
- 65daysofstatic
- Fact
