= Rolo Tomassi discography =

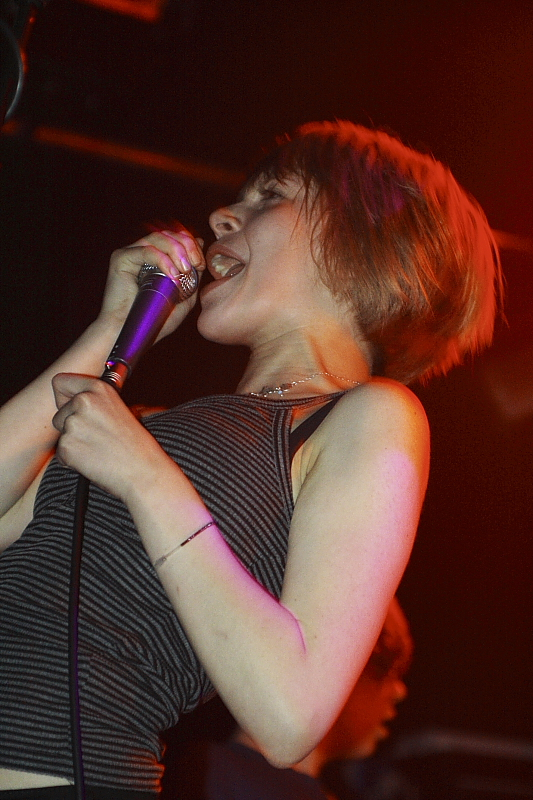
- Eva Spence live in Oxford, UK
- Studio albums: 5
- Extended plays: 11
- Compilation albums: 1
- Singles: 3
- Music videos: 7
- Demos: 2

This is the complete discography of the British mathcore band Rolo Tomassi.

== Albums ==
=== Studio albums ===
List of studio albums
| Title | Album details |
|---|---|
| Hysterics | Released: 22 September 2008; Label: Hassle |
| Cosmology | Released: 24 May 2010; Label: Hassle |
| Astraea | Released: 5 November 2012; Label: Destination Moon |
| Grievances | Released: 1 June 2015; Label: Holy Roar |
| Time Will Die and Love Will Bury It | Released: 2 March 2018; Label: Holy Roar |
| Where Myth Becomes Memory | Released: 4 February 2022; Label: MNRK |

=== Compilation albums ===
List of compilation albums
| Title | Album details |
|---|---|
| Eternal Youth | Released: 16 April 2011; Label: Destination Moon |

== Extended plays ==
List of EPs
| Title | Album details |
|---|---|
| 3 Track Demo | Released: 2005; Label: Mayday! |
| 4 Track Cassette | Released: 2005; Label: danger!laser!phaser!razor! |
| Rolo Tomassi EP | Released: 2006; Label: Holy Roar |
| Credit Card CD | Released: 2007; Label: Mayday! |
| Summer Tour 2007 | Released: 2007; Label: Mayday! |
| Remixo Tomassi Volume 1 | Released: 2007; Label: Mayday! |
| Rolo Tomassi – Live @ Eurosonic EP | Released: 8 March 2008; Label: Hassle |
| End Hysterics EP | Released: 3 October 2009; Label: Mayday! |
| Acoustics/Remixes | Released: December 2009; Label: Hassle |
| In The Echoes Of All Dreams | Released: October 2025; Label: MNRK Records LP |

== Split releases ==
| Year | Album details |
|---|---|
| 2006 | Rolo Tomassi / Mirror! Mirror! Split: Label: Speedowax |
| 2007 | Rolo Tomassi / Cutting Pink With Knives Split: Label: Yehonala Recordings |
| 2008 | Digital History / Beatrotter: Label: Holy Roar |
| 2009 | Shred Yr Face Vol. 2: Label: Wichita Records, Matador Records, Hassle Records, Coalition Records |
| 2009 | Rolo Tomassi / Cancer Bats Split: Released: 27 April 2009; Label: Hassle Records |
| 2009 | Rolo Tomassi / Throats Split: Released: 3 August 2009; Label: Hassle Records, Holy Roar |
| 2014 | Rolo Tomassi / Stockades Split: Released: 1 December 2014; Label: Tangled Talk |

== Singles ==
List of singles
| Title | Year | Album |
|---|---|---|
| "I Love Turbulence" | 2008 | Hysterics |
| "Party Wounds" | 2010 | Cosmology |
| "Old Mystics" | 2012 | non-album single |
| "Stage Knives" | 2015 | Grievances |
| "Opalescent" | 2015 | Grievances |
| "Rituals" | 2017 | Time Will Die and Love Will Bury It |
| "Balancing the Dark" | 2017 | Time Will Die and Love Will Bury It |
| "Aftermath" | 2018 | Time Will Die and Love Will Bury It |
| "Cloaked" | 2021 | Where Myth Becomes Memory |
| "Drip" | 2021 | Where Myth Becomes Memory |
| "Closer" | 2022 | Where Myth Becomes Memory |

== Covers ==
- Deftones's "Digital Bath" on Kerrang!'s Ultimate Rock Heroes (2015)

== Music videos ==
- "I Love Turbulence" (2008)
- "Oh, Hello Ghost" (2009)
- "Beatrotter" (2010)
- "Party Wounds" (2010)
- "Ex Luna Scientia" (2012)
- "Howl" (2013)
- "Opalescent" (2015)
- "The Embers" (2015)
- "Rituals" (2017)
- "Balancing The Dark" (2017)
- "Aftermath" (2018)
- "A Flood of Light" (2019)
- "Cloaked" (2021)
- "Drip" (2021)
- "Closer" (2022)
