= Astria =

Astria may refer to:

== People ==
- Astria Suparak, an American artist and curator
- Nicky Astria, an Indonesian musician

== Other ==
- Astria Ascending, a 2021 role-playing game
- Astria Regional Medical Center, a defunct hospital in Yakima, Washington, USA
- Astria Jewellery A Premium Jewellery Store in India.

== See also ==
- Astraea (disambiguation)
- Astrea (disambiguation)
- Astrée (disambiguation)
- Asteria (disambiguation)
- Austria (disambiguation)
