= Astraea (album) =

Studio album by Rolo Tomassi
- Released: 5 November 2012
- Recorded: Nottingham
- Genres: Mathcore; metalcore; progressive rock; synth-pop
- Length: 38:15
- Label: Destination Moon
- Producers: Jason Sanderson, Rolo Tomassi

Rolo Tomassi chronology
Eternal Youth (2011)	Astraea (2012)	Grievances (2015)

Singles from Astraea
- 1. "Ex Luna Scientia" Released: 26 September 2012

Astraea is the third studio album by British mathcore band Rolo Tomassi. It was released on 5 November 2012 in the United Kingdom through Destination Moon, the band's own record label. In interviews, the band described the composition of the album as being much more accessible and direct than their previous albums, while retaining the technical and experimental elements of their typical sound. The album was produced by Jason Sanderson, the producer of Rolo Tomassi's first album Hysterics. This is the band's first release with Chris Cayford and Nathan Fairweather in their line-up after the departure of Joseph Thorpe and Joe Nicholson.

The album was recorded in various locations across Nottingham, United Kingdom including James Spence's house and The Bodega club night venue. This was because the band's producer, Sanderson had come into contractual issues with the land owner of his recording studio. The album was critically acclaimed, praised for both its increased accessibility, sonic development and the increased use of Eva Spence's singing. However, the album performed poorly commercially, failing to chart or make significant sales in upon its release.

== Background ==
Rolo Tomassi only completed one short tour of the United Kingdom in 2011. They spent all the year preparing for their new album and the creation of Destination Moon, the band's own record label. They released a compilation CD, Eternal Youth, in mid-2011 to compile selected works from their numerous split EPs, demos and out-of-print extended plays. When asked about leaving Hassle to form their own record label, the band stated "We were questioning what we were doing for our label that we couldn't do ourselves. We've always been very proactive with the running of our band and we've never given away much freedom." The band announced in early February 2012 that both Joseph Thorpe and Joe Nicholson had left the band. This was because Joe Nicholson wanted to read chemistry at university, while Thorpe's reasons were related to personal differences. The band replaced both with Chris Cayford, who is the current frontman and former guitarist of No Coast, and Nathan Fairweather, who plays in Brontide, making this the first release with the new line-up.

The title of the album has been cited as having several origins. Some have suggested it gets its name from the Greek goddess of justice Astraea. Another possibility is ASTRAEA, (Autonomous Systems Technology Related Airborne Evaluation & Assessment) an acronym for the development of British unmanned aerial vehicle. The album's title acted as a reference to the Spence siblings' admiration for Greek mythology and a desire to pick a title that made the album "sound big and like this proper body of work". James Spence described Astraea and the band's previous album Cosmology as being "really grand titles".

== Writing and recording ==
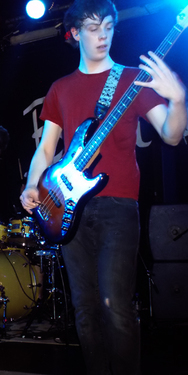
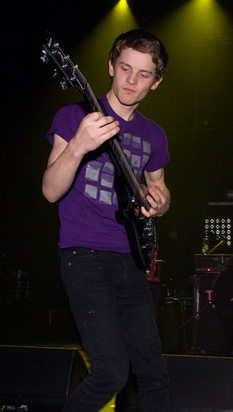
Joseph Thorpe (left) and Joe Nicholson (right) both announced their departure from Rolo Tomassi in early 2012.

Writing for the album started as early as July 2011. James Spence also had stated that in that period the band have at least two songs written with the lyrics being self-reflective, a common theme for the band's music. Around this time as well, Rolo Tomassi expressed interest in working with Anthony Gonzalez or Kurt Ballou respectively of M83 and Converge as producers for the third album. However at the time insufficient progress had been made for them to search for producers. James Spence had said that with this record he wished to experiment with shoegaze, "dreamy keyboard[s]" and using more melodic passages. Spence has also commented that "quite progressive synth-based music" such as M83 and the horror film soundtracks Goblin have produced acted as influences.

Because all the members were working their band schedule round their jobs they had to practice in basic recording rooms and write and record their own ideas. From this the members listened to each other's ideas and gave their interpretations and evaluations. Synthesiser player James felt the band produced their best work with this method as they were constantly assessing themselves.

In the writing of previous albums by Rolo Tomassi a majority of the music was written by James and Eva Spence wrote most of the lyrics. For Astraea, the band treated it as a collaboration between all five members; however James and Cayford were the "main brains". In January 2012, in an interview with Kerrang!, Eva Spence confirmed that the band are self-producing their third full-length with Hysterics producer Jason Sanderson. The choice of returning to Sanderson was because he has been a close friend of the band members for a long time. Regarding the sound of the album, she stated that it will be "more direct and heavier", but also noted that the band "will never shy away from being experimental". However, James Spence went on record saying that during the actual production of the album the band did not consider themselves as part of the overall production; rather just having a say in every aspect of the album progress. In April 2012, the NME did a studio update with on the album with James Spence stating that the band's writing was "70% complete". He credited how the new members Chris and Nathan "breathed new life" into the band's writing as the original three members had become "too set in their ways". The band members have commented that this has made the writing a lot more fun as the band no longer writes a song then learns it. As the band wrote Astraea they decided to contrast with their typical style more with the clean and ethereal parts, which led to an increase of Eva's singing.

They started recording Astraea in June at James Spence's house in Nottingham. They were forced into this situation as Sanderson's recording studio was taken from him through a contractual issue on the building with the landlord. The recording process was different from previous albums as there was a lot of production and pre-production involved. Sanderson would come to the practice sessions of the bands and make suggestions to the songs and then they would go to record it. The album took three months to record because of band member's personal commitments, this to James Spence had a positive effect as the members took their time with the music, believing the album was more "produced" than previous efforts. James believed Rolo Tomassi had much more of an opportunity to experiment in the studio and try things they had never tried before. However, James had commented that the recording of the album in his house revealed to be a stressful decision. An example of this was were his basement- where all the recording equipment was- flooded due to heavy rainfall. Although nothing got damaged, stagnant water remained and they had to move the guitar cab to his bedroom. They recorded the drums upstairs at The Bodega in Nottingham then Rolo Tomassi then went to James and Eva Spence's parents house record the vocals, keyboard and pianos.

== Musical style ==
Rolo Tomassi – Ex Luna Scientia
The album's debut single 'Ex Luna Scientia' is an example of how the band uses "explosive riff bursts" and has been described as "straight from a horror movie "before effortlessly melting into a beautiful synth-laden bridge". The song has been used to represent how the album projects each element of songs more clearly "rather than creating simply a cacophony of noise."

Rolo Tomassi – Illuminare
Astraea's final track 'Illuminare' is seen as an epic closer and has been described as a combination of abrasive industrial guitars, heavenly shoe gaze and verges on post-metal.

It's a lot more direct, 'Cosmology' had to be listened to a few times to be digested, whereas this is hard hitting straight away and much more immediate. We've built on the more melodic bits and I wanted to give Eva more of a chance to bring in her clean vocals. I hope it's the kind of record that people who were already into our band still like, but also brings new people in who haven't got into us before.

— James Spence in an interview in 2012.

Much like the band's previous work Astraea is considered primarily as mathcore. This is displayed in the theoretical complexity of their music, such as odd time signatures like 9/13, polyrhythmic drumming and use of dynamics, akin to bands such as Converge, Radiohead and Sigur Rós. Their sound is seen as a "stylistic schism" between "Dillinger Escape Plan-esque tech-metalcore, grandstanding prog rock and modish synthesised pop" and fusing aesthetics from shoegaze, space rock, ambient, black metal, hardcore punk, jazz, pop, progressive rock and techno. The band is noted for their two vocalists who use both screaming and singing vocals, and the album is described as featuring more 'clean vocals' than previous albums. The band's vocal diversity is said to: "immediately creates a rich and textured sonic world". Eva has been seen as pushing her vocals "further than ever before, displaying extremity, contrasted with canorous beauty", with her singing voice being compared to the dream pop stylings of Grimes and Cocteau Twins. When Eva Spence has been asked about the album's musical approach, is much more 'hard-hitting' and 'more direct' than previous albums. She was quoted saying that the album is much more accessible than their previous albums: "You can get your teeth into it much quicker, people who didn't have patience before with our music before will be into this record. It's still technical, but we're using the mathy bits more sparingly."

The album opens out with 'Howl', a grinding, but graceful opener. The song starts with an opening two minutes of intense and spacious drone synthesisers. The following two minutes of the song break into "unrelenting and brutal" mathcore with Eva Spence making her vocal debut with her "gleefully guttural vocal register". The song is used as an example of how the band is using more complex, but 'more rewarding' song structures in their music. ‘Ex Luna Scientia’, the opening single for the album is seen as a more expansive and more melodic song in comparison to their previous work, placing emphasis on Eva Spence's singing rather than her trademark 'guttural' style. Rock Sound reviewer Oliver Robertson used the song as an example for the sonic development of the album as it is "more focused on making each element stand out now, rather than creating simply a cacophony of noise." The introduction to 'Empiresk' is seen as being "completely caked in reverb" and ends with a stoner riff. The "sparse piano chords" that open both 'Empiresk' and 'Prelude II', among the atmospheric breaks that are featured on other tracks on the album defy the aggression featured on the rest of Astraea. Songs like 'The Scales of Balance', 'Remancer' and 'Gloam' are seen as having a familiar style to the Rolo Tomassi's previous work. 'Gloam', specifically the last half of the song, showcases a "battle between melodic keyboard[s] and screamed vocals with a real sense of urgency and threat." 'Remancer' specifically has been considered as almost like Mastodon. The album closes with 'Illuminare', a song which Metal Hammer reviewer Merlin Alderslade cites as showing Radiohead and Sigur Rós influences.

Lyrically, Eva Spence credited on how the Astraea was a lot more positive than their previous material due to having time off between tours and being able to relax in the writing process. "I feel happier than I have done in the past few years. I'm seeing things in a positive light and I hope the lyrics will be more uplifting" In an interview with James Spence about the early writing process and how the lyrics have an essence of self-reflection as a common theme in the band's work, "it's not something people normally look at or focus on; self-reflection as a theme, but if you ignore what's happening to you and how it's making you think about things then I don't think that's good."

== Release and promotion ==
In early February 2012, Rolo Tomassi announced the release of a new single: 'Old Mystics'. 'Old Mystics' and its B-side 'Mesmerizer' was written by synthesiser play James Spence in the earliest stages of the Astraea's writing, in late 2011. The single was uploaded to the band's Facebook profile to stream for free. They released the single on 26 March. The band announced a few days after releasing "Old Mystics" for streaming that it will most likely not appear on the new album and will just be a stand-alone single as they felt the two songs did not fit onto Astraea. Rolo Tomassi completed their first tour of the year as the main support for Architects on a 14-date UK tour in April. They used this tour to promote their new single 'Old Mystics' as well as debut other unrecorded new material from the album, such as songs 'Howl' and 'Remancer'. Rolo Tomassi's presence on the tour was met with positive reception; however, reviewers believed the band's music was too aggressive and chaotic for fans of Architects. Tim Sewell when writing for The Courier Online said that: "it was apparent that much of the crowd (mostly Architects fans) were left a little confused by singer/shewolf Eva Spence, who flung herself about in front of them screaming."

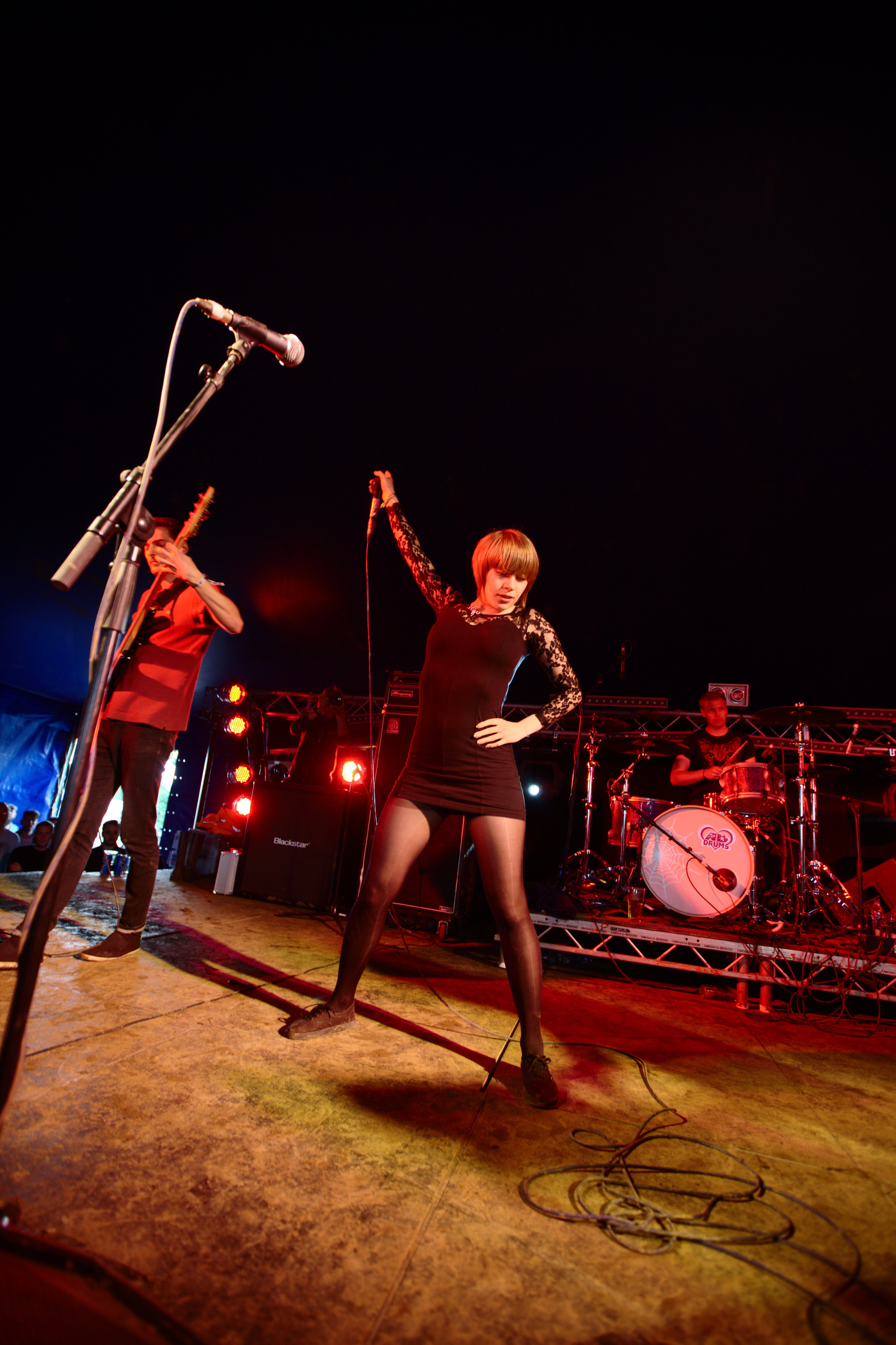
Rolo Tomassi performing in 2012. During the promotion for Astraea the band learned that some songs- particularly 'Gloam'- were difficult to play live.

The album's release date was delayed several times. Kerrang! magazine initially announced that Astraea was expected to be released in May. But by April the album was then declared as being released in October. On 16 August 2012, the band issued both the track listing for the album its title, Astraea and unveiled its British release date as 5 November. Before the Astraea's release, they completed an October tour of Britain with support from Oathbreaker and Goodtime Boys and then went on to support the album in Europe in November 2012 which, as a tour was 24 shows in 26 days. One music video and one single spawned out of the release of Astraea. The single was 'Ex Luna Scientia' which was released in September 2012. The music video was for 'Howl' and was released in early March 2013.

The aims of Astraea, in James Spence's mind, was to help reach parts of the world they've been unable to tour, like North America and South-east Asia as well as desiring to tour and support the album all of 2013. The band learned their studio output was not as easy to re-create live as it was with previous albums. An example was with the song 'Gloam' as the pedal changes were too rapid for live performances.

The band completed a small British tour in January 2013, but in May that year Rolo Tomassi completed another short British tour with Bastions, the band was noted for only costing five-pound a ticket for all venues. They picked Bastions as they were aware of them because of their mutual relationship with Holy Roar Records and how their bassist played in Crocus, a band which has played with Rolo Tomassi in the past. Rolo Tomassi's decision of making the shows of the tour only cost five-pound was questioned by interviewer Samantha Booth when writing for The National Student, James replied saying it was for the sake of encouraging people to come see them and because of the high prices of concert tickets. The band has hinted that their touring schedule would go "further afield" than Europe. In September Rolo Tomassi performed on three out of the four dates of the Japanese touring festival Reverberation Festival. In September and October, starting just three days after their Japanese performances Rolo Tomassi completed 13 date tour of Australia with Australian bands Totally Unicorn and Stockades. It is the first time the band has been in the country since 2010.

== Reception ==
=== Critical reception ===
Professional ratings
Review scores
Source	Rating
BBC	(favourable)
Drowned in Sound	(8/10)
The Fly	4/5 stars
Metal Hammer	(Favourable)
NME	(8/10)
The Quietus	(favourable)
Rock Sound	(7/10)

The album received critical acclaim from popular critics. BBC issued a very much favourable review of the album as writer Noel Gardner praised Rolo Tomassi as remaining a "remarkably singular band" three albums into their career. Drowned in Sound writer Pieter Macmillan commented positively on their use of vocals on the album saying "having male and female vocals and the ability to switch from singing to screaming and back again immediately creates a rich and textured sonic world if it’s done well, as it certainly is here."

The Fly magazine gave the album a four out of five star rating summarising the album as "blissed-out ecstasy". New Musical Express writer Barry Nicolson gave the album an 8 out of 10 and drew parallels between the album titles name, being derived from the Greek goddess of justice by concluding his review with "If there is any justice in the world, here’s an album richly deserving of some." Metal Hammer reviewers praised the album for its increase in 'clean vocals' and less disjointed song writing but still being heavy.

John Doran of online magazine The Quietus gave the album a glowing review expecting it to appear in his publicationsend of year lists, describing it in summary as a triumph: "Rolo Tomassi are miles ahead of the game not just because they are constantly trying to break new ground but also because they have entered a nuclear arms race of progressiveness with their own back catalogue." Oliver Robertson when writing for Rock Sound magazine gave the album a 7 out of 10 and started his review by praising the band saying "deviating little from the blueprint while making some of the finest mathcore albums of the past few years". Considering the album as a sign of Rolo Tomassi maturing as a band.

=== Accolades ===
The album earned numerous best-of lists in 2012. Appearing on Rock Sounds top 50 at 47, The Quietus at number 62 out of 75, Kerrang! scored the album at 35 out of 101 and Ourzone at number 22 out of 25

== Track listing ==
No.	Title	Length
1.	"Howl"	4:39
2.	"Ex Luna Scientia"	3:58
3.	"The Scales of Balance"	3:34
4.	"Remancer"	1:49
5.	"Empiresk"	4:00
6.	"Prelude II (Echolalia)"	1:03
7.	"Echopraxia"	3:16
8.	"Gloam"	3:32
9.	"Illunis"	4:51
10.	"Illuminare"	7:36

== Personnel ==
=== Rolo Tomassi ===
- Eva Spence – lead vocals
- James Spence – synthesizers and co-lead vocals
- Edward Dutton – drum kit
- Chris Cayford – electric guitar
- Nathan Fairweather – electric bass guitar

=== Additional personnel ===
- Jason Sanderson – production
