= Summer Tour =

Summer Tour may refer to:

== Concert tours ==
- Summer Tour (Depeche Mode), 1994
- Summer Tour 2004 (Blink-182 and No Doubt)
- Summer Tour (Paul McCartney), 2004
- Summer Tour (Erykah Badu), 2006
- Summer Tour (Elena Paparizou), 2008
- Summer Tour 2008 (Tiësto and Armani Exchange)
- Summer Tour 2009 (Chickenfoot)
- Summer Tour (Demi Lovato), 2009
- 2009 Summer Tour (No Doubt)
- 2011 Summer Tour (Maroon 5 and Train), 2011
- Summer Tour (Mika), 2011
- Summer Tour (Jennifer Lopez), 2012
- Summer Tour (Miranda Cosgrove), 2012
- Summer Tour (Big Time Rush and Victoria Justice), 2013
- Summer Tour (Bridgit Mendler), 2013
- 2013 Summer Tour (Matchbox Twenty and Goo Goo Dolls)
- 2013 Summer Tour (Toni Braxton)
- Summer Tour (Lana Del Rey), 2015
- Summer Tour (Celine Dion), 2016
- Summer Tour 2016 (Weezer and Panic! at the Disco)

== Albums ==
- Summer Tour 2007, an EP by Rolo Tomassi – see Rolo Tomassi discography
- Summer Tour 2007 Final Time – Kotoba no Chikara, a 2007 video EP by Arashi
- 2010 Summer Tour EP, a 2010 EP by Paramore

== Film ==
- Summer Tour (film), a documentary about Deadheads (2025)
