= Eternal youth (disambiguation) =

Eternal youth is the concept of immortality free of aging.

It can also refer to:

- Eternal Youth (Future Bible Heroes album), 2002
- Eternal Youth (Rolo Tomassi album), 2011
- Eternal Youth, an 1886 novel by Leopold von Sacher-Masoch
- Eternal Youth, official name of the statue Golden Boy, atop the Manitoba Legislative Building
- Eternal Youth, a thoroughbred horse, winner of the 1968 Hill Stakes
- "No. 29 (Eternal Youth)", a song from the 1971 album Smash Your Head Against the Wall by John Entwistle
- "Eternal Youth", a 1990 episode of Peter Pan and the Pirates
- "Eternal Youth" (Batman: The Animated Series), a 1992 episode of Batman: the Animated Series

== See also ==
- Indefinite lifespan
- Tír na nÓg, the Land of Eternal Youth in Irish mythology
