= I Was a Cub Scout =

Two-piece synth-pop/indie rock band

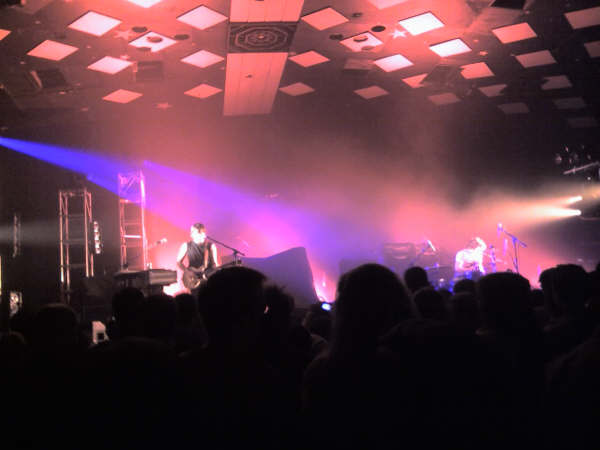

Background information
- Origin: Nottingham, England
- Genres: Indie rock, pop
- Years active: June 2005–July 2008
- Label: Abeano XL
- Past members: Todd Marriott; William Bowerman
- Website: iwasacubscout.bandcamp.com

I Was a Cub Scout were a two-piece synth-pop/indie rock band from Nottingham, England, consisting of Todd Marriott (vocals, synthesizers, guitar, formerly of Through Winter) and William Bowerman (drums, formerly of Sixteen Hours). The band started in 2005, and split in July 2008.

== History ==
Marriott started the project in June 2005, becoming a band with the addition of Bowerman in 2006. After releasing their first single they were signed to XL Recordings label Abeano. "Pink Squares" was released in November 2006, and followed in 2007 with "I Hate Nightclubs" and "Our Smallest Adventures".

A compilation of tracks from the band's early singles, Iwasacubscout, was released in 2007. The band's first album proper, I Want You To Know That There Is Always Hope, was released in February 2008, preceded by a new version of "Pink Squares", released as a double A-side with "Echoes", which peaked at no. 71 on the UK Singles Chart. The album was well received by critics, with Stewart Mason of AllMusic calling it "ultra-catchy synth pop", and the NME commenting on "positive songwriting which makes life that little more liveable". PopMatters' Andrew Martin called it "a damn fine effort worthy of a listen". The tour to promote the album was interrupted after Marriott was hit in the face with a glass at their concert in Southampton.

The duo added James Spence of Rolo Tomassi, Daniel Mothers of Reno Dakota + Franko Fraize and Sam Hudson of Youth Movies as touring members. Follow up single "The Hunter's Daughter" was withdrawn prior to release after the band announced their split in June 2008, citing "countless problems over the past year or so", although they continued to complete their UK tour into the following month.

== Post-split activities ==
Since the split, both former members have created new bands. Todd Marriott has formed YGT, an electronic duo with Tom Mclean.

Immediately after IWACS split, Bowerman formed the instrumental band Brontide. Bowerman also plays live and also session drums for La Roux and is tour drummer for Summer Camp and Paul Mullen (of yourcodenameis:milo) also announced on his Twitter that he had been recording with Will and Gordon Moakes of Bloc Party.

== Discography ==
=== Studio albums ===
- I Want You to Know That There Is Always Hope (2008), Abeano

=== Compilations ===
- Iwasacubscout (2007), Abeano

=== Singles ===
Year	A-side	B-side(s)	UK Singles Chart	Release date
2006	"That's Not a Crate, That's a Box of Heaven"	"Part Two"	-	4 September 2006
2006	"Pink Squares"	"Teenage Skin"	119	27 November 2006
2007	"I Hate Nightclubs"	"Oh What a Fiasco!"	116	12 March 2007
2007	"Our Smallest Adventures"	"Our Smallest Adventures" (GoodBooks remix)	-	3 September 2007
2008	"Pink Squares"	"Echoes (live)"	71	4 February 2008
2008	"The Hunter's Daughter"	"Worker Bees", "Close to Me"	-	16 June 2008
