= Astraea (disambiguation) =

Astraea is a Greek goddess. Astraea may also refer to:

- Astraea (gastropod), a genus of sea snails
- Astraea (plant), a genus of plants in the family Euphorbiaceae
- Astraea (nuclear warhead) - planned British thermonuclear warhead
- 5 Astraea, asteroid
- a synonym for Croton (plant), a gymnosperm plant genus of Rushfoil
- HMS Astraea, a name for warships reused by the Royal Navy
- Astraea-class cruiser, a Royal Navy ship class
- Astraia, the ancient Greek name of the city of Radoviš in modern North Macedonia
- ASTRAEA (aerospace), UK UAV programme
- Astraea (album), album by Rolo Tomassi, 2012
- Astraea Lesbian Foundation for Justice, an LGBT foundation based in the United States

== See also ==
- Astrea (disambiguation)
- Astrée (disambiguation)
- Asteria (disambiguation)
