= I Want You to Know That There Is Always Hope =

Studio album by I Was a Cub Scout
- Released: 18 February 2008
- Recorded: 2007
- Genre: Indie rock
- Length: 48:25
- Label: Abeano XL
- Producer: Hugh Padgham

I Want You to Know That There Is Always Hope is the only studio album by British indie rock band I Was a Cub Scout and was released on 18 February 2008. The album was produced by Hugh Padgham and released on the XL Recordings label Abeano.

== Track listing ==
1. "Save Your Wishes" - 3:44
2. "Echoes" - 3:38
3. "Lucean" - 4:43
4. "Pink Squares" - 4:15
5. "Part 3" - 4:28
6. "We Were Made to Love" - 4:15
7. "Our Smallest Adventures" - 4:46
8. "Recommendations" - 3:44
9. "The Hunter's Daughter" - 4:29
10. "P's and Q's" - 4:56
11. "A Step Too Far Behind" - 5:27

== Reception ==
Professional ratings
Review scores
Source	Rating
AllMusic	3.5/5 stars
Bournemouth Echo	3/5 stars
Drowned in Sound	6/10 stars
Gigwise.com	8/10 stars
The Guardian	3/5 stars
The List	3/5 stars
NME	7/10 stars
The Skinny	3/5 stars

The album was generally well received by critics. Gigwise.com gave it 8/10, calling it "a monument to growing up and dealing with the tribulations of life and love". The NME commenting on "positive songwriting which makes life that little more liveable". Stewart Mason of AllMusic called it "ultra-catchy synth pop", while PopMatters' Andrew Martin called it "a damn fine effort worthy of a listen". The Bournemouth Echo's Nick Churchill gave it three stars, calling it "a curious blend of angular indie gritpop and infuriatingly bold beats that suggest emotional forces are at work". Drowned in Sound gave it 6/10. The Skinny's Tobias Kahn also gave it three stars. Doug Johnstone, reviewing for The List, also gave it three stars, commenting: "Whispery, sensitive vocals, sweeping guitars and minor chord choruses full of obscure wordage abound, and while it’s all nice enough, it seems a little empty at its heart." Maddy Costa, for The Guardian, gave it 3/5.
