= Where Myth Becomes Memory =

Studio album by Rolo Tomassi
- Released: 4 February 2022
- Studio: The Ranch Production House, Southampton, UK; Brady St. Recordings, Waldwick, New Jersey; Vintage Keys Studio, Lockerly, UK
- Genre: Mathcore; post-metal; progressive metal; metalcore
- Length: 48:14
- Label: MNRK Heavy
- Producer: Lewis Johns

Rolo Tomassi chronology
Time Will Die and Love Will Bury It (2018)	Where Myth Becomes Memory (2022)

Where Myth Becomes Memory is the sixth studio album by British mathcore band Rolo Tomassi, released on 4 February 2022 by MNRK Heavy.

== Background and recording ==
The album has been described by the band as the final part in an 'unintended trilogy', following on from Grievances and Time Will Die and Love Will Bury It.

Lead vocalist Eva Korman moved to New Jersey two years before the album's recording - due to the COVID-19 pandemic, this meant that she was unable to travel to the UK to record. Instead, her vocals were recorded remotely at a studio in Waldwick, with the rest of the band recording their tracks at The Ranch in Southampton.

== Reception ==
At Metacritic, which assigns a rating out of 100 to reviews from mainstream critics, Where Myth Becomes Memory received an average score of 84, based on 4 reviews, indicating "universal acclaim".

DIY gave the album 4.5 stars out of 5, calling it "another truly original triumph".

Kerrang! gave the album a score of 4/5, saying that "it is a record that mesmerises without compromise, and which could not have come from anyone else".

Professional ratings
Aggregate scores
Source	Rating
Metacritic	84/100
Review scores
Source	Rating
DIY	4.5/5 stars
Kerrang!	4/5 stars

== Track listing ==
All lyrics are written by Eva Korman and James Spence; all music is composed by Rolo Tomassi.

No.	Title	Length
1.	"Almost Always"	6:30
2.	"Cloaked"	3:54
3.	"Mutual Ruin"	5:14
4.	"Labyrinthine"	3:26
5.	"Closer"	5:15
6.	"Drip"	5:50
7.	"Prescience"	4:54
8.	"Stumbling"	2:50
9.	"To Resist Forgetting"	4:04
10.	"The End of Eternity"	6:12
Total length:		48:14

== Personnel ==
Credits adapted from the liner notes of Where Myth Becomes Memory.

=== Rolo Tomassi ===
- Eva Korman – lead vocals
- James Spence – electronic keyboards, piano and co-lead vocals
- Chris Cayford – electric guitar
- Nathan Fairweather – electric bass guitar
- Al Pott – drum kit

=== Additional personnel ===
- Lewis Johns – production, mixing, horn arrangement on 'Prescience'
- Mikhail Marinas - additional engineering
- Grant Berry – mastering
- Simon Moody – art, design
