= Astrea =

Astrea may refer to:

- Astrea, an alternate spelling of the ancient Greek goddess Astraea
- Alternate spelling of 5 Astraea, an asteroid discovered in 1845
- Astrea: Six-Sided Oracles, a 2023 video game
- Astrea, Cesar, a municipality in the department of Cesar, Colombia
- ASTREA, an acronym for the Aerial Support To Regional Enforcement Agencies unit of the San Diego County Sheriff's Office
- Astrea, a leading protagonist of the 1978 Filmation animated television series, Space Sentinels
- Astrea, the pseudonym used by writer Aphra Behn
- Astrea (coral), a genus of corals from the Merulinidae family
- Astrea placata, a Russian opera by Tommaso Traetta
- Astrea Redux, a poem by John Dryden
- HMS Astrea, one of several vessels, primarily frigates, of the Royal Navy
- Il ritorno di Astrea, a poem by Vincenzo Monti
- USS Astrea (SP-560), a United States Navy patrol boat in commission from 1917 to 1919 or 1920
- Astrea, West End, a heritage-listed house in Queensland, Australia
- A.S.D. Astrea, an association football club based in Rome

== See also ==
- Astraea (disambiguation)
- Astrée (disambiguation)
- Asteria (disambiguation)
