= Brontide =

British instrumental rock band

- Origin: United Kingdom
- Genres: Instrumental rock
- Years active: 2008–2017, 2024–
- Labels: Holy Roar
- Past members: William Bowerman; Nathan Fairweather; Tim Hancock

Brontide is a British instrumental rock band formed in 2008, featuring members who were also members of I Was a Cub Scout, La Roux, Rolo Tomassi, and Dua Lipa's band. They released two albums before splitting up in 2017. In August 2024, the band reformed and released new material.

== History ==
Formed in 2008, and taking their name from the term for the 'rumbling of distant thunder', the band comprised former I Was a Cub Scout drummer William Bowerman, bass guitarist Nathan Fairweather, and guitarist Tim Hancock. Bowerman also drummed with La Roux and Summer Camp during his time in the band. The band's first release was "Bob Munden" on the Holy Monsters EP, a split release with Holy Ghost, The Tupolev Ghost, and Shapes.

The band's debut album, Sans Souci, was released in 2011, and was well-received by critics.

Fairweather joined Rolo Tomassi in 2012, while remaining a member of Brontide.

Brontide's second album Artery was released in 2014. Mike Diver, reviewing the album for Clash, described the album as "wholly bracing, carefully nuanced". DIY gave it three stars, with Nathan Roberts calling it "both inherently melodic and genre-spanning".

Bowerman joined Dua Lipa's band, and Hancock began recording as Mirror Manor. With the band members' other commitments limiting the time they could devote to the band, they announced that they had split up in April 2017.

In August 2024, the band published on their official Instagram account, that they had reformed, and are recording new material.

The band's music is described as math rock, progressive rock, post-rock and post-hardcore, with critics drawing comparisons with Battles and Russian Circles.

== Discography ==
=== Albums ===
- Sans Souci (2011), Holy Roar
- Artery (2014), Holy Roar/Pink Mist

=== EPs ===
- Brontide EP (2009), Holy Roar

=== Singles ===
- "Bob Munden" (2009), Holy Roar/Big Scary Monsters - on Holy Monsters split EP
- "Coloured Tongues" (2012), Holy Roar
- "Mineral" (2024)
