= Asteria (disambiguation) =

Asteria may refer to:

- Asteria (community), a planned Storyliving by Disney community in Pittsboro, North Carolina
- Asteria (gemology) or Star stone, a gemstone that exhibits Asterism
- Asteria (mythology), any one of various female figures in Greek mythology
- Asteria (band), an American band
- ASTERIA (spacecraft), a miniaturized space telescope
- Asteria Medievale, a medieval music ensemble
- Asteria Regio, a region on the planet Venus
- asteria (singer), a singer based in Poland and born in New Zealand

== See also ==
- Asterism
- Asterias, a genus of sea star
- Astraea (disambiguation)
- Astrea (disambiguation)
- Astrée (disambiguation)
