= USS Astrea =

Patrol vessel of the United States Navy

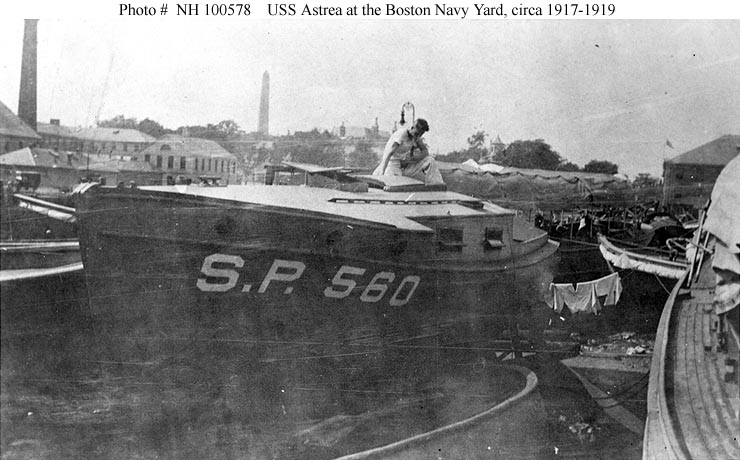
- USS Astrea (SP-560) at the Boston Navy Yard in Boston, Massachusetts, sometime between 1917 and 1919.

History

United States
- Name: USS Astrea
- Namesake: Previous name retained
- Builder: Rood and Benner
- Completed: 1916
- Acquired: 17 June 1917
- Commissioned: 27 June 1917
- Stricken: 31 March 1920
- Fate: Sold 31 March 1920
- Notes: Operated as civilian motorboat Astrea 1916-1917

General characteristics
- Type: Patrol vessel
- Tonnage: 12 gross register tons
- Length: 35 ft 0 in (10.67 m)
- Beam: 8 ft 6 in (2.59 m)
- Draft: 3 ft 0 in (0.91 m) forward
- Speed: 8.0 knots
- Complement: 6
- Armament: 1 × machine gun; 1 × Y-gun

USS Astrea (SP-560) was a United States Navy patrol vessel in commission from 1917 to 1919 or 1920.

Astrea was built as a private motorboat of the same name by Rood and Benner in 1916. On 7 June 1917, the U.S. Navy enrolled her for use as a section patrol boat in World War I, and her owner, Ralph DeConta of East Boston, Massachusetts, delivered her to the Navy on 17 June 1917. She was commissioned as USS Astrea (SP-560) on 27 June 1917.

Astrea was assigned to duty at the Boston Navy Yard in Boston, Massachusetts, where she served as the engineer officer's boat into the spring of 1918.

In May 1918, Astrea was shipped across the Atlantic Ocean to France as deck cargo aboard the troop transport USS Leviathan (ID-1326). In France, she served at Brest as a tender to troop transports through the end of World War I and apparently into the first half of 1919.

Sources differ on Astrea's career from mid-1919. She may have been carried back to the United States as deck cargo aboard the Naval Overseas Transportation Service cargo ship USS Teresa (ID-4478) in June 1919, although she may also have been serving on aviation support duties at Brest as late as October 1919.

Eventually, Astrea did return to the United States, where she was sold to S. P. Greenlee of Baltimore, Maryland, on 31 March 1920. She presumably was stricken from the Navy List the same day.
