= 4 Track Cassette =

- The white tape wrapped in blue paper with a button release

Demo album by Rolo Tomassi
- Released: 2005
- Recorded: 2005
- Genre: Punk jazz
- Label: danger!laser!phaser!razor!

Rolo Tomassi chronology
| 3 Track Demo (2005) | 4 Track Cassette (2005) | Rolo Tomassi / Mirror! Mirror! Split (2006) |

4 Track Cassette is the second demo by British mathcore band Rolo Tomassi. It was recorded at Ghost Town Studios in Leeds by Ross Halden at the end of June 2005. It was the band's first release through "Danger! Laser! Phaser! Razor!" and due to its limited availability it had sold out very soon after its release. In total there are 200 tapes and a variation of different styles of packaging.

Packaging styles:

- 30 Black tapes in a draw-string cloth bag
- 30 White tapes in a draw-string cloth bag
- 70 Black tapes wrapped in blue paper with a button
- 70 White tapes wrapped in blue paper with a button

Released on DLPR Records 22 July 2005

== Track listing ==
Also referred to as One Hundred and Seventy One

1. "Codes Within Codes"
2. "From Ambience To Ambulance"
3. "Hiroshima 8.16am"
4. "A Cosmic Accident"

== Personnel ==
- Edward Dutton – drum kit
- Joe Nicholson – electric guitar
- Eva Spence – lead vocals
- James Spence – synthesizers and co-lead vocals
- Joseph Thorpe – electric bass guitar
