= Astrée =

Astrée may refer to:

- Astraea, a Greek goddess
- L'Astrée, a novel by Honoré d'Urfé or its main character
- Astrée run-time error analyzer, a tool for static program analysis
- Astrée (record label), a record label founded by Michel Bernstein
- Astrée (Collasse), an opera by Pascal Collasse
- Astrée (Typeface), a Deberny & Peignot typeface
- French ship Astrée, a number of ships of the French Navy
- Astree, AsTree in English, a new born nation and system based on the Value Duology books by Olivier Rochet a.k.a. Prince Olivier of Astree

== See also ==
- Astraea (disambiguation)
- Astrea (disambiguation)
- Asteria (disambiguation)
