= Time Will Die and Love Will Bury It =

Studio album by Rolo Tomassi
- Released: 2 March 2018
- Recorded: 2017
- Studio: The Ranch, Southampton, UK
- Genre: Mathcore; post-rock; experimental rock
- Length: 53:04
- Label: Holy Roar
- Producer: Lewis Johns

Rolo Tomassi chronology
Grievances (2015)	Time Will Die and Love Will Bury It (2018)	Where Myth Becomes Memory (2022)

Time Will Die and Love Will Bury It is the fifth studio album by British mathcore band Rolo Tomassi, released on 2 March 2018 by Holy Roar Records.

== Background and recording ==
Synthesiser player and vocalist, James Spence had stated in interviews he wanted to make a "clean break" from the "dark, monochromatic" style of their 2015 album Grievances. He said that "I felt like I’d overcome everything that we'd written within that record. For me, it was about moving forwards and taking things to a slightly happier place".

Time Will Die and Love Will Bury It was recorded, like their previous album Grievances, at The Ranch in Southampton. James Spence noted how during the writing when other band members were producing a lot of ideas, Cayford was struggling to output similar amounts. However this frustration manifested in the song "Rituals" and helped him to push past. Guitarist Chris Cayford's and drummer Tom Pitts' system of developing music was that Cayford would send Pitts a MIDI file with his guitar work with ideas for drumming he wanted to go with it. Pitts said in an interview how he would experiment on music software such as Cubase and have ambitious ideas that he struggled to play, "I’ll write something ridiculously impossible, try to play it and then have to dumb it down a bit. We go back and forth. A lot of it is done on MIDI where I can get it exact and then learn it from there".

The title of the album Time Will Die and Love Will Bury It is derived from a poem by Richard Brautigan.

== Composition ==
The title of the album Time Will Die and Love Will Bury It has been an ambiguously interpreted statement by different members of the band which has influenced diverse song writing- while James Spence saw it as a positive title, Chris Cayford saw its darker connotations. The music of the album has been described as mathcore, post-rock, experimental rock, with heavy elements of ambient music.

== Release and promotion ==
Rolo Tomassi had a minimal tour schedule in 2017 which featured appearances at the Two Thousand Trees and Tech Fest festivals in the UK, unveiling new material with a promotional website, lovewillburyit.com. On 5 November 2017 the band released the first single from Time Will Die and Love Will Bury It, "Rituals", on BBC Radio 1, with a music video accompanying it the next day. A few days after the single's release, the band performed one headline show in London at The Borderline with support from label mates Conjurer, where they performed "Rituals" and "The Hollow Hour". On 12 February 2018 the second single "Aftermath" was released.

The album was released on Holy Roar Records in the United Kingdom on 2 March 2018. Prior to its release, the album was streamed on The Independent's website.

During the recording of Time Will Die and Love Will Bury It Cayford used software like Ableton Live to coordinate lights to be used during live performances to synchronise with the music. The band embarked on their first tour since the album was released in April across the UK and mainland Europe. The band performed at a series of European festivals, a six date UK tour in November with Blood Command and Cassus, then a United States tour November and December supporting The Number Twelve Looks Like You with Arsonists Get All The Girls.

== Reception ==
Professional ratings
Aggregate scores
Source	Rating
AnyDecentMusic?	7.6/10
Metacritic	92/100
Review scores
Source	Rating
DIY	4/5 stars
Drowned in Sound	8/10
Exclaim!	9/10
Kerrang!	5/5 stars
The Line of Best Fit	7.5/10
musicOMH	4.5/5 stars
NME	4/5 stars
Metal Storm	(8.5/10)

At Metacritic, which assigns a rating out of 100 to reviews from mainstream critics, Time Will Die and Love Will Bury It has received an average score of 92, based on 7 reviews, indicating "universal acclaim"; it is the second highest-scoring album of 2018 on the site.

Kerrang! gave the album a perfect score, citing it as "a classic" and "a hugely satisfying listen, with the longer songs in particular allowing the band free rein to indulge every experimental urge." NME was similar in its assessment, saying "whereas Grievances was so bleak you could feel the dull ache of its bruises, Time Will Die’s increased use of light and space ensures it stands alone in an arsenal of already exceptional records."

The Line of Best Fit gave the album a 7.5/10, concluding that "Rolo Tomassi are a band still looking to push themselves further forward creatively, while remaining just as focused on retaining the dramatic core of their sound that has long set them apart from any contemporaries."

== Track listing ==
All lyrics are written by Eva Spence and James Spence; all music is composed by Rolo Tomassi.

No.	Title	Length
1.	"Towards Dawn"	3:45
2.	"Aftermath"	3:52
3.	"Rituals"	3:25
4.	"The Hollow Hour"	7:28
5.	"Balancing the Dark"	3:59
6.	"Alma Mater"	3:11
7.	"A Flood of Light"	8:20
8.	"Whispers Among Us"	5:10
9.	"Contretemps"	8:17
10.	"Risen"	5:37
Total length:		53:04

== Personnel ==
Credits adapted from the liner notes of Time Will Die and Love Will Bury It.

=== Rolo Tomassi ===
- Eva Spence – lead vocals
- James Spence – electronic keyboards, piano and co-lead vocals
- Chris Cayford – electric guitar
- Nathan Fairweather – electric bass guitar
- Tom Pitts – drum kit and backing vocals

=== Additional personnel ===
- Lewis Johns – recording, mixing, vocals on "Aftermath"
- Dom Wright – recording, mixing
- Brad Boatright – mastering
- Simon Moody – art, design

== Charts ==
Chart performance for Time Will Die and Love Will Bury It
Chart (2018)	Peak position
UK Independent Albums (OCC)	28
UK Rock & Metal Albums (OCC)	12
