= Eternal Youth (Rolo Tomassi album) =

Compilation album by Rolo Tomassi
- Released: 18 April 2011
- Recorded: 2005 - 2009
- Genre: Mathcore; grindcore; post-metal; jazzcore
- Length: 2:03:59
- Label: Destination Moon

Rolo Tomassi chronology
Cosmology (2010)	Eternal Youth (2011)	Astraea (2012)

Professional ratings
Review scores
Source	Rating
I Heart AU	7/10 stars
Dose Of Metal	4/5 stars
Wheelscene	4/5 stars

Eternal Youth is the first compilation album by British mathcore band Rolo Tomassi. The first of these two CDs showcases their material from split extended plays and EPs, while the second disc is composed of early demos, remixes and acoustic tracks. The album was released on Destination Moon records, Rolo Tomassi's own record label. A triple vinyl version of the album was released on 16 April 2011 for Record Store Day through Holy Roar Records. The vinyl pressing was limited to 1,000 copies; 600 on black 200 on tri-colour (transparent clear/yellow/green) and 200 on grey/green.

In promotion the band made the track "Fuck The Pleasantries, Let’s Rock" free to download and stream.

== Track listing ==
Disc One

All tracks are written by Rolo Tomassi.

No.	Title	Length
1.	"Mount Celestia" (from a 2010 Hassle Records 7-inch)	7:18
2.	"Titanomachia" (from a 2010 Hassle Records 7-inch)	6:39
3.	"Pillfox" (from a 2011 Split 7-inch with Antares on Hassle Records)	2:23
4.	"The Golden Ghost" (a B-side from the Party wounds single on Hassle Records 2010)	3:14
5.	"Jealous Bones" (from a Split EP with Cancer Bats on Hassle Records 2009)	2:03
6.	"Apocalypso 2009" (from a Split EP with Fucked Up and The Bronx on Hassle Records 2009)	1:08
7.	"Digital History" (from Holy Roar Records 7-inch EP Release 2008)	1:39
8.	"Beatrotter" (from Holy Roar Records 7-inch EP Release 2008)	1:41
9.	"Film Noir" (from Rolo Tomassi EP on Holy Roar Records 2006)	1:50
10.	"Curby" (from Rolo Tomassi EP on Holy Roar Records 2006)	2:12
11.	"Cirque Du Funk" (from Rolo Tomassi EP on Holy Roar Records 2006)	4:34
12.	"Prelude" (from Rolo Tomassi EP on Holy Roar Records 2006)	1:57
13.	"Seagull" (from Rolo Tomassi EP on Holy Roar Records 2006)	5:13
14.	"...And Then The Mannequin Spoke" (from Rolo Tomassi EP Vinyl version on Holy Roar Records 2006)	2:40
15.	"C Is For Calculus" (from Rolo Tomassi EP on Holy Roar Records 2006)	7:37
16.	"Fuck The Pleasantries Let's Rock" (from a Split 7-inch with Mirror!Mirror! on Speedway Records 2006)	1:55
17.	"Apocalypso" (from a Split 7-inch with Mirror!Mirror! on Speedway Records 2006)	1:33
18.	"Rock The Pleasantries Let's Fuck" (from a Split 7-inch with Mirror!Mirror! on Speedway Records 2006)	2:58
19.	"Codes Within Codes" (from the 4 Track Cassette on Danger!Laser!Phaser!Razor! 2006)	2:56
20.	"From Ambience To Ambulance" (from the 4 Track Cassette on Danger!Laser!Phaser!Razor! 2006)	1:00
21.	"Hiroshima 8:16am" (from the 4 Track Cassette on Danger!Laser!Phaser!Razor! 2006)	2:11
22.	"A Cosmic Accident" (from the 4 Track Cassette on Danger!Laser!Phaser!Razor! 2006)	11:20
Total length:		1:15:59

Disc Two

No.	Title	Length
1.	"Breathing Through A City..."	0:34
2.	"The Tentatively Titled "Film Noir""	2:28
3.	"...And Then The Mannequin Spoke"	2:36
4.	"Headclouds/Reign Of Low" (Throats cover)	3:25
5.	"Oh, Hello Ghost" (Acoustic)	2:45
6.	"Nine" (Acoustic)	2:56
7.	"Abraxas" (Cereal Remix)	3:23
8.	"I Love Turbulence" (Three Trapped Tigers Remix)	4:00
9.	"Fuck The Pleasantries, Let's Remix" (:( Remix)	1:44
10.	"C Is For Drowning Under Waves Of Listless Apathy" (Ornine Remix)	5:49
11.	"Beatrotter" (Please Will Remix)	3:43
12.	"Tongue In Chic" (Team Wolf Remix)	4:26
13.	"Fofteen" (Dolby Anol Gets Dark Remix)	4:47
14.	"I Love Turbulence" (Rich Manu Rework)	5:48
Total length:		48:00

== Personnel ==
Rolo Tomassi

- Edward Dutton - drum kit
- Joe Nicholson - electric guitar
- Eva Spence - lead vocals
- James Spence - synthesizers and co-lead vocals
- Joseph Thorpe - electric bass guitar
