= Grievances (album) =

Studio album by Rolo Tomassi
- Released: 1 June 2015
- Studio: The Ranch, Southampton, UK
- Genre: Mathcore; experimental rock; post-rock
- Length: 39:55
- Label: Holy Roar Records (UK); Ipecac Recordings (US)

Rolo Tomassi chronology
Astraea (2012)	Grievances (2015)	Time Will Die and Love Will Bury It (2018)

Professional ratings
Aggregate scores
Source	Rating
Metacritic	79/100
Review scores
Source	Rating
Drowned in Sound	9/10
Kerrang!	4/5 stars
NME	7/10
The Quietus	favourable

Grievances is the fourth studio album by British mathcore band Rolo Tomassi. The album was released on 1 June 2015 through Holy Roar Records and Ipecac Recordings.

== Track listing ==
All lyrics are written by Eva and James Spence; all music is composed by Rolo Tomassi.

No.	Title	Length
1.	"Estranged"	2:40
2.	"Raumdeuter"	5:16
3.	"The Embers"	3:16
4.	"Prelude III (Phantoms)"	1:42
5.	"Opalescent"	4:42
6.	"Unseen and Unknown"	0:37
7.	"Stage Knives"	3:52
8.	"Crystal Cascades"	3:20
9.	"Chandelier Shiver"	2:14
10.	"Funereal"	4:57
11.	"All That Has Gone Before"	7:19
Total length:		39:55

== Personnel ==
Rolo Tomassi

- Eva Spence – vocals
- James Spence – keyboards, vocals, string arrangement (tracks 8, 9)
- Chris Cayford – guitar
- Nathan Fairweather – bass guitar
- Tom Pitts – drums, backing vocals

Additional personnel

- Andrew Stuart-Buttle – violin, viola (tracks 8, 9)
- Will Calderbank – cello (tracks 8, 9)
- Jon Desmond – string arrangement (tracks 8, 9)
- Dan Marsh – engineering
- Brad Boatright – mastering
- Lewis Johns – recording, mixing
- Simon Moody – artwork
