= Hysterics (Rolo Tomassi album) =

Studio album by Rolo Tomassi
- Released: 22 September 2008
- Recorded: 2008
- Genre: Mathcore; experimental rock; punk jazz
- Length: 43:55
- Label: Hassle
- Producer: Jason Sanderson

Rolo Tomassi chronology
Rolo Tomassi – Live @ Eurosonic EP (2008)	Hysterics (2008)	Cosmology (2010)

Professional ratings
Review scores
Source	Rating
Artrocker	link
DEAD PRESS!	link
Kerrang!	4/5 stars
Metal Hammer	8/10 stars
Rockmidgets.com	link
Rock Sound	8/10
The Skinny	link
Thrash Hits	link

Hysterics is the debut studio album by British mathcore band Rolo Tomassi, recorded in spring 2008 and released on 22 September 2008. The album is Rolo Tomassi's first release on Hassle Records and features all new tracks. The album received an exclusive first review from Thrash Hits, who awarded the album a maximum score. The band recorded a video for the song "I Love Turbulence" on 15 September.

The album was also released on heavyweight black vinyl, featuring alternative artwork, through Hassle Records and limited to only 1000 copies. The album is being repressed through Holy Roar/Destination Moon Records in two colours, Red/Clear and Blue with Yellow and Grey splatter.

On 23 November 2009, a "Bonus Disk" version of the album was released via Shock Records in Australia.

== Track listing ==
All tracks are written by Rolo Tomassi.

No.	Title	Length
1.	"Oh, Hello Ghost"	3:33
2.	"I Love Turbulence"	2:48
3.	"Fofteen"	2:45
4.	"Abraxas"	2:26
5.	"An Apology to the Universe"	1:18
6.	"Nine"	4:03
7.	"Macabre Charade"	3:48
8.	"Trojan Measures"	1:00
9.	"Everything Went Grey"	3:29
10.	"Scabs"	4:31
11.	"Fantasia"	14:21
Total length:		43:55

Bonus disk
No.	Title	Length
1.	"Digital History"
2.	"Beatrotter"
3.	"Fuck the Pleasantries, Let's Rock"
4.	"Apocalypso"
5.	"Rock the Pleasantries, Let's Fuck"
