= Cosmology (album) =

Studio album by Rolo Tomassi
- Released: 24 May 2010
- Recorded: November–December 2009
- Genre: Mathcore; experimental rock; punk jazz
- Length: 35:49
- Label: Hassle
- Producer: Diplo

Rolo Tomassi chronology
Hysterics (2008)	Cosmology (2010)	Eternal Youth (2011)

Professional ratings
Review scores
Source	Rating
BBC Music	(favourable)
The Fly	(favourable)
NME	8/10 stars
Pitchfork Media	(6.1/10)
Rock Sound	9/10 stars

Cosmology is the second studio album by British mathcore band Rolo Tomassi, released in 2010. The album was planned to be released on 19 April, but was pushed back by the record label, Hassle. The band had begun recording demos for the record in the first week of October 2009 and wasted no time in recording the tracks professionally in Los Angeles during the second and third weeks of the same month. The album was produced by Diplo.

B-sides for singles from the album include "The Golden Ghost", which was released on 28 April via the "2010 Subs Club". "Party Wounds" is the A-side to this release.

"Party Wounds" was the first song from Cosmology to have a video.

== Critical reception ==
Drowned in Sound wrote: "Refinement and creative condensation are undoubtedly strong qualities for a second album from a band as young as this, and the result is a dynamic, shape-shifting LP with charm and playability, but occasionally it feels like something is lost along the way".

== Track listing ==
All tracks are written by Rolo Tomassi.

No.	Title	Length
1.	"Katzenklavier"	1:04
2.	"Agamemnon"	1:40
3.	"House House Casanova"	1:15
4.	"Party Wounds"	3:14
5.	"Unromance"	4:03
6.	"French Motel"	2:52
7.	"Kasia"	5:31
8.	"Sakia"	3:17
9.	"Tongue in Chic"	5:11
10.	"Cosmology"	7:43
Total length:		35:49

B-sides
No.	Title	Length
11.	"The Golden Ghost"

== Packaging styles ==
Multiple variations of the album were to be released:

- CD album - Digi-pack
- CD album - Special edition screen printed and hand-numbered cardboard sleeve (includes exclusive Rolo Tomassi poster) (200 copies were made)
- 12"" LP - Translucent blue vinyl with solid white and grey speckles (100 copies made)
- 12"" LP - Translucent purple or translucent red-coloured vinyl (100 copies made)
- 12"" LP - Solid white / grey spiral coloured vinyl (300 copies made)
