= ASTRAEA =

British UAV manufacturer

- Industry: UAV
- Founded: 2006

Autonomous Systems Technology Related Airborne Evaluation & Assessment (ASTRAEA) is a project to develop unmanned aerial vehicles (UAV) to fly in civil airspace. Both UK government agencies and companies such as AOS Group, BAE Systems, Qinetiq, Rolls-Royce plc, Cassidian, Cobham plc, EADS and Thales UK are involved. The project began in 2006.

Currently, UAVs can only operate in UK airspace under restricted conditions.

ParcAberporth has a centre dedicated to ASTRAEA. Permission has been sought for a permanent segregated airspace around ParcAberporth for testing UAVs over land.

Concerns about safety, privacy and noise were raised during consultative sessions.

== Test Flights ==
Test flights were performed, between May and September 2012, over the Irish Sea. A Jetstream aircraft is being as a UAV and a Piper Seneca as an 'intruder' to test the sense and avoid systems.

In April 2013 the first unmanned flight over British airspace was successfully completed when BAE Systems flew a Jetstream 31 from Warton Aerodrome, on the Fylde near Preston to Inverness in Scotland. The aircraft, described as the "flying test bed" was controlled by a pilot at Warton using advanced sensors and on-board robotic systems. The flight was not strictly "unmanned" as two pilots flew in the cockpit as a precaution but they were required only to monitor the flight and not to actively engage in any flying. ASTRAEA programme director Lambert Dopping-Hepenstal said: the work being done "will likely impact all of us in the next five, 10, 20 years as unmanned aircraft and associated technology develop and become a part of everyday life". The governments business and energy minister Michael Fallon said: "We welcome this pioneering flight at the end of the ASTRAEA programme. ASTRAEA has made significant achievements, placing the UK industry in a good position globally on unmanned aircraft and the development of regulations for their civil use."
