= Rolo Tomassi =

British mathcore band

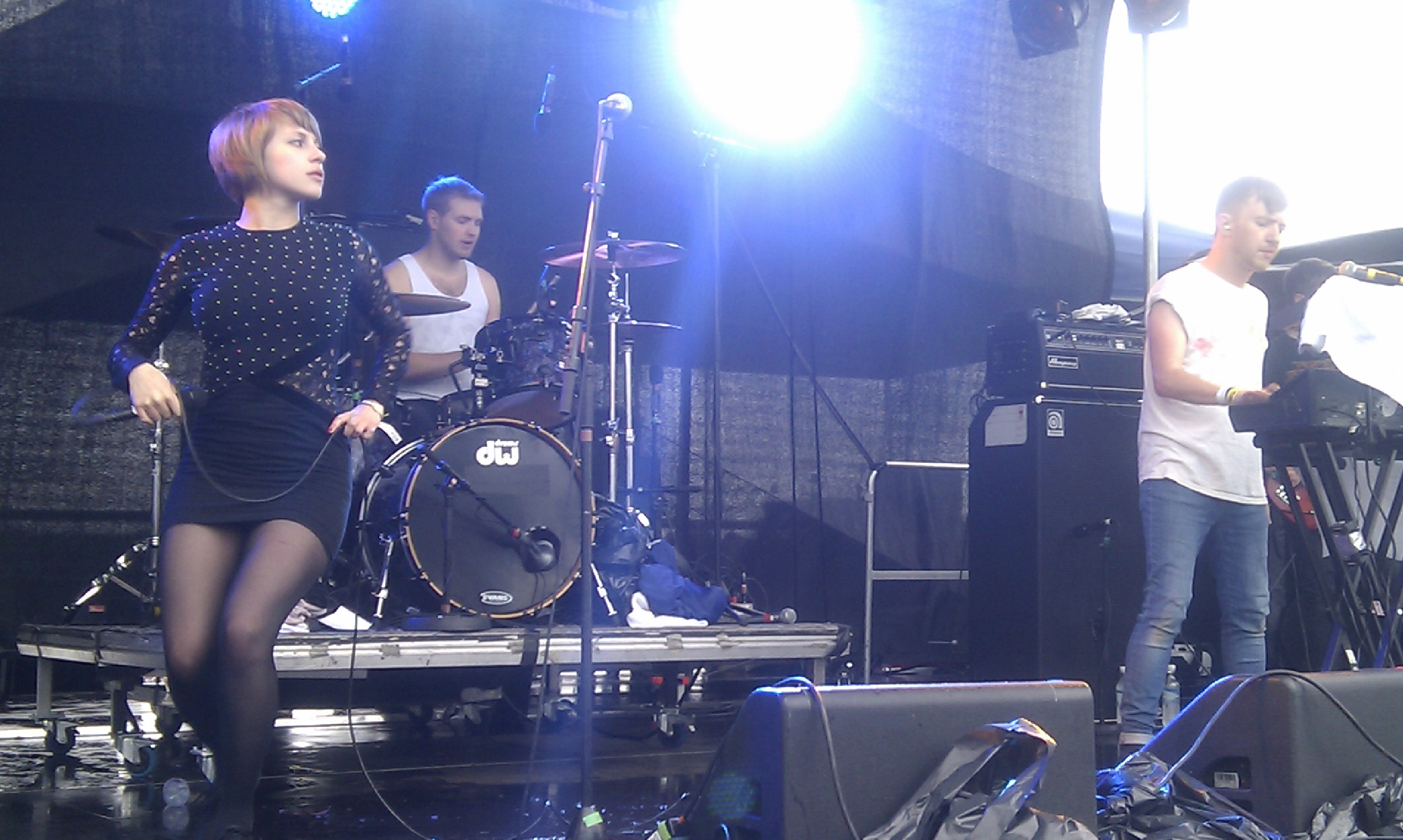
- Rolo Tomassi live at Slottsfjell Festival 2011 in Tønsberg, Norway. From left to right: Eva Korman, Edward Dutton and James Spence.

Background information
- Origin: Stocksbridge, Sheffield, England
- Genres: Mathcore; progressive metalcore; progressive rock; experimental rock; post-hardcore; post-metal
- Years active: 2005–present
- Labels: MNRK Heavy; Hassle; Destination Moon; Holy Roar; Ipecac
- Members: Eva Korman; James Spence; Chris Cayford; Nathan Fairweather; Al Pott
- Past members: Joseph Thorpe; Joe Nicholson; Edward Dutton; Tom Pitts

Rolo Tomassi are a British mathcore band formed in Sheffield in 2005. Their name is a reference to dialogue from the film L.A. Confidential. The band are known for their chaotic style and performances, and strong DIY ethic. They are currently signed to MNRK Heavy.

The band released two albums on Hassle Records: Hysterics (2008) and the Diplo-produced Cosmology (2010). After creating their own record label in 2011 called Destination Moon, they released Eternal Youth, a compilation album of B-sides, remixes and rarities from throughout their career, and their third album Astraea, in 2012 with the first line-up change in their career. They then released two albums on Holy Roar Records: Grievances (2015) and Time Will Die and Love Will Bury It (2018), before moving to their current label to release their sixth album, Where Myth Becomes Memory (2022).

== History ==
=== Early years and the Mayday! label (2005–2008) ===
Shortly before the band formed, Eva Korman (née Spence) was in a small garage band for a few months as a keyboardist. The band was looking for an aggressive vocalist to help make it a six piece band, so Eva stepped up to give screaming a go. To practice she and her brother, James Spence, would scream in their parents' car, with very loud music on; the music was to help overcome their shyness. The two have collaborated in bands since they were both 13 years old.

Rolo Tomassi formed in February 2005 in the town of Stocksbridge, taking their name from a concept in the 1997 neo-noir film L.A. Confidential. When Rolo Tomassi formed they sought to keep the band as DIY as possible; achieving this by hand-making their first releases and organizing many DIY shows. Eva Spence went from being the keyboardist to the vocalist after they struggled to find a singer. Not long after forming, the band had written some songs and immediately began to perform at local venues/pubs to small crowds. At this time they released some of their first material on to a 3 Track Demo CD which they could sell at the shows in which they were performing. The demo CD-R was released under James Spence's (keyboardist/vocalist) independent label which he named "Mayday!". There are eight releases under this label. After a split EP with Mirror! Mirror! (limited to 333 copies and released through Speedowax) the band signed to Holy Roar Records and released a self-titled EP featuring re-recorded songs from previous demos and EPs along with new songs.

One of their first concerts was supporting Bring Me the Horizon in February 2005 at the Classic Rock Bar in Sheffield.

=== Hysterics and Cosmology (2008–2011) ===
In June 2008, Rolo Tomassi were given a spot at Download Festival. In September they released their debut album Hysterics. Supporting this release the band opened for Pulled Apart By Horses in Britain and for Jane's Addiction in the United States.

In 2009 Rolo Tomassi started their "Subs Club" series. This was a series of 7" vinyls singles released every three months with a cover track and remixes and a 7" single, Rolo Tomassi / Throats Split, jointly release with the band Throats. In February and March of that year Rolo Tomassi supported Fucked Up and The Bronx in the Shred Yr Face 2 tour. Later in this year, they performed at South by Southwest festival. This led to be an important performance in their career as they were watched by American producer Thomas Pentz, better known by his stage name Diplo, who mentioned them in a Pitchfork Media interview, when asked to name "One Obscure Band You Think Should Be More Popular". The band contacted him thinking he might do a remix for them but he responded by offering to produce their second album. The band wished to wrap their album's completion around Diplo's schedule so they wrote the album in three months.

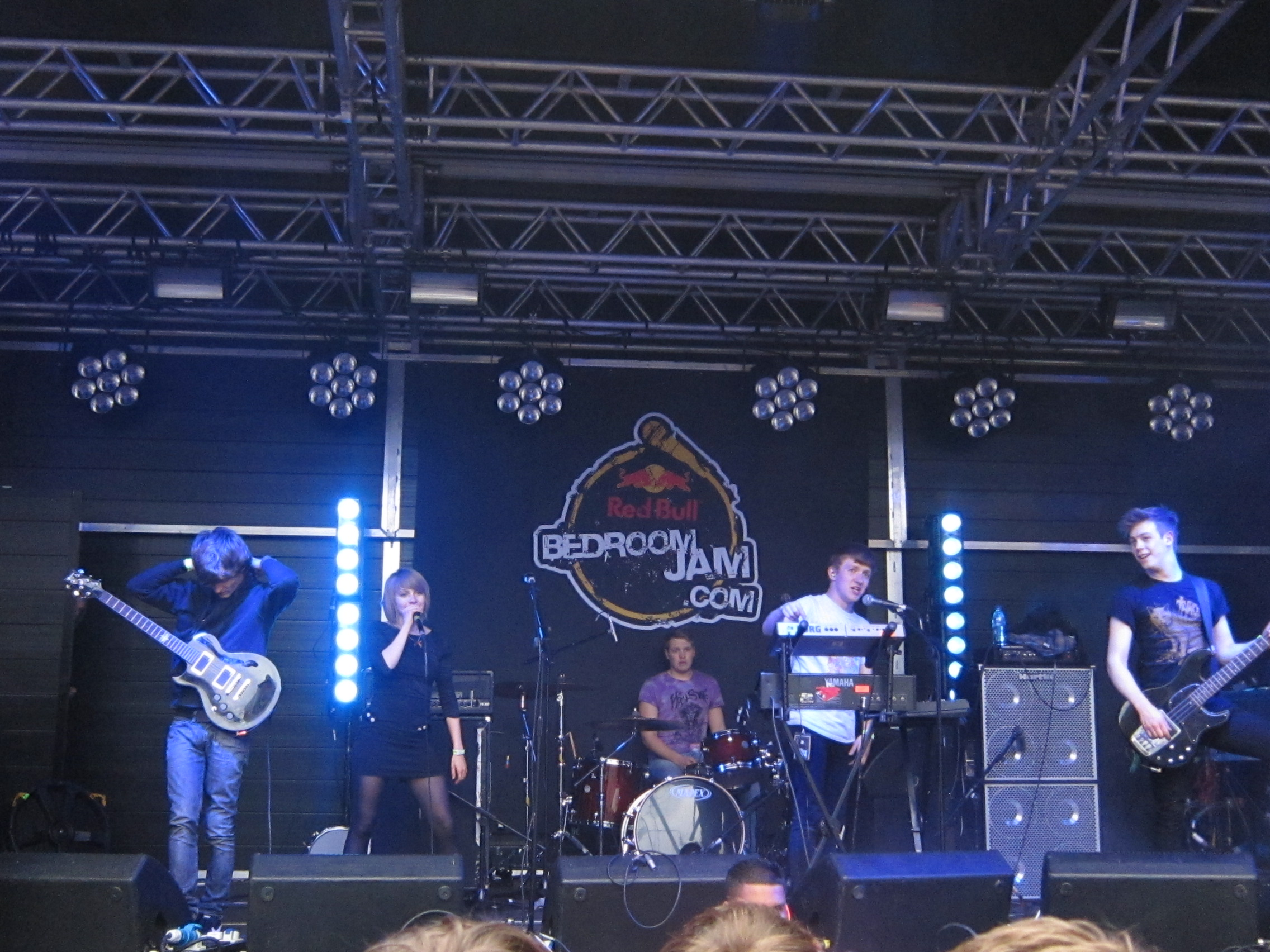
Rolo Tomassi performing at the Camden Crawl in 2010. (From left to right) Joe Nicholson, Eva Spence, Edward Dutton, James Spence and Joseph Thorpe.

Towards the end of October 2009, the band flew to Los Angeles to record their second album, in a studio which James considered "unassuming, a well hidden and fantastic place". Artwork for their second album was, like that for Hysterics, designed by Simon Moody. Recording finished on 31 October and the album, titled Cosmology was released in May 2010 was released. With a hope that Cosmology was a clear and definite progression from Hysterics James Spence felt had they corrected the short-comings of their first album. Because it was not co-written by Diplo, like with his typical projects, he helped add flourishes to the album. Diplo's influence on Eve Spence's developed vocal range has been noted. Because their producer had typically worked with female solo artists such as Bonde do Rolê, M.I.A. and Santigold, he helped cross techniques from them over to Eva. Particularly with demoing songs, where the band would write a demo and give it to Eva to sing and interpret in her own room for hours.

The band played on the Ronnie James Dio Stage at Download Festival and played on the NME/Radio 1 tent at Reading and Leeds in August 2010. James Spence commented on the Download show saying it was the biggest show of their career to date. In the band's blog in June 2010 it was written that there might eventually be a Discography styled release in the future which would l allows people to hear all of the band's material released before the Rolo Tomassi EP. On 7 August 2010 they played at the Hevy Music Festival near Folkestone, England. Throughout October and November 2010 Rolo Tomassi supported The Dillinger Escape Plan on their UK tour. On 19 December 2010, the band planned to conclude the year with a free show at the Bloomsbury Ballroom in London, which was to be filmed as part of a documentary and live recording release from the band. However, the show was cancelled due to the ill health of Eva Spence, and so a new UK Tour was announced for May.

With the setting up of their own record label Destination Moon records Rolo Tomassi released Eternal Youth; an anthology of rare and non-album material including acoustic versions, remixes of their own work by various artists and a cover of Throats. This release was accompanied by a short list of tour dates across the UK in May 2011, which were confirmed to be the only tour date Rolo Tomassi would do in 2011. On 8 July 2011, Rolo Tomassi headlined the Red Bull Bedroom Jam Stage at Sonisphere. Rolo Tomassi expressed interest in working with Anthony Gonzalez or Kurt Ballou respectively of M83 and Converge as producers for the third album. In July James Spence said that the third album had not progressed far enough for them to search for producers. He also stated that they, as of July, they had at least two songs created, with a lyrical concept that surfaces as focuses on self-reflection.

=== Astraea (2012–2013) ===
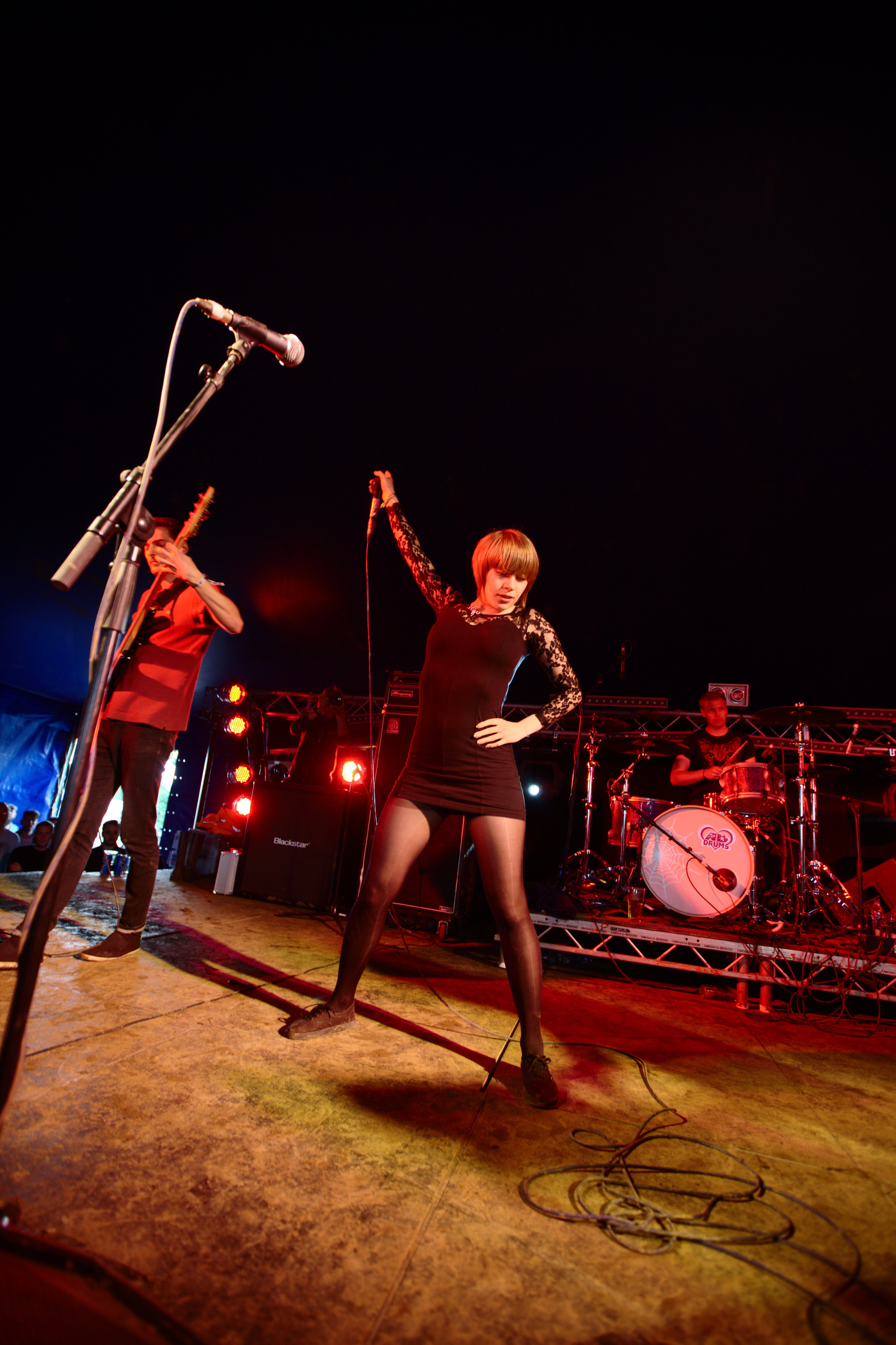
Rolo Tomassi playing 2000 Trees, 2012

In an interview with Kerrang!, Eva Korman confirmed that the band were self-producing their third full-length with Hysterics producer Jason Sanderson. Regarding the sound of the album, she said that it would be "more direct and heavier", but also noted that the band would "never shy away from being experimental". A May release date was initially projected. In early February 2012 Rolo Tomassi announced the release of a new single: "Old Mystics". The single was uploaded to the band's Facebook profile to stream for free. Release of the single was scheduled for 26 March. The band announced a few days after releasing "Old Mystics" for streaming that it would probably not appear on the new album, but just be a stand-alone single. Alongside the announcement of "Old Mystics" the band also announced that they had two brand new members following the departure of Joseph Thorpe and Joe Nicholson. Their replacements were Chris Cayford, current vocalist and former guitarist of No Coast, and Nathan Fairweather who plays in Brontide. Eva Spence said in an interview that Joe Nicholson wanted to pursue taking a chemistry degree at university, while Joe Thorpe's departure was more to do with personal differences.

Rolo Tomassi completed their first tour of the year as the main support for Architects on a 14 date tour. They also stated that they were entering the studio to record their third album in June, with an October release date expected. To support the album's October release Rolo Tomassi projected an 11 date headline tour of the United Kingdom in late October with Oathbreaker and Goodtime Boys. On 16 August 2012, the band announced that their new album would be titled Astraea, with the release date set to be 5 November.

In May 2013 the band did a short British tour with Bastions, the band was noted for only costing five pound a ticket for all venues. On 31 August Rolo Tomassi headlined the first year of Bridgwater based music festival Morbid Mash Up which featured over 20 other bands. In September Rolo Tomassi performed on three out of the four dates of the Japanese touring festival Reverberation Festival. In September and October, starting just three days after their Japanese performances Rolo Tomassi completed a 13 date tour of Australia with Australian bands Totally Unicorn, Safe Hands and Stockades. It marked the first time the band had been in the country since 2010.

=== Grievances and Time Will Die And Love Will Bury It (2014– 2019) ===
Throughout most of 2014 the band was dormant in writing new songs for a fourth album to succeed Astraea. In mid September the band announced a three date tour in the UK with Brontide, their album being released next year and that they are releasing a split EP with Stockades.

The group's fourth full-length album, Grievances, was released on 1 June 2015 through Holy Roar, with an American release through Ipecac. In June 2015 the band's cover for Deftones's Digital Bath was released on Kerrang!'s Ultimate Rock Heroes compilation disc.

In 2017 they had a minimal tour schedule which features appearances at the Two Thousand Trees and Tech Fest festivals in the UK also teased the unveiling of new material with a promotional website lovewillburyit.com. On 5 November the band released the first single from their new album "Rituals" on BBC Radio 1, with a music video accompanying it the next day. On 4 November Rolo Tomassi performed one headline show in London at The Borderline with support from label mates Conjurer. Here they performed two new songs, "Rituals" and "The Hollow Hour". In December Rolo Tomassi performed their first concerts in the United States, supporting The Number Twelve Looks Like You on their Nuclear. Sad. Nuclear. 12 year anniversary tour.

Rolo Tomassi's fifth album Time Will Die And Love Will Bury It was released on 2 March 2018 on Holy Roar Records. It was recorded, like Grievances, at The Ranch in Southampton with Lewis Johns as producer. It was accompanied by a tour through the UK and Europe through March and April. The album was well received by critics, with review aggregator Metacritic giving the album a score of 92/100, making it the second highest rated album of 2018.

The band has performed at a series of European festivals across the summer period, a six date UK tour in November with Blood Command and Cassus, and will be touring the US in November and December again supporting The Number Twelve Looks Like You.

Eva Spence featured on The Number Twelve Looks Like You song "Of Fear" from their 2019 comeback album, Wild Gods, though in the physical album inlay she is listed under the name Eva Korman.

=== Where Myth Becomes Memory (2020–present) ===
On 8 September 2020, the band confirmed that they had ended their relationship with Holy Roar Records in light of allegations of sexual misconduct against the label's owner, Alex Fitzpatrick.

In recording of their new album Where Myth Becomes Memory, the band except for Korman recorded at The Ranch in Southampton; whilst Korman, now living in Bergen County, New Jersey, recorded her vocal tracks at Brady Street Recordings nearby.

On 17 August 2021, Rolo Tomassi released a new single "Cloaked", along with the announcement that the band had signed to MNRK Heavy. This was followed by the release of "Drip" in November 2021, wherein the band also announced their next album would be titled Where Myth Becomes Memory. A third single, "Closer", was released in January 2022. The album was released on 4 February 2022.

== Characteristics ==
=== Musical style ===
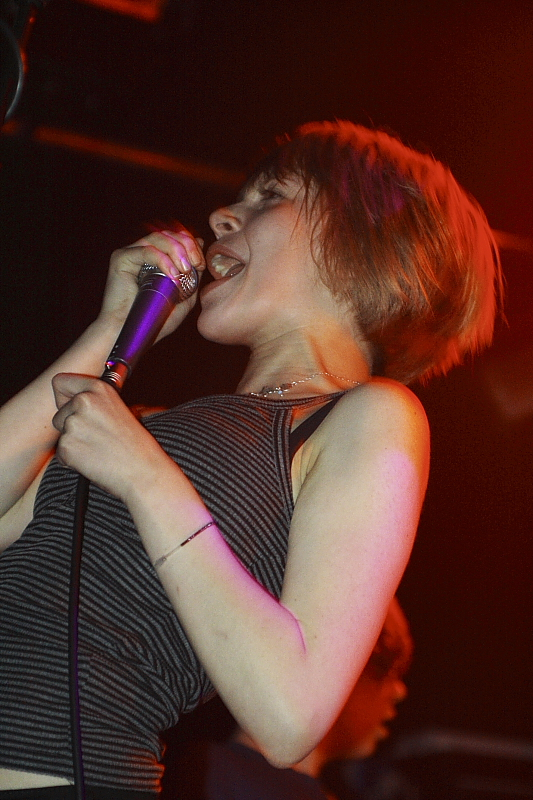
Eva Korman

Their music has been difficult to classify simply because of the band's resistance to being identified with one single genre. Described as "like a polished chrome King Crimson for the 21st Century" they have typically been acknowledged as being mathcore, a tag which summarises the theoretical complexity of their music, such as odd time signatures like 9/8 and 13/8 and polyrhythmic drumming. They have been identified as "falling somewhere between grindcore, progressive and alternative rock" and have been categorised as experimental rock, Nintendocore, post-metal, post-hardcore, progressive hardcore, progressive rock and screamo. The band has been critical of the label Nintendocore being attributed to their work.

The band utilises two vocalists in their music, a quality which "immediately creates a rich and textured sonic world". Eva Spence's vocal style was acknowledged by Michael Wilson of the BBC as bi-polar; swapping between "fragile lullabies to blood-curdling scowls". Her singing voice is in a soprano vocal range and has been compared to the stylings of Alison Goldfrapp of Goldfrapp and Elizabeth Fraser of the Cocteau Twins.

Their earlier work – such as Hysterics, Cosmology and their demos and extended plays – was known for its use of jazz breakdowns and swapping chaotically between explosive mathcore, calm atmospheric experimental music and acid-jazz. Their music is also noted for sharing traits with Nintendocore for the use of 8-bit synthesizers and in terms of chaos and sound. The compilation album Eternal Youth by the band gave insight into their musical development since their inception in 2005 with their demos onto their latest b-side releases with Hassle records.

Their style developed further into their pop, ambient, shoegaze and space rock elements for their third album Astraea and has been jokingly dubbed as cosmic-core. For one of the b-sides from the album – "Mezmerizer" – NME journalist Hamish MacBain classed it as a "space rock ballad". For the album, the band decided to base its name on the goddess of the same name, a reference to the Spence siblings admiration for Greek mythology and a desire to pick a title which made the album "sound big and like this proper body of work". The non-album single "Old Mystics" and the song from the album "The Scales of Balance" both make reference to the "Golden Age" declared by Astraea.

Their next three albums have been seen by the band as belonging to a trilogy. In contrast to the lighter tone developed on Astraea, their fourth album Grievances exhibits a more frenetic and dark composition - utilising pianos and violins for a darker atmospheric effect. Guitarist Chris Crayford described this album "really moody and full of pain". Their fifth album Time Will Die and Love Will Bury It, as described by James Spence, "continues in the vein of Grievances' darkness" and Crayford saw it as "more ethereal" than its predecessor. Where Myth Becomes Memory is described by Crayford as "direct, focused, and considered".

Rolo Tomassi embraced elements of genres that range through screamo, classical, jazz and progressive rock. Blood Brothers, Brian Eno, Cardiacs, jazz saxophonist John Coltrane, Converge, Goldfrapp, the Dillinger Escape Plan, King Crimson, the Locust and the Mars Volta have all been noted by critics as comparisons.

=== Influences ===
Rolo Tomassi have noted how the Dillinger Escape Plan are a huge influence on the band, with Edward Dutton in an interview saying that "they're one of the few stock bands that you can draw from one of the five of us". The fractured structure of their songs are considered to be heavily influenced by The Mars Volta. Ryan Bird of Rock Sound cited At the Drive-In's album Relationship of Command as an influence on Rolo Tomassi's work, saying "opening the mainstream's mind toward fiercely confrontational, independent rock, it was unthought-of that a band like Rolo Tomassi could be successful pre-ROC [sic]." James Spence wrote a guest blog on Clash Music writing about his interest in At The Drive-in, which began with seeing the video for "One Armed Scissor": "I remember being captivated by the way they played and how much the guitarist, Omar, was freaking out. Almost like he was attacking his instrument. It resonated with me somewhat and I was intrigued by it." He commented further on the album's influence, noting "the odd sounds, the samples, the weird, almost undecipherable lyrics." Other early influences they have cited include Meet Me in St. Louis, Converge, La Quiete, M83, the Album Leaf, Das Oathe, Raein, the Locust, Circle Takes the Square, Pretty Girls Make Graves, Meshuggah, the Red Chord, Goblin, Mew, Thursday, A Winged Victory for the Sullen, Ólafur Arnalds, Nils Frahm, Tim Hecker, Jóhann Jóhannsson, indie rock and pop-punk. According to Spence, touring with Gojira and Loathe influenced the heavy parts of their later music.

=== Live performances ===
The band's members have been called "insane hardcore acrobats" for their energetic live performances. When James Spence commented on Rolo Tomassi's live performances, he stated that he felt people who didn't listen to them typically enjoyed their live performances and that "We just want people to enjoy us however they want to." Noisey writer Hannah Ewens notes how lead singer Eva Korman embodies "a soft image in a hard environment" and notes that her movements onstage "while thrashing and aggressive, are balletic and graceful in their anger".

When playing songs from their debut album Hysterics coming closer to their second album's release, they played songs from it faster than originally recorded as their musicianship had improved greatly. Because of the membership change and the wish to play older music at live performances, James Spence used guitar tablature and his own knowledge of the songs written to teach newer members Chris Cayford and Nathan Fairweather. In 2018 drummer Tom Pitts noted how the live shows were more unconventional and "punky" in the tempo of the gigs when he first joined in 2014, however the band in recent years is focused more precision and started playing with a clicker as he drums.

== Band members ==
=== Current members ===
- Eva Korman – lead vocals (2005–present)
- James Spence – backing and lead vocals, keyboards, piano, synthesizers (2005–present)
- Chris Cayford – guitar (2012–present)
- Nathan Fairweather – bass guitar (2012–present)
- Al Pott – drums (2018–present)

=== Former members ===
- Joseph Thorpe – bass guitar (2005–2011)
- Joe Nicholson – guitar (2005–2011)
- Edward Dutton – drums (2005–2013)
- Tom Pitts – drums, backing vocals (2014–2018)

== Discography ==
=== Studio albums ===
- Hysterics (2008)
- Cosmology (2010)
- Astraea (2012)
- Grievances (2015)
- Time Will Die and Love Will Bury It (2018)
- Where Myth Becomes Memory (2022)
